= 2018 SK Brann season =

Brann
2018 season
- President: Eivind Lunde
- Manager: Lars Arne Nilsen
- Stadium: Brann Stadion
- Eliteserien: 3rd
- Norwegian Cup: Fourth Round
- Top goalscorer: League: Steffen Lie Skålevik (9); All: Steffen Lie Skålevik (9)
Home colours	Away colours

The 2018 season is Brann's third season back in Eliteserien since their relegation at the end of the 2014 season.

== Squad ==
Note: Flags indicate national team as defined under FIFA eligibility rules; some limited exceptions apply. Players may hold more than one non-FIFA nationality.

No.	Pos.	Nation	Player
1	GK	AUT	Samuel Şahin-Radlinger (on loan from Hannover 96)
2	DF	EST	Taijo Teniste
3	DF	NED	Vito Wormgoor
4	DF	NOR	Christian Eggen Rismark
5	DF	NOR	Thomas Grøgaard
7	MF	NOR	Peter Orry Larsen
8	MF	NOR	Fredrik Haugen
9	FW	CIV	Daouda Bamba
10	MF	BIH	Amer Ordagić
11	FW	NOR	Steffen Lie Skålevik
12	GK	NOR	Markus Olsen Pettersen
14	FW	NED	Ludcinio Marengo
15	DF	CRC	Bismar Acosta
16	MF	NOR	Ruben Yttergård Jenssen

No.	Pos.	Nation	Player
17	DF	FRO	Gilli Rólantsson
18	FW	NOR	Azar Karadas
19	FW	CRC	Deyver Vega
20	MF	NOR	Halldor Stenevik
21	DF	NOR	Ruben Kristiansen
22	FW	GHA	Gilbert Koomson
25	MF	NOR	Daniel Braaten
27	FW	NOR	Henrik Kjelsrud Johansen
29	MF	NOR	Kristoffer Barmen
34	FW	NOR	Marius Bildøy
35	DF	NOR	Nicholas Marthinussen
38	FW	NOR	Eirik Moldenes
40	FW	NOR	Aune Selland Heggebø

=== Out on loan ===
Note: Flags indicate national team as defined under FIFA eligibility rules; some limited exceptions apply. Players may hold more than one non-FIFA nationality.

No.	Pos.	Nation	Player
—	DF	ISL	Viðar Ari Jónsson (at Fimleikafélag Hafnarfjarðar)
—	MF	NOR	Halldor Stenevik (at Nest-Sotra)

== Transfers ==
=== Winter ===
In: Note: Flags indicate national team as defined under FIFA eligibility rules; some limited exceptions apply. Players may hold more than one non-FIFA nationality.

No.	Pos.	Nation	Player
1	GK	AUT	Samuel Şahin-Radlinger (on loan from (Germany) Hannover 96)
2	DF	EST	Taijo Teniste (from (Norway) Sogndal)
10	MF	BIH	Amer Ordagić (from (Bosnia and Herzegovina) Sloboda Tuzla)
11	FW	NOR	Steffen Lie Skålevik (loan return from (Norway) Start)
20	MF	NOR	Halldor Stenevik (loan return from (Norway) Nest-Sotra)
22	MF	GHA	Gilbert Koomson (from (Norway) Sogndal)
27	FW	NOR	Henrik Kjelsrud Johansen (from (Norway) Vålerenga)
—	DF	NOR	Emil Kalsaas (from (Norway) Fyllingsdalen)

Out: Note: Flags indicate national team as defined under FIFA eligibility rules; some limited exceptions apply. Players may hold more than one non-FIFA nationality.

No.	Pos.	Nation	Player
1	GK	USA	Alex Horwath (to (United States) Real Salt Lake)
6	DF	ISL	Viðar Ari Jónsson (on loan to (Iceland) FH)
9	MF	NOR	Kasper Skaanes (to (Norway) Start)
10	FW	SWE	Jakob Orlov (to (Sweden) Jönköpings Södra)
22	FW	NOR	Torgeir Børven (to (Norway) Odd)
24	GK	POL	Piotr Leciejewski (to (Poland) Zagłębie Lubin)
26	GK	NOR	Lars Cramer (retired)
26	DF	FIN	Dani Hatakka (to (Finland) SJK, previously on loan)
33	DF	NOR	Amin Nouri (to (Norway) Vålerenga)
—	DF	NOR	Viljar Birkeland (to (Norway) Åsane)
—	MF	NOR	Andreas Fantoft (to (Norway) Åsane)

=== Summer ===
In: Note: Flags indicate national team as defined under FIFA eligibility rules; some limited exceptions apply. Players may hold more than one non-FIFA nationality.

No.	Pos.	Nation	Player
4	DF	NOR	Christian Eggen Rismark (from (Norway) Ranheim)
5	DF	NOR	Thomas Grøgaard (from (Norway) Odd)
9	FW	CIV	Daouda Bamba (from (Norway) Kristiansund)
16	MF	NOR	Ruben Yttergård Jenssen (from (Netherlands) Groningen)
20	MF	NOR	Halldor Stenevik (loan return from (Norway) Nest-Sotra)

Out: Note: Flags indicate national team as defined under FIFA eligibility rules; some limited exceptions apply. Players may hold more than one non-FIFA nationality.

No.	Pos.	Nation	Player
5	DF	NOR	Jonas Grønner (to (Norway) Aalesund)
23	MF	NOR	Sivert Heltne Nilsen (to (Denmark) Horsens)
37	DF	NOR	Jonas Tillung Fredriksen (to (Norway) Sogndal)

== Competitions ==
=== Eliteserien ===
==== Results summary ====
Overall								Home						Away					
Pld	W	D	L	GF	GA	GD	Pts	W	D	L	GF	GA	GD	W	D	L	GF	GA	GD
30	17	7	6	45	31	+14	58	9	4	2	24	11	+13	8	3	4	21	20	+1

Last updated: 24 November 2018.
Source: see below

==== Results by round ====
Round	1	2	3	4	5	6	7	8	9	10	11	12	13	14	15	16	17	18	19	20	21	22	23	24	25	26	27	28	29	30
Ground	H	A	H	A	H	A	A	H	A	H	A	H	H	A	A	A	H	A	H	A	H	A	H	A	H	A	H	H	A	H
Result	W	D	W	W	W	W	W	W	W	D	D	W	D	W	L	D	W	L	W	L	W	W	D	L	D	W	L	W	L	W
Position	5	5	4	2	1	1	1	1	1	1	1	1	1	1	1	1	1	1	1	2	2	2	2	2	2	2	3	3	3	3

Updated to match(es) played on 24 November 2018. Source: see below
A = Away; H = Home; W = Win; D = Draw; L = Loss

==== Results ====
10 March 2018 1	Ranheim	–	Brann	Trondheim
18:00 CET (UTC+1)		Report		Stadium: EXTRA Arena
Note: Match postponed due to a frozen pitch.

18 March 2018 2	Brann	2–0	Bodø/Glimt	Bergen
18:00 CET (UTC+1)	Skålevik 18'; Wormgoor 41' (pen.)	Report	Popović (yellow card) 41'; Moberg (yellow card) 84'	Stadium: Brann Stadion; Attendance: 8,447; Referee: Tommy Skjerven

2 April 2018 3	Strømsgodset	1–1	Brann	Drammen
18:00 CEST (UTC+2)	Acosta 76'	Report	Johansen (yellow card) 84'; Barmen 88'	Stadium: Marienlyst Stadion; Attendance: 5,873; Referee: Svein Oddvar Moen

8 April 2018 4	Brann	1–0	Kristiansund	Bergen
18:00 CEST (UTC+2)	Barmen (yellow card) 34'; Nilsen (yellow card) 36'; Acosta 90+8'; Kristiansen (yellow card) 90+9'	Report	Lepistu (yellow card) 29'; McDermott (yellow card) 90+1'	Stadium: Brann Stadion; Attendance: 8,173; Referee: Ola Hobber Nilsen

15 April 2018 5	Sarpsborg 08	1–2	Brann	Sarpsborg
20:00 CEST (UTC+2)	Singh 50'; Halvorsen (yellow card) 79'; Schwartz (penalty missed) 87'; Mortensen (yellow card) 90+1'	Report	Nilsen 12' (yellow card) 64'; Wormgoor 80' (pen.) (yellow card) 87'	Stadium: Sarpsborg Stadion; Attendance: 5,258; Referee: Tom Harald Hagen

21 April 2018 6	Brann	3–0	Stabæk	Bergen
18:00 CEST (UTC+2)	Rólantsson 11'; Wormgoor 44'; Larsen 77'	Report	Vetlesen (yellow card) 52'	Stadium: Brann Stadion; Attendance: 9,478; Referee: Svein Oddvar Moen

25 April 2018 1	Ranheim	0–2	Brann	Trondheim
18:30 CET (UTC+1)	Karlsen (yellow card) 38'; Reginiussen (yellow card) 50'	Report	Skålevik 24', 55'; Barmen (yellow card) 59'	Stadium: EXTRA Arena; Attendance: 2,655; Referee: Trygve Kjensli

29 April 2018 7	Sandefjord	0–1	Brann	Sandefjord
18:00 CEST (UTC+2)	Olsen (yellow card) 69'; Eleftheriou (yellow card) 70'	Report	Nilsen (yellow card) 42'; Larsen 50' (yellow card) 90+2'; Skålevik (yellow card) 68'	Stadium: Komplett Arena; Attendance: 4,672; Referee: Ola Hobber Nilsen

6 May 2018 8	Brann	3–0	Tromsø	Bergen
20:00 CEST (UTC+2)	Wangberg 18' (o.g.); Skålevik 34', 62'; Barmen (yellow card) 61'; Larsen (yellow card) 73'	Report	Berntsen (yellow card) 62'	Stadium: Brann Stadion; Attendance: 9,755; Referee: Rohit Saggi

12 May 2018 9	Start	0–1	Brann	Kristiansand
18:00 CEST (UTC+2)	Robstad (yellow card) 79'	Report	Skålevik 75'	Stadium: Sør Arena; Attendance: 4,859; Referee: Svein Oddvar Moen

16 May 2018 10	Brann	1–1	Haugesund	Bergen
18:00 CEST (UTC+2)	Nilsen (yellow card) 51'; Barmen 70'; Karadas (yellow card) 85'	Report	Haraldseid (yellow card) 32'; Grindheim 54'	Stadium: Brann Stadion; Attendance: 12,914; Referee: Espen Eskås

21 May 2018 11	Lillestrøm	1–1	Brann	Lillestrøm
18:00 CEST (UTC+2)	Mathew 35'; Kippe (yellow card) 89'	Report	Marengo 83'; Karadas (yellow card) 89'	Stadium: Åråsen Stadion; Attendance: 6,078; Referee: Tommy Skjerven

27 May 2018 12	Rosenborg	1–2	Brann	Trondheim
20:00 CEST (UTC+2)	Søderlund 50'	Report	Haugen 55'; Orry Larsen 61'; Skålevik (yellow card) 75'	Stadium: Lerkendal Stadion; Attendance: 19,806; Referee: Svein Oddvar Moen

10 June 2018 13	Brann	0–0	Vålerenga	Bergen
20:00 CEST (UTC+2)	Koomson (yellow card) 90+6'	Report	Ibrahim (yellow card) 79'	Stadium: Brann Stadion; Attendance: 12,004; Referee: Dag Vidar Hafsås

25 June 2018 14	Odd	0–1	Brann	Skien
19:00 CEST (UTC+2)	Samuelsen (yellow card) 54'; Kaasa (yellow card) 59'; Broberg (yellow card) 79'	Report	Larsen (yellow card) 43'; Acosta 63'	Stadium: Skagerak Arena; Attendance: 6,761; Referee: Ola Hobber Nilsen

1 July 2018 15	Brann	0–4	Molde	Bergen
18:00 CEST (UTC+2)	Wormgoor (yellow card) 20'	Report	Haaland 4', 13', 15', 21' (pen.); Aursnes (yellow card) 45+1'; Gregersen (yellow card) 90'	Stadium: Brann Stadion; Attendance: 11,371; Referee: Trond Ivar Døvle

8 July 2018 16	Bodø/Glimt	2–2	Brann	Bodø
18:00 CEST (UTC+2)	Opseth 23', 66'; Jurado (yellow card) 78'	Report	Nilsen 8'; Acosta (yellow card) 51'; Larsen 60'; Skålevik (yellow card) 76'	Stadium: Aspmyra Stadion; Attendance: 3,082; Referee: Espen Eskås

6 August 2018 17	Brann	4–1	Start	Bergen
19:00 CEST (UTC+2)	Haugen 3'; Ordagić 31'; Koomson 85'; Marengo 90'	Report	Kabran 59'; Segberg (yellow card) 63'; Robstad (yellow card) 83'	Stadium: Brann Stadion; Attendance: 9,865; Referee: Trygve Kjensli

12 August 2018 18	Molde	5–1	Brann	Molde
18:00 CEST (UTC+2)	Haaland 3' (pen.); Cibicki 20' (yellow card) 47'; Aursnes 25', 69'; Forren (yellow card) 50'; Haugen 78'	Report	Şahin-Radlinger (yellow card) 2'; Skålevik 45+2'; Haugen (yellow card) 51'	Stadium: Aker Stadion; Attendance: 7,640; Referee: Ola Hobber Nilsen

19 August 2018 19	Brann	2–0	Sarpsborg 08	Bergen
18:00 CEST (UTC+2)	Wormgoor 5'; Skålevik 49'	Report		Stadium: Brann Stadion; Attendance: 11,103; Referee: Tommy Skjerven

26 August 2018 20	Vålerenga	2–0	Brann	Oslo
20:00 CEST (UTC+2)	Nouri 56'; Adekugbe (yellow card) 90+2'; Myhre 90+5'	Report	Haugen (yellow card) 3'; Bamba (yellow card) 70'	Stadium: Intility Arena; Attendance: 11,759; Referee: Rohit Saggi

2 September 2018 21	Brann	1–0	Ranheim	Bergen
18:00 CEST (UTC+2)	Larsen 59'; Haugen (yellow card) 72'	Report		Stadium: Brann Stadion; Attendance: 9,764; Referee: Tore Hansen

15 September 2018 22	Haugesund	1–3	Brann	Haugesund
18:00 CEST (UTC+2)	Knudsen (yellow card) 36'; Velde 80'; Tronstad (yellow card) 87'	Report	Bamba 9'; Rólantsson 12'; Barmen 62'	Stadium: Haugesund Stadion; Attendance: 7,523; Referee: Rohit Saggi

23 September 2018 23	Brann	1–1	Sandefjord	Bergen
18:00 CEST (UTC+2)	Skålevik 86'	Report	Storbæk 80'; Høibråten (yellow card) 85'; Pálsson (yellow card) 90+1'; Rufo (yellow card) 90+4'	Stadium: Brann Stadion; Attendance: 10,832; Referee: Tom Harald Hagen

1 October 2018 24	Tromsø	2–1	Brann	Tromsø
19:00 CEST (UTC+2)	Antonsen 2'; Nilsen (yellow card) 49'; Valakari (yellow card) 59'; Ingebrigtsen 73'	Report	Haugen 3'; Acosta (yellow card) 71'	Stadium: Alfheim Stadion; Attendance: 3,538; Referee: Trygve Kjensli

7 October 2018 25	Brann	1–1	Lillestrøm	Bergen
20:00 CEST (UTC+2)	Teniste 64'	Report	Ødemarksbakken 78'	Stadium: Brann Stadion; Attendance: 9,282; Referee: Ola Hobber Nilsen

21 October 2018 26	Stabæk	1–2	Brann	Bærum
20:00 CEST (UTC+2)	Bohinen (yellow card) 27'; Boli (yellow card) 43' (goal) 48'	Report	Haugen (yellow card) 13'; Johansen 52'; Bamba 77'; Jenssen (yellow card) 90+5'	Stadium: Nadderud Stadion; Attendance: 4,031; Referee: Trond Ivar Døvle

28 October 2018 27	Brann	1–2	Rosenborg	Bergen
20:00 CET (UTC+1)	Vega 48'	Report	Adegbenro 14'; Jensen 16'; André Hansen (yellow card) 90+4'	Stadium: Brann Stadion; Attendance: 12,914; Referee: Svein Oddvar Moen

4 November 2018 28	Brann	3–1	Strømsgodset	Bergen
20:00 CET (UTC+1)	Haugen 2'; Rismark 56'; Rólantsson 59'; Koomson (yellow card) 90+3'	Report	Nguen (yellow card) 74'; Abdellaoue 89'	Stadium: Brann Stadion; Attendance: 8,887; Referee: Tore Hansen

11 November 2018 29	Kristiansund	3–1	Brann	Kristiansund
18:00 CET (UTC+1)	Hopmark 40'; Diop 55'; D.Ulvestad (yellow card) 74' (goal) 89'; Sørmo (yellow card) 75'	Report	Rólantsson (yellow card) 29'; Haugen (yellow card) 38'; Barmen (yellow card) 43'; Bamba 59'	Stadium: Kristiansund Stadion; Attendance: 4,215; Referee: Rhoit Saggi

24 November 2018 30	Brann	1–0	Odd	Bergen
18:00 CET (UTC+1)	Bamba 3'	Report	Ruud (yellow card) 90+1'	Stadium: Brann Stadion; Attendance: 11,677; Referee: Trond Ivar Døvle

==== Table ====
Pos	Team	Pld	W	D	L	GF	GA	GD	Pts	Qualification or relegation
1	Rosenborg (C)	30	19	7	4	51	24	+27	64	Qualification for the Champions League first qualifying round (Note: Since the winners of the 2018 Norwegian Cup (Rosenborg) qualified for European competition based on league position, the spot awarded to the cup winners (Europa League first qualifying round) was passed to the second-placed team, while the spot awarded to the second-placed team (Europa League first qualifying round) was passed to the fourth-placed team.)
2	Molde	30	18	5	7	63	36	+27	59	Qualification for the Europa League first qualifying round
3	Brann	30	17	7	6	45	31	+14	58	Qualification for the Europa League first qualifying round
4	Haugesund	30	16	5	9	45	33	+12	53	Qualification for the Europa League first qualifying round
5	Kristiansund	30	13	7	10	46	41	+5	46	

Source: Football Association of Norway (in Norwegian), Soccerway
Rules for classification: 1) Points; 2) Goal difference; 3) Goals scored; 4) Head-to-head points; 5) Head-to-head goal difference; 6) Head-to-head away goals scored (only if between two teams); 7) Head-to-head goals scored; 8) Play-off (only used to decide champions or relegation).
(C) Champions

=== Norwegian Cup ===
18 April 2018 First Round	Sandviken	1–6	Brann	Bergen
18:15 CEST (UTC+2)	Grøttå 59'	Report	Vega 7', 60'; Grønner (yellow card) 15'; Johansen 25', 44'; Braaten 32'; Heggebø 65'	Stadium: Stemmemyren Kunstgress; Attendance: 1,100; Referee: Sivert Amland

2 May 2018 Second Round	Sotra	0–4	Brann	Sotra
18:00 CEST (UTC+2)	Ø.Nilsen (yellow card) 88'	Report	Grønner 20'; Vega 25' (pen.); Larsen 41'; Marengo 75'; Marthinussen (red card) 79'	Stadium: Straume Sports Park; Attendance: 1,113; Referee: Marius Hansen Grøtta

9 May 2018 Third Round	Fyllingsdalen	0–1	Brann	Bergen
18:00 CEST (UTC+2)	K.Valsvik (yellow card) 16'; E.Kampenes (yellow card) 67'; T.Økland (yellow card) 73'	Report	Vega 49' (yellow card) 90+2'	Stadium: Varden Amfi; Attendance: 3,500; Referee: Kai Erik Steen

30 May 2018 Fourth Round	Lillestrøm	4–1	Brann	Lillestrøm
20:00 CEST (UTC+2)	Mathew 51'; Martin 68'; Olsen 75'; Haakenstad 90'	Report	Karadas 52'	Stadium: Åråsen Stadion; Attendance: 4,456; Referee: Tom Harald Hagen

== Squad statistics ==
As of match played 24 November 2018

=== Appearances and goals ===
No.	Pos	Nat	Player	Total		Eliteserien		Norwegian Cup	
No.	Pos	Nat	Player	Apps	Goals	Apps	Goals	Apps	Goals
1	GK	(Austria) AUT	Samuel Şahin-Radlinger	23	0	22	0	1	0
2	DF	(Estonia) EST	Taijo Teniste	23	1	23	1	0	0
3	DF	(Netherlands) NED	Vito Wormgoor	29	4	29	4	0	0
4	DF	(Norway) NOR	Christian Eggen Rismark	6	1	6	1	0	0
5	DF	(Norway) NOR	Thomas Grøgaard	12	0	12	0	0	0
7	MF	(Norway) NOR	Peter Orry Larsen	24	6	10+12	5	2	1
8	MF	(Norway) NOR	Fredrik Haugen	28	4	27	4	1	0
9	FW	(Ivory Coast) CIV	Daouda Bamba	11	4	7+4	4	0	0
10	MF	(Bosnia and Herzegovina) BIH	Amer Ordagić	11	1	5+3	1	3	0
11	FW	(Norway) NOR	Steffen Lie Skålevik	29	9	23+5	9	0+1	0
12	GK	(Norway) NOR	Markus Olsen Pettersen	10	0	8	0	2	0
14	MF	(Netherlands) NED	Ludcinio Marengo	19	3	12+4	2	1+2	1
15	DF	(Costa Rica) CRC	Bismar Acosta	28	2	25+2	2	1	0
16	MF	(Norway) NOR	Ruben Yttergård Jenssen	12	0	10+2	0	0	0
17	DF	(Faroe Islands) FRO	Gilli Rólantsson	30	3	27+1	3	2	0
18	FW	(Norway) NOR	Azar Karadas	18	1	0+15	0	3	1
19	FW	(Costa Rica) CRC	Deyver Vega	15	4	0+12	1	3	3
21	DF	(Norway) NOR	Ruben Kristiansen	13	0	12+1	0	0	0
22	FW	(Ghana) GHA	Gilbert Koomson	32	1	30	1	1+1	0
23	MF	(Norway) NOR	Sivert Heltne Nilsen	17	2	15	2	2	0
25	MF	(Norway) NOR	Daniel Braaten	14	1	3+8	0	2+1	1
27	FW	(Norway) NOR	Henrik Kjelsrud Johansen	21	3	1+17	1	3	2
29	MF	(Norway) NOR	Kristoffer Barmen	23	3	23	3	0	0
34	FW	(Norway) NOR	Marius Bildøy	1	0	0+1	0	0	0
35	DF	(Norway) NOR	Nicholas Marthinussen	2	0	0	0	2	0
38	FW	(Norway) NOR	Eirik Moldenes	1	0	0	0	0+1	0
40	FW	(Norway) NOR	Aune Selland Heggebø	1	1	0	0	0+1	1
	MF	(Norway) NOR	Andreas Mjøs	1	0	0	0	0+1	0
Players away from Brann on loan:
Players who left Brann during the season:
5	DF	(Norway) NOR	Jonas Grønner	3	1	0	0	3	1
9	MF	(Norway) NOR	Kasper Skaanes	2	0	0+2	0	0	0
37	DF	(Norway) NOR	Jonas Tillung Fredriksen	2	0	0	0	1+1	0

=== Goal scorers ===
Place	Position	Nation	Number	Name	Eliteserien	Norwegian Cup	Total
1	FW	(Norway)	11	Steffen Lie Skålevik	9	0	9
2	MF	(Norway)	7	Peter Orry Larsen	5	1	6
3	DF	(Netherlands)	3	Vito Wormgoor	4	0	4
3	MF	(Norway)	8	Fredrik Haugen	4	0	4
3	FW	(Ivory Coast)	9	Daouda Bamba	4	0	4
3	FW	(Costa Rica)	19	Deyver Vega	1	3	4
7	MF	(Norway)	29	Kristoffer Barmen	3	0	3
7	DF	(Faroe Islands)	17	Gilli Rólantsson	3	0	3
7	MF	(Netherlands)	14	Ludcinio Marengo	2	1	3
7	FW	(Norway)	27	Henrik Kjelsrud Johansen	1	2	3
11	DF	(Costa Rica)	15	Bismar Acosta	2	0	2
11	MF	(Norway)	23	Sivert Heltne Nilsen	2	0	2
12	MF	(Bosnia and Herzegovina)	10	Amer Ordagić	1	0	1
12	FW	(Ghana)	22	Gilbert Koomson	1	0	1
12	DF	(Estonia)	2	Taijo Teniste	1	0	1
12	DF	(Norway)	4	Christian Eggen Rismark	1	0	1
12	MF	(Norway)	25	Daniel Braaten	0	1	1
12	FW	(Norway)	40	Aune Selland Heggebø	0	1	1
12	DF	(Norway)	5	Jonas Grønner	0	1	1
12	FW	(Norway)	18	Azar Karadas	0	1	1
12				Own goal	1	0	1
				TOTALS	45	11	56

=== Disciplinary record ===
Number	Nation	Position	Name	Eliteserien		Norwegian Cup		Total	
Number	Nation	Position	Name	Booked	Sent off (straight red)	Booked	Sent off (straight red)	Booked	Sent off (straight red)
1	(Austria)	GK	Samuel Şahin-Radlinger	1	0	0	0	1	0
3	(Netherlands)	DF	Vito Wormgoor	2	0	0	0	2	0
7	(Norway)	MF	Peter Orry Larsen	3	0	0	0	3	0
8	(Norway)	MF	Fredrik Haugen	5	0	0	0	5	0
9	(Ivory Coast)	FW	Daouda Bamba	1	0	0	0	1	0
11	(Norway)	FW	Steffen Lie Skålevik	3	0	0	0	3	0
15	(Costa Rica)	DF	Bismar Acosta	2	0	0	0	2	0
16	(Norway)	MF	Ruben Yttergård Jenssen	1	0	0	0	1	0
17	(Faroe Islands)	DF	Gilli Rólantsson	1	0	0	0	1	0
18	(Norway)	FW	Azar Karadas	2	0	0	0	2	0
21	(Norway)	DF	Ruben Kristiansen	1	0	0	0	1	0
22	(Ghana)	FW	Gilbert Koomson	2	0	0	0	2	0
23	(Norway)	MF	Sivert Heltne Nilsen	4	0	0	0	4	0
27	(Norway)	FW	Henrik Kjelsrud Johansen	1	0	0	0	1	0
29	(Norway)	MF	Kristoffer Barmen	4	0	0	0	4	0
35	(Norway)	DF	Nicholas Marthinussen	0	1	0	0	0	1
Players who left Brann during the season:
5	(Norway)	DF	Jonas Grønner	0	0	1	0	1	0
			TOTALS	33	0	1	1	34	1
