= 2017 SK Brann season =

Brann
2016 season
- President: Eivind Lunde
- Manager: Lars Arne Nilsen
- Stadium: Brann Stadion
- Eliteserien: 5th
- Norwegian Cup: Fourth Round vs Mjøndalen
- UEFA Europa League: Second qualifying round vs Ružomberok
- Mesterfinalen: Runners-up
- Top goalscorer: League: Kristoffer Barmen (8); All: Kristoffer Barmen (8)
Home colours	Away colours

The 2017 season is Brann's second season back in Eliteserien since their relegation at the end of the 2014 season.

== Squad ==
As of 6 September 2017

Note: Flags indicate national team as defined under FIFA eligibility rules; some limited exceptions apply. Players may hold more than one non-FIFA nationality.

No.	Pos.	Nation	Player
1	GK	USA	Alex Horwath
3	DF	NED	Vito Wormgoor
5	DF	NOR	Jonas Grønner
6	DF	ISL	Viðar Ari Jónsson
7	MF	NOR	Peter Orry Larsen
8	MF	NOR	Fredrik Haugen
9	MF	NOR	Kasper Skaanes
10	FW	SWE	Jakob Orlov
11	FW	NOR	Steffen Lie Skålevik
12	GK	NOR	Markus Olsen Pettersen
14	MF	NED	Ludcinio Marengo
15	DF	CRC	Bismar Acosta

No.	Pos.	Nation	Player
17	DF	FRO	Gilli Rólantsson
18	FW	NOR	Azar Karadas
19	FW	CRC	Deyver Vega
20	MF	NOR	Halldor Stenevik
21	DF	NOR	Ruben Kristiansen
22	FW	NOR	Torgeir Børven
23	MF	NOR	Sivert Heltne Nilsen
24	GK	POL	Piotr Leciejewski
25	MF	NOR	Daniel Braaten
26	GK	NOR	Lars Cramer
29	MF	NOR	Kristoffer Barmen
33	DF	NOR	Amin Nouri

=== Out on loan ===
Note: Flags indicate national team as defined under FIFA eligibility rules; some limited exceptions apply. Players may hold more than one non-FIFA nationality.

No.	Pos.	Nation	Player
26	DF	FIN	Dani Hatakka (at SJK)

== Transfers ==
=== Winter ===
In: Note: Flags indicate national team as defined under FIFA eligibility rules; some limited exceptions apply. Players may hold more than one non-FIFA nationality.

No.	Pos.	Nation	Player
3	DF	NED	Vito Wormgoor (from (Norway) Aalesund)
6	DF	ISL	Viðar Ari Jónsson (from (Iceland) Fjölnir)
7	MF	NOR	Peter Orry Larsen (from (Norway) Aalesund)
22	FW	NOR	Torgeir Børven (from (Netherlands) Twente)

Out: Note: Flags indicate national team as defined under FIFA eligibility rules; some limited exceptions apply. Players may hold more than one non-FIFA nationality.

No.	Pos.	Nation	Player
6	DF	NOR	Vadim Demidov (to (United States) Minnesota United)
14	MF	NOR	Fredrik Heggland (to (Norway) Åsane, previously on loan at (Norway) Fana)
16	MF	NOR	Remi Johansen (to (Norway) Sandnes Ulf)
23	FW	NOR	Erik Huseklepp (to (Norway) Haugesund)
26	DF	FIN	Dani Hatakka (on loan to (Finland) SJK, previously on loan at (Norway) Hødd)
39	FW	NOR	Oliver Rotihaug (to (Norway) Florø, previously on loan)
—	DF	NOR	Fredrik Pallesen Knudsen (to (Norway) Haugesund, previously on loan at (Norway) Åsane)

=== Summer ===
In: Note: Flags indicate national team as defined under FIFA eligibility rules; some limited exceptions apply. Players may hold more than one non-FIFA nationality.

No.	Pos.	Nation	Player
14	MF	NED	Ludcinio Marengo (from (Netherlands) ADO Den Haag)
26	GK	NOR	Lars Cramer

Out: Note: Flags indicate national team as defined under FIFA eligibility rules; some limited exceptions apply. Players may hold more than one non-FIFA nationality.

No.	Pos.	Nation	Player
11	FW	NOR	Steffen Lie Skålevik (on loan to (Norway) Start)
20	MF	NOR	Halldor Stenevik (on loan to (Norway) Nest-Sotra)

== Competitions ==
=== Mesterfinalen ===
29 March 2017	Brann	0–2	Rosenborg	Bergen
19:00 CEST (UTC+2)	Vega (yellow card) 43'; Acosta (yellow card) 88'	Summary	Jevtović 32'; Rasmussen (yellow card) 43'; Jensen (yellow card) 48'; Bakenga (yellow card) 84'; Reginiussen 90+4'	Stadium: Brann Stadion; Attendance: 10,681; Referee: Svein Oddvar Moen

=== Eliteserien ===
==== Results summary ====
Overall								Home						Away					
Pld	W	D	L	GF	GA	GD	Pts	W	D	L	GF	GA	GD	W	D	L	GF	GA	GD
30	13	8	9	51	36	+15	47	8	4	3	30	15	+15	5	4	6	21	21	0

Last updated: 26 November 2017.
Source: see below

==== Results by round ====
Round	1	2	3	4	5	6	7	8	9	10	11	12	13	14	15	16	17	18	19	20	21	22	23	24	25	26	27	28	29	30
Ground	A	H	A	H	A	H	A	H	H	A	H	A	H	A	H	A	H	A	H	A	H	A	A	H	A	H	A	H	A	H
Result	D	W	L	W	W	D	L	W	W	W	D	D	W	D	D	L	L	D	W	W	W	W	L	L	L	L	W	W	L	D
Position	8	4	7	5	4	4	5	3	3	2	2	3	1	2	2	2	4	4	3	3	3	2	3	4	4	5	5	5	5	5

Updated to match(es) played on 26 November 2017. Source: see below
A = Away; H = Home; W = Win; D = Draw; L = Loss

==== Results ====
2 April 2017 1	Tromsø	1–1	Brann	Tromsø
18:00 CEST (UTC+2)	Pedersen (yellow card) 52'; Ødegaard (yellow card) 83'; Ødegaard 90'	Report	Orlov 46'; Grønner (yellow card) 49'; Acosta (yellow card) 90+3'	Stadium: Alfheim Stadion; Attendance: 3,264; Referee: Trond Ivar Døvle

6 April 2017 2	Brann	3–0	Strømsgodset	Bergen
19:00 CEST (UTC+2)	Barmen 9'; Wormgoor (yellow card) 19'; Vega (yellow card) 28'; Vilsvik 72' (o.g.); Orlov 77'	Report		Stadium: Brann Stadion; Attendance: 8,706; Referee: Tom Harald Hagen

10 April 2017 3	Kristiansund	1–0	Brann	Kristiansund
19:00 CEST (UTC+2)	Coly (yellow card) 60'; Økland 72' (pen.)	Report	Nilsen (yellow card) 61'; Wormgoor (yellow card) 88'; Karadas (yellow card) 90+2'	Stadium: Atlanten Stadion; Attendance: 3,905; Referee: Svein Odvar Moen

17 April 2017 4	Brann	3–1	Haugesund	Bergen
18:00 CEST (UTC+2)	Børven 17', 77'; Nilsen 29'; Acosta (yellow card) 84'	Report	Abdi 61'; Kiss (yellow card) 70'	Stadium: Brann Stadion; Attendance: 11,348; Referee: Espen Eskås

23 April 2017 5	Lillestrøm	0–2	Brann	Lillestrøm
20:00 CEST (UTC+2)		Report	Nilsen (yellow card) 34'; Braaten (yellow card) 40' (goal) 53'; Rólantsson 60'	Stadium: Åråsen Stadion; Attendance: 5,777; Referee: Tom Harald Hagen

29 April 2017 6	Brann	1–1	Viking	Bergen
18:00 CEST (UTC+2)	Haugen 22'; Nilsen (yellow card) 67'; Barmen (yellow card) 77'	Report	Adegbenro (yellow card) 64' (goal) 90+3'; Ryerson (yellow card) 67'	Stadium: Brann Stadion; Attendance: 12,613; Referee: Ola Hobber Nilsen

7 May 2017 7	Rosenborg	2–1	Brann	Trondheim
20:00 CEST (UTC+2)	Helland 8'; Bendtner (yellow card) 53'; Konradsen 90'	Report	Rólantsson 79'; Braaten (yellow card) 90'	Stadium: Lerkendal Stadion; Attendance: 17,020; Referee: Espen Eskås

13 May 2017 8	Brann	4–1	Molde	Bergen
20:00 CEST (UTC+2)	Kristiansen 39'; Barmen (yellow card) 49'; Grønner 58'; Orlov 85'; Braaten 87'	Report	Brustad 43'	Stadium: Brann Stadion; Attendance: 10,227; Referee: Tore Hansen

16 May 2017 9	Brann	5–0	Sandefjord	Bergen
18:00 CEST (UTC+2)	Barmen 5'; Haugen 14'; Orlov 40'; Rólantsson 41'; Jónsson 90+2'	Report	Kane (yellow card) 82'	Stadium: Brann Stadion; Attendance: 17,009; Referee: Martin Lundby

20 May 2017 10	Sogndal	2–3	Brann	Sogndalsfjøra
18:00 CEST (UTC+2)	Schulze 10' (yellow card) 80'; Steiring 61'; Ramsland (yellow card) 77'	Report	Barmen 63'; Larsen 82'; Haugen 84'; Leciejewski (yellow card) 88'	Stadium: Fosshaugane Campus; Attendance: 5,600; Referee: Espen Eskås

28 May 2017 11	Brann	1–1	Aalesunds	Bergen
18:00 CEST (UTC+2)	Ramsteijn 34' (o.g.); Nilsen (yellow card) 40' (yellow-red card) 83'; Braaten (yellow card) 52'	Report	A.Lie (yellow card) 40'; Gyasi 81'	Stadium: Brann Stadion; Attendance: 12,019; Referee: Ola Hobber Nilsen

4 June 2017 12	Odd	0–0	Brann	Skien
20:00 CEST (UTC+2)	Zekhnini (yellow card) 59'	Report		Stadium: Skagerak Arena; Attendance: 7,828; Referee: Tore Hansen

19 June 2017 13	Brann	5–0	Stabæk	Bergen
19:00 CEST (UTC+2)	Braaten 20'; Nouri 39'; Acosta 41'; Ba 64' (o.g.); Vega 87'	Report	Moe (yellow card) 48'	Stadium: Brann Stadion; Attendance: 10,531; Referee: Svein Odvar Moen

25 June 2017 14	Sarpsborg 08	1–1	Brann	Sarpsborg
18:00 CEST (UTC+2)	Zachariassen 22'	Report	Haugen (yellow card) 35'; Vega (yellow card) 67'; Wormgoor 73'; Nouri (yellow card) 85'	Stadium: Sarpsborg Stadion; Attendance: 5,759; Referee: Tommy Skjerven

2 July 2017 15	Brann	0–0	Vålerenga	Bergen
20:00 CEST (UTC+2)	Nilsen (yellow card) 23'	Report	Zahid (yellow card) 89'	Stadium: Brann Stadion; Attendance: 16,136; Referee: Tom Harald Hagen

9 July 2017 16	Stabæk	2–0	Brann	Bærum
20:00 CEST (UTC+2)	Hanche-Olsen 2'; Omoijuanfo 60'	Report		Stadium: Nadderud Stadion; Attendance: 4,205; Referee: Tore Hansen

16 July 2017 17	Brann	0–1	Sarpsborg 08	Bergen
20:00 CEST (UTC+2)	Børven (yellow card) 31'; Acosta (yellow card) 39'	Report	Albech (yellow card) 20' (yellow-red card) 88'; Trondsen (yellow card) 62'; Mortensen 90+3'	Stadium: Brann Stadion; Attendance: 10,721; Referee: Trond Ivar Døvle

6 August 2017 18	Aalesunds	3–3	Brann	Ålesund
20:00 CEST (UTC+2)	Hoff (yellow card) 18'; Papazoglou 36' (pen.); Kirkeskov (yellow card) 62'; Ramsteijn (yellow card) 71'; Abdellaoue 82' (pen.), 90+2'	Report	Orlov 10'; Barmen 12', 69'; Grønner (yellow card) 53'; Karadas (yellow card) 90+4'	Stadium: Color Line Stadion; Attendance: 5,736; Referee: Trygve Kjensli

13 August 2017 19	Brann	2–0	Odd	Bergen
18:00 CEST (UTC+2)	Rólantsson 30'; Acosta (yellow card) 53'; Barmen 58' (yellow card) 78'	Report		Stadium: Brann Stadion; Attendance: 10,019; Referee: Svein Odvar Moen

20 August 2017 20	Viking	2–4	Brann	Stavanger
20:00 CEST (UTC+2)	Danielsen (yellow card) 18'; Høiland 39' (pen.); Ryerson 61'; Cruz (yellow card) 90'	Report	Vega 28'; Skaanes 63'; Haugen 69'; Larsen 90'	Stadium: Viking Stadion; Attendance: 9,838; Referee: Tore Hansen

9 September 2017 21	Brann	2–1	Sogndal	Bergen
18:00 CEST (UTC+2)	Vega 9'; Barmen 50'	Report	Schulze 24'; Ramsland (yellow card) 72'; Grodås (yellow card) 83'	Stadium: Brann Stadion; Attendance: 15,374; Referee: Ola Hobber Nilsen

17 September 2017 22	Sandefjord	0–1	Brann	Sandefjord
18:00 CEST (UTC+2)	Hansen (yellow card) 68'; Grossmüller (yellow card) 71'	Report	Vega 27'	Stadium: Komplett Arena; Attendance: 5,502; Referee: Ola Hobber Nilsen

24 September 2017 23	Vålerenga	2–1	Brann	Oslo
20:00 CEST (UTC+2)	Friðjónsson 8' (yellow card) 90'; Ejuke 83'	Report	Barmen (yellow card) 47'; Haugen 52'	Stadium: Valle Hovin; Attendance: 10,051; Referee: Dag Vidar Hafsås

29 September 2017 24	Brann	0–4	Kristiansund	Bergen
19:00 CEST (UTC+2)		Report	Stokke 44', 66'; Hopmark (yellow card) 27'; Baranov (yellow card) 41'; Gjertsen 44', 70'	Stadium: Brann Stadion; Attendance: 10,025; Referee: Martin Lundby

15 October 2017 25	Molde	1–0	Brann	Molde
20:00 CEST (UTC+2)	Forren (yellow card) 52'; Gregersen (yellow card) 68'; Gabrielsen 90+5'	Report	Barmen (yellow card) 35'; Acosta (yellow card) 87'; Braaten (yellow card) 88'	Stadium: Aker Stadion; Attendance: 6,861; Referee: Ola Hobber Nilsen

22 October 2017 26	Brann	0–3	Rosenborg	Bergen
20:00 CEST (UTC+2)	Skaanes (yellow card) 33'; Kristiansen (yellow card) 56'	Report	Adegbenro (yellow card) 38'; Bendtner 55', 59'; Gersbach (yellow card) 64'; Trondsen (yellow card) 86'; Jevtović 90'	Stadium: Brann Stadion; Attendance: 13,619; Referee: Tom Harald Hagen

28 October 2017 27	Haugesund	2–3	Brann	Haugesund
18:00 CEST (UTC+2)	Andreassen 17'; Ikedi 44'; Ćosić (yellow card) 60'; Haraldseid (yellow card) 88'; Serafin (yellow card) 90+4'	Report	Barmen 23'; Wormgoor 60' (pen.); Marengo (yellow card) 62'; Børven 82'; Haugen (yellow card) 90+5'	Stadium: Haugesund Stadion; Attendance: 6,100; Referee: Espen Eskås

5 November 2017 28	Brann	2–0	Lillestrøm	Bergen
18:00 CET (UTC+1)	Vega 8'; Nilsen (yellow card) 44'; Larsen (yellow card) 66'; Grønner 82'; Leciejewski (yellow card) 90'	Report	Kippe (yellow card) 77'	Stadium: Brann Stadion; Attendance: 9,594; Referee: Rohit Saggi

19 November 2017 29	Strømsgodset	2–1	Brann	Drammen
18:00 CEST (UTC+2)	Pedersen 4' (yellow card) 84'; Andersen 78'	Report	Wormgoor (yellow card) 41'; Vega (yellow card) 45' (goal) 81'	Stadium: Marienlyst Stadion; Attendance: 7,706; Referee: Dag Vidar Hafsås

26 November 2017 30	Brann	2–2	Tromsø	Bergen
18:00 CEST (UTC+2)	Marengo 2'; Larsen 56'; Grønner (yellow card) 80'	Report	Antonsen 45'; Olsen 76'; Jenssen (yellow card) 90+2'	Stadium: Brann Stadion; Attendance: 9,941; Referee: Svein Oddvar Moen

==== Table ====
Pos	Team	Pld	W	D	L	GF	GA	GD	Pts	Qualification or relegation
3	Sarpsborg 08	30	13	12	5	50	36	+14	51	Qualification for the Europa League first qualifying round
4	Strømsgodset	30	14	8	8	45	37	+8	50	
5	Brann	30	13	8	9	51	36	+15	47	
6	Odd	30	12	6	12	27	39	−12	42	
7	Kristiansund	30	10	10	10	44	46	−2	40	

Source: Football Association of Norway (in Norwegian), Soccerway
Rules for classification: 1) Points; 2) Goal difference; 3) Goals scored; 4) Head-to-head points; 5) Head-to-head goal difference; 6) Head-to-head away goals scored (only if between two teams); 7) Head-to-head goals scored; 8) Play-off (only used to decide champions or relegation).

=== Norwegian Cup ===
26 April 2017 First Round	Austevoll	0–7	Brann	Storebø
18:00 CEST (UTC+2)		Report	Skålevik 25', 85'; Karadas 33'; Grønner 44'; Jónsson (yellow card) 75'; Stenevik 76'; Bildøy 85' (pen.); Vega 86'	Stadium: Austevoll Kunstgress; Attendance: 1,200; Referee: Jan Morten Tennøy

24 May 2017 Second Round	Lysekloster	0–2	Brann	Lyse Abbey
18:00 CEST (UTC+2)	J.Helland (yellow card) 50'	Report	Jónsson (yellow card) 20'; Børven 25'; Haugen (yellow card) 50'; Nilsen 52'	Stadium: Lysekloster Framo Idrettspark; Attendance: 1,495; Referee: Sivert Amland

31 May 2017 Third Round	Nest-Sotra	0–2	Brann	Ågotnes
18:30 CEST (UTC+2)		Report	Orlov 66', 71'	Stadium: Ågotnes Stadion; Attendance: 1,515; Referee: Trond Ivar Døvle

9 August 2017 Fourth Round	Mjøndalen	1–0	Brann	Mjøndalen
19:45 CEST (UTC+2)	Gauseth 35'; Olsen (yellow card) 89'	Report		Stadium: Isachsen Stadion; Attendance: 2,499; Referee: Ola Hobber Nilsen

=== UEFA Europa League ===
==== Qualifying rounds ====
13 July 2017 Second qualifying round 1st leg	Ružomberok (Slovakia)	0–1	(Norway) Brann	Ružomberok, Slovakia
18:00 CEST (UTC+2)	Gál-Andrezly (yellow card) 28'; Maslo (yellow card) 87'	Report	Haugen (yellow card) 38'; Acosta 47'	Stadium: Štadión pod Čebraťom; Attendance: 4,487; Referee: Kevin Clancy (Scotland)

20 July 2017 Second qualifying round 2nd leg	Brann (Norway)	0–2 (1–2 agg.)	(Slovakia) Ružomberok	Bergen, Norway
19:00 CEST (UTC+2)	Haugen (yellow card) 10'; Karadas (yellow card) 87'	Report	Qose 64'; Kružliak 78' (pen.)	Stadium: Brann Stadion; Attendance: 4,688; Referee: Artyom Kuchin (Kazakhstan)

== Squad statistics ==
As of match played 26 November 2017

=== Appearances and goals ===
No.	Pos	Nat	Player	Total		Tippeligaen		Norwegian Cup		UEFA Europa League		Mesterfinalen	
No.	Pos	Nat	Player	Apps	Goals	Apps	Goals	Apps	Goals	Apps	Goals	Apps	Goals
1	GK	(United States) USA	Alex Horwath	9	0	4	0	4	0	1	0	0	0
3	DF	(Netherlands) NED	Vito Wormgoor	29	2	26	2	1	0	2	0	0	0
5	DF	(Norway) NOR	Jonas Grønner	13	3	7+3	2	2	1	0	0	1	0
6	DF	(Iceland) ISL	Viðar Ari Jónsson	14	1	8+3	1	3	0	0	0	0	0
7	MF	(Norway) NOR	Peter Orry Larsen	22	3	6+12	3	2	0	0+2	0	0	0
8	MF	(Norway) NOR	Fredrik Haugen	35	5	29	5	3	0	2	0	1	0
9	MF	(Norway) NOR	Kasper Skaanes	25	1	12+7	1	3+1	0	1+1	0	0	0
10	FW	(Sweden) SWE	Jakob Orlov	29	7	14+9	5	3	2	2	0	1	0
11	FW	(Norway) NOR	Steffen Lie Skålevik	14	2	1+7	0	3	2	1+1	0	0+1	0
12	GK	(Norway) NOR	Markus Olsen Pettersen	1	0	1	0	0	0	0	0	0	0
14	MF	(Netherlands) NED	Ludcinio Marengo	8	1	5+3	1	0	0	0	0	0	0
15	DF	(Costa Rica) CRC	Bismar Acosta	33	2	27	1	3	0	2	1	1	0
17	MF	(Faroe Islands) FRO	Gilli Rólantsson	30	4	24+1	4	0+2	0	2	0	1	0
18	FW	(Norway) NOR	Azar Karadas	24	1	1+18	0	2+1	1	0+2	0	0	0
19	FW	(Costa Rica) CRC	Deyver Vega	21	7	12+6	6	2	1	0	0	1	0
20	MF	(Norway) NOR	Halldor Stenevik	2	1	0	0	1+1	1	0	0	0	0
21	DF	(Norway) NOR	Ruben Kristiansen	33	1	28	1	2	0	2	0	1	0
22	FW	(Norway) NOR	Torgeir Børven	27	4	13+10	3	1+2	1	0	0	0+1	0
23	MF	(Norway) NOR	Sivert Heltne Nilsen	33	2	27	1	3	1	2	0	1	0
24	GK	(Poland) POL	Piotr Leciejewski	27	0	25	0	0	0	1	0	1	0
25	MF	(Norway) NOR	Daniel Braaten	17	3	13+2	3	1	0	0	0	1	0
29	FW	(Norway) NOR	Kristoffer Barmen	30	8	23+1	8	2+1	0	2	0	1	0
33	DF	(Norway) NOR	Amin Nouri	33	1	24+3	1	3	0	2	0	0+1	0
34	FW	(Norway) NOR	Marius Bildøy	3	1	0+1	0	0+2	1	0	0	0	0
Players away from Brann on loan:
Players who left Brann during the season:

=== Goal scorers ===
Place	Position	Nation	Number	Name	Tippeligaen	Norwegian Cup	UEFA Europa League	Mesterfinalen	Total
1	FW	(Norway)	29	Kristoffer Barmen	8	0	0	0	8
2	FW	(Costa Rica)	19	Deyver Vega	6	1	0	0	7
2	FW	(Sweden)	10	Jakob Orlov	5	2	0	0	7
4	MF	(Norway)	8	Fredrik Haugen	5	0	0	0	5
5	DF	(Faroe Islands)	17	Gilli Rólantsson	4	0	0	0	4
5	FW	(Norway)	22	Torgeir Børven	3	1	0	0	4
7	MF	(Norway)	25	Daniel Braaten	3	0	0	0	3
7	MF	(Norway)	7	Peter Orry Larsen	3	0	0	0	3
7	DF	(Norway)	5	Jonas Grønner	2	1	0	0	3
7				Own goal	3	0	0	0	3
11	DF	(Netherlands)	3	Vito Wormgoor	2	0	0	0	2
11	MF	(Norway)	23	Sivert Heltne Nilsen	1	1	0	0	2
11	DF	(Costa Rica)	15	Bismar Acosta	1	0	1	0	2
11	FW	(Norway)	11	Steffen Lie Skålevik	0	2	0	0	2
15	DF	(Norway)	21	Ruben Kristiansen	1	0	0	0	1
15	DF	(Iceland)	6	Viðar Ari Jónsson	1	0	0	0	1
15	DF	(Norway)	33	Amin Nouri	1	0	0	0	1
15	MF	(Norway)	9	Kasper Skaanes	1	0	0	0	1
15	MF	(Netherlands)	14	Ludcinio Marengo	1	0	0	0	1
15	FW	(Norway)	18	Azar Karadas	0	1	0	0	1
15	MF	(Norway)	20	Halldor Stenevik	0	1	0	0	1
15	FW	(Norway)	34	Marius Bildøy	0	1	0	0	1
				TOTALS	51	11	1	0	63

=== Disciplinary record ===
Number	Nation	Position	Name	Tippeligaen		Norwegian Cup		UEFA Europa League		Mesterfinalen		Total	
Number	Nation	Position	Name	Yellow card	Red card	Yellow card	Red card	Yellow card	Red card	Yellow card	Red card	Yellow card	Red card
3	(Netherlands)	DF	Vito Wormgoor	3	0	0	0	0	0	0	0	3	0
5	(Norway)	DF	Jonas Grønner	3	0	0	0	0	0	0	0	3	0
6	(Iceland)	DF	Viðar Ari Jónsson	0	0	2	0	0	0	0	0	2	0
7	(Norway)	MF	Peter Orry Larsen	1	0	0	0	0	0	0	0	1	0
8	(Norway)	MF	Fredrik Haugen	2	0	1	0	2	0	0	0	5	0
9	(Norway)	MF	Kasper Skaanes	1	0	0	0	0	0	0	0	1	0
14	(Netherlands)	MF	Ludcinio Marengo	1	0	0	0	0	0	0	0	1	0
15	(Costa Rica)	DF	Bismar Acosta	5	0	0	0	0	0	1	0	6	0
18	(Norway)	FW	Azar Karadas	2	0	0	0	1	0	0	0	3	0
19	(Costa Rica)	FW	Deyver Vega	3	0	0	0	0	0	1	0	4	0
21	(Norway)	DF	Ruben Kristiansen	1	0	0	0	0	0	0	0	1	0
22	(Norway)	FW	Torgeir Børven	1	0	0	0	0	0	0	0	1	0
23	(Norway)	MF	Sivert Heltne Nilsen	7	1	0	0	0	0	0	0	7	1
24	(Poland)	GK	Piotr Leciejewski	2	0	0	0	0	0	1	0	3	0
25	(Norway)	MF	Daniel Braaten	4	0	0	0	0	0	0	0	4	0
29	(Norway)	FW	Kristoffer Barmen	5	0	0	0	0	0	0	0	5	0
33	(Norway)	DF	Amin Nouri	1	0	0	0	0	0	0	0	1	0
			TOTALS	42	1	3	0	3	0	2	0	50	1
