= 2016 SK Brann season =

Brann
2016 season
- President: Eivind Lunde
- Manager: Lars Arne Nilsen
- Stadium: Brann Stadion
- Tippeligaen: 2nd
- Norwegian Cup: First Round vs Førde
- Top goalscorer: League: Steffen Lie Skålevik (6); All: Steffen Lie Skålevik (6)
Home colours	Away colours

The 2016 season is Brann's first season back in the Tippeligaen since their relegation at the end of the 2014 season.

== Squad ==
As of 31 August 2016

Note: Flags indicate national team as defined under FIFA eligibility rules; some limited exceptions apply. Players may hold more than one non-FIFA nationality.

No.	Pos.	Nation	Player
1	GK	USA	Alex Horwath
5	DF	NOR	Jonas Grønner
6	DF	NOR	Vadim Demidov (Captain)
8	MF	NOR	Fredrik Haugen
9	MF	NOR	Kasper Skaanes
10	FW	SWE	Jakob Orlov
11	FW	NOR	Steffen Lie Skålevik
12	GK	NOR	Markus Olsen Pettersen
13	FW	NOR	Erik Huseklepp (Vice-captain)
15	DF	CRC	Bismark Acosta
16	MF	NOR	Remi Johansen

No.	Pos.	Nation	Player
17	DF	FRO	Gilli Sørensen
18	FW	NOR	Azar Karadas
19	FW	CRC	Deyver Vega
21	DF	NOR	Ruben Kristiansen
22	FW	NOR	Torgeir Børven (on loan from Twente)
23	MF	NOR	Sivert Heltne Nilsen
24	GK	POL	Piotr Leciejewski
25	FW	NOR	Daniel Braaten
29	MF	NOR	Kristoffer Barmen
33	DF	NOR	Amin Nouri
35	MF	NOR	Halldor Stenevik

=== Out on loan ===
Note: Flags indicate national team as defined under FIFA eligibility rules; some limited exceptions apply. Players may hold more than one non-FIFA nationality.

No. / Pos. / Nation / Player; 26 / DF / FIN / Dani Hatakka (at Hødd)	No. / Pos. / Nation / Player; 39 / FW / NOR / Oliver Rotihaug (at Florø)

== Transfers ==
=== Winter ===
In: Note: Flags indicate national team as defined under FIFA eligibility rules; some limited exceptions apply. Players may hold more than one non-FIFA nationality.

No.	Pos.	Nation	Player
10	FW	SWE	Jakob Orlov (loan return from (Sweden) Hammarby)
16	MF	NOR	Remi Johansen (free agent)
19	FW	CRC	Deyver Vega (from (Costa Rica) Deportivo Saprissa)
22	FW	DEN	Mads Dittmer Hvilsom (on loan from (Germany) Eintracht Braunschweig)
25	FW	NOR	Daniel Braaten (free agent)
26	DF	FIN	Dani Hatakka (from (Finland) KuPS)

Out: Note: Flags indicate national team as defined under FIFA eligibility rules; some limited exceptions apply. Players may hold more than one non-FIFA nationality.

No.	Pos.	Nation	Player
3	DF	NOR	Erlend Hanstveit (retired)
4	MF	NOR	Eirik Birkelund (released)
11	FW	CRC	Alejandro Castro (loan return to (Norway) Start, later released)
12	GK	NOR	Kenneth Udjus (released)
12	GK	NOR	Øystein Øvretveit (released, previously on at (Norway) Nest-Sotra)
14	DF	NOR	Fredrik Heggland (on loan to (Norway) Fana)
22	MF	ETH	Amin Askar (to (Turkey) Şanlıurfaspor, previously on loan at (Norway) Sarpsborg 08)
25	MF	LBR	Amadaiya Rennie (loan return to (Sweden) Hammarby)
30	DF	NOR	Fredrik Pallesen Knudsen (on loan to (Norway) Åsane)

=== Summer ===
In: Note: Flags indicate national team as defined under FIFA eligibility rules; some limited exceptions apply. Players may hold more than one non-FIFA nationality.

No.	Pos.	Nation	Player
17	DF	FRO	Gilli Sørensen (from (Denmark) AaB)
22	FW	NOR	Torgeir Børven (on loan from (Netherlands) Twente)

Out: Note: Flags indicate national team as defined under FIFA eligibility rules; some limited exceptions apply. Players may hold more than one non-FIFA nationality.

No.	Pos.	Nation	Player
7	MF	NOR	Kristoffer Larsen (to (Denmark) Lyngby)
17	DF	NOR	Viljar Vevatne (to (Norway) Sandnes Ulf)
20	FW	NOR	Håkon Lorentzen (released)
22	FW	DEN	Mads Dittmer Hvilsom (loan return to (Germany) Eintracht Braunschweig, later loaned to (Denmark) Esbjerg)
26	DF	FIN	Dani Hatakka (on loan to (Norway) Hødd)
39	FW	NOR	Oliver Rotihaug (on loan to (Norway) Florø)

== Competitions ==
=== Tippeligaen ===
==== Results summary ====
Overall								Home						Away					
Pld	W	D	L	GF	GA	GD	Pts	W	D	L	GF	GA	GD	W	D	L	GF	GA	GD
30	16	6	8	42	27	+15	54	11	3	1	24	6	+18	5	3	7	18	21	−3

Last updated: 8 November 2016.
Source: see Results

==== Results by round ====
Round	1	2	3	4	5	6	7	8	9	10	11	12	13	14	15	16	17	18	19	20	21	22	23	24	25	26	27	28	29	30
Ground	A	H	A	H	A	A	H	A	H	A	H	A	H	A	H	A	H	A	H	A	H	A	H	A	H	A	H	H	A	H
Result	D	D	W	W	L	W	W	L	W	L	W	L	W	L	W	D	W	W	W	L	D	L	D	W	W	D	L	W	W	W
Position	6	9	6	4	5	4	4	5	5	6	6	6	6	6	4	5	4	3	3	3	3	4	4	2	2	2	2	2	2	2

Updated to match(es) played on 30 October 2016. Source: see Results
A = Away; H = Home; W = Win; D = Draw; L = Loss

==== Results ====
13 March 2016 1	Strømsgodset	2–2	Brann	Drammen
18:00 CET (UTC+1)	Storflor 4'; Høiland 34' (yellow card) 77'; Kastrati (red card) 73'	Summary	Huseklepp 45'; Orlov 75'	Stadium: Marienlyst Stadion; Attendance: 7,394; Referee: Svein Oddvar Moen

20 March 2016 2	Brann	0–0	Odd	Bergen
18:00 CET (UTC+1)	Demidov (yellow card) 26'; Skålevik (yellow card) 78'	Summary	Samuelsen (yellow card) 82'	Stadium: Brann Stadion; Attendance: 11,495; Referee: Tore Hansen

3 April 2016 3	Aalesunds	1–2	Brann	Ålesund
18:00 CEST (UTC+2)	Larsen 6', (yellow card) 35'; Gyasi (yellow card) 25'	Summary	Braaten (yellow card) 43'; Johansen (yellow card) 53', (goal) 59'; Karadas 83'; Kristiansen (yellow card) 90+1'	Stadium: Color Line Stadion; Attendance: 10,013; Referee: Tom Harald Hagen

10 April 2016 4	Brann	1–0	Bodø/Glimt	Bergen
15:30 CEST (UTC+2)	Orlov 9'	Summary		Stadium: Brann Stadion; Attendance: 11,886; Referee: Ola Hobber Nilsen

16 April 2016 5	Rosenborg	3–0	Brann	Trondheim
18:00 CEST (UTC+2)	Vilhjálmsson 36' de Lanlay 69'; Jensen 90+1' (pen.)	Summary	Karadas (yellow card) 89'	Stadium: Lerkendal Stadion; Attendance: 19,399; Referee: Trygve Kjensli

21 April 2016 6	Viking	0–1	Brann	Stavanger
19:00 CEST (UTC+2)		Summary	Vega (yellow card) 52'; Acosta (yellow card) 56'; Grønner (yellow card) 87'; Haugen 90+4'	Stadium: Viking Stadion; Attendance: 11,089; Referee: Dag Vidar Hafsås

23 April 2016 7	Brann	2–0	Sogndal	Bergen
18:00 CEST (UTC+2)	Acosta 24'; Haugen 51'	Summary		Stadium: Brann Stadion; Attendance: 11,628; Referee: Trond Ivar Døvle

1 May 2016 8	Tromsø	1–0	Brann	Tromsø
18:00 CEST (UTC+2)	Moussa 7'; Sigurðarson (yellow card) 33'; Antonsen (yellow card) 39'	Summary	Hvilsom (yellow card) 49'; Acosta (yellow card) 78'	Stadium: Alfheim Stadion; Attendance: 4,030; Referee: Tommy Skjerven

7 May 2016 9	Brann	1–0	Start	Bergen
19:00 CEST (UTC+2)	Skålevik 61'; Nilsen (yellow card) 85'	Summary	Ajer (yellow card) 45+1'; Nwakali (yellow card) 67'	Stadium: Brann Stadion; Attendance: 9,767; Referee: Espen Eskås

11 May 2016 10	Lillestrøm	1–0	Brann	Kjeller
CEST (UTC+2)	Knudtzon 43'	Summary	Demidov (yellow card) 28'; Acosta (yellow card) 52'; Haugen (yellow card) 80'	Stadium: Åråsen Stadion; Attendance: 5,317; Referee: Ken André Johnsen

16 May 2016 11	Brann	1–0	Stabæk	Bergen
18:00 CEST (UTC+2)	Nilsen 47'	Summary	Meling (yellow card) 83'	Stadium: Brann Stadion; Attendance: 17,686; Referee: Svein Oddvar Moen

21 May 2016 12	Molde	2–0	Brann	Molde
18:00 CEST (UTC+2)	Aursnes 83' (pen.); Gulbrandsen 88'	Summary	Barmen (yellow card) 56'; Kristiansen (yellow card) 73'	Stadium: Aker Stadion; Attendance: 9,026; Referee: Dag Vidar Hafsås

29 May 2016 13	Brann	1–0	Haugesund	Bergen
18:00 CEST (UTC+2)	Haugen (yellow card) 25'; Braaten (yellow card) 42'; Skålevik 50'; Leciejewski (yellow card) 90+2'	Summary		Stadium: Brann Stadion; Attendance: 11,011; Referee: Svein-Erik Edvartsen

3 July 2016 14	Sarpsborg 08	1–0	Brann	Sarpsborg
18:00 CEST (UTC+2)	Kirkevold 60'	Summary	Nilsen (yellow card) 33'; Grønner (yellow card) 35'; Skaanes (yellow card) 76'; Vega (yellow card) 90+1'; Johansen (yellow card) 90+4'	Stadium: Sarpsborg Stadion; Attendance: 4,370; Referee: Kim Andre Johnsen

9 July 2016 15	Brann	4–1	Vålerenga	Bergen
18:00 CEST (UTC+2)	Barmen 40'; Vega 52'; Skålevik 82'; Huseklepp 85'	Summary	Tollås (yellow card) 17'; Abdellaoue 20'	Stadium: Brann Stadion; Attendance: 10,482; Referee: Tom Harald Hagen

17 July 2016 16	Stabæk	1–1	Brann	Bærum
18:00 CEST (UTC+2)	Issah (yellow card) 50', (goal) 72'; Kassi (yellow card) 85'	Summary	Karadas 67'	Stadium: Nadderud Stadion; Attendance: 3,894; Referee: Dag Vidar Hafsås

22 July 2016 17	Brann	6–0	Aalesunds	Bergen
19:00 CEST (UTC+2)	Acosta 23'; Skagestad 38' (o.g.); Nilsen 59'; Huseklepp 65' (pen.); Grønner (yellow card) 71'; Karadas 77', 85'	Summary	Grétarsson (red card) 65'	Stadium: Brann Stadion; Attendance: 10,348; Referee: Svein-Erik Edvartsen

31 July 2016 18	Odd	1–3	Brann	Skien
18:00 CEST (UTC+2)	Samuelsen (yellow card) 73'; Occéan 80' (yellow card) 81'	Summary	Demidov (yellow card) 2' (goal) 44'; Nilsen (yellow card) 59'; S.Skålevik (yellow card) 69'; Haugen 88', 90'	Stadium: Skagerak Arena; Attendance: 8,025; Referee: Ola Hobber Nilsen

7 August 2016 19	Brann	1–0	Strømsgodset	Bergen
18:00 CEST (UTC+2)	Vega 36'	Summary		Stadium: Brann Stadion; Attendance: 11,886; Referee: Kim Andre Johnsen

13 August 2016 20	Vålerenga	3–2	Brann	Oslo
18:00 CEST (UTC+2)	Zahid 31', 90+2'; Juklerød 45+1'; Grindheim (yellow card) 73'; Holm (yellow card) 82'	Summary	Barmen 14'; Vega (yellow card) 49'; Nilsen 55'; Acosta (yellow card) 71'	Stadium: Ullevaal Stadion; Attendance: 9,866; Referee: Svein Oddvar Moen

21 August 2016 21	Brann	1–1	Rosenborg	Bergen
18:00 CEST (UTC+2)	Orlov 3'; Demidov (yellow card) 55'; Barmen (yellow card) 57'; Heltne Nilsen (yellow card) 65'	Summary	Gytkjær 69'	Stadium: Brann Stadion; Attendance: 17,366; Referee: Tore Hansen

27 August 2016 22	Haugesund	3–2	Brann	Haugesund
18:00 CEST (UTC+2)	Hajradinović 36' (pen.) (yellow card) 49'; Troost-Ekong 45+1'; Haraldseid 81'	Summary	Barmen 28' (yellow card) 45'; Skålevik 30' (yellow card) 60'; Nilsen (yellow card) 35'; Demidov (yellow card) 90+2'; Kristiansen (yellow card) 90+3'	Stadium: Haugesund Stadion; Attendance: 7,130; Referee: Trond Ivar Døvle

10 September 2016 23	Brann	0–0	Viking	Bergen
18:00 CEST (UTC+2)		Summary		Stadium: Brann Stadion; Attendance: 11,674; Referee: Tom Harald Hagen

18 September 2016 24	Bodø/Glimt	1–3	Brann	Bodø
18:00 CEST (UTC+2)	Azemi 18'; Edvardsen (yellow card) 23'; Normann (yellow card) 39'; Bjørnbak (yellow card) 78'; Manzon (yellow card) 90'	Summary	Barmen 13', 55' (yellow card) 65'; Haugen (yellow card) 40'; Orlov 48'; Braaten (yellow card) 74'; Vega (yellow card) 85'; Acosta (yellow card) 90'; Karadas (yellow card) 90+1'	Stadium: Aspmyra Stadion; Attendance: 7,564; Referee: Espen Eskås

25 September 2016 25	Brann	1–0	Tromsø	Bergen
20:00 CEST (UTC+2)	Vega 28'; Haugen (yellow card) 58'; Barmen (yellow card) 90+3'	Summary		Stadium: Brann Stadion; Attendance: 9,331; Referee: Svein Oddvar Moen

1 October 2016 26	Sogndal	0–0	Brann	Sogndalsfjøra
18:00 CEST (UTC+2)	Ramsland (yellow card) 32'; Bolseth (yellow card) 58'; Furebotn (yellow card) 61'	Summary	Acosta (red card) 32'; Braaten (yellow card) 86'; Leciejewski (yellow card) 90+3'	Stadium: Fosshaugane Campus; Attendance: 5,600; Referee: Martin Lundby

16 October 2016 27	Brann	1–2	Lillestrøm	Bergen
18:00 CEST (UTC+2)	Karadas 55'	Summary	Matthew 30' (yellow card) 69'; Jradi (yellow card) 65'; Martin (yellow card) 66'; Knudtzon 85'	Stadium: Brann Stadion; Attendance: 11,876; Referee: Ola Hobber Nilsen

22 October 2016 28	Brann	2–1	Molde	Bergen
18:00 CEST (UTC+2)	Skålevik (yellow card) 10' (goal) 40', 58'; Demidov (yellow card) 16'	Summary	Sarr (yellow card) 29'; Strand 35'; Forren (yellow card) 59'	Stadium: Brann Stadion; Attendance: 11,581; Referee: Svein Oddvar Moen

30 October 2016 29	Start	1–2	Brann	Kristiansand
18:00 CET (UTC+1)	Heikkilä (yellow card) 17'; Sandnes 66'	Summary	Braaten (yellow card) 53'; Grønner (yellow card) 55'; Huseklepp 71'; Haugen 78'	Stadium: Sør Arena; Attendance: 4,524; Referee: Tom Harald Hagen

6 November 2016 30	Brann	2–1	Sarpsborg 08	Bergen
18:00 CET (UTC+1)	Orlov 18'; Karadas (yellow card) 41'; Sørensen 43'; Demidov (yellow card) 73'; Haugen (yellow card) 90+3'	Summary	Mortensen 90+2'	Stadium: Brann Stadion; Attendance: 17,686; Referee: Dag Vidar Hafsås

==== Table ====
Pos	Team	Pld	W	D	L	GF	GA	GD	Pts	Qualification or relegation
1	Rosenborg (C)	30	21	6	3	65	25	+40	69	Qualification for the Champions League second qualifying round (Note: Rosenborg qualified for the Europa League second qualifying round by winning the 2016 Norwegian Cup. However, since they already qualified for European competition based on their league position, the spot awarded to the cup winners was passed down the league.)
2	Brann	30	16	6	8	42	27	+15	54	Qualification for the Europa League second qualifying round
3	Odd	30	15	6	9	44	35	+9	51	Qualification for the Europa League first qualifying round
4	Haugesund	30	12	10	8	47	43	+4	46	Qualification for the Europa League first qualifying round
5	Molde	30	13	6	11	48	42	+6	45	

Source: Football Association of Norway (in Norwegian), Soccerway
Rules for classification: 1) Points; 2) Goal difference; 3) Goals scored; 4) Head-to-head points; 5) Head-to-head goal difference; 6) Head-to-head away goals scored (between two teams).
(C) Champions

=== Norwegian Cup ===
13 April 2016 First Round	Førde	0–0 (a.e.t.) (5–4 p)	Brann	Førde
18:00 CEST (UTC+2)	V.Rygh (yellow card) 32'; Ø.Myrkaskog (yellow card) 72'	Summary	Skålevik (yellow card) 105'	Stadium: Førde stadion Attendance: 2,200; Referee: Steinar Hauge
	Penalties
	K.Iversen (penalty scored); V.Savland (penalty scored); S.Melhus (penalty scored); O.Myrkaskog (penalty scored); M.Attila (penalty scored)		(penalty scored) Grønner; (penalty missed) Acosta; (penalty scored) Nilsen; (penalty scored) Skålevik; (penalty scored) Barmen

== Squad statistics ==
As of match played 6 November 2016

=== Appearances and goals ===
No.	Pos	Nat	Player	Total		Tippeligaen		Norwegian Cup	
No.	Pos	Nat	Player	Apps	Goals	Apps	Goals	Apps	Goals
1	GK	(United States) USA	Alex Horwath	4	0	3	0	1	0
5	DF	(Norway) NOR	Jonas Grønner	16	0	12+3	0	1	0
6	DF	(Norway) NOR	Vadim Demidov	26	1	26	1	0	0
8	MF	(Norway) NOR	Fredrik Haugen	28	5	23+4	5	0+1	0
9	MF	(Norway) NOR	Kasper Skaanes	16	0	9+7	0	0	0
10	FW	(Sweden) SWE	Jakob Orlov	24	5	22+2	5	0	0
11	FW	(Norway) NOR	Steffen Lie Skålevik	19	6	8+10	6	0+1	0
13	FW	(Norway) NOR	Erik Huseklepp	26	4	9+17	4	0	0
15	DF	(Costa Rica) CRC	Bismark Acosta	20	2	19	2	1	0
16	MF	(Norway) NOR	Remi Johansen	12	1	4+7	1	1	0
17	DF	(Faroe Islands) FRO	Gilli Sørensen	7	1	6+1	1	0	0
18	FW	(Norway) NOR	Azar Karadas	25	5	2+22	5	1	0
19	MF	(Costa Rica) CRC	Deyver Vega	19	2	15+3	2	0+1	0
21	DF	(Norway) NOR	Ruben Kristiansen	28	0	28	0	0	0
22	FW	(Norway) NOR	Torgeir Børven	4	0	2+2	0	0	0
23	MF	(Norway) NOR	Sivert Heltne Nilsen	29	3	28	3	1	0
24	GK	(Poland) POL	Piotr Leciejewski	27	0	27	0	0	0
25	FW	(Norway) NOR	Daniel Braaten	25	0	25	0	0	0
29	MF	(Norway) NOR	Kristoffer Barmen	26	5	24+1	5	1	0
33	DF	(Norway) NOR	Amin Nouri	30	0	30	0	0	0
35	MF	(Norway) NOR	Halldor Stenevik	2	0	0+2	0	0	0
Players away from Brann on loan:
26	DF	(Finland) FIN	Dani Hatakka	2	0	1	0	1	0
Players who appeared for Brann no longer at the club:
7	FW	(Norway) NOR	Kristoffer Larsen	6	0	0+5	0	1	0
17	DF	(Norway) NOR	Viljar Vevatne	1	0	0	0	1	0
22	FW	(Denmark) DEN	Mads Hvilsom	11	0	7+3	0	1	0

=== Goal scorers ===
Place	Position	Nation	Number	Name	Tippeligaen	Norwegian Cup	Total
1	FW	(Norway)	11	Steffen Lie Skålevik	6	0	6
2	MF	(Norway)	29	Kristoffer Barmen	5	0	5
2	FW	(Norway)	18	Azar Karadas	5	0	5
2	MF	(Norway)	8	Fredrik Haugen	5	0	5
2	FW	(Sweden)	10	Jakob Orlov	5	0	5
6	FW	(Norway)	13	Erik Huseklepp	4	0	4
7	MF	(Norway)	23	Sivert Heltne Nilsen	3	0	3
8	DF	(Costa Rica)	15	Bismark Acosta	2	0	2
8	FW	(Costa Rica)	19	Deyver Vega	2	0	2
8				Own goal	2	0	2
11	MF	(Norway)	16	Remi Johansen	1	0	1
11	DF	(Norway)	6	Vadim Demidov	1	0	1
11	DF	(Faroe Islands)	17	Gilli Sørensen	1	0	1
				TOTALS	42	0	42

=== Disciplinary record ===
Number	Nation	Position	Name	Tippeligaen		Norwegian Cup		Total	
Number	Nation	Position	Name	Yellow card	Red card	Yellow card	Red card	Yellow card	Red card
5	(Norway)	DF	Jonas Grønner	3	0	0	0	3	0
6	(Norway)	DF	Vadim Demidov	7	0	0	0	7	0
8	(Norway)	MF	Fredrik Haugen	6	0	0	0	6	0
9	(Norway)	MF	Kasper Skaanes	1	0	0	0	1	0
11	(Norway)	FW	Steffen Lie Skålevik	4	0	1	0	5	0
15	(Costa Rica)	DF	Bismark Acosta	5	1	0	0	5	1
16	(Norway)	MF	Remi Johansen	2	0	0	0	2	0
18	(Norway)	FW	Azar Karadas	3	0	0	0	3	0
19	(Costa Rica)	FW	Deyver Vega	4	0	0	0	4	0
21	(Norway)	DF	Ruben Kristiansen	3	0	0	0	3	0
22	(Denmark)	FW	Mads Dittmer Hvilsom	1	0	0	0	1	0
23	(Norway)	MF	Sivert Heltne Nilsen	5	0	0	0	5	0
24	(Poland)	GK	Piotr Leciejewski	2	0	0	0	2	0
25	(Norway)	FW	Daniel Braaten	5	0	0	0	5	0
29	(Norway)	MF	Kristoffer Barmen	5	0	0	0	5	0
			TOTALS	56	1	1	0	57	1
