= Deyver Vega =

Costa Rican footballer (born 1992)

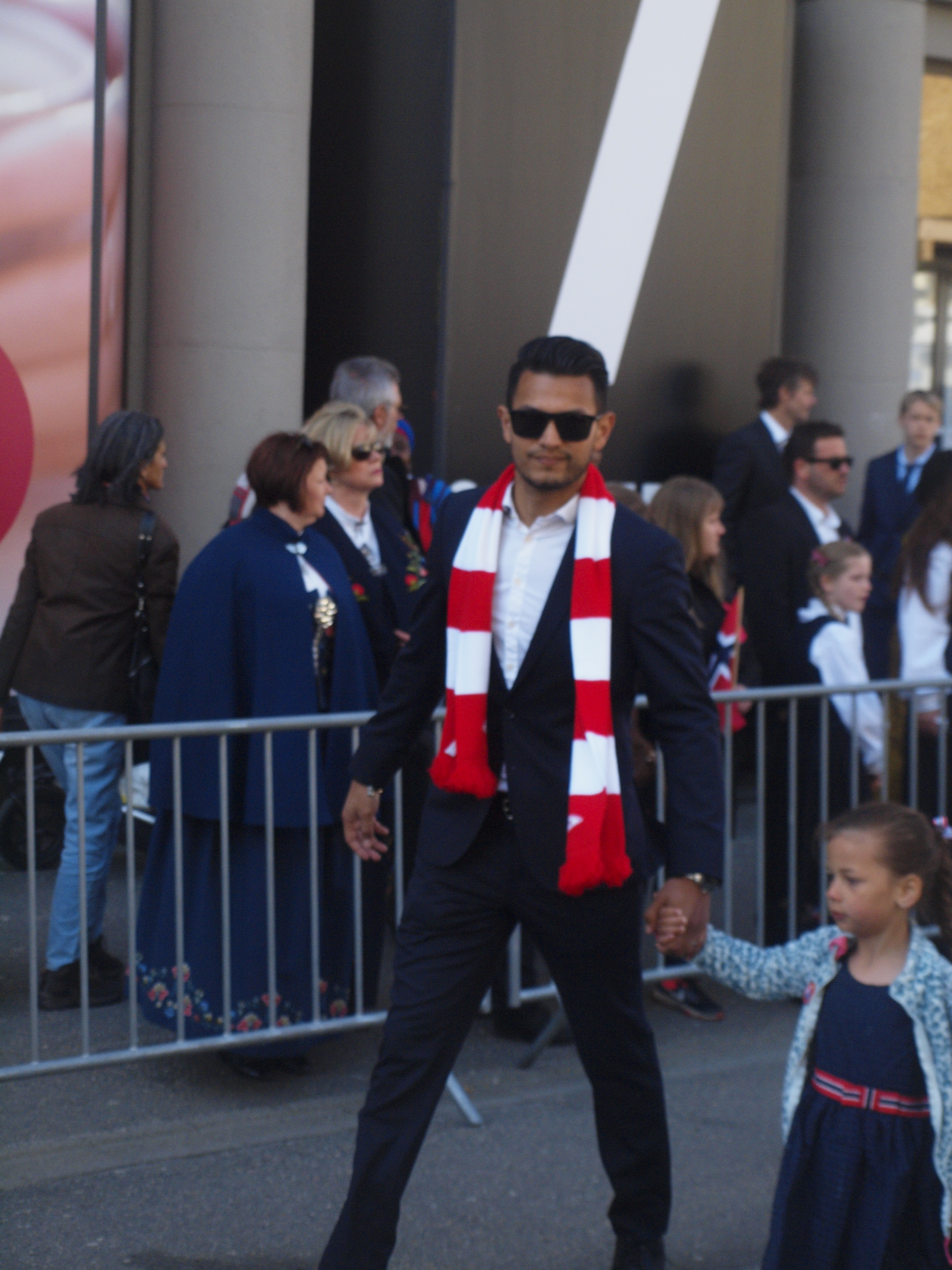
- Vega in 2018

Personal information
- Full name: Deyver Antonio de jesus Vegastro Álvarez
- Date of birth: 19 September 1992 (age 34)
- Place of birth: Ciudad Quesada, Costa Rica
- Height: 1.76 m (5 ft 9 in)
- Position: Winger

Team information
- Current team: Deportivo Saprissa
- Number: 15

Youth career
- –2009: Deportivo Saprissa

Senior career*
Years	Team	Apps	(Gls)
2009–2011	Generación Saprissa	0	(0)
2010–2011	→ Grecia (loan)	0	(0)
2012–2016	Deportivo Saprissa	131	(24)
2016–2020	Brann	48	(9)
2020	Vålerenga	29	(3)
2020	Sandefjord	14	(1)
2021	Politehnica Iași	14	(1)
2021–2022	Sandefjord	24	(2)
2023–2024	Herediano	24	(2)
2024–	Deportivo Saprissa	25	(2)

International career^{‡}
2009	Costa Rica U17	3	(0)
2011	Costa Rica U20	10	(1)
2015–	Costa Rica	12	(0)
- * Club domestic league appearances and goals as of 5 April 2025 ‡ National team caps and goals as of 14 November 2020

Deyver Vega (born 19 September 1992) is a Costa Rican professional footballer who plays for Deportivo Saprissa and the Costa Rica national team as a forward.

== Club career ==
Vega signed for Tippeligaen side SK Brann on 2 March 2016, on a contract until the summer of 2019.

== International career ==
At the youth level he played in both the 2009 FIFA U-17 World Cup and the 2011 FIFA U-20 World Cup.

Vega was called up to the Costa Rica senior team for the 2015 CONCACAF Gold Cup and played in Costa Rica's opening game.

== Career statistics ==
=== Club ===
As of match played 23 April 2022

Club	Season	League			National Cup		Continental		Total	
Club	Season	Division	Apps	Goals	Apps	Goals	Apps	Goals	Apps	Goals
Deportivo Saprissa	2011–12	Costa Rican Primera División	7	1	–		–		7	1
Deportivo Saprissa	2012–13	Costa Rican Primera División	29	5	–		–		29	5
Deportivo Saprissa	2013–14	Costa Rican Primera División	18	1	–		–		18	1
Deportivo Saprissa	2014–15	Costa Rican Primera División	43	9	–		3	0	46	9
Deportivo Saprissa	2015–16	Costa Rican Primera División	16	4	–		3	1	19	5
Deportivo Saprissa	Total		113	20	0	0	6	1	119	21
Brann	2016	Tippeligaen	18	2	1	0	–		19	2
Brann	2017	Eliteserien	18	6	2	1	–		20	7
Brann	2018	Eliteserien	12	1	4	4	–		16	5
Brann	Total		48	9	7	5	0	0	55	14
Vålerenga	2019	Eliteserien	23	2	1	1	–		24	3
Vålerenga	2020	Eliteserien	6	1	0	0	–		6	1
Vålerenga	Total		29	3	1	1	0	0	30	4
Sandefjord	2020	Eliteserien	14	1	0	0	–		14	1
Sandefjord	Total		14	1	0	0	0	0	14	1
Politehnica Iași	2020–21	Liga I	14	1	1	0	–		15	1
Politehnica Iași	Total		14	1	1	0	0	0	15	1
Sandefjord	2021	Eliteserien	5	0	0	0	–		5	0
Sandefjord	2022	Eliteserien	4	1	0	0	–		4	1
Sandefjord	Total		9	1	0	0	0	0	9	1
Career total			227	35	9	5	6	1	242	42

=== International ===
As of match played 14 November 2020

Costa Rica national team
Year	Apps	Goals
2015	8	0
2016	0	0
2017	3	0
2018	0	0
2019	0	0
2020	1	0
Total	12	0

== Honours ==
=== Club ===
Deportivo Saprissa

- Liga FPD: Clausura 2014, Apertura 2014, Apertura 2015
- Costa Rican Cup: 2013
