= Sivert Heltne Nilsen =

Norwegian footballer (born 1991)

Personal information
- Date of birth: 2 October 1991 (age 35)
- Place of birth: Bergen, Norway
- Height: 1.85 m (6 ft 1 in)
- Position: Central midfielder

Team information
- Current team: Haugesund
- Number: 14

Youth career
- Volda

Senior career*
Years	Team	Apps	(Gls)
2009–2013	Hødd	116	(8)
2014–2015	Vålerenga	41	(0)
2015–2018	Brann	80	(6)
2018–2019	Horsens	32	(1)
2019–2021	Elfsborg	33	(2)
2021	Waasland-Beveren	9	(0)
2021–2024	Brann	88	(14)
2024–2026	Aberdeen	40	(1)
2026–	Haugesund	29	(2)

International career^{‡}
2013–2015	Norway U23	2	(0)
- * Club domestic league appearances and goals as of 14 November 2026 ‡ National team caps and goals as of 26 March 2015

Sivert Heltne Nilsen (born 2 October 1991) is a Norwegian footballer who plays as a midfielder for Norwegian First Division club Haugesund. He has previously played for IL Hødd, Vålerenga Fotball, SK Brann, AC Horsens, IF Elfsborg and Waasland-Beveren and has represented his country at youth level. He is the son of former Hødd and Brann manager Lars Arne Nilsen.

== Club career ==
Heltne Nilsen started his professional career at Norwegian Second Division side IL Hødd. He started the 2012 Norwegian Football Cup final, playing the full match and scoring in the penalty shootout to help his team win its first cup title.

In January 2014, Heltne Nilsen moved to Vålerenga. He went to SK Brann in July 2015.

In July 2018, Heltne Nilsen moved to Danish Superliga side AC Horsens. He signed a five-year contract with the club, but was sold to Swedish club IF Elfsborg in 2019. After a brief spell with Belgium's Waasland-Beveren, Heltne Nilsen rejoined Brann for three years. In 2024, he reunited with former manager Jimmy Thelin at the latter's new club, Aberdeen, in the Scottish Premiership.

== Career statistics ==
As of 14 November 2026

Club	Season	League			National cup (Note: Includes Norwegian Cup, Danish Cup, Svenska Cupen, Belgian Cup, Scottish Cup)		League cup (Note: Includes Scottish League Cup)		Europe		Other		Total	
Club	Season	Division	Apps	Goals	Apps	Goals	Apps	Goals	Apps	Goals	Apps	Goals	Apps	Goals
Hødd	2009	2. divisjon	10	0	0	0	—		—		—		10	0
Hødd	2010	2. divisjon	19	1	0	0	—		—		—		19	1
Hødd	2011	1. divisjon	29	1	1	0	—		—		—		30	1
Hødd	2012	1. divisjon	29	3	7	0	—		—		—		36	3
Hødd	2013	1. divisjon	29	3	3	0	—		1 (Note: Appearance(s) in UEFA Europa League)	0	1 (Note: Appearance in 1. divisjon promotion play-offs)	0	34	3
Hødd	Total		116	8	11	0	—		1	0	1	0	129	8
Vålerenga	2014	Eliteserien	28	0	3	3	—		—		—		31	3
Vålerenga	2015	Eliteserien	13	0	1	0	—		—		—		14	0
Vålerenga	Total		41	0	4	3	—		—		—		45	3
Brann	2015	1. divisjon	10	0	0	0	—		—		—		10	0
Brann	2016	Eliteserien	28	3	1	0	—		—		—		29	3
Brann	2017	Eliteserien	27	1	3	1	—		2	0	1 (Note: Appearance in Mesterfinalen)	0	33	2
Brann	2018	Eliteserien	15	2	3	0	—		—		—		18	2
Brann	Total		80	6	7	1	—		2	0	1	0	90	7
Horsens	2018–19	Danish Superliga	27	1	0	0	—		—		1 (Note: Appearance in Danish Superliga relegation play-offs)	0	28	1
Horsens	2019–20	Danish Superliga	5	0	0	0	—		—		—		5	0
Horsens	Total		32	1	0	0	—		—		1	0	33	1
Elfsborg	2019	Allsvenskan	10	1	0	0	—		—		—		10	1
Elfsborg	2020	Allsvenskan	23	1	3	0	—		—		—		26	1
Elfsborg	Total		33	2	3	0	—		—		—		36	2
Waasland-Beveren	2020–21	Belgian First Division A	9	0	1	0	—		—		2 (Note: Appearances in Belgian First Division Relegation play-offs)	0	12	0
Waasland-Beveren	Total		9	0	1	0	—		—		2	0	12	0
Brann	2021	Eliteserien	15	0	1	0	—		—		1 (Note: Appearance in Eliteserien play-offs)	1	17	1
Brann	2022	1. divisjon	29	5	3	0	—		—		—		32	5
Brann	2023	Eliteserien	29	9	8	1	—		4 (Note: Appearances in UEFA Conference League)	0	—		41	10
Brann	2024	Eliteserien	15	2	3	0	—		—		—		18	2
Brann	Total		88	14	15	1	—		4	0	1	1	108	16
Aberdeen	2024–25	Scottish Premiership	26	0	2	0	6	0	—		—		34	0
Aberdeen	2025–26	Scottish Premiership	14	1	3	0	1	1	4	0	—		22	2
Aberdeen	Total		40	1	5	0	7	1	4	0	—		56	2
Haugesund	2026	Norwegian First Division	29	2	3	0	—		—		—		32	2
Career Total			468	35	49	5	7	1	11	0	6	0	541	41

== Honours ==
Hødd

- Norwegian Cup: 2012

Brann

- 1. divisjon: 2022
- Norwegian Cup: 2022–23

Aberdeen

- Scottish Cup: 2024–25
