= Azar Karadas =

Norwegian footballer (born 1981)

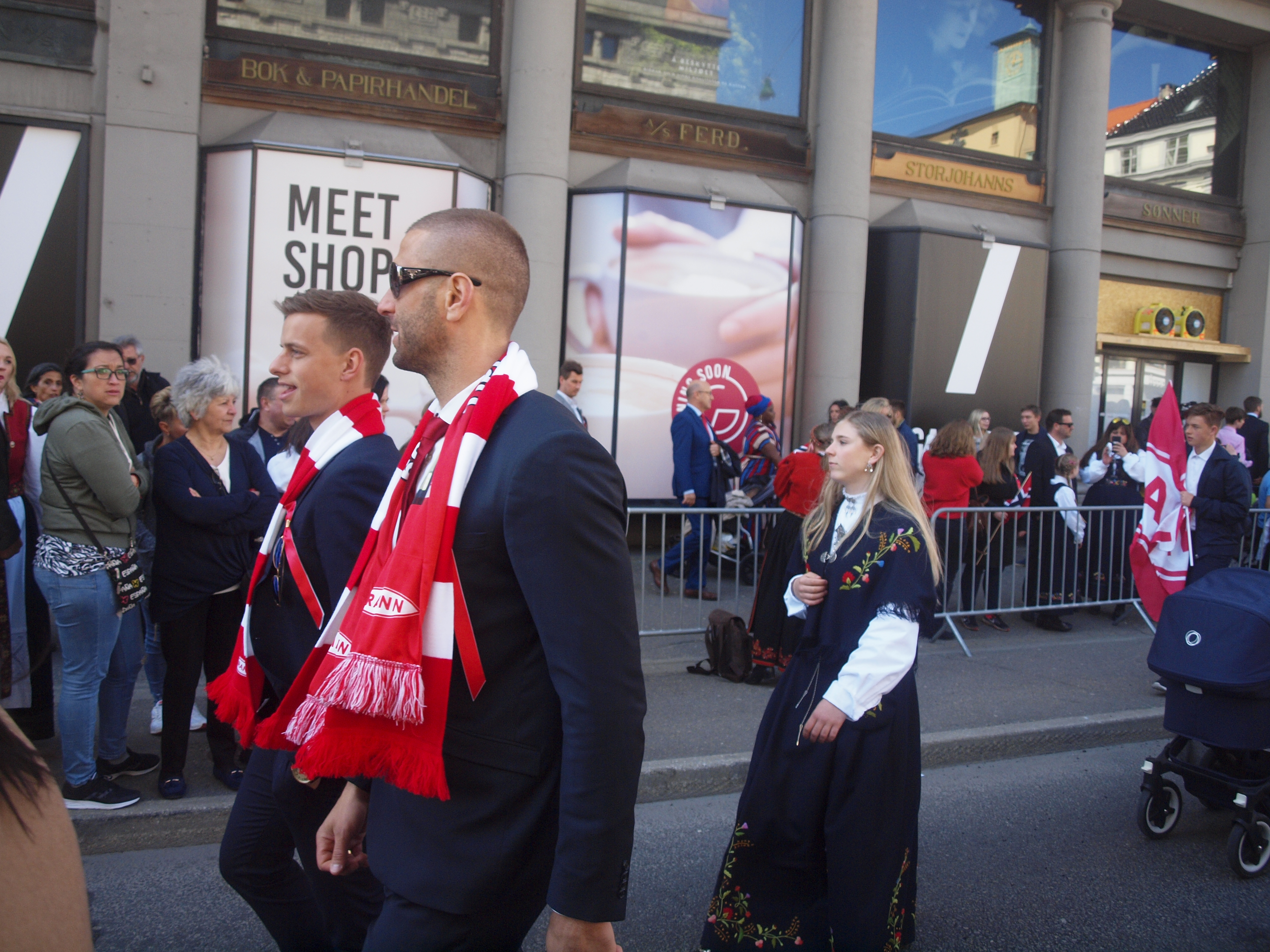
- Karadas (in sunglasses) with Brann in 2018

Personal information
- Full name: Azar Karadas
- Date of birth: 9 August 1981 (age 45)
- Place of birth: Nordfjordeid, Norway
- Height: 1.89 m (6 ft 2 in)
- Positions: Centre back; forward

Team information
- Current team: Start (Head coach)

Youth career
- –1998: Eid IL

Senior career*
Years	Team	Apps	(Gls)
1999–2001	Brann	50	(12)
2002–2004	Rosenborg	60	(13)
2004–2007	Benfica	27	(4)
2005–2006	→ Portsmouth (loan)	20	(1)
2006–2007	→ Kaiserslautern (loan)	11	(1)
2007–2009	Brann	48	(10)
2009–2012	Kasımpaşa	36	(2)
2012–2014	Sogndal	44	(4)
2014–2019	Brann	107	(10)

International career
1999–2000	Norway U21	33	(12)
2001–2008	Norway	10	(1)

Managerial career
- 2020: Brann 2 (assistant)
- 2021–2023: Brann 2
- 2023–2024: Stabæk (assistant)
- 2024–: Start
- * Club domestic league appearances and goals

Azar Karadas (Turkish: Azar Karadaş; born 9 August 1981) is a Norwegian former footballer. Although he could also play as a central defender, he operated primarily as a centre forward.

He had three spells with Brann, where he began and ended his career, winning Tippeligaen with that team and with Rosenborg. He also competed professionally in Portugal, England, Germany and Turkey.

== Club career ==
Karadas was born in Nordfjordeid of Turkish origin, his surname meaning "Black Stone" in Turkish. He started his career with Eid IL, moving to the professionals in 1999 with SK Brann.

On 13 March 2002, Karadas signed for Rosenborg BK, reportedly receiving death threats over this move. At his new club, his performances soon earned him a call-up to the Norwegian under-21s, and it was not long before foreign eyes focused on him. He further enhanced his reputation by scoring two goals against Inter Milan in a UEFA Champions League game, a 2–2 home draw; he was linked with the likes of Roda JC, Liverpool and Udinese Calcio, but Portuguese club S.L. Benfica eventually bought the 23-year-old, and he joined the squad of veteran coach Giovanni Trapattoni after signing a four-year contract.

After one season at Benfica, where he scored four goals (including a brace at S.C. Beira-Mar in a 3–2 win) and helped them win the Primeira Liga championship after 11 years, Karadas was loaned to Premier League side Portsmouth for 2005–06. His volley, which helped the relegation-threatened team earn a crucial 1–1 draw against Bolton Wanderers on 1 February 2006, was both his highlight and only goal of the campaign, in 20 overall appearances.

A 16 June 2006 Norwegian press release reported that Benfica and Brann had agreed on a Karadas transfer back to Bergen. The deal was speculated to be worth £695,000 (€102,000), where he was to give up £435,000 worth of bonuses Benfica owed him. Only his personal contract was an issue, as the player refused to give up a £350,000 compensation which had to be paid to him whenever he was sold from the Lisbon club.

Despite being declared unwanted in Lisbon, Karadas returned to Benfica after his transfer to Brann fell through. On 16 August 2006, news broke out that he was in negotiations with Germany's 1. FC Kaiserslautern, which had just been relegated to the 2. Bundesliga; the clubs finally agreed with a one-year loan deal, brokered by his uncle who was also his agent.

Karadas made his debut in German football on 27 August 2006 in a 2–0 home league victory over SC Paderborn 07, starting but being substituted in the 61st minute. On 9 September he scored his first goal for his new team, in its 2–0 away victory over amateurs 1. FC Gera 03 for the first round of the German Cup. His first league goal came 20 days later in a 1–1 draw at SpVgg Unterhaching, his only of the season in an eventual sixth-place finish; he was also sent off after being shown two yellow cards in a local derby against 1. FC Köln, which ended in a 2–2 draw.

On 24 August 2007, Karadas signed a contract with Brann for a second spell with the club. In his comeback to Brann Stadion, in a match against Sandefjord Fotball on 2 September, he was greeted as a hero and a banner stating "Vi hatet deg så mye, fordi vi elsker deg så høyt!" ("We hated you so much, because we love you so much!"). The season ended with Tippeligaen conquest, with four goals in only eight appearances from the player.

On 1 September 2009, Karadas signed a three-year contract with Kasımpaşa S.K. of Turkey, scoring only once in seven contests in his debut campaign as the team ranked 11th the Süper Lig. On 27 May 2012 he netted a critical goal that brought his team back to the top flight, in the play-off match against Adanaspor.

Karadas joined Sogndal Fotball in August 2012, on a short-term deal. He was injured early on, and only played in seven league matches. After being a free agent for three months he decided to return to the club in February 2013, leaving at the end of the season and returning for a third stint in 2014.

On 16 July 2014, five years later, Karadas returned to Brann.

== International career ==
Karadas made his debut for the Norway national team on 24 January 2001, starting in a 3–2 win over South Korea for that year's Lunar New Year Cup. He returned to the team two years later for a friendly tour of the Middle East, scoring his only goal as a substitute to equalise in a 2–1 win over Oman.

Karadas earned ten caps, over the course of seven years. His final game was a 2–2 exhibition at home to Uruguay, two years after his previous appearance.

== Coaching career ==
After not renewing his playing contract with Brann, Karadas signed a three-year contract on 6 January to serve as an assistant coach for Brann 2 while taking his coaching badges; he had already finished his UEFA B-Licence while finishing his playing career. At the end of December 2019, he declined an offer to take up the role as head coach for newly formed Øygarden FK. After Brann 2 coach Roger Naustan announced he would leave at the end of his contract, Karadas was promoted to head coach from 1 January 2021. In September 2023 he started as assistant coach for Stabæk Fotball. In February 2024 he signed a one-year contract with IK Start. On 24 November 2024, he renewed his contract with three year.

== Career statistics ==
=== Club ===
Club	Season	Division	League		Cup		Total	
Club	Season	Division	Apps	Goals	Apps	Goals	Apps	Goals
Brann	1999	Tippeligaen	6	0	0	0	6	0
Brann	2000	Tippeligaen	21	7	1	0	22	7
Brann	2001	Tippeligaen	23	5	4	3	27	8
Brann	Total		50	12	5	3	55	15
Rosenborg	2002	Tippeligaen	23	5	4	1	27	6
Rosenborg	2003	Tippeligaen	22	5	5	3	27	8
Rosenborg	2004	Tippeligaen	15	3	3	3	18	6
Rosenborg	Total		60	13	12	7	72	20
Benfica	2004–05	Primeira Liga	27	4	0	0	27	4
Portsmouth	2005–06	Premier League	20	1	3	0	23	1
Kaiserslautern	2006–07	2. Bundesliga	11	1	0	0	11	1
Brann	2007	Tippeligaen	8	4	0	0	8	4
Brann	2008	Tippeligaen	21	3	4	0	25	3
Brann	2009	Tippeligaen	19	3	4	3	23	6
Brann	Total		48	10	8	3	56	13
Kasımpaşa	2009–10	Süper Lig	7	1	0	0	7	1
Kasımpaşa	2010–11	Süper Lig	15	0	0	0	15	0
Kasımpaşa	2011–12	TFF First League	14	1	0	0	14	1
Sogndal	2012	Tippeligaen	7	0	0	0	7	0
Sogndal	2013	Tippeligaen	27	4	1	1	28	5
Sogndal	2014	Tippeligaen	10	0	3	1	13	1
Sogndal	Total		44	4	4	2	48	6
Brann	2014	Tippeligaen	10	1	1	0	11	1
Brann	2015	1. divisjon	27	3	3	0	30	3
Brann	2016	Tippeligaen	24	5	1	0	25	5
Brann	2017	Eliteserien	19	0	3	1	22	1
Brann	2018	Eliteserien	14	0	4	1	18	1
Brann	2019	Eliteserien	13	1	2	1	15	2
Brann	Total		107	10	14	3	121	13
Career Total			403	57	46	18	449	75

=== International ===
Norway
Year	Apps	Goals
2001	1	0
2002	0	0
2003	2	1
2004	1	0
2005	4	0
2006	1	0
2007	0	0
2008	1	0
Total	10	1

Azar Karadas: International goals
No.	Date	Venue	Opponent	Score	Result	Competition
1	28 January 2003	Royal Oman Police Stadium, Muscat, Oman	Oman	1–1	2–1	Friendly

== Honours ==
Rosenborg

- Tippeligaen: 2002, 2003, 2004
- Norwegian Football Cup: 2003

Benfica

- Primeira Liga: 2004–05
- Supertaça Cândido de Oliveira: Runner-up 2004

Brann

- Tippeligaen: 2007
