= Torgeir Børven =

Norwegian footballer (born 1991)

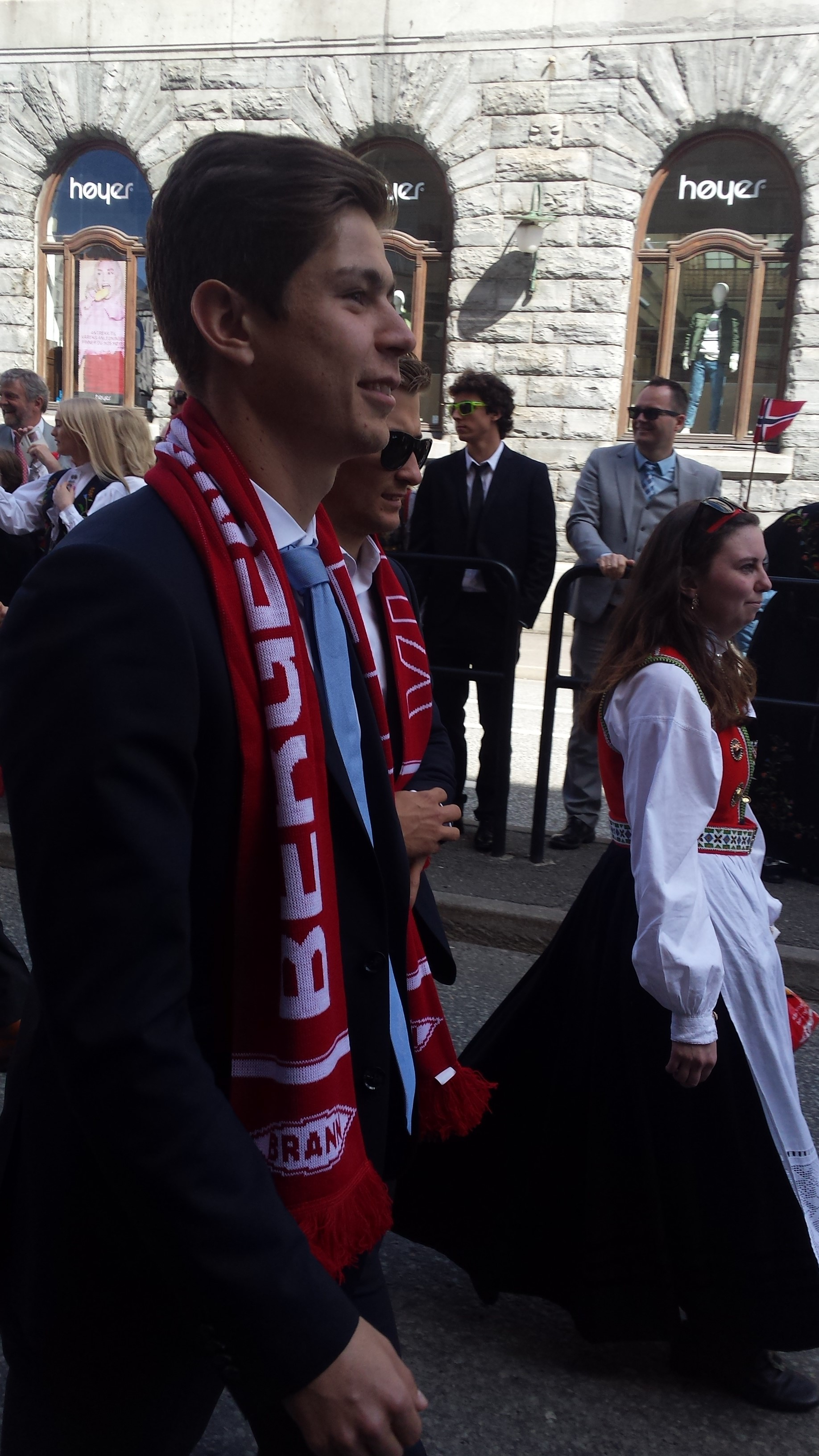
- Børven in 2017

Personal information
- Full name: Torgeir Børven
- Date of birth: 3 December 1991 (age 34)
- Place of birth: Øystese, Norway
- Height: 1.85 m (6 ft 1 in)
- Position: Striker

Team information
- Current team: B36 Tórshavn
- Number: 11

Youth career
- Øystese

Senior career*
| Years | Team | Apps | (Gls) |
| 2009–2012 | Odd | 61 | (24) |
| 2012–2013 | Vålerenga | 39 | (11) |
| 2014–2017 | FC Twente | 39 | (4) |
| 2014–2015 | Jong FC Twente | 4 | (0) |
| 2016 | → Brann (loan) | 4 | (0) |
| 2017–2018 | Brann | 23 | (3) |
| 2018–2020 | Odd | 55 | (32) |
| 2020 | Rosenborg | 14 | (4) |
| 2020–2021 | Ankaragücü | 29 | (10) |
| 2021–2022 | Gaziantep | 15 | (0) |
| 2022–2024 | Vålerenga | 37 | (6) |
| 2024–2025 | Odd | 33 | (8) |
| 2026– | B36 Tórshavn | 12 | (5) |

International career
| 2010–2013 | Norway U21 | 9 | (1) |
| 2012–2015 | Norway U23 | 4 | (0) |
- * Club domestic league appearances and goals as of 2 June 2026

Torgeir Børven (born 3 December 1991) is a Norwegian professional footballer who plays as a striker for The Faroese club B36 Tórshavn. He has previously played for FC Twente, Brann, Vålerenga, Odd and Rosenborg, and has represented his country at under-21 level.

== Club career ==
Børven was born in Øystese, where he also grew up but moved to Skien in 2007 to begin at elite sports high school in Telemark and play for Odd Grenland, which has a partnership with the school. He distinguished himself as a prolific goalscorer, and scored eight goals in one reserve match. Børven got his first-team debut and scored his first goal against Vestfossen in the 2009 Norwegian Football Cup.

Børven made his league debut away to against Brann on 28 September 2009, where he scored one goal and had one assist. In 2010, his first full season as a member of Odd Grenland's first team, he scored eight goals in the Norwegian Premier League, including four goals in Odd's 5–0 win against Sandefjord on 26 September 2010.

Odd Grenland wanted to sell Børven ahead of the 2012 season due to economic difficulties, and made an agreement with Aalesund on a transfer for Børven. Børven however, did not want to move to Aalesund and rejected their offer. After scoring eight goals for Odd Grenland in the 2012 season, Børven signed a 4 1/2-year contract with Vålerenga on 17 August 2012. He scored a total of 24 goals in 63 matches for Odd Grenland in Tippeligaen.

== International career ==
On 17 November 2010, Børven made his debut for the Norway under-21 national team, in a 2–1 win against the Republic of Ireland. He scored his first goal for the U21 team against Azerbaijan on 6 October 2011.

== Career statistics ==
=== Club ===
As of match played 25 October 2025

Appearances and goals by club, season and competition
| Club | Season | League | | | National Cup | | Continental | | Other | | Total | |
| Club | Season | Division | Apps | Goals | Apps | Goals | Apps | Goals | Apps | Goals | Apps | Goals |
|---|---|---|---|---|---|---|---|---|---|---|---|---|
| Odd | 2009 | Tippeligaen | 2 | 1 | 1 | 1 | – | | – | | 3 | 2 |
| Odd | 2010 | Tippeligaen | 21 | 8 | 4 | 2 | – | | – | | 25 | 10 |
| Odd | 2011 | Tippeligaen | 19 | 7 | 0 | 0 | – | | – | | 19 | 7 |
| Odd | 2012 | Tippeligaen | 19 | 8 | 3 | 0 | – | | – | | 22 | 8 |
| Odd | Total | | 61 | 24 | 8 | 3 | – | | – | | 69 | 27 |
| Vålerenga | 2012 | Tippeligaen | 10 | 2 | 0 | 0 | – | | – | | 10 | 2 |
| Vålerenga | 2013 | Tippeligaen | 29 | 9 | 4 | 7 | – | | – | | 33 | 16 |
| Vålerenga | Total | | 39 | 11 | 4 | 7 | – | | – | | 43 | 18 |
| Twente | 2013–14 | Eredivisie | 12 | 3 | 0 | 0 | – | | – | | 12 | 3 |
| Twente | 2014–15 | Eredivisie | 22 | 1 | 0 | 0 | 1 | 0 | – | | 23 | 1 |
| Twente | 2015–16 | Eredivisie | 4 | 0 | 0 | 0 | – | | – | | 4 | 0 |
| Twente | 2016–17 | Eredivisie | 1 | 0 | 0 | 0 | – | | – | | 1 | 0 |
| Twente | Total | | 39 | 4 | 0 | 0 | 1 | 0 | – | | 40 | 4 |
| Brann (loan) | 2016 | Tippeligaen | 4 | 0 | 0 | 0 | – | | – | | 4 | 0 |
| Brann | 2017 | Eliteserien | 23 | 3 | 3 | 1 | – | | 1 | 0 | 27 | 4 |
| Odd | 2018 | Eliteserien | 21 | 5 | 1 | 0 | – | | – | | 22 | 5 |
| Odd | 2019 | Eliteserien | 30 | 21 | 4 | 2 | – | | – | | 34 | 23 |
| Odd | 2020 | Eliteserien | 4 | 6 | 0 | 0 | – | | – | | 4 | 6 |
| Odd | Total | | 55 | 32 | 5 | 2 | – | | – | | 60 | 34 |
| Rosenborg | 2020 | Eliteserien | 14 | 4 | 0 | 0 | 2 | 2 | – | | 16 | 6 |
| Ankaragücü | 2020–21 | Süper Lig | 29 | 10 | 1 | 0 | – | | – | | 30 | 10 |
| Gaziantep | 2021–22 | Süper Lig | 14 | 0 | 2 | 0 | – | | – | | 16 | 0 |
| Gaziantep | 2022–23 | Süper Lig | 1 | 0 | 0 | 0 | – | | – | | 1 | 0 |
| Gaziantep | Total | | 15 | 0 | 0 | 0 | – | | – | | 17 | 0 |
| Vålerenga | 2022 | Eliteserien | 13 | 5 | 0 | 0 | – | | – | | 13 | 5 |
| Vålerenga | 2023 | Eliteserien | 24 | 1 | 6 | 2 | – | | – | | 30 | 3 |
| Vålerenga | Total | | 37 | 6 | 6 | 2 | – | | – | | 43 | 8 |
| Odd | 2024 | Eliteserien | 13 | 2 | 0 | 0 | – | | – | | 13 | 2 |
| Odd | 2025 | OBOS-ligaen | 18 | 6 | 0 | 0 | – | | – | | 18 | 6 |
| Odd | Total | | 31 | 8 | 0 | 0 | – | | – | | 31 | 8 |
| Career total | | | 347 | 102 | 29 | 15 | 3 | 2 | 1 | 0 | 378 | 119 |

== Honours ==
=== Individual ===
- Eliteserien Top goalscorer: 2019
