= Ludcinio Marengo =

Dutch footballer (born 1991)

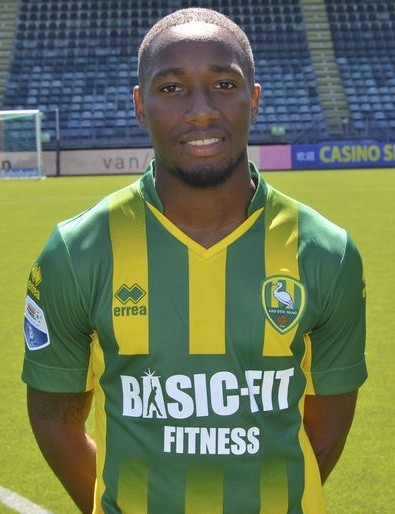

Personal information
- Full name: Ludcinio Sergio Marengo
- Date of birth: 14 September 1991 (age 35)
- Place of birth: Amsterdam, Netherlands
- Height: 1.75 m (5 ft 9 in)
- Position: Winger

Youth career
- FC Volendam

Senior career*
Years	Team	Apps	(Gls)
2012–2015	FC Volendam	106	(20)
2015–2017	ADO Den Haag	35	(1)
2017	→ Go Ahead Eagles (loan)	6	(0)
2017–2019	Brann	24	(3)
2020	Tsarsko Selo	4	(0)
- * Club domestic league appearances and goals as of 1 June 2020

Ludcinio Marengo (born 14 September 1991) is a Dutch professional footballer who plays as a winger. Besides the Netherlands, he has played in Norway and Bulgaria.

He formerly played for FC Volendam, ADO Den Haag, Go Ahead Eagles, Brann and Tsarsko Selo Sofia.

== Personal life ==
Born in the Netherlands, Marengo is of Surinamese descent.
