= Markus Olsen Pettersen =

Norwegian football player (born 1999)

Personal information
- Full name: Markus Olsen Pettersen
- Date of birth: 12 February 1999 (age 27)
- Place of birth: Askøy Municipality, Norway
- Height: 1.89 m (6 ft 2 in)
- Position: Goalkeeper

Team information
- Current team: KÍ
- Number: 1

Youth career
- 2009–2013: Askøy
- 2013–2015: Brann

Senior career*
Years	Team	Apps	(Gls)
2016–2023	Brann	12	(0)
2019	→ Nest-Sotra (loan)	0	(0)
2023–	KÍ	16	(0)

International career^{‡}
2014	Norway U-15	1	(0)
2015–2016	Norway U-16	9	(0)
2016	Norway U-17	1	(0)
2018–	Norway U-19	9	(0)
- * Club domestic league appearances and goals as of 10 November 2023 ‡ National team caps and goals as of 22 January 2019

Markus Olsen Pettersen (born 12 February 1999) is a Norwegian footballer who plays as a goalkeeper for KÍ.

== Career ==
On 14 January 2019, Nest-Sotra signed Pettersen from SK Brann on a season-long loan deal.
