= Lars Arne Nilsen =

Norwegian football coach (born 1964)

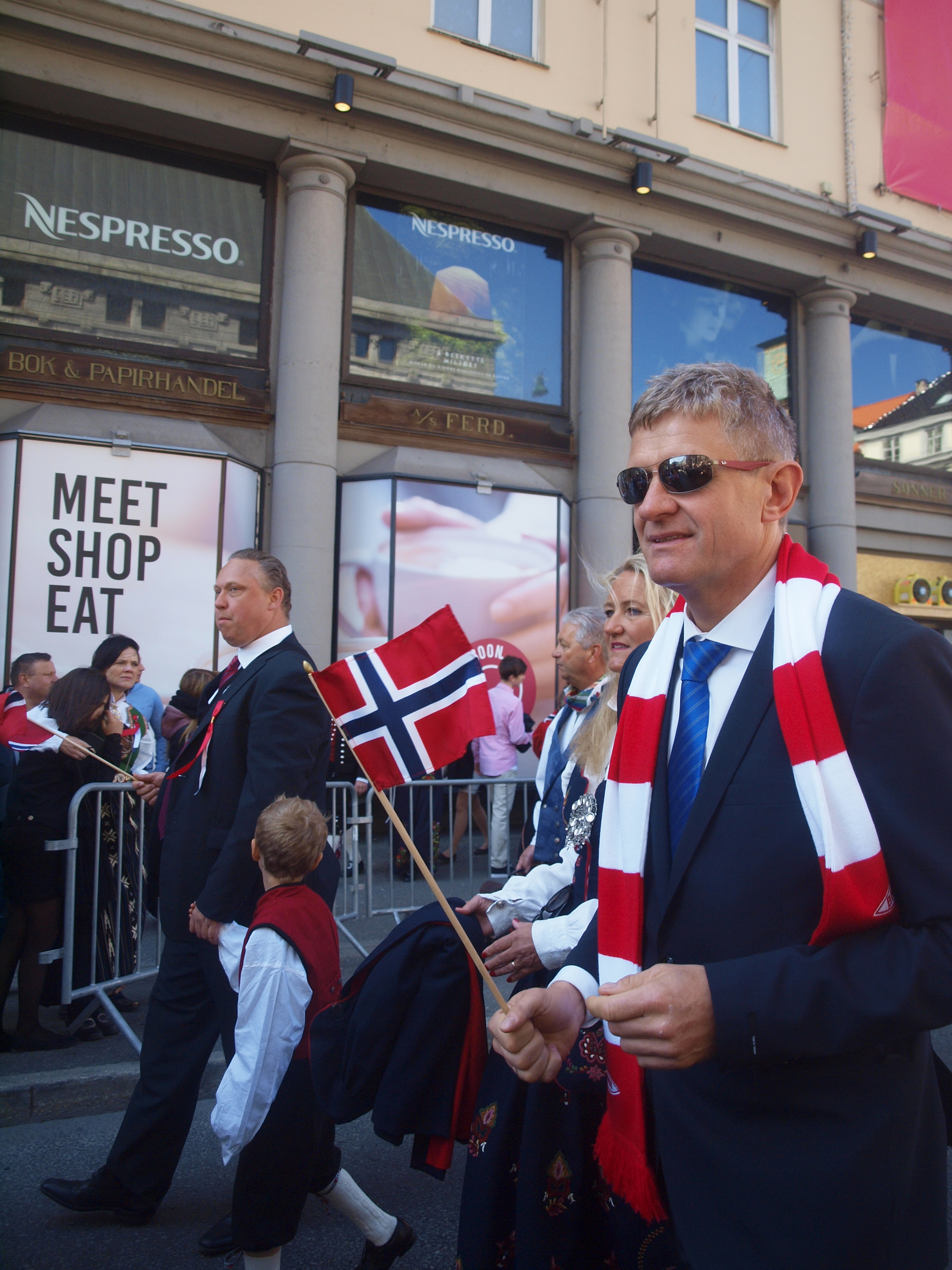
- Nilsen in 2018

Personal information
- Date of birth: 6 April 1964 (age 62)
- Place of birth: Fjell, Norway

Senior career*
Years	Team	Apps	(Gls)
–1998	Stord		
1989–1990	Sogndal		
1991–1994	Nest-Sotra		
1995	Volda		

Managerial career
- Ørsta
- Volda
- 2008–2009: Hødd (assistant)
- 2010–2013: Hødd
- 2015–2020: SK Brann
- 2020–2023: Aalesund
- 2023: 07 Vestur
- * Club domestic league appearances and goals

Lars Arne Nilsen (born 6 April 1964) is a Norwegian football coach who last managed 07 Vestur.

== Career ==
Nilsen is from Sotra in Fjell Municipality. He played for Stord Sunnhordland FK as a young player and was the club's top scorer in 1988, the year he scored the 1–0 goal in the promotion battle to the top division against Os TF. He played for Sogndal from 1989 to 1990, Nest-Sotra from 1991 to 1994 and Volda from 1995 where he also coached. In 1999, he was coach of the Ørsta IL. From 2008, he was assistant coach for IL Hødd, under Einar Magne Skeide. Nilsen was promoted to head coach ahead of the 2010 season and led the team to victory in the 2012 Norwegian Football Cup, in a season where the team was in the second tier and barely saved from relegation. He resigned from his position in November 2013.

After Nilsen took over as head coach of SK Brann in 2015, he led the team to 2nd place and direct promotion from 1. divisjon. In 2016, he secured 2nd place and silver medal in Brann's first season back in Tippeligaen, and was also chosen as the coach of the year in Tippeligaen. After two years of poor results he was sacked in August 2020. After a 3 year spell with Aalesunds FK, Nilsen was hired by Faroe Islands Premier League side 07 Vestur following the departure of Michael Schjønberg.

== Personal life ==
Nilsen is the brother of former Vålerenga player, Nest-Sotra and Brann II coach Helge Nilsen, and the father of footballer Sivert Heltne Nilsen who also played in Hødd under his father's management, but as in 2013 went on to play for Vålerenga. In 2015, he went to SK Brann, again under his father's management.

== Honours ==
=== Manager ===
Hødd

- Norwegian Cup: 2012

Individual

- Tippeligaen Coach of the Year: 2016
- Norwegian First Division Coach of the Month: September 2021
