= Kristoffer Barmen =

Norwegian footballer (born 1993)

Personal information
- Full name: Kristoffer Ramos Barmen
- Date of birth: 19 August 1993 (age 33)
- Place of birth: Bergen, Norway
- Height: 1.90 m (6 ft 3 in)
- Position: Midfielder

Team information
- Current team: Åsane
- Number: 10

Youth career
- Brann

Senior career*
Years	Team	Apps	(Gls)
2011–2021	Brann	225	(30)
2021–2023	Aalesund	51	(7)
2023	→ Åsane (loan)	8	(2)
2024–	Åsane	77	(14)

International career
2011	Norway U18	1	(0)
2013–2014	Norway U23	2	(1)
- * Club domestic league appearances and goals as of 14 November 2026

Kristoffer Ramos Barmen (born 19 August 1993) is a Norwegian professional footballer who plays as a midfielder for Åsane.

== Club career ==
Barmen joined Brann at the age of 10, and was sacked by the club in August 2021 after he was highlighted as playing a "key role" in the organisation of a large sex party at Brann's stadium. Later that month he signed for Aalesund.

On 30 August 2023, Åsane announced that they had made a loan-deal with Barmen for the rest of 2023-season. The move was made permanent in January 2024.

== International career ==
He represented Norway U19 in the 2012 UEFA European Under-19 Football Championship qualification.

== Coaching career ==
In 2020, Barmen started head coaching seventh-tier amateur team Paradis IL.

== Personal life ==
Barmen is the son of Rolf Barmen, former chairman of SK Brann. He has also won the junior championship for quiz in Bergen.

== Career statistics ==
As of match played 13 September 2025

Appearances and goals by club, season and competition
Club	Season	League			Cup		Total	
Club	Season	Division	Apps	Goals	Apps	Goals	Apps	Goals
Brann	2011	Eliteserien	2	0	0	0	2	0
Brann	2012	Eliteserien	18	2	2	1	20	3
Brann	2013	Eliteserien	22	3	2	3	24	6
Brann	2014	Eliteserien	25	1	5	1	30	2
Brann	2015	1. divisjon	23	4	3	0	26	4
Brann	2016	Eliteserien	25	5	1	0	26	5
Brann	2017	Eliteserien	24	8	3	0	27	8
Brann	2018	Eliteserien	23	3	1	0	24	3
Brann	2019	Eliteserien	25	1	3	0	28	1
Brann	2020	Eliteserien	26	3	0	0	26	3
Brann	2021	Eliteserien	12	0	2	0	14	0
Brann	Total		225	30	22	5	247	35
Aalesund	2021	1. divisjon	11	5	1	0	12	5
Aalesund	2022	Eliteserien	26	2	2	0	28	2
Aalesund	2023	Eliteserien	13	0	2	0	15	0
Aalesund	Total		50	7	5	0	55	7
Åsane (loan)	2023	1. divisjon	8	2	0	0	8	2
Åsane	2024	1. divisjon	25	5	0	0	25	5
Åsane	2025	1. divisjon	20	6	4	3	24	9
Åsane	Total		45	11	4	3	49	14
Career total			328	50	31	8	359	58
