= Jonas Grønner =

Norwegian footballer (born 1994)

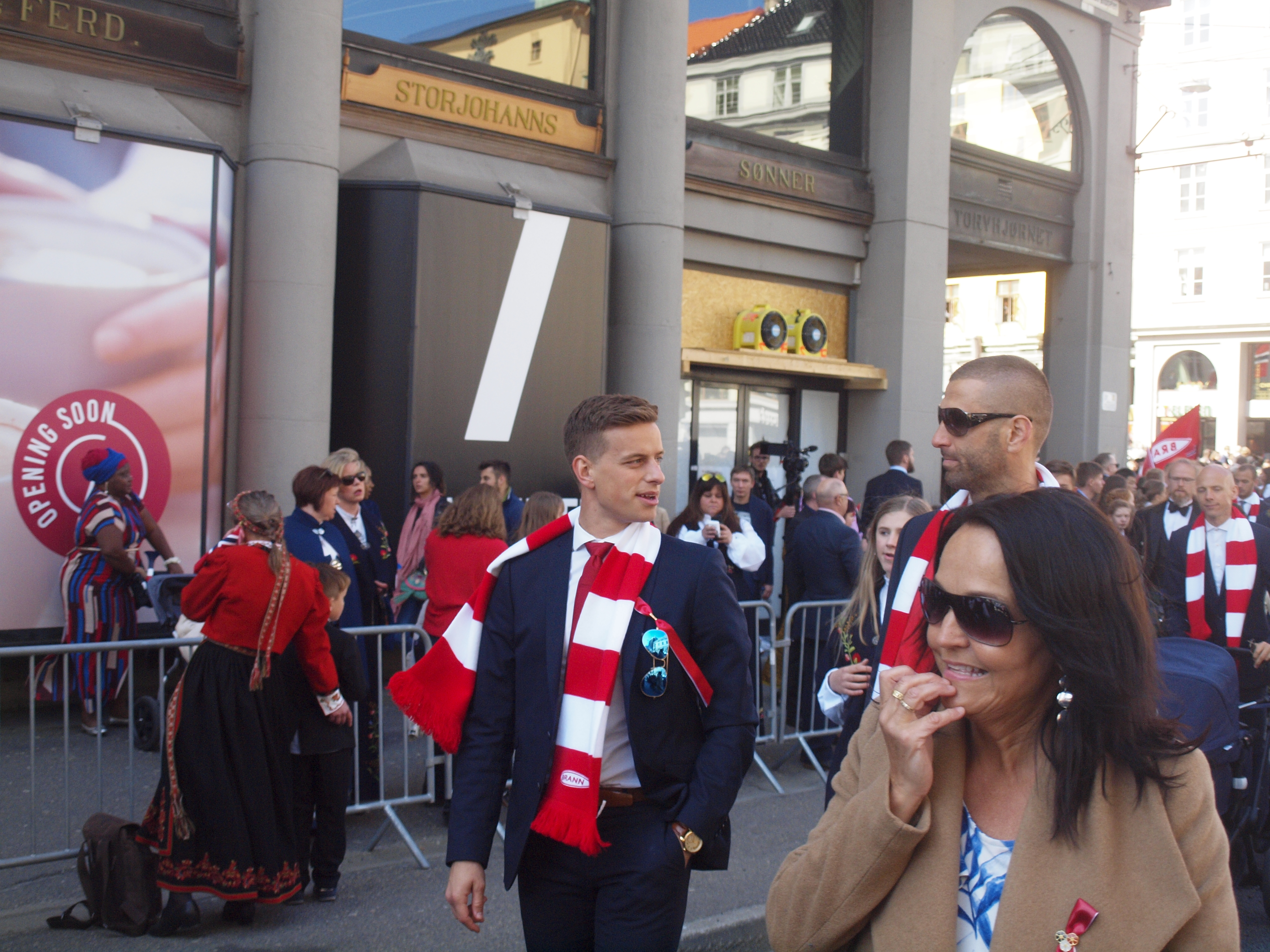

Personal information
- Date of birth: 11 April 1994 (age 32)
- Place of birth: Bergen, Norway
- Position: Defender

Senior career*
Years	Team	Apps	(Gls)
2011–2018	Brann	77	(7)
2013	→ KR (loan)	9	(0)
2018–2021	Aalesund	72	(0)
2022	Langevåg	2	(0)

International career
2010	Norway U16	8	(1)
2011	Norway U17	5	(0)
2012	Norway U18	11	(2)
2013	Norway U19	6	(0)
2014–2016	Norway U21	22	(1)
- * Club domestic league appearances and goals as of 11:56, 27 August 2023 (UTC)

Jonas Grønner (born 11 April 1994) is a Norwegian former professional footballer who played as a defender.

== Career statistics ==
As of 15 May 2021

Club	Season	Division	League		Cup		Total	
Club	Season	Division	Apps	Goals	Apps	Goals	Apps	Goals
Brann	2012	Tippeligaen	5	0	2	0	7	0
Brann	2013	Tippeligaen	5	0	2	0	7	0
Brann	Total		10	0	4	0	14	0
KR	2013	Úrvalsdeild	9	0	1	0	10	0
Brann	2014	Tippeligaen	23	3	4	0	27	3
Brann	2015	1. divisjon	19	2	3	0	22	2
Brann	2016	Tippeligaen	15	0	1	0	16	0
Brann	2017	Eliteserien	10	2	2	1	12	3
Brann	2018	Eliteserien	0	0	4	1	4	1
Brann	Total		67	7	14	2	81	9
Aalesund	2018	1. divisjon	14	0	0	0	14	0
Aalesund	2019	1. divisjon	23	0	4	0	27	0
Aalesund	2020	Eliteserien	26	0	–		26	0
Aalesund	2021	1. divisjon	9	0	1	1	10	1
Aalesund	Total		72	0	5	1	77	1
Career total			150	7	23	2	173	9
