= Daniel Braaten =

Norwegian footballer (born 1982)

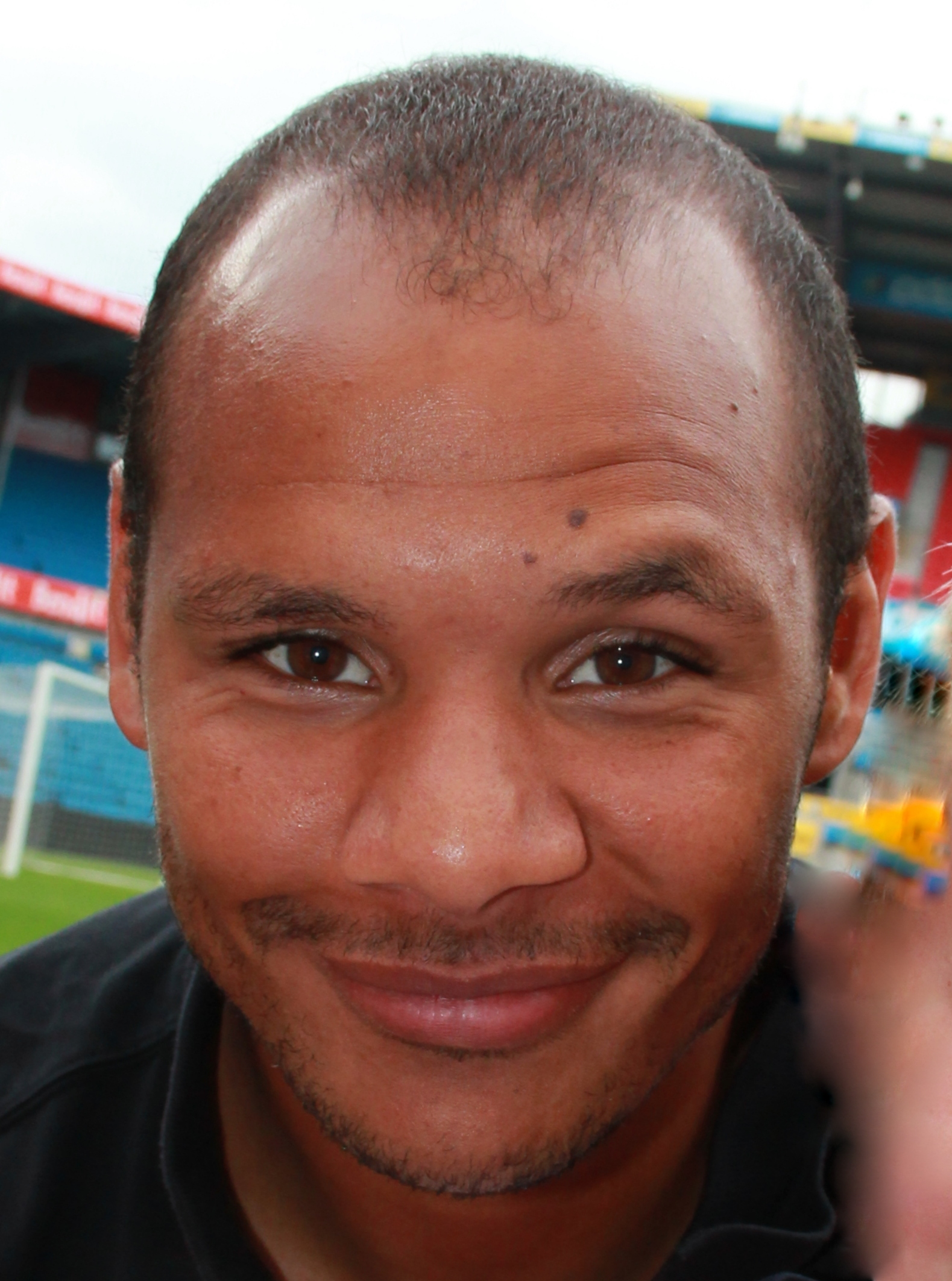
- Braaten in 2012

Personal information
- Full name: Daniel Omoya Braaten
- Date of birth: 25 May 1982 (age 44)
- Place of birth: Oslo, Norway
- Height: 1.84 m (6 ft 0 in)
- Position: Winger

Youth career
- 1988–2000: Skeid

Senior career*
Years	Team	Apps	(Gls)
2000–2004	Skeid	102	(22)
2004–2007	Rosenborg	58	(10)
2007–2008	Bolton Wanderers	6	(1)
2008–2013	Toulouse	157	(13)
2013–2014	Copenhagen	23	(1)
2015–2016	Vålerenga	22	(1)
2016–2018	Brann	51	(3)
2019	Stabæk	18	(2)
2020	Skeid	18	(1)
Total		455	(54)

International career
2000	Norway U18	4	(0)
2003	Norway U21	2	(0)
2004–2014	Norway	52	(4)
- * Club domestic league appearances and goals as of 20 August 2021

Daniel Omoya Braaten (born 25 May 1982) is a Norwegian former professional footballer who played as a winger. He has previously played for Skeid, Rosenborg, Bolton Wanderers, Toulouse, Brann and Stabæk. Of Nigerian descent, he was capped 52 times for the Norway national team, scoring 4 goals.

== Club career ==
=== Early career ===
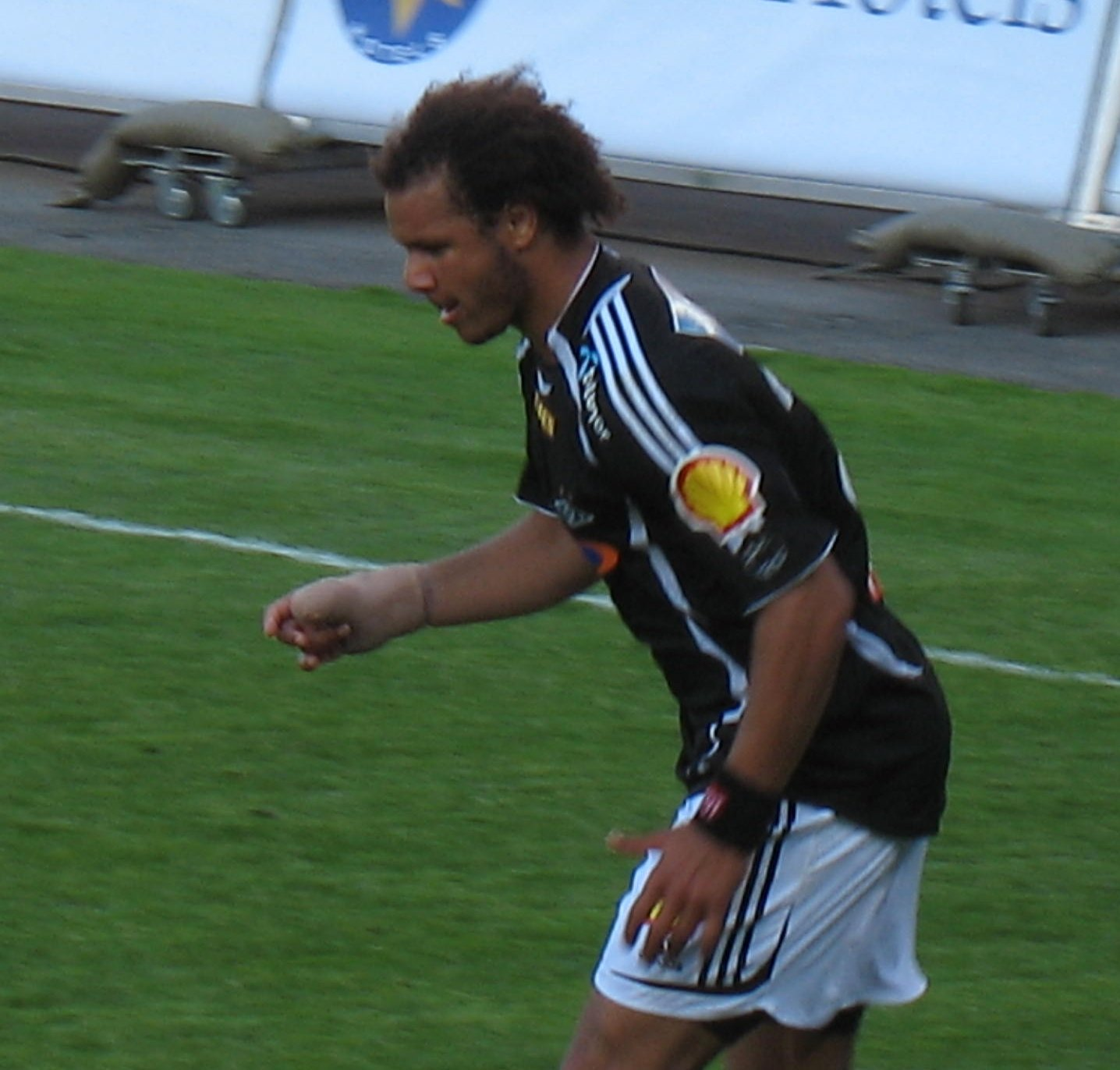
Braaten playing for Rosenborg

Braaten was born in Oslo, Norway. He started his career in the Skeid youth academy at the age of six. He later won the Norwegian Junior Cup with the team in 1999, aged 17. The following year he was promoted to the first team, where he played for four years before joining giants Rosenborg BK in 2004, after 102 caps and 22 goals for Skeid. Before signing for Rosenborg, Braaten had attracted interest from various clubs in Norway and abroad, and had a trial with French side RC Lens in late 2003 with Daniel Fredheim Holm. Braaten had however trained with Rosenborg as early as autumn 2002, but was still in contract with Skeid, before signing in 2004 for approximately £250,000.

Braaten had become one of the most profiled players of the Norwegian Premier League, through his playing style. He had become known especially for his individual technical skills and physical strength, and as a player who did unexpected things on the field, surprising both opposing players and the audience. He was famous not only for his pace, but also for his mastery of the seal dribble, and showing a difficult trick involving running while bouncing (and controlling) the ball on top of the head.

=== European career ===
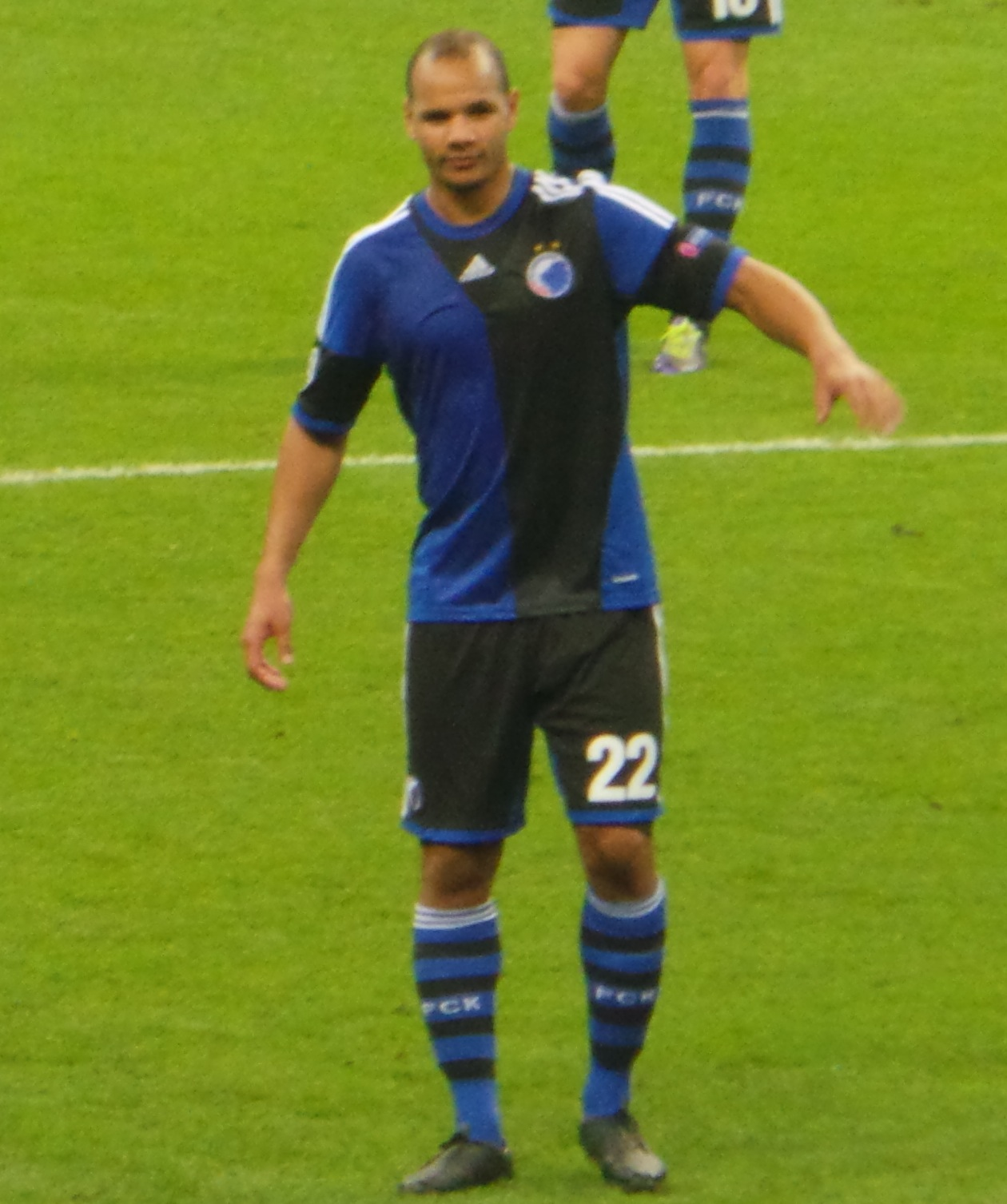
Braaten playing for Copenhagen in 2013

On 3 August 2007, Braaten signed for Bolton Wanderers for a reported fee of £450,000. He scored his first goal in English football just over three weeks later, netting the final goal in Bolton's 3–0 win over Reading. He failed to secure a permanent spot on the team, however, and after a tough season in England, Braaten signed a three-year contract with French side Toulouse on 25 June 2008. He was included as part of the deal which saw Johan Elmander move to Bolton. He scored his first league goal in Toulouse's 4–1 victory over Paris Saint-Germain. He performed a unique celebration by spinning on his back while spinning upwards at the same time after scoring his first goal for the club. He was released from his contract in July 2013.

Two months later, in September, Braaten signed a one-year-long deal with Danish side Copenhagen, where he was given shirt no. 22. During his time in the Danish capital, he scored one goal in the league and a back-heel goal in the UEFA Champions League to secure a 1–0 victory over Galatasaray. At the end of the season Braaten left Copenhagen without a new contract and returned to Norway.

=== Return to Norway ===
On 9 February 2015, Braaten signed a one-year deal with Kjetil Rekdal and Vålerenga in the Norwegian Tippeliga after almost eight months as a free agent. He scored his first, and only, goal for his new club away versus Sandefjord on his birthday, 25 May. On 3 December 2015, it was announced that his contract would not be renewed, something that surprised many critics as he had performed well in the previous season. After training with SK Brann during the winter, he signed a one-year contract with the club on 21 February 2016, his fourth club in just as many years. After 55 games for Brann, he left the club at the end of the 2018 season.

== International career ==
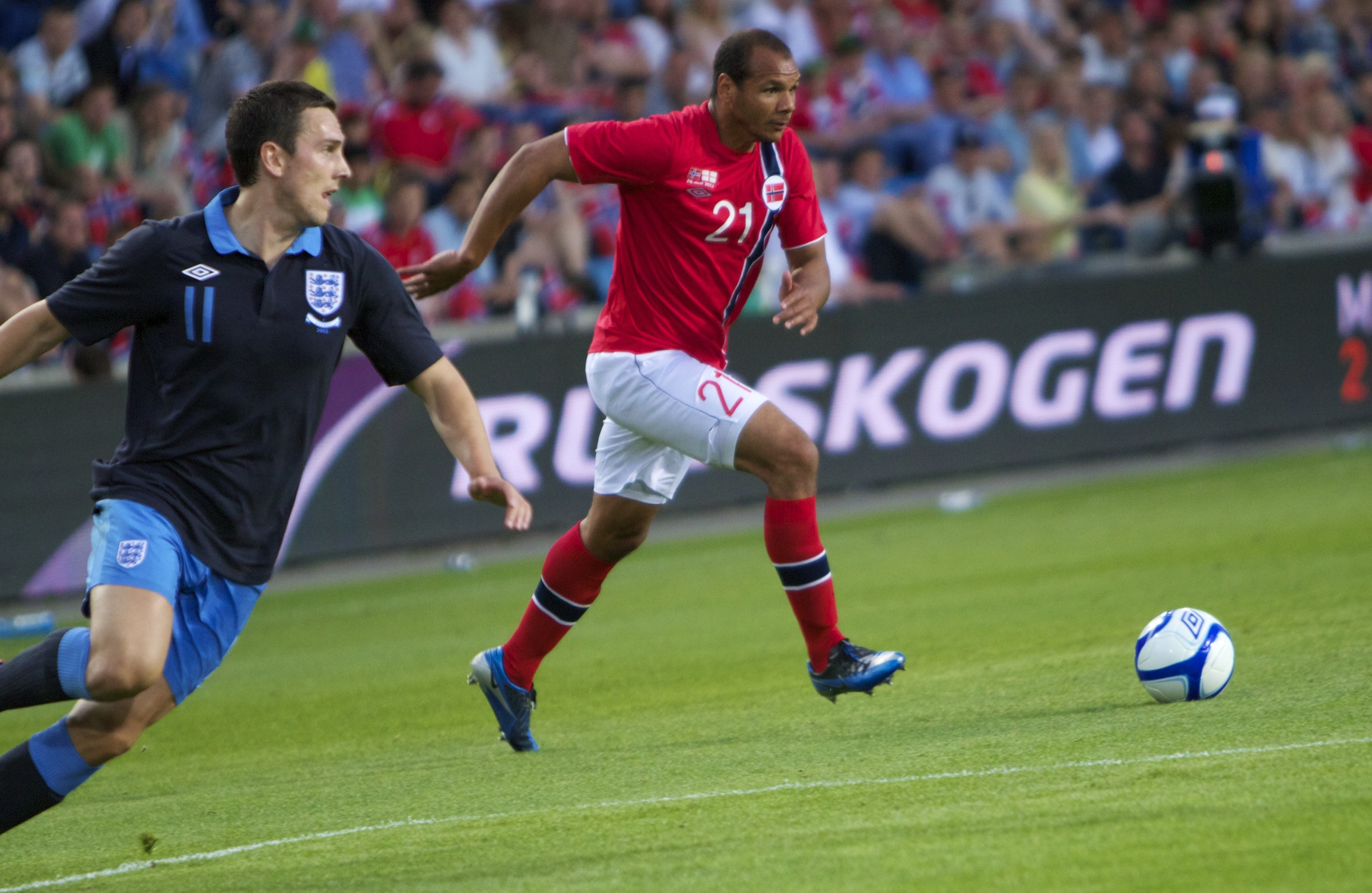
Braaten (right) playing for Norway in 2012

After playing four matches for Norway U18 in 2000, and two matches for Norway U21 in 2003, Braaten made his debut for Norway on 22 January 2004 in a friendly match against Sweden, when playing for Skeid in Adeccoligaen, the second-tier league in Norway. His first international goal came against Estonia, in a Friendly match on 20 April 2005, a game Norway won 2–1. As of May 2018, he has been capped 52 times for Norway, scoring four goals.

== Career statistics ==
=== Club ===
As of match played 12 December 2020

Appearances and goals by club, season and competition
Club	Season	Division	League		Cup		Europe		Other		Total	
Club	Season	Division	Apps	Goals	Apps	Goals	Apps	Goals	Apps	Goals	Apps	Goals
Skeid	2000	1. divisjon	13	0	1	0	—		—		14	0
Skeid	2001	1. divisjon	28	3	3	0	—		—		31	3
Skeid	2002	1. divisjon	25	4	4	1	—		—		29	5
Skeid	2003	1. divisjon	22	6	5	1	—		—		27	7
Skeid	2004	1. divisjon	14	9	3	0	—		—		17	9
Skeid	Total		102	22	16	2	—		—		110	24
Rosenborg	2004	Tippeligaen	10	4	1	0	8	1	—		19	5
Rosenborg	2005	Tippeligaen	14	1	0	0	8	1	—		22	2
Rosenborg	2006	Tippeligaen	19	3	4	0	2	0	—		25	3
Rosenborg	2007	Tippeligaen	15	2	4	0	0	0	—		19	2
Rosenborg	Total		58	10	9	0	18	2	—		85	12
Bolton	2007–08	Premier League	6	1	3	0	5	0	0	0	14	1
Toulouse	2008–09	Ligue 1	30	1	5	1	0	0	0	0	35	2
Toulouse	2009–10	Ligue 1	32	4	5	0	7	1	0	0	44	5
Toulouse	2010–11	Ligue 1	32	5	1	0	0	0	0	0	33	5
Toulouse	2011–12	Ligue 1	31	1	1	0	0	0	0	0	32	1
Toulouse	2012–13	Ligue 1	32	2	0	0	0	0	0	0	32	2
Toulouse	Total		157	13	12	1	7	1	0	0	176	15
Copenhagen	2013–14	Superliga	23	1	0	0	4	1	0	0	27	2
Vålerenga	2015	Tippeligaen	22	1	2	0	—		—		24	1
Brann	2016	Tippeligaen	25	0	0	0	—		—		25	0
Brann	2017	Eliteserien	15	3	1	0	—		1	0	17	3
Brann	2018	Eliteserien	11	0	4	1	0	0	0	0	15	1
Brann	Total		51	3	5	1	0	0	1	0	57	4
Stabæk	2019	Eliteserien	18	2	4	1	—		—		22	3
Skeid	2020	PostNord-ligaen	18	1	0	0	—		—		18	1
Career total			455	54	51	5	34	4	1	0	541	63

=== International ===
Appearances and goals by national team and year
National team	Year	Apps	Goals
Norway	2004	2	0
Norway	2005	5	1
Norway	2006	4	0
Norway	2007	4	1
Norway	2008	2	0
Norway	2009	8	0
Norway	2010	2	0
Norway	2011	6	0
Norway	2012	9	0
Norway	2013	8	2
Norway	2014	2	0
Total		52	4

Scores and results list Norway's goal tally first, score column indicates score after each Braaten goal

List of international goals scored by Daniel Braaten
No.	Date	Venue	Opponent	Score	Result	Competition
1	20 April 2005	A. Le Coq Arena, Tallinn, Estonia	Estonia	1–0	2–1	Friendly
2	6 June 2007	Ullevaal Stadion, Oslo, Norway	Hungary	2–0	4–0	UEFA Euro 2008 qualifying
3	11 June 2013	Ullevaal Stadion, Oslo, Norway	North Macedonia	2–0	2–0	Friendly
4	15 October 2013	Ullevaal Stadion, Oslo, Norway	Iceland	1–1	1–1	2014 FIFA World Cup qualification

== Honours ==
Rosenborg

- Tippeligaen: 2004, 2006
