= 2021 SK Brann season =

Brann
2021 season
- President: Eivind Lunde
- Manager: Lars Arne Nilsen (until 26 June); Kåre Ingebrigtsen (from 8 August)
- Stadium: Brann Stadion
- Eliteserien: 14th Relegation play-offs
- Norwegian Cup: Fourth Round
- Top goalscorer: League: Aune Heggebø (8); All: Aune Heggebø (11)
Home colours	Away colours

The 2021 season was Brann's sixth season back in Eliteserien since their relegation at the end of the 2014 season.

== Players and staff ==
=== Current squad ===
As of 8 August 2021

Note: Flags indicate national team as defined under FIFA eligibility rules; some limited exceptions apply. Players may hold more than one non-FIFA nationality.

No.	Pos.	Nation	Player
1	GK	NOR	Håkon Opdal
2	DF	NOR	Ole Didrik Blomberg
4	DF	NOR	Ole Martin Kolskogen
5	DF	NOR	Thomas Grøgaard
6	DF	LUX	Lars Krogh Gerson
7	FW	NOR	Mathias Rasmussen
8	MF	NOR	Felix Horn Myhre
9	MF	NOR	Petter Strand
11	FW	NOR	Bård Finne
12	GK	NOR	Eirik Johansen
14	MF	SWE	Moonga Simba
15	MF	NOR	Kasper Skaanes
16	MF	FIN	Robert Taylor

No.	Pos.	Nation	Player
17	FW	NOR	Filip Delaveris
18	DF	NOR	David Møller Wolfe
19	MF	NOR	Sivert Heltne Nilsen
20	FW	NOR	Aune Heggebø
21	DF	NOR	Ruben Kristiansen
22	DF	SEN	Vieux Sané
23	MF	DEN	Daniel A. Pedersen
24	GK	NOR	Markus Olsen Pettersen
25	MF	NOR	Niklas Jensen Wassberg
26	DF	DEN	Japhet Sery Larsen
27	GK	DEN	Mikkel Andersen
29	MF	NOR	Kristoffer Barmen
—	DF	NOR	Fredrik Pallesen Knudsen

For season transfers, see transfers winter 2020–21 and transfers summer 2021.

=== Out on loan ===
Note: Flags indicate national team as defined under FIFA eligibility rules; some limited exceptions apply. Players may hold more than one non-FIFA nationality.

No.	Pos.	Nation	Player
22	DF	NOR	Vegard Strønen Skeie (on loan at Øygarden FK until 31 December 2021)
14	FW	NOR	Erlend Hustad (on loan at Sandnes Ulf until 31 December 2021)

=== First team staff ===
As of 16 May 2021

Head coach:
Assistant coach: Eirik Horneland
Goalkeeper coach: Dan Riisnes
Fitness coach: Manuel Pericás Torres
First team player developer: Helge Haugen
Physician: Arne Instebø
Physician: Magnus Myntevik
Physio: David Tovi
Physio: Gregor Monsen
Physio: Tore Eland
Massage therapist: Bjørn Rune Skråmestø
Equipment manager: Raymond Sanden

=== Administrative staff ===
Chairman: Birger Grevstad Jr
CEO: Vibeke Johannesen
Director of football: Jimmi Nagel Jacobsen
Chief scout: Per Ove Ludvigsen

== Friendlies ==
4 February 2021 Friendly	Molde	2–1	Brann	Molde
14:00 CET		Report		Stadium: Aker Stadion

19 February 2021 Friendly	Brann	2–0	Bodø/Glimt	Bergen
11:30 CET		Report		Stadium: Vestlandshallen

17 April 2021 Friendly	Sogndal	4–1	Brann	Sogndalsfjøra
15:00 CET		Report		Stadium: Fosshaugane Campus

25 April 2021 Friendly	Bodø/Glimt	4–1	Brann	Bodø
11:00 CET		Report		Stadium: Aspmyra Stadion

28 April 2021 Friendly	Brann	3–3	Sandnes Ulf	Bergen
16:00 CET		Report		Stadium: Myrdal Stadion

2 May 2021 Friendly	Åsane	1–2	Brann	Bergen
16:00 CET		Report		Stadium: Myrdal Stadion

7 June 2021 Friendly	Brann	3–0	Øygarden	Bergen
16:00 CET		Report		Stadium: Brann Stadion

== Competitions ==
=== Eliteserien ===
==== Results summary ====
Overall								Home						Away					
Pld	W	D	L	GF	GA	GD	Pts	W	D	L	GF	GA	GD	W	D	L	GF	GA	GD
30	5	11	14	38	55	−17	26	4	5	6	20	24	−4	1	6	8	18	31	−13

Last updated: 12 December 2021.
Source: Results

==== Results by round ====
Round	1	2	3	4	5	6	7	8	9	10	11	12	13	14	15	16	17	18	19	20	21	22	23	24	25	26	27	28	29	30
Ground	A	H	A	A	H	A	H	A	H	A	H	A	H	H	H	A	H	A	H	A	A	H	A	H	A	H	A	H	A	H
Result	L	L	L	L	L	L	W	D	L	L	D	L	D	D	W	L	L	W	D	W	D	D	D	L	L	D	D	L	D	W
Position	13	16	16	16	16	16	16	16	16	16	16	16	16	16	16	16	16	15	15	14	14	14	14	14	15	14	16	16	15	14

Source: Results
A = Away; H = Home; W = Win; D = Draw; L = Loss

==== Results ====
9 May 2021 1	Viking	3–1	Brann	Stavanger
18:00 CEST	Friðjónsson 19'; Løkberg (yellow card) 45'; Berisha 66'; Blomberg 81' (o.g.)	Report	Bamba 42'; Barmen (yellow card) 60'; Forren (yellow card) 81'	Stadium: SR-Bank Arena; Attendance: 600; Referee: Espen Eskås

12 May 2021 2	Brann	0–3	Vålerenga	Bergen
20:00 CEST		Report	Christensen (yellow card) 45'; Sahraoui 65'; Borchgrevink (yellow card) 84'; Dønnum 89', 90+1'	Stadium: Brann Stadion; Attendance: 600; Referee: Dag Vidar Hafsås

16 May 2021 3	Molde	4–0	Brann	Molde
20:00 CEST	Omoijuanfo 29', 42', 53' (yellow card) 53'; Aursnes 38' (yellow card) 83'	Report		Stadium: Aker Stadion; Attendance: 600; Referee: Tore Hansen

20 May 2021 14	Rosenborg	3–2	Brann	Trondheim
20:30 CEST	Zachariassen 11', 84', 90+1' (yellow card) 42'	Report	Kristiansen 49' (yellow card) 90'; Taylor 54'; Simba (yellow card) 63'; Forren (yellow card) 75'	Stadium: Lerkendal Stadion; Attendance: 600; Referee: Tom Harald Hagen

24 May 2021 4	Brann	1–2	Bodø/Glimt	Bergen
18:00 CEST	Bamba 80'	Report	Berg 67'; Botheim 86' (yellow card) 87'	Stadium: Brann Stadion; Attendance: 600; Referee: Sigurd Smehus Kringstad

27 May 2021 5	Stabæk	2–0	Brann	Bærum
18:00 CEST	Solheim (yellow card) 14'; Skytte 21' (pen.); Geelmuyden (yellow card) 56'; Amankwah 64'	Report	Kristiansen (yellow card) 31'; Rasmussen (yellow card) 50'; Blomberg (yellow card) 63'; Skaanes (yellow card) 82'	Stadium: Nadderud Stadion; Attendance: 600; Referee: Marius Hansen Grøtta

30 May 2021 6	Brann	3–0	Strømsgodset	Bergen
18:00 CEST	Heggebø 14'; Strand (yellow card) 23'; Valsvik 29' (o.g.); Rasmussen (yellow card) 42'; Simba 85'	Report		Stadium: Brann Stadion; Attendance: 600; Referee: Svein Oddvar Moen

13 June 2021 7	Sarpsborg 08	0–0	Brann	Sarpsborg
18:00 CEST		Report	Skaanes (yellow card) 37'; Bamba (yellow card) 76'	Stadium: Sarpsborg Stadion; Attendance: 600; Referee: Espen Eskås

20 June 2021 8	Brann	1–3	Odd	Bergen
18:00 CEST	Tveita 81'; Kolskogen (yellow card) 88'	Report	Bakenga 49' (pen.), 72', 88'; Kitolano (yellow card) 86'	Stadium: Brann Stadion; Attendance: 600; Referee: Tom Harald Hagen

24 June 2021 9	Haugesund	1–0	Brann	Haugesund
18:00 CEST	Wadji 74'	Report	Heggebø (yellow card) 40'	Stadium: Haugesund Stadion; Attendance: 600; Referee: Mohammad Aslam

30 June 2021 10	Brann	1–1	Lillestrøm	Bergen
20:00 CEST	Bamba 58'	Report	Ranger (yellow card) 68'; Olsen 87'	Stadium: Brann Stadion; Attendance: 600; Referee: Svein Oddvar Moen

5 July 2021 11	Kristiansund	3–2	Brann	Kristiansund
19:00 CEST	Muçolli 57' (yellow card) 66'; Gjertsen 60'; Skarsem (yellow card) 71'; Hopmark 76'	Report	Rasmussen 9'; Strand (yellow card) 54'; Bamba 68'	Stadium: Kristiansund Stadion; Attendance: 1,905; Referee: Espen Eskås

10 July 2021 12	Brann	1–1	Tromsø	Bergen
20:00 CEST	Rasmussen (yellow card) 39'; Bamba 45+1' (yellow card) 85'; Sané (yellow card) 90+9'	Report	Antonsen 18' (yellow card) 90+1'; Totland (yellow card) 79'; Karlstrøm (yellow card) 82'	Stadium: Brann Stadion; Attendance: 3,645; Referee: Mohammad Aslam

18 July 2021 13	Brann	1–1	Mjøndalen	Bergen
18:00 CEST	Bamba 90+6'	Report	Larsen (yellow card) 80'; Sell (yellow card) 85'; Walstad 90+2'	Stadium: Brann Stadion; Attendance: 3,986; Referee: Tore Hansen

15 August 2021 15	Brann	3–2	Sandefjord	Bergen
20:00 CEST	Pedersen 18'; Nilsen (yellow card) 28'; Heggebø 49'; Taylor 78' (pen.); Knudsen (yellow card) 89'	Report	Hansen 29', 42'; Singh (yellow card) 49'	Stadium: Brann Stadion; Attendance: 4,512; Referee: Rohit Saggi

21 August 2021 16	Strømsgodset	3–1	Brann	Drammen
20:00 CEST	Stengel 60'; Valsvik 74'; Gulliksen 86'	Report	Heggebø 23'; Knudsen (yellow card) 90+1'	Stadium: Marienlyst Stadion; Attendance: 2,000; Referee: Svein Oddvar Moen

28 August 2021 17	Brann	1–3	Haugesund	Bergen
20:00 CEST	Myhre (yellow card) 37'; Heggebø 69'; Taylor (penalty missed) 76'	Report	Liseth 28'; Velde 30' (yellow card) 80'; Ndour 81'	Stadium: Brann Stadion; Attendance: 3,466; Referee: Espen Eskås

11 September 2021 18	Lillestrøm	2–3	Brann	Lillestrøm
18:00 CEST	Garnås (yellow card) 39' (goal) 59'; Lehne Olsen 71'	Report	Taylor 17'; Knudsen (yellow card) 35'; Finne 65'; Heggebø 74'	Stadium: Åråsen Stadion; Attendance: 4,500; Referee: Ola Hobber Nilsen

19 September 2021 19	Tromsø	1–1	Brann	Tromsø
20:00 CEST	Vesterlund 18'; Psyché (yellow card) 60'	Report	Knudsen (yellow card) 56' (yellow-red card) 88'; Sery Larsen 70'; Heltne Nilsen (yellow card) 84'	Stadium: Alfheim Stadion; Attendance: 1,988; Referee: Svein Oddvar Moen

26 September 2021 20	Brann	3–1	Kristiansund	Bergen
18:00 CEST	D. P. Ulvestad 19' (o.g.); Strand 78'; Rasmussen 89'	Report	Sery Larsen 41' (o.g.); Muçolli (yellow card) 77'; P. E. Ulvestad (yellow card) 80'; Coly (yellow card) 88'	Stadium: Brann Stadion; Attendance: 8,076; Referee: Tom Harald Hagen

3 October 2021 21	Mjøndalen	1–1	Brann	Mjøndalen
18:00 CEST	Sporrong (yellow card) 41' (yellow-red card) 45'; Brustad (yellow card) 45'; Larsen 75'; Ovenstad (yellow card) 90+5'	Report	Taylor 28'	Stadium: Consto Arena; Attendance: 2,408; Referee: Tore Hansen

17 October 2021 22	Brann	1–1	Stabæk	Bergen
17:00 CEST	Skaanes 90+1'	Report	Mesík 38' (yellow card) 43'; Sandberg (yellow card) 76'; Kostadinov (yellow card) 79'	Stadium: Brann Stadion; Attendance: 13,524; Referee: Tommy Skjerven

24 October 2021 23	Odd	3–3	Brann	Skien
18:00 CEST	Svendsen 12', 45'; Owusu 52'	Report	Taylor 7'; Pallesen Knudsen 17' (yellow card) 90+1'; Heggebø 63'	Stadium: Skagerak Arena; Attendance: 3,728; Referee: Svein Oddvar Moen

28 October 2021 24	Brann	0–2	Viking	Bergen
17:00 CEST		Report	Sebulonsen 21'; Kabran (yellow card) 55' (goal) 64'; Stensness (yellow card) 60'; Østbø (yellow card) 71'	Stadium: Brann Stadion; Attendance: 8,421; Referee: Rohit Saggi

31 October 2021 25	Vålerenga	1–0	Brann	Oslo
20:00 CET	Kjartansson 44'	Report		Stadium: Intility Arena; Attendance: 6,193; Referee: Svein Oddvar Moen

6 November 2021 26	Brann	2–2	Rosenborg	Bergen
18:00 CET	Heltne Nilsen (yellow card) 14'; Finne 23'; Taylor 25'	Report	Reitan (yellow card) 14'; Ceide 16' (yellow card) 59'; Holse 54'	Stadium: Brann Stadion; Attendance: 11,113; Referee: Espen Eskås

21 November 2021 27	Sandefjord	2–2	Brann	Sandefjord
17:00 CET	Jónsson 15'; Normann Hansen 17'; Kreuzriegler (yellow card) 50'	Report	Heggebø 6'; Heltne Nilsen (yellow card) 14'; Finne 90+3'	Stadium: Release Arena; Attendance: 3,609; Referee: Tore Hansen

28 November 2021 28	Brann	0–1	Molde	Bergen
19:00 CET		Report	Haugen (yellow card) 34'; Wolff Eikrem 61'	Stadium: Brann Stadion; Attendance: 9,824; Referee: Ola Hobber Nilsen

5 December 2021 29	Bodø/Glimt	2–2	Brann	Bodø
17:00 CET	Moe 4'; Saltnes 67'	Report	Wassberg 79'; Finne 90+2'	Stadium: Aspmyra Stadion; Attendance: 5,038; Referee: Svein Oddvar Moen

12 December 2021 30	Brann	2–1	Sarpsborg 08	Bergen
17:00 CET	Knudsen (yellow card) 6'; Heggebø 59'; Wolfe 66'; Heltne Nilsen (yellow card) 87'	Report	Karamoko (yellow card) 35'; Ødegård (yellow card) 42'; Thomassen (yellow card) 74'; Wichne (yellow card) 82'; Jarl (yellow card) 87'; Čanađija 90'	Stadium: Brann Stadion; Attendance: 10,527; Referee: Ola Hobber Nilsen

==== Table ====
Pos	Team	Pld	W	D	L	GF	GA	GD	Pts	Qualification or relegation
12	Tromsø	30	8	11	11	33	44	−11	35	
13	Odd	30	8	9	13	44	58	−14	33	
14	Brann (R)	30	5	11	14	38	55	−17	26	Qualification for the relegation play-offs
15	Stabæk (R)	30	6	7	17	35	62	−27	25	Relegation to First Division
16	Mjøndalen (R)	30	4	10	16	33	52	−19	22	Relegation to First Division

Source: Football Association of Norway (in Norwegian)
Rules for classification: 1) Points; 2) Goal difference; 3) Goals scored; 4) Head-to-head points; 5) Head-to-head goal difference; 6) Head-to-head away goals scored (only if between two teams); 7) Head-to-head goals scored; 8) Play-off (only used to decide champions or relegation).
(R) Relegated

==== Relegation play-offs ====
15 December 2021	Brann	4–4 (a.e.t.) (7–8 p)	Jerv	Oslo
19:00 CET	Finne (penalty missed) 32'; Heggebø 49'; Rasmussen (penalty missed) 55'; Hove (red card) 92'; Skaanes 114'; Sakor 116'; Heltne Nilsen 120'	Report	Wichne 29'; Norheim (yellow card) 54'; Campos (yellow card) 71' (goal) 93' (pen.), 112'; Ibrahim 117'	Stadium: Intility Arena; Attendance: 600; Referee: Svein Oddvar Moen
	Penalties
	Simba (penalty scored); Rasmussen (penalty scored); Heggebø (penalty scored); Sakor (penalty missed); Heltne Nilsen (yellow card) (penalty scored); Skaanes (penalty scored); Blomberg (penalty scored); Kolskogen (penalty scored); Taylor (penalty missed)		(penalty scored) Campos; (penalty scored) Wichmann; (penalty scored) Arrocha; (penalty missed) Norheim; (penalty scored) Sandberg; (penalty scored) Furtado; (penalty scored) Schröter; (penalty scored) Solli; (penalty scored) Ibrahim

=== Norwegian Cup ===
24 July 2021 First Round	Bjarg	0–5	Brann	Bergen
15:00 CEST	Strand (yellow card) 61'	Report	Pedersen 10'; Bamba 21'; Delaveris 44'; Taylor 50'; Sané 66'	Stadium: Stavollen Idrettspark; Attendance: 700; Referee: Sondre Brudvik

1 August 2021 Second Round	Fana	0–3	Brann	Bergen
14:00 CEST	Fosse-Iversen (yellow card) 45+2'; Martinsen (yellow card) 50' (yellow-red card) 69'; Høynes (yellow card) 89'	Report	Pedersen 17', 78'; Taylor 90+3'	Stadium: Varden Amfi; Attendance: 700; Referee: Torgeir Halsen

22 September 2021 Third Round	Harstad	0–5	Brann	Harstad
18:00 CEST		Report	Rasmussen 18'; Sery Larsen (yellow card) 37'; Simba 50'; Heggebø 62', 65'; Sakor 71'	Stadium: Harstad Stadion; Attendance: 1,000; Referee: Eiving Bodding

Fourth round took place during the 2022 season.
