= 2020 SK Brann season =

Brann
2020 season
- President: Eivind Lunde
- Manager: Lars Arne Nilsen (until 26 June); Kåre Ingebrigtsen (from 8 August)
- Stadium: Brann Stadion
- Eliteserien: 10th
- Norwegian Cup: Canceled due to the COVID-19 pandemic
- Top goalscorer: League: Gilbert Koomson (10); All: Gilbert Koomson (10)
Home colours	Away colours

The 2020 season was Brann's fifth season back in Eliteserien since their relegation at the end of the 2014 season.

== Season events ==
On 12 June, the Norwegian Football Federation announced that a maximum of 200 home fans would be allowed to attend the upcoming seasons matches.

On 26 June, Lars Arne Nilsen left Brann by mutual consent. On 8 August, Kåre Ingebrigtsen was announced as Brann's new manager.

On 10 September, the Norwegian Football Federation cancelled the 2020 Norwegian Cup due to the COVID-19 pandemic in Norway.

On 30 September, the Minister of Culture and Gender Equality, Abid Raja, announced that clubs would be able to have crowds of 600 at games from 12 October.

== Squad ==
As of 22 September 2020

Note: Flags indicate national team as defined under FIFA eligibility rules; some limited exceptions apply. Players may hold more than one non-FIFA nationality.

No.	Pos.	Nation	Player
1	GK	NOR	Håkon Opdal
2	DF	EST	Taijo Teniste
3	DF	NOR	Vegard Forren
4	DF	ISL	Jón Guðni Fjóluson
5	DF	NOR	Thomas Grøgaard
7	MF	NOR	Mathias Rasmussen
8	MF	NOR	Fredrik Haugen
9	MF	NOR	Petter Strand
10	MF	BIH	Amer Ordagić
11	FW	CIV	Daouda Bamba
14	FW	NOR	Erlend Hustad
15	DF	CRC	Bismar Acosta
16	MF	FIN	Robert Taylor

No.	Pos.	Nation	Player
17	DF	FRO	Gilli Rólantsson
18	DF	NOR	Ole Blomberg
19	DF	NOR	Jon-Helge Tveita
20	FW	NOR	Marcus Mehnert
21	DF	NOR	Ruben Kristiansen
22	DF	NOR	Vegard Skeie
23	MF	DEN	Daniel A. Pedersen
24	GK	NOR	Markus Olsen Pettersen
25	DF	NOR	Ole Martin Kolskogen
27	FW	NOR	Sander Svendsen (on loan from OB)
29	MF	NOR	Kristoffer Barmen
30	GK	COM	Ali Ahamada
41	FW	NOR	Mikal Kvinge

=== Out on loan ===
Note: Flags indicate national team as defined under FIFA eligibility rules; some limited exceptions apply. Players may hold more than one non-FIFA nationality.

No.	Pos.	Nation	Player
6	DF	SWE	Jesper Löfgren (on loan to Mjällby)
12	GK	NOR	Eirik Johansen (on loan to Kristiansund)
39	MF	NOR	Aune Selland Heggebø (on loan to Øygarden)

== Transfers ==
=== In ===
Date	Position	Nationality	Name	From	Fee	Ref.
21 December 2019	DF	(Norway)	Ole Martin Kolskogen	Åsane	Undisclosed	
12 January 2020	MF	(Denmark)	Daniel Pedersen	Lillestrøm	Undisclosed	
20 January 2020	MF	(Finland)	Robert Taylor	Tromsø	Undisclosed	
3 February 2020	DF	(Norway)	Jon-Helge Tveita	Sarpsborg 08	Undisclosed	
9 June 2020	DF	(Norway)	Vegard Forren	Molde	Free	
9 June 2020	GK	(Comoros)	Ali Ahamada	Kongsvinger	40000 EUR	
17 September 2020	DF	(Norway)	Ole Didrik Blomberg	Åsane	200000 Eur	
17 September 2020	DF	(Norway)	Vegard Skeie	Os	Free Transfer	
22 September 2020	DF	(Iceland)	Jón Gudni Fjóluson	Krasnodar	Free Transfer	
2 October 2020	MF	(Norway)	Mathias Rasmussen	Nordsjælland	Undisclosed	

=== Loans in ===
Date from	Position	Nationality	Name	to	Date to	Ref.
10 March 2020	GK	(Germany)	Ralf Fährmann	Schalke 04	9 June 2020	
8 October 2020	FW	(Norway)	Sander Svendsen	OB	End of season	

=== Out ===
Date	Position	Nationality	Name	To	Fee	Ref.
18 December 2019	DF	(Netherlands)	Vito Wormgoor	Columbus Crew	Free Transfer	
13 January 2020	FW	(Norway)	Veton Berisha	Viking	Undisclosed	
18 January 2020	MF	(Norway)	Ruben Yttergård Jenssen	Tromsø	Undisclosed	
24 January 2020	MF	(Norway)	Eirik Moldenes	Øygarden	Undisclosed	
20 February 2020	MF	(Norway)	Marius Bildøy	Lysekloster	Undisclosed	
9 September 2020	DF	(Norway)	Christian Eggen Rismark	Ranheim	Undisclosed	
2 October 2020	FW	(Ghana)	Gilbert Koomson	Kasımpaşa	Undisclosed	

=== Loans out ===
Date from	Position	Nationality	Name	to	Date to	Ref.
30 January 2020	DF	(Norway)	Nicholas Marthinussen	Notodden	End of season	
5 February 2020	DF	(Sweden)	Jesper Löfgren	Mjällby	End of season	
20 February 2020	DF	(Norway)	Emil Kalsaas	Åsane	End of season	
15 June 2020	GK	(Norway)	Eirik Johansen	Kristiansund	End of season	
30 June 2020	FW	(Norway)	Aune Heggebø	Øygarden	End of season	

=== Released ===
Date	Position	Nationality	Name	Joined	Date
7 February 2020	MF	(Norway)	Andreas Mjøs	Retired	

== Competitions ==
=== Eliteserien ===
==== Results summary ====
Overall								Home						Away					
Pld	W	D	L	GF	GA	GD	Pts	W	D	L	GF	GA	GD	W	D	L	GF	GA	GD
30	9	9	12	40	49	−9	36	4	5	6	20	18	+2	5	4	6	20	31	−11

Last updated: 22 December 2020.
Source: Results

==== Results by round ====
Round	1	2	3	4	5	6	7	8	9	10	11	12	13	14	15	16	17	18	19	20	21	22	23	24	25	26	27	28	29	30
Ground	A	H	A	H	A	A	H	A	H	H	A	H	A	H	A	H	A	H	A	H	A	H	A	H	A	H	A	H	A	H
Result	W	W	D	L	W	L	W	L	D	D	L	L	W	L	W	D	L	L	D	L	L	D	D	L	W	W	L	D	D	W
Position	3	2	3	5	3	4	3	5	6	7	8	8	7	8	7	7	9	10	10	10	12	13	12	12	11	10	10	10	11	10

Updated to match(es) played on 22 December 2020. Source: Results
A = Away; H = Home; W = Win; D = Draw; L = Loss

==== Results ====
17 June 2020 1	Haugesund	1–2	Brann	Haugesund
20:30 CEST (UTC+2)	Krygård (yellow card) 45'; Sandberg 60'	Report	Taylor 50'; Barmen (yellow card) 57'; Koomson (yellow card) 59'; Acosta (yellow card) 65'; Teniste (yellow card) 71'; Pedersen 90+6'	Stadium: Haugesund Stadion; Attendance: 200; Referee: Rohit Saggi

21 June 2020 2	Brann	3–0	Viking	Bergen
20:30 CEST (UTC+2)	Bamba 52'; Koomson 61'; Pedersen (yellow card) 72'; Ahamada (yellow card) 79'; Hustad 90+4' (yellow card) 90+4'	Report	Vevatne (yellow card) 69'; Høiland (penalty missed) 78' (yellow card) 87'	Stadium: Brann Stadion; Attendance: 200; Referee: Tommy Skjerven

24 June 2020 3	Aalesunds	2–2	Brann	Ålesund
18:00 CEST (UTC+2)	Sæthre (yellow card) 11'; Castro 30' (yellow card) 87'; Friðjónsson 72'; Uzochukwu (yellow card) 75'	Report	Forren (yellow card) 34'; Bamba 53', 59'	Stadium: Color Line Stadion; Attendance: 200; Referee: Espen Eskås

28 June 2020 4	Brann	1–2	Rosenborg	Bergen
20:30 CEST (UTC+2)	Koomson 5' (yellow card) 51'; Strand (yellow card) 45+1'	Report	Hovland 45+2'; Islamović (yellow card) 72'; Holse 90'	Stadium: Brann Stadion; Attendance: 200; Referee: Tore Hansen

2 July 2020 5	Sarpsborg 08	0–1	Brann	Sarpsborg
20:30 CEST (UTC+2)	Larsen (yellow card) 50'	Report	Koomson 42'; Kolskogen (yellow card) 50'	Stadium: Sarpsborg Stadion; Attendance: 200; Referee: Svein Oddvar Moen

5 July 2020 6	Bodø/Glimt	5–0	Brann	Bodø
18:00 CEST (UTC+2)	Junker 7', 12', 54'; Zinckernagel 32' (pen.); Saltnes 34'	Report	Ordagić (yellow card) 41'	Stadium: Aspmyra Stadion; Attendance: 200; Referee: Espen Eskås

12 July 2020 7	Brann	3–1	Sandefjord	Bergen
20:30 CEST (UTC+2)	Taylor 7'; Koomson 9', 12'; Forren (yellow card) 10'; Ahamada (yellow card) 23'; Acosta (yellow card) 41'; Ordagić (yellow card) 50'	Report	Rufo (penalty missed) 20'; Celorrio 22' (pen.); Kurtovic (yellow card) 51'; Jónsson (yellow card) 81'	Stadium: Brann Stadion; Attendance: 200; Referee: Rohit Saggi

15 July 2020 8	Odd	1–0	Brann	Skien
20:30 CEST (UTC+2)	Kaasa 53'; Lunding (yellow card) 77'	Report	Ordagić (yellow card) 64'; Hustad (yellow card) 85'	Stadium: Skagerak Arena; Attendance: 200; Referee: Mohammad Aslam

19 July 2020 9	Brann	1–1	Start	Bergen
20:30 CEST (UTC+2)	Koomson 41'; Kolskogen (yellow card) 59'	Report	Ahamada 28' (o.g.); Kabran (yellow card) 34'; Schulze (yellow card) 45'; Twum (yellow card) 85'; Segberg (yellow card) 86'	Stadium: Brann Stadion; Attendance: 200; Referee: Tommy Skjerven

25 July 2020 10	Brann	1–1	Kristiansund	Bergen
20:30 CEST (UTC+2)	Ordagić (yellow card) 17'; Bamba (yellow card) 28'; Kristiansen (yellow card) 46'; Koomson 73' (yellow card) 73'; Acosta (yellow card) 90+4'	Report	D.Ulvestad 87'	Stadium: Brann Stadion; Attendance: 200; Referee: Espen Eskås

29 July 2020 11	Strømsgodset	3–1	Brann	Drammen
18:00 CEST (UTC+2)	Teniste 8' (o.g.); Gunnarsson (yellow card) 21'; Mawa 54'; Mølvadgaard 90+3'	Report	Koomson 72'	Stadium: Marienlyst Stadion; Attendance: 200; Referee: Tom Harald Hagen

1 August 2020 12	Brann	1–2	Vålerenga	Bergen
20:30 CEST (UTC+2)	Barmen 10' (pen.); Taylor (yellow card) 30'	Report	Finne 30' (pen.), 47' (pen.); Myhre (yellow card) 70'; Camara (yellow card) 83'; Klaesson (yellow card) 90+4'	Stadium: Brann Stadion; Attendance: 200; Referee: Svein Oddvar Moen

10 August 2020 13	Molde	1–2	Brann	Molde
20:30 CEST (UTC+2)	Brynhildsen 17'; Eikrem (yellow card) 77'	Report	Pedersen 12'; Forren (yellow card) 29'; Bamba (yellow card) 34'; Tveita 54'	Stadium: Aker Stadion; Attendance: 200; Referee: Espen Eskås

16 August 2020 14	Brann	0–1	Mjøndalen	Bergen
18:00 CEST (UTC+2)		Report	Hellum 85'	Stadium: Brann Stadion; Attendance: 200; Referee: Tom Harald Hagen

24 August 2020 15	Stabæk	0–2	Brann	Bærum
20:30 CEST (UTC+2)	Botheim (yellow card) 68'; Bohinen (yellow card) 83'	Report	Taylor 62'; Barmen (yellow card) 74'; Bamba 90+4'	Stadium: Nadderud Stadion; Attendance: 200; Referee: Tore Hansen

29 August 2020 16	Brann	1–1	Strømsgodset	Bergen
20:30 CEST (UTC+2)	Strand 33'	Report	Hove 42'	Stadium: Brann Stadion; Attendance: 200; Referee: Ola Hobber Nilsen

13 September 2020 17	Vålerenga	5–1	Brann	Oslo
20:00 CEST (UTC+2)	Sahraoui 4', 35'; Kjartansson 14', 16', 23'	Report	Strand 8' (yellow card) 65'	Stadium: Intility Arena; Attendance: 200; Referee: Tore Hansen

20 September 2020 18	Brann	1–3	Bodø/Glimt	Bergen
18:00 CEST (UTC+2)	Barmen (yellow card) 45'; Grøgaard 78'	Report	Fet (yellow card) 19'; Zinckernagel 51', 67'; J.Hauge 71'; Boniface (yellow card) 90+2'	Stadium: Brann Stadion; Attendance: 200; Referee: Rohit Saggi

27 September 2020 19	Kristiansund	1–1	Brann	Kristiansund
18:00 CEST (UTC+2)	Diop (yellow card) 41'; Pellegrino 63' (pen.)	Report	Tveita (yellow card) 29'; Pedersen (yellow card) 47'; Taylor (yellow card) 57'; Opdal (yellow card) 61'; Bamba 73'	Stadium: Kristiansund Stadion; Attendance: 200; Referee: Espen Eskås

4 October 2020 20	Brann	1–2	Molde	Bergen
18:00 CEST (UTC+2)	Bamba 14'	Report	Hestad 13'; Bolly (yellow card) 82'; Kristiansen 85' (o.g.)	Stadium: Brann Stadion; Attendance: 200; Referee: Ola Hobber Nilsen

17 October 2020 21	Mjøndalen	2–0	Brann	Mjøndalen
18:00 CEST (UTC+2)	Ovenstad 13'; Twum 37' (yellow card) 66'; Liseth (yellow card) 90+3'	Report	Kristiansen (yellow card) 29'; Grøgaard (yellow card) 90+6'	Stadium: Consto Arena; Attendance: 600; Referee: Tom Harald Hagen

24 October 2020 22	Brann	1–1	Stabæk	Bergen
18:00 CEST (UTC+2)	Haugen (yellow card) 43'; Barmen 75' (yellow card) 84'	Report	Edvardsen 51'; Bohinen (yellow card) 59'	Stadium: Brann Stadion; Attendance: 600; Referee: Sigurd Smehus Kringstad

1 November 2020 23	Sandefjord	3–3	Brann	Sandefjord
18:00 CET (UTC+1)	Kreuzriegler 18'; Singh 60'; Jónsson 63'; Pálsson (yellow card) 70'	Report	Pedersen (yellow card) 33'; Taylor 60'; Strand 68'; Haugen 90+5'	Stadium: Sandefjord Arena; Attendance: 600; Referee: Mohammad Usman Aslam

7 November 2020 24	Brann	1–2	Haugesund	Bergen
20:30 CET (UTC+1)	Strand 61'; Fjóluson (yellow card) 67'	Report	Ahamada 56' (o.g.); Sandberg 66' (pen.); Stølås (yellow card) 75'; Therkildsen (yellow card) 81'; Sandvik (yellow card) 90+3'	Stadium: Brann Stadion; Attendance: 600; Referee: Tom Harald Hagen

24 November 2020 25	Rosenborg	2–3	Brann	Trondheim
20:00 CET (UTC+1)	Zachariassen 81'; Eyjólfsson 90+3'	Report	Taylor 22' (yellow card) 90+4'; Bamba 23'; Svendsen 47'; Strand (yellow card) 90+1'	Stadium: Lerkendal Stadion; Attendance: 600; Referee: Tore Hansen

28 November 2020 26	Brann	3–1	Aalesunds	Bergen
18:00 CET (UTC+1)	Barmen (penalty missed) 21'; Bamba 36', 44', 61'; Kolskogen (yellow card) 88'	Report	Ólafsson (yellow card) 16'; Kongshavn (yellow card) 28'; Fiskerstrand 39'	Stadium: Brann Stadion; Attendance: 600; Referee: Ola Hobber Nilsen

2 December 2020 27	Viking	2–0	Brann	Stavanger
18:00 CET (UTC+1)	Berisha 17'; Ibrahimaj 67'	Report		Stadium: Viking Stadion; Attendance: 600; Referee: Sigurd Smehus Kringstad

6 December 2020 28	Brann	1–1	Sarpsborg 08	Bergen
17:00 CET (UTC+1)	Barmen 75'; Fjóluson (yellow card) 85'	Report	Utvik (yellow card) 7'; Vetti 52'; Jarl (yellow card) 64'; Halvorsen (yellow card) 66'	Stadium: Brann Stadion; Attendance: 600; Referee: Dag Vidar Hafsås

9 December 2020 29	Start	1–1	Brann	Kristiansand
20:00 CET (UTC+1)	Markovic (yellow card) 65'; Schulze 69'; Segberg (yellow card) 85'	Report	Strand 60'; Bamba (penalty missed) 85'	Stadium: Sør Arena; Attendance: 600; Referee: Ola Hobber Nilsen

22 December 30	Brann	2–1	Odd	Bergen
18:00 CET (UTC+1)	Taylor 45+4' (pen.); Forren (yellow card) 54'; Tveita 71'	Report	Jørgensen (yellow card) 45+4'; Bakenga 65'; Lauritsen (yellow card) 69'	Stadium: Brann Stadion; Attendance: 600; Referee: Espen Eskås

==== Table ====
Pos	Team	Pld	W	D	L	GF	GA	GD	Pts
8	Stabæk	30	9	12	9	41	45	−4	39
9	Haugesund	30	11	6	13	39	51	−12	39
10	Brann	30	9	9	12	40	49	−9	36
11	Sandefjord	30	9	8	13	31	43	−12	35
12	Sarpsborg 08	30	8	8	14	33	43	−10	32

Source: Football Association of Norway (in Norwegian)
Rules for classification: 1) Points; 2) Goal difference; 3) Goals scored; 4) Head-to-head points; 5) Head-to-head goal difference; 6) Head-to-head away goals scored (only if between two teams); 7) Head-to-head goals scored; 8) Play-off (only used to decide champions or relegation).

=== Norwegian Cup ===
2020 First round	–
CEST (UTC+2)
Note: Cup cancelled on 10 September due to the COVID-19 pandemic in Norway.

== Squad statistics ==
As of match played 22 December 2020

=== Appearances and goals ===
No.	Pos	Nat	Player	Total		Eliteserien		Norwegian Cup	
No.	Pos	Nat	Player	Apps	Goals	Apps	Goals	Apps	Goals
1	GK	(Norway) NOR	Håkon Opdal	17	0	17	0	0	0
2	DF	(Estonia) EST	Taijo Teniste	10	0	7+3	0	0	0
3	DF	(Norway) NOR	Vegard Forren	25	0	25	0	0	0
4	DF	(Iceland) ISL	Jón Guðni Fjóluson	11	0	11	0	0	0
5	DF	(Norway) NOR	Thomas Grøgaard	24	1	19+5	1	0	0
7	MF	(Norway) NOR	Mathias Rasmussen	8	0	6+2	0	0	0
8	MF	(Norway) NOR	Fredrik Haugen	21	1	12+9	1	0	0
9	MF	(Norway) NOR	Petter Strand	29	5	27+2	5	0	0
10	MF	(Bosnia and Herzegovina) BIH	Amer Ordagić	11	0	11	0	0	0
11	FW	(Ivory Coast) CIV	Daouda Bamba	30	10	30	10	0	0
14	FW	(Norway) NOR	Erlend Hustad	18	1	0+18	1	0	0
15	DF	(Costa Rica) CRC	Bismar Acosta	10	0	4+6	0	0	0
16	MF	(Finland) FIN	Robert Taylor	30	6	24+6	6	0	0
17	DF	(Faroe Islands) FRO	Gilli Rólantsson	12	0	1+11	0	0	0
18	DF	(Norway) NOR	Ole Blomberg	8	0	7+1	0	0	0
19	MF	(Norway) NOR	Jon-Helge Tveita	19	2	12+7	2	0	0
20	FW	(Norway) NOR	Marcus Mehnert	7	0	0+7	0	0	0
21	DF	(Norway) NOR	Ruben Kristiansen	21	0	18+3	0	0	0
23	MF	(Denmark) DEN	Daniel A. Pedersen	19	2	19	2	0	0
24	GK	(Norway) NOR	Markus Olsen Pettersen	3	0	3	0	0	0
25	DF	(Norway) NOR	Ole Martin Kolskogen	21	0	19+2	0	0	0
27	FW	(Norway) NOR	Sander Svendsen	10	1	8+2	1	0	0
29	MF	(Norway) NOR	Kristoffer Barmen	26	3	21+5	3	0	0
30	GK	(Comoros) COM	Ali Ahamada	10	0	10	0	0	0
34	FW	(Norway) NOR	Sondre Eide	1	0	0+1	0	0	0
41	FW	(Norway) NOR	Mikal Kvinge	2	0	1+1	0	0	0
Players away from Brann on loan:
Players who left Brann during the season
4	DF	(Norway) NOR	Christian Eggen Rismark	8	0	1+7	0	0	0
7	FW	(Ghana) GHA	Gilbert Koomson	17	8	17	8	0	0

=== Goal scorers ===
Place	Position	Nation	Number	Name	Eliteserien	Norwegian Cup	Total
1	FW	(Ivory Coast)	11	Daouda Bamba	10	0	10
2	FW	(Ghana)	7	Gilbert Koomson	8	0	8
3	MF	(Finland)	16	Robert Taylor	6	0	6
4	MF	(Norway)	9	Petter Strand	5	0	5
5	MF	(Norway)	29	Kristoffer Barmen	3	0	3
6	MF	(Denmark)	23	Daniel Pedersen	2	0	2
6	MF	(Norway)	19	Jon-Helge Tveita	2	0	2
8	FW	(Norway)	14	Erlend Hustad	1	0	1
8	DF	(Norway)	5	Thomas Grøgaard	1	0	1
8	MF	(Norway)	8	Fredrik Haugen	1	0	1
8	FW	(Norway)	27	Sander Svendsen	1	0	1
				TOTALS	40	0	40

=== Clean sheets ===
Place	Position	Nation	Number	Name	Eliteserien	Norwegian Cup	Total
1	GK	(Comoros)	30	Ali Ahamada	2	0	2
2	GK	(Norway)	24	Markus Pettersen	1	0	1
				TOTALS	3	0	3

=== Disciplinary record ===
Number	Nation	Position	Name	Eliteserien		Norwegian Cup		Total	
Number	Nation	Position	Name	Booked	Sent off (straight red)	Booked	Sent off (straight red)	Booked	Sent off (straight red)
1	(Norway)	GK	Håkon Opdal	1	0	0	0	1	0
2	(Estonia)	DF	Taijo Teniste	1	0	0	0	1	0
3	(Norway)	DF	Vegard Forren	4	0	0	0	4	0
4	(Iceland)	DF	Jón Guðni Fjóluson	2	0	0	0	2	0
5	(Norway)	DF	Thomas Grøgaard	1	0	0	0	1	0
8	(Norway)	MF	Fredrik Haugen	1	0	0	0	1	0
9	(Norway)	MF	Petter Strand	3	0	0	0	3	0
10	(Bosnia and Herzegovina)	MF	Amer Ordagić	4	0	0	0	4	0
11	(Ivory Coast)	FW	Daouda Bamba	2	0	0	0	2	0
14	(Norway)	FW	Erlend Hustad	2	0	0	0	2	0
15	(Costa Rica)	DF	Bismar Acosta	3	0	0	0	3	0
16	(Finland)	MF	Robert Taylor	3	0	0	0	3	0
19	(Norway)	MF	Jon-Helge Tveita	1	0	0	0	1	0
21	(Norway)	DF	Ruben Kristiansen	2	0	0	0	2	0
23	(Denmark)	MF	Daniel Pedersen	3	0	0	0	3	0
25	(Norway)	DF	Ole Martin Kolskogen	3	0	0	0	3	0
29	(Norway)	MF	Kristoffer Barmen	4	0	0	0	4	0
30	(Comoros)	GK	Ali Ahamada	2	0	0	0	2	0
Players who left Brann during the season:
7	(Ghana)	FW	Gilbert Koomson	3	0	0	0	3	0
			TOTALS	45	0	0	0	45	0
