= 2023 SK Brann season =

Brann
2023 season
- Chairman: Aslak Sverdrup
- Head coach: Eirik Horneland
- Stadium: Brann Stadion
- Eliteserien: 2nd
- 2022 Norwegian Cup: Winners
- 2023 Norwegian Cup: Quarter-finals
- UEFA Europa Conference League: Play-off round
- Top goalscorer: League: Bård Finne (16); All: Bård Finne (24)
- Biggest win: Fjøra 1–8 Brann
| Home colours | Away colours |

The 2023 season was SK Brann's 115th season in existence and the club's first season back in the top flight of Norwegian football. In addition to the domestic league, SK Brann participated in this season's edition of the Norwegian Football Cup and the UEFA Europa Conference League.

== Players ==
=== First-team squad ===
As of 4 September 2023

Note: Flags indicate national team as defined under FIFA eligibility rules; some limited exceptions apply. Players may hold more than one non-FIFA nationality.

| No. | Pos. | Nation | Player |
|---|---|---|---|
| 1 | GK | NOR | Mathias Dyngeland |
| 3 | DF | NOR | Fredrik Pallesen Knudsen |
| 6 | DF | DEN | Japhet Sery Larsen |
| 7 | FW | DEN | Magnus Warming |
| 8 | MF | NOR | Felix Horn Myhre |
| 9 | FW | CHI | Niklas Castro |
| 10 | MF | DEN | Frederik Børsting |
| 11 | FW | NOR | Bård Finne |
| 12 | GK | NOR | Eirik Holmen Johansen |
| 13 | DF | DEN | Svenn Crone |
| 14 | MF | NOR | Ulrik Mathisen |
| 16 | FW | NOR | Ole Didrik Blomberg |

| No. | Pos. | Nation | Player |
|---|---|---|---|
| 17 | DF | NOR | Joachim Soltvedt |
| 18 | MF | NOR | Sander Kartum |
| 19 | MF | NOR | Sivert Heltne Nilsen (captain) |
| 20 | FW | NOR | Aune Heggebø |
| 21 | DF | NOR | Ruben Kristiansen |
| 22 | DF | SWE | Moonga Simba |
| 23 | DF | NOR | Thore Pedersen |
| 25 | MF | NOR | Niklas Jensen Wassberg |
| 27 | MF | NOR | Mads Sande |
| 33 | MF | NOR | Marius Trengereid |
| 35 | DF | NOR | Jonas Torsvik |
| 40 | DF | NOR | Eivind Helland |

=== Out on loan ===
Note: Flags indicate national team as defined under FIFA eligibility rules; some limited exceptions apply. Players may hold more than one non-FIFA nationality.

| No. | Pos. | Nation | Player |
|---|---|---|---|
| — | FW | NOR | Elias Myrlid (at Kongsvinger) |
| — | FW | NOR | Filip Delaveris (at Sandnes Ulf) |

| No. | Pos. | Nation | Player |
|---|---|---|---|
| — | DF | NOR | Rasmus Holten (at Mjøndalen) |
| — | MF | NOR | Isak Tomar Hjorteseth (at Åsane) |

== Transfers ==
=== Winter ===
In: Note: Flags indicate national team as defined under FIFA eligibility rules; some limited exceptions apply. Players may hold more than one non-FIFA nationality.

| No. | Pos. | Nation | Player |
|---|---|---|---|
| 6 | DF | DEN | Japhet Sery Larsen (from Bodø/Glimt) |
| 14 | MF | NOR | Ulrik Mathisen (from Lillestrøm) |
| 23 | DF | NOR | Thore Pedersen (from Haugesund) |

Out: Note: Flags indicate national team as defined under FIFA eligibility rules; some limited exceptions apply. Players may hold more than one non-FIFA nationality.

| No. | Pos. | Nation | Player |
|---|---|---|---|
| 5 | DF | DEN | Andreas Skovgaard (to Stabæk) |
| 6 | MF | NOR | Vegard Leikvoll Moberg (to Kongsvinger) |
| 15 | MF | NOR | Kasper Skaanes (to Sogndal) |
| 24 | GK | NOR | Markus Olsen Pettersen (to (Faroe Islands) KÍ Klaksvík) |
| 27 | DF | NOR | Runar Hove (retired) |
| – | DF | NOR | Ole Martin Kolskogen (to Aalesund, previously on loan at Jerv) |
| – | FW | SWE | Moonga Simba (on loan to (Sweden) GIF Sundsvall, previously on loan at (Sweden) Värnamo) |
| – | FW | NOR | Filip Møller Delaveris (on loan to (Sweden) J-Södra, previously on loan at KFUM) |

=== Summer ===
In: Note: Flags indicate national team as defined under FIFA eligibility rules; some limited exceptions apply. Players may hold more than one non-FIFA nationality.

| No. | Pos. | Nation | Player |
|---|---|---|---|
| 7 | FW | DEN | Magnus Warming (from (Italy) Torino) |
| 17 | DF | NOR | Joachim Soltvedt (from Sandnes Ulf) |
| 18 | MF | NOR | Sander Kartum (from Kristiansund) |
| 22 | DF | SWE | Moonga Simba (loan return from (Sweden) Sundsvall) |
| 27 | MF | NOR | Mads Berg Sande (from Haugesund) |
| 37 | MF | NOR | David Tufekcic (promoted from junior squad) |
| 41 | FW | NOR | Elias Myrlid (promoted from junior squad, previously on loan at Kristiansund) |
| 43 | DF | NOR | Rasmus Holten (promoted from junior squad) |

Out: Note: Flags indicate national team as defined under FIFA eligibility rules; some limited exceptions apply. Players may hold more than one non-FIFA nationality.

| No. | Pos. | Nation | Player |
|---|---|---|---|
| 7 | MF | NOR | Mathias Rasmussen (to (Belgium) Union SG) |
| 18 | DF | NOR | David Møller Wolfe (to (Netherlands) AZ Alkmaar) |
| 31 | MF | NOR | Isak Tomar Hjorteseth (on loan to Åsane) |
| 41 | FW | NOR | Elias Myrlid (on loan to Kongsvinger) |
| 43 | DF | NOR | Rasmus Holten (on loan to Mjøndalen) |
| – | FW | NOR | Filip Møller Delaveris (on loan to Sandnes Ulf, previously on loan at (Sweden) J-Södra) |

== Competitions ==
=== Overview ===
| Competition | First match | Last match | Starting round | Final position | Record | | | | | | | |
| Competition | First match | Last match | Starting round | Final position | Pld | W | D | L | GF | GA | GD | Win % |
|---|---|---|---|---|---|---|---|---|---|---|---|---|
| Eliteserien | 10 April 2023 | 3 December 2023 | Matchday 1 | 2nd | 30 | 19 | 4 | 7 | 55 | 35 | +20 | 63.33 |
| 2022 Norwegian Cup | 12 March 2023 | 20 May 2023 | Fourth round | Winners | 4 | 4 | 0 | 0 | 10 | 1 | +9 | 100.00 |
| 2023 Norwegian Cup | 25 May 2023 | 12 July 2023 | First round | Quarter-finals | 5 | 3 | 1 | 1 | 25 | 8 | +17 | 60.00 |
| UEFA Europa Conference League | 10 August 2023 | 31 August 2023 | Third qualifying round | Play-off round | 4 | 1 | 2 | 1 | 8 | 7 | +1 | 25.00 |
| Total | | | | | 43 | 27 | 7 | 9 | 98 | 51 | +47 | 62.79 |

Last updated: 3 December 2023
Source: Soccerway

=== Eliteserien ===
==== League table ====
| Pos | Team | Pld | W | D | L | GF | GA | GD | Pts | Qualification or relegation |
|---|---|---|---|---|---|---|---|---|---|---|
| 1 | Bodø/Glimt (C) | 30 | 22 | 4 | 4 | 78 | 38 | +40 | 70 | Qualification for the Champions League second qualifying round |
| 2 | Brann | 30 | 19 | 4 | 7 | 55 | 35 | +20 | 61 | Qualification for the Conference League second qualifying round |
| 3 | Tromsø | 30 | 19 | 4 | 7 | 48 | 33 | +15 | 61 | Qualification for the Conference League second qualifying round |
| 4 | Viking | 30 | 18 | 4 | 8 | 61 | 48 | +13 | 58 | |
| 5 | Molde | 30 | 15 | 6 | 9 | 65 | 39 | +26 | 51 | Qualification for the Europa League second qualifying round (Note: Molde qualified for the Europa League second qualifying round by winning the 2023 Norwegian Football Cup.) |

Source: Football Association of Norway (in Norwegian)
Rules for classification: 1) Points; 2) Goal difference; 3) Goals scored; 4) Head-to-head points; 5) Head-to-head goal difference; 6) Head-to-head goals scored.
(C) Champions

==== Results summary ====
| Overall | | | | | | | | Home | | | | | | Away | | | | | |
| Pld | W | D | L | GF | GA | GD | Pts | W | D | L | GF | GA | GD | W | D | L | GF | GA | GD |
|---|---|---|---|---|---|---|---|---|---|---|---|---|---|---|---|---|---|---|---|
| 30 | 19 | 4 | 7 | 55 | 35 | +20 | 61 | 12 | 2 | 1 | 35 | 15 | +20 | 7 | 2 | 6 | 20 | 20 | 0 |

Last updated: 3 December 2023.

==== Results by round ====
| Round | 1 | 2 | 3 | 4 | 5 | 6 | 7 | 8 | 9 | 10 | 11 | 12 | 13 | 14 | 15 | 16 | 17 | 18 | 19 | 20 | 21 | 22 | 23 | 24 | 25 | 26 | 27 | 28 | 29 | 30 |
|---|---|---|---|---|---|---|---|---|---|---|---|---|---|---|---|---|---|---|---|---|---|---|---|---|---|---|---|---|---|---|
| Ground | H | A | H | A | H | A | H | H | A | H | A | H | A | H | A | H | A | A | H | A | H | A | H | A | H | A | H | A | H | A |
| Result | W | L | W | D | D | L | W | W | W | D | L | W | L | W | L | L | W | W | W | W | W | W | W | W | W | D | W | W | W | L |
| Position | 1 | 6 | 2 | 5 | 5 | 8 | 5 | 3 | 2 | 3 | 5 | 5 | 5 | 5 | 6 | 6 | 6 | 5 | 5 | 5 | 5 | 5 | 4 | 3 | 3 | 3 | 2 | 2 | 2 | 2 |

A = Away; H = Home; W = Win; D = Draw; L = Loss

==== Matches ====
The league fixtures were announced on 9 December 2022.

| 10 April 2023 1 | Brann | 3–0 | Haugesund | Bergen |
| 19:15 CEST (UTC+2) | Nilsen 32' (pen.); Finne 34', 48' | Report | Christensen (yellow card) 3'; Selvik (yellow card) 49'; Liseth (yellow card) 54'; Samuelsen (yellow card) 75'; Krusnell (yellow card) 76' | Stadium: Brann Stadion; Attendance: 15,224; Referee: Rohit Saggi |

| 16 April 2023 2 | Odd | 2–0 | Brann | Skien |
| 17:00 CEST (UTC+2) | Jørgensen 45'; Ingebrigtsen 70'; Wallem (yellow card) 89' | Report | Nilsen (yellow card) 57'; Heggebø (yellow card) 90+4' | Stadium: Skagerak Arena; Attendance: 5,781; Referee: Espen Eskås |

| 22 April 2023 3 | Brann | 3–1 | Vålerenga | Bergen |
| 18:00 CEST (UTC+2) | Børsting 6'; Nilsen 73' (pen.); Heggebø 79' | Report | Larsen 15' (o.g.); Zuta (red card) 53' | Stadium: Brann Stadion; Attendance: 16,816; Referee: Tore Hansen |

| 29 April 2023 4 | Bodø/Glimt | 2–2 | Brann | Bodø |
| 18:00 CEST (UTC+2) | Pellegrino 78', 90+3' | Report | Wolfe (yellow card) 8'; Wassberg 15'; Finne 44'; Nilsen (yellow card) 49'; Kristiansen (yellow card) 85'; Crone (yellow card) 90+2' | Stadium: Aspmyra Stadion; Attendance: 7,626; Referee: Svein Oddvar Moen |

| 3 May 2023 18 | Rosenborg | 0–2 | Brann | Trondheim |
| 18:00 CEST (UTC+2) | Pereira (yellow card) 4'; Rogers (yellow card) 7'; Dahl Reitan (yellow card) 22'; Ingason (yellow card) 33'; Cornic (yellow card) 53' | Report | Nilsen 23' (yellow card) 77'; Finne 78' | Stadium: Lerkendal Stadion; Attendance: 13,021; Referee: Espen Eskås |

| 8 May 2023 5 | Brann | 0–0 | Sandefjord | Bergen |
| 19:00 CEST (UTC+2) | | Report | Dunsby (yellow card) 41'; Bikoro (yellow card) 65'; Keto (yellow card) 82' | Stadium: Brann Stadion; Attendance: 14,720; Referee: Mohammad Usman Aslam |

| 13 May 2023 6 | Sarpsborg 08 | 2–1 | Brann | Sarpsborg |
| 17:00 CEST (UTC+2) | Maigaard 24' (yellow card) 28'; Andersen 40'; Wichne (yellow card) 89' | Report | Finne 79' | Stadium: Sarpsborg Stadion; Attendance: 5,962; Referee: Marius Lien |

| 16 May 2023 7 | Brann | 4–1 | Stabæk | Bergen |
| 18:00 CEST (UTC+2) | Finne 30', 77'; Myhre 36'; Nilsen 63' | Report | Høgh 35' | Stadium: Brann Stadion; Attendance: 16,832; Referee: Svein Oddvar Moen |

| 29 May 2023 8 | Brann | 3–1 | Rosenborg | Bergen |
| 17:00 CEST (UTC+2) | Finne 12', 88'; Blomberg 51' (yellow card) 60'; Knudsen (yellow card) 84' | Report | Henriksen 71' (pen.); Skarsem (yellow card) 83' | Stadium: Brann Stadion; Attendance: 16,832; Referee: Sigurd Smehus Kringstad |

| 4 June 2023 9 | Aalesund | 1–3 | Brann | Ålesund |
| 17:00 CEST (UTC+2) | Ebiye 44'; Munksgaard (yellow card) 47'; Barmen (yellow card) 52' (yellow-red card) 70' | Report | Kristiansen (yellow card) 37'; Nilsen 48' (pen.); Castro 80'; Wolfe (yellow card) 88'; Mathisen 90' | Stadium: Color Line Stadion; Attendance: 5,331; Referee: Marius Hansen Grøtta |

| 11 June 2023 10 | Brann | 2–2 | Lillestrøm | Bergen |
| 19:15 CEST (UTC+2) | Nilsen 57' (pen.) (penalty missed) 89'; Castro 60'; Børsting (yellow card) 71'; Myhre (yellow card) 84' | Report | Edh 24' (yellow card) 56'; Garnås (yellow card) 36'; Tønnessen 74'; Skogvold (yellow card) 90' | Stadium: Brann Stadion; Attendance: 15,712; Referee: Rohit Saggi |

| 24 June 2023 11 | Viking | 3–1 | Brann | Stavanger |
| 18:00 CEST (UTC+2) | Tripić 41' (pen.), 75'; Yazbek (yellow card) 49'; Salvesen 69'; Diop (yellow card) 86' | Report | Finne 32'; Knudsen (yellow card) 60'; Nilsen (yellow card) 65'; Torsvik (yellow card) 90' | Stadium: Viking Stadion; Attendance: 15,007; Referee: Tore Hansen |

| 2 July 2023 12 | Brann | 2–1 | HamKam | Bergen |
| 17:00 CEST (UTC+2) | Torsvik 45+2'; Crone (yellow card) 54'; Finne 83' (pen.) | Report | Melgalvis (yellow card) 82'; Kirkevold 90+3' | Stadium: Brann Stadion; Attendance: 14,542; Referee: Svein Oddvar Moen |

| 9 July 2023 13 | Molde | 2–0 | Brann | Molde |
| 19:15 CEST (UTC+2) | Eriksen 12'; Breivik (yellow card) 58'; Kitolano (yellow card) 62'; Berisha 90+5' | Report | | Stadium: Aker Stadion; Attendance: 7,604; Referee: Rohit Saggi |

| 16 July 2023 14 | Brann | 1–0 | Strømsgodset | Bergen |
| 19:15 CEST (UTC+2) | Wassberg 29' | Report | Stenevik (yellow card) 45+1' | Stadium: Brann Stadion; Attendance: 13,051; Referee: Tore Hansen |

| 23 July 2023 15 | Tromsø | 3–1 | Brann | Tromsø |
| 17:00 CEST (UTC+2) | Romsaas 6', 46'; Antonsen (yellow card) 71'; Jenssen (yellow card) 75'; Yttergård Jenssen 90+3' | Report | Knudsen (yellow card) 17'; Øyvann 65' (o.g.) | Stadium: Romssa Arena; Attendance: 4,906; Referee: Espen Eskås |

| 30 July 2023 16 | Brann | 0–2 | Viking | Bergen |
| 17:00 CEST (UTC+2) | Larsen (yellow card) 38' | Report | Bjørshol 29'; Brekalo (yellow card) 54'; D'Agostino (yellow card) 87'; Sandberg 90+8' (pen.) | Stadium: Brann Stadion; Attendance: 15,903; Referee: Sigurd Smehus Kringstad |

| 6 August 2023 17 | HamKam | 0–2 | Brann | Hamar |
| 17:00 CEST (UTC+2) | Kongsro (yellow card) 22'; Sjølstad (yellow card) 45+1' | Report | Kartum 22'; Castro 23'; Simba (yellow card) 67' | Stadium: Briskeby Stadion; Attendance: 5,346; Referee: Mohammad Usman Aslam |

| 20 August 2023 19 | Brann | 5–1 | Aalesund | Bergen |
| 17:00 CEST (UTC+2) | Børsting 18'; Myhre 24'; Castro 44'; Finne 54'; Heggebø 80' | Report | Murray (yellow card) 35'; Atanga 52'; Ødemarksbakken (yellow card) 84' | Stadium: Brann Stadion; Attendance: 13,317; Referee: Christian Moen |

| 3 September 2023 21 | Brann | 1–0 | Sarpsborg 08 | Bergen |
| 17:00 CEST (UTC+2) | Børsting (yellow card) 4'; Finne (yellow card) 36' (penalty missed) 52'; Helte Nilsen 69' (pen.); Myhre (yellow card) 83'; Larsen (yellow card) 84' | Report | Skipper (yellow card) 42' (yellow-red card) 67'; Lundqvist (yellow card) 68'; Zehknini (yellow card) 77' | Stadium: Brann Stadion; Attendance: 11,603; Referee: Mohammad Usman Aslam |

| 17 September 2023 22 | Stabæk | 0–1 | Brann | Bærum |
| 17:00 CEST (UTC+2) | Krogstad (yellow card) 45+2'; Geelmuyden (yellow card) 76' | Report | Finne 12'; Larsen (yellow card) 77' | Stadium: Nadderud Stadion; Attendance: 4,515; Referee: Marius Hansen Grøtta |

| 24 September 2023 23 | Brann | 2–1 | Tromsø | Bergen |
| 19:15 CEST (UTC+2) | Børsting 40'; Finne (yellow card) 42' (goal) 45+2'; Nilsen (yellow card) 62' | Report | Romsaas (yellow card) 27'; Psyché (yellow card) 29'; Erlien 90+3' (pen.); Yttergård Jenssen (yellow card) 90+7' | Stadium: Brann Stadion; Attendance: 15,062; Referee: Svein Tore Sinnes |

| 1 October 2023 20 | Lillestrøm | 0–2 | Brann | Lillestrøm |
| 15:00 CEST (UTC+2) | Rogers (yellow card) 22'; Ibrahimaj (yellow card) 22'; Thompson (yellow card) 27'; Edh (yellow card) 57'; Gabrielsen (yellow card) 68'; Garnås (yellow card) 75' | Report | Nilsen 31' (pen.); Larsen (yellow card) 32'; Pedersen (yellow card) 42'; Mathisen 47' | Stadium: Åråsen Stadion; Attendance: 9,343; Referee: Mohammad Usman Aslam |

| 8 October 2023 24 | Vålerenga | 1–2 | Brann | Oslo |
| 19:15 CEST (UTC+2) | Ilić 7'; Hagen (yellow card) 68'; Juklerød (red card) 72' | Report | Børsting 31'; Soltvedt 57'; Finne (red card) 66' | Stadium: Intility Arena; Attendance: 10,011; Referee: Sigurd Smehus Kringstad |

| 21 October 2023 25 | Brann | 3–2 | Molde | Bergen |
| 18:00 CEST (UTC+2) | Kartum (yellow card) 22' (goal) 48', 78'; Børsting 72'; Heggebø (yellow card) 89' | Report | Gulbrandsen 5' (yellow card) 16'; Øyvann (yellow card) 38'; Petersen (yellow card) 71'; Grødem (yellow card) 81'; Ellingsen 90+5' | Stadium: Brann Stadion; Attendance: 16,512; Referee: Ola Hobber Nilsen |

| 29 October 2023 26 | Sandefjord | 1–1 | Brann | Sandefjord |
| 17:00 CET (UTC+1) | Dunsby (yellow card) 48'; Nyenetue 90' | Report | Myhre (yellow card) 14'; Børsting (yellow card) 31'; Soltvedt (yellow card) 48'; Knudsen 85'; Larsen (yellow card) 89' | Stadium: Release Arena; Attendance: 6,598; Referee: Christian Moen |

| 5 November 2023 27 | Brann | 2–1 | Odd | Bergen |
| 17:00 CET (UTC+1) | Myhre 57'; Knudsen (yellow card) 59'; Nilsen 62' | Report | Svendsen (yellow card) 53'; Gjengaar (yellow card) 64'; Tewelde 90+4' | Stadium: Brann Stadion; Attendance: 15,098; Referee: Marius Hansen Grøtta |

| 11 November 2023 28 | Haugesund | 0–2 | Brann | Haugesund |
| 18:00 CET (UTC+1) | Fredriksen (yellow card) 27'; Søderlund (yellow card) 45'; Krygård (yellow card) 64' | Report | Pedersen (yellow card) 6'; Castro 17' (pen.); Crone (yellow card) 29'; Myhre 39' | Stadium: Haugesund Stadion; Attendance: 8,070; Referee: Ola Hobber Nilsen |

| 26 November 2023 29 | Brann | 4–2 | Bodø/Glimt | Bergen |
| 17:00 CET (UTC+1) | Finne 7', 28'; Castro 39', 47'; Crone (yellow card) 90+1' | Report | Gulliksen 53' (yellow card) 60'; Kapskarmo 82' (yellow card) 83' | Stadium: Brann Stadion; Attendance: 16,832; Referee: Svein Oddvar Moen |

| 3 December 2023 30 | Strømsgodset | 3–0 | Brann | Drammen |
| 17:00 CET (UTC+1) | Vilsvik 23'; Leifsson (yellow card) 61'; Stengel 65', 83' | Report | Dyngeland (yellow card) 82' | Stadium: Marienlyst Stadion; Attendance: 5,432; Referee: Ola Hobber Nilsen |

=== Norwegian Football Cup ===
==== 2022 ====
| 12 March 2023 Fourth round | Brann | 3–1 | Haugesund | Bergen |
| 13:00 CET (UTC+1) | Finne 10', 71'; Rasmussen 11'; Pedersen (yellow card) 69'; Blomberg (yellow card) 88' | Report | Søderlund (yellow card) 12'; Christensen (yellow card) 20' (goal) 66'; Therkildsen (yellow card) 73' | Stadium: Åsane Arena; Attendance: 3,033; Referee: Espen Eskås |

| 19 March 2023 Quarter-finals | Brann | 3–0 | Sandefjord | Bergen |
| 20:00 CET (UTC+1) | Myhre 21'; Wolfe 25'; Rasmussen 37' | Report | Pålerud (yellow card) 41'; Berglie (yellow card) 55' | Stadium: Åsane Arena; Attendance: 2,243; Referee: Tom Harald Hagen |

| 26 April 2023 Semi-finals | Stabæk | 0–2 | Brann | Bærum |
| 18:00 CEST (UTC+2) | Geelmuyden (yellow card) 81'; Høgh (yellow card) 84'; Krogstad (yellow card) 86' | Report | Heggebø 20'; Finne 59'; Larsen (yellow card) 84' | Stadium: Nadderud Stadion; Attendance: 4,560; Referee: Rohit Saggi |

| 20 May 2023 Final | Brann | 2–0 | Lillestrøm | Oslo |
| 16:00 CEST (UTC+2) | Blomberg 16'; Finne 62' | Report | Ranger (yellow card) 17'; Vindheim (yellow card) 83' | Stadium: Ullevaal Stadion; Attendance: 25,532; Referee: Tore Hansen |

==== 2023 ====
| 24 May 2023 First round | Frøya | 0–5 | Brann | Bergen |
| 18:00 CEST (UTC+2) | Helland (yellow card) 15'; Stranden (yellow card) 47'; Kvalheim (yellow card) 90+1' | Report | Myrlid 10', 60'; Hjorteseth 55', 72'; Finne 81' | Stadium: Varden Amfi; Attendance: 1,500; Referee: Sondre Brudvik |

| 1 June 2023 Second round | Fjøra | 1–8 | Brann | Sogndalsfjøra |
| 18:00 CEST (UTC+2) | Flo 53' | Report | Crone 9'; Hjorteseth 10'; Knudsen 29'; Castro 32'; Torsvik 56'; Finne 73', 80'; Holten 89' | Stadium: Fosshaugane Campus; Attendance: 1,294; Referee: Jonas Sande Mossestad |

| 7 June 2023 Third round | Aalesund | 3–3 (a.e.t.) (5–6 p) | Brann | Ålesund |
| 18:00 CEST (UTC+2) | Atanga 25'; Segberg (yellow card) 31'; Karlsbakk 43' (pen.), 97'; Ødemarksbakken (yellow card) 77'; Diop (yellow card) 103'; Haram (yellow card) 113' | Report; Penalties | Crone 37'; Kristiansen (yellow card) 42'; Pedersen 88'; Blomberg 101'; Myhre (yellow card) 110'; Rasmussen (yellow card) 114' | Stadium: Color Line Stadion; Attendance: 1,400; Referee: Mohammad Usman Aslam |
| | Penalties |
| | Segberg (penalty scored); Karlsbakk (penalty missed); Lunding (penalty scored); Hopland (penalty scored); Juel (penalty missed); Ødemarksbakken (penalty scored); Kolskogen (penalty scored); Diop (penalty missed) | | (penalty scored) Finne; (penalty missed) Blomberg; (penalty scored) Myhre; (penalty scored) Myrlid; (penalty missed) Rasmussen; (penalty scored) Kristiansen; (penalty scored) Wolfe; (penalty scored) Hjorteseth |

| 28 June 2023 Fourth round | Brattvåg | 1–7 | Brann | Brattvåg |
| 18:00 CEST (UTC+2) | Tattum 29' (yellow card) 65'; Sveinsson (yellow card) 61' | Report | Nilsen 10'; Finne 14', 38', 53', 55'; Myhre 34'; Hagen 68' | Stadium: Brattvåg gras Attendance: 1,445; Referee: Svein Tore Sinnes |

| 12 July 2023 Quarter-finals | Vålerenga | 3–2 | Brann | Oslo |
| 20:00 CEST (UTC+2) | Jatta 13'; Riisnæs (yellow card) 43'; Ofkir 60', 66'; Eng (yellow card) 90+2' | Report | Larsen 5'; Finne 6'; Pedersen (red card) 88' | Stadium: Intility Arena; Attendance: 7,833; Referee: Svein Oddvar Moen |

=== UEFA Europa Conference League ===
==== Third qualifying round ====
The draw for the third qualifying round was held on 24 July 2023.

| 10 August 2023 First leg | Arouca (Portugal) | 2–1 | (Norway) Brann | Arouca, Portugal |
| 19:00 WEST (UTC+1) | Mújica 23'; Galović (yellow card) 67'; González 74'; Busquets (yellow card) 85' | Report | Warming (yellow card) 71' (goal) 80'; Pedersen (yellow card) 82' | Stadium: Estádio Municipal; Attendance: 2,388; Referee: David Munro (Scotland) |

| 17 August 2023 Second leg | Brann (Norway) | 3–1 (4–3 agg.) | (Portugal) Arouca | Bergen |
| 19:00 CEST (UTC+2) | Myhre 6'; Pedersen (yellow card) 38'; Knudsen 42' (yellow card) 65'; Crone (yellow card) 50'; Finne 45' | Report | Galović (yellow card) 27' (yellow-red card) 90+2'; Sylla 57'; Simão (yellow card) 57'; Santos (yellow card) 90+3'; Arruabarrena (yellow card) 90+3' | Stadium: Brann Stadion; Attendance: 14,119; Referee: Bram Van Driessche (Belgium) |

==== Play-off round ====
The draw for the play-off round was held on 7 August 2023.

| 24 August 2023 First leg | AZ (Netherlands) | 1–1 | (Norway) Brann | Alkmaar, Netherlands |
| 20:45 CEST (UTC+2) | Chatzidiakos 71' | Report | Castro (yellow card) 31' (goal) 59'; Nilsen (yellow card) 45+2'; Knudsen (yellow card) 65' | Stadium: AFAS Stadion; Attendance: 10,888; Referee: Evangelos Manouchos (Greece) |

| 31 August 2023 Second leg | Brann (Norway) | 3–3 (a.e.t.) (4–4 agg.) (5–6 p) | (Netherlands) AZ | Bergen |
| 19:00 CEST (UTC+2) | Nilsen (yellow card) 39'; Knudsen 45+1' (yellow card) 54'; Soltvedt 66'; Larsen 82'; Børsting (yellow card) 90+6'; Myhre (red card) 120+1' | Report | Lahdo 12' (yellow card) 77'; Pavlidis (yellow card) 20'; Mijnans 29'; Van Bommel 50'; D. de Wit (yellow card) 58'; Wolfe (yellow card) 65'; Ryan (yellow card) 75'; Sugawara (yellow card) 81' | Stadium: Brann Stadion; Attendance: 14,355; Referee: Gergő Bogár (Hungary) |
| | Penalties |
| | Finne (penalty scored); Heltne Nilsen (penalty scored); Heggebø (penalty scored); Simba (penalty scored); Soltvedt (penalty scored); Børsting (penalty missed) | | (penalty scored) De Wit; (penalty scored) Sugawara; (penalty scored) Odgaard; (penalty scored) Mijnans; (penalty scored) Mihailovic; (penalty scored) Penetra |
