= Moonga Simba =

Swedish footballer

Personal information
- Full name: Moonga Aluta Simba
- Date of birth: 8 May 2000 (age 26)
- Place of birth: Stockholm, Sweden
- Height: 1.83 m (6 ft 0 in)
- Position: Midfielder

Team information
- Current team: Velež Mostar

Youth career
- –2016: Brommapojkarna

Senior career*
Years	Team	Apps	(Gls)
2016–2017	Håbo	33	(3)
2018	Karlberg	24	(4)
2019–2020	Sandviken	37	(1)
2020	Västerås	14	(2)
2021–2024	Brann	28	(1)
2022	→ Värnamo (loan)	11	(0)
2023	→ GIF Sundsvall (loan)	14	(3)
2025–2026	Sandviken	30	(6)
2026	Hermannstadt	10	(0)
2026–	Velež Mostar	0	(0)
- * Club domestic league appearances and goals as of 11 May 2026

Moonga Aluta Simba (born 8 May 2000) is a Swedish professional footballer who plays as a midfielder for Bosnian Premier League club Velež Mostar.

== Club career ==
On 18 February 2021, Simba signed for Eliteserien club Brann on a three-year contract, being unable to join up with his new team until April due to COVID-19 restrictions.

On 30 March 2022, Simba joined Värnamo on a season-long loan. In February 2023, he joined GIF Sundsvall on loan for the 2023 season.

In January 2025, Simba returned to Sandvikens IF, signing a deal until the end of 2026.

== Personal life ==
Born in Sweden, Simba is of Congo-Brazzaville descent. His brother Charles, Heradi and Mtaka are also footballers in Sweden.

== Career statistics ==
As of 11 May 2026

Appearances and goals by club, season and competition
Club	Season	League			National cup (Note: Includes Svenska Cupen, Norwegian Cup)		Europe		Other		Total	
Club	Season	Division	Apps	Goals	Apps	Goals	Apps	Goals	Apps	Goals	Apps	Goals
Håbo	2016	Division 2	8	0	0	0	—		—		8	0
Håbo	2017	Division 2	25	3	0	0	—		—		25	3
Håbo	Total		33	3	0	0	—		—		33	3
Karlberg	2018	Division 2	24	4	2	1	—		—		26	5
Sandviken	2019	Ettan	27	1	2	0	—		—		29	1
Sandviken	2020	Ettan	10	0	3	0	—		—		13	0
Sandviken	Total		37	1	5	0	—		—		42	1
Västerås	2020	Superettan	14	2	1	2	—		—		15	4
Brann	2021	Eliteserien	20	1	3	1	—		1 (Note: Appearance in Eliteserien play-offs)	0	24	2
Brann	2022	1. divisjon	0	0	1	0	—		—		1	0
Brann	2023	Eliteserien	8	0	0	0	4 (Note: Appearances in UEFA Europa Conference League)	0	—		12	0
Brann	2024	Eliteserien	0	0	1	0	0	0	—		1	0
Brann	Total		28	1	5	1	4	0	1	0	38	2
Värnamo (loan)	2022	Allsvenskan	11	0	0	0	—		—		11	0
GIF Sundsvall (loan)	2023	Superettan	14	3	1	0	—		—		15	3
Sandviken	2025	Superettan	30	6	4	0	—		—		34	6
Hermannstadt	2025–26	Liga I	10	0	2	1	—		—		12	1
Velež Mostar	2026–27	Bosnian Premier League	0	0	0	0	—		—		0	0
Career total			201	20	20	5	4	0	1	0	226	25
