= Ruben Kristiansen =

Norwegian footballer (born 1988)

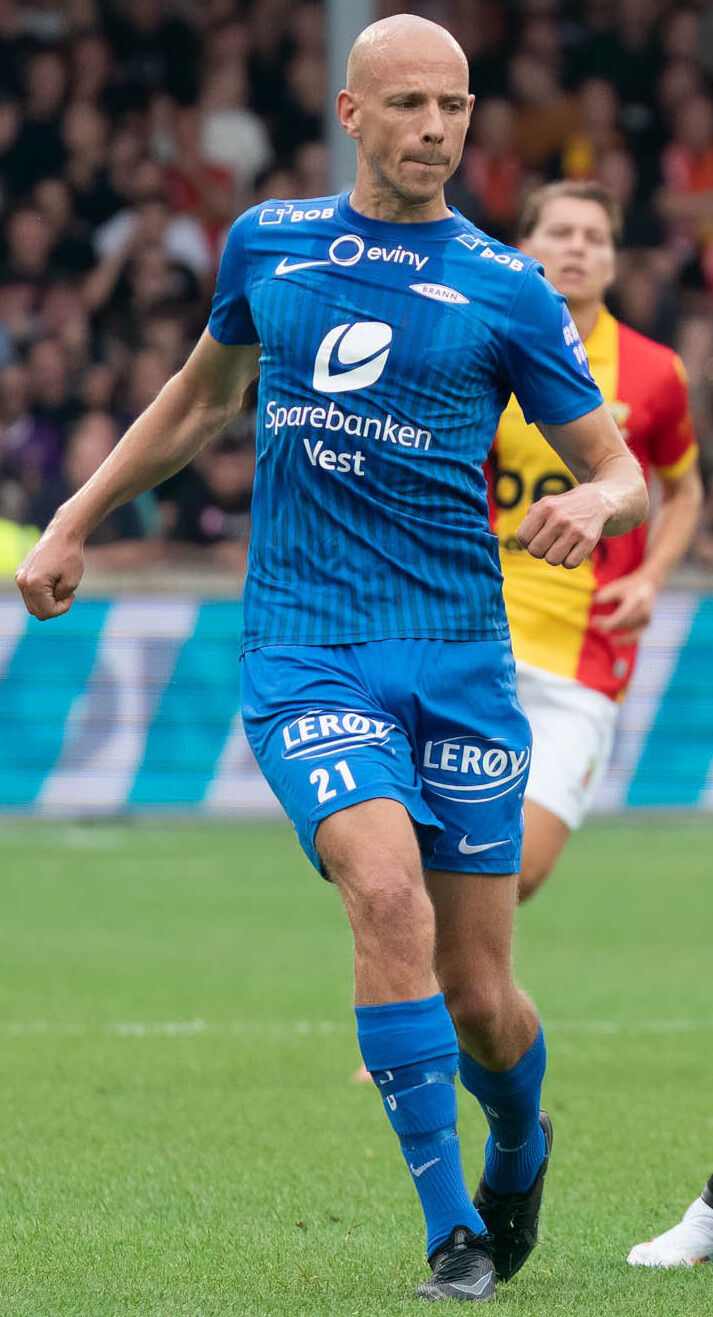
- Kristiansen with Brann in 2024

Personal information
- Date of birth: 20 February 1988 (age 38)
- Place of birth: Nordreisa, Norway
- Height: 1.83 m (6 ft 0 in)
- Position: Defender

Youth career
- Nordreisa

Senior career*
| Years | Team | Apps | (Gls) |
| 2006 | Nordreisa | 1 | (0) |
| 2007–2009 | Skjervøy | 1 | (0) |
| 2010–2011 | Tromsdalen | 43 | (5) |
| 2012 | Tromsø 2 | 7 | (0) |
| 2012–2014 | Tromsø | 43 | (1) |
| 2014–2015 | Vålerenga | 42 | (0) |
| 2015–2024 | Brann | 228 | (4) |
| 2025 | Tromsø | 8 | (0) |
| 2026 | Tromsdalen | 4 | (0) |
| Total | | 377 | (10) |

International career
| 2012 | Norway U23 | 1 | (0) |
| 2013–2014 | Norway | 4 | (0) |
- * Club domestic league appearances and goals

Ruben Kristiansen (born 20 February 1988) is a romer Norwegian professional footballer who played as a defender. Kristiansen has played at the highest level in Norway for three clubs, Tromsø, Vålerenga and Brann.

== Career ==
=== Early years ===
Kristiansen hails from Nordreisa Municipality. He started his career at local club Nordreisa, before moving on to play for Skjervøy, and later Tromsdalen.

=== Tromsø ===
In late 2011 Kristiansen signed a three-year contract with Eliteserien club Tromsø.

=== Vålerenga ===
He signed for Vålerenga in March 2014.

=== Brann ===
After two seasons at Vålerenga, Kristiansen joined fellow Eliteserien side Brann in 2015, helping them reach promotion at the end of the season.

He subsequently signed several new contracts with the club, stretching all the way through the 2024 season.

=== Return to Tromsø ===
In October 2024 Brann announced that Kristiansen would not be offered a contract extension after the season was finished. The following December, his former club Tromsø confirmed that they had signed Kristiansen on a one-year contract.

After only eight appearances in the league, most of them off the bench, it was announced that Kristiansen would not renew his contract with the club, and that he would depart after only one season.

=== Return to Tromsdalen ===
On 8 April 2026, after three months without a club, Kristiansen signed a one-year amateur contract with his former club Tromsdalen.

On 19 October 2026, he announced that he had retired from football. He played his last game in May 2026.

== International career ==
Kristiansen made one appearance for Norway's U23 team in 2012 against Estonia's U23 team, where they lost 2-0.

He made his international senior debut for Norway against South Africa in a friendly game in January 2013.

== Career statistics ==
=== Club ===
As of 14 May 2026

| Club | Season | Division | League | | National Cup | | Europe | | Other | | Total | |
| Club | Season | Division | Apps | Goals | Apps | Goals | Apps | Goals | Apps | Goals | Apps | Goals |
|---|---|---|---|---|---|---|---|---|---|---|---|---|
| Tromsdalen | 2010 | 1. divisjon | 19 | 2 | 3 | 0 | — | | — | | 22 | 2 |
| Tromsdalen | 2011 | 2. divisjon | 24 | 3 | 1 | 0 | — | | — | | 25 | 3 |
| Tromsdalen | Total | | 43 | 5 | 4 | 0 | — | | — | | 47 | 5 |
| Tromsø 2 | 2012 | 2. divisjon | 7 | 0 | — | | — | | — | | 7 | 0 |
| Tromsø | 2012 | Eliteserien | 16 | 1 | 6 | 0 | 6 (Note: Appearances in UEFA Europa League) | 0 | — | | 28 | 1 |
| Tromsø | 2013 | Eliteserien | 27 | 0 | 2 | 0 | 13 | 0 | — | | 42 | 0 |
| Tromsø | Total | | 43 | 1 | 8 | 0 | 19 | 0 | — | | 70 | 1 |
| Vålerenga | 2014 | Eliteserien | 26 | 0 | 2 | 0 | — | | — | | 28 | 0 |
| Vålerenga | 2015 | Eliteserien | 16 | 0 | 1 | 0 | — | | — | | 17 | 0 |
| Vålerenga | Total | | 42 | 0 | 3 | 0 | — | | — | | 45 | 0 |
| Brann | 2015 | 1. divisjon | 12 | 2 | 0 | 0 | — | | — | | 12 | 2 |
| Brann | 2016 | Eliteserien | 28 | 0 | 0 | 0 | — | | — | | 28 | 0 |
| Brann | 2017 | Eliteserien | 28 | 1 | 2 | 0 | 2 | 0 | 1 (Note: Appearance in Mesterfinalen) | 0 | 33 | 1 |
| Brann | 2018 | Eliteserien | 13 | 0 | 0 | 0 | — | | — | | 13 | 0 |
| Brann | 2019 | Eliteserien | 28 | 0 | 0 | 0 | 2 | 0 | — | | 30 | 0 |
| Brann | 2020 | Eliteserien | 21 | 0 | — | | — | | — | | 21 | 0 |
| Brann | 2021 | Eliteserien | 26 | 1 | 2 | 0 | — | | — | | 28 | 1 |
| Brann | 2022 | 1. divisjon | 30 | 0 | 2 | 0 | — | | — | | 32 | 0 |
| Brann | 2023 | Eliteserien | 13 | 0 | 5 | 0 | 4 (Note: Appearances in UEFA Europa Conference League) | 0 | — | | 22 | 0 |
| Brann | 2024 | Eliteserien | 29 | 0 | 1 | 0 | 6 | 0 | — | | 36 | 0 |
| Brann | Total | | 228 | 4 | 12 | 0 | 14 | 0 | 1 | 0 | 255 | 4 |
| Tromsø | 2025 | Eliteserien | 8 | 0 | 3 | 0 | — | | — | | 11 | 0 |
| Tromsdalen | 2026 | Norwegian Second Division | 4 | 0 | 0 | 0 | — | | 0 | 0 | 4 | 0 |
| Career Total | | | 376 | 10 | 30 | 0 | 33 | 0 | 1 | 0 | 440 | 10 |

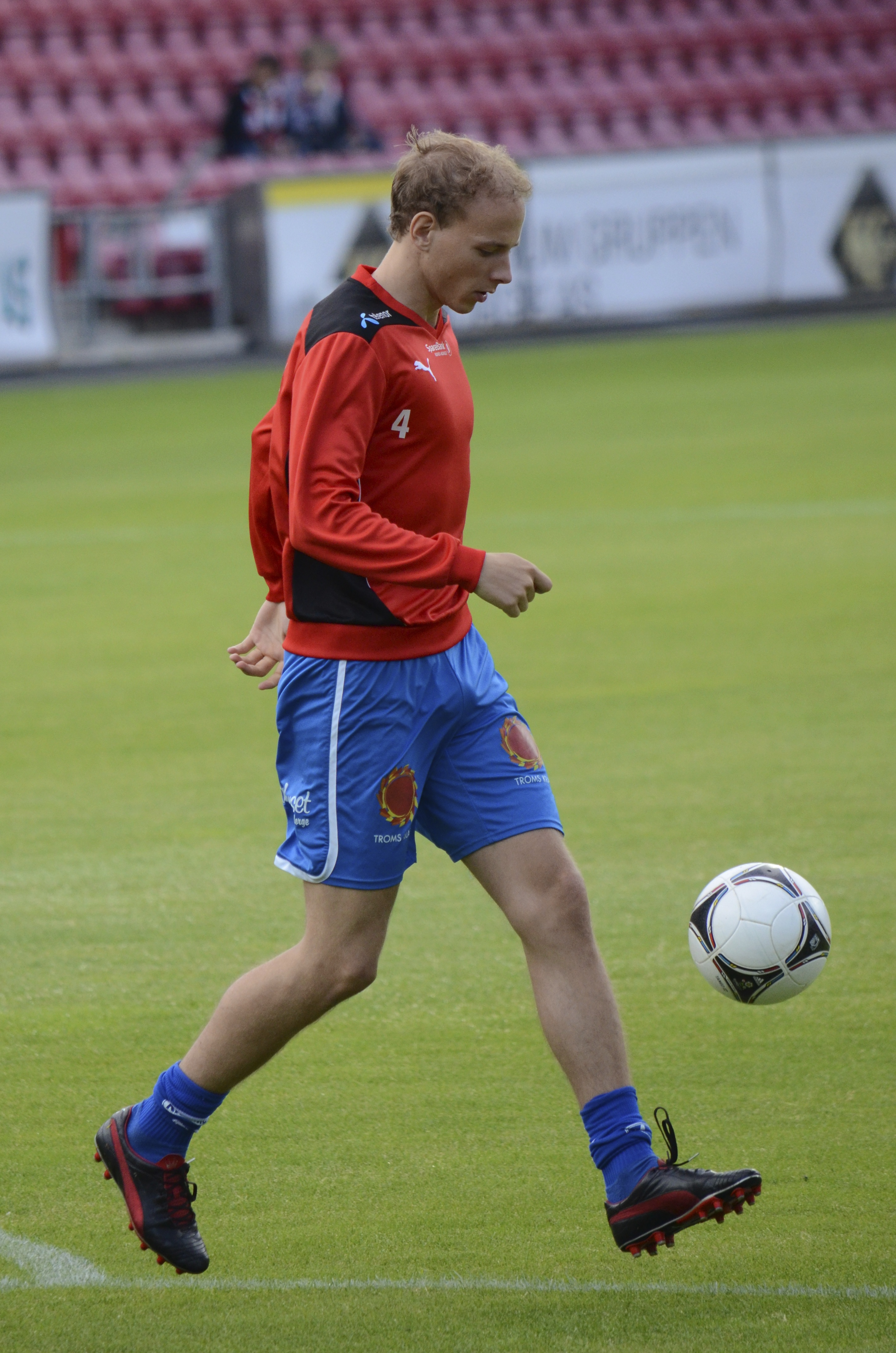
Kristiansen in 2012.

=== International ===
As of match played 18 January 2014

Appearances and goals by national team and year
| National team | Year | Apps | Goals |
|---|---|---|---|
| Norway | 2013 | 3 | 0 |
| Norway | 2014 | 1 | 0 |
| Total | | 4 | 0 |

== Honours ==
Tromsø

- Norwegian Cup runner-up: 2012

Brann

- Norwegian First Division: 2022
- Norwegian Football Cup: 2022
- Mesterfinalen runner-up: 2017
