= 2012 Tromsø IL season =

Tromsø
2012 season
- Chairman: Helge Kræmer
- Manager: Per Mathias Høgmo
- Stadium: Alfheim Stadion
- Tippeligaen: 4th
- Norwegian Cup: Runners Up vs Hødd
- Europa League: Play Off Round vs Partizan
- Top goalscorer: League: Zdeněk Ondrášek (14); All: Zdeněk Ondrášek (18)
- Highest home attendance: 5,722 vs Molde; 26 September 2012
- Lowest home attendance: 1,156 vs Tromsdalen; 20 June 2012
- Average home league attendance: 3,878
Home colours	Away colours

The 2012 season was Tromsø's 10th consecutive year in Tippeligaen, and their 26th season in the top flight of Norwegian football. It was Per Mathias Høgmo's third and final season as the club's manager. Tromsø participated in the Tippeligaen finishing 4th, the 2012 Norwegian Football Cup where they were beaten in the final by Hødd. They also tool part in the 2012–13 UEFA Europa League, entering at the Second qualifying round stage against Olimpija Ljubljana before being eliminated by Partizan on away goals at the Play Off stage.

== Squad ==
Note: Flags indicate national team as defined under FIFA eligibility rules; some limited exceptions apply. Players may hold more than one non-FIFA nationality.

No.	Pos.	Nation	Player
1	GK	SWE	Marcus Sahlman
2	MF	SEN	Kara Mbodj
3	DF	SWE	Fredrik Björck
4	DF	NOR	Ruben Kristiansen
7	DF	FIN	Miika Koppinen (captain)
9	FW	NOR	Steffen Nystrøm
10	MF	NOR	Thomas Drage
11	MF	NOR	Ruben Yttergård Jenssen
12	GK	NOR	Steffen Andreassen
13	FW	CZE	Zdeněk Ondrášek
14	DF	NOR	Hans Norbye

No.	Pos.	Nation	Player
15	MF	NOR	Magnus Andersen
16	DF	NOR	Hans Åge Yndestad
17	MF	NOR	Remi Johansen
18	MF	NOR	Thomas Kind Bendiksen
19	MF	NOR	William Frantzen
22	DF	SEN	Saliou Ciss
25	FW	NOR	Ole Martin Årst
27	GK	SWE	Benny Lekström
28	FW	SUI	Aleksandar Prijović (on loan from Sion)
35	GK	FIN	Henri Sillanpää (on loan from GAIS)

== Transfers ==
=== Winter ===
In: Note: Flags indicate national team as defined under FIFA eligibility rules; some limited exceptions apply. Players may hold more than one non-FIFA nationality.

No.	Pos.	Nation	Player
4	DF	NOR	Ruben Kristiansen (from (Norway) Tromsdalen)
13	FW	CZE	Zdeněk Ondrášek (loan from (Czech Republic) České Budějovice)
18	MF	NOR	Thomas Kind Bendiksen (from (Scotland) Rangers)
25	FW	NOR	Ole Martin Årst (from (Norway) Start)
28	FW	SWE	Benny Lekström (from (Norway) Mjølner)

Out: Note: Flags indicate national team as defined under FIFA eligibility rules; some limited exceptions apply. Players may hold more than one non-FIFA nationality.

No.	Pos.	Nation	Player
—	MF	NOR	Mads Reginiussen (from (Norway) Ranheim)

=== Summer ===
In: Note: Flags indicate national team as defined under FIFA eligibility rules; some limited exceptions apply. Players may hold more than one non-FIFA nationality.

No.	Pos.	Nation	Player
13	FW	CZE	Zdeněk Ondrášek (from (Czech Republic) České Budějovice, previously on loan)
28	FW	SUI	Aleksandar Prijović (loan from (Switzerland) Sion)
35	GK	FIN	Henri Sillanpää (loan from (Sweden) GAIS)

Out: Note: Flags indicate national team as defined under FIFA eligibility rules; some limited exceptions apply. Players may hold more than one non-FIFA nationality.

No.	Pos.	Nation	Player
20	FW	NOR	Mohammed Ahamed (to (Norway) Tromsdalen)
21	FW	NOR	Vegard Lysvoll (on loan to (Norway) Tromsdalen)

== Competitions ==
=== Tippeligaen ===
==== Results summary ====
Overall								Home						Away					
Pld	W	D	L	GF	GA	GD	Pts	W	D	L	GF	GA	GD	W	D	L	GF	GA	GD
30	14	7	9	45	32	+13	49	10	4	1	32	8	+24	4	3	8	13	24	−11

==== Results by round ====
Round	1	2	3	4	5	6	7	8	9	10	11	12	13	14	15	16	17	18	19	20	21	22	23	24	25	26	27	28	29	30
Ground	H	A	H	H	A	H	A	H	A	H	A	H	A	H	A	H	A	H	A	A	H	A	H	A	H	A	H	A	A	H
Result	W	D	W	W	L	D	D	W	L	W	L	W	D	D	L	D	L	W	W	W	W	L	W	W	W	L	D	L	W	L
Position	5	4	1	1	2	5	6	4	5	4	5	4	5	5	5	7	7	9	9	9	4	4	5	4	4	4	4	4	4	4

Source: see below
A = Away; H = Home; W = Win; D = Draw; L = Loss

==== Results ====
25 March 2012 1	Tromsø	1–0	Fredrikstad	Tromsø
18:00 CET (UTC+1)	Ondrášek 62'	Summary		Stadium: Alfheim Stadion; Attendance: 2,919; Referee: Svein Erik Edvartsen

2 April 2012 2	Aalesund	0–0	Tromsø	Ålesund
19:00 CEST (UTC+2)		Summary		Stadium: Color Line Stadion; Attendance: 9,459; Referee: Dag Vidar Hafsås

9 April 2012 3	Tromsø	3–0	Stabæk	Tromsø
18:00 CEST (UTC+2)	Andersen 19'; Mbodj 45'; Norbye 76'	Summary		Stadium: Alfheim Stadion; Attendance: 3,903; Referee: Per Ivar Staberg

15 April 2012 4	Tromsø	3–1	Sandnes Ulf	Tromsø
18:00 CEST (UTC+2)	Ondrášek 8' (pen.); Drage 18' (pen.); Aanestad 37' (o.g.)	Summary	Torsteinbø 74'; Frejd (yellow card) 17' (yellow-red card) 90+4'	Stadium: Alfheim Stadion; Attendance: 4,387; Referee: Per Ivar Staberg

22 April 2012 5	Rosenborg	3–0	Tromsø	Trondheim
20:00 CEST (UTC+2)	Henriksen 64'; Dorsin 72'; Svensson 90+3'	Summary		Stadium: Lerkendal Stadion; Attendance: 12,575; Referee: Tommy Skjerven

28 April 2012 6	Tromsø	0–0	Hønefoss	Tromsø
18:00 CEST (UTC+2)		Summary		Stadium: Alfheim Stadion; Attendance: 4,206; Referee: Anders Johansen

5 May 2012 7	Odd Grenland	2–2	Tromsø	Skien
18:00 CEST (UTC+2)	Johnsen 76'; Brenne 88'	Summary	Mbodj 11'; Norbye 12'	Stadium: Skagerak Arena; Attendance: 4,603; Referee: Tom Harald Hagen

12 May 2012 8	Tromsø	3–1	Vålerenga	Tromsø
18:00 CEST (UTC+2)	Ondrášek 29'; Andersen 31', 54'	Summary	Fellah 86'	Stadium: Alfheim Stadion; Attendance: 4,846; Referee: Dag Vidar Hafsås

16 May 2012 9	Strømsgodset	2–0	Tromsø	Drammen
18:00 CEST (UTC+2)	Konradsen 2'; Storflor 59'	Summary		Stadium: Marienlyst Stadion; Attendance: 6,390; Referee: Svein Erik Edvartsen

20 May 2012 10	Tromsø	5–1	Viking	Tromsø
18:00 CET (UTC+1)	Johansen 26'; Andersen 42'; Koppinen 45+1'; Nystrøm 75'; Ondrášek 81'	Summary	de Lanlay 86'	Stadium: Alfheim Stadion; Attendance: 3,824; Referee: Kristoffer Helgerud

23 May 2012 11	Molde	3–2	Tromsø	Molde
19:00 CEST (UTC+2)	Berget 51'; Angan 57'; Hovland 69'	Summary	Ondrášek 35'; Mbodj (yellow card) 58' (yellow-red card) 65'; Johansen 90+3'	Stadium: Aker Stadion; Attendance: 9,239; Referee: Tom Harald Hagen

28 May 2012 12	Tromsø	2–0	Brann	Tromsø
19:00 CEST (UTC+2)	Ondrášek 13', 65'; Årst (yellow card) 87'	Summary	Bentley (yellow card) 27'	Stadium: Alfheim Stadion; Attendance: 4,017; Referee: Dag Hafsås

30 June 2012 13	Haugesund	1–1	Tromsø	Haugesund
18:00 CEST (UTC+2)	Đurđić 51'	Summary	Norbye 59'	Stadium: Haugesund Stadion; Attendance: 4,520; Referee: Tommy Skjerven

7 July 2012 14	Tromsø	1–1	Sogndal	Tromsø
20:00 CEST (UTC+2)	Ondrášek 64'	Report	Valsvik 90+3'	Stadium: Alfheim Stadion; Attendance: 3,950; Referee: Trygve Kjensli

13 July 2012 15	Lillestrøm	4–2	Tromsø	Lillestrøm
19:00 CEST (UTC+2)	Moen (yellow card) 45'; Knudtzon 50'; Omoijuanfo 52'; Toindouba 64'; Pálmason 74'	Summary	Norbye 11'; Nystrøm 48'	Stadium: Åråsen Stadion; Attendance: 4,597; Referee: Tom Hagen

29 July 2012 16	Tromsø	1–1	Rosenborg	Tromsø
20:00 CEST (UTC+2)	Ondrášek 69'	Summary	Holm 10'	Stadium: Alfheim Stadion; Attendance: 5,299; Referee: Tom Harald Hagen

5 August 2012 17	Fredrikstad	2–0	Tromsø	Fredrikstad
18:00 CEST (UTC+2)	Srećković 13'; Elyounoussi 57'	Summary		Stadium: Fredrikstad Stadion; Attendance: 6,107; Referee: Ken Henry Johnsen

12 August 2012 18	Tromsø	4–0	Strømsgodset	Tromsø
18:00 CEST (UTC+2)	Kristiansen 28'; Ciss 32'; Drage 44' (pen.); Ondrášek 90+1'	Summary		Stadium: Alfheim Stadion; Attendance: 4,349; Referee: Ola Hobber Nilsen

26 August 2012 19	Hønefoss	0–1	Tromsø	Hønefoss
18:00 CEST (UTC+2)		Summary	Johansen 84'	Stadium: Aka Arena; Attendance: 2,660; Referee: Thorvaldur Arnason

2 September 2012 20	Viking	0–1	Tromsø	Stavanger
18:00 CEST (UTC+2)		Summary	Årst 14'	Stadium: Viking Stadion; Attendance: 10,547; Referee: Ken Henry Johnsen

17 September 2012 21	Tromsø	5–1	Lillestrøm	Tromsø
19:00 CEST (UTC+2)	Björck 23', 57'; Bendiksen 27'; Ondrášek 53', 60'	Summary	Moen 38' (yellow card) 86'	Stadium: Alfheim Stadion; Attendance: 4,085; Referee: Svein Moen

23 September 2012 22	Sogndal	1–0	Tromsø	Sogndalsfjøra
18:00 CEST (UTC+2)	Ciss 18' (o.g.)	Summary		Stadium: Fosshaugane Campus; Attendance: 2,736; Referee: Ken Henry Johnsen

30 September 2012 23	Tromsø	1–0	Aalesund	Tromsø
18:00 CET (UTC+2)	Mbodj 7'	Summary		Stadium: Alfheim Stadion; Attendance: 4,275; Referee: Omar Rafiq

7 October 2012 24	Stabæk	0–1	Tromsø	Bekkestua, Bærum
18:00 CEST (UTC+2)		Summary	Årst 73'	Stadium: Nadderud Stadion; Attendance: 3,365; Referee: Dag Vidar Hafsås

21 October 2012 25	Tromsø	2–0	Haugesund	Tromsø
18:00 CET (UTC+2)	Prijović 58'; Årst 74'	Summary		Stadium: Alfheim Stadion; Attendance: 3,843; Referee: Anders Johansen

28 October 2012 26	Vålerenga	1–0	Tromsø	Oslo
18:00 CET (UTC+1)	Berre 71'	Summary		Stadium: Ullevaal Stadion; Attendance: 8,946; Referee: Per Ivar Staberg

4 November 2012 27	Tromsø	1–1	Molde	Tromsø
18:00 CET (UTC+1)	Prijović 77'	Report	Chima 4'	Stadium: Alfheim Stadion; Attendance: 4,546; Referee: Tom Harald Hagen

7 November 2012 28	Sandnes Ulf	5–1	Tromsø	Sandnes
18:30 CET (UTC+1)	Skjølsvik 25' (pen.); Gytkjær 44' (pen.); Þorsteinsson 56'; Torsteinbø 66'; Helle 75'	Summary	Prijović 90'	Stadium: Sandnes Idrettspark; Attendance: 2,875; Referee: Brage Sandmoen

11 November 2012 29	Brann	0–2	Tromsø	Bergen
18:00 CET (UTC+1)		Summary	Ondrášek 21', 78' (pen.)	Stadium: Brann Stadion; Attendance: 10,777; Referee: Svein Moen

18 November 2012 30	Tromsø	0–1	Odd Grenland	Tromsø
18:00 CET (UTC+1)		Summary	Fevang 42' (pen.)	Stadium: Alfheim Stadion; Attendance: 3,644; Referee: Tore Hansen

==== Table ====
Pos	Team	Pld	W	D	L	GF	GA	GD	Pts	Qualification or relegation
2	Strømsgodset	30	17	7	6	62	40	+22	58	Qualification for the Europa League second qualifying round (Note: Hødd, which played in the 2012 First Division, also qualified for the 2013–14 UEFA Europa League second qualifying round as winners of the 2012 Norwegian Cup.)
3	Rosenborg	30	15	10	5	53	26	+27	55	Qualification for the Europa League first qualifying round (Note: Tromsø qualified for the first qualifying round of the UEFA Europa League via the UEFA Fair Play ranking.)
4	Tromsø	30	14	7	9	45	32	+13	49	Qualification for the Europa League first qualifying round
5	Viking	30	14	7	9	41	36	+5	49	
6	Brann	30	13	3	14	57	50	+7	42	

Source: fotball.no
Rules for classification: 1) points; 2) goal difference; 3) number of goals scored.

=== Norwegian Cup ===
1 May 2012 First Round	Porsanger	0–2	Tromsø	Lakselv
18:00 CEST (UTC+2)		Summary	Nystrøm 36', 53'	Stadium: Lakselv kunstgress Attendance: 599; Referee: Tom Egil Olsen

9 May 2012 Second Round	Stjørdals-Blink	1–2	Tromsø	Stjørdalshalsen
18:00 CEST (UTC+2)	Sisic 84'	Summary	Frantzen 45+2'; Drage 68'	Stadium: Øverlands Minde; Attendance: 1,008; Referee: Kim Rune Borgersen

20 June 2012 Third Round	Tromsø	4–0	Tromsdalen	Tromsø
18:00 CEST (UTC+2)	Jenssen 48'; Ondrášek 62'; Björck 65'; Lysvoll 87'	Summary		Stadium: Alfheim Stadion; Attendance: 1,156; Referee: Trond Ivar Døvle

4 July 2012 Fourth Round	Start	1–1 (a.e.t.) (1–4 p)	Tromsø	Kristiansand
18:00 CEST (UTC+2)	Vikstøl 90'	Summary	Johansen 43'	Stadium: Sør Arena; Attendance: 3,109; Referee: Svein Oddvar Moen
	Penalties
	Vilhjálmsson (penalty missed); Andersen (penalty scored); Asante (penalty missed)		(penalty scored) Bendiksen; (penalty scored) Andersen; (penalty scored) Johansen; (penalty scored) Ciss

19 August 2012 Quarterfinals	Tromsø	1–0	Bodø/Glimt	Tromsø
17:00 CEST (UTC+2)	Ondrášek 23'	Summary		Stadium: Alfheim Stadion; Attendance: 4,499; Referee: Kjetil Sælen

26 September 2012 Semifinals	Tromsø	2–1	Molde	Tromsø
20:00 CEST (UTC+2)	Ondrášek 3'; Årst 72'	Summary	Chukwu 83'	Stadium: Alfheim Stadion; Attendance: 5,722; Referee: Tommy Skjerven

==== Final ====
25 November 2012	Tromsø	1–1 (a.e.t.) (2–4 p)	Hødd	Oslo
13:15 CEST (UTC+2)	Ciss 87'	Report	Sellin 62'	Stadium: Ullevaal Stadion; Attendance: 24,217; Referee: Kjetil Sælen
	Penalties
	Årst (penalty scored); Drage (penalty scored); Johansen (penalty missed); Ciss (penalty missed)		(penalty scored) Latifu; (penalty scored) Nilsen; (penalty scored) Helland; (penalty missed) Sandal; (penalty scored) Rekdal

=== Europa League ===
==== Qualifying phase ====
19 July 2012 2nd qualifying round 1st leg	Olimpija Ljubljana (Slovenia)	0–0	(Norway) Tromsø	Ljubljana, Slovenia
18:00 CEST (UTC+2)		Report		Stadium: Stožice Stadium; Attendance: 2,600; Referee: Fernando Teixeira Vitienes (Spain)

26 July 2012 2nd qualifying round 2nd leg	Tromsø (Norway)	1–0 (a.e.t.) (1–0 agg.)	(Slovenia) Olimpija Ljubljana	Tromsø, Norway
19:00 CEST (UTC+2)	Koppinen 108'	Report	Radujko (red card) 120+1'	Stadium: Alfheim Stadion; Attendance: 2,297; Referee: Robert Małek (Poland)

2 August 2012 3rd qualifying round 1st leg	Tromsø (Norway)	1–1	(Ukraine) Metalurh Donetsk	Tromsø, Norway
19:00 CEST (UTC+2)	Ondrášek 43'	Report	Björck 88' (o.g.)	Stadium: Alfheim Stadion; Attendance: 2,276; Referee: Steven McLean (Scotland)

9 August 2012 3rd qualifying round 2nd leg	Metalurh Donetsk (Ukraine)	0–1 (1–2 agg.)	(Norway) Tromsø	Donetsk, Ukraine
19:00 CEST (UTC+2)		Report	Prijović 9'	Stadium: Metalurh Stadium; Attendance: 2,800; Referee: Aleksei Kulbakov (Belarus)

23 August 2012 Play-off round 1st leg	Tromsø (Norway)	3–2	(Serbia) Partizan	Tromsø, Norway
18:30 CEST (UTC+2)	Prijović 37'; Björck 77'; Mbodj 82'	Report	S. Marković 43'; Mitrović 84'	Stadium: Alfheim Stadion; Attendance: 3,386; Referee: Robert Schörgenhofer (Austria)

30 August 2012 Play-off round 2nd leg	Partizan (Serbia)	1–0 (a3–3 agg.)	(Norway) Tromsø	Belgrade, Serbia
20:45 CEST (UTC+2)	Ivanov 75'	Report		Stadium: Stadion FK Partizan; Attendance: 14,725; Referee: Serge Gumienny (Belgium)

== Squad statistics ==
=== Appearances and goals ===
No.	Pos	Nat	Player	Total		Tippeligaen		Norwegian Football Cup		Europa League	
No.	Pos	Nat	Player	Apps	Goals	Apps	Goals	Apps	Goals	Apps	Goals
1	GK	(Sweden) SWE	Marcus Sahlman	19	0	9+0	0	5+0	0	5+0	0
2	MF	(Senegal) SEN	Kara Mbodj	30	4	21+1	3	4+1	0	3+0	1
3	DF	(Sweden) SWE	Fredrik Björck	42	4	30+0	2	6+0	1	6+0	1
4	DF	(Norway) NOR	Ruben Kristiansen	28	1	13+3	1	5+1	0	5+1	0
7	DF	(Finland) FIN	Miika Koppinen	29	2	17+2	1	4+0	0	6+0	1
9	FW	(Norway) NOR	Steffen Nystrøm	22	4	7+10	2	4+0	2	1+0	0
10	MF	(Norway) NOR	Thomas Drage	43	3	26+4	2	6+1	1	5+1	0
11	MF	(Norway) NOR	Ruben Yttergård Jenssen	41	1	29+0	0	5+1	1	6+0	0
13	FW	(Czech Republic) CZE	Zdeněk Ondrášek	41	18	27+2	14	5+1	3	5+1	1
14	DF	(Norway) NOR	Hans Norbye	38	4	27+1	4	6+0	0	3+1	0
15	MF	(Norway) NOR	Magnus Andersen	42	4	23+7	4	3+3	0	4+2	0
16	DF	(Norway) NOR	Hans Åge Yndestad	28	0	13+9	0	0+1	0	3+2	0
17	MF	(Norway) NOR	Remi Johansen	34	4	13+11	3	5+2	1	2+1	0
18	MF	(Norway) NOR	Thomas Kind Bendiksen	35	1	19+4	1	3+3	0	5+1	0
19	MF	(Norway) NOR	William Frantzen	3	1	0+1	0	1+1	1	0+0	0
22	DF	(Senegal) SEN	Saliou Ciss	33	1	20+3	1	7+0	0	2+1	0
25	FW	(Norway) NOR	Ole Martin Årst	35	4	4+21	3	2+3	1	1+4	0
27	GK	(Sweden) SWE	Benny Lekström	23	0	19+1	0	2+0	0	1+0	0
28	FW	(Switzerland) SUI	Aleksandar Prijović	19	5	11+2	3	3+0	0	3+0	2
35	GK	(Finland) FIN	Henri Sillanpää	2	0	2+0	0	0+0	0	0+0	0
Players away from Tromsø on loan:
21	FW	(Norway) NOR	Vegard Lysvoll	9	1	0+4	0	1+2	1	0+2	0
Players who left Tromsø during the season:
20	FW	(Norway) NOR	Mohammed Ahamed	1	0	0+0	0	0+1	0	0+0	0

=== Goal scorers ===
Place	Position	Nation	Number	Name	Tippeligaen	Norwegian Cup	Europa League	Total
1	FW	(Czech Republic)	13	Zdeněk Ondrášek	14	3	1	18
2	FW	(Switzerland)	28	Aleksandar Prijović	3	0	2	5
3	DF	(Norway)	14	Hans Norbye	4	0	0	4
3	MF	(Norway)	15	Magnus Andersen	4	0	0	4
3	MF	(Senegal)	2	Kara Mbodj	3	0	1	4
3	MF	(Norway)	17	Remi Johansen	3	1	0	4
3	FW	(Norway)	25	Ole Martin Årst	3	1	0	4
3	FW	(Norway)	9	Steffen Nystrøm	2	2	0	4
3	DF	(Sweden)	3	Fredrik Björck	2	1	1	4
10	MF	(Norway)	10	Thomas Drage	2	1	0	3
11	DF	(Finland)	7	Miika Koppinen	1	0	1	2
11	DF	(Senegal)	22	Saliou Ciss	1	1	0	2
13	DF	(Norway)	4	Ruben Kristiansen	1	0	0	1
13	MF	(Norway)	18	Thomas Kind Bendiksen	1	0	0	1
13				Own goal	1	0	0	1
13	MF	(Norway)	11	Ruben Yttergård Jenssen	0	1	0	1
13	MF	(Norway)	19	William Frantzen	0	1	0	1
13	FW	(Norway)	21	Vegard Lysvoll	0	1	0	1
				TOTALS	45	13	6	64

=== Disciplinary record ===
Number	Nation	Position	Name	Tippeligaen		Norwegian Cup		Europa League		Total	
Number	Nation	Position	Name	Yellow card	Red card	Yellow card	Red card	Yellow card	Red card	Yellow card	Red card
2	(Senegal)	MF	Kara Mbodj	8	1	1	0	1	0	10	1
3	(Sweden)	DF	Fredrik Björck	2	0	0	0	1	0	3	0
7	(Finland)	DF	Miika Koppinen	0	0	2	0	0	0	2	0
10	(Norway)	MF	Thomas Drage	1	0	1	0	0	0	2	0
11	(Norway)	MF	Ruben Yttergård Jenssen	1	0	2	0	1	0	4	0
13	(Czech Republic)	FW	Zdeněk Ondrášek	3	0	0	0	0	0	3	0
14	(Norway)	DF	Hans Norbye	3	0	0	0	1	0	4	0
15	(Norway)	MF	Magnus Andersen	1	0	0	0	0	0	1	0
16	(Norway)	DF	Hans Åge Yndestad	2	0	0	0	1	0	3	0
22	(Senegal)	DF	Saliou Ciss	2	0	1	0	1	0	4	0
25	(Norway)	FW	Ole Martin Årst	3	0	0	0	0	0	3	0
27	(Sweden)	GK	Benny Lekström	2	0	0	0	0	0	2	0
			TOTALS	28	1	7	0	6	0	41	1
