= Mathias Rasmussen =

Norwegian footballer (born 1997)

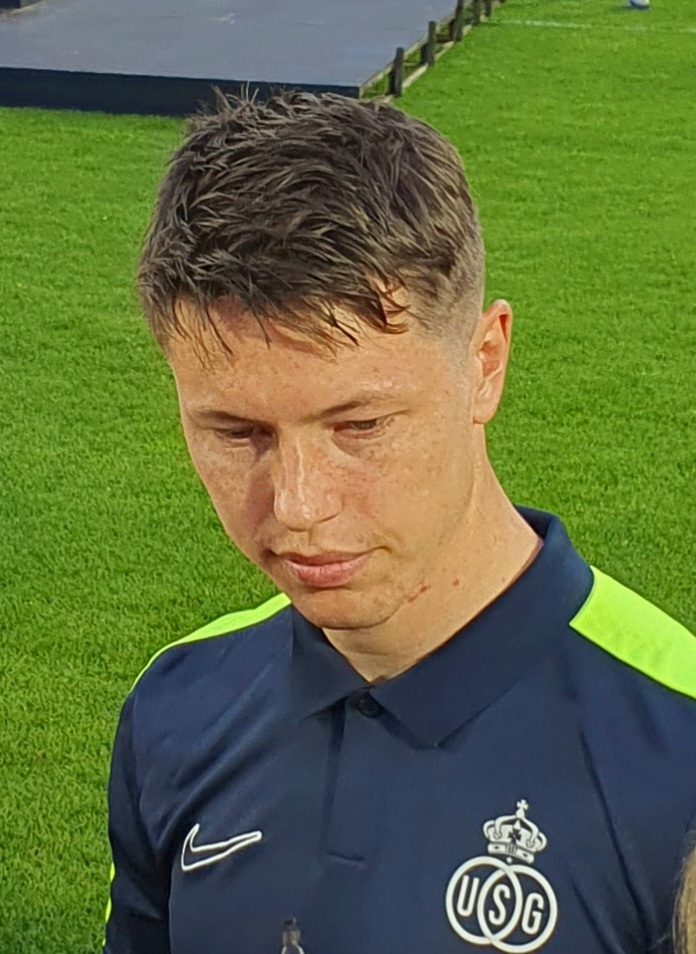
- Rasmussen with Union Saint-Gilloise in 2024

Personal information
- Full name: Mathias Knutsen Rasmussen
- Date of birth: 25 November 1997 (age 28)
- Place of birth: Lyngdal Municipality, Norway
- Height: 1.80 m (5 ft 11 in)
- Position: Midfielder

Team information
- Current team: FC St. Pauli
- Number: 20

Senior career*
Years	Team	Apps	(Gls)
2013	Lyngdal	5	(0)
2014–2016	Start	27	(2)
2016–2020	Nordsjælland	95	(8)
2020–2023	Brann	75	(17)
2023–2026	Union Saint-Gilloise	76	(5)
2026–	FC St. Pauli	22	(0)

International career^{‡}
2014	Norway U17	3	(2)
2015	Norway U18	6	(1)
2016	Norway U19	3	(3)
2017	Norway U21	2	(0)
- * Club domestic league appearances and goals as of 23 October 2026 ‡ National team caps and goals as of 1 September 2017

Mathias Knutsen Rasmussen (born 25 November 1997) is a Norwegian professional footballer who plays as a midfielder for 2. Bundesliga club FC St. Pauli.

== Career ==
After previously playing for the club Lyngdal, he came to IK Start in 2014.

On 15 July 2016, Rasmussen signed for Danish Superliga side Nordsjælland.

On 10 October 2020, Rasmussen signed a three-year contract with Brann. After a rocky start to his Brann career, Rasmussen became one of Branns most important players throughout his time at the club. After scoring 15 goals and making 10 assists in 28 matches in the 2022-season, he was awarded with the Player of the Year Award in the 2022 Norwegian First Division.

On 27 June 2023, with six months remaining on his contract with Brann, Rasmussen signed a four-year contract with the Belgian club Royale Union Saint-Gilloise. The sum paid was reported to be around €1,200,000.

On 24 January 2026, Rasmussen signed with German club FC St. Pauli.

== Career statistics ==
As of match played 23 October 2026

Appearances and goals by club, season and competition
Club	Season	League			National cup (Note: Includes Norwegian Football Cup, Danish Cup, Belgian Cup)		Europe		Other		Total	
Club	Season	Division	Apps	Goals	Apps	Goals	Apps	Goals	Apps	Goals	Apps	Goals
Lyngdal	2013	Norwegian Third Division	5	0	1	0	–		–		6	0
Start	2014	Tippeligaen	1	0	0	0	–		–		1	0
Start	2015	Tippeligaen	11	0	0	0	–		–		11	0
Start	2016	Tippeligaen	15	2	3	1	–		–		18	3
Start	Total		27	2	3	1	–		–		30	3
Nordsjælland	2016–17	Danish Superliga	13	1	0	0	–		–		13	1
Nordsjælland	2017–18	Danish Superliga	34	4	1	0	–		–		35	4
Nordsjælland	2018–19	Danish Superliga	31	0	1	0	4 (Note: Appearances in UEFA Europa League)	1	–		36	1
Nordsjælland	2019–20	Danish Superliga	17	3	1	1	–		–		18	4
Nordsjælland	Total		95	8	3	1	4	1	–		102	10
Brann	2020	Eliteserien	8	0	0	0	–		–		8	0
Brann	2021	Eliteserien	27	2	4	1	–		–		31	3
Brann	2022	Norwegian First Division	28	15	6	2	–		–		34	17
Brann	2023	Eliteserien	12	0	2	0	–		–		14	0
Brann	Total		75	17	12	3	–		–		87	20
Union SG	2023–24	Belgian Pro League	36	2	6	1	11 (Note: Seven appearances in UEFA Europa League, four appearances and two goals in UEFA Europa Conference League)	2	–		53	5
Union SG	2024–25	Belgian Pro League	24	1	1	0	10 (Note: Two appearances in UEFA Champions League, eight appearances in UEFA Europa League)	0	1 (Note: Appearance in Belgian Super Cup)	0	36	1
Union SG	2025–26	Belgian Pro League	16	2	3	0	5 (Note: Appearances in UEFA Champions League)	0	0	0	24	2
Union SG	Total		76	5	10	1	26	2	1	0	113	8
FC St. Pauli	2025–26	Bundesliga	13	0	1	0	–		–		14	0
FC St. Pauli	2026–27	2. Bundesliga	9	0	1	0	–		–		10	0
FC St. Pauli	Total		22	0	2	0	–		–		24	0
Career total			300	32	30	6	30	3	1	0	361	41

== Honours ==
Union SG

- Belgian Pro League: 2024–25
- Belgian Cup: 2023–24
- Belgian Super Cup: 2024

Individual

- Norwegian First Division Player of the Month: June 2022
- Norwegian First Division Player of the Year: 2022
