= Ole Didrik Blomberg =

Norwegian footballer (born 2000)

Personal information
- Date of birth: 12 June 2000 (age 26)
- Place of birth: Bergen, Norway
- Height: 1.77 m (5 ft 10 in)
- Position: Right winger

Team information
- Current team: Bodø/Glimt
- Number: 11

Youth career
- –2016: Gneist

Senior career*
Years	Team	Apps	(Gls)
2016–2018	Gneist	13	(9)
2019–2020	Åsane	38	(2)
2020–2024	Brann	92	(9)
2025–	Bodø/Glimt	45	(15)
- * Club domestic league appearances and goals as of 20 November 2026

Ole Didrik Blomberg (born 12 June 2000) is a Norwegian professional footballer who plays as a Winger for Bodø/Glimt.

== Career ==
Hailing from Bergen, he played for Gneist in the 3. divisjon and 4. divisjon before being picked up by Åsane. Winning promotion from the 2019 2. divisjon, he also performed well in the 2020 1. divisjon and was bought by city greats Brann. He made his Eliteserien debut in October 2020 against Molde.

On 13 January 2025, Brann confirmed that Blomberg had been sold to fellow Eliteserien side Bodø/Glimt. The transfer was reported to be worth 15 million Norwegian kroner.

== Career statistics ==
As of match played 20 November 2026

Appearances and goals by club, season and competition
Club	Season	League			Norwegian Cup		Europe		Other		Total	
Club	Season	Division	Apps	Goals	Apps	Goals	Apps	Goals	Apps	Goals	Apps	Goals
Gneist	2016	3. divisjon	2	0	0	0	—		—		2	0
Gneist	2017	4. divisjon	5	2	1	0	—		—		6	2
Gneist	2018	4. divisjon	6	7	0	0	—		—		6	7
Gneist	Total		13	9	1	0	—		—		14	9
Åsane	2019	2. divisjon	23	1	0	0	—		4 (Note: Appearances in the 2. divisjon promotional play-offs)	0	27	1
Åsane	2020	1. divisjon	15	1	—		—		—		15	1
Åsane	Total		38	2	0	0	—		4	0	42	2
Brann	2020	Eliteserien	8	0	—		—		—		8	0
Brann	2021	Eliteserien	15	0	3	0	—		1 (Note: Appearance in the Eliteserien play-offs)	0	19	0
Brann	2022	1. divisjon	27	5	3	1	—		—		30	6
Brann	2023	Eliteserien	17	1	7	2	0	0	—		24	3
Brann	2024	Eliteserien	25	3	3	1	6 (Note: Appearances in UEFA Conference League)	0	—		34	4
Brann	Total		92	9	16	4	6	0	1	0	115	13
Bodø/Glimt	2025	Eliteserien	18	7	2	0	12 (Note: Appearances in UEFA Europa League and UEFA Champions League)	1	0	0	32	8
Bodø/Glimt	2026	Eliteserien	27	8	4	0	14 (Note: Appearances in UEFA Champions League)	3	0	0	45	11
Bodø/Glimt	Total		45	15	6	0	26	4	0	0	87	19
Career total			188	35	23	4	32	4	5	0	248	43

== Honours ==
Brann

- 1. divisjon: 2022
- Norwegian Cup: 2022

Bodø/Glimt

- Norwegian Football Cup: 2025–26
