= Niklas Jensen Wassberg =

Norwegian footballer (born 2004)

Personal information
- Full name: Niklas Jensen Wassberg
- Date of birth: 12 June 2004 (age 22)
- Place of birth: Bergen, Norway
- Height: 1.81 m (5 ft 11 in)
- Position: Attacking midfielder

Team information
- Current team: Brann
- Number: 25

Youth career
- –2020: Fyllingsdalen

Senior career*
Years	Team	Apps	(Gls)
2021–	Brann	62	(6)
2021–2023	Brann 2	8	(0)

International career^{‡}
2021	Norway U17	3	(0)
2021–2022	Norway U18	7	(0)
2022–2023	Norway U19	8	(1)
2026–	Norway U21	1	(0)
- * Club domestic league appearances and goals as of 9 October 2026 ‡ National team caps and goals as of 17 November 2026

Niklas Jensen Wassberg (born 12 June 2004) is a Norwegian professional footballer who plays for Brann.

== Career ==
He played youth football for FK Fyllingsdalen before joining SK Brann ahead of the 2020 season. While the original intention was for him to start his senior career on loan at Fyllingsdalen, he was instead given a senior contract in Brann, and made his Eliteserien debut in May 2021 against Molde.

== International career ==
Wassberg has been capped for the Norwegian U17, U18 and U19 teams.

== Personal life ==
Niklas Jensen Wassberg is a son of Roy Wassberg and maternal grandson of Roald Jensen.

== Career statistics ==
As of 15 October 2026

Appearances and goals by club, season and competition
Club	Season	League			National Cup		Europe		Other		Total	
Club	Season	Division	Apps	Goals	Apps	Goals	Apps	Goals	Apps	Goals	Apps	Goals
Brann	2021	Eliteserien	9	1	4	0	—		1 (Note: Appearance in Eliteserien play-offs)	0	14	1
Brann	2022	1. divisjon	18	3	6	1	—		—		24	4
Brann	2023	Eliteserien	16	2	3	0	1 (Note: Appearances in UEFA Conference League)	0	—		19	3
Brann	2024	Eliteserien	3	0	1	0	0	0	—		4	0
Brann	2025	Eliteserien	0	0	0	0	0	0	—		0	0
Brann	2026	Eliteserien	16	0	3	0	7	0	—		26	0
Brann	Total		62	6	17	1	8	0	1	0	88	7
Brann 2	2021	3. divisjon	3	0	—		—		—		3	0
Brann 2	2022	3. divisjon	3	0	—		—		—		3	0
Brann 2	2023	2. divisjon	2	0	—		—		—		2	0
Brann 2	Total		8	0	—		—		—		8	0
Career total			70	6	17	1	8	0	1	0	96	7
