= Japhet Sery Larsen =

Danish footballer (born 2000)

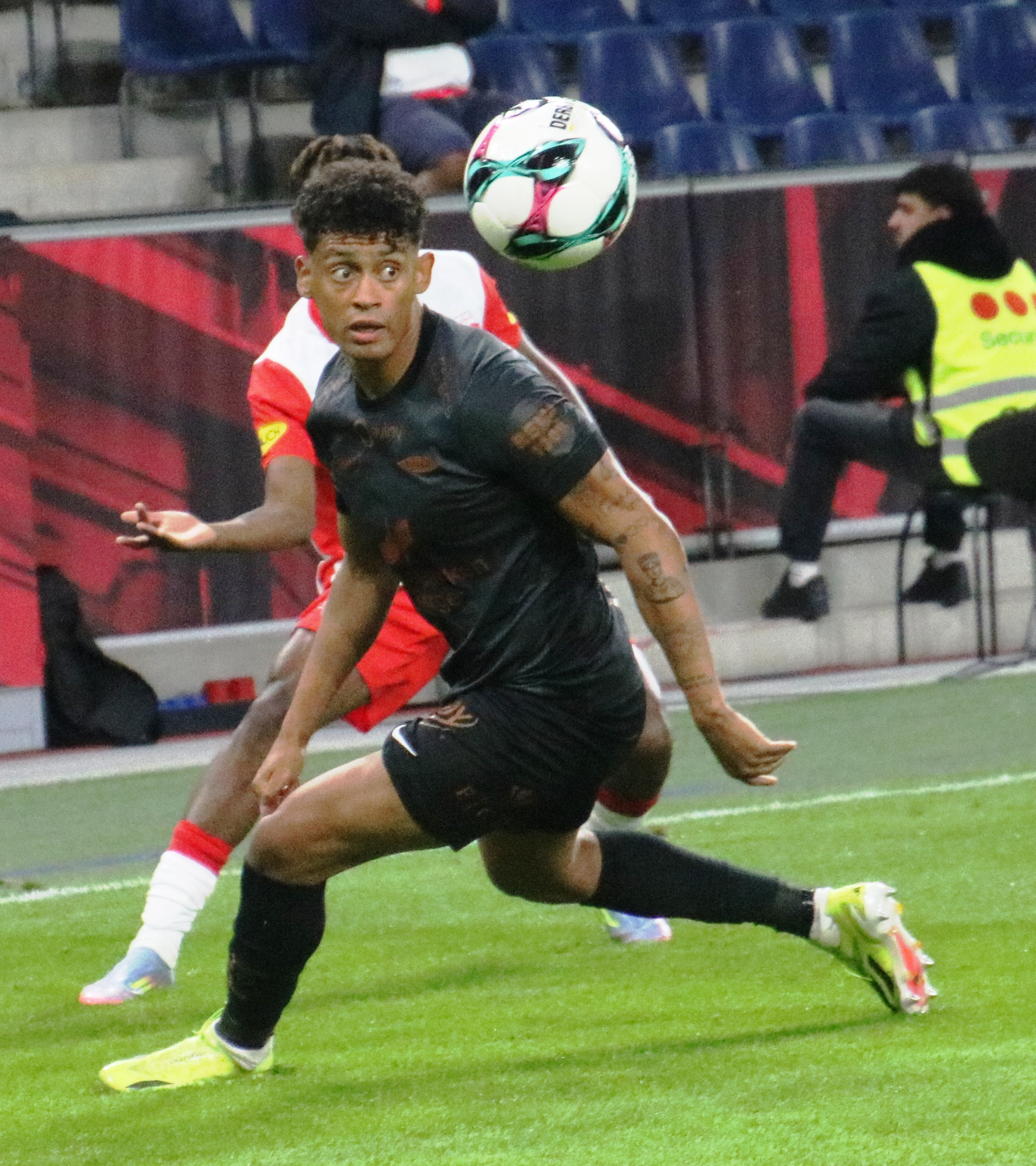
- Sery playing for Brann in 2025

Personal information
- Full name: Japhet Sery Larsen
- Date of birth: 10 April 2000 (age 26)
- Place of birth: Copenhagen, Denmark
- Height: 1.85 m (6 ft 1 in)
- Position: Centre-back

Team information
- Current team: Philadelphia Union
- Number: 5

Youth career
- CIK
- KB
- B.93
- –2015: Lyngby
- 2015–2020: Midtjylland
- 2019–2020: → Brentford (loan)

Senior career*
Years	Team	Apps	(Gls)
2020–2021	Midtjylland	4	(0)
2021	Brann	7	(1)
2022	Bodø/Glimt	10	(0)
2023–2025	Brann	70	(1)
2026–	Philadelphia Union	4	(0)

International career
2016	Denmark U16	5	(1)
2017	Denmark U17	5	(0)
2017	Denmark U18	2	(0)
2018–2019	Denmark U19	11	(0)
2019–2022	Denmark U21	9	(0)
- * Club domestic league appearances and goals as of 23:32, 15 March 2026 (UTC)

Japhet Sery Larsen (born 10 April 2000) is a Danish professional footballer who plays as a centre-back for the Philadelphia Union of Major League Soccer.

Sery is a product of the FC Midtjylland academy and began his senior career with the club in 2020. He transferred to Norwegian club SK Brann in 2021 and to FK Bodø/Glimt in 2022, before returning to SK Brann in 2023. In 2026, Sery transferred to Philadelphia Union. He was capped by Denmark at youth level. Sery's nickname is "Jeff".

== Club career ==
=== FC Midtjylland ===
A central defender, Sery began his career with spells at CIK, KB, B93 and Lyngby, before joining the academy at Superliga club FC Midtjylland in July 2015. He progressed to sign a contract extension in January 2018 and was a part of the club's 2017–18 and 2018–19 U19 Ligaen-winning squads. Sery was an unused substitute for the first team on one occasion during the 2018–19 season and signed a five-year professional contract in 2019.

On 21 June 2019, Sery joined the B team at Championship club Brentford on loan for the duration of the 2019–20 season. He was an unused substitute for the first team during a 1–0 FA Cup third round victory over Stoke City on 4 January 2020.

Sery returned to Midtjylland to begin the 2020–21 season as a member of the first team squad. He made 8 appearances during the season and scored one goal, in a 3–0 win over OB on 10 March 2021. Sery left the club in July 2021.

=== SK Brann ===
On 24 July 2021, Sery moved to Norway to sign a 4 1/2-year contract with Eliteserien club SK Brann. After making his debut eight days later with a start in a 3–0 Norwegian Cup second round win over Fana, Sery missed five weeks due to requiring surgery for appendicitis. He made 9 appearances and scored one goal during the remainder of the 2021 season, which culminated in relegation after defeat in the 2021 Eliteserien relegation play-offs. Sery departed the club in February 2022.

=== FK Bodø/Glimt ===
On 2 February 2022, Sery signed a three-year contract with reigning Eliteserien champions FK Bodø/Glimt. Either side of two months out with an injury suffered in July 2022, Sery made 18 appearances during the 2022 season and departed the club in January 2023.

=== Return to SK Brann ===
On 25 January 2023, Sery returned to SK Brann and signed a four-year contract. In his absence, the club had been promoted back to the Eliteserien. During a 2023 season in which the club finished as runners-up in the Eliteserien and won the Norwegian Cup, Sery made 28 appearances and scored two goals. Sery made 29 appearances during the 2024 season, in which the club repeated its runner-up finish and he made a further 28 appearances in 2025. Sery transferred out of the club in January 2026 and ended his two spells at the Brann Stadion with 98 appearances and four goals.

=== Philadelphia Union ===
On 13 January 2026, Sery transferred to Major League Soccer club Philadelphia Union and signed a 3 1/2-year contract, with the option of a further year, for an undisclosed fee.

== International career ==
Sery was capped by Denmark at U16, U17, U18, U19 and U21 level.

== Personal life ==
Sery grew up in Herlev and is of Ivorian descent. As a youth, he competed in track and field for Sparta.

== Career statistics ==
As of match played 14 March 2026

Appearances and goals by club, season and competition
Club	Season	League			National cup (Note: Includes Danish Cup, FA Cup, Norwegian Cup)		League cup (Note: Includes EFL Cup)		Continental		Other		Total	
Club	Season	Division	Apps	Goals	Apps	Goals	Apps	Goals	Apps	Goals	Apps	Goals	Apps	Goals
FC Midtjylland	2018–19	Danish Superliga	0	0	0	0	—		0	0	—		0	0
FC Midtjylland	2020–21	Danish Superliga	4	0	4	1	—		0	0	—		8	1
FC Midtjylland	Total		4	0	4	1	—		0	0	—		8	1
Brentford (loan)	2019–20	Championship	0	0	0	0	0	0	—		—		0	0
SK Brann	2021	Eliteserien	7	1	2	0	—		—		0	0	9	1
FK Bodø/Glimt	2021	—			1	0	—		—		—		1	0
FK Bodø/Glimt	2022	Eliteserien	10	0	3	0	—		5 (Note: 3 appearances in Conference League, 1 appearance in Champions League, 1 appearance in Europa League)	0	—		18	0
FK Bodø/Glimt	Total		10	0	4	0	—		5	0	—		19	0
SK Brann	2022	—			4	0	—		—		—		4	0
SK Brann	2023	Eliteserien	24	0	2	1	—		2 (Note: Appearance(s) in Conference League)	1	—		28	2
SK Brann	2024	Eliteserien	26	0	2	0	—		1	0	—		29	0
SK Brann	2025	Eliteserien	20	1	2	0	—		6 (Note: 4 appearances in Europa League, 2 appearances in Champions League)	0	—		28	1
SK Brann	Total		70	1	10	1	—		9	1	—		89	3
SK Brann 2	2025	Norwegian Second Division Group 1	1	0	—		—		—		—		1	0
Philadelphia Union	2026	Major League Soccer	4	0	—		—		2 (Note: Appearances in CONCACAF Champions Cup)	0	0	0	6	0
Career total			96	2	20	2	0	0	16	1	0	0	132	5

== Honours ==
SK Brann

- Norwegian Cup: 2022
