= Aune Heggebø =

Norwegian footballer (born 2001)

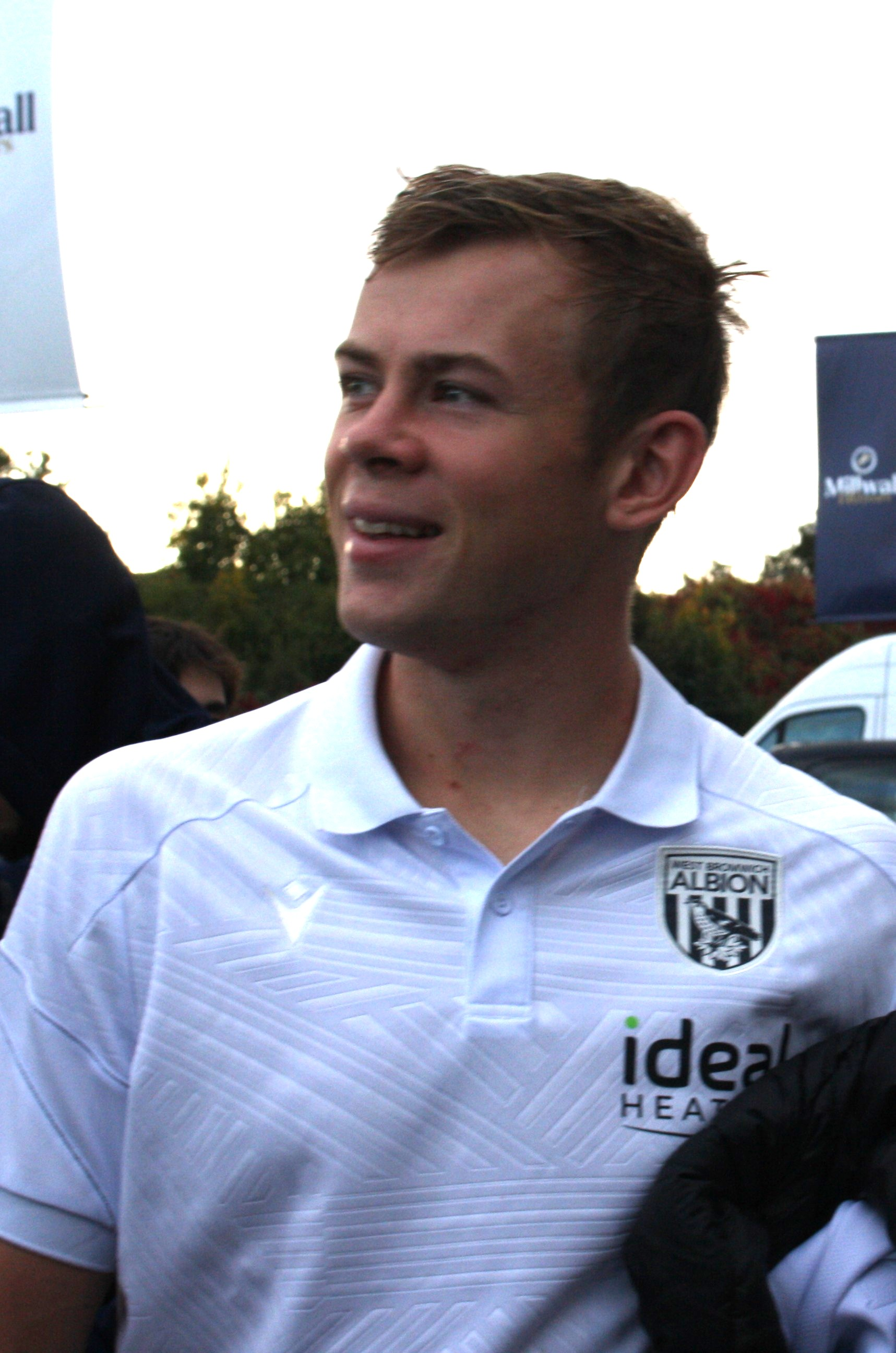
- Heggebø in 2025 with West Bromwich Albion

Personal information
- Full name: Aune Selland Heggebø
- Date of birth: 29 July 2001 (age 25)
- Place of birth: Bergen, Norway
- Height: 1.85 m (6 ft 1 in)
- Position: Striker

Team information
- Current team: West Bromwich Albion
- Number: 19

Youth career
- –2014: Bjarg
- 2014–2019: Brann

Senior career*
Years	Team	Apps	(Gls)
2017–2023	Brann 2	52	(16)
2018–2025	Brann	121	(41)
2019	→ Nest-Sotra (loan)	3	(2)
2020	→ Øygarden (loan)	30	(8)
2025–	West Bromwich Albion	56	(12)

International career^{‡}
2019	Norway U18	5	(1)
2021	Norway U20	2	(0)
2022	Norway U21	1	(0)
2025–	Norway	2	(0)
- * Club domestic league appearances and goals as of 21:23, 17 October 2026 (UTC) ‡ National team caps and goals as of 14 October 2025

Aune Selland Heggebø (born 29 July 2001) is a Norwegian professional footballer who plays as a striker for EFL Championship club West Bromwich Albion and the Norway national team.

== Club career ==
=== Brann ===
Heggebø was born in Bergen and played youth football with IL Bjarg and Brann, before starting his professional career at the same club. In 2019, he had a short loan spell at Nest-Sotra in Norwegian First Division.

In the 2021 season, he became the preferred choice after his teammate Daouda Bamba transferred in the summer transfer window. In early November 2021, his contract with SK Brann was extended until 2025.

=== West Bromwich Albion ===
On 7 July 2025, Heggebø joined EFL Championship club West Bromwich Albion on a five-year contract. He made his debut for the club on 9 August 2025, in a 1–0 win against Blackburn Rovers. He scored his first goal for the club on 12 August 2025, in a 1–1 draw with Derby County in the EFL Cup which Albion lost on penalties.

On 20 August 2026, the FA charged Heggebø with "successful deception of a match official" and banned him for two matches on suspicion of a deliberate handball goal in the league opener against Norwich City.

== International career ==
Heggebo received his first call-up to the Norway national team on 2 September 2025. He made his debut on 9 September 2025, in a 11–1 win against Moldova in a 2026 FIFA World Cup qualifier.

== Career statistics ==
=== Club ===
As of match played 17 October 2026

Appearances and goals by club, season and competition
Club	Season	League			National cup (Note: Includes Norwegian Cup, FA Cup)		League cup (Note: Includes EFL Cup)		Europe		Total	
Club	Season	Division	Apps	Goals	Apps	Goals	Apps	Goals	Apps	Goals	Apps	Goals
Brann	2018	Eliteserien	0	0	1	1	—		—		1	1
Brann	2019	Eliteserien	5	0	0	0	—		—		5	0
Brann	2021	Eliteserien	22	8	2	2	—		—		24	10
Brann	2022	Norwegian First Division	30	13	3	1	—		—		33	14
Brann	2023	Eliteserien	22	2	3	1	—		4 (Note: Appearances in UEFA Conference League)	0	29	3
Brann	2024	Eliteserien	29	11	3	3	—		6	1	38	15
Brann	2025	Eliteserien	13	7	2	0	—		0	0	15	7
Brann	Total		121	41	14	8	0	0	10	1	145	50
Nest-Sotra (loan)	2019	OBOS-ligaen	3	2	0	0	—		—		3	2
Øygarden (loan)	2020	OBOS-ligaen	30	8	0	0	—		—		30	8
West Bromwich Albion	2025–26	Championship	46	9	1	0	1	1	—		48	10
West Bromwich Albion	2026–27	Championship	10	3	0	0	1	0	—		11	3
West Bromwich Albion	Total		56	12	1	0	2	1	0	0	59	13
Career total			210	63	15	8	2	1	10	1	237	73

== Honours ==
SK Brann

- Norwegian First Division: 2022
- Norwegian Football Cup: 2022
