= Filip Delaveris =

Norwegian soccer player (born 2000)

Personal information
- Full name: Filip Møller Delaveris
- Date of birth: 10 December 2000 (age 25)
- Place of birth: Oslo, Norway
- Height: 1.80 m (5 ft 11 in)
- Position: Left winger

Team information
- Current team: Skeid
- Number: 77

Youth career
- –2016: Lyn
- 2016–2017: Odd

Senior career*
Years	Team	Apps	(Gls)
2017–2019	Odd 2	52	(11)
2018–2020	Odd	16	(3)
2020–2021	Vitesse	1	(0)
2021–2023	Brann	12	(0)
2022	→ KFUM (loan)	23	(5)
2023	→ J-Södra (loan)	11	(0)
2023	→ Sandnes Ulf (loan)	9	(0)
2024	Eidsvold Turn	24	(6)
2025–	Skeid	42	(7)

International career^{‡}
2018	Norway U18	6	(2)
2019	Norway U19	1	(0)
2019	Norway U20	2	(0)
- * Club domestic league appearances and goals as of 15 November 2026 ‡ National team caps and goals as of 25 February 2025

Filip Delaveris (born 10 December 2000) is a Norwegian footballer who plays as a left winger for Skeid.
