= Erlend Hustad =

Norwegian footballer (born 1997)

Personal information
- Date of birth: 3 January 1997 (age 29)
- Place of birth: Molde, Norway
- Height: 1.92 m (6 ft 3 1/2 in)
- Position: Striker

Team information
- Current team: KÍ
- Number: 20

Youth career
- –2016: Molde

Senior career*
Years	Team	Apps	(Gls)
2015	Molde	0	(0)
2016–2019	Notodden	68	(17)
2019–2022	Brann	19	(1)
2019	→ Nest-Sotra (loan)	5	(3)
2021	→ Sandnes Ulf (loan)	30	(13)
2022–2023	Jerv	34	(1)
2024–2025	Raufoss	45	(13)
2026–	KÍ	20	(5)

International career^{‡}
2015	Norway U18	4	(0)
- * Club domestic league appearances and goals as of 1 November 2026 ‡ National team caps and goals as of 08:28, 19 June 2021 (UTC)

Erlend Hustad (born 3 January 1997) is a Norwegian football player who plays as a striker for Faroe Islands Premier League club KÍ.

== Career statistics ==
=== Club ===
As of match played 20 August 2026

Appearances and goals by club, season and competition
Club	Season	League			National Cup		Europe		Other		Total	
Club	Season	Division	Apps	Goals	Apps	Goals	Apps	Goals	Apps	Goals	Apps	Goals
Molde	2015	Eliteserien	0	0	1	0	—		—		1	0
Notodden	2016	2. divisjon	10	1	0	0	—		—		10	1
Notodden	2017	2. divisjon	18	5	3	2	—		4 (Note: Appearances in promotion play-offs.)	1	25	8
Notodden	2018	1. divisjon	29	9	3	1	—		—		32	10
Notodden	2019	1. divisjon	11	2	2	1	—		—		13	3
Notodden	Total		68	17	8	4	—		4	1	80	22
Brann	2019	Eliteserien	0	0	0	0	—		—		0	0
Brann	2020	Eliteserien	19	1	—		—		—		19	1
Brann	Total		19	1	0	0	—		—		19	1
Nest-Sotra (loan)	2019	1. divisjon	5	3	0	0	—		—		5	3
Sandnes Ulf (loan)	2021	1. divisjon	30	13	3	1	—		—		33	14
Jerv	2022	Eliteserien	21	0	3	0	—		—		24	0
Jerv	2023	OBOS-ligaen	13	1	0	0	—		—		13	1
Jerv	Total		34	1	3	0	—		—		37	1
Raufoss	2024	OBOS-ligaen	28	10	1	0	—		—		29	10
Raufoss	2025	OBOS-ligaen	17	3	2	1	—		—		19	4
Raufoss	Total		45	13	3	1	—		—		48	13
KÍ Klaksvík	2026	Faroe Islands Premier League	14	3	5	2	5	0	—		24	5
Career total			215	51	22	8	5	0	4	1	246	60
