= Ole Martin Kolskogen =

Norwegian footballer (born 2001)

Personal information
- Full name: Ole Martin Lekven Kolskogen
- Date of birth: 20 January 2001 (age 25)
- Place of birth: Osøyro, Norway
- Height: 1.87 m (6 ft 2 in)
- Position: Centre-back

Team information
- Current team: Horsens
- Number: 24

Youth career
- 2007–2016: Os Turn

Senior career*
Years	Team	Apps	(Gls)
2016–2017	Os Turn	20	(1)
2018–2019	Åsane	34	(0)
2020–2023	Brann	41	(0)
2022	→ Jerv (loan)	20	(0)
2023	Aalesund	10	(0)
2023	→ Åsane (loan)	13	(0)
2024	Åsane	13	(0)
2024–	Horsens	58	(1)

International career
2017	Norway U16	6	(0)
2018	Norway U17	12	(0)
2019	Norway U18	9	(0)
2019	Norway U19	3	(0)
2019–2022	Norway U21	8	(0)
- * Club domestic league appearances and goals as of 13:31, 27 July 2026 (UTC)

Ole Martin Lekven Kolskogen (born 20 March 2001) is a Norwegian professional footballer who plays as a centre-back for Danish Superliga club AC Horsens.

== Career ==
Kolskogen has previously played for Os Turn in lower divisions. While playing for Os Turn he got his first international matches for Norway U16.

He signed for Åsane in 2018, He made his debut in the Norwegian First Division while playing with his nickname "Olis" on his jersey-back. Åsane was relegated to the 2nd division, but was promoted to the Norwegian First Division after the 2019 season, partly due to solid defensive play from Kolskogen. During his time in Åsane he got several international matches for Norway U18 and U19, and was called up to U21.

He signed for SK Brann in late 2019.

On 8 July 2024 the Danish 1st Division club AC Horsens confirmed that Kolskogen had joined the club.
