= 2025 SK Brann season =

117th season in existence of SK Brann

SK Brann
2025 season
- Chairman: Aslak Sverdrup
- Manager: Freyr Alexandersson
- Stadium: Brann Stadion
- Eliteserien: 3rd
- Norwegian Football Cup: Third round
- UEFA Champions League: Second qualifying round
- UEFA Europa League: League phase
- Top goalscorer: League: Aune Heggebø (7 goals); All: Bård Finne; Sævar Atli Magnússon (10 goals)
- Highest home attendance: 17,500 vs. Rosenborg; Eliteserien, 11 May 2025 vs. Sarpsborg 08; Eliteserien, 16 May 2025 vs. Viking; Eliteserien, 13 July 2025
- Lowest home attendance: 14,587 vs. RB Salzburg; Champions League Qualifiers, 23 July 2025
- Average home league attendance: 16,358 (93.47%)
- Biggest win: 6–0 vs. Varegg (A); Norwegian Cup, 13 April 2025
- Biggest defeat: 0–3 vs. Fredrikstad (A); Eliteserien, 29 March 2025; 0–3 vs. Molde (H); Eliteserien, 29 May 2025; 0–3 vs. Bodø/Glimt (A); Eliteserien, 21 June 2025; 1–4 vs. RB Salzburg (H); Champions League Qualifiers, 23 July 2025; 0–3 vs. Viking (A); Eliteserien, 5 October 2025
- All statistics correct as of 30 October 2025.

The 2025 season is the onging 117th season in the history of SK Brann and their 3rd consecutive season in the top flight of Norwegian football. In addition to the Eliteserien and the Norwegian Football Cup, Brann participated in the 2025–26 UEFA Champions League and the 2025–26 UEFA Europa League.

== Competitions ==
=== Overview ===
Competition	First match	Last match	Starting round	Final position	Record							
Competition	First match	Last match	Starting round	Final position	Pld	W	D	L	GF	GA	GD	Win %
Eliteserien	29 March 2025	30 November 2025	Matchday 1		26	16	4	6	50	38	+12	61.54
Norwegian Football Cup	13 April 2025	7 May 2025	First round	Third round	3	2	0	1	9	2	+7	66.67
UEFA Champions League	23 July 2025	30 July 2025	Second qualifying round	Second qualifying round	2	0	1	1	2	5	−3	0.00
UEFA Europa League	7 August 2025		Third qualifying round		6	4	0	2	10	4	+6	66.67
Total					37	22	5	10	71	49	+22	59.46

Last updated: 29 October 2025
Source: Competitions

=== Eliteserien ===
==== League table ====
Pos	Team	Pld	W	D	L	GF	GA	GD	Pts	Qualification or relegation
2	Bodø/Glimt	30	22	4	4	85	28	+57	70	Qualification for the Champions League third qualifying round
3	Tromsø	30	18	3	9	50	36	+14	57	Qualification for the Europa League second qualifying round (Note: Lillestrøm from the 2025 Norwegian First Division qualified for the Europa League play-off round as winners of the 2025 Norwegian Football Cup.)
4	Brann	30	17	5	8	55	46	+9	56	Qualification for the Conference League second qualifying round
5	Sandefjord	30	15	3	12	55	42	+13	48	
6	Vålerenga	30	13	4	13	49	50	−1	43	

Source: Football Association of Norway (in Norwegian)
Rules for classification: 1) Points; 2) Goal difference; 3) Goals scored; 4) Head-to-head points; 5) Head-to-head goal difference; 6) Head-to-head goals scored.

==== Results summary ====
Overall								Home						Away					
Pld	W	D	L	GF	GA	GD	Pts	W	D	L	GF	GA	GD	W	D	L	GF	GA	GD
30	17	5	8	55	46	+9	56	10	3	2	31	19	+12	7	2	6	24	27	−3

Last updated: 27 November 2025.
Source: Norwegian Football Federation

==== Results by round ====
Round	1	2	3	4	5	6	7	8	9	10	11	12	13	14	15	16	17	18	19	20	21	22	23	24	25	26	27	28	29	30
Ground	A	H	A	H	A	H	H	A	H	A	H	A	H	A	H	A	H	A	H	A	H	A	H	A	H	A	A	H	A	H
Result	L	W	W	W	W	D	D	W	W	L	W	D	W	L	L	W	W	W	W	D	W	W	L	L	W	W	L	D	L	W
Position	16	11	7	3	3	3	4	3	3	3	3	4	4	4	5	4	3	3	3	3	3	3	3	3	3	3	3	3	4	4

Source: www.nifs.no
A = Away; H = Home; W = Win; D = Draw; L = Loss

==== Matches ====
The match schedule was announced on 20 December 2024.

29 March 2025 1	Fredrikstad	3–0	Brann	Fredrikstad
18:00 UTC+1	Holten 10'; Kornvig 23' (o.g.); Skogvold 83'	Report	De Roeve (yellow card) 56'	Stadium: Fredrikstad Stadion; Attendance: 10,788; Referee: Tore Hansen

6 April 2025 2	Brann	3–1	Tromsø	Bergen
14:30 UTC+2	Heggebø 62', 68'; Castro 74'	Report	Skjærvik (yellow card) 17'; Jenssen 34'; Mikkelsen (yellow card) 52'	Stadium: Brann Stadion; Attendance: 16,557; Referee: Ola Hobber Nilsen

10 April 2025 17	Brann	2–1	Strømsgodset	Bergen
19:00 UTC+2	Castro 45+3' (pen.); De Roeve (yellow card) 65'; Horn Myhre 70'; Soltvedt (yellow card) 74'	Report	Dahl (yellow card) 44'; Farji 50'	Stadium: Brann Stadion; Attendance: 14,606; Referee: Sigurd Smehus Kringstad

21 April 2025 3	Strømsgodset	1–2	Brann	Drammen
17:00 UTC+2	Farji 32'; Krasniqi (yellow card) 83'; Bråtveit (yellow card) 85'	Report	Knudsen (yellow card) 69'; Kornvig 77'; Heggebø 90+5'	Stadium: Marienlyst Stadion; Attendance: 6,507; Referee: Christian Moen

27 April 2025 4	Brann	3–2	Bryne	Bergen
17:00 UTC+2	Kornvig (yellow card) 29'; Helland (yellow card) 31'; Finne 64'; Horn Myhre 76'; Castro 90+3' (pen.)	Report	Moreira 8'; Scriven 15', (yellow card) 73'; Saunes (yellow card) 57'; Strunck (yellow card) 80'; Tveita (yellow card) 85'	Stadium: Brann Stadion; Attendance: 15,707; Referee: Svein Tore Sinnes

3 May 2025 5	Vålerenga	2–4	Brann	Oslo
18:00 UTC+2	Brajanac 48'; Vinícius (yellow card) 52'; Riisnæs 53'; Strand (yellow card) 75'	Report	Kornvig 4', (yellow card) 33'; Guðmundsson 36'; Pallesen Knudsen (yellow card) 39'; Helland (yellow card) 72'; Sande 81'; Heggebø 90+6' (pen.)	Stadium: Intility Arena; Attendance: 16,556; Referee: Tore Hansen

11 May 2025 6	Brann	0–0	Rosenborg	Bergen
14:30 UTC+2	Soltvedt (yellow card) 88'; Sery Larsen (yellow card) 89'	Report	Broholm (yellow card) 33'; Sæter (yellow card) 89'	Stadium: Brann Stadion; Attendance: 17,500; Referee: Marius Hansen Grøtta

16 May 2025 7	Brann	2–2	Sarpsborg 08	Bergen
18:00 UTC+2	Guðmundsson 4'; Sande 59'	Report	Carstensen 30'; Tebo Uchenna (yellow card) 60'; Tangen 90+5'	Stadium: Brann Stadion; Attendance: 17,500; Referee: Rohit Saggi

25 May 2025 8	Haugesund	0–2	Brann	Haugesund
19:15 UTC+2	Nyhammer (yellow card) 26'; Dia (yellow card) 90+1'	Report	Sande (yellow card) 6', (goal) 60'; Heggebø (yellow card) 26', (goal) 90'	Stadium: Haugesund Stadion; Attendance: 5,404; Referee: Mathias Støfringshaug

29 May 2025 15	Brann	0–3	Molde	Bergen
18:00 UTC+2	Soltvedt (yellow card) 45+3'; Myhre (yellow card) 54'; Helland (yellow card) 82'; Hansen (yellow card) 89'	Report	Gulbrandsen 11', (yellow card) 32'; Breivik (yellow card) 39'; Enggård (yellow card) 45' (yellow-red card) 90+1'; Eriksen 48'; Karlstrøm (yellow card) 55'; Kabini (yellow card) 60'; Berisha 72', (red card) 83'; Hestad (yellow card) 76'; Granaas (yellow card) 84'	Stadium: Brann Stadion; Attendance: 17,002; Referee: Mohammad Usman Aslam

1 June 2025 9	Brann	4–2	Kristiansund	Bergen
17:00 UTC+2	Finne 4', 41'; Heggebø 14', 22' (pen.); Remmem (yellow card) 81'; Kornvig (yellow card) 88'	Report	Alte 30', (yellow card) 52'; Isah 40'	Stadium: Brann Stadion; Attendance: 14,957; Referee: Rohit Saggi

21 June 2025 10	Bodø/Glimt	3–0	Brann	Bodø
18:00 UTC+2	Blomberg 5'; Høgh 40'; Saltnes 47'; Bjørtuft (yellow card) 79'	Report		Stadium: Aspmyra Stadion; Attendance: 7,325; Referee: Ola Hobber Nilsen

30 June 2025 11	Brann	1–0	Sandefjord	Bergen
19:00 UTC+2	Pedersen (yellow card) 16'; Soltvedt 89'	Report	Smajlović (yellow card) 12'; Mørk (yellow card) 90+3'; Tegström (yellow card) 90+8'	Stadium: Brann Stadion; Attendance: 15,849; Referee: Mathias Støfringshaug

5 July 2025 12	HamKam	1–1	Brann	Hamar
14:00 UTC+2	Mares (penalty missed) 13'; Roaldsøy 34'	Report	Myhre 83'; Finne (penalty missed) 85'	Stadium: Briskeby Stadion; Attendance: 5,213; Referee: Marius Hansen Grøtta

13 July 2025 13	Brann	3–1	Viking	Bergen
19:15 UTC+2	Soltvedt 18'; Sery Larsen 28', (yellow card) 65' (red card) 90+5'; Pedersen (yellow card) 49'; Magnússon 77'	Report	Auklend (yellow card) 30'; Christiansen (yellow card) 59'; Bell (yellow card) 82', (goal) 90+2'; Haugen (yellow card) 85'	Stadium: Brann Stadion; Attendance: 17,500; Referee: Tore Hansen

19 July 2025 14	KFUM Oslo	2–0	Brann	Oslo
14:00 UTC+2	Nuñez 31'; Hickson 45'; Schneider (yellow card) 59' (yellow-red card) 74'	Report	Guðmundsson (yellow card) 50'; Kornvig (yellow card) 55'; Helland (yellow card) 82' (yellow-red card) 90+8'; Sørensen (yellow card) 82'	Stadium: KFUM Arena; Attendance: 3,017; Referee: Rohit Saggi

2 August 2025 16	Sarpsborg 08	1–4	Brann	Sarpsborg
18:00 UTC+2	Koch (yellow card) 49'; Ørjasæter 51'	Report	De Roeve 42'; Finne 65'; Haaland 79'; Guðmundsson 84'	Stadium: Sarpsborg Stadion; Attendance: 5,339; Referee: Ola Hobber Nilsen

17 August 2025 18	Tromsø	1–2	Brann	Tromsø
14:30 UTC+2	Cornic (yellow card) 20'; Kinteh (yellow card) 30'; Erlien 38'	Report	Magnússon 63'; De Roeve 75'; Myhre (yellow card) 76'; Castro (yellow card) 87'; Helland (yellow card) 88'	Stadium: Romssa Arena; Attendance: 6,477; Referee: Tore Hansen

31 August 2025 20	Kristiansund	2–2	Brann	Kristiansund
14:30 UTC+2	Igor (yellow card) 10'; Kilen (yellow card) 25'; Ødegård (yellow card) 32'; Ulvestad (yellow card) 69'; Isah 75', 89'	Report	Sørensen (yellow card) 31'; Magnússon 67', 69' (pen.); Myhre (yellow card) 84'	Stadium: Nordmøre Stadion; Attendance: 3,256; Referee: Sigurd Smehus Kringstad

13 September 2025 21	Brann	3–2	Vålerenga	Bergen
18:00 UTC+2	Mathisen 14'; Knudsen (yellow card) 52'; Myhre 57'; Magnússon 66', (yellow card) 67'; Sørensen (yellow card) 69'; Holm (yellow card) 72'	Report	Thorvaldsen 8', (yellow card) 9'; Sørensen 46'; Tshiembe (yellow card) 84'; Bjørdal (red card) 90+3'	Stadium: Brann Stadion; Attendance: 17,176; Referee: Rohit Saggi

20 September 2025 22	Sandefjord	0–3	Brann	Sandefjord
16:00 UTC+2	Gjone (red card) 45+4'	Report	Castro 13' (pen.); Sørensen (yellow card) 50'; van der Spa 56' (o.g.); Kornvig 66'	Stadium: Jotun Arena; Attendance: 5,101; Referee: Mathias Støfringshaug

28 September 2025 19	Brann	1–0	Fredrikstad	Bergen
14:30 UTC+2	Kornvig 35'	Report	Børsheim (yellow card) 77'	Stadium: Brann Stadion; Attendance: 15,932; Referee: Tore Hansen

5 October 2025 24	Viking	3–0	Brann	Stavanger
14:30 UTC+2	Christiansen 7'; Austbø 43'; Svendsen 68'; Tripić (yellow card) 70'	Report	Helland (yellow card) 5'; Sørensen (yellow card) 72'; Myhre (yellow card) 90+3'	Stadium: Lyse Arena; Attendance: 15,900; Referee: Ola Hobber Nilsen

18 October 2025 25	Brann	4–1	Haugesund	Bergen
18:00 UTC+2	Kornvig (yellow card) 30'; Finne 32', 51'; Guðmundsson 47', 71'	Report	Nyhammer (yellow card) 7'; Hope (yellow card) 13'; Hamalainen (yellow card) 52'; Korkeakunnas (yellow card) 52'; Diarra 84'	Stadium: Brann Stadion; Attendance: 15,342; Referee: Marius Hansen Grøtta

26 October 2025 26	Rosenborg	2–3	Brann	Trondheim
14:30 UTC+2	Jenssen (yellow card) 15'; Islamović 45+2'; Pereira 52', (yellow card) 90+3'	Report	Kornvig 20', 78'; Pedersen (yellow card) 39'; Haaland 42'; Helland (yellow card) 45+7'; Larsen (yellow card) 70'; Dyngeland (yellow card) 90'	Stadium: Lerkendal Stadion; Attendance: 15,701; Referee: Sigurd Smehus Kringstad

29 October 2025 23	Brann	1–2	Bodø/Glimt	Bergen
19:00 UTC+1	Mathisen (yellow card) 30'; Holm 45+1'; Sørensen (yellow card) 61'; Kornvig (yellow card) 88'; Helland (yellow card) 90+9'	Report	Helmersen 76'; Blomberg 86'; Saltnes (yellow card) 90+7'; Auklend (yellow card) 90+9'	Stadium: Brann Stadion; Attendance: 17,026; Referee: Tore Hansen

2 November 2025 27	Bryne	2–1	Brann	Bryne
17:00 UTC+1	Grødem 1'; Haahr 18'; Sødal (yellow card) 36'; Larsen (yellow card) 77'	Report	Kornvig 59' (pen.); Sørensen (yellow card) 79' (yellow-red card) 87'	Stadium: Bryne Stadion; Attendance: 3,304; Referee: Mohammad Usman Aslam

9 November 2025 28	Brann	1–1	KFUM	Bergen
17:00 UTC+1	Kornvig (yellow card) 37'; Mathisen 57'	Report	Tønnessen (yellow card) 6'; Berglie (yellow card) 16'; Nouri 74'; Moesgaard (yellow card) 82'	Stadium: Brann Stadion; Attendance: 14,560; Referee: Christian Moen

22 November 2025 29	Molde	4–0	Brann	Molde
18:00 UTC+1	Risa (yellow card) 26'; Kasanwirjo (yellow card) 45'; Breivik 54'; Spiten-Nysæter (yellow card) 61', (goal) 65'; Kabini 75'; Granaas 90'	Report		Stadium: Aker Stadion; Attendance: 5,820; Referee: Svein Tore Sinnes

30 November 2025 30	Brann	3–1	HamKam	Bergen
17:00 UTC+1	Sørensen 33'; De Roeve 45' (pen.); Kornvig (yellow card) 55', (goal) 60'	Report	Lien 4'; Amundsen-Day (red card) 11'; Sjølstad (yellow card) 18'; Ekeroth (yellow card) 18'; Potur (yellow card) 45'; Larsen (yellow card) 90'	Stadium: Brann Stadion; Attendance: 14,081; Referee: Marius Lien

=== Norwegian Football Cup ===
==== 2025 Norwegian Football Cup ====
13 April 2025 First round	Varegg	0–6	Brann	Bergen
16:00 UTC+2	Engeberg (yellow card) 77'	Report	Sande 6'; Hansen 12', 63' (pen.); Finne 35'; Pedersen 69'; Holten 79'	Stadium: Stemmemyren Kunstgress; Attendance: 1,181; Referee: Sivert Øksnes Amland

24 April 2025 Second round	Bjarg	0–2	Brann	Bergen
18:00 UTC+2	Jørgensen (yellow card) 41'; Christophersen (yellow card) 49'; Ahlander (yellow card) 65'	Report	Hansen 2'; Finne 13'; Sande (yellow card) 44'	Stadium: Stavollen Kunstgress; Referee: Jan Morten Tennøy

7 May 2025 Third round	Bryne	2–1 (a.e.t.)	Brann	Bryne
18:00 UTC+2	Sødal (yellow card) 33'; Steffensen 45+2'; Norheim (yellow card) 49'; Scriven (yellow card) 90'; Strunck (yellow card) 100'; Kryger 118', (yellow card) 120'	Report	Finne 84'	Stadium: Bryne Stadion; Attendance: 2,252; Referee: Sigurd Smehus Kringstad

==== 2025-26 Norwegian Football Cup ====
17 September 2025 Third round	Mjøndalen	1–5	Brann	Mjøndalen
18:00 UTC+2	Kekeli (yellow card) 31'; Wæhler 38'; Skau (red card) 47'	Report	Boakye 1'; Hansen 16'; Dragsnes 45'; De Roeve 48' (pen.); Kornvig (yellow card) 54'; Vik (yellow card) 73'; Finne 74'	Stadium: Consto Arena; Attendance: 1,237; Referee: Christian Moen

=== UEFA Champions League ===
==== Second qualifying round ====
The draw for the second qualifying round was held on 18 June 2025.

23 July 2025 First leg	Brann (Norway)	1–4	(Austria) Red Bull Salzburg	Bergen, Norway
19:00 CEST	Sørensen (yellow card) 6'; Sery Larsen (yellow card) 8'; Magnússon 20'; Mathisen (yellow card) 39'; Myhre (yellow card) 68'	Report	Diambou (yellow card) 22'; Nene 58'; Onisiwo 61'; Vertessen 87'; Kjærgaard 90+2' (pen.)	Stadium: Brann Stadion; Attendance: 14,587; Referee: Damian Sylwestrzak (Poland)

30 July 2025 Second leg	Red Bull Salzburg (Austria)	1–1 (5–2 agg.)	(Norway) Brann	Salzburg, Austria
20:45 CEST	Kjærgaard 6'; Vertessen (yellow card) 47'; Nene (yellow card) 59'; Bidstrup (yellow card) 67'; Rasmussen (yellow card) 82'; Baidoo (yellow card) 85'	Report	Kornvig 3'; Soltvedt (yellow card) 5'; Sørensen (yellow card) 54'; Mathisen (yellow card) 66'; Magnússon (yellow card) 67'; Sery Larsen (yellow card) 70'	Stadium: Red Bull Arena; Attendance: 11,949; Referee: Rade Obrenović (Slovenia)

=== UEFA Europa League ===
==== Third qualifying round ====
The draw for the third qualifying round was held on 21 July 2025.

7 August 2025 First leg	BK Häcken (Sweden)	0–2	(Norway) Brann	Gothenburg, Sweden
19:00 CEST	Lode (yellow card) 15'	Report	Magnússon (yellow card) 7'; Soltvedt (penalty missed) 14'; Sørensen (yellow card) 26'; Magnússon 28', 57'; Pedersen (yellow card) 40'	Stadium: Bravida Arena; Attendance: 4,516; Referee: Georgi Kabakov (Bulgaria)

14 August 2025 Second leg	Brann (Norway)	0–1 (2–1 agg.)	(Sweden) BK Häcken	Bergen, Norway
19:00 CEST	Mathisen (yellow card) 11'; Kornvig (yellow card) 62'; Castro (penalty missed) 90+2'	Report	Samuelsson (yellow card) 13'; Svanbäck (yellow card) 17'; De Roeve 38' (o.g.); Andersen (yellow card) 56'; Lindberg (yellow card) 61'; Layouni (yellow card) 90+7'	Stadium: Brann Stadion; Attendance: 14,750; Referee: Nick Walsh (Scotland)

==== Play-off round ====
The draw for the play-off round was held on 4 August 2025.

21 August 2025 First leg	Brann (Norway)	2–1	(Cyprus) AEK Larnaca	Bergen, Norway
19:00 CEST	Pedersen (yellow card) 4'; Myhre (yellow card) 14' (goal) 20'; Torsvik 90+3'	Report	Angielski 16'; Ivanović (yellow card) 45'; Ekpolo (yellow card) 73'; Bajić (yellow card) 90'	Stadium: Brann Stadion; Attendance: 14,750; Referee: Marco Guida (Italy)

27 August 2025 Second leg	AEK Larnaca (Cyprus)	0–4 (1–6 agg.)	(Norway) Brann	Larnaca, Cyprus
18:30 CEST	Saborit (red card) 39'	Report	Dyngeland (yellow card) 32'; Castro 45+1'; Sørensen (yellow card) 45+3'; Hansen 69'; Knudsen 75'; Soltvedt 87'	Stadium: AEK Arena – Georgios Karapatakis; Attendance: 4,665; Referee: Danny Makkelie (Netherlands)

==== League phase ====
The draw for the League phase was held on 29 August 2025.

Pos	Team	Pld	W	D	L	GF	GA	GD	Pts	Qualification
22	(Bulgarian Football Union) Ludogorets Razgrad	8	3	1	4	12	15	−3	10	Advance to knockout phase play-offs (unseeded)
23	(Croatian Football Federation) Dinamo Zagreb	8	3	1	4	12	16	−4	10	Advance to knockout phase play-offs (unseeded)
24	(Norwegian Football Federation) Brann	8	2	3	3	9	11	−2	9	Advance to knockout phase play-offs (unseeded)
25	(Swiss Football Association) Young Boys	8	3	0	5	10	16	−6	9	
26	(Austrian Football Association) Sturm Graz	8	2	1	5	5	11	−6	7	

Source: UEFA
Rules for classification: League phase tiebreakers

Round	1	2	3	4	5	6	7	8
Ground	A	H	H	A	A	H	H	A
Result	L	W	W	D	D	L		
Position	23	17	8	11	19	22		
Points	0	3	6	7	8	8		

Source: UEFA
A = Away; H = Home; W = Win; D = Draw; L = Loss

25 September 2025 1	Lille (France)	2–1	(Norway) Brann	Villeneuve-d'Ascq, France
18:45	Igamane 54'; Giroud 80'	Report	Magnússon 60'	Stadium: Stade Pierre-Mauroy; Attendance: 17,529; Referee: Allard Lindhout (Netherlands)

2 October 2025 2	Brann (Norway)	1–0	(Netherlands) Utrecht	Bergen, Norway
18:45	Magnússon 41'; Knudsen (yellow card) 81'; Dyngeland (yellow card) 88'	Report	Zechiël (yellow card) 88'; Bozdoğan (yellow card) 90+1'	Stadium: Brann Stadion; Attendance: 15,366; Referee: Aliyar Aghayev (Azerbaijan)

23 October 2025 3	Brann (Norway)	3–0	(Scotland) Rangers	Bergen, Norway
18:45	Kornvig 40'; Sørensen 55'; Pedersen (yellow card) 75'; Holm 79'	Report	Gassama (yellow card) 36'; Souttar (yellow card) 77'	Stadium: Brann Stadion; Attendance: 15,800; Referee: Vassilis Fotias (Greece)

6 November 2025 4	Bologna (Italy)	0–0	(Norway) Brann	Bologna, Italy
21:00	Lykogiannis (red card) 23'; Miranda (yellow card) 41'; Ferguson (yellow card) 46'; Italiano (yellow card) 84'	Report	Helland (yellow card) 45+1'; Pedersen (yellow card) 85'	Stadium: Stadio Renato Dall'Ara; Attendance: 22,508; Referee: Daniel Schlager (Germany)

27 November 2025 5	PAOK (Greece)	1–1	(Norway) Brann	Thessaloniki, Greece
18:45	Ivanušec (yellow card) 53' (goal) 64'; Despodov (yellow card) 90+1'	Report	Sørensen (yellow card) 12'; Kornvig 89'	Stadium: Toumba Stadium; Attendance: 16,005; Referee: Sascha Stegemann (Germany)

11 December 2025 6	Brann (Norway)	0–4	(Turkey) Fenerbahçe	Bergen, Norway
21:00	Helland (red card) 18'; Alexandersson (yellow card) 19'	Report	Aktürkoğlu 5'; Brown (yellow card) 14'; Talisca 36', 44', 65'	Stadium: Brann Stadion; Attendance: 15,620; Referee: Willy Delajod (France)

22 January 2026 7	Brann (Norway)	v	(Denmark) Midtjylland	Bergen, Norway
18:45		Report		Stadium: Brann Stadion

29 January 2026 8	Sturm Graz (Austria)	v	(Norway) Brann	Graz, Austria
21:00		Report		Stadium: Liebenauer Stadium

== Squad statistics ==
=== Appearances and goals ===
No.	Pos	Nat	Player	Total		Eliteserien		Norwegian Cup		UEFA Champions League		UEFA Europa League	
No.	Pos	Nat	Player	Apps	Goals	Apps	Goals	Apps	Goals	Apps	Goals	Apps	Goals
1	GK	(Norway) NOR	Mathias Dyngeland	43	0	30	0	1	0	2	0	10	0
3	DF	(Norway) NOR	Fredrik Pallesen Knudsen	26	1	17	0	1	0	0	0	8	1
4	DF	(Ghana) GHA	Nana Kwame Boakye	8	1	6	0	1	1	0	0	1	0
5	MF	(Norway) NOR	Sakarias Opsahl	0	0	0	0	0	0	0	0	0	0
6	DF	(Denmark) DEN	Japhet Sery Larsen	28	1	20	1	2	0	2	0	4	0
7	FW	(Denmark) DEN	Mads Hansen	35	5	24	0	4	4	2	0	5	1
8	MF	(Norway) NOR	Felix Horn Myhre	33	5	24	4	1	0	2	0	6	1
9	FW	(Chile) CHI	Niklas Castro	27	5	17	4	1	0	0	0	9	1
10	MF	(Denmark) DEN	Emil Kornvig	45	11	29	8	4	0	2	1	10	2
11	FW	(Norway) NOR	Bård Finne	41	10	26	6	4	4	2	0	9	0
12	GK	(Netherlands) NED	Tom Bramel	1	0	0	0	1	0	0	0	0	0
14	MF	(Norway) NOR	Ulrik Mathisen	37	2	26	2	1	0	2	0	8	0
15	DF	(Norway) NOR	Jonas Torsvik	7	1	4	0	2	0	0	0	1	1
17	DF	(Norway) NOR	Joachim Soltvedt	34	3	24	2	3	0	2	0	5	1
18	MF	(Denmark) DEN	Jacob Sørensen	23	2	12	1	0	0	2	0	9	1
19	MF	(Iceland) ISL	Eggert Aron Guðmundsson	43	5	28	5	4	0	2	0	9	0
20	DF	(Norway) NOR	Vetle Dragsnes	19	1	12	0	1	1	0	0	6	0
21	DF	(Belgium) BEL	Denzel De Roeve	43	4	28	3	3	1	2	0	10	0
22	FW	(Iceland) ISL	Sævar Atli Magnússon	16	10	9	5	0	0	2	1	5	4
23	MF	(Norway) NOR	Thore Pedersen	41	1	25	0	4	1	2	0	10	0
24	GK	(Norway) NOR	Mathias Klausen	0	0	0	0	0	0	0	0	0	0
25	MF	(Norway) NOR	Niklas Wassberg	0	0	0	0	0	0	0	0	0	0
26	DF	(Norway) NOR	Eivind Helland	43	0	28	0	3	0	2	0	10	0
27	MF	(Norway) NOR	Mads Sande	29	4	21	3	4	1	1	0	3	0
29	FW	(Norway) NOR	Noah Holm	15	2	9	1	1	0	0	0	5	1
32	MF	(Norway) NOR	Markus Haaland	28	3	14	2	5	1	1	0	8	0
39	FW	(Norway) NOR	Julian Lægreid	2	0	0	0	1	0	0	0	1	0
41	MF	(Norway) NOR	Lars Remmem	15	0	10	0	3	0	0	0	2	0
45	MF	(Norway) NOR	Jesper Nerhus Eikrem	2	0	0	0	2	0	0	0	0	0
Players away from Brann on loan:
2	DF	(Norway) NOR	Martin Hellan	0	0	0	0	0	0	0	0	0	0
43	DF	(Norway) NOR	Rasmus Holten	13	1	8	0	3	1	2	0	0	0
Players who appeared for Brann no longer at the club:
12	GK	(Norway) NOR	Martin Børsheim	2	0	0	0	2	0	0	0	0	0
20	FW	(Norway) NOR	Aune Heggebø	15	7	13	7	2	0	0	0	0	0
40	DF	(Norway) NOR	William Kvale	1	0	0	0	1	0	0	0	0	0

=== Goal scorers ===
Rank	Pos.	No.	Nat.	Player	Eliteserien	Norwegian Cup	UEFA Champions League	UEFA Europa League	Total
1	MF	10	(Denmark)	Emil Kornvig	8	0	1	2	11
2	FW	11	(Norway)	Bård Finne	6	4	0	0	10
2	FW	22	(Iceland)	Sævar Atli Magnússon	5	0	1	4	10
4	FW	20	(Norway)	Aune Heggebø	7	0	0	0	7
5	MF	8	(Norway)	Felix Horn Myhre	4	0	0	1	5
5	MF	7	(Denmark)	Mads Hansen	4	0	0	1	5
5	FW	9	(Chile)	Niklas Castro	4	0	0	1	5
5	MF	19	(Iceland)	Eggert Aron Guðmundsson	5	0	0	0	5
9	MF	27	(Norway)	Mads Sande	3	1	0	0	4
9	DF	21	(Belgium)	Denzel De Roeve	3	1	0	0	4
11	DF	17	(Norway)	Joachim Soltvedt	2	0	0	1	3
12	FW	32	(Norway)	Markus Haaland	2	0	0	0	2
12	FW	29	(Norway)	Noah Holm	1	0	0	1	2
12	MF	14	(Norway)	Ulrik Mathisen	2	0	0	0	2
12	MF	18	(Denmark)	Jacob Sørensen	1	0	0	1	2
16	DF	3	(Norway)	Fredrik Pallesen Knudsen	0	0	0	1	1
16	DF	23	(Norway)	Thore Pedersen	0	1	0	0	1
16	DF	6	(Denmark)	Japhet Sery Larsen	1	0	0	0	1
16	DF	43	(Norway)	Rasmus Holten	0	1	0	0	1
16	DF	15	(Norway)	Jonas Torsvik	0	0	0	1	1
16	DF	20	(Norway)	Vetle Dragsnes	0	1	0	0	1
16	DF	4	(Ghana)	Nana Kwame Boakye	0	1	0	0	1
TOTALS					58	10	2	14	84

=== Clean sheets ===
Rank	Pos.	No.	Nat.	Player	Eliteserien	Norwegian Cup	UEFA Champions League	UEFA Europa League	Total
1	GK	1	(Norway)	Mathias Dyngeland	5	0	0	5	10
2	GK	12	(Norway)	Martin Børsheim	0	2	0	0	2
TOTALS					5	2	0	5	12

=== Disciplinary record ===
No.	Pos.	Nat.	Name	Eliteserien		Norwegian Cup		UEFA Champions League		UEFA Europa League		Total	
No.	Pos.	Nat.	Name	Booked	Sent off (straight red)	Booked	Sent off (straight red)	Booked	Sent off (straight red)	Booked	Sent off (straight red)	Booked	Sent off (straight red)
18	MF	(Denmark)	Jacob Sørensen	7	1	0	0	2	0	2	0	12	1
10	MF	(Denmark)	Emil Kornvig	8	0	1	0	0	0	1	0	10	0
26	DF	(Norway)	Eivind Helland	7	1	0	0	1	0	1	1	9	2
23	DF	(Norway)	Thore Pedersen	4	0	0	0	0	0	4	0	8	0
8	MF	(Norway)	Felix Horn Myhre	4	0	0	0	1	0	1	0	6	0
6	DF	(Denmark)	Japhet Sery Larsen	3	1	0	0	2	0	0	0	5	1
3	DF	(Norway)	Fredrik Pallesen Knudsen	3	0	0	0	0	0	1	0	4	0
17	DF	(Norway)	Joachim Soltvedt	3	0	0	0	1	0	0	0	4	0
1	GK	(Norway)	Mathias Dyngeland	1	0	0	0	0	0	2	0	3	0
14	MF	(Norway)	Ulrik Mathisen	0	0	0	0	2	0	1	0	3	0
22	FW	(Iceland)	Sævar Atli Magnússon	1	0	0	0	1	0	1	0	3	0
21	DF	(Belgium)	Denzel De Roeve	2	0	0	0	0	0	0	0	2	0
27	MF	(Norway)	Mads Sande	1	0	1	0	0	0	0	0	2	0
9	FW	(Chile)	Niklas Castro	1	0	0	0	0	0	1	0	2	0
7	FW	(Denmark)	Mads Hansen	1	0	0	0	0	0	0	0	1	0
20	FW	(Norway)	Aune Heggebø	1	0	0	0	0	0	0	0	1	0
19	MF	(Iceland)	Eggert Aron Guðmundsson	1	0	0	0	0	0	0	0	1	0
41	MF	(Norway)	Lars Remmem	1	0	0	0	0	0	0	0	1	0
29	FW	(Norway)	Noah Holm	1	0	0	0	0	0	0	0	1	0
TOTALS				51	3	2	0	10	0	15	1	78	4
