= 2024 SK Brann season =

SK Brann
2024 season
- Chairman: Aslak Sverdrup
- Manager: Eirik Horneland
- Stadium: Brann Stadion
- Eliteserien: Runners-up
- Norwegian Football Cup: Third round
- UEFA Conference League: Play-off round
- Top goalscorer: League: Aune Heggebø (11 goals); All: Aune Heggebø (15 goals)
- Highest home attendance: 16,750 vs. Rosenborg; Eliteserien, 4 May 2024; 16,750 vs. Sandefjord; Eliteserien, 16 May 2024
- Lowest home attendance: 14,055 vs. Go Ahead Eagles (Note: Reduced capacity in UEFA-tournaments.); UEFA Conference League, 1 August 2024
- Average home league attendance: 15,758 (94.07%)
- Biggest win: 7–1 vs. Lyngbø (A); Norwegian Football Cup, 11 April 2024
- Biggest defeat: 1–5 vs. Bodø/Glimt (A); Eliteserien, 7 July 2024
Home colours	Away colours	Third colours
- All statistics correct as of 21 March 2025.

The 2024 season was SK Brann's 116th season and the club's second consecutive season in the top flight of Norwegian football. In addition to the domestic league, SK Brann participated in this season's edition of the Norwegian Football Cup and the UEFA Conference League.

== Players ==
=== First-team squad ===
As of 12 December 2024

Note: Flags indicate national team as defined under FIFA eligibility rules; some limited exceptions apply. Players may hold more than one non-FIFA nationality.

No.	Pos.	Nation	Player
1	GK	NOR	Mathias Dyngeland
2	DF	NOR	Martin Hellan
3	DF	NOR	Fredrik Pallesen Knudsen (captain)
5	MF	NOR	Sakarias Opsahl
6	DF	DEN	Japhet Sery Larsen
8	MF	NOR	Felix Horn Myhre
9	FW	CHI	Niklas Castro
10	MF	DEN	Emil Kornvig
11	FW	NOR	Bård Finne
12	GK	NOR	Martin Børsheim
13	DF	DEN	Svenn Crone
14	MF	NOR	Ulrik Mathisen
15	DF	NOR	Jonas Torsvik
16	MF	NOR	Ole Didrik Blomberg

No.	Pos.	Nation	Player
17	DF	NOR	Joachim Soltvedt
18	MF	NOR	Sander Kartum
20	FW	NOR	Aune Heggebø
21	DF	NOR	Ruben Kristiansen
22	FW	SWE	Moonga Simba
23	DF	NOR	Thore Pedersen
24	GK	NOR	Mathias Klausen
25	MF	NOR	Niklas Jensen Wassberg
26	DF	NOR	Eivind Helland
27	MF	NOR	Mads Sande
32	MF	NOR	Markus Haaland
36	GK	NOR	Eirik Holmen Johansen
41	MF	NOR	Lars Remmem
43	DF	NOR	Rasmus Holten

== Transfers ==
=== Winter ===
In: Note: Flags indicate national team as defined under FIFA eligibility rules; some limited exceptions apply. Players may hold more than one non-FIFA nationality.

No.	Pos.	Nation	Player
2	FW	NOR	Martin Hellan (from Kongsvinger)
10	MF	DEN	Emil Kornvig (from (Italy) Cittadella)
12	GK	NOR	Martin Børsheim (promoted from junior squad)
24	GK	NOR	Mathias Klausen (promoted from junior squad)
26	DF	NOR	Eivind Helland (promoted from junior squad)
—	GK	NOR	Eirik Holmen Johansen (from Eik Tønsberg)
41	FW	NOR	Elias Myrlid (loan return from Kongsvinger)

Out: Note: Flags indicate national team as defined under FIFA eligibility rules; some limited exceptions apply. Players may hold more than one non-FIFA nationality.

No.	Pos.	Nation	Player
10	MF	DEN	Frederik Børsting (to (Denmark) Vendsyssel)
12	GK	NOR	Eirik Holmen Johansen (released)
31	MF	NOR	Isak Tomar Hjorteseth (on loan to Sandnes Ulf, previously on loan at Åsane)
–	FW	NOR	Filip Møller Delaveris (released, previously on loan at Sandnes Ulf)
19	MF	NOR	Sivert Heltne Nilsen (to (Norway) Aberdeen FC)

=== Summer ===
In: Note: Flags indicate national team as defined under FIFA eligibility rules; some limited exceptions apply. Players may hold more than one non-FIFA nationality.

No.	Pos.	Nation	Player
5	MF	NOR	Sakarias Opsahl (from Tromsø)
43	DF	NOR	Rasmus Holten (loan return from Mjøndalen)

Out: Note: Flags indicate national team as defined under FIFA eligibility rules; some limited exceptions apply. Players may hold more than one non-FIFA nationality.

No.	Pos.	Nation	Player
7	FW	DEN	Magnus Warming (to (Denmark) Lyngby)
19	MF	NOR	Sivert Heltne Nilsen (to (Scotland) Aberdeen)

== Competitions ==
=== Overview ===
Competition	First match	Last match	Starting round	Final position	Record							
Competition	First match	Last match	Starting round	Final position	Pld	W	D	L	GF	GA	GD	Win %
Eliteserien	1 April 2024	1 December 2024	Matchday 1	2nd	30	17	8	5	55	33	+22	56.67
Norwegian Cup	11 April 2024	1 May 2024	First round	Third round	3	2	0	1	12	4	+8	66.67
UEFA Conference League	25 July 2024	29 August 2024	Second qualifying round	Play-off round	6	3	2	1	8	6	+2	50.00
Total					39	22	10	7	75	43	+32	56.41

Last updated: 1 December 2024
Source: Soccerway

=== Eliteserien ===
==== League table ====
Pos	Team	Pld	W	D	L	GF	GA	GD	Pts	Qualification or relegation
1	Bodø/Glimt (C)	30	18	8	4	71	31	+40	62	Qualification for the Champions League play-off round
2	Brann	30	17	8	5	55	33	+22	59	Qualification for the Champions League second qualifying round
3	Viking	30	16	9	5	61	39	+22	57	Qualification for the Conference League second qualifying round
4	Rosenborg	30	16	5	9	52	39	+13	53	Qualification for the Conference League second qualifying round
5	Molde	30	15	7	8	64	36	+28	52	

Source: Football Association of Norway (in Norwegian)
Rules for classification: 1) Points; 2) Goal difference; 3) Goals scored; 4) Head-to-head points; 5) Head-to-head goal difference; 6) Head-to-head goals scored.
(C) Champions

==== Results summary ====
Overall								Home						Away					
Pld	W	D	L	GF	GA	GD	Pts	W	D	L	GF	GA	GD	W	D	L	GF	GA	GD
30	17	8	5	55	33	+22	59	9	3	3	26	14	+12	8	5	2	29	19	+10

Last updated: 1 December 2024.

==== Results by round ====
Round	1	2	3	4	5	6	7	8	9	10	11	12	13	14	15	16	17	18	19	20	21	22	23	24	25	26	27	28	29	30
Ground	A	H	A	H	A	H	A	H	A	H	A	H	A	H	A	H	A	H	A	H	H	A	H	A	A	H	A	H	A	H
Result	W	L	D	W	D	W	W	W	D	L	W	D	L	D	D	W	W	W	W	W	L	D	W	W	W	W	W	W	L	D
Position	2	6	6	5	5	3	2	4	3	4	4	5	5	5	5	5	4	3	2	2	2	4	2	2	2	2	2	1	2	2

A = Away; H = Home; W = Win; D = Draw; L = Loss

==== Matches ====
The league fixtures were announced on 20 December 2023.

1 April 2024 1	Tromsø	2–4	Brann	Tromsø
17:00 CEST (UTC+2)	Jenssen (yellow card) 17' (yellow-red card) 77'; Antonsen (yellow card) 28'; Nordås 65', 73'	Report	Soltvedt 17' (pen.), 53'; Finne 24'; Sery Larsen (yellow card) 76'; Heggebø 84'	Stadium: Romssa Arena; Attendance: 4,890; Referee: Sigurd Smehus Kringstad

7 April 2024 2	Brann	0–2	Fredrikstad	Bergen
19:15 CEST (UTC+2)		Report	Aukland (yellow card) 32'; Traoré (yellow card) 35'; Molde 42', 72'; Magnússon (yellow card) 68'	Stadium: Brann Stadion; Attendance: 16,287; Referee: Ola Hobber Nilsen

14 April 2024 3	Viking	1–1	Brann	Stavanger
14:30 CEST (UTC+2)	Salvesen 22'; Bell (yellow card) 60'; Langås (yellow card) 66'	Report	Blomberg 71'; Kornvig (yellow card) 80'	Stadium: SR-Bank Arena; Attendance: 15,900; Referee: Tore Hansen

17 April 2024 16	Brann	1–0	HamKam	Bergen
17:00 CEST (UTC+2)	Heggebø 82'; Horneland (yellow card) 86'	Report	Ødegård (yellow card) 36'	Stadium: Brann Stadion; Attendance: 14,808; Referee: Marius Lien

21 April 2024 4	Brann	2–0	Odd	Bergen
17:00 CEST (UTC+2)	Kornvig 29' (pen.); Kartum (yellow card) 31'; Heggebø 90+4'	Report	Baccay (yellow card) 69'; Hussain (yellow card) 86'	Stadium: Brann Stadion; Attendance: 15,564; Referee: Mohammad Usman Aslam

28 April 2024 5	KFUM Oslo	1–1	Brann	Oslo
17:00 CEST (UTC+2)	Rasch (yellow card) 35'; Njie (yellow card) 45+5'; Hestnes (yellow card) 90+5'	Report	Finne (red card) 27'; Crone (yellow card) 79'; Sery Larsen (yellow card) 81'	Stadium: KFUM Arena; Attendance: 3,298; Referee: Marius Hansen Grøtta

4 May 2024 6	Brann	3–0	Rosenborg	Bergen
18:00 CEST (UTC+2)	Blomberg 3'; Heggebø (yellow card) 47' (goal) 49'; Castro 74'	Report	Yttergård Jenssen (yellow card) 35'; Nelson (yellow card) 86'	Stadium: Brann Stadion; Attendance: 16,750; Referee: Espen Eskås

12 May 2024 7	Lillestrøm	0–2	Brann	Lillestrøm
19:15 CEST (UTC+2)	Gabrielsen (yellow card) 35'; Roseth (yellow card) 43' (yellow-red card) 73'	Report	Blomberg (yellow card) 8'; S. H. Nilsen 59'; Soltvedt 68'; Kornvig (yellow card) 73'	Stadium: Åråsen Stadion; Attendance: 8,386; Referee: Tore Hansen

16 May 2024 8	Brann	2–1	Sandefjord	Bergen
18:00 CEST (UTC+2)	Finne 51'; Kornvig (yellow card) 57' (goal) 61'	Report	Nilsson (yellow card) 75'; Markovic (yellow card) 81'; Pedersen (yellow card) 90+1'; Mathisen 90+5'	Stadium: Brann Stadion; Attendance: 16,750; Referee: Rohit Saggi

20 May 2024 9	Kristiansund	2–2	Brann	Kristiansund
17:00 CEST (UTC+2)	Sivertsen 5' (pen.); Alte (yellow card) 47'; Jarl 53'	Report	Finne 13'; Myhre 79'	Stadium: Kristiansund Stadion; Attendance: 3,581; Referee: Mohammad Usman Aslam

26 May 2024 10	Brann	1–3	Molde	Bergen
19:15 CEST (UTC+2)	Knudsen 36'; Castro (yellow card) 68'; S. H. Nilsen (yellow card) 90+7'	Report	Amundsen (yellow card) 54'; Eriksen 60'; Wolff Eikrem 70'; Hestad 72'; Lund (yellow card) 88'	Stadium: Brann Stadion; Attendance: 16,317; Referee: Espen Eskås

29 May 2024 18	Brann	2–1	Kristiansund	Bergen
19:00 CEST (UTC+2)	S. H. Nilsen 38'; Crone (yellow card) 72'; Myhre (yellow card) 79'; Warming (yellow card) 90+1'; Soltvedt 90+9' (pen.)	Report	Alte (yellow card) 51' (goal) 69'	Stadium: Brann Stadion; Attendance: 14,538; Referee: Ola Hobber Nilsen

1 June 2024 11	HamKam	1–2	Brann	Hamar
18:00 CEST (UTC+2)	Kurtovic (yellow card) 9'; Mawa (yellow card) 11'; Simenstad 51'; Kjærgaard (yellow card) 90+5'	Report	Soltvedt 9' (pen.); Heltne Nilsen (yellow card) 29'; Crone (yellow card) 50'; Blomberg 74'; Kristiansen (yellow card) 85'; Sery Larsen (yellow card) 90+5'	Stadium: Briskeby Stadion; Attendance: 6,218; Referee: Mathias Støfringshaug

28 June 2024 12	Brann	0–0	Strømsgodset	Bergen
19:00 CEST (UTC+2)	Kristiansen (yellow card) 76'	Report	Ekeland (yellow card) 87'	Stadium: Brann Stadion; Attendance: 15,933; Referee: Sigurd Smehus Kringstad

7 July 2024 13	Bodø/Glimt	5–1	Brann	Bodø
14:30 CEST (UTC+2)	Saltnes 20'; Berg (yellow card) 22', (goal) 55', 78'; Gundersen 45+1'; Fet 89'	Report	Nilsen (yellow card) 6' (yellow-red card) 10'; Heggebø 90+3'	Stadium: Aspmyra Stadion; Attendance: 8,118; Referee: Ola Hobber Nilsen

13 July 2024 14	Brann	1–1	Haugesund	Bergen
19:15 CEST (UTC+2)	Castro (yellow card) 68'; Warming 72'	Report	Diarra (yellow card) 6'; Selvik (yellow card) 71'; Sery Larsen 84' (o.g.); Seone (yellow card) 88'; Tounekti (yellow card) 90+5'	Stadium: Brann Stadion; Attendance: 15,757; Referee: Marius Hansen Grøtta

20 July 2024 15	Sarpsborg 08	1–1	Brann	Sarpsborg
18:00 CEST (UTC+2)	Johansen (yellow card) 10'; Ørjasæter (yellow card) 15'; Wichne (yellow card) 77'; Meister 90+1'	Report	Myhre (yellow card) 80'; Knudsen (yellow card) 85'; Heggebø 90+4', (yellow card) 90+9'	Stadium: Sarpsborg Stadion; Attendance: 5,457; Referee: Marius Lien

4 August 2024 17	Strømsgodset	2–3	Brann	Drammen
17:00 CEST (UTC+2)	Tómasson 38'; Dahl (yellow card) 65'; Ardraa 90+2'; Melkersen (yellow card) 90+3'	Report	Finne 20'; Valsvik 22' (o.g.); Kartum 63'	Stadium: Marienlyst Stadion; Attendance: 5,601; Referee: Tore Hansen

18 August 2024 19	Fredrikstad	0–4	Brann	Fredrikstad
14:30 CEST (UTC+2)	Kvile (yellow card) 49'; Aukland (yellow card) 85'; Woledzi (yellow card) 90+4'	Report	Heggebø (yellow card) 43'; Kartum 44'; Sande 69'; Mathisen 80'; Finne 83'	Stadium: Fredrikstad Stadion; Attendance: 9,147; Referee: Rohit Saggi

1 September 2024 21	Brann	1–3	Sarpsborg 08	Bergen
19:15 CEST (UTC+2)	Castro 57' (pen.); Sery Larsen (yellow card) 65'	Report	Ørjasæter 10'; Sher (yellow card) 43'; Sandberg 63'; Johansen 78'; Hiim (yellow card) 90+2'	Stadium: Brann Stadion; Attendance: 14,307; Referee: Sigurd Smehus Kringstad

15 September 2024 22	Sandefjord	2–2	Brann	Sandefjord
17:00 CEST (UTC+2)	Sigurðarson 9'; Kristiansen (yellow card) 39'; Mettler (yellow card) 61', (goal) 65'	Report	Myhre 30'; Castro 90+2'	Stadium: Jotun Arena; Attendance: 4,144; Referee: Christian Moen

18 September 2024 20	Brann	2–0	KFUM Oslo	Bergen
19:00 CEST (UTC+2)	Castro 82' (pen.); Kartum 90+6'	Report	Haltvik (yellow card) 50'; H. Aleesami (yellow card) 66' (yellow-red card) 80'	Stadium: Brann Stadion; Attendance: 14,230; Referee: Svein Tore Sinnes

22 September 2024 23	Brann	4–1	Bodø/Glimt	Bergen
14:30 CEST (UTC+2)	Castro 19' (pen.), 90+6', (yellow card) 41'; Kornvig 27'; Kartum 45+3', (yellow card) 52'	Report	Evjen (yellow card) 7'; Berg (yellow card) 53'; Zinckernagel 57'	Stadium: Brann Stadion; Attendance: 16,551; Referee: Tore Hansen

28 September 2024 24	Haugesund	0–1	Brann	Haugesund
18:00 CEST (UTC+2)	Bizoza (yellow card) 56'; Tounekti (yellow card) 68'; Hope (yellow card) 88'	Report	Heggebø 36'; Castro (yellow card) 84'	Stadium: Haugesund Sparebank Arena; Attendance: 7,620; Referee: Marius Hansen Grøtta

20 October 2024 25	Rosenborg	1–2	Brann	Trondheim
14:30 CEST (UTC+2)	Nypan 53'	Report	Kornvig 7'; Kartum (yellow card) 44'; Heggebø 49' (pen.); Dyngeland (yellow card) 74'; Horn Myhre (yellow card) 90+3'	Stadium: Lerkendal Stadion; Attendance: 21,426; Referee: Ola Hobber Nilsen

27 October 2024 26	Brann	4–0	Tromsø	Bergen
19:15 CET (UTC+1)	Castro 27'; Kornvig 38'; Haugaard 54' (o.g.); Sery Larsen (yellow card) 82'; Finne 90+5' (pen.)	Report	Guddal (yellow card) 45'; Skjærvik (yellow card) 51'	Stadium: Brann Stadion; Attendance: 15,517; Referee: Christian Moen

3 November 2024 27	Odd	0–3	Brann	Skien
17:00 CET (UTC+1)		Report	Helland 42' (yellow card) 84'; Heggebø 44', 54'	Stadium: Skagerak Arena; Attendance: 5,752; Referee: Mohammad Usman Aslam

9 November 2024 28	Brann	2–1	Lillestrøm	Bergen
18:00 CET (UTC+1)	Heggebø 45+2'; Castro 90+3' (pen.)	Report	Krygård (yellow card) 35'; Jeahze (yellow card) 45'; Lundemo (yellow card) 55'; Karlsbakk 58'	Stadium: Brann Stadion; Attendance: 16,569; Referee: Ola Hobber Nilsen

23 November 2024 29	Molde	2–1	Brann	Molde
17:00 CET (UTC+1)	Lund (yellow card) 14'; Brynhildsen 41', 46' (yellow card) 48'	Report	Horn Myhre 57'; Soltvedt (yellow card) 71'	Stadium: Aker Stadion; Attendance: 9,248; Referee: Espen Eskås

1 December 2024 30	Brann	1–1	Viking	Bergen
17:00 CET (UTC+1)	Castro 76' (pen.); Kornvig (yellow card) 88'; Sery Larsen (yellow card) 90+2'	Report	Urbančič (yellow card) 13'; Tripić (yellow card) 57'; Christiansen 55'; Salvesen (yellow card) 70'; Heggheim (yellow card) 82'; Auklend (red card) 83'; Fuglestad (yellow card) 90+2'	Stadium: Brann Stadion; Attendance: 16,500; Referee: Rohit Saggi

=== Norwegian Football Cup ===
11 April 2024 First round	Lyngbø	1–7	Brann	Bergen
18:00 CEST (UTC+2)	A. T. Nilsen 79'	Report	Kornvig 1'; Crone 19'; Warming 37'; Heggebø 41', 47'; Finne 69'; Castro 90'	Stadium: Lyngbøparken; Attendance: 2,050; Referee: Jan Morten Tennøy

24 April 2024 Second round	Askøy	2–5	Brann	Strusshamn
18:00 CEST (UTC+2)	Aasbø 6', 29'; Knudsen (yellow card) 78'	Report	Heggebø 24'; Warming 25'; S. H. Nilsen (yellow card) 28'; Soltvedt 50' (pen.); Castro 54'; Kartum (yellow card) 55'; Blomberg 85'	Stadium: Follese Tertnes Holding Arena; Attendance: 3,415; Referee: Steinar Hauge

1 May 2024 Third round	Levanger	1–0	Brann	Levanger
14:30 CEST (UTC+2)	Gunnes 8'; Aksnes Olsen (yellow card) 19'; Andersen (yellow card) 66'; Aas (yellow card) 85'; Hajdari (yellow card) 85'	Report		Stadium: Moan Fritidspark; Attendance: 2,483; Referee: Stian Røvig Sletner

=== UEFA Conference League ===
==== Second qualifying round ====
The draw for the second qualifying round was held on 19 June 2024.

25 July 2024 First leg	Go Ahead Eagles (Netherlands)	0–0	(Norway) Brann	Deventer, Netherlands
18:30 CEST (UTC+2)	Llansana (red card) 90+1'; Adekanye (yellow card) 90+5'	Report	Kornvig (yellow card) 52'	Stadium: De Adelaarshorst; Attendance: 8,877; Referee: Denys Shurman (Ukraine)

1 August 2024 Second leg	Brann (Norway)	2–1 (2–1 agg.)	(Netherlands) Go Ahead Eagles	Bergen
19:00 CEST (UTC+2)	Finne 42'; Knudsen 62'; Soltvedt (yellow card) 83'	Report	Tengstedt 2'; de Lange (yellow card) 49'; Amofa (yellow card) 52'; Suray (yellow card) 85'; Edvardsen (yellow card) 90+4'	Stadium: Brann Stadion; Attendance: 14,055; Referee: Edgars Maļcevs (Latvia)

==== Third qualifying round ====
8 August 2024 First leg	St Mirren (Scotland)	1–1	(Norway) Brann	Paisley, Scotland
19:45 BST (UTC+1)	Fraser (yellow card) 8'; Mandron (yellow card) 36'; Balcombe (yellow card) 48'; Taylor (yellow card) 66'; Gogić (yellow card) 82'; Olusanya (yellow card) 85', (goal) 90'	Report	Myhre 75'	Stadium: St Mirren Park; Attendance: 7,023; Referee: Matthew De Gabriele (Malta)

15 August 2024 Second leg	Brann (Norway)	3–1 (4–2 agg.)	(Scotland) St Mirren	Bergen
19:00 CEST (UTC+2)	Soltvedt 5'; Finne (yellow card) 52'; Pedersen (yellow card) 69'; Myhre 85'; Heggebø 88'	Report	Idowu (yellow card) 56'; Taylor (yellow card) 58'; Smyth (yellow card) 71'; Iacovitti 74'; Gogić (yellow card) 84'	Stadium: Brann Stadion; Attendance: 14,500; Referee: Radoslav Gidzhenov (Bulgaria)

==== Play-off round ====
22 August 2024 First leg	Brann (Norway)	2–0	(Kazakhstan) Astana	Bergen
19:00 CEST (UTC+2)	Myhre 12'; Kornvig (yellow card) 48'; Finne 70'; Soltvedt (yellow card) 81'	Report	Ebong (yellow card) 44'; Bartolec (yellow card) 72'	Stadium: Brann Stadion; Attendance: 14,777; Referee: David Šmajc (Slovenia)

29 August 2024 Second leg	Astana (Kazakhstan)	3–0 (3–2 agg.)	(Norway) Brann	Almaty, Kazakhstan
19:00 KZT (UTC+5)	Amanović (yellow card) 45+1'; Chinedu 60', 81'; Karimov 90+1'; Dosmagambetov (yellow card) 90+5'	Report	Myhre (yellow card) 66'; Heggebø (yellow card) 72'; Soltvedt (yellow card) 77'	Stadium: Almaty Central Stadium; Attendance: 8,276; Referee: Aleksandar Stavrev ( Macedonia)
