= Jonas Torsvik =

Norwegian footballer (born 2005)

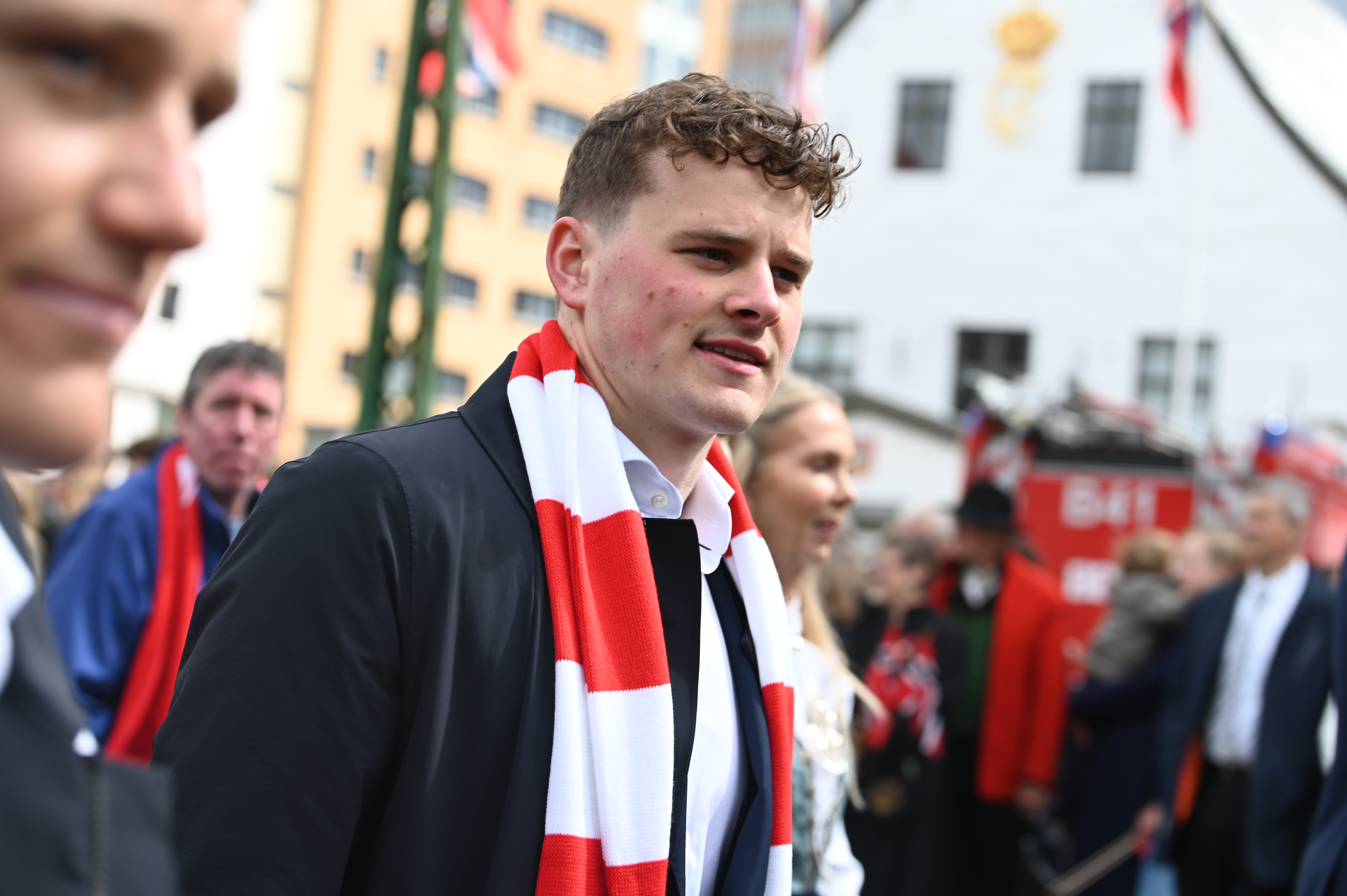

Personal information
- Full name: Jonas Tviberg Torsvik
- Date of birth: 24 May 2005 (age 21)
- Place of birth: Bergen, Norway
- Position: Left-back

Team information
- Current team: Brann
- Number: 15

Youth career
- –2018: Loddefjord
- 2020–2022: Brann

Senior career*
| Years | Team | Apps | (Gls) |
| 2021–2024 | Brann 2 | 25 | (2) |
| 2022– | Brann | 17 | (1) |

International career^{‡}
| 2021 | Norway U16 | 8 | (0) |
| 2022 | Norway U17 | 4 | (1) |
- * Club domestic league appearances and goals as of 9 October 2026 ‡ National team caps and goals as of 21 August 2025

Jonas Tviberg Torsvik (born 24 May 2005) is a Norwegian professional footballer who plays as a left-back for Brann in Eliteserien.

== Career ==
He hails from Drotningsvik. Torsvik spent his youth career at Loddefjord and Brann. He received his first senior call-up for Brann in a Norwegian Football Cup game against Voss on 18 May 2022, and made his league debut in August 2022, in the First Division against Raufoss. Torsvik then sustained a groin injury that sidelined him for nine months between late 2022 and early June 2023. He returned to Brann's first team for a 2023 cup game against Fjøra. As Brann dominated and won 8–1, Torsvik scored on a heavy shot, described as a "rocket", from 30 metres. Moreover, Brann's left back David Møller Wolfe was sold to the Netherlands that same summer.

Torsvik made his Eliteserien debut against Viking on 24 June 2023. Having barely resumed training with Brann following his lengthy injury, he made his starting debut on 2 July 2023. In the stoppage time of the first half, Torsvik stood on the edge of the opponents' box when the ball reached him, and he scored with a right-foot volley. A crowd of 14,000 became ecstatic, and Torsvik had no memory of the goal afterwards.

Playing against Strømsgodset on 16 July, Torsvik was accompanied by another 18-year old Rasmus Holten in defence, regarded as showing the prowess of Brann's academy. After the Strømsgodset match, however, the groin problems sidelined Torsvik yet again. He was surprisingly, given his situation, selected for Norway U18 in September 2023. Brann's manager Eirik Horneland believed that Torsvik probably should not have received medical clearance. Torsvik was injured on the first day of the training camp.

At the end of 2023 Torsvik was given the Young Player of the Year award by Brann's official supporter club. Torsvik agreed to a contract extension in December 2023, tying him to the club until 2026. However, he was still not training with the team in March 2024, as the 2024 Eliteserien campaign approached. His groin injury was compounded by late-teenage body growth. He was barely able to return to training, and play for the B team, in May–June 2024 before yet another absence. His second comeback of 2024 came in October, when he returned as a substitute for Brann's B team.

He did return to Brann's Eliteserien team in 2025, but was only able to feature in four games of the first two thirds of the season. However, after being sidelined for three months, he returned in Brann's 2025–26 UEFA Europa League playoff against AEK Larnaca. In the home leg, Torsvik scored the 2–1 goal that put Brann up before the away leg.

== Style of play ==
Torsvik is left-footed.

== Career statistics ==
As of 15 October 2026

Appearances and goals by club, season and competition
| Club | Season | League | | | National Cup | | Europe | | Total | |
| Club | Season | Division | Apps | Goals | Apps | Goals | Apps | Goals | Apps | Goals |
|---|---|---|---|---|---|---|---|---|---|---|
| Brann 2 | 2021 | 3. divisjon | 4 | 0 | — | | — | | 4 | 0 |
| Brann 2 | 2022 | 3. divisjon | 14 | 1 | — | | — | | 14 | 1 |
| Brann 2 | 2023 | 2. divisjon | 2 | 1 | — | | — | | 2 | 1 |
| Brann 2 | 2024 | 2. divisjon | 5 | 0 | — | | — | | 5 | 0 |
| Brann 2 | Total | | 25 | 2 | — | | — | | 25 | 2 |
| Brann | 2022 | 1. divisjon | 3 | 0 | 2 | 0 | — | | 5 | 0 |
| Brann | 2023 | Eliteserien | 4 | 1 | 3 | 1 | 0 | 0 | 7 | 2 |
| Brann | 2024 | Eliteserien | 0 | 0 | 0 | 0 | 0 | 0 | 0 | 0 |
| Brann | 2025 | Eliteserien | 4 | 0 | 2 | 0 | 1 (Note: Appearance in UEFA Europa League) | 1 | 7 | 1 |
| Brann | 2026 | Eliteserien | 6 | 0 | 0 | 0 | 1 (Note: Appearances in UEFA Conference League) | 0 | 7 | 0 |
| Brann | Total | | 17 | 1 | 7 | 1 | 2 | 1 | 26 | 3 |
| Career total | | | 42 | 3 | 7 | 1 | 2 | 1 | 51 | 5 |
