= Bob Harvie =

Bob Harvie may refer to:

- Bob Harvie (radio announcer) (died 2010), Sri Lankan cricket commentator
- Bob Harvie (politician), U.S. Representative-elect from Pennsylvania

== See also ==
- Robert Harvey (disambiguation)
