= Eggert Aron Guðmundsson =

Icelandic footballer (born 2004)

Personal information
- Date of birth: 8 February 2004 (age 22)
- Positions: Attacking midfielder; central midfielder

Team information
- Current team: SK Brann
- Number: 19

Youth career
- –2020: Stjarnan

Senior career*
Years	Team	Apps	(Gls)
2021–2023	Stjarnan	64	(18)
2024–2025	Elfsborg	7	(1)
2025–	SK Brann	34	(6)

International career^{‡}
2021–2023	Iceland U19	13	(2)
2023–	Iceland U21	19	(2)
2024–	Iceland	2	(0)
- * Club domestic league appearances and goals as of 9 October 2026 ‡ National team caps and goals as of 6 October 2026

Eggert Aron Guðmundsson (born 8 February 2004) is an Icelandic football player who plays as a midfielder for Bergensk club Brann and the Iceland national team.

== Club career ==
On 9 January 2024, Eggert Aron signed a contract with Swedish club Elfsborg until the summer of 2028.

== International career ==
Eggert Aron represented Iceland at the 2023 UEFA European Under-19 Championship.

Eggert Aron made his debut for the senior Iceland national team on 13 January 2024 in a friendly against Guatemala.

== Career statistics ==
=== Club ===
As of match played 15 October 2026

Appearances and goals by club, season and competition
Club	Season	League			National Cup		League Cup		Europe		Total	
Club	Season	Division	Apps	Goals	Apps	Goals	Apps	Goals	Apps	Goals	Apps	Goals
Sjartnan	2020	Besta deild karla	0	0	—		1	1	—		1	1
Sjartnan	2021	Besta deild karla	14	2	1	0	—		2 (Note: Appearances in UEFA Conference League)	0	17	2
Sjartnan	2022	Besta deild karla	25	4	1	0	—		—		26	4
Sjartnan	2023	Besta deild karla	25	12	3	1	2	0	—		30	13
Sjartnan	Total		64	18	4	1	3	1	2	0	73	20
Elfsborg	2024	Allsvenskan	7	1	1	0	—		2 (Note: Appearances in UEFA Europa League)	0	10	1
SK Brann	2025	Eliteserien	28	5	4	0	—		12 (Note: Two appearances in UEFA Champions League, ten appearances in UEFA Europa League)	0	44	5
SK Brann	2026	Eliteserien	6	1	0	0	—		7	0	13	1
SK Brann	Total		34	6	4	0	—		19	0	57	6
Career total			105	25	10	1	3	1	23	0	141	27

=== International ===
As of match played 18 January 2024

Appearances and goals by national team and year
National team	Year	Apps	Goals
Iceland	2024	2	0
Total		2	0
