= Markus Haaland =

Norwegian footballer (born 2005)

Personal information
- Full name: Markus Haaland
- Date of birth: 8 March 2005 (age 21)
- Place of birth: Bergen, Norway
- Height: 1.82 m (6 ft 0 in)
- Position: Midfielder

Team information
- Current team: Häcken
- Number: 14

Youth career
- –2018: Sædalen
- 2020–2024: Brann

Senior career*
Years	Team	Apps	(Gls)
2021–2025	Brann 2	67	(9)
2022–	Brann	24	(4)
2026–	→ Häcken (loan)	3	(0)

International career^{‡}
2021	Norway U16	8	(0)
2022	Norway U17	5	(1)
2025–	Norway U20	9	(0)
- * Club domestic league appearances and goals as of 29 August 2026 ‡ National team caps and goals as of 13 October 2025

Markus Haaland (born 8 March 2005) is a Norwegian footballer who plays as a midfielder for BK Häcken in the Allsvenskan on loan from Brann. Markus Haaland is not related to Erling Haaland. He previously played for Brann and, when joining the senior club in 2024, attracted attention due to his history as an active Brann supporter.

== International career ==
Haaland was called up to the Norwegian U20 team ahead of the 2025 FIFA U-20 World Cup in Chile. After a good Norwegian campaign, culminating in a quarter-final loss to France U20, Haaland played in all five games for the Norwegian team, starting four of them.

== Career statistics ==
As of 29 August 2026

Appearances and goals by club, season and competition
Club	Season	League			National Cup		Europe		Total	
Club	Season	Division	Apps	Goals	Apps	Goals	Apps	Goals	Apps	Goals
Brann 2	2021	3. divisjon	8	0	—		—		8	0
Brann 2	2022	3. divisjon	19	0	—		—		19	0
Brann 2	2023	2. divisjon	11	3	—		—		11	3
Brann 2	2024	2. divisjon	21	6	—		—		21	6
Brann 2	2025	2. divisjon	8	0	—		—		8	0
Brann 2	Total		67	9	—		—		67	9
Brann	2022	1. divisjon	0	0	1	1	—		1	1
Brann	2023	Eliteserien	0	0	0	0	0	0	0	0
Brann	2024	Eliteserien	1	0	0	0	0	0	1	0
Brann	2025	Eliteserien	13	2	4	0	9 (Note: One appearance in UEFA Champions League, eight appearances in UEFA Europa League)	0	26	2
Brann	2026	Eliteserien	10	2	4	0	5 (Note: Four appearances in UEFA Europa League, one appearance in UEFA COnference League)	0	19	2
Brann	Total		24	4	9	1	14	0	47	5
Häcken (loan)	2026	Allsvenskan	3	0	0	0	—		3	0
Career total			94	13	9	1	14	0	117	13

== Honours ==
Individual

- Eliteserien Goal of the Month: October 2025
