= Sævar Atli Magnússon =

Icelandic footballer (born 2000)

Personal information
- Full name: Sævar Atli Magnússon
- Date of birth: 16 June 2000 (age 26)
- Place of birth: Reykjavík, Iceland
- Height: 1.71 m (5 ft 7 in)
- Positions: Winger; striker

Team information
- Current team: SK Brann
- Number: 22

Youth career
- –2018: Leiknir Reykjavík

Senior career*
Years	Team	Apps	(Gls)
2015–2021	Leiknir Reykjavík	94	(41)
2021–2025	Lyngby	120	(19)
2025–	SK Brann	15	(5)

International career^{‡}
2016	Iceland U16	9	(0)
2016	Iceland U17	2	(0)
2017	Iceland U18	2	(0)
2018	Iceland U19	4	(0)
2021–2022	Iceland U21	11	(2)
2023–	Iceland	9	(0)
- * Club domestic league appearances and goals as of 9 October 2026 ‡ National team caps and goals as of 13 October 2025

Sævar Atli Magnússon (born 16 June 2000) is an Icelandic professional footballer who plays as a forward for Norwegian Eliteserien club SK Brann and the Iceland national team.

== Club career ==
Sævar Atli made his debut for Leiknir Reykjavík on 3 October 2015, aged 15, in the last round of the season, coming on as a substitute in a match against Keflavík. He signed for Danish club Lyngby on 5 August 2021 and was promoted with them to the Danish Superliga at the end of the 2021–22 season.

== International career ==
Sævar Atli has featured for the Icelandic U16, U17, U18, U19 and U21 youth sides.

== Career statistics ==
=== Club ===
As of match played 15 October 2026

Club	Season	League			National Cup (Note: Includes Icelandic Cup, Danish Cup)		Europe (Note: Includes UEFA Champions League, UEFA Europa League)		Total	
Club	Season	Division	Apps	Goals	Apps	Goals	Apps	Goals	Apps	Goals
Leiknir Reykjavík	2015	Úrvalsdeild	1	0	0	0	–		1	0
Leiknir Reykjavík	2016	1. deild karla	4	0	1	0	–		5	0
Leiknir Reykjavík	2017	1. deild karla	14	1	4	0	–		18	1
Leiknir Reykjavík	2018	1. deild karla	22	9	2	1	–		24	10
Leiknir Reykjavík	2019	1. deild karla	20	8	1	0	–		21	8
Leiknir Reykjavík	2020	1. deild karla	20	13	2	1	–		22	14
Leiknir Reykjavík	2021	Úrvalsdeild	13	10	1	0	–		14	10
Leiknir Reykjavík	Total		94	41	11	2	0	0	105	43
Lyngby	2021-22	Danish 1st Division	29	4	1	0	–		30	4
Lyngby	2022-23	Danish Superliga	28	6	1	0	–		29	6
Lyngby	2023-24	Danish Superliga	32	5	4	1	–		36	6
Lyngby	2024-25	Danish Superliga	31	4	1	0	–		32	4
Lyngby	Total		120	19	7	1	0	0	127	20
Brann	2025	Eliteserien	9	5	0	0	7 (Note: Includes 2 Champions League appearances and 5 Europa League appearances)	5 (Note: Includes 1 Champions League goal and 4 Europa League goals)	16	10
Brann	2026	Eliteserien	6	0	1	1	5 (Note: Appearances in UEFA Conference League)	0	12	1
Brann	Total		15	5	1	1	12	5	28	11
Career total			229	65	19	4	12	5	260	74

=== International ===
Appearances and goals by national team and year
National team	Year	Apps	Goals
Iceland	2023	5	0
Iceland	2024	0	0
Iceland	2025	4	0
Total		9	0
