= Fredrik Pallesen Knudsen =

Norwegian footballer (born 1996)

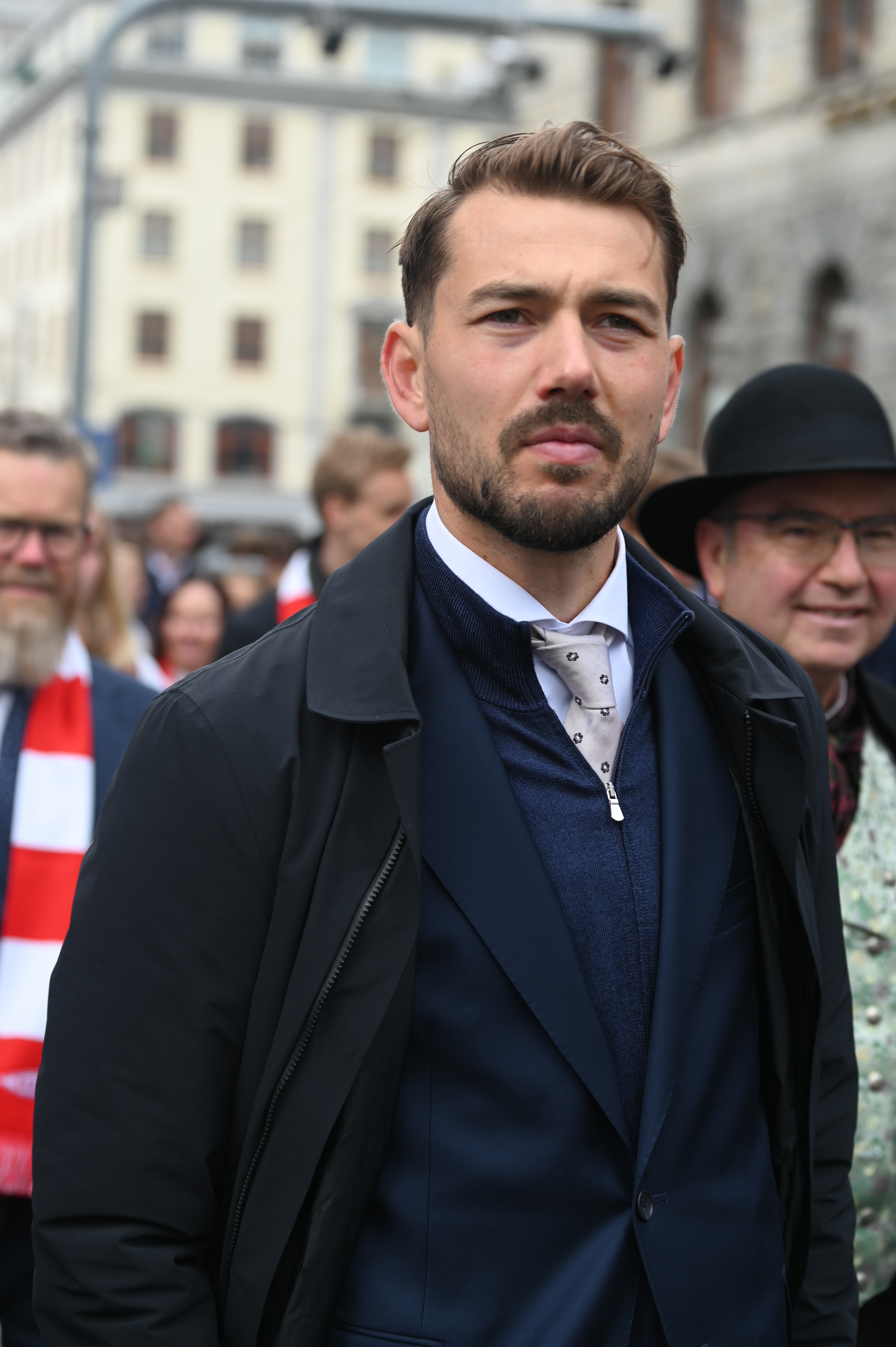

Personal information
- Date of birth: 30 August 1996 (age 30)
- Place of birth: Bergen, Norway
- Position: Defender

Team information
- Current team: Brann
- Number: 3

Youth career
- –2011: Djerv
- 2012–2014: Brann

Senior career*
Years	Team	Apps	(Gls)
2011	Djerv		
2015–2016	Brann	10	(0)
2016	→ Åsane (loan)	28	(1)
2017–2021	Haugesund	84	(4)
2021–	Brann	128	(6)

International career
2015	Norway U19	2	(0)
2017–2018	Norway U21	5	(0)
- * Club domestic league appearances and goals as of 9 October 2026

Fredrik Pallesen Knudsen (born 30 August 1996) is a Norwegian footballer who plays for and captains Brann.

He started his youth career in the Møhlenpris neighborhood club SK Djerv, and also played for its senior team in the 4. divisjon. Joining SK Brann's junior ranks in 2012, he finished his junior career as captain of the Brann team that won the 2014 Norwegian Junior Cup. Among his teammates who later became professional were Ådne Nissestad, Markus Olsen Pettersen, Emil Hansson, Joachim Soltvedt and Håkon Lorentzen. The next year he made his debut as a Norway youth international.

== Career statistics ==
=== Club ===
As of match played 15 October 2026

Appearances and goals by club, season and competition
Club	Season	League			National Cup		Europe		Total	
Club	Season	Division	Apps	Goals	Apps	Goals	Apps	Goals	Apps	Goals
Brann	2015	1. divisjon	10	0	3	0	–		13	0
Brann	Total		10	0	3	0	–		13	0
Åsane (loan)	2016	1. divisjon	28	1	1	0	–		29	1
Åsane (loan)	Total		28	1	1	0	–		29	1
Haugesund	2017	Eliteserien	26	0	1	0	3 (Note: Appearances in UEFA Europa League)	0	30	0
Haugesund	2018	Eliteserien	23	2	4	0	–		27	2
Haugesund	2019	Eliteserien	13	1	2	0	2	0	17	1
Haugesund	2020	Eliteserien	15	1	–		–		15	1
Haugesund	2021	Eliteserien	7	0	0	0	–		7	0
Haugesund	Total		84	4	7	0	5	0	96	4
Brann	2021	Eliteserien	11	1	0	0	–		11	1
Brann	2022	OBOS-ligaen	26	3	3	0	–		29	3
Brann	2023	Eliteserien	27	1	7	0	4 (Note: Appearances in UEFA Conference League)	2	38	3
Brann	2024	Eliteserien	27	1	3	0	6	1	36	2
Brann	2025	Eliteserien	17	0	1	0	8	0	26	0
Brann	2026	Eliteserien	20	0	6	0	11 (Note: Four appearances in UEFA Europa League, seven appearances in UEFA Conference League)	0	37	0
Brann	Total		128	6	20	0	29	3	177	9
Career total			250	11	31	0	34	3	315	14
