= Emil Kornvig =

Danish footballer (born 2000)

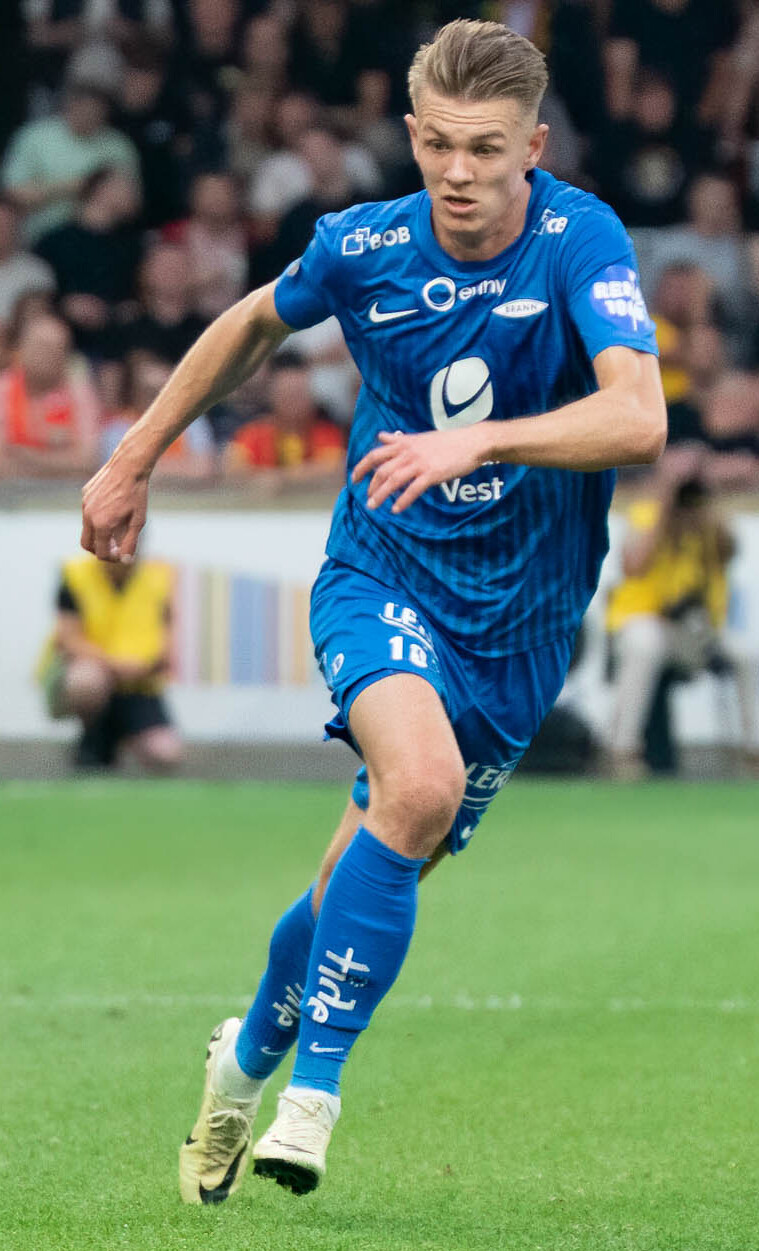
- Kornvig with Brann in 2024

Personal information
- Full name: Emil Nestved Kornvig
- Date of birth: 28 April 2000 (age 26)
- Place of birth: Søborg, Denmark
- Height: 1.85 m (6 ft 1 in)
- Position: Attacking midfielder

Team information
- Current team: Widzew Łódź
- Number: 8

Youth career
- Copenhagen
- 2016–2019: Lyngby

Senior career*
Years	Team	Apps	(Gls)
2019–2021	Lyngby	24	(0)
2021–2023	Spezia	0	(0)
2021–2022	→ SønderjyskE (loan)	23	(2)
2022–2023	→ Cosenza (loan)	14	(1)
2023–2024	Cittadella	12	(0)
2024–2026	Brann	59	(13)
2026–	Widzew Łódź	15	(2)
- * Club domestic league appearances and goals as of 11:17, 21 May 2026 (UTC)

Emil Nestved Kornvig (Danish pronunciation: [ˈkʰoɐ̯nˌviˀ]; born 28 April 2000) is a Danish professional footballer who plays as a attacking midfielder for Polish Ekstraklasa club Widzew Łódź.

== Career ==
=== Lyngby Boldklub ===
Kornvig progressed through the Lyngby Boldklub youth academy, before permanently being promoted to the first team in 2020. He tested positive for COVID-19 without symptoms on 23 September 2020 ahead of Lyngby's match against FC Nordsjælland. On 18 January 2021, he signed a contract extension keeping him at the club until 30 June 2024. He suffered relegation to the Danish 1st Division with the club on 9 May 2021 after a loss to last placed AC Horsens.

=== Spezia ===
On 26 July 2021 he joined Serie A side Spezia.

==== Loan to SønderjyskE ====
On the same day where he joined Spezia he went to SønderjyskE on loan.

==== Loan to Cosenza ====
On 1 September 2022, Kornvig joined Cosenza on loan with an option to buy.

=== Cittadella ===
On 1 August 2023, Kornvig signed with Serie B club Cittadella.

=== Brann ===
After only half a season at Cittadella, Kornvig moved on to Norwegian top-flight club Brann in on 16 February 2024.

=== Widzew Łódź ===
On 23 January 2026, Kornvig joined Polish Ekstraklasa club Widzew Łódź for a reported fee of €2.3 million, signing a three-and-a-half-year deal.

== Career statistics ==
As of match played 15 May 2026

Appearances and goals by club, season and competition
Club	Season	League			National cup (Note: Includes Danish Cup, Coppa Italia, Norwegian Football Cup, Polish Cup)		Europe		Total	
Club	Season	Division	Apps	Goals	Apps	Goals	Apps	Goals	Apps	Goals
Lyngby	2019–20	Danish Superliga	2	0	0	0	—		2	0
Lyngby	2020–21	Danish Superliga	22	0	1	0	—		23	0
Lyngby	Total		24	0	1	0	—		25	0
Sønderjyske (loan)	2021–22	Danish Superliga	23	2	5	0	—		28	2
Cosenza (loan)	2022–23	Serie B	14	1	0	0	—		14	1
Cittadella	2023–24	Serie B	12	0	2	0	—		14	0
Brann	2024	Eliteserien	30	5	3	1	6 (Note: Appearances in UEFA Conference League)	0	39	6
Brann	2025	Eliteserien	29	8	4	0	12 (Note: Two appearances and one goal in UEFA Champions League, ten appearances and two goals in UEFA Europa League)	3	45	11
Brann	2026	Eliteserien	—		—		1 (Note: Appearance in UEFA Europa League)	1	1	1
Brann	Total		59	13	7	1	19	4	85	18
Widzew Łódź	2025–26	Ekstraklasa	15	2	1	0	—		16	2
Career total			133	18	13	1	19	4	165	23
