= Bob Harvey =

Bob Harvey may refer to:

- Bob Harvey (mayor) (born 1940), former mayor of Waitakere City, New Zealand
- Bob Harvey (musician) (1934–2025), member of the band Jefferson Airplane
- Bob Harvey (baseball) (1918–1992), American outfielder in Negro league baseball
- Bob Harvey, the captain of the pirate ship the Speedy in Jules Verne's The Mysterious Island

== See also ==
- Robert Harvey (disambiguation)
- Bob Harvie (disambiguation)
