= Felix Horn Myhre =

Norwegian footballer (born 1999)

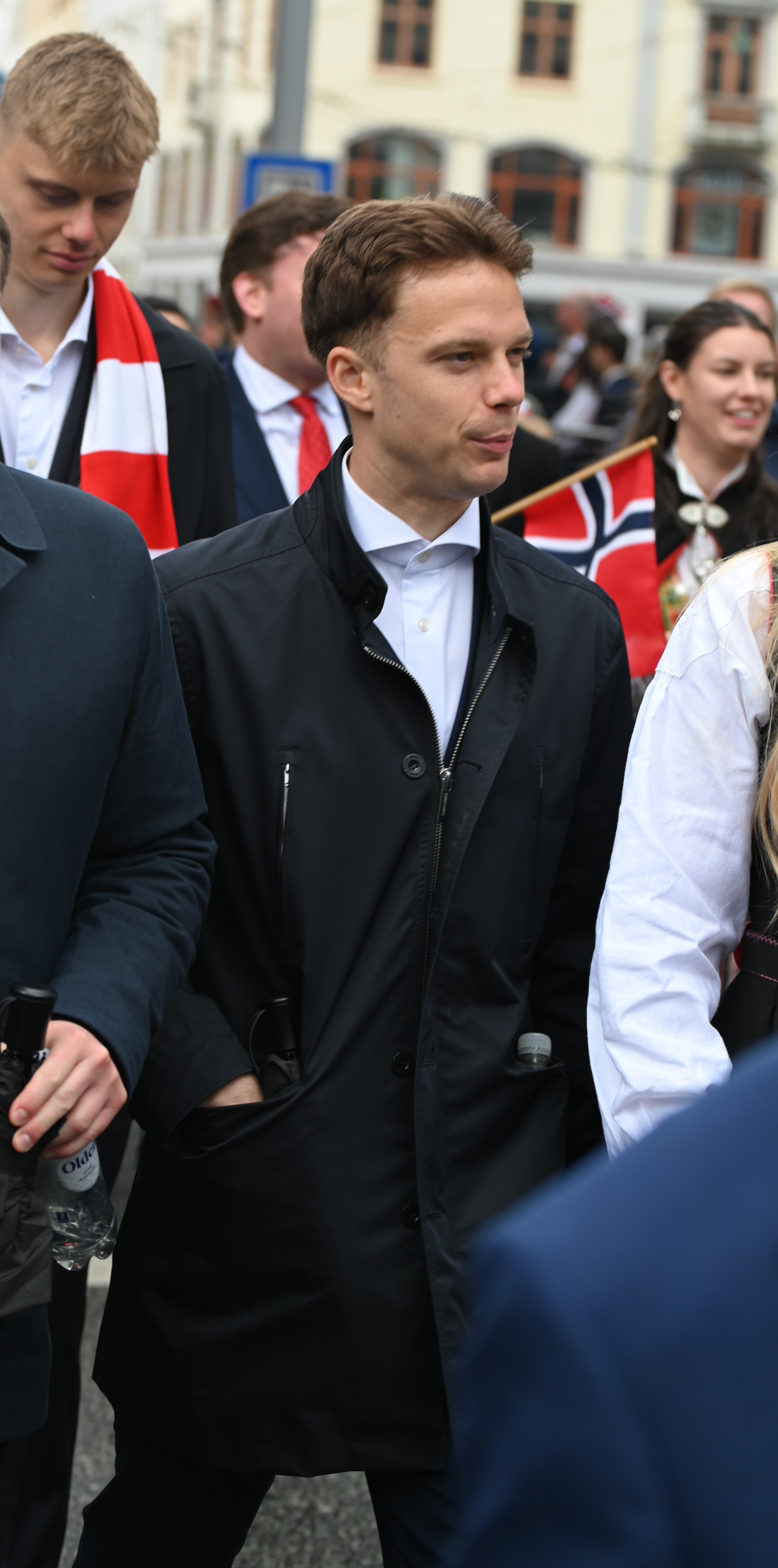
- Horn Myhre in 2026

Personal information
- Full name: Felix Horn Myhre
- Date of birth: 4 March 1999 (age 27)
- Place of birth: Oslo, Norway
- Height: 1.80 m (5 ft 11 in)
- Position: Central midfielder

Team information
- Current team: West Bromwich Albion
- Number: 7

Youth career
- Vestre Aker
- –2016: Ullern

Senior career*
Years	Team	Apps	(Gls)
2014	Ullern 2	10	(1)
2014–2016	Ullern	37	(0)
2017–2021	Vålerenga 2	49	(6)
2017–2021	Vålerenga	68	(3)
2019	→ Bodø/Glimt (loan)	2	(0)
2021–2026	Brann	139	(20)
2022	Brann 2	4	(3)
2026–	West Bromwich Albion	11	(2)

International career^{‡}
2014	Norway U15	2	(0)
2015	Norway U16	16	(0)
2016	Norway U17	6	(0)
2018	Norway U19	1	(0)
2019	Norway U20	2	(0)
2018–2019	Norway U21	3	(0)
2024–	Norway	8	(2)
- * Club domestic league appearances and goals as of 13:03, 4 November 2026 (UTC) ‡ National team caps and goals as of 14 November 2026

Felix Horn Myhre (born 4 March 1999) is a Norwegian professional footballer who plays as a central midfielder for EFL Championship club West Bromwich Albion and the Norway national team.

== Club career ==
=== Early career ===
As a child, Horn Myhre played for Vestre Aker, a local club in Oslo, and was coached by former Norway international Jan-Derek Sørensen. Horn Myhre's father remembers that Sørensen was the first one to point out his son's football talent. He would later go on to play for Ullern, where he would be capped thirty-seven times in the Norwegian Second Division, and Norwegian Third Division.

At a young age, Horn Myhre trained with one of Barcelona's youth teams, and later was on a trial with Freiburg's U19 and U23 teams.

=== Vålerenga ===
After several good seasons at Ullern, Dutch club Ajax wanted to sign Horn Myhre, but before signing him, wanted to have him on a week of training with the club first. This gave Eliteserien club Vålerenga the time to snap him up first, and on 5 January 2017, Horn Myhre signed a two-year contract with the club. His first season would see Horn Myhre play mostly for Vålerenga's second team in the Norwegian Second Division, but in October he would finally get his debut for the first team, in a 3–0 win over Haugesund, after being subbed on in the 88th minute.

On the last day of January 2019, Horn Myhre signed a new contract with Vålerenga, lasting until the summer of 2021 Later that year, in early April 2019, Horn Myhre was loaned out to Bodø/Glimt. Originally the loan was meant to last until 17 May, but in early May, Horn Myhre returned to Vålerenga, after only three appearances. The 2020 season culminated with a bronze medal for Horn Myhre and Vålerenga, their best place in the league for ten years.

=== Brann ===
On 30 April 2021, media reported that Brann had signed a pre-contract with Horn Myhre, as his contract with Vålerenga was ending on 30 June. This was later confirmed by Brann's head coach Kåre Ingebrigtsen. Two weeks later, after the transfer deadline, Brann confirmed that they had signed Horn Myhre from 1 July. Initially Brann had wanted to buy Horn Myhre out of his contract with Vålerenga to bring him to Bergen immediately, but talks with Vålerenga had failed. Additionally, because the summer transfer window didn't open until 1 August, Horn Myhre would not be able to play any official games for Brann until that date. His first game would come on 1 August, playing the full game in a 3–0 cup tie win against Fana.

In his first season at Brann, the club struggled and eventually finished fifteenth in the Eliteserien, resulting in being relegated to the Norwegian First Division. The next two seasons Horn Myhre played almost every league game. In July 2023, with only a year-and-a-half left on his original contract, Horn Myhre signed an extension with the club, running through the 2027 season. After the 2024 season, Horn Myhre was named Brann Player of the Season from Brann's supporter group Bataljonen.

Ahead of the 2025 season, Horn Myhre was named as Brann's new vice-captain. After Brann's second place in the 2024 Eliteserien, Brann was qualified to play European football in the 2025–26 season. In the play-off round, Horn Myhre scored against AEK Lacarna in a 2–1 win at home, that would eventually lead Brann to their first UEFA Europa League in eighteen years.

At the end of the summer transfer window in 2025, after several rejected bids from newly promoted La Liga side Elche, Horn Myhre's former club Bodø/Glimt tried to sign him for 40,000,000 NOK. In the media Horn Myhre was open about wanting the move, and that playing UEFA Champions League football and a new challenge was his main reason for his interest in the move. Brann would go on to reject the bid, and Horn Myhre would stay at Brann. Later, Horn Myhre apologized to the fans, although he stressed that he had meant what he said, but that it could have been kept out of the media.

=== West Bromwich Albion ===
On 5 August 2026, Horn Myhre joined Championship side West Bromwich Albion on a three-year contract for an undisclosed fee.

== International career ==
From 2014 until 2016, Horn Myhre played for several of Norway's different youth teams, including sixteen games for Norway U16 in 2015. On 4 July 2018 Horn Myhre was called up to the 2018 UEFA European Under-19 Championship in Finland. Norway U19 was eliminated in the group stages, and Horn Myhre only played their opening game, a 3–1 defeat to Portugal U19. Additionally, Horn Myhre played three games for Norway U21, including his debut against Turkey U21.

His first call up for Norway came on 27 August 2024 for their matches in the 2024–25 UEFA Nations League B. In Norway's first game in the group they drew Kazakhstan, and Horn Myhre started in midfield with Patrick Berg and Martin Ødegaard. Only three days after his debut, he would score his first goal for the national team, the first goal in Norway's 2–1 win over Austria. Exactly one year later, on 9 September 2025, he would score his second goal for the national team, the first goal in a 11–1 thrashing of Moldova.

== Career statistics ==
=== Club ===
As of match played 3 November 2026

Appearances and goals by club, season and competition
Club	Season	League			National cup (Note: Includes Norwegian Cup, FA Cup)		League cup (Note: Includes EFL Cup)		Europe		Other		Total	
Club	Season	Division	Apps	Goals	Apps	Goals	Apps	Goals	Apps	Goals	Apps	Goals	Apps	Goals
Ullern 2	2014	4. divisjon	10	1	—		—		—		—		10	1
Ullern	2014	3. divisjon	8	0	0	0	—		—		—		8	0
Ullern	2015	2. divisjon	20	0	1	0	—		—		—		21	0
Ullern	2016	2. divisjon	9	0	1	1	—		—		—		10	1
Ullern	Total		37	0	2	1	—		—		—		39	1
Vålerenga 2	2017	2.divisjon	14	0	—		—		—		—		14	0
Vålerenga 2	2018	2. divisjon	15	4	—		—		—		—		15	4
Vålerenga 2	2019	3. divisjon	12	1	—		—		—		—		12	1
Vålerenga 2	2020	2. divisjon	6	1	—		—		—		—		6	1
Vålerenga 2	2021	2. divisjon	2	0	—		—		—		—		2	0
Vålerenga 2	Total		49	6	—		—		—		—		49	6
Vålerenga	2017	Eliteserien	2	0	0	0	—		—		—		2	0
Vålerenga	2018	Eliteserien	19	3	5	0	—		—		—		24	3
Vålerenga	2019	Eliteserien	17	0	2	0	—		—		—		19	0
Vålerenga	2020	Eliteserien	24	0	—		—		—		—		24	0
Vålerenga	2021	Eliteserien	6	0	0	0	—		0	0	—		6	0
Vålerenga	Total		68	3	7	0	—		0	0	—		75	3
Bodø/Glimt (loan)	2019	Eliteserien	2	0	1	0	—		—		—		3	0
Brann	2021	Eliteserien	15	0	1	0	—		—		—		16	0
Brann	2022	1. divisjon	28	7	3	2	—		—		—		31	9
Brann	2023	Eliteserien	30	4	8	2	—		4 (Note: Appearances in UEFA Conference League)	1	—		42	7
Brann	2024	Eliteserien	27	3	2	0	—		5	3	—		34	6
Brann	2025	Eliteserien	24	4	1	0	—		8 (Note: Two appearances in UEFA Champions League, six appearances and one goal in UEFA Europa League)	1	—		33	5
Brann	2026	Eliteserien	15	2	4	2	—		6 (Note: Four appearances in Europa League, Two appearances and one goal in UEFA Conference League)	1	—		25	5
Brann	Total		139	20	19	6	—		23	6	—		181	32
Brann 2	2022	3. divisjon	4	3	—		—		—		—		4	3
West Bromwich Albion	2026–27	EFL Championship	11	2	0	0	2	1	—		—		13	3
Career total			318	34	29	7	2	1	23	6	—		372	48

=== International ===
As of match played 14 November 2026

Appearances and goals by national team and year
National team	Year	Apps	Goals
Norway	2024	3	1
Norway	2025	2	1
Norway	2026	3	0
Total		8	2

As of match played 14 November 2026
Norway score listed first, score column indicates score after each Horn Myhre goal.

International goals by date, venue, cap, opponent, score, result and competition
No.	Date	Venue	Cap	Opponent	Score	Result	Competition	Ref.
1	9 September 2024	Ullevaal Stadion, Oslo, Norway	2	Austria	1–0	2–1	2024–25 UEFA Nations League B	
2	9 September 2025	Ullevaal Stadion, Oslo, Norway	5	Moldova	1–0	11–1	2026 FIFA World Cup qualification	

== Honours ==
Brann

- Norwegian Cup: 2022

Individual

- Eliteserien Goal of the Month: September 2025
