= Jacob Sørensen (footballer, born 1998) =

Danish footballer

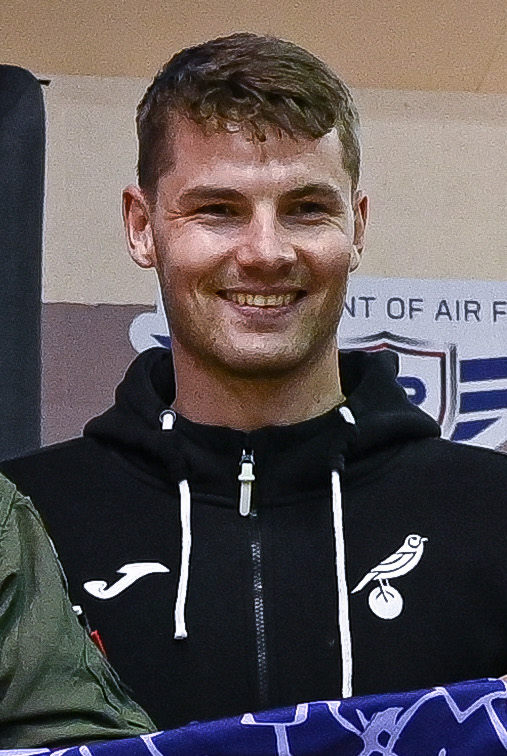
- Sørensen with Norwich City in 2024

Personal information
- Full name: Jacob Kirk Lungi Sørensen
- Date of birth: 3 March 1998 (age 28)
- Place of birth: Esbjerg, Denmark
- Height: 1.84 m (6 ft 0 in)
- Position: Defensive midfielder

Team information
- Current team: Brann
- Number: 18

Youth career
- –2008: SGI Fodbold
- 2008–2016: Esbjerg fB

Senior career*
Years	Team	Apps	(Gls)
2016–2020	Esbjerg fB	104	(5)
2020–2025	Norwich City	100	(3)
2025–	Brann	31	(1)

International career^{‡}
2015	Denmark U18	2	(0)
2017–2019	Denmark U20	6	(0)
2018–2019	Denmark U21	7	(0)
- * Club domestic league appearances and goals as of 9 October 2026 ‡ National team caps and goals as of 01:57, 5 March 2020 (UTC)

Jacob Kirk Lungi Sørensen (born 3 March 1998) is a Danish professional footballer who plays as a midfielder for Eliteserien club SK Brann.

== Club career ==
=== Esbjerg fB ===
Sørensen made his senior league debut for Esbjerg fB on 1 December 2016 in a Danish Superliga match away to Odense. The final score was 1–0 for Esbjerg fB. During his time at the club, he made 117 appearances and scored a total of 8 goals.

=== Norwich City ===
On 20 July 2020, Sørensen signed a three-year contract with Norwich City. He made his debut against Brentford as a late replacement for Xavi Quintillà at left back, a position he had never played at before. Sørensen scored his first goal for Norwich in a 2–1 win against Nottingham Forest on 9 December. On 15 July 2021, after Norwich's Championship title winning season in which he made 32 league appearances, Sørensen signed a new contract until June 2024. On 28 April 2025, Norwich announced that Sørensen would be released when his contract expired at the end of the 2024‍–‍25 season.

=== Brann ===
On 7 July 2025, Sørensen joined Eliteserien club Brann on a three-year deal.

== Career statistics ==
=== Club ===
As of match played 15 October 2026

Appearances and goals by club, season and competition
Club	Season	League			National cup (Note: Includes Danish Cup, FA Cup)		League cup (Note: Includes EFL Cup)		Europe		Other		Total	
Club	Season	Division	Apps	Goals	Apps	Goals	Apps	Goals	Apps	Goals	Apps	Goals	Apps	Goals
Esbjerg fB	2016–17	Danish Superliga	8	0	1	1	—		0	0	3 (Note: Appearances in Danish Superliga Relegation play-offs)	1	12	2
Esbjerg fB	2017–18	Danish 1st Division	31	1	1	0	—		0	0	—		32	1
Esbjerg fB	2018–19	Danish Superliga	36	3	3	0	—		0	0	—		39	3
Esbjerg fB	2019–20	Danish Superliga	29	1	3	1	—		2 (Note: Appearances in UEFA Europa League)	0	—		34	2
Esbjerg fB	Total		104	5	8	2	—		2	0	3	1	117	8
Norwich City	2020–21	Championship	32	1	0	0	2	0	—		—		34	1
Norwich City	2021–22	Premier League	10	0	1	0	1	0	—		—		12	0
Norwich City	2022–23	Championship	19	1	0	0	1	1	—		—		20	2
Norwich City	2023–24	Championship	14	1	3	0	0	0	—		1 (Note: Appearances in Championship play-offs)	0	18	1
Norwich City	2024–25	Championship	25	0	0	0	0	0	—		0	0	25	0
Norwich City	Total		100	3	4	0	4	1	—		1	0	109	4
Brann	2025	Eliteserien	12	1	0	0	—		11 (Note: Two appearances in UEFA Champions League, nine appearances and one goal in UEFA Europa League)	1	—		23	2
Brann	2026	Eliteserien	19	0	6	2	—		10 (Note: Four appearances in UEFA Europa League, six appearances in UEFA Conference League)	0	—		35	2
Brann	Total		31	1	6	2	—		21	1	—		58	4
Career total			234	9	18	4	4	1	23	1	4	1	278	16

== Honours ==
Norwich City

- EFL Championship: 2020–21
