= Denzel De Roeve =

Belgian footballer (born 2004)

Personal information
- Date of birth: 10 August 2004 (age 22)
- Height: 1.77 m (5 ft 10 in)
- Position: Right-back

Team information
- Current team: Union Saint-Gilloise
- Number: 21

Youth career
- Eendracht Aalst
- Club Brugge

Senior career*
Years	Team	Apps	(Gls)
2021–2025	Club NXT	65	(2)
2025–2026	Brann	40	(4)
2026–	Union Saint-Gilloise	7	(1)

International career^{‡}
2019	Belgium U15	1	(0)
2019–2020	Belgium U16	3	(0)
2021	Belgium U18	8	(0)
2025–	Belgium U21	5	(0)
- * Club domestic league appearances and goals as of 25 October 2026 ‡ National team caps and goals as of 15:25, 18 November 2026 (UTC)

Denzel De Roeve (born 10 August 2004) is a Belgian professional footballer who plays as a right-back for Belgian Pro League club Union Saint-Gilloise.

== Career statistics ==
=== Club ===
As of 25 October 2026.

Appearances and goals by club, season and competition
Club	Season	League			Cup		Europe		Other		Total	
Club	Season	Division	Apps	Goals	Apps	Goals	Apps	Goals	Apps	Goals	Apps	Goals
Club NXT	2020–21	Challenger Pro League	10	0	–		–		–		10	0
Club NXT	2022–23	Challenger Pro League	27	0	–		–		–		27	0
Club NXT	2023–24	Challenger Pro League	12	1	–		–		–		12	1
Club NXT	2024–25	Challenger Pro League	16	1	–		–		–		16	1
Club NXT	Total		65	2	–		–		–		65	2
Brann	2025	Eliteserien	28	3	2	0	12 (Note: Two appearances in UEFA Champions League, ten appearances in UEFA Europa League)	0	–		42	3
Brann	2026	Eliteserien	12	1	5	0	10 (Note: Four appearances in UEFA Europa League, six appearances in UEFA Conference League)	0	–		27	1
Brann	Totalt		40	4	7	0	22	0	–		69	4
Union Saint-Gilloise	2026–27	Belgian Pro League	7	1	1	0	3 (Note: Appearances in UEFA Europa League)	0	–		11	1
Career total			104	6	8	0	26	0	0	0	138	6

== Honours ==
Individual

- Eliteserien Goal of the Month: August 2025
