= Niklas Castro =

Chilean footballer (born 1996)

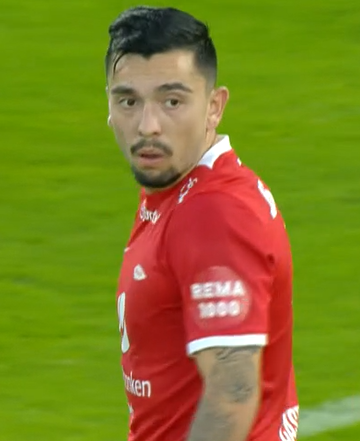
- Castro with Brann in 2023

Personal information
- Full name: Niklas Fernando Nygård Castro
- Date of birth: 8 January 1996 (age 30)
- Place of birth: Oslo, Norway
- Height: 1.73 m (5 ft 8 in)
- Position: Left winger

Team information
- Current team: Brann
- Number: 9

Youth career
- Manglerud Star
- Vålerenga

Senior career*
Years	Team	Apps	(Gls)
2016–2017	Vålerenga	9	(0)
2017–2018	Kongsvinger	53	(22)
2019–2022	Aalesund	73	(28)
2022–	Brann	104	(33)

International career^{‡}
2020	Chile	1	(0)
- * Club domestic league appearances and goals as of 20 September 2026 ‡ National team caps and goals as of 13 November 2020

Niklas Fernando Nygård Castro (born 8 January 1996) is a professional footballer who plays as a left winger for Brann. Born in Norway, he has represented the Chile national team.

== Club career ==
Castro played youth football for Manglerud Star. Ahead of the 2016 he was drafted into the senior team of first-tier club Vålerenga. He made his Norwegian top division debut in April 2016 against Stabæk.

Already on 15 June 2018, Castro signed with Aalesund for the 2019 season. The contract was until 2021.

== International career ==
Due to his Chilean heritage, on 3 October 2019, Castro was officially called up to the Chile national team for friendly matches against Colombia and Guinea. Since he did not have Chilean nationality at the time, he was included in the squad as a "special guest" according to manager Reinaldo Rueda.

On 27 February 2020, it was confirmed Castro had officially acquired the Chilean nationality and may be called up to the national team according to Ambassador of Chile to Norway, Waldemar Coutts. So, in November 2020, he received his first official call up to the Chile senior team for the 2022 World Cup qualifiers against Peru and Venezuela, making his international debut in the first match at the minute 83 by replacing Mauricio Isla.

== Personal life ==
His father, Miguel, is a Chilean who came to Norway in 1994 and his mother, Anne, is Norwegian. He has a sister, Lene, and a brother, Fabian. His paternal grandfather, Óscar Castro, was a football referee who first involved Niklas' uncles, and later Niklas himself, in football.

== Career statistics ==
=== Club ===
As of match played 15 October 2026

Appearances and goals by club, season and competition
Club	Season	League			Norwegian Cup		Continental		Total	
Club	Season	Division	Apps	Goals	Apps	Goals	Apps	Goals	Apps	Goals
Vålerenga	2016	Tippeligaen	9	0	4	1	–		13	1
Kongsvinger	2017	Norwegian First Division	25	12	3	3	–		28	15
Kongsvinger	2018	Norwegian First Division	28	10	2	2	–		30	12
Kongsvinger	Total		53	22	5	5	–		58	27
Aalesund	2019	Norwegian First Division	24	17	3	3	–		27	20
Aalesund	2020	Eliteserien	24	4	0	0	–		24	4
Aalesund	2021	Norwegian First Division	25	7	2	0	–		27	7
Aalesund	Total		73	28	5	3	–		78	31
Brann	2022	Norwegian First Division	29	11	2	2	–		31	13
Brann	2023	Eliteserien	20	7	4	1	4 (Note: Appearances in UEFA Conference League)	1	28	9
Brann	2024	Eliteserien	29	9	3	2	6	0	38	11
Brann	2025	Eliteserien	17	4	1	0	9 (Note: Appearances in UEFA Europa League)	1	27	5
Brann	2026	Eliteserien	9	2	1	1	6	6	16	9
Brann	Total		104	33	11	6	25	8	140	47
Career total			239	83	25	15	25	8	289	106

== Honours ==
Individual

- Eliteserien Player of the Month: October/November 2024
