= Aleksander van der Spa =

Norwegian footballer (born 2005)

Personal information
- Full name: Aleksander van der Spa
- Date of birth: 21 February 2005 (age 21)
- Height: 1.88 m (6 ft 2 in)
- Position: Centre-back

Team information
- Current team: Strømsgodset
- Number: 4

Youth career
- –2023: Bodø/Glimt

Senior career*
Years	Team	Apps	(Gls)
2022–2024	Bodø/Glimt	0	(0)
2023–2024	→ Junkeren (loan)	22	(4)
2024–2026	Sandefjord	5	(0)
2025	→ Moss (loan)	6	(0)
2026–	Strømsgodset	1	(0)
2026	→ Raufoss (loan)	2	(0)
- * Club domestic league appearances and goals as of 20 November 2026

Aleksander van der Spa (born 21 February 2005) is a Norwegian professional footballer who plays as a centre-back for Norwegian First Division club Strømsgodset.

== Club career ==
=== Bodø/Glimt ===
Van der Spa developed through the youth academy of Bodø/Glimt, where he trained regularly with the first team during his later academy years. He made his senior first-team debut in a Norwegian Football Cup match in May 2023, aged 18.

In the second half of 2023, he joined Junkeren on loan in the Norwegian Second Division. He remained with the club for the first half of the 2024 season, making 22 league appearances and scoring four goals across his two loan spells.

=== Sandefjord ===
In August 2024, van der Spa transferred to Eliteserien club Sandefjord. He made two league appearances during the remainder of the 2024 season and a further three in 2025.

In the second half of the 2025 season, he joined Moss on loan in the Norwegian First Division, making six league appearances. He subsequently returned to Sandefjord to compete for a place in the first team.

=== Strømsgodset ===
On 1 February 2026, van der Spa signed a four-year contract with Strømsgodset, following their relegation from Eliteserien.

Shortly after joining the club, he suffered a fracture in his foot during training, ruling him out for several months.

On 18 June 2026, he joined fellow First Division club Raufoss on loan until 5 July, making two league appearances. During the loan spell, he suffered another fracture in his foot and subsequently underwent surgery before returning to Strømsgodset.

== Career statistics ==
As of 20 November 2026

League appearances and goals are recorded by the Norwegian Football Federation.
