= Rasmus Holten =

Norwegian footballer (born 2005)

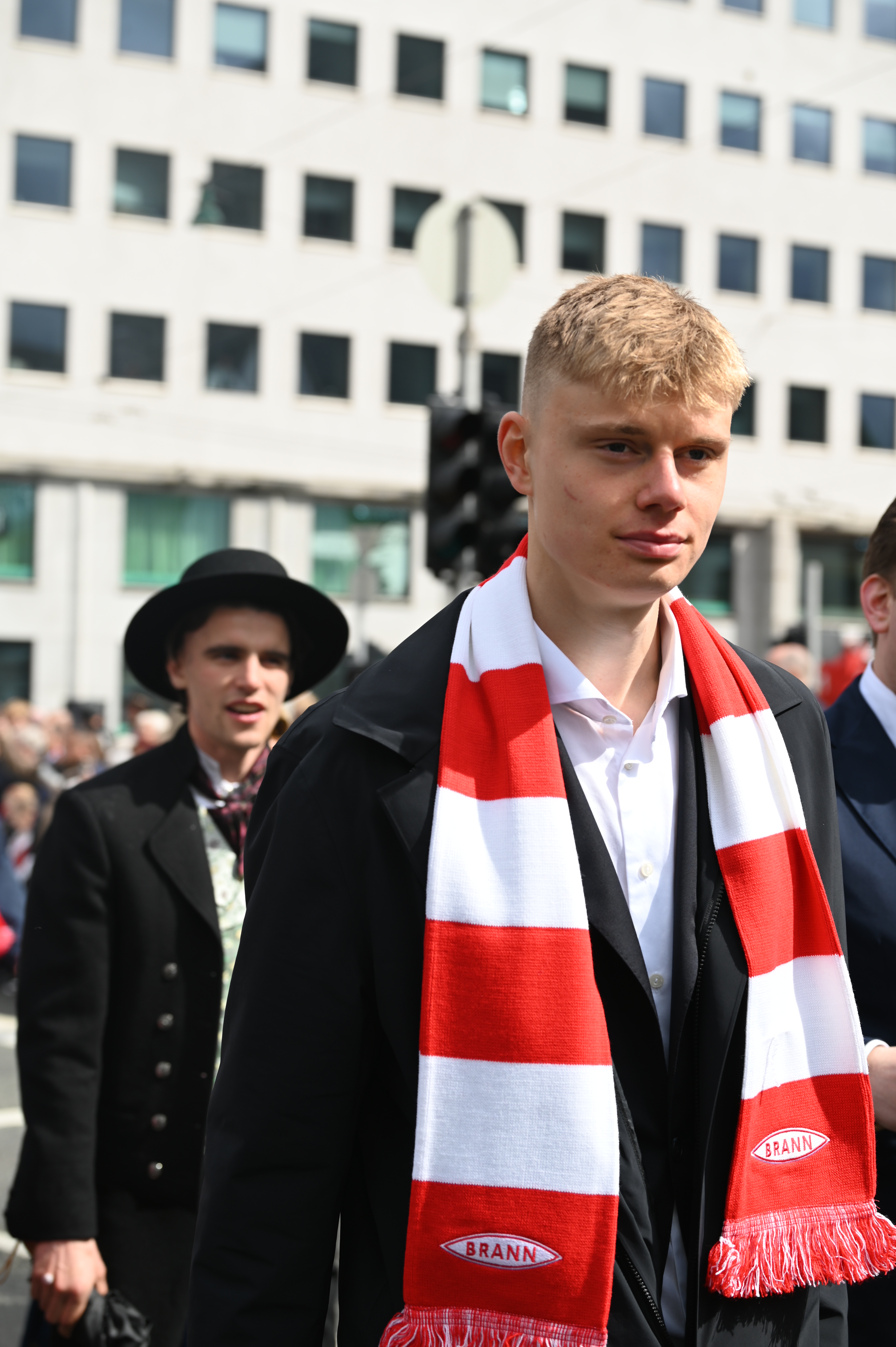

Personal information
- Date of birth: 20 February 2005 (age 21)
- Place of birth: Bergen, Norway
- Height: 1.95 m (6 ft 5 in)
- Position: Centre-back

Team information
- Current team: Sandefjord
- Number: 13

Youth career
- –2017: Smørås
- 2017–2021: Fana
- 2021–2022: Brann

Senior career*
Years	Team	Apps	(Gls)
2022–2026	Brann 2	44	(4)
2022–2026	Brann	20	(1)
2023–2024	→ Mjøndalen (loan)	28	(2)
2025	→ Sogndal (loan)	9	(0)
2026–	Sandefjord	12	(0)

International career^{‡}
2023	Norway U18	11	(0)
2023–2024	Norway U19	12	(1)
2025–	Norway U20	5	(2)
2024–	Norway U21	13	(1)
- * Club domestic league appearances and goals as of 14 November 2026 ‡ National team caps and goals as of 14 November 2026

Rasmus Holten (born 20 February 2005) is a Norwegian professional footballer who plays as a centre-back for Sandefjord.

== Club career ==
Born in Bergen, Holten is a youth product of Fana and Brann.

On 26 February 2022, he signed his first professional contract with Brann, before starting his professional career with the Eliteserien.

Holten made his professional debut with Brann in a 7–0 cup win over Voss on 18 May 2022.

After these early steps in the first team, he then went on loan at Mjøndalen in the Norwegian First Division for most of the 2023 and 2024 seasons.

Back with Brann, he went on to feature more often with the team as they finished second in the league, then playing the Champions league qualifying in the summer 2025.

== International career ==
He is a youth international for Norway, having played from the under-18 to the under-21.

He captained the Norway national under-20 football team in the 2025 FIFA U-20 World Cup, where Norway reached the knockout stages for the first time in history. Holten scored the only goal in the first match against Nigeria. After the game, FIFA officially named him the Player of the match. He also scored in the quarter finals against France.

== Career statistics ==
As of 14 November 2026

Appearances and goals by club, season and competition
Club	Season	League			National Cup		Europe		Total	
Club	Season	Division	Apps	Goals	Apps	Goals	Apps	Goals	Apps	Goals
Brann 2	2022	3. divisjon	23	1	—		—		23	1
Brann 2	2023	2. divisjon	11	3	—		—		11	3
Brann 2	2024	2. divisjon	3	0	—		—		3	0
Brann 2	2025	2. divisjon	7	0	—		—		7	0
Brann 2	Total		44	4	—		—		44	4
Brann	2022	1. divisjon	0	0	1	0	—		1	0
Brann	2023	Eliteserien	4	0	1	1	—		5	1
Brann	2024	Eliteserien	2	0	0	0	—		2	0
Brann	2025	Eliteserien	8	0	3	1	3 (Note: Appearances in UEFA Champions League)	0	14	1
Brann	2026	Eliteserien	6	1	1	0	0	0	7	1
Brann	Total		20	1	6	2	3	0	29	3
Mjøndalen (loan)	2023	1. divisjon	15	0	0	0	—		15	0
Mjøndalen (loan)	2024	1. divisjon	13	2	2	0	—		15	2
Mjøndalen (loan)	Total		28	2	2	0	—		30	2
Sogndal (loan)	2025	1. divisjon	9	0	0	0	—		9	0
Sandefjord	2026	Eliteserien	12	0	0	0	—		12	0
Career total			113	7	8	2	3	0	124	9
