= Eivind Helland =

Norwegian footballer (born 2005)

Personal information
- Full name: Eivind Fauske Helland
- Date of birth: 25 April 2005 (age 21)
- Place of birth: Bergen, Norway
- Height: 1.96 m (6 ft 5 in)
- Position: Centre-back

Team information
- Current team: Bologna
- Number: 5

Youth career
- –2018: Sædalen
- 2019–2021: Fyllingsdalen
- 2022–2023: Brann

Senior career*
Years	Team	Apps	(Gls)
2021	Fyllingsdalen 2	8	(1)
2021	Fyllingsdalen	5	(1)
2022–2024	Brann 2	47	(3)
2023–2026	Brann	45	(1)
2026–	Bologna	11	(0)

International career^{‡}
2023	Norway U18	8	(0)
2024	Norway U19	8	(0)
2024–	Norway U21	14	(1)
2025–	Norway	2	(0)
- * Club domestic league appearances and goals as of 28 October 2026 ‡ National team caps and goals as of 17 November 2026

Eivind Fauske Helland (born 25 April 2005) is a Norwegian football player who plays as a centre-back for Serie A club Bologna and the Norway national team.

== Club career ==
On 16 January 2026, Helland signed for Bologna in Italy.

== Personal life ==
Helland is the son of former Brann player and Norway international Roger Helland.

== Career statistics ==
=== Club ===
As of 28 October 2026

Appearances and goals by club, season and competition
Club	Season	League			Cup		Europe		Total	
Club	Season	Division	Apps	Goals	Apps	Goals	Apps	Goals	Apps	Goals
Fyllingsdalen 2	2021	4. divisjon	8	1	—		—		8	1
Fyllingsdalen	2021	3. divisjon	5	1	0	0	—		5	1
Brann 2	2022	3. divisjon	16	3	—		—		16	3
Brann 2	2023	2. divisjon	22	0	—		—		22	0
Brann 2	2024	2. divisjon	9	0	—		—		9	0
Brann 2	Total		47	3	—		—		47	3
Brann	2023	Eliteserien	3	0	1	0	—		4	0
Brann	2024	Eliteserien	14	1	2	0	1 (Note: Appearance in UEFA Conference League)	0	17	1
Brann	2025	Eliteserien	28	0	3	0	12 (Note: Two appearances in UEFA Champions League, ten appearances in UEFA Europa League)	0	43	0
Brann	Total		45	1	6	0	13	0	64	1
Bologna	2025–26	Serie A	5	0	1	0	0	0	6	0
Bologna	2026–27	Serie A	6	0	0	0	—		6	0
Bologna	Total		11	0	1	0	—		12	0
Career total			116	6	7	0	13	0	136	6

=== International ===
As of match played 17 November 2026

Appearances and goals by national team and year
National team	Year	Apps	Goals
Norway	2025	1	0
Norway	2026	1	0
Total		2	0
