= Julius Lindberg =

Adolf Julius Lindberg (2 August 1878 - 4 July 1953) was a Finnish Lutheran clergyman and politician. He was born in Borgå landskommun (Porvoon maalaiskunta), and was a member of the Parliament of Finland from 1913 to 1916 and from 1922 to 1924, representing the Swedish People's Party of Finland (SFP).
