= Robert Harvey =

Robert Harvey or Rob Harvey may refer to:

== Sports ==
- Robert Harvey (cricketer) (1911–2000), South African cricketer
- Robert Harvey (footballer) (born 1971), Australian rules football coach and former player

== Politicians ==
- Robert Harvey (Australian politician) (1897–1968), member of the Tasmanian Parliament
- Robert Harvey (Clwyd politician) (born 1953), British historian and Conservative politician, former MP for Clwyd South West (1983–1987)
- Sir Robert Harvey, 1st Baronet, of Crown Point (1817–1870), MP Thetford 1865–1868
- Sir Robert Harvey, 1st Baronet of Langley Park (1825–1887), MP Buckinghamshire 1863–1868, 1874–1885

== Others ==
- R. C. Harvey (Robert C. Harvey, 1937–2022), author, critic and cartoonist
- Rob Harvey (special effects artist) (born 1964), Academy Award-winning special effects artist
- Sir Robert Harvey (businessman) (1847–1930), British saltpetre producer in Bolivia, Peru and Chile
- Robert Harvey (literary theorist) (born 1951), literary scholar and academic
- Robert Harvey (musician) (born 1983), British musician
- Robert B. Harvey, co-founder of Harvey Comics

== See also ==
- Bobby Harvey (born 1955), Scottish footballer with Clyde
- Bob Harvey (disambiguation)
- Robert Harvie (disambiguation)
