= Joachim Soltvedt =

Norwegian footballer (born 1995)

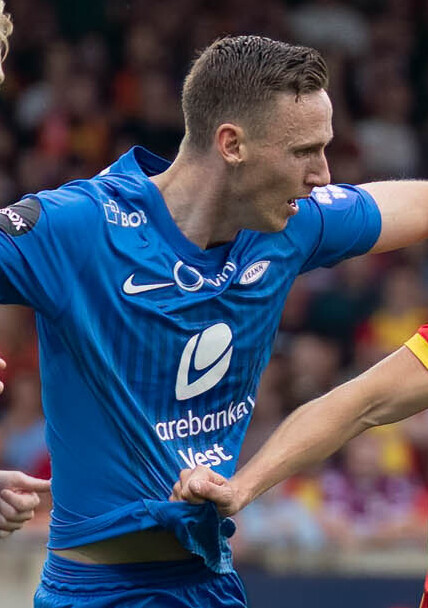

Personal information
- Full name: Joachim Soltvedt
- Date of birth: 9 September 1995 (age 31)
- Place of birth: Bergen, Norway
- Height: 1.87 m (6 ft 1 1/2 in)
- Position: Left-back

Team information
- Current team: Brann
- Number: 17

Youth career
- 2012–2014: Brann

Senior career*
| Years | Team | Apps | (Gls) |
| 2014 | Brann | 0 | (0) |
| 2015–2017 | Åsane | 72 | (15) |
| 2017–2019 | Sogndal | 54 | (10) |
| 2020–2023 | Sarpsborg 08 | 86 | (11) |
| 2023– | Brann | 74 | (12) |
- * Club domestic league appearances and goals as of 9 October 2026

Joachim Soltvedt (born 9 September 1995) is a Norwegian football player currently playing as a left-back for Brann.

== Career statistics ==
As of 15 October 2026

| Club | Season | Division | League | | Cup | | Europe | | Total | |
| Club | Season | Division | Apps | Goals | Apps | Goals | Apps | Goals | Apps | Goals |
|---|---|---|---|---|---|---|---|---|---|---|
| Brann | 2014 | Tippeligaen | 0 | 0 | 0 | 0 | — | | 0 | 0 |
| Åsane | 2015 | OBOS-ligaen | 28 | 7 | 3 | 1 | — | | 31 | 8 |
| Åsane | 2016 | OBOS-ligaen | 27 | 6 | 3 | 1 | — | | 30 | 7 |
| Åsane | 2017 | OBOS-ligaen | 17 | 2 | 2 | 1 | — | | 19 | 3 |
| Åsane | Total | | 72 | 15 | 8 | 3 | — | | 80 | 18 |
| Sogndal | 2017 | Eliteserien | 5 | 1 | 0 | 0 | — | | 5 | 1 |
| Sogndal | 2018 | OBOS-ligaen | 24 | 6 | 2 | 1 | — | | 26 | 7 |
| Sogndal | 2019 | OBOS-ligaen | 25 | 3 | 2 | 2 | — | | 27 | 5 |
| Sogndal | Total | | 54 | 10 | 4 | 3 | — | | 58 | 14 |
| Sarpsborg 08 | 2020 | Eliteserien | 24 | 3 | 0 | 0 | — | | 24 | 3 |
| Sarpsborg 08 | 2021 | Eliteserien | 16 | 0 | 2 | 0 | — | | 18 | 0 |
| Sarpsborg 08 | 2022 | Eliteserien | 28 | 4 | 1 | 0 | — | | 29 | 4 |
| Sarpsborg 08 | 2023 | Eliteserien | 18 | 4 | 5 | 1 | — | | 23 | 5 |
| Sarpsborg 08 | Total | | 86 | 11 | 8 | 1 | — | | 94 | 12 |
| Brann | 2023 | Eliteserien | 10 | 1 | 0 | 0 | — | | 10 | 1 |
| Brann | 2024 | Eliteserien | 19 | 5 | 2 | 1 | — | | 21 | 6 |
| Brann | 2025 | Eliteserien | 24 | 2 | 3 | 0 | 7 (Note: Two appearances in UEFA Champions League, five appearances in UEFA Europa League) | 0 | 35 | 2 |
| Brann | 2026 | Eliteserien | 21 | 4 | 4 | 1 | 11 (Note: Four appearances in UEFA Europa League, seven appearances in UEFA Conference League) | 1 | 37 | 6 |
| Brann | Total | | 74 | 12 | 9 | 2 | 18 | 1 | 101 | 17 |
| Career Total | | | 286 | 49 | 29 | 9 | 18 | 1 | 333 | 59 |
