= 2026 SK Brann season =

Brann
2026 season
- Chairman: Arild Mjøs Andersen
- Head coach: Freyr Alexandersson (until 1 June)
- Stadium: Brann Stadion
- Eliteserien: 11th
- 2025–26 Norwegian Cup: Runners-up
- 2026–27 Norwegian Cup: Pre-season
- 2025–26 Europa League: Knockout phase play-offs
- 2026–27 Conference League: Second qualifying round
Home colours	Away colours

The 2026 season is the 118th season in the history of Sportsklubben Brann and the fourth consecutive season in the Eliteserien. In addition, Brann will participate in the 2026–27 Norwegian Football Cup and the 2026–27 UEFA Conference League. The team completed its participation in the 2025–26 Norwegian Football Cup as runners-up.

== Transfers ==
=== In ===
Pos.	Player	Transferred from	Fee	Date	Source
DF	(Norway) Martin Hellan	(Norway) Stabæk	Loan return	31 December 2025	
MF	(Iceland) Kristall Máni Ingason	(Denmark) Sønderjyske	€1,400,000	26 January 2026	
FW	(Iceland) Jón Dagur Þorsteinsson	(Germany) Hertha BSC	Loan	2 February 2026	
GK	(Norway) Simen Vidtun Nilsen	(Norway) Ranheim		4 February 2026	
MF	(Norway) Kristian Eriksen	(Norway) Molde	~NOK 7.5 million	30 March 2026	
DF	(Senegal) Cheikh Mbacké Diop	(Croatia) Lokomotiva Zagreb	~NOK 30 million	30 March 2026	
FW	(Wales) Rabbi Matondo	(Scotland) Rangers	Undisclosed	3 April 2026	
GK	(Netherlands) Tom Bramel	(Netherlands) RKC Waalwijk	Loan return	30 June 2026	

=== Out ===
Pos.	Player	Transferred to	Fee	Date	Source
GK	(Netherlands) Tom Bramel	(Netherlands) RKC Waalwijk	Loan	8 January 2026	
DF	(Denmark) Japhet Sery Larsen	(United States) Philadelphia Union	~NOK 15 million	13 January 2026	
DF	(Norway) Eivind Helland	(Italy) Bologna	~€8.5 million	16 January 2026	
MF	(Denmark) Emil Kornvig	(Poland) Widzew Łódź	€3,500,000	23 January 2026	
FW	(Denmark) Mads Hansen	(Sweden) IF Brommapojkarna	Undisclosed	8 February 2026	
MF	(Norway) Lars Remmem	(Norway) Haugesund	Loan	18 March 2026	
FW	(Norway) Mads Sande	(Norway) Kongsvinger	Undisclosed	25 March 2026	
FW	(Iceland) Jón Dagur Þorsteinsson	(Germany) Hertha BSC	Loan return	30 June 2026	

== Pre-season and friendlies ==
20 February 2026 Friendly	Brann (Norway)	2–2	(Norway) Sotra

26 June 2026 Friendly	Aarhus Fremad (Denmark)	1–2	(Norway) Brann	Aarhus, Denmark
15:00	50'		25', 77'	Stadium: Riisvangen Stadium

3 July 2026 Friendly	Brann (Norway)	1–2	(Norway) Kristiansund	Bergen
15:00	68'		39'; 80'	Stadium: Nymarksbanene

== Competitions ==
=== Overall record ===
Competition	First match	Last match	Starting round	Final position	Record							
Competition	First match	Last match	Starting round	Final position	Pld	W	D	L	GF	GA	GD	Win %
Eliteserien	15 March 2026		Matchday 1		12	4	1	7	24	20	+4	33.33
2025–26 Norwegian Football Cup	8 March 2026	9 May 2026	Fourth round	Runners-up	4	3	1	0	10	7	+3	75.00
2026–27 Norwegian Football Cup					0	0	0	0	0	0	+0	—
2025–26 UEFA Europa League	19 February 2026	26 February 2026	Knockout phase play-offs	Knockout phase play-offs	2	0	0	2	0	2	−2	0.00
2026–27 UEFA Conference League	23 July 2026		Second qualifying round		0	0	0	0	0	0	+0	—
Total					18	7	2	9	34	29	+5	38.89

Last updated: 29 May 2026
Source: Competitions

=== Eliteserien ===
Pos	Team	Pld	W	D	L	GF	GA	GD	Pts	Qualification or relegation
4	Molde	17	8	3	6	32	26	+6	27	Qualification for the Conference League second qualifying round
5	Lillestrøm	17	8	2	7	23	21	+2	26	
6	Brann	17	8	1	8	36	27	+9	25	
7	Rosenborg	17	7	3	7	25	22	+3	24	
8	Fredrikstad	17	7	2	8	18	27	−9	23	

Updated to match(es) played on 16 August 2026. Source: Football Association of Norway (in Norwegian)
Rules for classification: 1) Points; 2) Goal difference; 3) Goals scored; 4) Head-to-head points; 5) Head-to-head goal difference; 6) Head-to-head goals scored.

==== Results summary ====
Overall								Home						Away					
Pld	W	D	L	GF	GA	GD	Pts	W	D	L	GF	GA	GD	W	D	L	GF	GA	GD
12	4	1	7	24	20	+4	13	2	0	3	7	7	0	2	1	4	17	13	+4

Last updated: 29 May 2026.

==== Results by round ====
Round	1	2	3	4	5	6	7	8	9	10	11	12	13	14	15	16	17
Ground	A	H	A	H	A	A	H	A	H	A	H	A	H	A	H	H	A
Result	L	L	W	L	L	D	W	L	W	L	L						W
Position																	

Updated to match(es) played on 29 May 2026. Source:
A = Away; H = Home; W = Win; D = Draw; L = Loss

==== Matches ====
The match schedule was issued on 19 December 2025.

15 March 2026 1	Kristiansund	3–2	Brann

22 March 2026 2	Brann	1–2	Tromsø

6 April 2026 3	HamKam	1–5	Brann

12 April 2026 4	Brann	0–1	Sandefjord

18 April 2026 5	Viking	3–2	Brann

25 April 2026 6	Rosenborg	1–1	Brann

29 April 2026 17	Tromsø	0–5	Brann

2 May 2026 7	Brann	3–1	Fredrikstad

16 May 2026 9	Brann	2–1	KFUM Oslo

20 May 2026 8	Aalesund	2–1	Brann

24 May 2026 10	Bodø/Glimt	3–1	Brann

29 May 2026 11	Brann	1–2	Sarpsborg 08	Bergen
19:00				Stadium: Brann Stadion

=== Norwegian Football Cup ===
==== 2025–26 ====
8 March 2026 Fourth round	Tromsdalen	2–3 (a.e.t.)	Brann

19 March 2026 Quarter-finals	Bryne	1–2	Brann

22 April 2026 Semi-finals	Brann	2–1	Aalesund

9 May 2026 Final	Bodø/Glimt	3–3 (a.e.t.) (4–2 p)	Brann

==== 2026–27 ====
22–23 August 2026 First round	Fyllingen	v	Brann

=== 2025–26 UEFA Europa League ===
19 February 2026 First leg	Brann (Norway)	0–1	(Italy) Bologna	Bergen
18:45	Kwame Boakye (yellow card) 30'		Castro 9'; Bernardeschi (yellow card) 14'	Stadium: Brann Stadion; Attendance: 15,680; Referee: Rade Obrenović (Slovenia)

26 February 2026 Second leg	Bologna (Italy)	1–0 (2–0 agg.)	(Norway) Brann	Bologna, Italy
21:00	Vitík (yellow card) 28'; Bernardeschi (yellow card) 41'; João Mário 56'; Orsolini (yellow card) 80'		Sørensen (red card) 37'; Holten (yellow card) 78'	Stadium: Stadio Renato Dall'Ara; Attendance: 19,710; Referee: Benoît Bastien (France)

=== 2026–27 UEFA Conference League ===
==== Second qualifying round ====
23 July 2026 First leg	Universitatea Cluj (Romania)	2–2	(Norway) Brann	Sfântu Gheorghe, Romania
19:00 EEST (UTC+3)	Ștefănescu (yellow card) 46'; Adams (yellow card) 75'; Lukić 85'; Pedro Pinho 87'; Chipciu (yellow card) 87'	Report	Castro 40'; Myhre 53'; Pallesen (yellow card) 86'; Soltvedt (yellow card) 87'	Stadium: Sepsi Arena Stadium; Attendance: 2,821; Referee: Henrik Nalbandyan (Armenia)

30 July 2026 Second leg	Brann (Norway)	3–1	(Romania) Universitatea Cluj	Bergen, Norway
19:00 EEST (UTC+3)	Castro 8', 75' (yellow card) 32'; Mathisen 45'	Report	Mikanović (yellow card) 14'; Lukić 26'; Ștefănescu (yellow card) 45'; Codrea (yellow card) 76'; Chipciu (yellow card) 90+2'	Stadium: Brann Stadion; Attendance: 12,308; Referee: Mateo Erceg (Croatia)

==== Third qualifying round ====
5 August 2026 First leg	Brann (Norway)	0–1	(Cyprus) Apollon Limassol	Bergen, Norway
19:00 EEST (UTC+3)	Castro (yellow card) 47'; Eriksen (yellow card) 90+2'	Report	Ožbolt 22' (yellow card) 45'; Kühn (yellow card) 78'	Stadium: Brann Stadion; Attendance: 12,750; Referee: Damian Kos (Poland)

11 August 2026 Second leg	Apollon Limassol (Cyprus)	2–4	(Norway) Brann	Limassol, Cyprus
19:00 EEST (UTC+3)	Ožbolt (yellow card) 43'; Konomis (yellow card) 74'; Ljubić 86'; Weissbeck 92'	Report	Ingason 16' (yellow card) 58' (yellow-red card) 118'; Pallesen (yellow card) 30'; Castro (yellow card) 32'; Horneland (yellow card) 85'; Holm 90+6', 95'; Eriksen 105'	Stadium: Alphamega Stadium; Attendance: 7,253; Referee: Rob Harvey (Republic of Ireland)

==== Play-offs round ====
20 August 2026 First leg	PAOK (Greece)	1–1	(Norway) Brann	Thessaloniki, Greece
19:45 EEST (UTC+3)	Zafeiris (yellow card) 63'; Rahman 80'; Chatzidiakos (yellow card) 90+3'	Report	Knudsen (yellow card) 38'; Eriksen 57'; Finne (yellow card) 58'; Soltvedt (yellow card) 62'	Stadium: Toumba Stadium; Attendance: 14,667; Referee: António Nobre (Portugal)

27 August 2026 Second leg	Brann (Norway)	3–2 (4–3 agg.)	(Greece) PAOK	Bergen, Norway
19:00 EEST (UTC+3)	Holm 45+3'; Ingason 56'; Castro (yellow card) 59', (goal) 86' (pen.); Mathisen (yellow card) 90+4'	Report	Louchet (yellow card) 37'; Michailidis (yellow card) 53'; Zafeiris (yellow card) 57', (goal) 67'; Ndiaye 63'; Giannoulis (yellow card) 83'; Pelkas (yellow card) 90+4'; Tsiftsis (yellow card) 90+6'	Stadium: Brann Stadion; Referee: John Brooks (England)
