= Martin Hellan =

Norwegian footballer (born 2003)

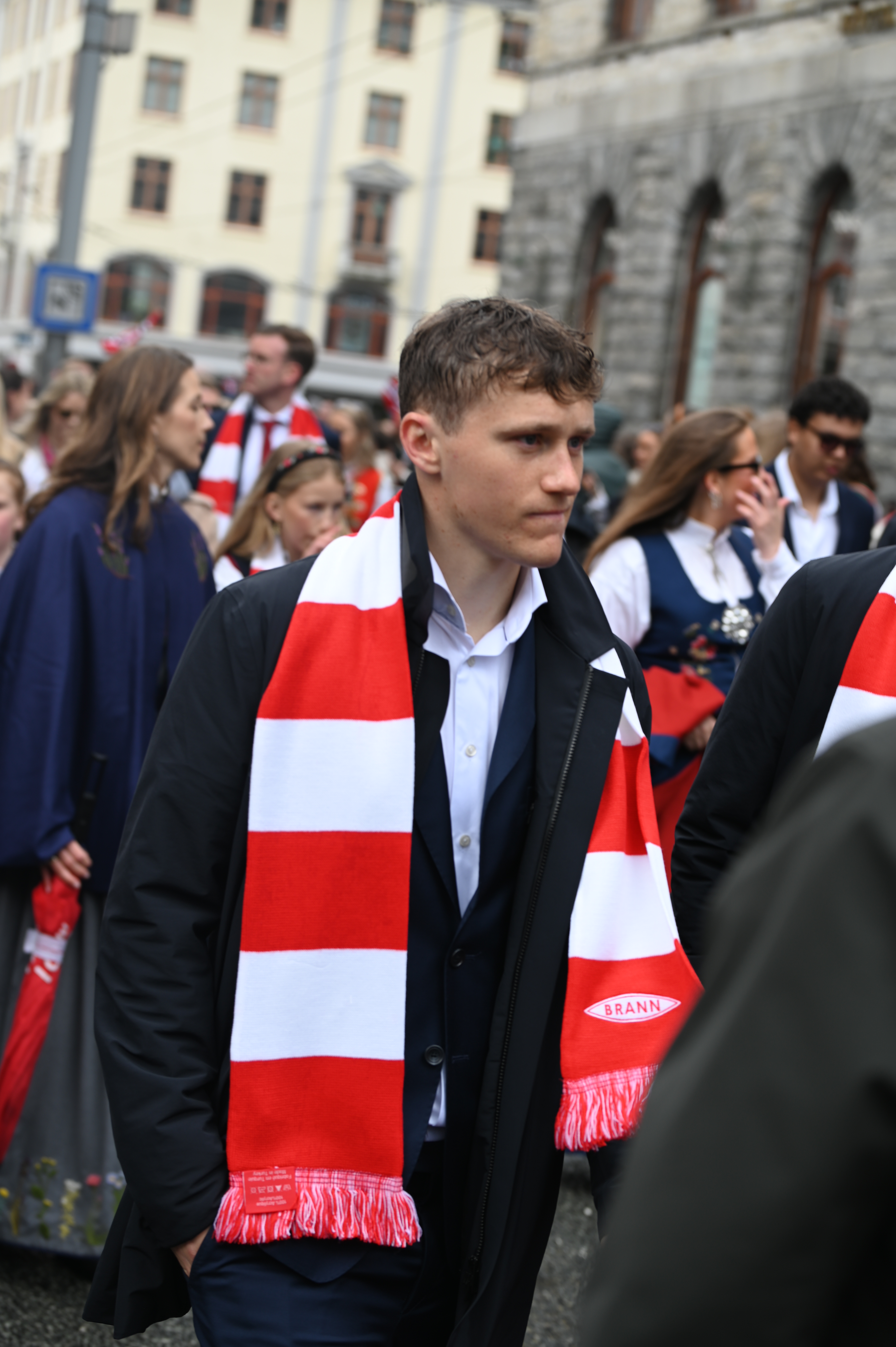

Personal information
- Date of birth: 17 August 2003 (age 23)
- Height: 1.75 m (5 ft 9 in)
- Position: Right-back

Team information
- Current team: Sandefjord on loan from Brann
- Number: 2

Youth career
- –2018: Jutul
- –2018: Fornebu
- 2018–2022: Stabæk

Senior career*
Years	Team	Apps	(Gls)
2023	Kongsvinger	27	(2)
2024–	Brann	3	(0)
2025	→ Stabæk (loan)	16	(0)
2026–	→ Sandefjord (loan)	2	(0)

International career
2023	Norway U20	3	(0)
- * Club domestic league appearances and goals as of 27 August 2026

Martin Hellan (born 17 August 2003) is a Norwegian footballer who plays as a right-back for Sandefjord on loan from SK Brann.

== Career ==
Hailing from Skui, he played children's football for IL Jutul and Fornebu FK before joining Stabæk in 2018.

Not awarded a contract with Stabæk when he reached the age of a senior player, he went to First Division club Kongsvinger in 2023. After only one season in Kongsvinger, Hellan was reportedly sought after by several Eliteserien clubs. The club he signed for was SK Brann.

However, Hellan would go several months without making his Eliteserien debut. His first Brann match came against Go Ahead Eagles in the 2024–25 UEFA Conference League qualifying. It was later revealed that he broke a bone around the 10th minute and was not substituted out before the 75th minute. Hellan returned from injury and played a friendly match in March 2025, but on the same day, Brann signed Denzel De Roeve. Hellan joined his teenage club Stabæk on loan in 2025, with two right-backs on that team being injured.

In 2026 Hellan was back in Brann. He was omitted from a squad during continental play, but finally made his Eliteserien debut in May 2026 against Aalesund. Following a rare start for Brann in July 2026, Hellan chose to go on loan to Sandefjord to play more regularly.
