= 2014 SK Brann season =

Brann
2014 season
- Chairman: Rolf Barmen
- Head Coach: Rikard Norling
- Stadium: Brann Stadion
- Tippeligaen: 14th Relegation play-offs
- Norwegian Cup: Quarter-finals vs Odd
- Top goalscorer: League: Jakob Orlov (9); All: Jakob Orlov (10)
- Highest home attendance: 17,686 vs Sogndal (2 November 2014)
- Lowest home attendance: 2,656 vs Ranheim (27 June 2014)
- Average home league attendance: 11,414
| Home colours | Away colours |

The 2014 season is Brann's 28th season in the Tippeligaen since their promotion in 1987, and their first season with Rikard Norling as manager. Brann will compete in the Tippeligaen and the Norwegian Cup.

== Squad ==
Note: Flags indicate national team as defined under FIFA eligibility rules; some limited exceptions apply. Players may hold more than one non-FIFA nationality.

| No. | Pos. | Nation | Player |
|---|---|---|---|
| 1 | GK | NOR | Ådne Nissestad |
| 2 | DF | ISL | Birkir Sævarsson |
| 3 | DF | NOR | Erlend Hanstveit (captain) |
| 4 | MF | NOR | Eirik Birkelund |
| 5 | DF | MKD | Daniel Mojsov |
| 6 | DF | NOR | Vadim Demidov |
| 7 | MF | NOR | Hassan El Fakiri |
| 8 | MF | NOR | Fredrik Haugen |
| 9 | FW | NOR | Azar Karadas |
| 10 | FW | SWE | Jakob Orlov |
| 12 | GK | NOR | Øystein Øvretveit |
| 15 | FW | SEN | Ibrahima Dramé |

| No. | Pos. | Nation | Player |
|---|---|---|---|
| 17 | MF | SEN | Stéphane Badji |
| 18 | DF | SWE | Markus Jonsson |
| 19 | FW | NOR | Marcus Pedersen |
| 20 | FW | NOR | Håkon Lorentzen |
| 21 | DF | NOR | Andreas Vindheim |
| 22 | MF | NOR | Amin Askar |
| 23 | FW | NOR | Erik Huseklepp (vice-captain) |
| 24 | GK | POL | Piotr Leciejewski |
| 26 | MF | NOR | Kasper Skaanes |
| 27 | DF | SWE | Erdin Demir |
| 29 | MF | NOR | Kristoffer Barmen |
| 30 | DF | NOR | Jonas Grønner |

=== On Loan ===
Note: Flags indicate national team as defined under FIFA eligibility rules; some limited exceptions apply. Players may hold more than one non-FIFA nationality.

| No. | Pos. | Nation | Player |
|---|---|---|---|
| 19 | MF | NOR | Kristoffer Larsen (at Hønefoss) |

== Transfers ==
=== Winter ===
In: Note: Flags indicate national team as defined under FIFA eligibility rules; some limited exceptions apply. Players may hold more than one non-FIFA nationality.

| No. | Pos. | Nation | Player |
|---|---|---|---|
| 3 | DF | NOR | Erlend Hanstveit (from (Sweden) Helsingborg) |
| 6 | DF | NOR | Vadim Demidov (from (Russia) Anzhi Makhachkala) |
| 10 | FW | SWE | Jakob Orlov (from (Sweden) Gefle) |
| 15 | FW | SEN | Ibrahima Dramé (from (Senegal) Casa Sports) |
| 30 | DF | NOR | Jonas Grønner (loan return from (Iceland) KR) |

Out: Note: Flags indicate national team as defined under FIFA eligibility rules; some limited exceptions apply. Players may hold more than one non-FIFA nationality.

| No. | Pos. | Nation | Player |
|---|---|---|---|
| 1 | GK | NOR | Jørgen Mohus (to (Norway) Bærum) |
| 4 | DF | NOR | Simen Wangberg (to (Norway) Tromsø) |
| 9 | FW | AUT | Martin Pušić (to (Denmark) Esbjerg) |
| 25 | DF | NOR | Henrik Gjesdal (loan to (Norway) Nest-Sotra) |
| 28 | FW | NOR | Bård Finne (to (Germany) Köln) |
| 32 | DF | NOR | Tomasz Sokolowski (loan to (Norway) Stabæk) |
| 33 | DF | NOR | Kjetil Kalve (to (Norway) Nest-Sotra) |
| — | FW | GHA | Kennedy Ashia (loan return to (Ghana) Liberty Professionals) |

=== Summer ===
In: Note: Flags indicate national team as defined under FIFA eligibility rules; some limited exceptions apply. Players may hold more than one non-FIFA nationality.

| No. | Pos. | Nation | Player |
|---|---|---|---|
| 4 | MF | NOR | Eirik Birkelund (from (France) Saint-Étienne) |
| 9 | FW | NOR | Azar Karadas (from (Norway) Sogndal) |
| 19 | FW | NOR | Marcus Pedersen (from (Netherlands) Vitesse Arnhem) |

Out: Note: Flags indicate national team as defined under FIFA eligibility rules; some limited exceptions apply. Players may hold more than one non-FIFA nationality.

| No. | Pos. | Nation | Player |
|---|---|---|---|
| 19 | MF | NOR | Kristoffer Larsen (on loan to (Norway) Hønefoss) |
| 32 | MF | NOR | Tomasz Sokolowski (to (Norway) Stabæk) |
| — | DF | NOR | Henrik Gjesdal (to (Norway) Tromsø, previously on loan to Nest-Sotra) |

== Competitions ==
=== Tippeligaen ===
==== Results summary ====
| Overall | | | | | | | | Home | | | | | | Away | | | | | |
| Pld | W | D | L | GF | GA | GD | Pts | W | D | L | GF | GA | GD | W | D | L | GF | GA | GD |
|---|---|---|---|---|---|---|---|---|---|---|---|---|---|---|---|---|---|---|---|
| 30 | 8 | 5 | 17 | 41 | 54 | −13 | 29 | 4 | 1 | 10 | 16 | 21 | −5 | 4 | 4 | 7 | 25 | 33 | −8 |

==== Results by round ====
| Round | 1 | 2 | 3 | 4 | 5 | 6 | 7 | 8 | 9 | 10 | 11 | 12 | 13 | 14 | 15 | 16 | 17 | 18 | 19 | 20 | 21 | 22 | 23 | 24 | 25 | 26 | 27 | 28 | 29 | 30 |
|---|---|---|---|---|---|---|---|---|---|---|---|---|---|---|---|---|---|---|---|---|---|---|---|---|---|---|---|---|---|---|
| Ground | A | H | A | H | A | H | A | A | H | A | H | A | H | A | H | A | H | A | H | H | A | H | A | H | A | H | H | A | H | A |
| Result | L | L | D | W | L | L | D | W | L | L | L | L | L | W | L | D | L | L | W | W | D | L | W | D | L | L | L | L | W | W |
| Position | 15 | 16 | 15 | 12 | 13 | 15 | 15 | 12 | 13 | 13 | 14 | 15 | 16 | 14 | 15 | 15 | 15 | 15 | 15 | 15 | 15 | 15 | 13 | 14 | 15 | 15 | 15 | 15 | 14 | 14 |

Updated to match(es) played on 9 November 2014. Source: see below
A = Away; H = Home; W = Win; D = Draw; L = Loss

==== Results ====
| 30 March 2014 1 | Sarpsborg 08 | 3–0 | Brann | Sarpsborg |
| 19:00 CEST (UTC+2) | Zajić 20'; Olanare 37', 54' (pen.) | Summary | | Stadium: Sarpsborg Stadion; Attendance: 4,722; Referee: Dag Vidar Hafsås |

| 6 April 2014 2 | Brann | 1–2 | Stabæk | Bergen |
| 19:00 CEST (UTC+2) | Orlov 9' | Summary | Boli 5', 55' | Stadium: Brann Stadion; Attendance: 11,241; Referee: Kristoffer Helgerud |

| 11 April 2014 3 | Sandnes Ulf | 1–1 | Brann | Sandnes |
| 19:00 CEST (UTC+2) | Rubio 9' | Summary | Larsen 81' | Stadium: Sandnes Idrettspark; Attendance: 3,292; Referee: Svein Edvartsen |

| 21 April 2014 4 | Brann | 2–0 | Lillestrøm | Bergen |
| 18:00 CEST (UTC+2) | Orlov 53', 69' | Summary | | Stadium: Brann Stadion; Attendance: 9,641; Referee: Svein Oddvar Moen |

| 27 April 2014 5 | Rosenborg | 5–2 | Brann | Trondheim |
| 18:00 CEST (UTC+2) | Reginiussen 19'; Svensson 28'; Jensen 64'; Søderlund 76' (pen.); Nielsen 89' (pen.) | Summary | Skaanes 14', 60'; Badji (red card) 90+3' | Stadium: Lerkendal Stadion; Attendance: 14,378; Referee: Svein Edvartsen |

| 30 April 2014 6 | Brann | 1–3 | Haugesund | Bergen |
| 19:00 CEST (UTC+2) | Orlov 27' | Summary | Gytkjær 40' (pen.), 42', 50' | Stadium: Brann Stadion; Attendance: 10,012; Referee: Omar Rafiq |

| 4 May 2014 7 | IK Start | 1–1 | Brann | Kristiansand |
| 19:00 CEST (UTC+2) | Hoff 33' | Summary | Berger 80' (o.g.) | Stadium: Sør Arena; Attendance: 6,504; Referee: Per Staberg |

| 10 May 2014 8 | Aalesund | 0–1 | Brann | Ålesund |
| 18:00 CEST (UTC+2) | | Summary | A.Vindheim 37' | Stadium: Color Line Stadion; Attendance: 7,198; Referee: Brage Sandmoen |

| 16 May 2014 9 | Brann | 1–2 | Bodø/Glimt | Bergen |
| 18:00 CEST (UTC+2) | Lorentzen 87' | Summary | Olsen 35'; Ndiaye 61' | Stadium: Brann Stadion; Attendance: 17,032; Referee: Svein Oddvar Moen |

| 20 May 2014 10 | Sogndal | 2–1 | Brann | Sogndalsfjøra |
| 19:00 CEST (UTC+2) | Otoo 6'; Strand 44' | Summary | Orlov 49' | Stadium: Fosshaugane Campus; Attendance: 4,035; Referee: Trygve Kjensli |

| 25 May 2014 11 | Brann | 2–3 | Vålerenga | Bergen |
| 19:00 CEST (UTC+2) | Grønner 32'; Lorentzen 78' | Summary | Høgh 35'; Kjartansson 47'; Stengel 73' | Stadium: Brann Stadion; Attendance: 9,180; Referee: Per Ivar Staberg |

| 9 June 2014 12 | Molde | 4–2 | Brann | Molde |
| 18:00 CEST (UTC+2) | Elyounoussi 14', 45', 68' (pen.); Gulbrandsen 79' | Summary | Askar 20', 26' | Stadium: Aker Stadion; Attendance: 9,837; Referee: Tom Harald Hagen |

| 12 June 2014 13 | Brann | 0–1 | Odd | Bergen |
| 18:00 CEST (UTC+2) | | Summary | Hurme 29' | Stadium: Brann Stadion; Attendance: 8,510; Referee: Omar Rafiq |

| 6 July 2014 14 | Viking | 0–2 | Brann | Stavanger |
| 18:00 CEST (UTC+2) | | Summary | Grønner 17'; Orlov 35' | Stadium: Viking Stadion; Attendance: 9,931; Referee: Per Ivar Staberg |

| 12 July 2014 15 | Brann | 0–1 | Strømsgodset | Bergen |
| 19:00 CEST (UTC+2) | | Summary | Kovács 46' | Stadium: Brann Stadion; Attendance: 9,610; Referee: Brage Sandmoen |

| 19 July 2014 16 | Stabæk | 1–1 | Brann | Bærum |
| 19:00 CEST (UTC+2) | Høiland 90' | Summary | Skaanes 90+1' | Stadium: Nadderud Stadion; Attendance: 3,471; Referee: Martin Lundby |

| 27 July 2014 17 | Brann | 0–1 | Viking | Bergen |
| 20:00 CEST (UTC+2) | | Summary | Sverrisson 35' | Stadium: Brann Stadion; Attendance: 8,792; Referee: Omar Rafiq |

| 1 August 2014 18 | Lillestrøm | 4–3 | Brann | Lillestrøm |
| 19:00 CEST (UTC+2) | Moen 35' (pen.), 90+3'; Lundemo 41'; Friday 90+1' | Summary | Pálmason 45+1' (o.g.); Barmen 70'; Orlov 72'; Mojsov (yellow card) 40' (yellow-red card) 81' | Stadium: Åråsen Stadion; Attendance: 5,497; Referee: Dag Vidar Hafsås |

| 8 August 2014 19 | Brann | 1–0 | Aalesund | Bergen |
| 19:00 CEST (UTC+2) | | Summary | Orlov 83' | Stadium: Brann Stadion; Attendance: 13,574; Referee: Svein Oddvar Moen |

| 17 August 2014 20 | Brann | 3–1 | Rosenborg | Bergen |
| 18:00 CEST (UTC+2) | Mojsov 26'; Skaanes 29'; Pedersen 61' | Summary | Søderlund 60' | Stadium: Brann Stadion; Attendance: 14,573; Referee: Espen Berntsen |

| 23 August 2014 21 | Vålerenga | 3–3 | Brann | Oslo |
| 18:00 CEST (UTC+2) | Zahid 10'; Kjartansson 26', 67' | Summary | Haugen 29'; Hanstveit 79'; Sævarsson 87' | Stadium: Ullevaal Stadion; Attendance: 9,859; Referee: Svein Oddvar Moen |

| 31 August 2014 22 | Brann | 0–1 | Molde | Bergen |
| 19:00 CEST (UTC+2) | | Summary | Forren 32' | Stadium: Brann Stadion; Attendance: 15,240; Referee: Tom Harald Hagen |

| 13 September 2014 23 | Strømsgodset | 1–4 | Brann | Drammen |
| 18:00 CEST (UTC+2) | Kastrati 66' | Summary | Pedersen 18'; Skaanes 25'; Askar 48'; Huseklepp 67' | Stadium: Marienlyst Stadion; Attendance: 7,720; Referee: Svein Oddvar Moen |

| 19 September 2014 24 | Brann | 1–1 | Sandnes Ulf | Bergen |
| 19:00 CEST (UTC+2) | Askar 63' | Summary | Sigurbjörnsson 52' | Stadium: Brann Stadion; Attendance: 13,140; Referee: Trygve Kjensli |

| 28 September 2014 25 | Odd | 4–0 | Brann | Skien |
| 18:00 CEST (UTC+2) | Karadas 31' (o.g.); Johnsen 66'; Shala 70' (pen.); Mojsov 89' (o.g.) | Summary | | Stadium: Skagerak Arena; Attendance: 7,008; Referee: Espen Berntsen |

| 5 October 2014 26 | Brann | 1–2 | Start | Bergen |
| 20:00 CEST (UTC+2) | Pedersen 81' | Summary | Vilhjálmsson 18'; Karadas 62' (o.g.) | Stadium: Brann Stadion; Attendance: 11,347; Referee: Svein Oddvar Moen |

| 17 October 2014 27 | Brann | 1–2 | Sarpsborg 08 | Bergen |
| 19:00 CEST (UTC+2) | Haugen 26' | Summary | Nordvik 72'; Þórarinsson 82' | Stadium: Brann Stadion; Attendance: 10,204; Referee: Dag Vidar Hafsås |

| 26 October 2014 28 | Bodø/Glimt | 2–1 | Brann | Bodø |
| 20:00 CEST (UTC+2) | Moe (yellow card) 24'; Laajab 32' 42' (pen.); Jacobsen (yellow card) 85' | Summary | Askar (yellow card) 9'; Mojsov 64'; Pedersen (yellow card) 90+3' | Stadium: Aspmyra Stadion; Attendance: 4,038; Referee: Edvartsen |

| 2 November 2014 29 | Brann | 2–1 | Sogndal | Bergen |
| 18:00 CEST (UTC+2) | Grønner 45'; Karadas 46'; Pedersen (yellow card) 80'; Sævarsson (yellow card) 86' | Summary | Flo 55'; Patronen (yellow card) 81'; Nilsen (yellow card) 88' | Stadium: Brann Stadion; Attendance: 17,686; Referee: Ken Henry Johnsen |

| 9 November 2014 30 | Haugesund | 2–3 | Brann | Haugesund |
| 18:00 CEST (UTC+2) | Gytkjær 36'; Haraldseid 79'; Mæland (yellow card) 80'; Myrestam (yellow card) 90+4' | Summary | Huseklepp 6'; Orlov 12'; Skaanes (yellow card) 41'; Badji (yellow card) 47'; A.Vindheim (yellow card) 78' (goal) 90+11' | Stadium: Haugesund Stadion; Attendance: 8,945; Referee: Tom Harald Hagen |

==== Table ====
| Pos | Team | Pld | W | D | L | GF | GA | GD | Pts | Qualification or relegation |
|---|---|---|---|---|---|---|---|---|---|---|
| 12 | Start | 30 | 10 | 5 | 15 | 47 | 60 | −13 | 35 | |
| 13 | Bodø/Glimt | 30 | 10 | 5 | 15 | 45 | 60 | −15 | 35 | |
| 14 | Brann (R) | 30 | 8 | 5 | 17 | 41 | 54 | −13 | 29 | Qualification for the relegation play-offs |
| 15 | Sogndal (R) | 30 | 6 | 6 | 18 | 31 | 49 | −18 | 24 | Relegation to First Division |
| 16 | Sandnes Ulf (R) | 30 | 4 | 10 | 16 | 27 | 53 | −26 | 22 | Relegation to First Division |

Source: fotball.no
Rules for classification: 1) points; 2) goal difference; 3) number of goals scored.
(R) Relegated

==== Relegation play-offs ====
| 23 November 2014 1st leg | Brann | 1–1 | Mjøndalen | Bergen |
| 19:00 CET (UTC+1) | Skaanes 53' | Summary | Diomande 37' | Stadium: Brann Stadion; Attendance: 14,225; Referee: Brage Sandmoen |

| 26 November 2014 2nd leg | Mjøndalen | 3–0 (4–1 agg.) | Brann | Mjøndalen |
| 19:00 CET (UTC+1) | Kapidzic 27', 67'; Diomande 64' | Summary | | Stadium: Mjøndalen Stadion; Attendance: 2,500; Referee: Svein Oddvar Moen |

=== Norwegian Cup ===
| 24 April 2014 First Round | Varegg | 2–3 | Brann | Bergen |
| 18:00 CEST (UTC+2) | M.Christophersen 5'; S.Bjordal 31' | Summary | Larsen 27', 51'; A.Vindheim 62' | Stadium: Stemmemyren sports Attendance: 900; Referee: Kristoffer Hagenes |

| 7 May 2014 Second Round | Stord | 1–2 | Brann | Stord |
| 18:00 CEST (UTC+2) | T.Skaar 12' | Summary | Larsen 48'; Lorentzen 52' | Stadium: Stord Stadium; Attendance: 1,974; Referee: Kai Erik Steen |

| 4 June 2014 Third Round | Fyllingsdalen | 1–3 | Brann | Bergen |
| 18:05 CEST (UTC+2) | E.Kampenes 4'; A.El-Amrani (yellow card) 51' (yellow-red card) 90+2' | Summary | Askar 54'; Orlov 71'; Huseklepp 90' | Stadium: Varden Amfi; Attendance: 3,798; Referee: Jan Morten Tennøy |

| 27 June 2014 Fourth Round | Brann | 4–2 | Ranheim | Bergen |
| 20:00 CEST (UTC+2) | Askar 14'; Haugen 30'; Barmen 53'; Huseklepp 90' | Summary | Reginiussen 39'; Blakstad 88' | Stadium: Brann Stadion; Attendance: 2,656; Referee: Ola Hobber Nilsen |

| 14 August 2014 Quarter-finals | Odd | 3–1 | Brann | Skien |
| 20:00 CEST (UTC+2) | Shala 66' (pen.), 87'; Kjelsrud Johansen 78' | Summary | Huseklepp 24' | Stadium: Skagerak Arena; Attendance: 8,348; Referee: Dag Vidar Hafsås |

== Squad statistics ==
As of match played 9 November 2014

=== Appearances and goals ===
| No. | Pos | Nat | Player | Total | | Tippeligaen | | Norwegian Cup | |
| No. | Pos | Nat | Player | Apps | Goals | Apps | Goals | Apps | Goals |
|---|---|---|---|---|---|---|---|---|---|
| 1 | GK | (Norway) NOR | Ådne Nissestad | 2 | 0 | 1 | 0 | 1 | 0 |
| 2 | DF | (Iceland) ISL | Birkir Sævarsson | 23 | 1 | 13+7 | 1 | 2+1 | 0 |
| 3 | DF | (Norway) NOR | Erlend Hanstveit | 27 | 1 | 20+2 | 1 | 5 | 0 |
| 4 | MF | (Norway) NOR | Eirik Birkelund | 2 | 0 | 0+2 | 0 | 0 | 0 |
| 5 | DF | (North Macedonia) MKD | Daniel Mojsov | 20 | 2 | 16+1 | 2 | 3 | 0 |
| 6 | DF | (Norway) NOR | Vadim Demidov | 5 | 0 | 5 | 0 | 0 | 0 |
| 7 | MF | (Norway) NOR | Hassan El Fakiri | 19 | 0 | 11+5 | 0 | 1+2 | 0 |
| 8 | MF | (Norway) NOR | Fredrik Haugen | 33 | 3 | 28+1 | 2 | 4 | 1 |
| 9 | FW | (Norway) NOR | Azar Karadas | 11 | 1 | 9+1 | 1 | 1 | 0 |
| 10 | FW | (Sweden) SWE | Jakob Orlov | 32 | 10 | 25+4 | 9 | 3 | 1 |
| 12 | GK | (Norway) NOR | Øystein Øvretveit | 2 | 0 | 2 | 0 | 0 | 0 |
| 15 | FW | (Senegal) SEN | Ibrahima Dramé | 6 | 0 | 0+5 | 0 | 1 | 0 |
| 17 | MF | (Senegal) SEN | Stéphane Badji | 24 | 0 | 17+4 | 0 | 3 | 0 |
| 18 | DF | (Sweden) SWE | Markus Jonsson | 7 | 0 | 7 | 0 | 0 | 0 |
| 19 | FW | (Norway) NOR | Marcus Pedersen | 11 | 3 | 10 | 3 | 0+1 | 0 |
| 20 | FW | (Norway) NOR | Håkon Lorentzen | 10 | 3 | 1+6 | 2 | 2+1 | 1 |
| 21 | DF | (Norway) NOR | Andreas Vindheim | 25 | 3 | 20+1 | 2 | 4 | 1 |
| 22 | MF | (Norway) NOR | Amin Askar | 33 | 6 | 19+10 | 4 | 3+1 | 2 |
| 23 | FW | (Norway) NOR | Erik Huseklepp | 34 | 4 | 22+7 | 2 | 3+2 | 2 |
| 24 | GK | (Poland) POL | Piotr Leciejewski | 31 | 0 | 27 | 0 | 4 | 0 |
| 26 | MF | (Norway) NOR | Kasper Skaanes | 32 | 5 | 24+4 | 5 | 3+1 | 0 |
| 27 | DF | (Sweden) SWE | Erdin Demir | 18 | 0 | 13+4 | 0 | 1 | 0 |
| 29 | MF | (Norway) NOR | Kristoffer Barmen | 30 | 2 | 19+6 | 1 | 4+1 | 1 |
| 30 | DF | (Norway) NOR | Jonas Grønner | 27 | 3 | 19+4 | 3 | 4 | 0 |
| 34 | MF | (Norway) NOR | Simen Lassen | 1 | 0 | 0 | 0 | 0+1 | 0 |
Players away from the club on loan:
| 19 | FW | (Norway) NOR | Kristoffer Larsen | 14 | 4 | 2+9 | 1 | 3 | 3 |
Players who played for Brann that left during the season:

=== Goal scorers ===
| Place | Position | Nation | Number | Name | Tippeligaen | Norwegian Cup | Total |
|---|---|---|---|---|---|---|---|
| 1 | FW | (Sweden) | 10 | Jakob Orlov | 9 | 1 | 10 |
| 2 | MF | (Norway) | 22 | Amin Askar | 4 | 2 | 6 |
| 3 | MF | (Norway) | 26 | Kasper Skaanes | 5 | 0 | 5 |
| 3 | FW | (Norway) | 23 | Erik Huseklepp | 2 | 3 | 5 |
| 5 | FW | (Norway) | 19 | Kristoffer Larsen | 1 | 3 | 4 |
| 6 | MF | (Norway) | 19 | Marcus Pedersen | 3 | 0 | 3 |
| 6 | DF | (Norway) | 30 | Jonas Grønner | 3 | 0 | 3 |
| 6 | FW | (Norway) | 20 | Håkon Lorentzen | 2 | 1 | 3 |
| 6 | MF | (Norway) | 8 | Fredrik Haugen | 2 | 1 | 3 |
| 6 | DF | (Norway) | 21 | Andreas Vindheim | 2 | 1 | 3 |
| 11 | DF | (North Macedonia) | 5 | Daniel Mojsov | 2 | 0 | 2 |
| 11 | | | | Own goal | 2 | 0 | 2 |
| 11 | MF | (Norway) | 29 | Kristoffer Barmen | 1 | 1 | 2 |
| 14 | DF | (Norway) | 3 | Erlend Hanstveit | 1 | 0 | 1 |
| 14 | DF | (Iceland) | 2 | Birkir Sævarsson | 1 | 0 | 1 |
| 14 | FW | (Norway) | 9 | Azar Karadas | 1 | 0 | 1 |
| | | | | TOTALS | 41 | 13 | 54 |

=== Disciplinary record ===
| Number | Nation | Position | Name | Tippeligaen | | Norwegian Cup | | Total | |
| Number | Nation | Position | Name | Yellow card | Red card | Yellow card | Red card | Yellow card | Red card |
| 2 | (Iceland) | DF | Birkir Sævarsson | 5 | 0 | 1 | 0 | 6 | 0 |
| 3 | (Norway) | DF | Erlend Hanstveit | 0 | 0 | 1 | 0 | 4 | 0 |
| 5 | (North Macedonia) | DF | Daniel Mojsov | 7 | 1 | 1 | 0 | 8 | 1 |
| 6 | (Norway) | DF | Vadim Demidov | 3 | 0 | 0 | 0 | 3 | 0 |
| 7 | (Norway) | MF | Hassan El Fakiri | 3 | 0 | 0 | 0 | 3 | 0 |
| 8 | (Norway) | MF | Fredrik Haugen | 2 | 0 | 1 | 0 | 3 | 0 |
| 9 | (Norway) | FW | Azar Karadas | 2 | 0 | 0 | 0 | 2 | 0 |
| 15 | (Senegal) | FW | Ibrahima Dramé | 1 | 0 | 0 | 0 | 1 | 0 |
| 17 | (Senegal) | MF | Stéphane Badji | 4 | 1 | 2 | 0 | 6 | 1 |
| 19 | (Norway) | FW | Marcus Pedersen | 3 | 0 | 0 | 0 | 3 | 0 |
| 20 | (Norway) | FW | Håkon Lorentzen | 0 | 0 | 2 | 0 | 2 | 0 |
| 21 | (Norway) | DF | Andreas Vindheim | 1 | 0 | 0 | 0 | 1 | 0 |
| 22 | (Norway) | MF | Amin Askar | 2 | 0 | 1 | 0 | 3 | 0 |
| 24 | (Poland) | GK | Piotr Leciejewski | 3 | 0 | 0 | 0 | 3 | 0 |
| 26 | (Norway) | MF | Kasper Skaanes | 1 | 0 | 0 | 0 | 1 | 0 |
| 27 | (Sweden) | DF | Erdin Demir | 2 | 0 | 0 | 0 | 2 | 0 |
| 29 | (Norway) | MF | Kristoffer Barmen | 4 | 0 | 0 | 0 | 4 | 0 |
| 30 | (Norway) | DF | Jonas Grønner | 2 | 0 | 1 | 0 | 3 | 0 |
| | | | TOTALS | 45 | 2 | 10 | 0 | 55 | 2 |
