= 2013 SK Brann season =

Brann
2013 season
- Chairman: Lars Moldestad
- Head coach: Rune Skarsfjord
- Stadium: Brann Stadion
- Tippeligaen: 8th
- Norwegian Cup: Third Round vs Mjøndalen
- Top goalscorer: League: Amin Askar & Martin Pusic (9); All: Martin Pusic (13)
- Highest home attendance: 17,179 vs Aalesund; 16 May 2013
- Lowest home attendance: 9,348 vs Hønefoss; 27 October 2013
- Average home league attendance: 11,306; 13 November 2013

The 2013 season was Brann's 27th consecutive year in Tippeligaen and their third full season with Rune Skarsfjord as their manager. They participated in the Tippeligaen, finishing 8th, and the Cup where they reached the Third Round before defeat by Adeccoligaen side Mjøndalen.

== Squad ==
As of 22 May 2013

Note: Flags indicate national team as defined under FIFA eligibility rules; some limited exceptions apply. Players may hold more than one non-FIFA nationality.

No.	Pos.	Nation	Player
1	GK	NOR	Jørgen Mohus
2	DF	ISL	Birkir Sævarsson
4	DF	NOR	Simen Wangberg
5	DF	MKD	Daniel Mojsov
7	DF	NOR	Hassan El Fakiri
8	MF	NOR	Fredrik Haugen
9	FW	AUT	Martin Pusic
12	GK	NOR	Øystein Øvretveit
17	MF	SEN	Stéphane Badji
18	DF	SWE	Markus Jonsson (Captain)
19	FW	NOR	Kristoffer Larsen
22	FW	NOR	Amin Askar

No.	Pos.	Nation	Player
23	FW	NOR	Erik Huseklepp
24	GK	POL	Piotr Leciejewski
25	DF	NOR	Henrik Gjesdal
26	MF	NOR	Kasper Skaanes
27	DF	SWE	Erdin Demir
28	FW	NOR	Bård Finne
29	MF	NOR	Kristoffer Barmen
30	DF	NOR	Jonas Grønner
32	MF	NOR	Tomasz Sokolowski (Vice-captain)
36	GK	NOR	Ådne Nissestad (junior player)
37	FW	NOR	Håkon Lorentzen (junior player)

=== Reserve squad ===
As of February, 2013, according to official Brann website.

Note: Flags indicate national team as defined under FIFA eligibility rules; some limited exceptions apply. Players may hold more than one non-FIFA nationality.

No.	Pos.	Nation	Player
33	MF	NOR	Kjetil Kalve
35	DF	NOR	Andreas Vindheim
37	FW	NOR	Håkon Lorentzen
38	FW	NOR	Steffen Lie Skålevik
—	GK	NOR	Sondre Aasen
—	DF	NOR	Matias Sjursæther
—	DF	NOR	Thor Kristian Økland
—	DF	NOR	Fredrik Heggland
—	DF	NOR	Brian Jensen
—	DF	NOR	Thomas Kristensen
—	DF	NOR	Kapinga Brazy
—	MF	NOR	Joachim Soltvedt

No.	Pos.	Nation	Player
—	MF	NOR	Lars Kallevik (junior player)
—	MF	NOR	Simen Lassen
—	MF	NOR	Vladan Radojkic
—	MF	NOR	Petter Ingebrigtsen
—	MF	NOR	Fredrik P. Knudsen
—	MF	NOR	Per Chr. Pedersen
—	MF	NOR	Kristoffer Larsen
—	FW	NOR	Morten Kvist
—	FW	NOR	Didrik Angell
—	FW	NOR	Michael Sutton
—	FW	THA	Kittiphong Pluemjai

== Transfers ==
=== Winter ===
In: Note: Flags indicate national team as defined under FIFA eligibility rules; some limited exceptions apply. Players may hold more than one non-FIFA nationality.

No.	Pos.	Nation	Player
9	FW	AUT	Martin Pusic (from Fredrikstad)
11	FW	RUS	Vasili Pavlov (loan from Dacia Chișinău)
17	FW	SEN	Stéphane Badji (from Sogndal)
26	MF	NOR	Kasper Skaanes
25	DF	NOR	Henrik Gjesdal

Out: Note: Flags indicate national team as defined under FIFA eligibility rules; some limited exceptions apply. Players may hold more than one non-FIFA nationality.

No.	Pos.	Nation	Player
3	DF	NOR	Christian Kalvenes (Retired)
9	FW	NGR	Kim Ojo (to Genk)
10	MF	NOR	Erik Mjelde (to Lillestrøm SK)
11	FW	NGR	Bentley (to Wuhan Zall)

=== Summer ===
In: Note: Flags indicate national team as defined under FIFA eligibility rules; some limited exceptions apply. Players may hold more than one non-FIFA nationality.

No.	Pos.	Nation	Player
5	DF	MKD	Daniel Mojsov (from FK Vojvodina)

Out: Note: Flags indicate national team as defined under FIFA eligibility rules; some limited exceptions apply. Players may hold more than one non-FIFA nationality.

No.	Pos.	Nation	Player
11	FW	RUS	Vasili Pavlov (loan return to Dacia Chişinău)
14	MF=to Odd	NOR	Fredrik Nordkvelle
21	DF	HUN	Zsolt Korcsmár (to Greuter Fürth)

== Competitions ==
=== Tippeligaen ===
==== Results summary ====
Overall								Home						Away					
Pld	W	D	L	GF	GA	GD	Pts	W	D	L	GF	GA	GD	W	D	L	GF	GA	GD
30	12	5	13	42	44	−2	41	10	2	2	21	9	+12	2	3	11	21	35	−14

Last updated: 10 November 2013.
Source: see below

==== Results by round ====
Round	1	2	3	4	5	6	7	8	9	10	11	12	13	14	15	16	17	18	19	20	21	22	23	24	25	26	27	28	29	30
Ground	H	A	H	A	H	H	A	H	A	H	A	H	A	H	A	A	H	A	H	A	A	H	A	H	A	H	A	H	A	H
Result	W	L	W	L	W	W	L	W	L	W	L	W	L	W	D	D	L	L	D	L	W	W	L	D	D	L	L	D	L	W
Position	2	11	4	6	4	4	4	4	3	3	4	4	5	4	4	4	5	6	6	6	6	7	7	7	7	7	8	8	8	8

Updated to match(es) played on 10 November 2013. Source: see below
A = Away; H = Home; W = Win; D = Draw; L = Loss

==== Results ====
17 March 2013 1	Brann	3–1	Vålerenga	Bergen
18:00 CET (UTC+1)	Haugen 13'; Larsen 47'; Nordkvelle 74'	Summary	Børven 77'	Stadium: Brann Stadion; Attendance: 12,102; Referee: Svein Oddvar Moen

1 April 2013 2	Rosenborg	4–0	Brann	Trondheim
18:00 CEST (UTC+2)	Dorsin 48', 90+1'; Diskerud 53'; Dočkal 85'	Summary		Stadium: Lerkendal Stadion; Attendance: 16,009; Referee: Svein-Erik Edvartsen

6 April 2013 3	Brann	1–0	Molde	Bergen
18:00 CEST (UTC+2)	Askar 80'	Summary		Stadium: Brann Stadion; Attendance: 10,608; Referee: Espen Berntsen

14 April 2013 4	Lillestrøm	2–0	Brann	Lillestrøm
19:00 CEST (UTC+2)	Moen 58'; Helstad 62'	Summary		Stadium: Åråsen Stadion; Attendance: 4,637; Referee: Per Ivar Staberg

20 April 2013 5	Brann	2–0	Viking	Bergen
18:00 CEST (UTC+2)	Huseklepp 3'; Nordkvelle 19'	Summary		Stadium: Brann Stadion; Attendance: 11,458; Referee: Svein Erik Edvartsen

26 April 2013 6	Brann	2–0	Odd	Bergen
19:00 CEST (UTC+2)	Huseklepp 45', 52'	Summary		Stadium: Brann Stadion; Attendance: 10,212; Referee: Trygve Kjensli

5 May 2013 7	Sogndal	3–1	Brann	Sogndalsfjøra
19:00 CEST (UTC+2)	Karadas 25'; Mane 49', 85'	Summary	Grønner (yellow card) 40' (yellow-red card) 54'; Askar 90'	Stadium: Fosshaugane Campus; Attendance: 4,063; Referee: Ken Henry Johnsen

9 May 2013 8	Brann	2–0	Start	Bergen
19:00 CEST (UTC+2)	Sokolowski 19'; Askar 52'	Summary		Stadium: Brann Stadion; Attendance: 10,702; Referee: Dag Vidar Hafsås

12 May 2013 9	Strømsgodset	2–0	Brann	Drammen
18:00 CEST (UTC+2)	Gjesdal 20' (o.g.); Diomande 41'	Summary		Stadium: Marienlyst Stadion; Attendance: 6,859; Referee: Svein Oddvar Moen

16 May 2013 10	Brann	2–0	Aalesund	Bergen
18:00 CEST (UTC+2)	Finne 45'; Sævarsson 52'	Summary		Stadium: Brann Stadion; Attendance: 17,179; Referee: Svein Oddvar Moen

20 May 2013 11	Tromsø	2–0	Brann	Tromsø
19:00 CEST (UTC+2)	Bendiksen 76' (pen.); Nystrøm 90'	Summary		Stadium: Alfheim Stadion; Attendance: 5,171; Referee: Espen Berntsen

26 May 2013 12	Brann	3–1	Sarpsborg 08	Bergen
19:00 CEST (UTC+2)	Pusic 20'; Finne 45'; Korcsmár 81'	Summary	Wiig 64'	Stadium: Brann Stadion; Attendance: 10,257; Referee: Tore Hansen

23 June 2013 13	Haugesund	2–1	Brann	Haugesund
19:00 CEST (UTC+2)	Bamberg 3', 60'	Summary	Askar 90+1'	Stadium: Haugesund Stadion; Attendance: 5,152; Referee: Brage Sandmoen

30 June 2013 14	Brann	6–1	Sandnes Ulf	Bergen
15:30 CEST (UTC+2)	Pusic 5'; Finne 22', 39', 45+1'; Sævarsson 51'; Askar 87'	Summary	Jonsson 73' (o.g.)	Stadium: Brann Stadion; Attendance: 10,427; Referee: Omar Rafiq

8 July 2013 15	Hønefoss	1–1	Brann	Hønefoss
19:00 CEST (UTC+2)	Kaland 16'	Summary	Huseklepp 7'	Stadium: Aka Arena; Attendance: 3,076; Referee: Tom Harald Hagen

13 July 2013 16	Start	3–3	Brann	Kristiansand
18:00 CEST (UTC+2)	Vikstøl 3'; Asante 24'; Kristjánsson 76'; Owello (red card) 90+5'	Summary	Pusic 8'; Andersen 47' (o.g.); Larsen 71'	Stadium: Sør Arena; Attendance: 6,214; Referee: Svein Oddvar Moen

28 July 2013 17	Brann	1–4	Rosenborg	Bergen
18:00 CET (UTC+2)	Askar 90+4'	Summary	Nilsen 7'; Jensen 53'; Søderlund 56'; Chibuike 90'	Stadium: Brann Stadion; Attendance: 12,678; Referee: Tommy Skjerven

4 August 2013 18	Molde	2–0	Brann	Molde
15:30 CEST (UTC+2)	Berget 32'; Gulbrandsen 74'	Summary	Mojsov (yellow card) 4' (yellow-red card) 14'	Stadium: Aker Stadion; Attendance: 8,628; Referee: Svein Erik Edvartsen

9 August 2013 19	Brann	1–1	Lillestrøm	Bergen
19:00 CEST (UTC+2)	Askar 82'	Summary	Riise 41'	Stadium: Brann Stadion; Attendance: 10,077; Referee: Tom Harald Hagen

18 August 2013 20	Viking	3–2	Brann	Stavanger
19:00 CEST (UTC+2)	Sulimani 27'; Thioune 59'; Olsen 68'	Summary	Pusic 9'; Mojsov 21'	Stadium: Viking Stadion; Attendance: 13,064; Referee: Per Ivar Staberg

24 August 2013 21	Odd	1–3	Brann	Skien
18:00 CEST (UTC+2)	Johnsen 5'	Summary	Pusic 27', 90+2'; Barmen 83'	Stadium: Skagerak Arena; Attendance: 6,186; Referee: Svein Oddvar Moen

30 August 2013 22	Brann	1–0	Sogndal	Bergen
19:00 CEST (UTC+2)	Pusic 6'; Haugen (yellow card) 43' (yellow-red card); Askar (yellow card) 70'; Demir (yellow card) 78'	Summary	Ruben Holsæter (yellow card) 62'; Karadas (yellow card) 70'; Patronen (yellow card) 90'	Stadium: Brann Stadion; Attendance: 12,200; Referee: Kristoffer Helgerud

15 September 2013 23	Vålerenga	4–3	Brann	Oslo
18:00 CEST (UTC+2)	Berre 4', 61'; Børven 74', 84'	Summary	Pusic 9'; Huseklepp 10'; Barmen 17'	Stadium: Ullevaal Stadion; Attendance: 10,642; Referee: Espen Berntsen

21 September 2013 24	Brann	1–1	Strømsgodset	Bergen
18:00 CEST (UTC+2)	Huseklepp 48'; Demir (yellow card) 51'; Haugen (yellow card) 58'	Summary	Adjei-Boateng (yellow card) 40'; Storflor 65'	Stadium: Brann Stadion; Attendance: 10,296; Referee: Per Staberg

28 September 2013 25	Aalesund	0–0	Brann	Ålesund
18:00 CEST (UTC+2)		Summary	Pusic (yellow card) 86'	Stadium: Color Line Stadion; Attendance: 7,901; Referee: Brage Sandmoen

4 October 2013 26	Brann	0–1	Haugesund	Bergen
19:00 CEST (UTC+2)		Summary	Gytkjær 76'; Andreassen (yellow card) 90+3'	Stadium: Brann Stadion; Attendance: 10,229; Referee: Ken Henry Johnsen

18 October 2013 27	Sarpsborg 08	3–2	Brann	Sarpsborg
19:00 CEST (UTC+2)	Elyounoussi 28', 45'; Ernemann (yellow card) 39' (goal) 44'; Valdimarsson (yellow card) 85'	Summary	Askar 2'; Huseklepp (yellow card) 15'; Pusic 67'; Mojsov (yellow card) 84'	Stadium: Sarpsborg Stadion; Attendance: 3,299; Referee: Brage Sandmoen

27 October 2013 28	Brann	0–0	Hønefoss	Bergen
18:00 CET (UTC+1)	Badji (yellow card) 55'; Mojsov (yellow card) 72'	Summary	Haugen (yellow card) 3'; Tor Øyvind Hovda (yellow card) 13'	Stadium: Brann Stadion; Attendance: 9,348; Referee: Omar Rafiq

3 November 2013 29	Sandnes	3–1	Brann	Sandnes
18:00 CET (UTC+1)	Helle 10', 47', 60'	Summary	Barmen 43'	Stadium: Sandnes Idrettspark; Attendance: 3,632; Referee: Per Staberg

10 November 2013 30	Brann	4–1	Tromsø	Bergen
18:00 CET (UTC+1)	Sævarsson 21'; Huseklepp (yellow card) 28' (goal) 42' (pen.); Askar 77'; Lorentzen 90+1'	Summary	Bendiksen 24' (pen.) (yellow card) 45'; Čaušević (yellow card) 28'; Pritchard (yellow card) 69'	Stadium: Brann Stadion; Attendance: 11,814; Referee: Tom Harald Hagen

==== Table ====
Pos	Team	Pld	W	D	L	GF	GA	GD	Pts	Qualification or relegation
6	Molde	30	12	8	10	47	38	+9	44	Qualification for the Europa League second qualifying round (Note: Molde qualified for the second qualifying round of the UEFA Europa League as winners of the 2013 Norwegian Cup.)
7	Odd	30	11	7	12	43	39	+4	40	
8	Brann	30	11	6	13	46	46	0	39	
9	Start	30	10	8	12	43	46	−3	38	
10	Lillestrøm	30	9	9	12	37	44	−7	36	

Source: fotball.no
Rules for classification: 1) points; 2) goal difference; 3) number of goals scored.

=== Norwegian Cup ===
17 April 2013 First Round	Hovding	0–14	Brann	Bergen
18:00 CEST (UTC+2)		Summary	Gjesdal 5'; Barmen 12', 42', 74'; Finne 14', 64', 83', 81'; Kalve 24', 50'; Pavlov 53'; Larsen 61', 89', 90'	Stadium: Åstveit idrettspark Attendance: 503; Referee: Petter Toppe

1 May 2013 Second Round	Øystese	1–6	Brann	Øystese
18:00 CEST (UTC+2)	S.Thune 10'	Summary; Summary	Finne 16', 87'; Pusić 17', 21', 52'; Huseklepp 79'	Stadium: Øystese idrettsplass Attendance: 1,900; Referee: Kai Erik Steen

29 May 2013 Third Round	Brann	1–2	Mjøndalen	Bergen
18:00 CEST (UTC+2)	Pusic 14'	Summary	Kirkevold 50', 52'	Stadium: Brann Stadion; Attendance: 2,399; Referee: Ole Gya

== Squad statistics ==
As of 29 August 2013

=== Appearances and goals ===
No.	Pos	Nat	Player	Total		Tippeligaen		Norwegian Cup	
No.	Pos	Nat	Player	Apps	Goals	Apps	Goals	Apps	Goals
1	GK	(Norway) NOR	Jørgen Mohus	5	0	2+1	0	2+0	0
2	DF	(Iceland) ISL	Birkir Sævarsson	23	2	21+0	2	2+0	0
4	DF	(Norway) NOR	Simen Wangberg	5	0	5+0	0	0+0	0
5	DF	(North Macedonia) MKD	Daniel Mojsov	4	1	4+0	1	0+0	0
7	MF	(Norway) NOR	Hassan El Fakiri	13	0	7+4	0	2+0	0
8	MF	(Norway) NOR	Fredrik Haugen	19	1	19+0	1	0+0	0
9	FW	(Austria) AUT	Martin Pusic	21	10	19+0	6	2+0	4
17	FW	(Senegal) SEN	Stéphane Badji	21	0	17+3	0	1+0	0
18	DF	(Sweden) SWE	Markus Jonsson	6	0	6+0	0	0+0	0
19	FW	(Norway) NOR	Kristoffer Larsen	20	5	7+10	2	1+2	3
20	FW	(Norway) NOR	Kjetil Kalve	1	2	0+0	0	1+0	2
22	MF	(Norway) NOR	Amin Askar	23	7	21+0	7	1+1	0
23	FW	(Norway) NOR	Erik Huseklepp	23	5	21+0	4	2+0	1
24	GK	(Poland) POL	Piotr Leciejewski	20	0	19+0	0	1+0	0
25	DF	(Norway) NOR	Henrik Gjesdal	14	0	9+4	0	1+0	0
26	MF	(Norway) NOR	Kasper Skaanes	1	0	0+0	0	1+0	0
27	DF	(Sweden) SWE	Erdin Demir	16	0	14+1	0	1+0	0
28	FW	(Norway) NOR	Bård Finne	16	11	3+10	5	3+0	6
29	MF	(Norway) NOR	Kristoffer Barmen	15	4	4+9	1	2+0	3
30	DF	(Norway) NOR	Jonas Grønner	8	0	2+3	0	2+1	0
32	MF	(Norway) NOR	Tomasz Sokolowski	20	1	9+8	1	3+0	0
35	MF	(Norway) NOR	Kjetil Kalve	0	0	0+0	0	0+0	0
35	DF	(Norway) NOR	Andreas Vindheim	1	0	0+0	0	0+1	0
37	FW	(Norway) NOR	Håkon Lorentzen	1	0	0+1	0	0+0	0
39	MF	(Norway) NOR	Simen Lassen	1	0	0+0	0	0+1	0
	GK	(Norway) NOR	Ådne Nissestad	0	0	0+0	0	0+0	0
	MF	(Norway) NOR	Lars Kallevik	0	0	0+0	0	0+0	0
Players away from Brann on loan:
Players who left Brann during the season:
11	FW	(Russia) RUS	Vasili Pavlov	2	1	0+0	0	1+1	1
14	MF	(Norway) NOR	Fredrik Nordkvelle	13	2	6+6	2	1+0	0
21	DF	(Hungary) HUN	Zsolt Korcsmár	17	1	15+0	1	1+1	0

=== Goal scorers ===
Place	Position	Number	Name	Tippeligaen	Norwegian Cup	Total
1	FW	9	Martin Pusic	9	4	13
2	FW	28	Bård Finne	5	6	11
3	MF	22	Amin Askar	9	0	9
4	FW	23	Erik Huseklepp	7	1	8
5	MF	29	Kristoffer Barmen	3	3	6
6	FW	19	Kristoffer Larsen	2	3	5
7	DF	2	Birkir Sævarsson	3	0	3
8	MF	14	Fredrik Nordkvelle	2	0	2
8	FW	20	Kjetil Kalve	0	2	2
10	MF	8	Fredrik Haugen	1	0	1
10	MF	32	Tomasz Sokolowski	1	0	1
10	DF	21	Zsolt Korcsmár	1	0	1
10	FW	37	Håkon Lorentzen	1	0	1
10	DF	5	Daniel Mojsov	1	0	1
10			Own goal	1	0	1
10	MF	38	Henrik Gjesdal	0	1	1
10	FW	11	Vasili Pavlov	0	1	1
			TOTALS	46	21	67

=== Disciplinary record ===
Number	Position	Name	Tippeligaen		Norwegian Cup		Total	
Number	Position	Name	Yellow card	Red card	Yellow card	Red card	Yellow card	Red card
2	DF	Birkir Sævarsson	2	0	0	0	2	0
5	DF	Daniel Mojsov	6	1	0	0	6	1
7	MF	Hassan El Fakiri	1	0	0	0	1	0
8	MF	Fredrik Haugen	9	1	0	0	9	1
9	FW	Martin Pusic	3	0	0	0	3	0
17	FW	Stéphane Badji	6	0	0	0	6	0
18	DF	Markus Jonsson	1	0	0	0	1	0
19	FW	Kristoffer Larsen	1	0	0	0	1	0
21	DF	Zsolt Korcsmár	2	0	0	0	2	0
22	MF	Amin Askar	3	0	0	0	3	0
23	FW	Erik Huseklepp	3	0	0	0	3	0
24	GK	Piotr Leciejewski	1	0	1	0	2	0
25	DF	Henrik Gjesdal	2	0	0	0	2	0
27	DF	Erdin Demir	3	0	0	0	3	0
29	MF	Kristoffer Barmen	2	0	0	0	2	0
30	DF	Jonas Grønner	2	1	0	0	2	1
32	MF	Tomasz Sokolowski	1	0	0	0	1	0
		TOTALS	48	3	1	0	49	3
