= Erlend =

Erlend may refer to:

- Erlend Apneseth (born 1990), award-winning hardingfele player
- Erlend Bjøntegaard (born 1990), Norwegian biathlete
- Erlend Bratland (born 1991), Norwegian singer
- Erlend Caspersen (born 1982), Norwegian bassist
- Erlend Engelsvoll (born 1975), Norwegian former professional racing cyclist
- Erlend Erichsen of Gorgoroth, a Norwegian black metal band
- Erlend Fuglum (born 1978), Norwegian politician for the Centre Party
- Erlend Hanstveit (born 1981), former Norwegian footballer
- Erlend Haraldsson, joint Earl of Orkney from 1151 to 1154
- Erlend Hjelvik of Kvelertak, a Norwegian heavy metal band from Stavanger
- Erlend Holm (born 1983), former Norwegian football defender
- Erlend Jentoft (born 1976), Norwegian saxophonist and composer
- Leif Erlend Johannessen (born 1980), Norwegian chess player and Norway's fifth grandmaster
- Erlend Larsen (born 1965), Norwegian politician
- Erlend Lesund (born 1994), Norwegian ice hockey player
- Erlend Loe (born 1969), Norwegian novelist, screenwriter and film critic
- Erlend Mamelund (born 1984), Norwegian handball player
- Erlend Ottem of Clawfinger, a heavy metal band from Sweden
- Erlend Øye (born 1975), Norwegian composer, musician, producer, singer and songwriter
- Erlend Dahl Reitan (born 1997), Norwegian professional footballer
- Erlend Rian (1941–2020), Norwegian politician who formerly represented the Conservative Party
- Erlend Segberg (born 1997), Norwegian professional footballer
- Erlend Sivertsen (born 1991), Norwegian professional footballer
- Erlend Skomsvoll (born 1969), Norwegian jazz musician, band leader, composer and arranger
- Erlend Slettevoll (born 1981), Norwegian jazz pianist
- Erlend Slokvik, Norwegian ski-orienteering competitor
- Erlend Storesund (born 1985), Norwegian footballer
- Paul and Erlend Thorfinnsson (Erlend died 1098), brothers who ruled together as Earls of Orkney
- Erlend Turf-Einarsson, a Norse jarl ruling the Norðreyjar (the islands of Orkney and Shetland)
- Erlend Tvinnereim (born 1981), Norwegian tenor based in Zürich
- Erlend Wiborg (born 1984), Norwegian politician for the Progress Party

== See also ==
- Elend (disambiguation)
- Erlen
- Erlendur (disambiguation)
