= Adne =

Adne or ADNE may refer to:

- Adne Sadeh, a mythical creature alluded to in Jewish folklore
- Ådne Søndrål (born 1971), Norwegian speed skater
- Ådne Nissestad (born 1995), Norwegian football goalkeeper
- Adne van Engelen (born 1993), Dutch cyclist
- Anglican Diocese in New England
