= Bård Finne =

Norwegian footballer (born 1995)

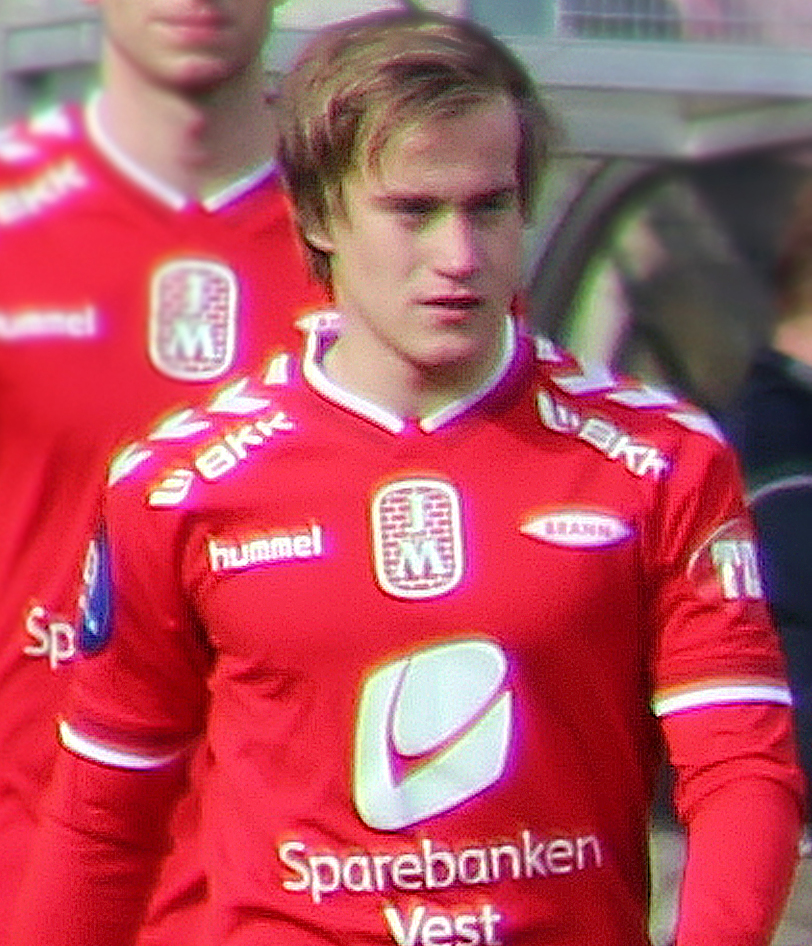
- Finne in 2013

Personal information
- Date of birth: 13 February 1995 (age 31)
- Place of birth: Bergen, Norway
- Height: 1.74 m (5 ft 9 in)
- Positions: Striker; winger

Team information
- Current team: Brann
- Number: 11

Youth career
- SK Trane
- Nymark IL
- –2012: Brann

Senior career*
Years	Team	Apps	(Gls)
2012–2013	Brann	26	(8)
2014–2016	1. FC Köln	21	(2)
2014–2015	1. FC Köln II	5	(4)
2016–2017	1. FC Heidenheim	21	(3)
2017–2021	Vålerenga	104	(30)
2021	SønderjyskE	17	(0)
2021–	Brann	145	(53)

International career^{‡}
2012	Norway U17	11	(4)
2012–2013	Norway U18	20	(7)
2013	Norway U19	8	(2)
2014–2015	Norway U21	8	(1)
2023–2024	Norway	4	(1)
- * Club domestic league appearances and goals as of 9 October 2026 ‡ National team caps and goals as of 20 July 2024

Bård Finne (born 13 February 1995) is a Norwegian professional footballer who plays as a forward for SK Brann and the Norway national team.

Hailing from Bergen, he started his professional career in Brann. Finne has represented Norway from under-15 to under-21 level.

== Club career ==
=== Brann ===
Finne was born in Bergen, with parents hailing from Voss Municipality. During his childhood, Finne participated in both athletics and cross-country skiing in addition to playing football and became regional champion in cross-country skiing while competing for Voss IL. Finne, who grew up in the area surrounding Brann Stadion, played football for SK Trane until he gave up both athletics and skiing at the age of 12 and joined Nymark IL where he played with Andreas Vindheim and Kasper Skaanes until the three joined SK Brann's youth-team together in 2009.

Before he signed a professional contract with Brann, he was eligible to play in Tippeligaen as he was listed on the team's B-list. He was wanted by Dutch club NEC Nijmegen and Ole Gunnar Solskjær's club Molde, but Finne signed a professional contract for Brann in September 2012. He scored his first two goals in Tippeligaen in the match against rivaling club Rosenborg on 23 September 2012. He made five appearances and scored three goals in the 2012 season, after which he gained the nickname "the fox in the box".

Finne's first appearance of the 2013 season, came when he replaced Kristoffer Barmen as a substitute against Lillestrøm in April 2013. In the First Round of the 2013 Norwegian Football Cup, Finne scored four goals when Brann won 14–0 against Hovding. In June 2013, Finne rejected Brann's offer for a new contract and stated that he wanted to move abroad either during the summer or when his contract expired after the season. The crowd at Brann Stadion did not like that Finne wanted to leave the club, and booed at him when he replaced Martin Pusic in the home match against Sandnes Ulf on 29 June 2013, but Finne answered by scoring a hat-trick in the 6–1 victory.

=== Cologne ===
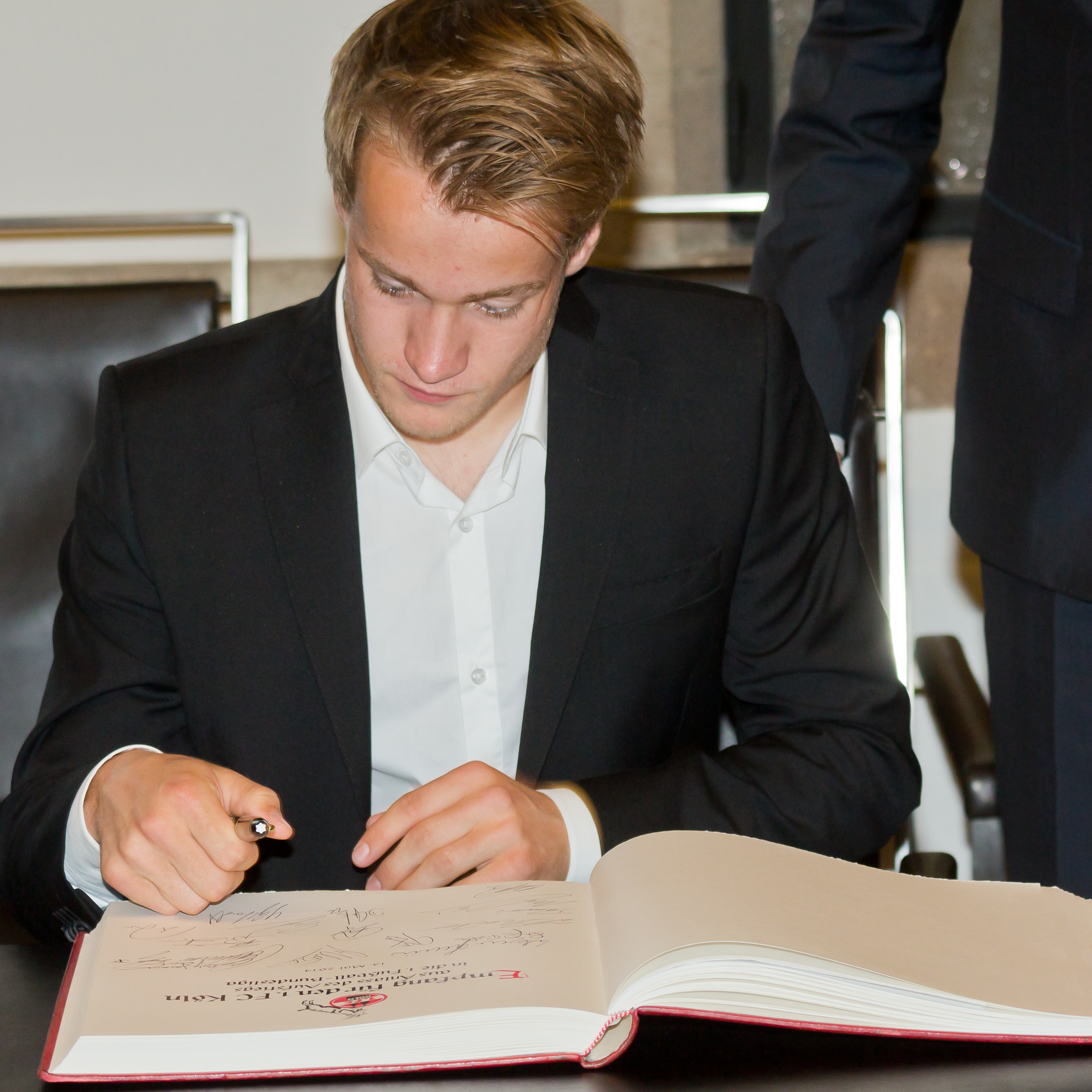
Finne in 2014 with 1. FC Köln

On 20 August 2013, it was announced that he had signed a 3.5-year contract with the 2. Bundesliga side 1. FC Köln starting in January 2014. He joined the club as a Bosman player as his contract with Brann expired on 31 December 2013. He debuted for 1. FC Köln on 9 February in the 2. Bundesliga tie against SC Paderborn at the RheinEnergie Stadion (final result 0–1) entering the pitch as a substitute for Anthony Ujah in the 46th minute.

=== Heidenheim ===
He moved to 1. FC Heidenheim on 16 January 2016. Finne played 24 games for the club and scored 3 goals.

=== Vålerenga ===
On 24 February 2017, Finne signed a four-year contract with Brann rivals Vålerenga, despite his agent stating that he would never play for another Norwegian club. On 3 April he scored the only goal in a 1–0 win on his competitive debut for Vålerenga against Viking.

=== SønderjyskE ===
On 10 October 2020 Danish Superliga club SønderjyskE confirmed, that Finne would join the club from 2021 on a deal until June 2024.

=== Return to Brann ===
On 5 August 2021, Finne returned to Norway and signed a deal until June 2025 with his former club SK Brann. He became the top scorer in the 2022 Norwegian First Division with 16 goals, alongside Gift Orban.

== International career ==
Finne first represented Norway when he played two matches for the under-15 team against Sweden U15 in September 2010. The next month he was selected for the squad that met Portugal, France and Netherlands in an under-15 tournament. He played a total of five matches for the under-15 team in 2010. The next year he played 11 matches for the under-16 team, scoring five goals. In 2012, he played 11 matches and scored four goals for the under-17 team in addition to 11 matches and three goals for the under-18 team. He made his debut for the under-19 team in 2013, and scored goals against Netherlands U19 and Cyprus U19 in the elite qualification for the 2013 UEFA European Under-19 Football Championship.

== Career statistics ==
=== Club ===
As of match played 15 October 2026

Appearances and goals by club, season and competition
Club	Season	League			National cup (Note: Includes Norwegian Football Cup, DFB-Pokal, Danish Cup)		Europe		Total	
Club	Season	Division	Apps	Goals	Apps	Goals	Apps	Goals	Apps	Goals
Brann	2012	Tippeligaen	7	3	2	1	–		9	4
Brann	2013	Tippeligaen	19	5	3	6	–		22	11
Brann	Total		26	8	5	7	0	0	31	15
1. FC Köln	2013–14	2. Bundesliga	11	1	0	0	–		11	1
1. FC Köln	2014–15	Bundesliga	10	1	0	0	–		10	1
1. FC Köln	2015–16	Bundesliga	0	0	1	0	–		1	0
1. FC Köln	Total		21	2	1	0	0	0	22	2
1. FC Heidenheim	2015–16	2. Bundesliga	14	2	1	0	–		15	2
1. FC Heidenheim	2016–17	2. Bundesliga	7	1	2	0	–		9	1
1. FC Heidenheim	Total		21	3	3	0	0	0	24	3
Vålerenga	2017	Eliteserien	24	4	3	1	–		27	5
Vålerenga	2018	Eliteserien	25	10	5	4	–		30	14
Vålerenga	2019	Eliteserien	29	8	3	3	–		32	11
Vålerenga	2020	Eliteserien	26	8	0	0	–		26	8
Vålerenga	Total		104	30	11	8	0	0	115	38
SønderjyskE	2020–21	Danish Superliga	17	0	5	1	–		22	1
Brann	2021	Eliteserien	15	4	2	0	–		17	4
Brann	2022	Norwegian First Division	29	16	8	11	–		37	27
Brann	2023	Eliteserien	29	16	9	12	4 (Note: Appearances in UEFA Conference League)	1	42	29
Brann	2024	Eliteserien	28	6	3	1	6 (Note: Appearances in UEFA Conference League)	2	37	9
Brann	2025	Eliteserien	26	6	4	4	11 (Note: Two appearances in UEFA Champions League and nine appearances in UEFA Europa League)	0	41	10
Brann	2026	Eliteserien	18	5	6	1	7 (Note: Four appearances in UEFA Europa League, three appearances in UEFA Conference League)	0	31	6
Brann	Total		145	53	32	29	28	3	205	85
Career total			334	96	57	45	28	3	419	144

=== International ===
As of match played 17 November 2023

Appearances and goals by national team and year
National team	Year	Apps	Goals
Norway	2023	4	1
Total		4	1

No.	Date	Venue	Opponent	Score	Result	Competition
1.	7 September 2023	Ullevaal Stadion, Oslo, Norway	Jordan	5–0	6–0	Friendly

== Honours ==
Brann

- Norwegian Cup: 2022

Individual

- Norwegian First Division top scorer: 2022
- Eliteserien Player of the Month: May 2023, November 2023
