= Erlendur =

Erlendur is a given name. Notable people with the given name include:

- Erlendur Haraldsson (1931–2020), psychology professor at the University of Iceland
- Erlendur Jónsson (1929–2003), Icelandic writer, poet, critic and teacher
- Erlendur Patursson (1913–1986), Faroese politician and writer
- Erlendur Valdimarsson (born 1947), Icelandic athlete

== Fictional ==
- Detective Erlendur, a character in novels by Arnaldur Indriðason
