= 2008 Tippeligaen =

64th season of top-tier football league in Norway

Tippeligaen
- Season: 2008
- Dates: 29 March – 2 November
- Champions: Stabæk; 1st title
- Relegated: HamKam
- Champions League: Stabæk
- Europa League: Vålerenga; Fredrikstad; Tromsø; Rosenborg
- Matches: 182
- Goals: 505 (2.77 per match)
- Top goalscorer: Daniel Nannskog (16 goals)
- Biggest home win: Stabæk 6–0 Strømsgodset (14 September 2009)
- Biggest away win: Aalesund 0–4 Lyn (4 May 2008)
- Highest scoring: Tromsø 4–4 Molde (18 October 2008); Stabæk 6–2 Vålerenga (26 October 2008)
- Longest winning run: 6 games Stabæk
- Longest unbeaten run: 10 games Stabæk
- Longest winless run: 9 games HamKam; Vålerenga
- Longest losing run: 5 games Strømsgodset
- Highest attendance: 24,302; Vålerenga 1–1 Rosenborg (20 April 2008)
- Lowest attendance: 2,165; Lyn 2–1 Strømsgodset (20 July 2008)
- Average attendance: 9,812 ▼6.7%

The 2008 Tippeligaen was the 64th completed season of top division football in Norway. The season began on 29 March and ended 2 November. Brann were the defending champions, having won their third Tippeligaen championship in 2007. The teams promoted from the 1. divisjon at the end of the previous season were champions Molde, automatic qualifiers HamKam, and play-off winners Bodø/Glimt.

== Overview ==
=== Summary ===
Stabæk secured their first ever league championship by defeating Vålerenga 6–2 in the penultimate round. From the 2009 season onwards, the number of teams in the Tippeligaen was expanded from fourteen to sixteen. To accommodate this expansion, only one team faced automatic relegation to the 1. divisjon, as opposed to the regular two, while the three best teams in the 1. divisjon were awarded automatic promotion. As in previous years, there was a two-legged playoff at the end of the season, this time between the thirteenth-placed team in the Tippeligaen and the fourth best team in the 1. divisjon.

== Teams ==
=== Stadiums and locations ===
Locations of the teams in 2008 Tippeligaen

Fourteen teams competed in the league – the top eleven teams from the previous season, and three teams promoted from 1. divisjon.

Note: Table lists in alphabetical order.

Team	Ap.	Location	Stadium	Turf	Capacity
Aalesund	7	Ålesund	Color Line Stadion	Artificial	10,778
Bodø/Glimt	18	Bodø	Aspmyra Stadion	Artificial	8,800
Brann	52	Bergen	Brann Stadion	Natural	17,967
Fredrikstad	39	Fredrikstad	Fredrikstad Stadion	Natural	12,800
HamKam	22	Hamar	Briskeby	Natural	7,500
Lillestrøm	45	Lillestrøm	Åråsen Stadion	Natural	12,200
Lyn	35	Oslo	Ullevaal Stadion	Natural	25,572
Molde	32	Molde	Aker Stadion	Artificial	11,167
Rosenborg	45	Trondheim	Lerkendal Stadion	Natural	21,166
Stabæk	13	Bærum	Nadderud Stadion	Natural	6,950
Strømsgodset	21	Drammen	Marienlyst Stadion	Artificial	8,500
Tromsø	22	Tromsø	Alfheim Stadion	Artificial	8,300
Vålerenga	48	Oslo	Ullevaal Stadion	Natural	25,572
Viking	59	Stavanger	Viking Stadion	Natural	16,600

=== Managerial changes ===
Team	Outgoing manager	Manner of departure	Date of vacancy	Replaced by	Date of appointment	Position in table
Lillestrøm	(Norway) Tom Nordlie	Resigned	29 May 2008	(Norway) Frode Grodås (Norway) Erland Johnsen (Norway) Erlend Slokvik (Norway) Jan Åge Fjørtoft (caretakers)	29 May 2008	13th
Aalesund	(Sweden) Sören Åkeby	Sacked	31 August 2008	(Norway) Kjetil Rekdal	4 September 2008	13th
Lyn	(Norway) Henning Berg	Mutual consent	9 September 2008	(Norway) Kent Bergersen	9 September 2008	5th
Lillestrøm	(Norway) Frode Grodås (Norway) Erland Johnsen (Norway) Erlend Slokvik (Norway) Jan Åge Fjørtoft	Released	1 January 2009	(Norway) Henning Berg	1 January 2009	off-season

== League table ==
Pos	Team	Pld	W	D	L	GF	GA	GD	Pts	Qualification or relegation
1	Stabæk (C)	26	16	6	4	58	24	+34	54	Qualification for the Champions League second qualifying round
2	Fredrikstad	26	14	6	6	38	28	+10	48	Qualification for the Europa League third qualifying round
3	Tromsø	26	12	8	6	36	23	+13	44	Qualification for the Europa League second qualifying round
4	Bodø/Glimt	26	12	6	8	37	38	−1	42	
5	Rosenborg	26	11	6	9	40	34	+6	39	Qualification for the Europa League first qualifying round (Note: Rosenborg, ranked second after already qualified Stabæk in the 2008 Fair Play competition will be granted access to the UEFA Europa League first qualifying round after Norway ranked first in the UEFA Fair Play ranking.)
6	Viking	26	11	6	9	38	32	+6	39	
7	Lyn	26	11	5	10	38	34	+4	38	
8	Brann	26	8	9	9	36	36	0	33	
9	Molde	26	7	10	9	39	43	−4	31	
10	Vålerenga	26	8	6	12	31	37	−6	30	Qualification for the Europa League third qualifying round (Note: Vålerenga qualified for the Europa League third qualifying round as 2008 Norwegian Cup winners.)
11	Strømsgodset	26	8	5	13	33	44	−11	29	
12	Lillestrøm	26	7	7	12	30	40	−10	28	
13	Aalesund (O)	26	7	4	15	29	42	−13	25	Qualification for the relegation play-offs
14	HamKam (R)	26	5	6	15	22	50	−28	21	Relegation to First Division

Source: fotball.no
Rules for classification: 1) points; 2) goal difference; 3) number of goals scored.
(C) Champions; (O) Play-off winners; (R) Relegated

== Relegation play-offs ==
By finishing 13th, Aalesund competed in a two-legged relegation play-off against Sogndal, who finished 4th in the 2008 1. divisjon, for the right to play in the 2009 Tippeligaen. Sogndal played at home first, decided in a draw held by the NFF. Aalesund won 7–2 on aggregate, thereby securing a new season in the Tippeligaen. Sogndal remained in the 1. divisjon.

8 November 2008
19:00 CET (UTC+1)

Sogndal	1–4	Aalesund
Bolseth 50'	Report	Arnefjord 22'; Aarøy 53'; Nadolski 61' (o.g.); Diego Silva 90+4'

Fosshaugane Campus, Sogndalsfjøra
Attendance: 3,553
Referee: Roy Helge Olsen, Fløy

12 November 2008
19:00 CET (UTC+1)

Aalesund	3–1	Sogndal
Aarøy 14', 31', 43'	Report	Håvard Flo 43'

Color Line Stadion, Ålesund
Attendance: 8,646
Referee: Terje Hauge, Olsvik

== Results ==
Home \ Away	AAL	BOD	SKB	FFK	HK	LSK	LYN	MFK	RBK	STB	SIF	TIL	VIF	VIK
Aalesund	—	1–0	4–2	0–0	5–0	3–0	0–4	1–1	1–2	1–2	3–1	1–3	0–0	1–2
Bodø/Glimt	2–1	—	3–1	2–1	2–0	1–0	2–1	2–2	1–1	1–1	3–2	2–0	1–2	3–2
Brann	1–2	4–1	—	4–2	4–1	2–1	2–0	3–4	0–0	1–2	1–1	1–1	1–0	1–1
Fredrikstad	5–0	2–0	1–0	—	2–1	4–0	0–2	2–1	1–1	0–3	2–1	2–0	2–1	1–0
HamKam	2–1	2–2	0–0	1–1	—	1–2	3–2	0–1	2–1	0–2	1–1	0–1	1–1	3–2
Lillestrøm	3–0	3–0	1–1	1–2	0–0	—	1–2	1–1	4–2	1–1	3–1	1–1	0–3	2–0
Lyn	3–0	3–1	1–1	0–0	2–1	1–0	—	1–3	1–2	0–2	3–2	3–3	2–0	1–1
Molde	0–0	1–2	3–2	1–2	2–0	1–1	0–1	—	1–2	0–0	0–0	0–0	5–1	2–3
Rosenborg	3–1	1–3	1–1	1–2	4–0	4–0	2–1	3–1	—	1–2	1–1	0–1	2–1	2–0
Stabæk	2–1	4–1	3–0	5–1	3–0	4–2	1–1	4–0	1–0	—	6–0	2–4	6–2	0–0
Strømsgodset	0–1	1–2	2–0	1–0	1–2	2–1	2–1	4–0	3–2	0–0	—	1–3	1–3	3–2
Tromsø	1–0	0–0	0–0	0–1	2–1	0–1	2–0	4–4	4–0	1–0	2–0	—	2–0	0–1
Vålerenga	1–0	0–0	0–1	1–1	3–0	3–1	1–2	1–2	1–1	2–1	1–2	0–0	—	0–1
Viking	2–1	2–0	1–2	1–1	3–0	0–0	2–0	3–3	0–1	4–1	1–0	2–1	2–3	—

Source: NIFS (in Norwegian)
Legend: Blue = home team win; Yellow = draw; Red = away team win.

== Season statistics ==
Sources: fotball.no (in Norwegian), TV 2 Sporten (in Norwegian)

=== Top scorers ===
Rank	Scorer	Club	Goals
1	(Sweden) Daniel Nannskog	Stabæk	16
2	(Sweden) Johan Andersson	Stabæk	12
2	(Brazil) José Mota	Molde	12
4	(Norway) Thorstein Helstad	Brann	11
4	(Canada) Olivier Occean	Lillestrøm	11
6	(Iceland) Garðar Jóhannsson	Fredrikstad	10
6	(Norway) Morten Moldskred	Tromsø	10
6	(Norway) Steffen Iversen	Rosenborg	10
6	(Iceland) Veigar Páll Gunnarsson	Stabæk	10
6	(Norway) Espen Hoff	Lyn	10
6	(Norway) Trond Olsen	Bodø/Glimt	10

=== Discipline ===
==== Player ====
- Most yellow cards: 7
  - (Denmark) David Nielsen (Strømsgodset)
  - (Norway) Vidar Riseth (Lillestrøm)
- Most red cards: 2
  - (Sweden) Abgar Barsom (Fredrikstad)
  - (Denmark) Jan Michaelsen (HamKam)
  - (Iceland) Kristján Örn Sigurðsson (Brann)

==== Club ====
- Most yellow cards: 48
  - Strømsgodset
- Most red cards: 5
  - HamKam

=== Attendances ===
Team	Stadium	Capacity	Turf	Total	Games	Average	% of Capacity
Lyn	Ullevaal Stadion	25,572	Natural	86,359	13	6,643	25.97
Vålerenga	Ullevaal Stadion	25,572	Natural	165,106	13	12,700	49.66
Rosenborg	Lerkendal stadion	21,850	Natural	246,443	13	18,957	86.76
Brann	Brann stadion	17,967	Natural	220,407	13	16,954	94.36
Viking	Viking Stadion	16,600	Natural	199,927	13	15,379	92.64
Fredrikstad	Nye Fredrikstad stadion	12,800	Natural	149,798	13	11,523	90.02
Lillestrøm	Åråsen stadion	11,637	Natural	114,242	13	8,788	75.51
Molde	Aker Stadion	11,167	Natural	106,645	13	8,203	73.45
Aalesund	Color Line Stadion	10,778	Artificial	134,725	13	10,363	96.14
Strømsgodset	Marienlyst stadion	8,500	Artificial	76,890	13	5,915	69.58
Tromsø	Alfheim stadion	8,159	Artificial	71,261	13	5,482	67.18
Bodø/Glimt	Aspmyra stadion	7,659	Artificial	71,533	13	5,503	71.85
HamKam	Briskeby gressbane	7,500	Natural	66,647	13	5,127	68.36
Stabæk	Nadderud stadion	6,550	Natural	75,203	13	5,785	88.32

Total	Games	Average
1,785,186	182	9,809

Source: VG Nett (in Norwegian)
