= Elend =

Elend may refer to:

- Elend, Saxony-Anhalt, a village at the foot of the Brocken, the highest mountain in the Harz in central Germany
- Elend (band), a French band
- Elend Venture, a fictional character
