= Erlendur Jónsson =

Icelandic author

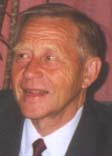
- Erlendur in 1985
- Born: 8 April 1929; Geithól, Iceland
- Died: 17 June 2023; Reykjavík, Iceland
- Spouses: Marta Ágústsdóttir ()

Erlendur Jónsson (Icelandic: [ˈɛrlɛntʏr̥ ˈjounsɔn]; 8 April 1929 – 17 Juli 2023) was an Icelandic writer and poet and former critic and teacher. He wrote novels, poetry, newspaper articles, essays and literary criticism.

== Life ==
Erlendur was born on 8 April 1929 in Geithól in Staðarhreppur in Vestur-Húnavatnsýsla. His parents were Jón Ásmundsson, a farmer and organist, and Stefanía Guðmundsdóttir (1895–1973), a midwife.

Erlendur took his matriculation exam from Menntaskólinn in Akureyri and after that began studying Icelandic and history at the University of Iceland. Then in pedagogy and finished his studies in 1953. He then studied English and American contemporary literature at the University of Bristol in England 1965–1966.

Erlendur worked at the French embassy from 1953 to 1955. He then worked as a teacher in a middle school and later at the Industrial School in Reykjavík from 1955 to 1999. He also worked as a literary critic at Morgunblaðið from 1963. From 1966 he worked on various social issues. He also gave lectures on specific literary topics at the Faculty of Philosophy of the University of Iceland in the years 1968–1975. In 1987, Erlendur won 4th prize in the National Radio's playwriting competition, for his play Minningar úr Skuggahverfi. Erlendur was married to Marta Ágústsdóttir, who was born on 29 June 1928 in Vestmannaeyjar.

Erlendur Jónsson died at Landakot Hospital on 17 July 2023 at the age of 94.

== Bibliography ==
=== Writing work ===
- 1960 Íslensk bókmenntasaga 1550 - 1950
- 1967 Skuggar á torgi, ljóð
- 1971 Íslensk skáldsagnaritun 1940 - 1970, fræðirit
- 1974 Ljóðleit
- 1978 Fyrir stríð, ljóð
- 1982 Heitu árin, ljóð
- 1984 Laufið grænt, skáldsaga
- 1987 Farseðlar til Argentínu, skáldsaga
- 1989 Borgarmúr, ljóð
- 1990 Endurfundir, skáldsaga
- 1993 Svipmót og manngerð, fræðirit
- 1999 Vatnaspegill, ljóð
- 2004 Svipmót og manngerð, 2. útgáfa aukin
- 2007 Að kvöldi dags, minningarit

=== Plays ===
- 1979 Heildsalinn, fulltrúinn og kvenmaðurinn
- 1981 Ræsting
- 1982 Líkræða
- 1987 Minningar úr Skuggahverfi

=== Other ===
- 1972 Trúarleg ljóð ungra skálda, ásamt Jóhanni Hjálmarssyni
- 1972 Moderne Weltliteratur, Stuttgart
- 1972 World Literature Since 1945, New York, London
- 1977 Literatura mundial moderna, Madrid
- 1981 Ströndin blá, eftir Kristmann Guðmundsson
- 1986 The Nordic Mind, New York, London
