= Erlend Hanstveit =

Norwegian footballer (born 1981)

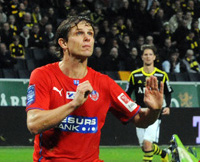

Personal information
- Full name: Erlend Hanstveit
- Date of birth: 28 January 1981 (age 45)
- Place of birth: Bergen, Norway
- Height: 1.89 m (6 ft 2 1/2 in)
- Positions: Left back; left wing back

Youth career
- –1998: Osterøy

Senior career*
Years	Team	Apps	(Gls)
1998–2008	SK Brann	202	(8)
2009–2011	Gent	50	(0)
2011–2013	Helsingborgs IF	52	(1)
2014–2015	SK Brann	29	(1)

International career^{‡}
2000–2004	Norway U21	26	(0)
2004–2005	Norway	5	(0)
- * Club domestic league appearances and goals as of 12 August 2015 ‡ National team caps and goals as of 16 May 2006

Erlend Hanstveit (born 28 January 1981) is a former Norwegian footballer and politician. He has won the Norwegian Premier League, the Norwegian Cup, the Belgian Cup and Allsvenskan, in addition to caps for the Norway national football team.

== Career ==
=== Football ===
Hailing from Osterøy Municipality, he joined Norwegian Premier League team Brann in June 1998 despite interest from big clubs like PSV Eindhoven, Leeds United and Manchester United, with whom he had a trial in December 1997. Originally a midfielder, he gradually became a first team regular at Brann as well as the Norway national under-21 football team, playing 27 international U-21 matches in total. During 2001–02, Erlend Hanstveit converted to defence, settling in the left back position, where he has played since. On 28 January 2004, his 23rd birthday, Hanstveit made his debut for the senior national team.

Hanstveit became one of the mainstays in Brann, with over 200 Norwegian Premier League matches and over 270 matches in total. During his 10-year career in Brann, Hanstveit won one Premiership gold, two silver, and two bronze, in addition to the 2004 Norwegian Cup and Norwegian Cup silver in 1999. He was also the club's vice-captain from 2004 to 2008.

In early December 2008, he joined Celtic on a week-long trial but failed to win a contract with the Scottish Premier League club. However, he did not accept Brann's contract offer either, due to his wish to play abroad. During the winter break of 2008–09 he joined the Belgian team KAA Gent, coached by Michel Preud'homme.

On 24 August 2011 it was announced that Hanstveit would be joining Swedish club Helsingborgs IF on a free transfer. Gent had wanted to extend his contract but the Norwegian wanted to move.

On 20 December 2013, Hanstveit signed a two years contract with SK Brann.

=== Politics ===
On 11 August 2023, Hanstveit was appointed State Secretary at the Ministry of Culture and Equality.

== Career statistics ==
Season	Club	Division	League		Cup		Total	
Season	Club	Division	Apps	Goals	Apps	Goals	Apps	Goals
1998	Brann	Tippeligaen	4	0	0	0	4	0
1999	Brann	Tippeligaen	11	0	4	1	11	1
2000	Brann	Tippeligaen	8	0	0	0	8	0
2001	Brann	Tippeligaen	24	1	4	0	28	1
2002	Brann	Tippeligaen	23	4	3	0	26	4
2003	Brann	Tippeligaen	17	2	2	0	19	2
2004	Brann	Tippeligaen	24	0	5	2	29	2
2005	Brann	Tippeligaen	22	1	4	2	26	3
2006	Brann	Tippeligaen	24	0	3	0	27	0
2007	Brann	Tippeligaen	19	0	4	0	23	0
2008	Brann	Tippeligaen	26	0	3	1	26	1
2008–09	Gent	Belgian Pro League	12	0	0	0	12	0
2009–10	Gent	Belgian Pro League	24	0	0	0	24	0
2010–11	Gent	Belgian Pro League	14	0	0	0	14	0
2011	Helsingborg	Allsvenskan	7	1	0	0	7	1
2012	Helsingborg	Allsvenskan	16	0	0	0	16	0
2013	Helsingborg	Allsvenskan	29	0	0	0	29	0
2014	Brann	Tippeligaen	22	1	5	0	27	1
2015	Brann	OBOS-ligaen	7	0	1	0	8	0
Career total			332	10	38	6	370	16

== Honours ==
=== Club ===
Brann

- Norwegian Premier League: 2007
- Norwegian Cup: 2004

Gent

- Belgian Cup: 2009–10

Helsingborgs IF

- Swedish Premier League: 2011
