= Jakob Orlov =

Swedish footballer

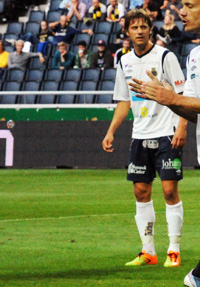

Personal information
- Full name: Jakob Orlov
- Date of birth: 15 March 1986 (age 40)
- Place of birth: Skövde, Sweden
- Height: 1.86 m (6 ft 1 in)
- Position: Forward

Youth career
- IFK Värsås

Senior career*
Years	Team	Apps	(Gls)
2007–2009	Skövde AIK	50	(28)
2010–2014	Gefle IF	113	(34)
2014–2017	SK Brann	87	(23)
2015	→ Hammarby IF (loan)	11	(2)
2018–2019	Jönköpings Södra IF	46	(11)
- * Club domestic league appearances and goals

Jakob Orlov (born 15 March 1986) is a Swedish retired footballer who played as a striker.

== Career ==
In January 2014, Orlov moved to the Tippeligaen, signing for Brann. Previously Orlov had joined Gefle in 2010 after having become the second best goalscorer of the 2009 Division 1 Södra season. In August 2015, Orlov completed a season long loan deal with Swedish side Hammarby, with winger Amadaiya Rennie moving the opposite way.

On 8 February 2020, 33-year old Orlov announced his retirement.

== Career statistics ==
As of 30 November 2017

Season	Club	Division	League		Cup		Total	
Season	Club	Division	Apps	Goals	Apps	Goals	Apps	Goals
2010	Gefle	Allsvenskan	26	9	0	0	26	9
2011	Gefle	Allsvenskan	30	8	0	0	30	8
2012	Gefle	Allsvenskan	29	9	0	0	29	9
2013	Gefle	Allsvenskan	28	8	0	0	28	8
2014	Brann	Tippeligaen	29	9	3	1	32	10
2015	Brann	OBOS-ligaen	11	4	3	1	14	5
2015	Hammarby	Allsvenskan	11	2	0	0	11	2
2016	Brann	Tippeligaen	24	5	0	0	24	5
2017	Brann	Eliteserien	23	5	2	2	25	7
Career Total			211	59	8	4	219	63
