= Kristoffer Larsen =

Norwegian footballer (born 1992)

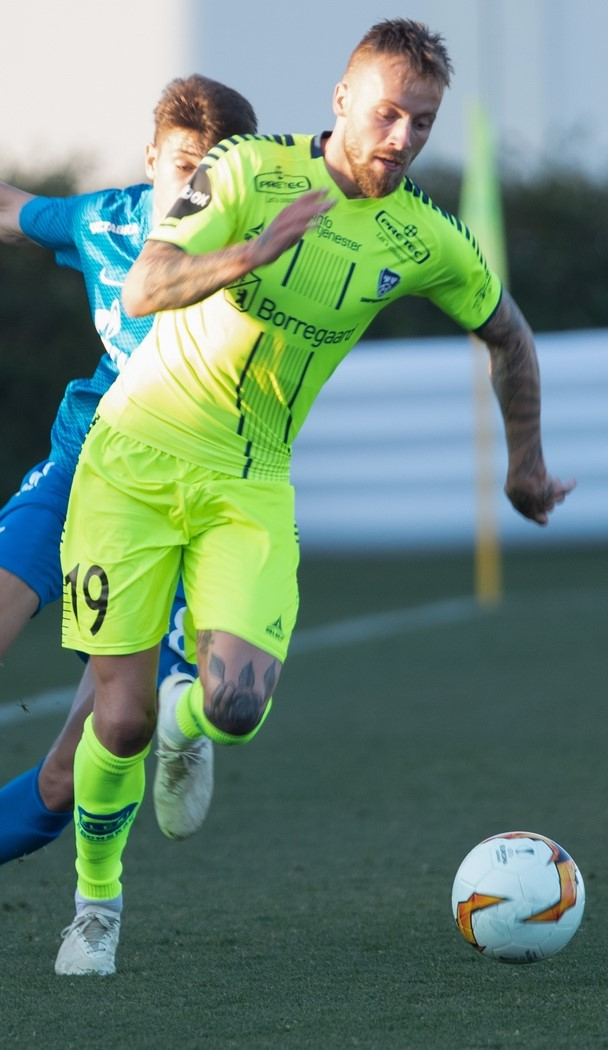

Personal information
- Full name: Kristoffer Knudsen Larsen
- Date of birth: 19 January 1992 (age 34)
- Place of birth: Bergen, Norway
- Position: Winger

Team information
- Current team: Åsane
- Number: 19

Youth career
- Vestsiden-Askøy IL

Senior career*
| Years | Team | Apps | (Gls) |
| 2011–2016 | Brann | 91 | (11) |
| 2014 | → Hønefoss (loan) | 13 | (6) |
| 2016–2018 | Lyngby | 41 | (5) |
| 2018–2019 | Sarpsborg 08 | 29 | (2) |
| 2020 | Åsane | 24 | (4) |
| 2021 | Odd | 20 | (1) |
| 2022– | Åsane | 59 | (4) |
- * Club domestic league appearances and goals as of 14 November 2024

Kristoffer Knudsen Larsen (born 19 January 1992) is a Norwegian footballer who plays for Åsane.

== Career ==
Larsen was born in Bergen and started his career at Vestsiden-Askøy IL. As an 18-year-old he got the chance in A.C. Milan's farmer-club Bellinzona on a trial. Larsen returned to Bergen where he completed the 2010 season with Askøy, before joining Brann ahead of the 2011-season. Although injuries prevented him from making the initial B-team of young players who could play in league games for Brann, impressive games for Brann 2 and in Cup games saw him offered a professional contract. He made his Tippeligaen debut when he replaced Diego Guastavino in the 77th minute against Strømsgodset on 7 August 2011.

== Career statistics ==
As of 3 October 2020

| Season | Club | Division | League | | Cup | | Europe | | Total | |
| Season | Club | Division | Apps | Goals | Apps | Goals | Apps | Goals | Apps | Goals |
|---|---|---|---|---|---|---|---|---|---|---|
| 2011 | Brann | Tippeligaen | 6 | 0 | 3 | 0 | — | | 9 | 0 |
| 2012 | Brann | Tippeligaen | 21 | 2 | 5 | 0 | — | | 26 | 2 |
| 2013 | Brann | Tippeligaen | 21 | 2 | 2 | 3 | — | | 23 | 5 |
| 2014 | Brann | Tippeligaen | 12 | 1 | 3 | 3 | — | | 15 | 4 |
| 2014 | Hønefoss | 1. divisjon | 13 | 6 | 0 | 0 | — | | 13 | 6 |
| 2015 | Brann | OBOS-ligaen | 26 | 6 | 4 | 0 | — | | 30 | 6 |
| 2016 | Brann | Tippeligaen | 5 | 0 | 1 | 0 | — | | 6 | 0 |
| 2016–17 | Lyngby BK | Superligaen | 27 | 4 | 0 | 0 | — | | 27 | 4 |
| 2017–18 | Lyngby BK | Superligaen | 14 | 1 | 0 | 0 | 5 | 2 | 19 | 3 |
| 2018 | Sarpsborg 08 | Eliteserien | 16 | 1 | 3 | 1 | 7 | 0 | 26 | 2 |
| 2019 | Sarpsborg 08 | Eliteserien | 11 | 1 | 3 | 0 | — | | 14 | 1 |
| 2020 | Åsane | OBOS-ligaen | 13 | 3 | 0 | 0 | — | | 13 | 3 |
| Career Total | | | 185 | 27 | 24 | 7 | 12 | 2 | 221 | 36 |
