= Tomasz Sokolowski (footballer, born 1985) =

Norwegian footballer (born 1985)

Tomasz Sokołowski
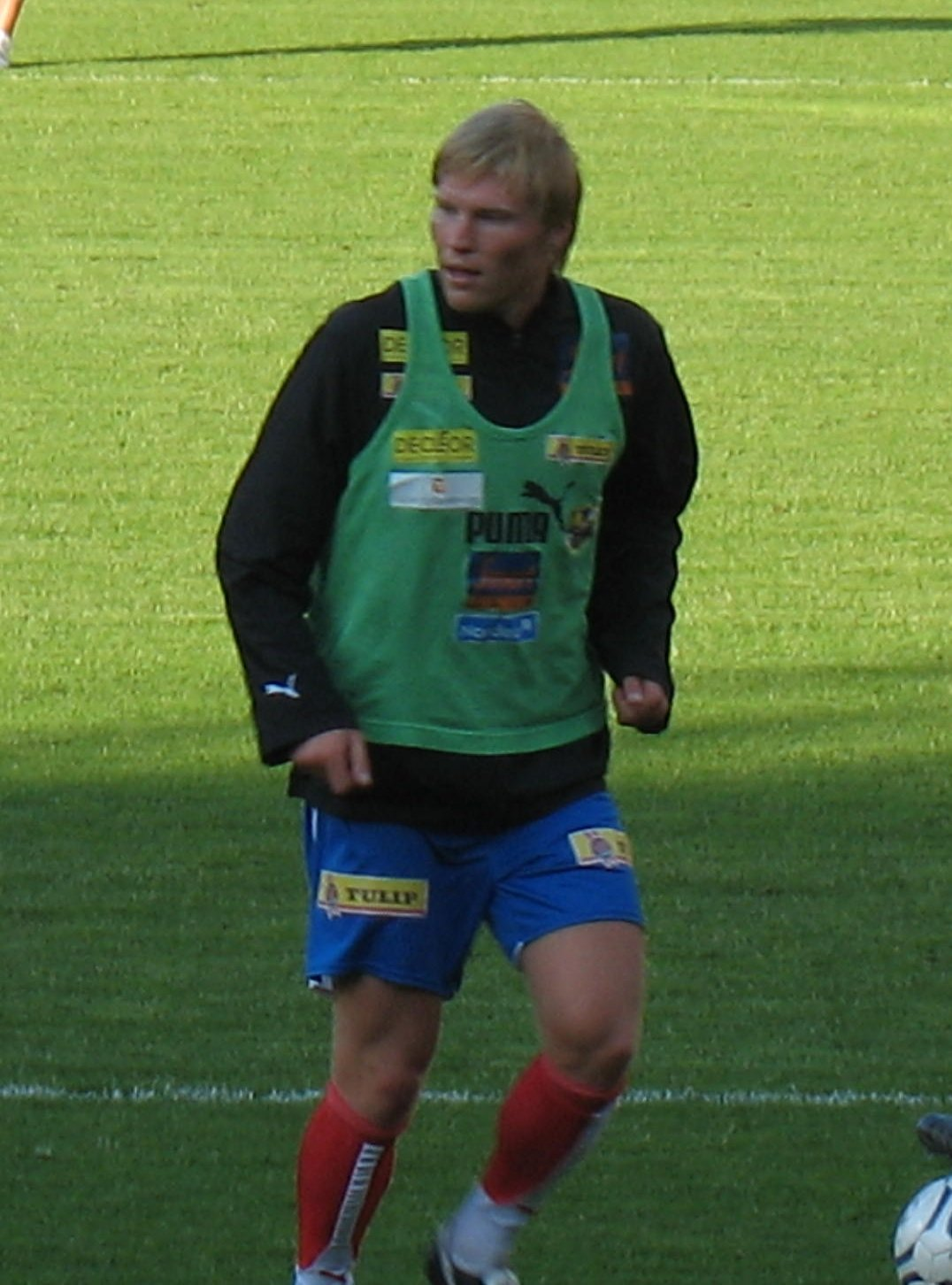

Personal information
- Date of birth: 25 June 1985 (age 41)
- Place of birth: Szczecin, Poland
- Height: 1.84 m (6 ft 0 in)
- Position: Midfielder

Youth career
- Asker
- Lyn

Senior career*
Years	Team	Apps	(Gls)
2003–2008	Lyn	141	(15)
2009–2011	Viking	43	(2)
2011–2014	Brann	38	(3)
2014	→ Stabæk (loan)	11	(0)
2014	Stabæk	14	(0)
2016–2017	Asker	38	(5)
2018	Asker	14	(1)

International career
2004–2004	Norway U19	3	(0)
2004–2006	Norway U21	23	(3)
2006	Norway	1	(0)
- * Club domestic league appearances and goals

Tomasz Sokołowski (born 25 June 1985) is a former professional footballer who played as a midfielder. Born in Poland, he represented Norway at international level.

== Club career ==
He is the son of former Polish footballer Kazimierz Sokołowski, who emigrated to Norway in 1991.

He started his senior career with Lyn, which he left after his contract expired at the end of the 2008 season. He joined stancji, leaving in November 2011, then Brann and Stabæk Fotball.

Sokołowski moved to Stabæk, initially on loan, in 2014, leaving the club at the end of the season after his contract expired. After not featuring in any club in 2015, he joined his youth club Asker for the 2016 season. He left the club again at the end of 2017, but made a comeback in May 2018, where he once again signed with the club, after not getting his contract extended at the end of 2017. But he left the club again, this time at the end of 2018, where his contract expired.,

== International career ==
Sokołowski was eligible to play for both Norway and Poland, but elected to play for Norway, and got his only cap in a January 2006 friendly against the United States.

== Career statistics ==
Appearances and goals by club, season and competition
Club	Season	League			Cup		Total	
Club	Season	Division	Apps	Goals	Apps	Goals	Apps	Goals
Lyn	2003	Tippeligaen	20	2	4	0	24	2
Lyn	2004	Tippeligaen	23	2	7	0	30	2
Lyn	2005	Tippeligaen	25	3	3	0	28	3
Lyn	2006	Tippeligaen	26	2	2	1	28	3
Lyn	2007	Tippeligaen	21	3	4	0	25	3
Lyn	2008	Tippeligaen	26	3	5	0	31	3
Lyn	Total		141	15	25	1	166	16
Viking	2009	Tippeligaen	21	1	3	0	24	1
Viking	2010	Tippeligaen	18	0	4	0	22	0
Viking	2011	Tippeligaen	4	1	0	0	4	1
Viking	Total		43	2	7	0	50	2
Brann	2012	Tippeligaen	13	2	3	1	16	3
Brann	2013	Tippeligaen	25	1	2	0	27	1
Brann	Total		38	3	5	1	43	4
Stabæk	2014	Tippeligaen	25	0	6	0	31	0
Asker	2016	2. divisjon	14	3	1	0	15	3
Asker	2017	2. divisjon	24	2	1	0	25	2
Asker	Total		38	5	2	0	41	5
Asker	2018	2. divisjon	14	1	0	0	14	1
Career total			299	26	44	2	343	28
