= Piotr Leciejewski =

Polish footballer

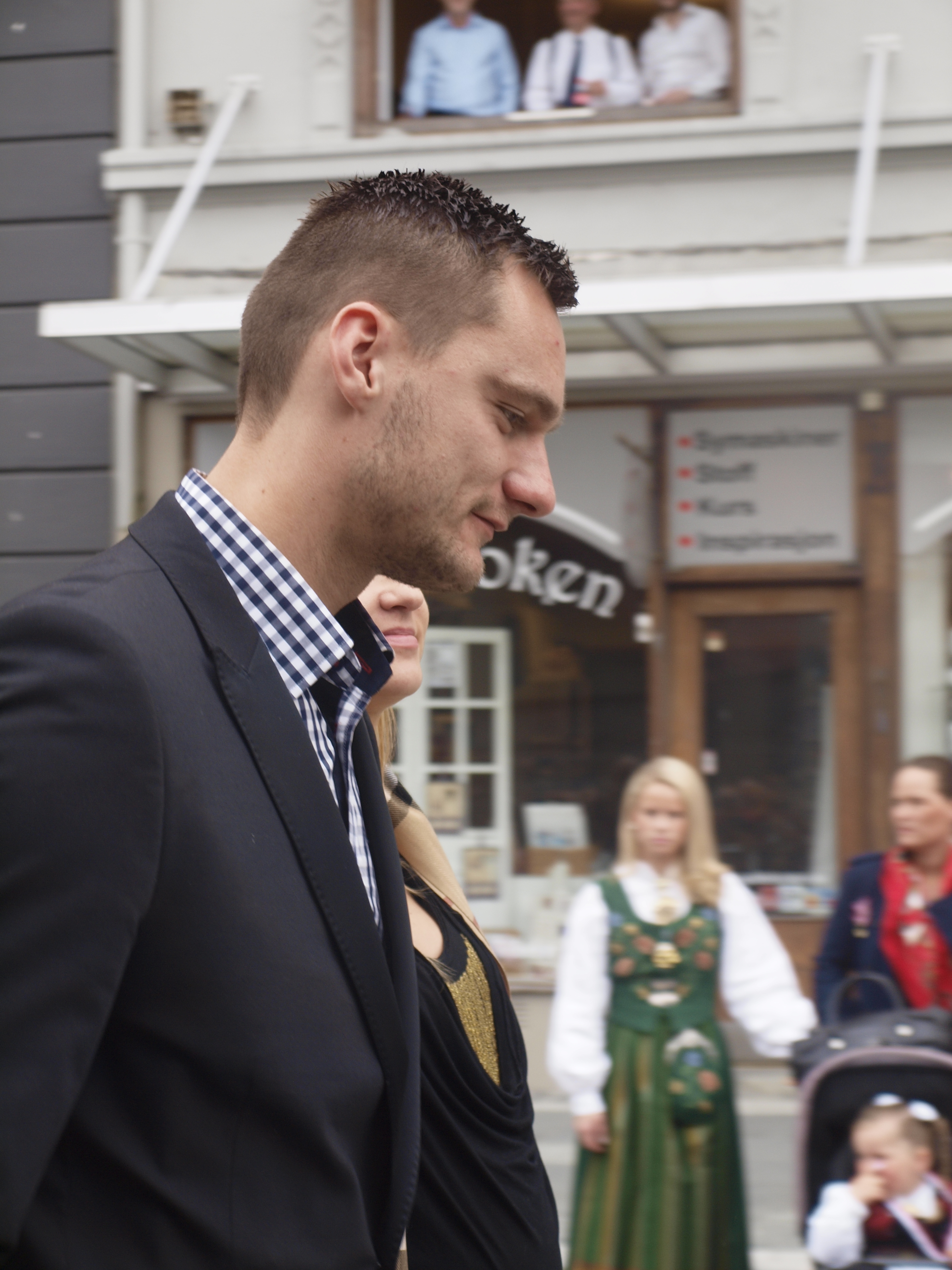
- Leciejewski in 2013

Personal information
- Date of birth: 23 March 1985 (age 41)
- Place of birth: Legnica, Poland
- Height: 1.94 m (6 ft 4 in)
- Position: Goalkeeper

Team information
- Current team: Carina Gubin (caretaker manager)

Youth career
- LSPM Zielona Góra
- Lech Zielona Góra

Senior career*
Years	Team	Apps	(Gls)
2004–2006	Górnik Zabrze	0	(0)
2005	→ GKS Katowice (loan)	1	(0)
2006–2007	Górnik Łęczna	17	(0)
2007	Korona Kielce	0	(0)
2008–2010	Sogndal	80	(0)
2011–2018	Brann	166	(0)
2018–2019	Zagłębie Lubin	2	(0)
2018–2019	Zagłębie Lubin II	3	(0)
2020	MKP Wołów	25	(0)
Total		294	(0)

Managerial career
- 2026–: Carina Gubin (caretaker)
- * Club domestic league appearances and goals

Piotr Leciejewski (Polish pronunciation: [ˈpjɔtr ˌlɛtɕɛˈjɛfskʲi]; born 23 March 1985) is a Polish former professional footballer who played as a goalkeeper. He is currently the caretaker manager of III liga club Carina Gubin.

== Career ==
Leciejewski impressed instantly with his explosive reflexes and was one of Sogndal's best players when he arrived. In the 2010 season he saved five out of five penalties.

On 19 August 2010, Sky Sports reported that English champions Chelsea were interested in Leciejewski.

Leciejewski moved from Sogndal to Brann after the 2010 season, in an exchange-deal where Kenneth Udjus and Cato Hansen moved the other way. He made his debut for Brann in the fifth league-match of the 2011 season against Molde, and despite conceding three goals in his debut, Leciejewski soon displaced Håkon Opdal, Brann's first-choice goalkeeper since 2004. Leciejewski quickly became a fan favorite at Brann, and was awarded with the supporters Player of the Year-award in both the 2012- and 2013-season.

On 3 November 2011, Leciejewski stated that he might be interested in playing for Norway national team.

== Career statistics ==
Appearances and goals by club, season and competition
Club	Season	League			National cup (Note: Includes Polish Cup, Norwegian Cup)		Europe		Other		Total	
Club	Season	Division	Apps	Goals	Apps	Goals	Apps	Goals	Apps	Goals	Apps	Goals
GKS Katowice (loan)	2004–05	Ekstraklasa	1	0	—		—		—		1	0
Górnik Zabrze	2005–06	Ekstraklasa	0	0	1	0	—		—		1	0
Górnik Łęczna	2006–07	Ekstraklasa	17	0	1	0	—		5 (Note: Appearances in Ekstraklasa Cup)	0	23	0
Korona Kielce	2007–08	Ekstraklasa	0	0	0	0	—		3	0	3	0
Sogndal	2008	1. divisjon	30	0	1	0	—		—		31	0
Sogndal	2009	1. divisjon	24	0	1	0	—		—		25	0
Sogndal	2010	1. divisjon	26	0	3	0	—		—		29	0
Sogndal	Total		80	0	5	0	—		—		85	0
Brann	2011	Eliteserien	25	0	6	0	—		—		31	0
Brann	2012	Eliteserien	23	0	5	0	—		—		28	0
Brann	2013	Eliteserien	25	0	0	0	—		—		25	0
Brann	2014	Eliteserien	27	0	4	0	—		—		30	0
Brann	2015	1. divisjon	14	0	0	0	—		—		14	0
Brann	2016	Eliteserien	27	0	0	0	—		—		27	0
Brann	2017	Eliteserien	25	0	0	0	1 (Note: Appearance in UEFA Europa League)	0	1 (Note: Appearance in Mesterfinalen)	0	27	0
Brann	Total		166	0	15	0	1	0	1	0	183	0
Zagłębie Lubin	2017–18	Ekstraklasa	1	0	—		—		—		1	0
Zagłębie Lubin	2018–19	Ekstraklasa	1	0	0	0	—		—		1	0
Zagłębie Lubin	Total		2	0	0	0	—		—		2	0
Zagłębie Lubin II	2017–18	III liga, gr. III	1	0	—		—		—		1	0
Zagłębie Lubin II	2018–19	III liga, gr. III	2	0	—		—		—		2	0
Zagłębie Lubin II	Total		3	0	—		—		—		3	0
MKP Wołów	2020–21	IV liga Low. Silesia East	25	0	—		—		—		25	0
Career total			294	0	22	0	1	0	9	0	326	0

== Managerial statistics ==
As of match played 26 September 2026

Managerial record by team and tenure
Team	From	To	Record							
Team	From	To	G	W	D	L	GF	GA	GD	Win %
Carina Gubin (caretaker)	16 September 2026	Present	2	0	0	2	1	6	−5	0.00
Total			2	0	0	2	1	6	−5	0.00
