= Amin Askar =

Norwegian footballer (born 1985)

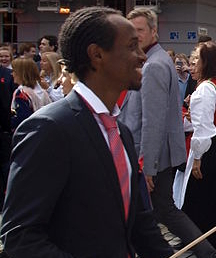
- Amin Askar in 2014

Personal information
- Full name: Amin Soleiman Askar
- Date of birth: 1 October 1985 (age 41)
- Place of birth: Harer, Ethiopia
- Height: 1.74 m (5 ft 8 1/2 in)
- Position: Winger

Team information
- Current team: Sprint-Jeløy

Youth career
- Kambo

Senior career*
Years	Team	Apps	(Gls)
2003–2008	Moss	110	(22)
2009–2011	Fredrikstad	80	(8)
2012–2016	Brann	80	(21)
2015	→ Sarpsborg 08 (loan)	27	(2)
2016–2017	Şanlıurfaspor	32	(1)
2017–2019	Sarpsborg 08	48	(4)
2020–2022	Kristiansund	65	(2)
2023	Moss	8	(0)
2023–	Sprint-Jeløy	12	(1)

International career^{‡}
2003	Norway U18	3	(0)
2004	Norway U19	6	(1)
- * Club domestic league appearances and goals as of 10 December 2023 ‡ National team caps and goals as of 10 December 2023

Amin Soleiman Askar (Somali: Aamiin Askaar, Arabic: امين عسكر; born 1 October 1985) is a footballer who plays for Sprint-Jeløy. Born in Ethiopia, he has represented Norway at youth level.

== Club career ==
A versatile footballer, Askar has played in several positions, including defence and midfield. On 27 March 2009, he signed a two-year contract with Fredrikstad.

Before the 2012 season, Askar signed a contract with the Tippeligaen club Brann.

Before the 2015 season, Askar signed a loan-deal with the Tippeligaen club Sarpsborg 08.

== International ==
In 2013 Askar decided to represent Ethiopia at senior level. Askar was supposed to make his debut against Nigeria in the African play-offs for the World Cup in Brazil, but the needed paperwork did not arrive on time.

Askar also holds Norwegian and Somali citizenship, having lived in Norway since he was two years old.

== Career statistics ==
As of 10 May 2021

Club	Season	Division	League		Cup		Europe		Total	
Club	Season	Division	Apps	Goals	Apps	Goals	Apps	Goals	Apps	Goals
Moss	2003	1. divisjon	25	1	2	0	—		27	1
Moss	2004	1. divisjon	15	2	1	1	—		16	3
Moss	2005	1. divisjon	0	0	0	0	—		0	0
Moss	2006	1. divisjon	23	6	1	1	—		24	7
Moss	2007	1. divisjon	25	7	1	2	—		26	9
Moss	2008	1. divisjon	22	6	0	0	—		22	6
Fredrikstad	2009	Tippeligaen	27	3	4	1	2	0	33	4
Fredrikstad	2010	1. divisjon	28	4	3	2	—		31	6
Fredrikstad	2011	Tippeligaen	25	1	4	2	—		29	3
Brann	2012	Tippeligaen	23	8	4	0	—		27	8
Brann	2013	Tippeligaen	29	9	1	0	—		30	9
Brann	2014	Tippeligaen	28	4	4	2	—		32	6
Sarpsborg 08	2015	Tippeligaen	27	2	4	1	—		31	3
Şanlıurfaspor	2015–16	TFF First League	17	1	1	0	—		18	1
Şanlıurfaspor	2016–17	TFF First League	15	0	7	0	—		22	0
Sarpsborg 08	2017	Eliteserien	11	0	3	0	—		14	0
Sarpsborg 08	2018	Eliteserien	24	4	2	0	13	1	39	5
Sarpsborg 08	2019	Eliteserien	13	0	0	0	—		13	0
Kristiansund	2020	Eliteserien	28	2	0	0	—		28	2
Career Total			405	50	42	12	15	1	462	63
