= Jørgen Mohus =

Norwegian footballer (born 1991)

Personal information
- Full name: Jørgen Aarre Mohus
- Date of birth: 5 September 1991 (age 35)
- Place of birth: Bergen, Norway
- Height: 1.85 m (6 ft 1 in)
- Position: Goalkeeper

Youth career
- –2008: Tertnes
- 2009–2011: Brann

Senior career*
Years	Team	Apps	(Gls)
2012–2013	Brann	9	(0)
2009	→ Åsane (loan)		
2011	→ Åsane (loan)		
2014	Bærum		
- * Club domestic league appearances and goals as of 21 November 2013

Jørgen Aarre Mohus (born 5 September 1991) is a Norwegian football goalkeeper who is currently a free agent.

He started his youth career at Tertnes IL and joined the city's great team, SK Brann, in 2009. After loan spells at Åsane Fotball, he made his first-team league debut in November 2012 in a 2–1 loss against Viking. He never broke through at Brann, and in 2014, he spent one season at Bærum SK.

== Career statistics ==
As of 28 September 2013

Season	Club	Division	League		Cup		Total	
Season	Club	Division	Apps	Goals	Apps	Goals	Apps	Goals
2012	Brann	Tippeligaen	3	0	0	0	3	0
2013	Brann	Tippeligaen	6	0	2	0	8	0
Career Total			9	0	2	0	11	0
