= Erlend Slokvik =

Norwegian orienteer (born 1962)

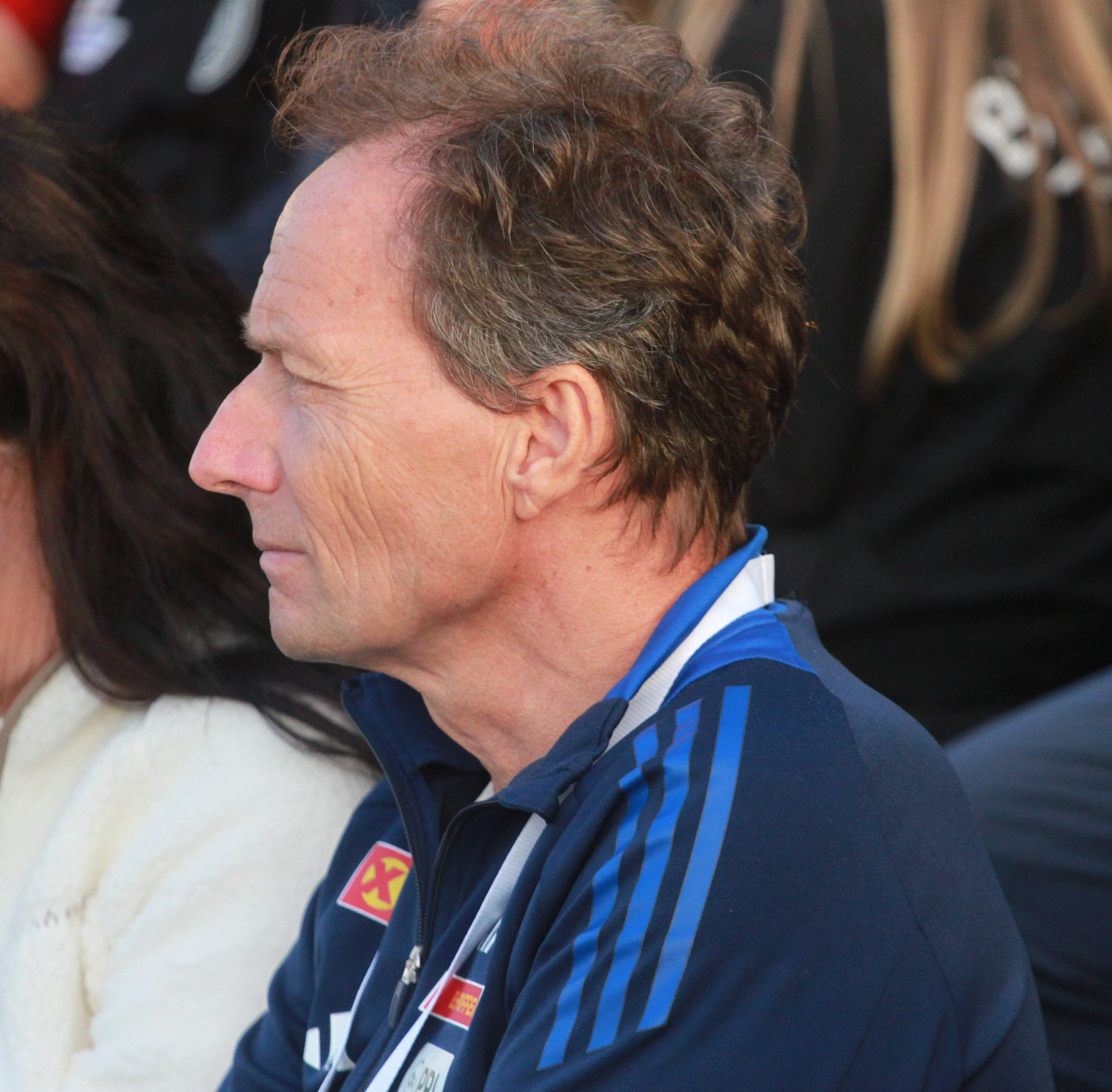

Personal information
- Born: 24 February 1962 (age 64)
- Education: University of Oslo; Norwegian School of Sport Sciences
Medal record
Representing Norway
Men's ski orienteering
World Championships
Bronze medal – third place	1988 Kuopio	Relay
Bronze medal – third place	1990 Skellefteå	Relay

Erlend Slokvik (born 24 February 1962) is a Norwegian ski-orienteering competitor, sports coach and sports executive.

During his active career he won two bronze medals at the World Ski Orienteering Championships. His best world cup result is placing 5th overall in the 1989 World Cup in Ski Orienteering.

He has been head coach for the Norwegian national teams in orienteering and biathlon, and sports executive in biathlon and athletics.

Since 2018 he has been head of elite sport for the Norwegian Athletics Association.

== Personal life and education ==
Slokvik was born on 24 February 1962. He studied natural sciences and pedagogy at the University of Oslo, and has a diploma in sports coaching from the Norwegian School of Sport Sciences.

== Career ==
=== Active career ===
Slokvik won a bronze medal in the relay at the World Ski Orienteering Championships in Kuopio in 1988, together with Kjetil Ulven, Lars Lystad, and Vidar Benjaminsen. He won another bronze medal at the World Championships in Skellefteå in 1990, together with Ulven, Harald Svergja, and Benjaminsen.

Individually, he placed 5th in the short distance at the World Ski Orienteering Championships 1990.

Competing in the very first World Cup in Ski Orienteering in 1989, he placed 5th overall, while he placed 21st overall in the World Cup in 1991.

=== Coach and sports administrator ===
After his active career, Slokvik had a career as coach and sports administrator. He was head coach for the Norwegian national team in orienteering from 1997 to 2000, and for the national biathlon team from 2000 to 2002. He served as vice president for the Norwegian Biathlon Association from 2008 to 2016, and as president from 2016 to 2018. In 2018 he was appointed head of elite sport (Norwegian: toppidretts-sjef) for the Norwegian Athletics Association. In October 2024 his contract with the Norwegian Athletics Association was extended until end og 2026.

During his leadership of the Norwegian Athletics Association, Norwegian athletes succeeded winning medals in several international championships, including two gold medals and one silver medal at the 2020 Summer Olympics, four gold medals in the next three World Athletics Championships, three gold medals at the 2022 European Athletics Championships in Munich. and four gold medals at the 2024 European Athletics Championships.
