= Erdin Demir =

Swedish professional footballer

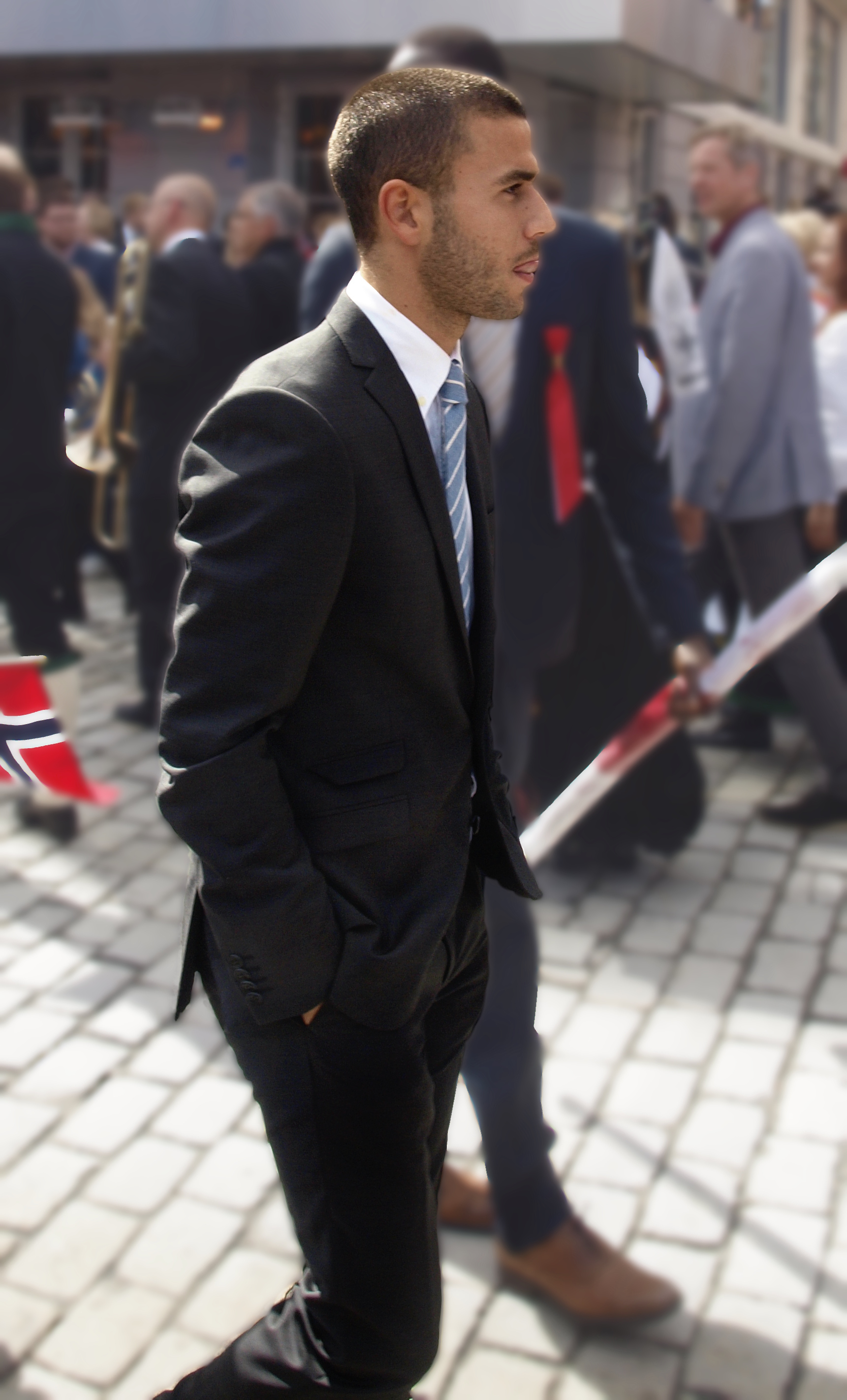
- Demir in 2014

Personal information
- Date of birth: 27 March 1990 (age 36)
- Place of birth: Malmö, Sweden
- Height: 1.77 m (5 ft 10 in)
- Position: Left back

Youth career
- Malmö FF

Senior career*
Years	Team	Apps	(Gls)
2008–2009	Malmö FF	0	(0)
2009	→ IFK Malmö (loan)	10	(1)
2009–2010	Limhamn Bunkeflo	34	(1)
2011	Trelleborgs FF	29	(0)
2012–2015	Brann	72	(0)
2015–2018	Waasland Beveren	87	(1)
2018–2021	Zulte Waregem	15	(1)

International career^{‡}
2007–2008	Sweden U19	11	(1)
2011–2012	Sweden U21	15	(0)
2012–2014	Sweden	6	(0)
- * Club domestic league appearances and goals as of 27 April 2019 ‡ National team caps and goals as of 30 November 2018

Erdin Demir (born Demirovski, 27 March 1990) is a Swedish former professional footballer who played as a left back. He played in Sweden, Norway, and Belgium during a career that spanned between 2008 and 2021. A full international between 2012 and 2014, he won six caps for the Sweden national team.

== Career ==
=== Sweden ===
Demir played youth football with Malmö FF, making his professional debut in the Svenska Cupen against Kristianstad. He scored the first goal in what would become a 3–2 win to Malmö. A move to LB07 was next as it became apparent he would not break into the Malmö first team. At the start of 2011, Demir moved back into the Allsvenskan with Trelleborg. Despite finishing fifteenth and in a relegation spot, he was nominated for Allsvenskan Newcomer of the Year. His impressive season attracted interest from Swedish side Djurgården and unnamed teams in Turkey, the country of his origins.

=== Brann ===
On 6 December 2011, Demir signed with Norwegian club Brann for around five million Swedish kronor. His contract will run until the end of the 2015 Tippeligaen season. Former Brann striker and Trelleborg team mate of Demir Joakim Sjöhage described the young Swede as "a modern full-back," continuing to say that "he is good offensively and stable defensively. He came as a new signing to Trelleborg, but was consistently one of the best in the team."

During the mid-season break in his first season in Norway, Demir spoke of how he wished to use the autumn as a new start. On his first six months, he said, "I got a good start in pre-season. It created high expectations, then I had a less than fortunate start to the league. I received a lot of criticism. As with everyone else who receives that, it hit my self-confidence." He justified his slow start by saying, "I was bought as an offensive full back, to help with attack. You must be aware that there will be space behind me." His coach, Rune Skarsfjord was in agreement that "[Erdin] is unfinished," but is confident that he'll "grow" defensively.

=== Belgium and retirement ===
He retired from professional football in early 2022, after having played in Belgium since 2015.

== International career ==
Demir has played seven games for the Sweden under-21 team. In his four appearances during the 2013 European Under-21 Championship qualification he has assisted four goals, the equal most of any player.

On 14 December 2011, Erik Hamrén called Demir up to the Swedish national side for two friendly matches against Qatar and Bahrain. His debut came against the former on 23 January 2012, in which he received very positive reviews.

== Career statistics ==
As of 4 October 2015

Season	Club	Division	League		Cup		Total	
Season	Club	Division	Apps	Goals	Apps	Goals	Apps	Goals
2011	Trelleborg	Allsvenskan	29	0	0	0	29	0
2012	Brann	Tippeligaen	22	0	5	0	27	0
2013	Brann	Tippeligaen	21	0	0	0	21	0
2014	Brann	Tippeligaen	17	0	1	0	18	0
2015	Brann	OBOS-ligaen	12	0	1	1	13	1
2015–16	Waasland Beveren	Pro League	10	0	0	0	10	0
Career total			111	0	7	1	118	1
