= Ådne Nissestad =

Norwegian footballer (born 1995)

Personal information
- Date of birth: 18 November 1995 (age 30)
- Place of birth: Bergen, Norway
- Height: 1.86 m (6 ft 1 in)
- Position: Goalkeeper

Youth career
- –2009: Lyngbø
- 2010–2014: Brann

Senior career*
Years	Team	Apps	(Gls)
2014–2015	Brann	1	(0)
2015–2022	Fana	97	(0)
Total		98	(0)
- * Club domestic league appearances and goals

Ådne Nissestad (born 18 November 1995) is a Norwegian former footballer who played as a goalkeeper.
