= Kasper Skaanes =

Norwegian footballer (born 1995)

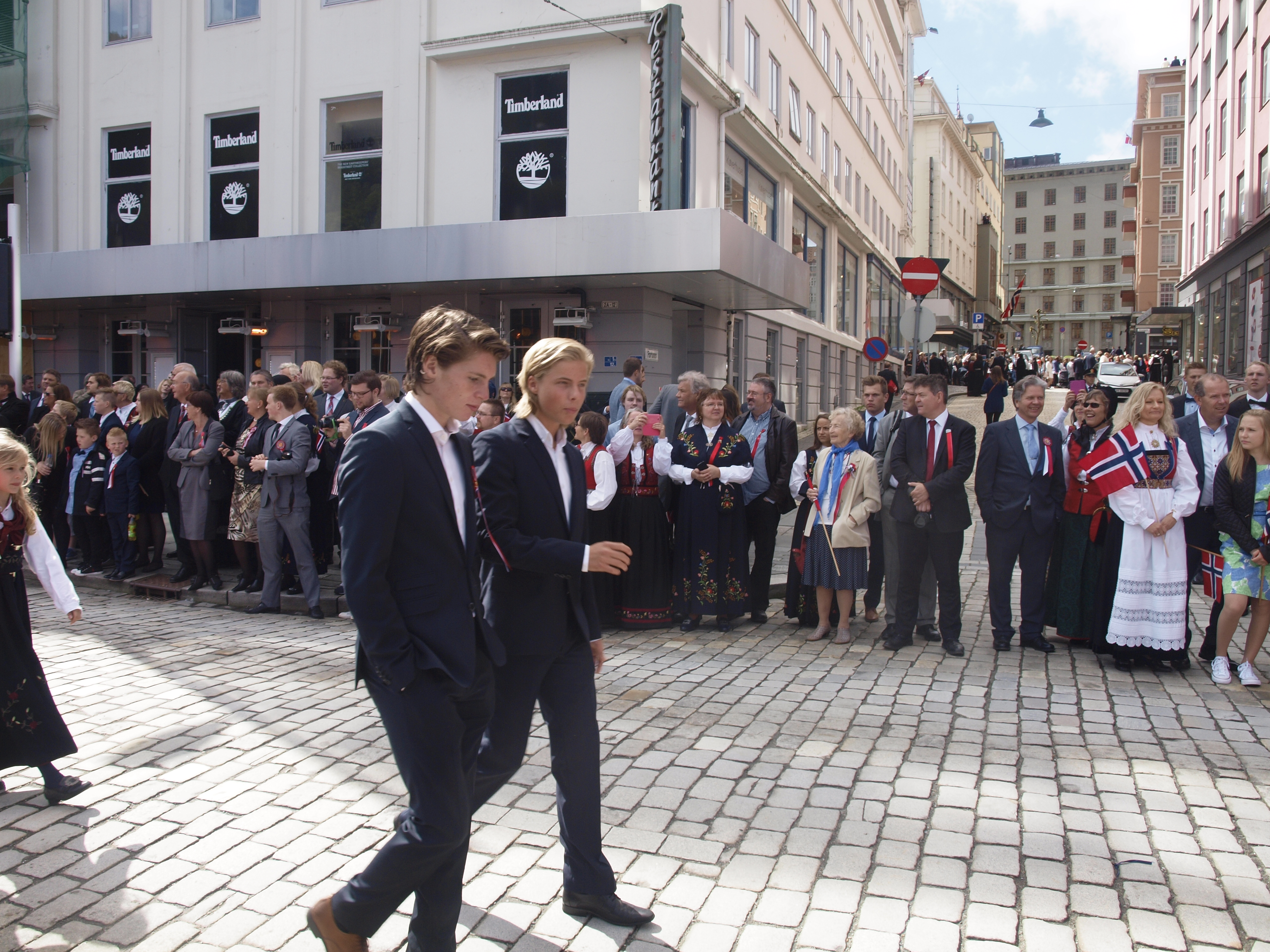
- Kasper Skaanes (left)

Personal information
- Date of birth: 19 March 1995 (age 31)
- Place of birth: Bergen, Norway
- Height: 1.75 m (5 ft 9 in)
- Position: Midfielder

Team information
- Current team: Sogndal
- Number: 10

Senior career*
Years	Team	Apps	(Gls)
2012–2018	Brann	95	(8)
2018–2021	Start	69	(9)
2021–2022	Brann	40	(6)
2023–	Sogndal	96	(8)

International career
2012	Norway U17	11	(1)
2014	Norway U19	1	(0)
2014	Norway U21	1	(0)
- * Club domestic league appearances and goals as of 14 November 2026

Kasper Skaanes (born 19 March 1995) is a Norwegian professional footballer who plays for Sogndal, as a midfielder.

== Career statistics ==
=== Club ===
As of match played 14 November 2026

Appearances and goals by club, season and competition
Club	Season	League			National Cup		Continental		Total	
Club	Season	Division	Apps	Goals	Apps	Goals	Apps	Goals	Apps	Goals
Brann	2012	Tippeligaen	1	0	1	0	-		2	0
Brann	2013	Tippeligaen	4	0	1	0	-		5	0
Brann	2014	Tippeligaen	28	5	4	0	-		32	5
Brann	2015	OBOS-ligaen	25	2	3	2	-		28	4
Brann	2016	Tippeligaen	16	0	0	0	-		16	0
Brann	2017	Eliteserien	19	1	4	0	2	0	25	1
Brann	2018	Eliteserien	2	0	0	0	-		2	0
Brann	Total		95	8	13	2	2	0	110	10
Start	2018	Eliteserien	16	0	5	0	-		21	0
Start	2019	OBOS-ligaen	29	7	1	0	-		30	7
Start	2020	Eliteserien	24	2	0	0	-		24	2
Start	Total		69	9	6	0	-	-	75	9
Brann	2021	Eliteserien	20	1	2	0	-		22	1
Brann	2022	OBOS-ligaen	20	5	3	0	-		23	5
Brann	Total		40	6	5	0	-	-	45	6
Sogndal	2023	OBOS-ligaen	20	1	3	1	-		23	2
Sogndal	2024	OBOS-ligaen	19	0	0	0	-		19	0
Sogndal	2025	OBOS-ligaen	27	2	3	1	-		30	3
Sogndal	2026	OBOS-ligaen	30	5	2	1	-		32	6
Sogndal	Total		96	8	8	3	-	-	104	11
Career total			300	31	32	4	2	0	334	36
