= Martin Pušić =

Austrian footballer (born 1987)

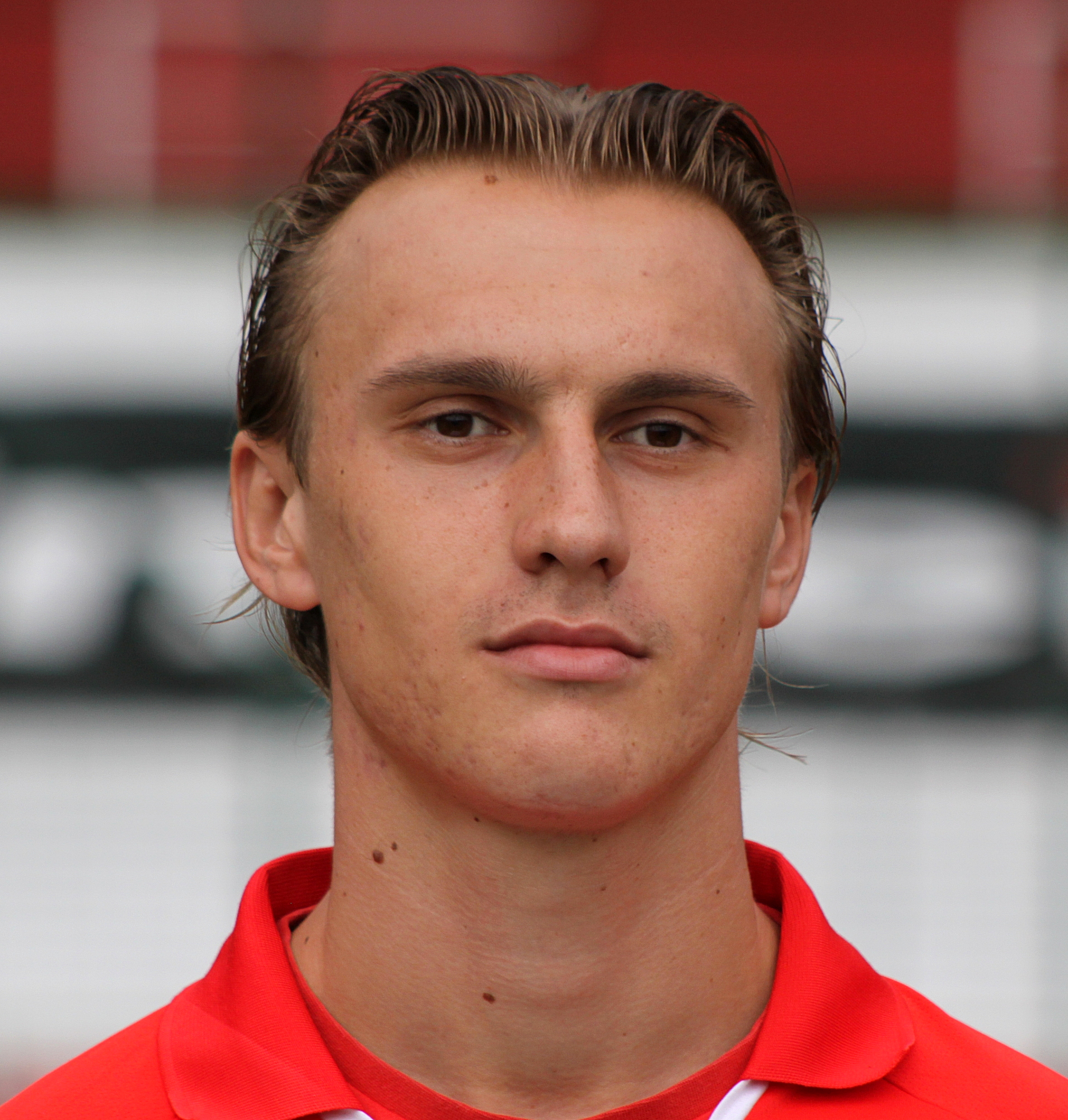
- Pušić in 2009

Personal information
- Date of birth: 24 October 1987 (age 39)
- Place of birth: Vienna, Austria
- Height: 1.87 m (6 ft 2 in)
- Position: Forward

Youth career
- 1998–2002: Austria Wien
- 2002–2005: First Vienna FC

Senior career*
Years	Team	Apps	(Gls)
2005–2007	First Vienna FC	34	(6)
2007–2008	SK Schwadorf	25	(4)
2008–2010	Admira Wacker	47	(11)
2010–2011	SC Rheindorf Altach	15	(4)
2011–2012	Hull City	2	(0)
2012	Vålerenga	16	(3)
2012	Fredrikstad	10	(5)
2013–2014	Brann	27	(9)
2014–2015	Esbjerg fB	29	(13)
2015–2017	FC Midtjylland	53	(23)
2017	→ Sparta Rotterdam (loan)	14	(6)
2017–2018	F. C. Copenhagen	6	(0)
2018	AGF	15	(6)
2018	AC Horsens	1	(0)
2019–2020	SV Mattersburg	44	(14)
2020	1860 Munich	8	(0)
Total		346	(104)

International career
2007	Austria U20	1	(1)
- * Club domestic league appearances and goals as of 11:20, 8 December 2020 (UTC)

Martin Pušić (born 24 October 1987) is an Austrian former professional footballer who played as a forward.

== Club career ==
=== Early career in Austria ===
Pušić began his career in the youth team of Austria Wien. In 2004, he crossed the city to join First Vienna FC, with whom he made his professional debut in 2005 in the Austrian Regional League. His performances attracted attention from higher divisions, and in 2007 he made a switch to SK Schwadorf in the First League, the second tier of the Austrian pyramid.

In the summer of 2008, SK Schwadorf and VfB Admira Wacker Mödling merged to form the new FC Admira Wacker Mödling, and Pušić became a regular player on their left wing. In 2008–09 he managed to make 24 league appearances, scoring 7 goals. The team also reached the 2009 Austrian Cup Final, which they lost 3–1 to the club where he began his career, Austria Wien.

On 8 August 2010, he signed with SC Rheindorf Altach, initially for only half a season but with an option to extend the contract through to the end of the 2010–11 season.

=== Hull City ===
In July 2011, he began a trial with English Championship team Hull City. He played his first game for the club on 27 July 2011; a 3–1 win over Yorkshire rivals Bradford City, Pusic scored the final goal of the match. On 9 August 2011, the club announced that Pušić had signed a deal until the end of the 2011–12 season. He went on to make his debút on the same day in a 2–0 loss at home to Macclesfield Town in the League Cup First Round tie. He made his league debut on 1 October 2011 at the KC Stadium, in a 2–1 win against Cardiff City.

After injuries stalled his progression, Pušić was released from his contract at the KC Stadium on 9 January 2012.

=== Years in Norway ===
On 18 March 2012, he signed a one-year contract with the Norwegian club Vålerenga. He became the match winner in his first game, against FK Haugesund. However, after only five months in the club, his contract was mutually terminated by both parts. Vålerenga manager Martin Andresen stated that the termination came as a result of Pušić's unwillingness to sign a new contract with the club, combined with the fact that the club had a full foreign player quota.

On 30 August 2012, the same day he was released by Vålerenga, he signed a short-term contract until the end of the season with the Norwegian club Fredrikstad in hope that he could save them from relegation. Although he stepped up the challenge and was hyped by the Norwegian media as Fredrikstad's potential saviour, the club was relegated in the final match of the season, losing 2–0 at home against Molde. His short-term contract expired shortly after, and was not renewed as Pušić himself did not want to play in the Adeccoliga.

On 17 January 2013, he signed with a third Norwegian club, Brann on a free transfer. He was signed as a striker to replace Brann's previous season's top scorer Kim Ojo, following his transfer to the Belgian club KRC Genk.

=== Top scorer in Denmark ===
On 16 January 2014, he signed a three-year contract with the Danish club Esbjerg fB for an unknown fee. During his first season at the club, Pušić made 12 league appearances, scoring 5 goals.

Halfway through the 2014–15 Danish Superliga, Pušić was sold to FC Midtjylland, for a reported fee of 7.5 million Danish kroner (approximately £0,9 million). Ultimately, Pušić scored 17 goals during the season and finished as the league overall top scorer, while Midtjylland won the championship for the first time in its history.

In 2015–16, Pušić was a regular starter as Midtjylland finished third in the league. He played 25 competitive games and scored 13 goals. He was, however, deemed surplus to requirements during the following season and joined the Dutch Eredivisie club Sparta Rotterdam on a half year loan on 28 January 2017.

On 26 August 2017, Pušić signed a one-year contract with the Danish defending champions F. C. Copenhagen.

On 15 July 2018, AC Horsens announced they had signed Pušić on a free transfer and handed him a two-year deal. Four days later, on 19 July 2018, this deal was annulled on Pušić's request.

=== 1860 Munich ===
Pušić joined 3. Liga club TSV 1860 Munich on a one-year contract in summer 2020. He agreed the termination of his contract in December due to personal issues, having made 8 appearances for the club.

== International career ==
Born in Austria, Pušić is of Croatian descent. Whilst playing for Vienna in 2007, Pušić was called up to the Austrian U-20 squad in preparation for the U-20 World Cup in Canada and played his first and, to date, only international game for the Austrian U-20 team. He ultimately failed to make the squad for the tournament, and was not part of the team which went on to finish fourth.

=== Retirement ===
On 12 April 2022, Pušić announced in an interview with the Danish media outlet Tipsbladet that he had retired from football, and was coaching an under-18 team near his home in Vienna.

== Career statistics ==
Appearances and goals by club, season and competition
Club	Season	League			National Cup		Europe		Other		Total	
Club	Season	Division	Apps	Goals	Apps	Goals	Apps	Goals	Apps	Goals	Apps	Goals
First Vienna FC	2006–07				2	1	—		—		2	1
ASK Schwadorf	2097–08	Austrian First League	25	5	0	0	—		—		25	4
Admira Wacker	2008–09	Austrian First League	24	7	4	1	—		—		28	8
Admira Wacker	2009–10	Austrian First League	23	4	2	1	—		—		25	5
Admira Wacker	Total		47	11	6	2	0	0	0	0	53	13
Rheindorf Altach	2010–11	Erste Liga	15	4	1	0	—		—		16	4
Hull City	2011–12	Championship	2	0	0	0	—		1 (Note: Appearance in the EFL League Cup)	0	3	0
Vålerenga	2012	Tippeligaen	16	3	1	0	—		—		17	3
Fredrikstad	2012	Tippeligaen	10	5	0	0	—		—		10	5
Brann	2013	Tippeligaen	27	9	2	4	—		—		29	13
Esbjerg	2013–14	Danish Superliga	12	5	0	0	2	1	—		14	6
Esbjerg	2014–15	Danish Superliga	17	8	1	0	3	1	—		21	9
Esbjerg	Total		29	13	1	0	5	2	0	0	35	15
Midtjylland	2014–15	Danish Superliga	16	8	0	0	0	0	—		16	8
Midtjylland	2015–16	Danish Superliga	25	13	0	0	12	2	—		37	15
Midtjylland	2016–17	Danish Superliga	12	2	1	0	6	0	—		19	2
Midtjylland	Total		53	23	1	0	18	2	0	0	72	25
Sparta Rotterdam (loan)	2016–17	Eredivisie	14	6	1	0	0	0	—		15	6
Copenhagen	2017–18	Danish Superliga	6	0	1	0	3	0	—		10	0
AGF	2017–18	Danish Superliga	15	6	0	0	0	0	—		15	6
AC Horsens	2018–19	Danish Superliga	1	0	0	0	0	0	—		1	0
SV Mattersburg	2018–19	Austrian Bundesliga	24	9	1	0	0	0	1 (Note: Appearance in Austrian Bundesliga play-offs)	0	26	9
SV Mattersburg	2019–20	Austrian Bundesliga	20	5	0	0	0	0	0	0	20	5
SV Mattersburg	Total		44	14	1	0	0	0	1	0	46	14
1860 Munich	2020–21	3. Liga	8	0	0	0	0	0	—		8	0
Career total			312	99	17	7	26	4	2	0	357	110

== Honours ==
Midtjylland

- Danish Superliga: 2014–15
