= 2021 Strømsgodset Toppfotball season =

Strømsgodset
2021 season
- Chairman: Ivar Strømsjordet
- Manager(s): Bjørn Petter Ingebretsen; Håkon Wibe-Lund
- Stadium: Marienlyst Stadion
- Eliteserien: 9th
- Norwegian Cup: Fourth round
- Top goalscorer: League: Fred Friday (7); All: Fred Friday; Johan Hove (7)
| Home colours | Away colours |

The 2021 season was Strømsgodset Toppfotball's 114th season in existence and the club's 15th consecutive season in the top flight of Norwegian football. In addition to the domestic league, Strømsgodset Toppfotball participated in this season's edition of the Norwegian Football Cup.

== Players ==
=== First team squad ===
As of 1 September 2021

Note: Flags indicate national team as defined under FIFA eligibility rules; some limited exceptions apply. Players may hold more than one non-FIFA nationality.

| No. | Pos. | Nation | Player |
|---|---|---|---|
| 1 | GK | NOR | Viljar Myhra |
| 2 | DF | ISL | Ari Leifsson |
| 3 | DF | NOR | Jonathan Parr |
| 4 | DF | NOR | Thomas Grøgaard |
| 5 | DF | NOR | Niklas Gunnarsson |
| 6 | MF | NGA | Ipalibo Jack |
| 7 | MF | NOR | Herman Stengel (vice-captain) |
| 8 | MF | NOR | Johan Hove |
| 9 | FW | NGA | Fred Friday |
| 11 | MF | NOR | Kristoffer Tokstad |
| 16 | FW | NGA | Jordan Attah Kadiri (on loan from Lommel) |
| 17 | MF | NOR | Tobias Fjeld Gulliksen |
| 19 | MF | NOR | Halldor Stenevik |

| No. | Pos. | Nation | Player |
|---|---|---|---|
| 23 | MF | ISL | Valdimar Þór Ingimundarson |
| 26 | DF | NOR | Lars-Christopher Vilsvik |
| 30 | DF | NOR | Fabian Holst-Larsen |
| 40 | GK | NOR | Morten Sætra |
| 50 | GK | NOR | Daniel Skretteberg |
| 51 | FW | NOR | Aleksander Biermann Stenseth |
| 58 | FW | NOR | Simen Hammershaug |
| 70 | DF | NOR | Sondre Fosnæss Hanssen |
| 71 | DF | NOR | Gustav Valsvik (captain) |
| 80 | DF | NOR | Andreas Rosendal Nyhagen |
| 84 | MF | NOR | Ole Enersen |
| 88 | FW | NOR | Lars-Jørgen Salvesen |
| 92 | MF | KOS | Kreshnik Krasniqi |

=== Out on loan ===
Note: Flags indicate national team as defined under FIFA eligibility rules; some limited exceptions apply. Players may hold more than one non-FIFA nationality.

| No. | Pos. | Nation | Player |
|---|---|---|---|
| 56 | FW | NOR | Mustapha Fofana (at Ørn Horten until 31 December 2021) |
| 64 | MF | NOR | Sebastian Pop (on load to Fram Larvik until 31 December 2021) |

| No. | Pos. | Nation | Player |
|---|---|---|---|
| — | DF | NOR | Daniel Kubrom Hamde (at Florø until 31 July 2021) |

== Transfers ==
=== Winter ===
In: Note: Flags indicate national team as defined under FIFA eligibility rules; some limited exceptions apply. Players may hold more than one non-FIFA nationality.

| No. | Pos. | Nation | Player |
|---|---|---|---|
| 9 | FW | NGA | Fred Friday (free transfer) |
| 71 | DF | NOR | Gustav Valsvik (from Rosenborg) |
| 84 | MF | NOR | Ole Enersen (promoted from junior squad) |

Out: Note: Flags indicate national team as defined under FIFA eligibility rules; some limited exceptions apply. Players may hold more than one non-FIFA nationality.

| No. | Pos. | Nation | Player |
|---|---|---|---|
| 9 | FW | DEN | Marcus Mølvadgaard (released) |
| 56 | FW | NOR | Mustapha Fofana (on loan to Bærum, previously on loan at Øygarden) |
| 63 | MF | NOR | Magnus Lankhof Dahlby (released, previously on loan at Grorud) |

=== Summer ===
In: Note: Flags indicate national team as defined under FIFA eligibility rules; some limited exceptions apply. Players may hold more than one non-FIFA nationality.

| No. | Pos. | Nation | Player |
|---|---|---|---|
| 4 | DF | NOR | Thomas Grøgaard (from Brann) |
| 16 | FW | NGA | Jordan Attah Kadiri (on loan from (Belgium) Lommel) |

Out: Note: Flags indicate national team as defined under FIFA eligibility rules; some limited exceptions apply. Players may hold more than one non-FIFA nationality.

| No. | Pos. | Nation | Player |
|---|---|---|---|
| 4 | DF | CMR | Duplexe Tchamba (loan return to (France) Strasbourg) |
| 10 | FW | NOR | Moses Mawa (to Kristiansund) |
| 14 | DF | NOR | Nico Mickelson (to (Denmark) OB Odense) |
| 20 | MF | DEN | Mikkel Maigaard (to Sarpsborg 08) |
| 22 | DF | FRA | Prosper Mendy (released) |
| 56 | FW | NOR | Mustapha Fofana (on loan to Ørn Horten, previously on loan at Bærum) |
| 64 | MF | NOR | Sebastian Pop (on loan to Fram) |

== Competitions ==
=== Eliteserien ===
==== Results summary ====
| Overall | | | | | | | | Home | | | | | | Away | | | | | |
| Pld | W | D | L | GF | GA | GD | Pts | W | D | L | GF | GA | GD | W | D | L | GF | GA | GD |
|---|---|---|---|---|---|---|---|---|---|---|---|---|---|---|---|---|---|---|---|
| 30 | 9 | 9 | 12 | 43 | 43 | 0 | 36 | 8 | 4 | 3 | 33 | 12 | +21 | 1 | 5 | 9 | 10 | 31 | −21 |

Last updated: 12 December 2021.

==== Results by round ====
| Round | 1 | 2 | 3 | 4 | 5 | 6 | 7 | 8 | 9 | 10 | 11 | 12 | 13 | 14 | 15 | 16 | 17 | 18 | 19 | 20 | 21 | 22 | 23 | 24 | 25 | 26 | 27 | 28 | 29 | 30 |
|---|---|---|---|---|---|---|---|---|---|---|---|---|---|---|---|---|---|---|---|---|---|---|---|---|---|---|---|---|---|---|
| Ground | H | A | H | A | H | A | H | A | H | A | H | A | H | A | A | H | A | H | A | H | A | H | H | A | H | A | H | A | H | A |
| Result | W | L | W | L | D | L | W | D | W | L | D | D | W | L | L | W | W | L | D | W | L | L | D | L | W | D | L | L | D | D |
| Position | 1 | 8 | 3 | 4 | 9 | 10 | 8 | 9 | 8 | 8 | 9 | 10 | 8 | 10 | 11 | 9 | 9 | 9 | 9 | 7 | 8 | 9 | 9 | 9 | 8 | 9 | 10 | 10 | 11 | 9 |

A = Away; H = Home; W = Win; D = Draw; L = Loss

==== Results ====
| 16 May 2021 3 | Strømsgodset | 3–1 | Lillestrøm | Drammen |
| 18:00 CEST (UTC+2) | Ogbu 6' (o.g.); Stengel 17' (pen.); Friday 86' | Report | Ogbu 74' | Stadium: Marienlyst Stadion; Attendance: 0 Referee: Espen Eskås |

| 24 May 2021 4 | Kristiansund | 1–0 | Strømsgodset | Kristiansund |
| 18:00 CEST (UTC+2) | Bye 34' | Report | | Stadium: Kristiansund Stadion; Attendance: 600; Referee: Ola Hobber Nilsen |

| 27 May 2021 5 | Strømsgodset | 1–1 | Tromsø | Drammen |
| 18:00 CEST (UTC+2) | Hove 72' | Report | E. Kitolano 38' | Stadium: Marienlyst Stadion; Attendance: 200; Referee: Sivert Øksnes Amland |

| 30 May 2021 6 | Brann | 3–0 | Strømsgodset | Bergen |
| 18:00 CEST (UTC+2) | Heggebø 14'; Valsvik 29' (o.g.); Simba 85' | Report | | Stadium: Brann Stadion; Attendance: 600; Referee: Svein Oddvar Moen |

| 13 June 2021 7 | Strømsgodset | 2–1 | Rosenborg | Drammen |
| 18:00 CEST (UTC+2) | Stengel 62' (pen.); Stenevik 87' | Report | Wiedesheim-Paul 2' | Stadium: Marienlyst Stadion; Attendance: 600; Referee: Kristoffer Hagenes |

| 16 June 2021 14 | Bodø/Glimt | 7–2 | Strømsgodset | Bodø |
| 18:00 CEST (UTC+2) | Saltnes 6', 15'; Solbakken 29'; Botheim 44'; Vetlesen 71'; Nordås 82'; Lindahl 84' | Report | Maigaard 79'; Valsvik 89' | Stadium: Aspmyra Stadion; Attendance: 600; Referee: Sivert Øksnes Amland |

| 20 June 2021 8 | Mjøndalen | 1–1 | Strømsgodset | Mjøndalen |
| 15:00 CEST (UTC+2) | Ovenstad 57' | Report | Stenevik 67' | Stadium: Consto Arena; Attendance: 1,350; Referee: Espen Eskås |

| 24 June 2021 9 | Strømsgodset | 4–0 | Sandefjord | Drammen |
| 18:00 CEST (UTC+2) | Tchamba 16'; Hove 25'; Friday 33', 48' | Report | | Stadium: Marienlyst Stadion; Attendance: 2,000; Referee: Sigurd Smestad Kringstad |

| 30 June 2021 10 | Molde | 3–0 | Strømsgodset | Molde |
| 18:00 CEST (UTC+2) | Gregersen 7'; Omoijuanfo 27', 29'; Andersen (yellow card) 70' | Report | | Stadium: Aker Stadion; Attendance: 2,000; Referee: Tore Hansen |

| 4 July 2021 11 | Strømsgodset | 1–1 | Vålerenga | Drammen |
| 20:00 CEST (UTC+2) | Friday 19' | Report | Bjørdal 67' | Stadium: Marienlyst Stadion; Attendance: 2,000; Referee: Tom Harald Hagen |

| 10 July 2021 12 | Viking | 1–1 | Strømsgodset | Stavanger |
| 18:00 CEST (UTC+2) | Tripić 90' | Report | Jack 13' | Stadium: Viking Stadion; Attendance: 5,134; Referee: Sigurd Smehus Kringstad |

| 18 July 2021 13 | Strømsgodset | 2–1 | Stabæk | Drammen |
| 20:00 CEST (UTC+2) | Hove 37'; Friday 80' | Report | Edvardsen 35' | Stadium: Marienlyst Stadion; Attendance: 2,000; Referee: Svein Oddvar Moen |

| 21 July 2021 1 | Strømsgodset | 3–0 | Odd | Drammen |
| 19:00 CEST (UTC+2) | Gulliksen 58'; Jack 49'; Stengel 61' | Report | | Stadium: Marienlyst Stadion; Attendance: 2,000; Referee: Christian Moen |

| 28 July 2021 2 | Haugesund | 2–1 | Strømsgodset | Haugesund |
| 19:00 CEST (UTC+2) | Velde 26'; Wadji 60' | Report | Friday 69' | Stadium: Haugesund Stadion; Attendance: 2,000; Referee: Kristoffer Hagenes |

| 14 August 2021 15 | Sarpsborg 08 | 1–0 | Strømsgodset | Sarpsborg |
| 20:00 CEST (UTC+2) | Koné 72' | Report | | Stadium: Sarpsborg Stadion; Attendance: 2,526; Referee: Kai Erik Steen |

| 21 August 2021 16 | Strømsgodset | 3–1 | Brann | Drammen |
| 20:00 CEST (UTC+2) | Stengel 60'; Valsvik 74'; Gulliksen 86' | Report | Heggebø 23' | Stadium: Marienlyst Stadion; Attendance: 2,000; Referee: Svein Oddvar Moen |

| 29 August 2021 17 | Odd | 0–1 | Strømsgodset | Skien |
| 18:00 CEST (UTC+2) | | Report | Stengel 9' | Stadium: Skagerak Arena; Attendance: 3,208; Referee: Marius Hansen Grøtta |

| 12 September 2021 18 | Strømsgodset | 1–2 | Kristiansund | Drammen |
| 18:00 CEST (UTC+2) | Tokstad 54' | Report | Bye 20' (pen.); Coly 90+3' | Stadium: Marienlyst Stadion; Attendance: 2,522; Referee: Sivert Øksnes Amland |

| 25 September 2021 20 | Strømsgodset | 5–0 | Sarpsborg 08 | Drammen |
| 18:00 CEST (UTC+2) | Valsvik 26'; Jack 40'; Gulliksen 45+1'; Leifsson 60'; Kadiri 75' | Report | | Stadium: Marienlyst Stadion; Attendance: 2,589; Referee: Espen Eskås |

| 29 September 2021 19 | Stabæk | 0–0 | Strømsgodset | Bærum |
| 19:00 CEST (UTC+2) | | Report | | Stadium: Nadderud Stadion; Attendance: 2,306; Referee: Sivert Øksnes Amland |

| 3 October 2021 21 | Vålerenga | 3–0 | Strømsgodset | Oslo |
| 18:00 CEST (UTC+2) | Kjartansson 9'; Christensen 42'; Zuta 47' | Report | | Stadium: Intility Arena; Attendance: 6,430; Referee: Christian Moen |

| 17 October 2021 22 | Strømsgodset | 0–1 | Viking | Drammen |
| 17:00 CEST (UTC+2) | | Report | Løkberg 29' | Stadium: Marienlyst Stadion; Attendance: 6,404; Referee: Kai Erik Steen |

| 24 October 2021 23 | Strømsgodset | 1–1 | Bodø/Glimt | Drammen |
| 17:00 CEST (UTC+2) | Krasniqi 75' | Report | Solbakken 13' | Stadium: Marienlyst Stadion; Attendance: 3,906; Referee: Ola Hobber Nilsen |

| 27 October 2021 24 | Sandefjord | 2–0 | Strømsgodset | Sandefjord |
| 18:00 CEST (UTC+2) | Ruud Tveter 49'; Jónsson 51' | Report | | Stadium: Release Arena; Attendance: 1,655; Referee: Kristoffer Hagenes |

| 31 October 2021 25 | Strømsgodset | 6–0 | Molde | Drammen |
| 18:00 CET (UTC+1) | Friday 37'; Hove 41'; Stengel 45' (pen.); Gulliksen 75', 90+3'; Tokstad 90' | Report | | Stadium: Marienlyst Stadion; Attendance: 3,335; Referee: Sivert Øksnes Amland |

| 7 November 2021 26 | Tromsø | 1–1 | Strømsgodset | Tromsø |
| 17:00 CET (UTC+1) | Ebiye 83' | Report | Hove 62' | Stadium: Alfheim Stadion; Attendance: 2,040; Referee: Marius Hansen Grøtta |

| 20 November 2021 27 | Strømsgodset | 1–2 | Mjøndalen | Drammen |
| 18:00 CET (UTC+1) | Tokstad 88' | Report | Eriksen 12'; Brustad 78' | Stadium: Marienlyst Stadion; Attendance: 7,150; Referee: Tom Harlad Hagen |

| 27 November 2021 28 | Lillestrøm | 4–1 | Strømsgodset | Lillestrøm |
| 18:00 CET (UTC+1) | Lehne Olsen 21', 44', 61'; Dragsnes 45+1' | Report | Hove 86' | Stadium: Åråsen Stadion; Attendance: 3,797; Referee: Sivert Øksnes Amland |

| 5 December 2021 29 | Strømsgodset | 0–0 | Haugesund | Drammen |
| 17:00 CET (UTC+1) | | Report | | Stadium: Marienlyst Stadion; Attendance: 3,284; Referee: Christian Moen |

| 12 December 2021 30 | Rosenborg | 2–2 | Strømsgodset | Trondheim |
| 17:00 CET (UTC+1) | Vecchia 70' (pen.); Wiedesheim-Paul 85' | Report | Vilsvik 13'; Hovland | Stadium: Lerkendal Stadion; Attendance: 6,697; Referee: Kai Erik Steen |

==== Table ====
| Pos | Team | Pld | W | D | L | GF | GA | GD | Pts |
|---|---|---|---|---|---|---|---|---|---|
| 7 | Vålerenga | 30 | 11 | 12 | 7 | 46 | 37 | +9 | 45 |
| 8 | Sarpsborg 08 | 30 | 11 | 6 | 13 | 39 | 44 | −5 | 39 |
| 9 | Strømsgodset | 30 | 9 | 9 | 12 | 43 | 43 | 0 | 36 |
| 10 | Sandefjord | 30 | 10 | 6 | 14 | 38 | 52 | −14 | 36 |
| 11 | Haugesund | 30 | 9 | 8 | 13 | 46 | 45 | +1 | 35 |

Source: Football Association of Norway (in Norwegian)
Rules for classification: 1) Points; 2) Goal difference; 3) Goals scored; 4) Head-to-head points; 5) Head-to-head goal difference; 6) Head-to-head away goals scored (only if between two teams); 7) Head-to-head goals scored; 8) Play-off (only used to decide champions or relegation).

=== Norwegian Football Cup ===
| 25 July 2021 First round | Hønefoss | 0–2 | Strømsgodset | Hønefoss |
| 16:00 CEST (UTC+2) | | Report | Maigaard 21' (pen.); Hove 78' | Stadium: Hønefoss Idrettspark; Referee: Marius Lien |

| 1 August 2021 Second round | Ready | 0–1 | Strømsgodset | Oslo |
| 18:00 CEST (UTC+2) | | Report | Gunnarsson 70' | Stadium: Gressbanen; Referee: Johan William Grundt |

| 22 September 2021 Third round | Strømsgodset | 5–1 | Stabæk | Drammen |
| 18:00 CEST (UTC+2) | Stenevik 13'; Valsvik 44'; Kadiri 65', 69', 72' | Report | Ottesen 5' | Stadium: Marienlyst Stadion; Attendance: 1,700; Referee: Kristoffer Hagenes |

Fourth round took place during the 2022 season.
