= 2022 Strømsgodset Toppfotball season =

Strømsgodset
2022 season
- Chairman: Ivar Strømsjordet
- Manager(s): Bjørn Petter Ingebretsen; Håkon Wibe-Lund
- Stadium: Marienlyst Stadion
- Eliteserien: 12th
- 2021 Norwegian Cup: Semi-finals
- 2022 Norwegian Cup: Second round
- Top goalscorer: League: Johan Hove (11); All: Johan Hove (11)
Home colours	Away colours

The 2022 season was Strømsgodset Toppfotball's 115th season in existence and the club's 16th consecutive season in the top flight of Norwegian football. In addition to the domestic league, Strømsgodset Toppfotball participated in this season's edition of the Norwegian Football Cup.

== Players ==
=== First team squad ===
As of 7 August 2022

Note: Flags indicate national team as defined under FIFA eligibility rules; some limited exceptions apply. Players may hold more than one non-FIFA nationality.

No.	Pos.	Nation	Player
1	GK	NOR	Viljar Myhra
2	DF	ISL	Ari Leifsson
3	DF	NOR	Sondre Fosnæss Hanssen
4	DF	NOR	Thomas Grøgaard
5	DF	NOR	Niklas Gunnarsson
6	MF	NGA	Ipalibo Jack
7	MF	NOR	Halldor Stenevik
8	MF	NOR	Johan Hove
9	FW	NGA	Fred Friday
10	MF	NOR	Herman Stengel (vice-captain)
11	MF	NOR	Kristoffer Tokstad
17	MF	NOR	Tobias Fjeld Gulliksen

No.	Pos.	Nation	Player
18	DF	GHA	Ernest Boahene
19	FW	NOR	Jonatan Braut Brunes
20	MF	GHA	Emmanuel Danso
23	FW	NOR	Aleksander Biermann Stenseth
26	DF	NOR	Lars-Christopher Vilsvik
30	DF	NOR	Fabian Holst-Larsen
40	GK	NOR	Morten Sætra
47	MF	NOR	Andreas Waterfield Skjold
71	DF	NOR	Gustav Valsvik (captain)
84	MF	NOR	Ole Enersen
92	MF	KOS	Kreshnik Krasniqi

== Transfers ==
=== Winter ===
In: Note: Flags indicate national team as defined under FIFA eligibility rules; some limited exceptions apply. Players may hold more than one non-FIFA nationality.

No.	Pos.	Nation	Player
18	DF	GHA	Ernest Boahene (free agent)
47	MF	NOR	Andreas Waterfield Skjold (promoted from junior squad)

Out: Note: Flags indicate national team as defined under FIFA eligibility rules; some limited exceptions apply. Players may hold more than one non-FIFA nationality.

No.	Pos.	Nation	Player
3	DF	NOR	Jonathan Parr (retired)
16	FW	NGA	Jordan Attah Kadiri (loan return to (Belgium) Lommel)
23	MF	ISL	Valdimar Þór Ingimundarson (to Sogndal)
50	GK	NOR	Daniel Skretteberg (to Bærum)
56	FW	NOR	Mustapha Fofana (to Ørn Horten, previously on loan)
58	FW	NOR	Simen Hammershaug (to Egersund)
64	MF	NOR	Sebastian Pop (to Notodden, previously on loan at Fram Larvik)
80	DF	NOR	Andreas Rosendal Nyhagen (to Ull/Kisa)

=== Summer ===
In: Note: Flags indicate national team as defined under FIFA eligibility rules; some limited exceptions apply. Players may hold more than one non-FIFA nationality.

No.	Pos.	Nation	Player
19	FW	NOR	Jonatan Braut Brunes (from Lillestrøm)
20	MF	GHA	Emmanuel Danso (from (France) Lyon II)
66	FW	NOR	Albert Palmberg Thoresen (promoted from junior squad)

Out: Note: Flags indicate national team as defined under FIFA eligibility rules; some limited exceptions apply. Players may hold more than one non-FIFA nationality.

No.	Pos.	Nation	Player
88	FW	NOR	Lars-Jørgen Salvesen (to Bodø/Glimt)

== Competitions ==
=== Eliteserien ===
==== Results summary ====
Overall								Home						Away					
Pld	W	D	L	GF	GA	GD	Pts	W	D	L	GF	GA	GD	W	D	L	GF	GA	GD
30	9	6	15	44	55	−11	33	7	2	6	32	25	+7	2	4	9	12	30	−18

Last updated: 13 November 2022.

==== Results by round ====
Round	1	2	3	4	5	6	7	8	9	10	11	12	13	14	15	16	17	18	19	20	21	22	23	24	25	26	27	28	29	30
Ground	A	H	A	H	H	A	H	A	H	A	H	A	H	A	H	A	H	A	H	A	H	A	H	A	H	A	A	H	A	H
Result	L	L	W	L	W	W	W	D	W	L	W	L	D	L	D	L	W	D	W	D	L	L	W	L	W	L	D	L	L	L
Position	11	16	13	14	13	8	5	6	4	7	4	6	7	8	6	8	7	7	7	7	7	9	8	8	10	11	11	12	12	12

A = Away; H = Home; W = Win; D = Draw; L = Loss

==== Results ====
3 April 2022 1	Jerv	1–0	Strømsgodset	Grimstad
18:00 CEST (UTC+2)	Furtado 69'	Report		Stadium: J.J. Ugland Stadion – Levermyr; Attendance: 2,843; Referee: Svein Oddvar Moen

10 April 2022 2	Strømsgodset	1–3	Molde	Drammen
18:00 CEST (UTC+2)	Friday 40'	Report	Linnes 57'; Andersen 67'; Kaasa 78'	Stadium: Marienlyst Stadion; Attendance: 3,897; Referee: Tore Hansen

18 April 2022 3	Haugesund	0–1	Strømsgodset	Haugesund
18:00 CEST (UTC+2)		Report	Salvesen 81'	Stadium: Haugesund Stadion; Attendance: 3,504; Referee: Kristoffer Hagenes

23 April 2022 4	Strømsgodset	0–5	Sandefjord	Drammen
18:00 CEST (UTC+2)		Report	Ofkir 14', 70', 79'; Nyenetue 40', 62'	Stadium: Marienlyst Stadion; Attendance: 4,401; Referee: Svein Oddvar Moen

8 May 2022 5	Strømsgodset	3–0	Rosenborg	Drammen
18:00 CEST (UTC+2)	Dahl Reitan 2' (o.g.); Hove 22'; Jack 37'	Report		Stadium: Marienlyst Stadion; Attendance: 5,324; Referee: Sivert Øksnes Amland

12 May 2022 18	Viking	0–0	Strømsgodset	Stavanger
19:00 CEST (UTC+2)		Report		Stadium: Viking Stadion; Attendance: 10,110; Referee: Marius Hansen Grøtta

16 May 2022 6	Kristiansund	0–3	Strømsgodset	Kristiansund
18:00 CEST (UTC+2)		Report	Hove 23', 66'; Salvesen 42'	Stadium: Kristiansund Stadion; Attendance: 4,002; Referee: Christian Moen

22 May 2022 7	Strømsgodset	3–2	Vålerenga	Drammen
18:00 CEST (UTC+2)	Hove 33'; Salvesen 35'; Vilsvik 37'	Report	Kjartansson 52'; Dønnum 67'	Stadium: Marienlyst Stadion; Attendance: 5,053; Referee: Marius Lien

25 May 2022 8	Bodø/Glimt	2–2	Strømsgodset	Bodø
18:00 CEST (UTC+2)	Pellegrino 4'; Moe 29'	Report	Hove 36'; Friday 82'	Stadium: Aspmyra Stadion; Attendance: 4,809; Referee: Svein Oddvar Moen

28 May 2022 9	Strømsgodset	3–2	Viking	Drammen
18:00 CEST (UTC+2)	Hove 21'; Salvesen 51'; Stengel 56' (pen.)	Report	Berisha 37' (pen.), 70'	Stadium: Marienlyst Stadion; Attendance: 5,124; Referee: Svein Tore Sinnes

18 June 2022 10	Sarpsborg 08	5–1	Strømsgodset	Sarpsborg
16:00 CEST (UTC+2)	Molins 14'; Heintz 18', 90+3'; Salétros 38' (pen.), 45' (pen.)	Report	Enersen 45+2'	Stadium: Sarpsborg Stadion; Attendance: 4,770; Referee: Sivert Øksnes Amland

26 June 2022 11	Strømsgodset	3–0	Lillestrøm	Drammen
18:00 CEST (UTC+2)	Jack 53'; Tokstad 76'; Salvesen 90+7'	Report		Stadium: Marienlyst Stadion; Attendance: 5,825; Referee: Tore Hansen

3 July 2022 12	Aalesund	1–0	Strømsgodset	Ålesund
18:00 CEST (UTC+2)	Haugen 52'	Report		Stadium: Color Line Stadion; Attendance: 4,701; Referee: Marius Hansen Grøtta

9 July 2022 13	Strømsgodset	0–0	Odd	Drammen
18:00 CEST (UTC+2)		Report		Stadium: Marienlyst Stadion; Attendance: 4,461; Referee: Daniel Higraff

24 July 2022 15	Strømsgodset	1–1	HamKam	Drammen
20:00 CEST (UTC+2)	Jack 49'	Report	Onsrud 74'	Stadium: Marienlyst Stadion; Attendance: 4,358; Referee: Christian Moen

31 July 2022 16	Molde	3–0	Strømsgodset	Molde
15:30 CEST (UTC+2)	Grødem 9'; Brynhildsen 72'; Zekhnini 90+1'	Report		Stadium: Aker Stadion; Attendance: 5,791; Referee: Ola Hobber Nilsen

7 August 2022 17	Strømsgodset	3–1	Sarpsborg 08	Drammen
18:00 CEST (UTC+2)	Vilsvik 28'; Stengel 40'; Boahene 81'	Report	Torp 58'	Stadium: Marienlyst Stadion; Attendance: 4,422; Referee: Marius Hansen Grøtta

21 August 2022 19	Strømsgodset	6–0	Jerv	Drammen
18:00 CEST (UTC+2)	Hove 16'; Jack 58'; Friday 61', 88'; Gulliksen 63', 77'	Report		Stadium: Marienlyst Stadion; Attendance: 5,342; Referee: Kristoffer Hagenes

28 August 2022 20	Sandefjord	2–2	Strømsgodset	Sandefjord
18:00 CEST (UTC+2)	Ruud Tveter 68'; Taaje 80'	Report	Hove 61'; Stengel 90+1'	Stadium: Release Arena; Attendance: 2,732; Referee: Espen Eskås

31 August 2022 14	Tromsø	1–0	Strømsgodset	Tromsø
19:00 CEST (UTC+2)	Norheim 7'	Report		Stadium: Alfheim Stadion; Attendance: 2,880; Referee: Marius Lien

4 September 2022 21	Strømsgodset	1–2	Aalesund	Drammen
18:00 CEST (UTC+2)	Valsvik 61'	Report	Ebiye 26', 45+2'	Stadium: Marienlyst Stadion; Attendance: 4,602; Referee: Svein Tore Sinnes

10 September 2022 22	Lillestrøm	2–1	Strømsgodset	Lillestrøm
18:00 CEST (UTC+2)	Åsen 13'; Dragsnes 43'	Report	Valsvik 80'	Stadium: Åråsen Stadion; Attendance: 4,807; Referee: Kristoffer Hagenes

18 September 2022 23	Strømsgodset	4–1	Kristiansund	Drammen
18:00 CEST (UTC+2)	Hove 14', 67'; Valsvik 45+3'; Friday 77'	Report	Moumbagna 85' (pen.)	Stadium: Marienlyst Stadion; Attendance: 4,933; Referee: Svein Oddvar Moen

1 October 2022 24	Vålerenga	4–0	Strømsgodset	Oslo
18:00 CEST (UTC+2)	Børven 17', 19'; Layouni 30', 43'	Report		Stadium: Intility Arena; Attendance: 7,545; Referee: Marius Hansen Grøtta

9 October 2022 25	Strømsgodset	1–2	Tromsø	Drammen
17:00 CEST (UTC+2)	Brunes 11'	Report	Mikkelsen 28'; Kitolano 87'	Stadium: Marienlyst Stadion; Attendance: 4,698; Referee: Tore Hansen

15 October 2022 26	Rosenborg	3–0	Strømsgodset	Trondheim
18:00 CEST (UTC+2)	Sæter 24'; Tengstedt 29'; Vecchia 89'	Report		Stadium: Lerkendal Stadion; Attendance: 10,283; Referee: Espen Eskås

23 October 2022 27	HamKam	1–1	Strømsgodset	Hamar
17:00 CEST (UTC+2)	Kuruçay 31'	Report	Hove 41'	Stadium: Briskeby Stadion; Attendance: 4,374; Referee: Daniel Higraff

29 October 2022 28	Strømsgodset	1–2	Haugesund	Drammen
18:00 CEST (UTC+2)	Grøgaard 45+3'	Report	Reese 25'; Njie 49'	Stadium: Marienlyst Stadion; Attendance: 4,742; Referee: Marius Hansen Grøtta

6 November 2022 29	Odd	5–1	Strømsgodset	Skien
17:00 CET (UTC+1)	Hoff 1', 47'; Jørgensen 20'; Wallem 83'; Stensrud 88'	Report	Brunes 26'	Stadium: Skagerak Arena; Attendance: 5,043; Referee: Tore Hansen

13 November 2022 30	Strømsgodset	2–4	Bodø/Glimt	Drammen
17:00 CET (UTC+1)	Gunnarsson 16'; Brunes 56'	Report	Valsvik 42' (o.g.); Espejord 47'; Høibråten 75'; Pellegrino 87'	Stadium: Marienlyst Stadion; Attendance: 5,887; Referee: Svein Oddvar Moen

==== Table ====
Pos	Team	Pld	W	D	L	GF	GA	GD	Pts	Qualification or relegation
10	Haugesund	30	10	8	12	42	46	−4	38	
11	Viking	30	9	8	13	48	54	−6	35	
12	Strømsgodset	30	9	6	15	44	55	−11	33	
13	HamKam	30	6	13	11	33	43	−10	31	
14	Sandefjord (O)	30	6	6	18	42	68	−26	24	Qualification for the relegation play-offs

Source: Football Association of Norway (in Norwegian)
Rules for classification: 1) Points; 2) Goal difference; 3) Goals scored; 4) Head-to-head points; 5) Head-to-head goal difference; 6) Head-to-head goals scored.
(O) Play-off winners

=== Norwegian Football Cup ===
==== 2021 ====
12 March 2022 Fourth round	Raufoss	1–1 (a.e.t.) (5–6 p)	Strømsgodset	Raufoss
15:00 CET (UTC+1)	G. Simenstad 115'	Report	Salvesen 104'	Stadium: Raufoss Storhall; Referee: Ola Hobber Nilsen
	Penalties
	M. Johnsgård (penalty scored); M. Fagernes (penalty scored); E. Bydal (penalty scored); G. Simenstad (penalty scored); M. Aanesland (penalty missed); S. Westerlund (penalty scored); N. Fremstad (penalty missed)		(penalty scored) Stengel; (penalty missed) Salvesen; (penalty scored) Vilsvik; (penalty scored) Hove; (penalty scored) Sætra; (penalty scored) Friday; (penalty scored) Gulliksen

19 March 2022 Quarter-finals	Sandnes Ulf	0–4	Strømsgodset	Sandnes
20:00 CET (UTC+1)		Report	Krasniqi 3', 53'; Gulliksen 58'; Salvesen 83'	Stadium: Øster Hus Arena; Attendance: 3,029; Referee: Kai Erik Steen

6 April 2022 Semi-finals	Molde	3–0	Strømsgodset	Molde
18:00 CEST (UTC+2)	Eikrem 58', 78'; Leifsson 88' (o.g.)	Report		Stadium: Aker Stadion; Attendance: 3,805; Referee: Espen Eskås

==== 2022 ====
19 May 2022 First round	Hønefoss	0–4	Strømsgodset	Hønefoss
18:00 CEST (UTC+2)		Report	Krasniqi 54', 74'; Friday 66'; Gunnarsson 72'	Stadium: Aka Arena; Attendance: 847; Referee: Stian Røvig Sletner

22 June 2022 Second round	Gjøvik-Lyn	3–2 (a.e.t.)	Strømsgodset	Gjøvik
18:00 CEST (UTC+2)	Ravndal 54'; Skogli 111'; Østerud 120'	Report	Stengel 34'; Friday 106'	Stadium: Gjøvik Stadion; Attendance: 1,250; Referee: Jørgen Haugen
