= 2020 Strømsgodset Toppfotball season =

Strømsgodset
2020 season
- President: Ivar Strømsjordet
- Manager: Henrik Pedersen
- Stadium: Marienlyst Stadion
- Eliteserien: 13th
- Norwegian Cup: Canceled due to the COVID-19 pandemic
- Top goalscorer: League: Two players (10); All: Two players (10)
Home colours	Away colours

The 2020 season was Strømsgodset's fourteenth season back in Eliteserien since their promotion in the 2006 season.

== Season events ==
Prior to the start of the season Tobias Gulliksen and Sondre Hanssen were promoted from the youth team.

On 12 June, the Norwegian Football Federation announced that a maximum of 200 home fans would be allowed to attend the upcoming seasons matches.

On 10 September, the Norwegian Football Federation cancelled the 2020 Norwegian Cup due to the COVID-19 pandemic in Norway.

On 30 September, the Minister of Culture and Gender Equality, Abid Raja, announced that clubs would be able to have crowds of 600 at games from 12 October.

On 28 November, Strømsgodset's match against Odd on 2 December was postponed due to a positive COVID-19 case within the Odd squad and the whole squad having to quarantine.

== Squad ==
As of 31 July 2020

Note: Flags indicate national team as defined under FIFA eligibility rules; some limited exceptions apply. Players may hold more than one non-FIFA nationality.

No.	Pos.	Nation	Player
1	GK	NOR	Viljar Myhra
2	DF	ISL	Ari Leifsson
3	DF	NOR	Jonathan Parr
4	DF	CMR	Duplexe Tchamba (on loan from Strasbourg)
5	DF	NOR	Niklas Gunnarsson
7	MF	NOR	Herman Stengel (Vice-captain)
8	MF	NOR	Johan Hove
9	FW	DEN	Marcus Mølvadgaard
10	FW	NOR	Moses Mawa
11	FW	NOR	Kristoffer Tokstad
14	DF	NOR	Nicholas Mickelson
17	MF	NOR	Tobias Fjeld Gulliksen

No.	Pos.	Nation	Player
19	FW	NOR	Halldor Stenevik
20	MF	DEN	Mikkel Maigaard (Captain)
22	DF	FRA	Prosper Mendy
26	DF	NOR	Lars-Christopher Vilsvik
40	GK	NOR	Morten Sætra
42	MF	NGA	Ipalibo Jack
56	FW	NOR	Mustapha Fofana
64	MF	NOR	Sebastian Pop
70	DF	NOR	Sondre Fosnæss Hanssen
88	FW	NOR	Lars-Jørgen Salvesen
92	MF	KOS	Kreshnik Krasniqi

=== Out on loan ===
Note: Flags indicate national team as defined under FIFA eligibility rules; some limited exceptions apply. Players may hold more than one non-FIFA nationality.

No.	Pos.	Nation	Player
63	FW	NOR	Magnus Dahlby (at Grorud until 31 December 2020)
—	GK	NOR	Matias Finnestrand (at Florø until 31 December 2020)
—	DF	NOR	Mathias Fjeld Gulliksen (at Florø until 31 December 2020)
—	DF	NOR	Andreas Nyhagen (at Moss until 31 December 2020)
—	FW	NOR	Sebastian Pedersen (at Notodden until 31 August 2020)

== Transfers ==
=== In ===
Date	Position	Nationality	Name	From	Fee	Ref.
3 February 2020	DF	(Norway)	Niklas Gunnarsson	Sarpsborg	Undisclosed	
4 February 2020	FW	(Denmark)	Marcus Mølvadgaard	Randers	Undisclosed	
2 March 2020	DF	(Iceland)	Ari Leifsson	Fylkir	Undisclosed	
11 February 2020	MF	(Latvia)	Jānis Ikaunieks	FK Liepaja	Undisclosed	
30 June 2020	MF	(Nigeria)	Ipalibo Jack	Villarreal C	Undisclosed	

=== Out ===
Date	Position	Nationality	Name	To	Fee	Ref.
6 December 2019	MF	(Norway)	Hasan Duman	Åssiden	Undisclosed	
31 January 2020	DF	(Norway)	Jakob Glesnes	Philadelphia Union	Undisclosed	
20 February 2020	DF	(Norway)	Lars Sætra	Tromsø	Undisclosed	
21 February 2020	DF	(Norway)	Arnar Thor Gudjonsson	Grorud	Undisclosed	
5 March 2020	MF	(Norway)	Mathias Gjerstrøm	Kongsvinger	Undisclosed	

=== Loans out ===
Date from	Position	Nationality	Name	to	Date to	Ref.
2 February 2020	DF	(Norway)	Andreas Nyhagen	Moss	29 June 2020	
2 July 2020	MF	(Norway)	Magnus Dahlby	Grorud	End of season	
9 July 2020	FW	(Norway)	Sebastian Pedersen	Notodden	End of season	

=== Released ===
Date	Position	Nationality	Name	Joined	Date
4 December 2019	GK	(Denmark)	Martin Hansen	Hannover 96	21 January 2020
4 December 2019	DF	(Norway)	Mounir Hamoud	Retired	
4 December 2019	DF	(Norway)	Christopher Lindquist	KFUM Oslo	
4 December 2019	MF	(Norway)	Henning Hauger		
4 December 2019	MF	(Norway)	Muhamed Keita	Ohod Club	2 January 2020
4 December 2019	MF	(Norway)	Martin Ovenstad	Mjøndalen	
10 February 2020	MF	(Denmark)	Martin Spelmann	Mjällby	
31 July 2020	MF	(Latvia)	Jānis Ikaunieks	RFS	6 August 2020

== Competitions ==
=== Eliteserien ===
==== Results summary ====
Overall								Home						Away					
Pld	W	D	L	GF	GA	GD	Pts	W	D	L	GF	GA	GD	W	D	L	GF	GA	GD
30	7	10	13	41	57	−16	31	3	6	6	19	29	−10	4	4	7	22	28	−6

Last updated: 22 December 2020.
Source: Results

==== Results by round ====
Round	1	2	3	4	5	6	7	8	9	10	11	12	13	14	15	16	17	18	19	20	21	22	23	24	25	26	27	28	29	30
Ground	A	H	A	H	A	H	A	H	H	A	H	A	H	A	H	A	H	A	H	A	H	A	H	A	H	A	H	A	A	H
Result	D	W	W	D	L	D	L	W	L	L	W	L	L	W	L	D	D	D	D	D	D	L	L	L	L	L	D	W	W	L
Position	6	7	4	4	7	5	9	8	8	9	9	9	10	9	10	11	12	12	13	11	11	12	13	13	14	14	14	13	13	13

Updated to match(es) played on 22 December 2020. Source: Results
A = Away; H = Home; W = Win; D = Draw; L = Loss

==== Results ====
17 June 2020 1	Start	2–2	Strømsgodset	Kristiansand
18:00 CEST (UTC+2)	Bringaker 65'; Markovic 73'	Report	Parr (yellow card) 43'; Salvesen 45+1'; Stengel 83'	Stadium: Sør Arena; Attendance: 200; Referee: Svein Oddvar Moen

21 June 2020 2	Strømsgodset	1–0	Odd	Drammen
18:00 CEST (UTC+2)	Hove 2'; Leifsson (yellow card) 25'; Mickelson (yellow card) 62'; Salvesen (yellow card) 82'	Report	Risa (yellow card) 90+3'	Stadium: Marienlyst Stadion; Attendance: 200; Referee: Tore Hansen

25 June 2020 3	Sarpsborg 08	2–3	Strømsgodset	Sarpsborg
18:00 CEST (UTC+2)	Halvorsen (penalty missed) 11'; Utvik (yellow card) 33'; Abdellaoue 52', 79' (pen.); Jakobsen (yellow card) 74'	Report	Maigaard 30' (pen.), 33' (pen.); Hove 54'; Gunnarsson (yellow card) 57'; Leifsson (yellow card) 65'; Mølvadgaard (yellow card) 90+1'	Stadium: Sarpsborg Stadion; Attendance: 200; Referee: Ola Hobber Nilsen

28 June 2020 4	Strømsgodset	1–1	Aalesund	Drammen
18:00 CEST (UTC+2)	Gunnarsson (yellow card) 53'; Maigaard 89' (pen.); Jack (red card) 90+5'	Report	Haugen 30' (yellow card) 47'; Sæthre (yellow card) 37'; Sno (yellow card) 43'; Uzochukwu (yellow card) 90'	Stadium: Marienlyst Stadion; Attendance: 200; Referee: Marius Hansen Grøtta

1 July 2020 5	Stabæk	2–0	Strømsgodset	Bærum
18:00 CEST (UTC+2)	Hansen 33', 41'	Report	Mølvadgaard (yellow card) 84'	Stadium: Nadderud Stadion; Attendance: 200; Referee: Ola Hobber Nilsen

5 July 2020 6	Strømsgodset	2–2	Kristiansund	Drammen
18:00 CEST (UTC+2)	Hove 55'; Mawa 77'	Report	Pellegrino 27', 39'; Coly (yellow card) 45+2'; Askar (yellow card) 59'	Stadium: Marienlyst Stadion; Attendance: 200; Referee: Tore Hansen

11 July 2020 7	Rosenborg	3–0	Strømsgodset	Trondheim
20:30 CEST (UTC+2)	Helland 68'; Zachariassen (yellow card) 78' (goal) 81'; Børven 90+2'	Report	Parr (yellow card) 35'; Jack (yellow card) 43'	Stadium: Lerkendal Stadion; Attendance: 200; Referee: Ola Hobber Nilsen

15 July 2020 8	Strømsgodset	2–1	Mjøndalen	Drammen
18:00 CEST (UTC+2)	Maigaard (yellow card) 45'; Mawa 50'; Salvesen 54'; Parr (yellow card) 84'	Report	Aasmundsen (yellow card) 73'; Hellum (yellow card) 81'; Nakkim 86' (pen.)	Stadium: Marienlyst Stadion; Attendance: 200; Referee: Svein Oddvar Moen

19 July 2020 9	Strømsgodset	0–4	Molde	Drammen
18:00 CEST (UTC+2)	Salvesen (yellow card) 89'	Report	Hestad 44' (yellow card) 71'; Hussain 58'; James 60'; Eikrem (yellow card) 75'; Knudtzon 80'	Stadium: Marienlyst Stadion; Attendance: 200; Referee: Ola Hobber Nilsen

26 July 2020 10	Vålerenga	2–0	Strømsgodset	Oslo
18:00 CEST (UTC+2)	Tollås (yellow card) 21'; Sahraoui 36'; Gunnarsson 48' (o.g.); Jensen (yellow card) 49'	Report		Stadium: Intility Arena; Attendance: 200; Referee: Tommy Skjerven

29 July 2020 11	Strømsgodset	3–1	Brann	Drammen
18:00 CEST (UTC+2)	Teniste 8' (o.g.); Gunnarsson (yellow card) 21'; Mawa 54'; Mølvadgaard 90+3'	Report	Koomson 72'	Stadium: Marienlyst Stadion; Attendance: 200; Referee: Tom Harald Hagen

2 August 2020 12	Bodø/Glimt	3–2	Strømsgodset	Bodø
18:00 CEST (UTC+2)	Zinckernagel 12'; Mickelson 28' (o.g.); J.Hauge 67'; Boniface (yellow card) 85'	Report	Mawa 13' (yellow card) 90+1'; Hove (yellow card) 24'; Tokstad 66'; Mickelson (yellow card) 69'	Stadium: Aspmyra Stadion; Attendance: 200; Referee: Marius Hansen Grøtta

9 August 2020 13	Strømsgodset	3–4	Sandefjord	Drammen
18:00 CEST (UTC+2)	Hove 18'; Salvesen (yellow card) 28' (goal) 52'; Maigaard 54' (pen.) (penalty missed) 66'; Gunnarsson (yellow card) 63'	Report	Rufo 6'; Kurtovic (yellow card) 16'; Gussiås 45+1', 63' (pen.); Kreuzriegler (yellow card) 55' (yellow-red card) 90+3'; Hansen 90+4'	Stadium: Marienlyst Stadion; Attendance: 200; Referee: Kristoffer Hagenes

16 August 2020 14	Haugesund	2–3	Strømsgodset	Haugesund
18:00 CEST (UTC+2)	Hansen (yellow card) 52'; Velde (yellow card) 77'; Ammitzbøll 83'; Vilsvik 90+1' (o.g.)	Report	Hove 9'; Krasniqi (yellow card) 49'; Mickelson (yellow card) 60'; Maigaard 80'; Salvesen 90+2'	Stadium: Haugesund Stadion; Attendance: 200; Referee: Sivert Amland

22 August 2020 15	Strømsgodset	0–2	Viking	Drammen
18:00 CEST (UTC+2)	Mawa (yellow card) 36'; Krasniqi (yellow card) 61'; Tokstad (yellow card) 88'	Report	Jack 74' (o.g.); Bell 90+1'	Stadium: Marienlyst Stadion; Attendance: 200; Referee: Kai Erik Steen

29 August 2020 16	Brann	1–1	Strømsgodset	Bergen
20:30 CEST (UTC+2)	Strand 33'	Report	Hove 42'	Stadium: Brann Stadion; Attendance: 200; Referee: Ola Hobber Nilsen

13 September 2020 17	Strømsgodset	3–3	Rosenborg	Drammen
18:00 CEST (UTC+2)	Salvesen 16'; Hedenstad 18' (o.g.); Vilsvik (yellow card) 31'; Gunnarsson (yellow card) 34'; Hove 59'	Report	Børven 22'; Skjelbred 84'; Islamović 87'	Stadium: Marienlyst Stadion; Attendance: 200; Referee: Sivert Øksnes Amland

20 September 2020 18	Sandefjord	0–0	Strømsgodset	Sandefjord
18:00 CEST (UTC+2)		Report		Stadium: Sandefjord Arena; Attendance: 200; Referee: Tore Hansen

26 September 2020 19	Strømsgodset	0–0	Sarpsborg 08	Drammen
20:30 CEST (UTC+2)	Jack (yellow card) 45'	Report	Dyrestam (yellow card) 49'	Stadium: Marienlyst Stadion; Attendance: 200; Referee: Kristoffer Hagenes

4 October 2020 20	Viking	2–2	Strømsgodset	Stavanger
18:00 CEST (UTC+2)	Vevatne 76'; Høiland (yellow card) 88' de Lanlay 90+4'	Report	Mawa (yellow card) 26'; Salvesen 53'; Tokstad (yellow card) 63'; Leifsson (yellow card) 66'; Hove 74'	Stadium: Viking Stadion; Attendance: 200; Referee: Dag Vidar Hafsås

18 October 2020 21	Strømsgodset	1–1	Start	Drammen
18:00 CEST (UTC+2)	Jack (yellow card) 39' (yellow-red card) 68'; Mawa 78'; Gunnarsson (yellow card) 79'; Mickelson (yellow card) 90+3'	Report	Bolaños 39' (pen.); El Makrini (yellow card) 66'	Stadium: Marienlyst Stadion; Attendance: 600; Referee: Espen Eskås

25 October 2020 22	Molde	2–1	Strømsgodset	Molde
18:00 CET (UTC+1)	Ellingsen 70'; James 82'	Report	Ingimundarson 86'	Stadium: Aker Stadion; Attendance: 600; Referee: Sivert Amland

1 November 2020 23	Strømsgodset	0–2	Vålerenga	Drammen
20:30 CET (UTC+1)	Maigaard (yellow card) 45+1'; Gunnarsson (yellow card) 73'	Report	Bjørdal 15'; Dønnum (yellow card) 46+1'; Borchgrevink 76'	Stadium: Marienlyst Stadion; Attendance: 600; Referee: Kai Erik Steen

7 November 2020 24	Mjøndalen	3–0	Strømsgodset	Mjøndalen
18:00 CET (UTC+1)	Sveen 4'; Ovenstad (yellow card) 6'; Brustad 58'; Aasmundsen 84'; Solberg (yellow card) 87'	Report	Vilsvik (yellow card) 27'; Stengel (yellow card) 87'	Stadium: Consto Arena; Attendance: 200; Referee: Tore Hansen

22 November 2020 25	Strømsgodset	1–2	Bodø/Glimt	Drammen
18:00 CET (UTC+1)	Ingimundarson 84'	Report	Junker 4'; Zinckernagel 12'; Boniface (yellow card) 82'	Stadium: Marienlyst Stadion; Attendance: 200; Referee: Espen Eskås

29 November 2020 26	Kristiansund	2–1	Strømsgodset	Kristiansund
18:00 CET (UTC+1)	Psyché (yellow card) 18' (yellow-red card) 81'; Aasbak (yellow card) 53'; Pellegrino 57' (pen.), 69' (pen.); Moumbagna (yellow card) 66'	Report	Mawa 5'; Maigaard (yellow card) 25'; Stengel (yellow card) 53'; Stenevik (yellow card) 65'	Stadium: Kristiansund Stadion; Attendance: 600; Referee: Tom Harald Hagen

6 December 2020 28	Strømsgodset	2–2	Haugesund	Drammen
17:00 CET (UTC+1)	Hove 25'; Gunnarsson (yellow card) 61'; Tokstad (yellow card) 80'; Stengel (yellow card) 90'	Report	Therkildsen 69' (yellow card) 88'; Velde (yellow card) 79'; Ammitzbøll 90+1'	Stadium: Marienlyst Stadion; Attendance: 200; Referee: Marius Hansen Grøtta

9 December 2020 29	Aalesund	1–4	Strømsgodset	Ålesund
18:00 CET (UTC+1)	Grønner (yellow card) 39'; Karlsbakk 80'	Report	Hove 10'; Tokstad (yellow card) 14'; Mwimba 47' (o.g.); Salvesen 54'; Tchamba 63'	Stadium: Color Line Stadion; Attendance: 600; Referee: Sivert Amland

19 December 2020 27	Odd	1–3	Strømsgodset	Skien
18:00 CET (UTC+1)	Rashani 20'; Rodić (yellow card) 39'; Joh.Kitolano (yellow card) 52'; Kaasa (yellow card) 58'	Report	Salvesen 9', 53', 66'; Gunnarsson (yellow card) 31'	Stadium: Skagerak Arena; Attendance: 300; Referee: Tom Harald Hagen
Note: Match originally scheduled for 2 December, but postponed on 28 November due to the COVID-19 pandemic.

22 December 2020 30	Strømsgodset	0–4	Stabæk	Drammen
18:00 CET (UTC+1)	Salvesen (penalty missed) 67'; Gulliksen (yellow card) 77'	Report	Hansen 44'; Kostadinov (yellow card) 49'; Maatsen 79', 85'; Kinoshita 90+3'	Stadium: Marienlyst Stadion; Attendance: 200; Referee: Kai Erik Steen

==== Table ====
Pos	Team	Pld	W	D	L	GF	GA	GD	Pts	Qualification or relegation
11	Sandefjord	30	9	8	13	31	43	−12	35	
12	Sarpsborg 08	30	8	8	14	33	43	−10	32	
13	Strømsgodset	30	7	10	13	41	57	−16	31	
14	Mjøndalen (O)	30	8	3	19	26	45	−19	27	Qualification for the relegation play-offs
15	Start (R)	30	6	9	15	33	56	−23	27	Relegation to First Division

Source: Football Association of Norway (in Norwegian)
Rules for classification: 1) Points; 2) Goal difference; 3) Goals scored; 4) Head-to-head points; 5) Head-to-head goal difference; 6) Head-to-head away goals scored (only if between two teams); 7) Head-to-head goals scored; 8) Play-off (only used to decide champions or relegation).
(O) Play-off winners; (R) Relegated

=== Norwegian Cup ===
2020 First round	–
CEST (UTC+2)
Note: Cup cancelled on 10 September due to the COVID-19 pandemic in Norway.

== Squad statistics ==
As of match played 22 December 2020

=== Appearances and goals ===
No.	Pos	Nat	Player	Total		Eliteserien		Norwegian Cup	
No.	Pos	Nat	Player	Apps	Goals	Apps	Goals	Apps	Goals
1	GK	(Norway) NOR	Viljar Myhra	30	0	30	0	0	0
2	DF	(Iceland) ISL	Ari Leifsson	14	0	8+6	0	0	0
3	DF	(Norway) NOR	Jonathan Parr	4	0	3+1	0	0	0
4	DF	(Cameroon) CMR	Duplexe Tchamba	12	1	11+1	1	0	0
5	DF	(Norway) NOR	Niklas Gunnarsson	26	0	26	0	0	0
7	MF	(Norway) NOR	Herman Stengel	15	1	10+5	1	0	0
8	MF	(Norway) NOR	Johan Hove	30	10	29+1	10	0	0
9	FW	(Denmark) DEN	Marcus Mølvadgaard	18	1	0+18	1	0	0
10	FW	(Norway) NOR	Moses Mawa	30	6	27+3	6	0	0
11	MF	(Norway) NOR	Kristoffer Tokstad	28	2	22+6	2	0	0
14	DF	(Norway) NOR	Nicholas Mickelson	22	0	21+1	0	0	0
17	MF	(Norway) NOR	Tobias Gulliksen	7	0	1+6	0	0	0
19	MF	(Norway) NOR	Halldor Stenevik	21	0	9+12	0	0	0
20	MF	(Denmark) DEN	Mikkel Maigaard	28	5	28	5	0	0
23	MF	(Iceland) ISL	Valdimar Ingimundarson	11	2	8+3	2	0	0
26	DF	(Norway) NOR	Lars-Christopher Vilsvik	25	0	24+1	0	0	0
42	MF	(Nigeria) NGA	Ipalibo Jack	22	0	22	0	0	0
51	MF	(Norway) NOR	Aleksander Stenseth	6	0	0+6	0	0	0
58	FW	(Norway) NOR	Simen Hammershaug	2	0	0+2	0	0	0
64	MF	(Norway) NOR	Sebastian Pop	2	0	0+2	0	0	0
70	DF	(Norway) NOR	Sondre Fosnæss Hanssen	19	0	18+1	0	0	0
80	DF	(Norway) NOR	Andreas Rosendal Nyhagen	5	0	1+4	0	0	0
88	FW	(Norway) NOR	Lars-Jørgen Salvesen	30	10	30	10	0	0
92	MF	(Kosovo) KOS	Kreshnik Krasniqi	5	0	0+5	0	0	0
Players away from Strømsgodset on loan:
Players who left Strømsgodset during the season
23	MF	(Latvia) LVA	Jānis Ikaunieks	6	0	2+4	0	0	0

=== Goal scorers ===
Place	Position	Nation	Number	Name	Eliteserien	Norwegian Cup	Total
1	MF	(Norway)	8	Johan Hove	10	0	10
1	FW	(Norway)	88	Lars-Jørgen Salvesen	10	0	10
3	FW	(Norway)	10	Moses Mawa	6	0	6
4	MF	(Denmark)	20	Mikkel Maigaard	5	0	5
5				Own goal	3	0	3
6	MF	(Iceland)	23	Valdimar Ingimundarson	2	0	2
6	FW	(Norway)	11	Kristoffer Tokstad	2	0	2
8	MF	(Norway)	7	Herman Stengel	1	0	1
8	FW	(Denmark)	9	Marcus Mølvadgaard	1	0	1
8	DF	(Cameroon)	4	Duplexe Tchamba	1	0	1
				TOTALS	41	0	41

=== Clean sheets ===
Place	Position	Nation	Number	Name	Eliteserien	Norwegian Cup	Total
1	GK	(Norway)	1	Viljar Myhra	1	0	1
				TOTALS	1	0	1

=== Disciplinary record ===
Number	Nation	Position	Name	Eliteserien		Norwegian Cup		Total	
Number	Nation	Position	Name	Booked	Sent off (straight red)	Booked	Sent off (straight red)	Booked	Sent off (straight red)
2	(Iceland)	DF	Ari Leifsson	3	0	0	0	3	0
3	(Norway)	DF	Jonathan Parr	3	0	0	0	3	0
5	(Norway)	DF	Niklas Gunnarsson	9	0	0	0	9	0
7	(Norway)	MF	Herman Stengel	3	0	0	0	3	0
8	(Norway)	MF	Johan Hove	1	0	0	0	1	0
9	(Denmark)	FW	Marcus Mølvadgaard	2	0	0	0	2	0
10	(Norway)	FW	Moses Mawa	3	0	0	0	3	0
11	(Norway)	MF	Kristoffer Tokstad	3	0	0	0	3	0
14	(Norway)	DF	Nicholas Mickelson	4	0	0	0	4	0
17	(Norway)	MF	Tobias Gulliksen	1	0	0	0	1	0
19	(Norway)	MF	Halldor Stenevik	1	0	0	0	1	0
20	(Denmark)	MF	Mikkel Maigaard	3	0	0	0	3	0
26	(Norway)	DF	Lars-Christopher Vilsvik	2	0	0	0	2	0
42	(Nigeria)	MF	Ipalibo Jack	4	2	0	0	4	2
88	(Norway)	FW	Lars-Jørgen Salvesen	3	0	0	0	3	0
92	(Kosovo)	MF	Kreshnik Krasniqi	2	0	0	0	2	0
Players who left Strømsgodset during the season:
			TOTALS	47	2	0	0	47	2
