= 2023 Strømsgodset Toppfotball season =

Strømsgodset
2023 season
- Chairman: Ivar Strømsjordet
- Manager: Jørgen Isnes
- Stadium: Marienlyst Stadion
- Eliteserien: 7th
- Norwegian Cup: Fourth round
- Top goalscorer: League: Jonatan Braut Brunes (6); All: Jonatan Braut Brunes (11)
Home colours	Away colours

The 2023 season was Strømsgodset Toppfotball's 116th season in existence and the club's 17th consecutive season in the top flight of Norwegian football. In addition to the domestic league, Strømsgodset Toppfotball participated in this season's edition of the Norwegian Football Cup.

== Players ==
=== First team squad ===
As of 22 July 2023

Note: Flags indicate national team as defined under FIFA eligibility rules; some limited exceptions apply. Players may hold more than one non-FIFA nationality.

No.	Pos.	Nation	Player
1	GK	NOR	Viljar Myhra
2	DF	ISL	Ari Leifsson
3	DF	NOR	Sondre Fosnæss Hanssen
4	DF	NOR	Thomas Grøgaard
5	DF	NOR	Bent Sørmo
7	MF	NOR	Halldor Stenevik
8	MF	KOS	Kreshnik Krasniqi
9	FW	NOR	Elias Melkersen (on loan from Hibernian)
10	MF	NOR	Herman Stengel (vice-captain)
11	FW	NOR	Jostein Ekeland
14	MF	NOR	Ole Enersen
15	MF	NOR	Andreas Heredia-Randen

No.	Pos.	Nation	Player
17	DF	ISL	Logi Tómasson
18	DF	GHA	Ernest Boahene
20	MF	GHA	Emmanuel Danso
21	MF	IRQ	Marko Farji
23	MF	NOR	Eirik Ulland Andersen
26	DF	NOR	Lars-Christopher Vilsvik
27	DF	NOR	Fredrik Kristensen Dahl
30	DF	NOR	Fabian Holst-Larsen
40	GK	NOR	Morten Sætra
71	DF	NOR	Gustav Valsvik (captain)
77	FW	NOR	Marcus Mehnert

== Transfers ==
=== Winter ===
In: Note: Flags indicate national team as defined under FIFA eligibility rules; some limited exceptions apply. Players may hold more than one non-FIFA nationality.

No.	Pos.	Nation	Player
11	MF	NOR	Jostein Ekeland (from Sandnes Ulf)
15	MF	NOR	Andreas Heredia-Randen (from Asker)
21	MF	NOR	Marko Farji (promoted from junior squad)
22	MF	NOR	Jonas T. Therkelsen (promoted from junior squad)
27	DF	NOR	Fredrik Kristensen Dahl (from KFUM)
28	DF	NOR	Eirik Espelid Blikstad (promoted from junior squad)
77	FW	NOR	Marcus Mehnert (from Ranheim)

Out: Note: Flags indicate national team as defined under FIFA eligibility rules; some limited exceptions apply. Players may hold more than one non-FIFA nationality.

No.	Pos.	Nation	Player
5	DF	NOR	Niklas Gunnarsson (to (Sweden) Norrköping)
8	MF	NOR	Johan Hove (to (Netherlands) Groningen)
9	FW	NGR	Fred Friday (to (Israel) Beitar Jerusalem)
11	MF	NOR	Kristoffer Tokstad (to Mjøndalen)
23	FW	NOR	Aleksander Biermann Stenseth (released)

=== Summer ===
In: Note: Flags indicate national team as defined under FIFA eligibility rules; some limited exceptions apply. Players may hold more than one non-FIFA nationality.

No.	Pos.	Nation	Player
5	DF	NOR	Bent Sørmo (from (Belgium) Zulte Waregem)
9	FW	NOR	Elias Hoff Melkersen (on loan from (Scotland) Hibs)
17	DF	ISL	Logi Tómasson (from (Iceland) Víkingur)
19	FW	NOR	Chrisander B. Sørum (promoted from junior squad)
23	MF	NOR	Eirik Ulland Andersen (from Molde)

Out: Note: Flags indicate national team as defined under FIFA eligibility rules; some limited exceptions apply. Players may hold more than one non-FIFA nationality.

No.	Pos.	Nation	Player
6	MF	NGR	Jack Ipalibo (to (Greece) Kifisia)
9	FW	NOR	Jonatan Braut Brunes (to (Belgium) OH Leuven)
17	FW	NOR	Tobias Fjeld Gulliksen (to Bodø/Glimt)
19	FW	NOR	Albert Palmberg Thorsen (to (United States) Pittsburgh Panthers)
47	MF	NOR	Andreas Waterfield Skjold (to Notodden)

== Pre-season and friendlies ==
Win Draw Loss

4 March 2023 Friendly	Odd (Norway)	1–0	(Norway) Strømsgodset	Skien
16:00 CET (UTC+1)	Midtskogen 76'			Stadium: Skagerak Arena

12 March 2023 Friendly	Strømsgodset (Norway)	0–2	(Norway) Sarpsborg 08	Drammen
17:00 CET (UTC+1)				Stadium: Marienlyst Stadion

17 March 2023 Friendly	Vålerenga (Norway)	3–2	(Norway) Strømsgodset	Oslo
12:30 CET (UTC+1)	Thiago Holm 3'; Strand 64'; Dicko Eng 73'	Report	Valsvik 34'; Ekeland 38'	Stadium: Intility Arena

25 March 2023 Friendly	Strømsgodset (Norway)	4–0	(Norway) Mjøndalen	Drammen
16:00 CET (UTC+1)	Grøgaard 31'; Brunes 66'; Stengel 81' (pen.); Thorsen 90+3'			Stadium: Marienlyst Stadion

2 April 2023 Friendly	Strømsgodset (Norway)	2–2	(Norway) Sandefjord	Drammen
17:00 CEST (UTC+2)				Stadium: Marienlyst Stadion

== Competitions ==
=== Overview ===
Competition	First match	Last match	Starting round	Final position	Record							
Competition	First match	Last match	Starting round	Final position	Pld	W	D	L	GF	GA	GD	Win %
Eliteserien	16 April 2023	3 December 2023	Matchday 1	7th	30	13	3	14	37	35	+2	43.33
Norwegian Football Cup	24 May 2023	28 June 2023	First round	Fourth round	4	3	0	1	6	5	+1	75.00
Total					34	16	3	15	43	40	+3	47.06

Source: Soccerway

=== Eliteserien ===
==== League table ====
Pos	Team	Pld	W	D	L	GF	GA	GD	Pts	Qualification or relegation
5	Molde	30	15	6	9	65	39	+26	51	Qualification for the Europa League second qualifying round (Note: Molde qualified for the Europa League second qualifying round by winning the 2023 Norwegian Football Cup.)
6	Lillestrøm	30	13	4	13	49	49	0	43	
7	Strømsgodset	30	13	3	14	37	35	+2	42	
8	Sarpsborg	30	12	5	13	55	52	+3	41	
9	Rosenborg	30	11	6	13	46	50	−4	39	

Source: Football Association of Norway (in Norwegian)
Rules for classification: 1) Points; 2) Goal difference; 3) Goals scored; 4) Head-to-head points; 5) Head-to-head goal difference; 6) Head-to-head goals scored.

==== Results summary ====
Overall								Home						Away					
Pld	W	D	L	GF	GA	GD	Pts	W	D	L	GF	GA	GD	W	D	L	GF	GA	GD
30	13	3	14	37	35	+2	42	8	1	6	22	15	+7	5	2	8	15	20	−5

==== Results by round ====
Round	1	2	3	4	5	6	7	8	9	10	11	12	13	14	15	16	17	18	19	20	21	22	23	24	25	26	27	28	29	30
Ground	A	H	A	H	A	A	H	A	H	A	H	A	H	A	H	A	H	A	H	A	H	A	H	A	H	H	A	H	A	H
Result	L	W	L	L	D	L	W	D	L	W	W	W	W	L	L	L	L	W	L	L	W	L	D	L	W	W	W	L	W	W
Position	10	8	11	13	15	15	12	12	14	12	10	8	8	8	9	10	10	10	10	10	10	10	10	10	9	9	8	8	8	7

A = Away; H = Home; W = Win; D = Draw; L = Loss

==== Matches ====
The league fixtures were announced on 9 December 2022.

16 April 2023 2	Strømsgodset	1–0	Aalesund	Drammen
17:00 CEST (UTC+2)	Valsvik 42'	Report		Stadium: Marienlyst Stadion; Attendance: 5,014; Referee: Daniel Higraff

19 April 2023 1	Lillestrøm	4–3	Strømsgodset	Lillestrøm
18:30 CEST (UTC+2)	Garnås 23'; Lehne Olsen 25'; Åsen 84'; Adams 90+5'	Report	Jack 32'; Valsvik 39'; Mehnert 76'	Stadium: Åråsen Stadion; Attendance: 8,870; Referee: Tore Hansen

23 April 2023 3	HamKam	2–0	Strømsgodset	Hamar
17:00 CEST (UTC+2)	Udahl 75'; Kirkevold 89'	Report		Stadium: Briskeby Stadion; Attendance: 3,289; Referee: Steinar Hauge

30 April 2023 4	Strømsgodset	0–1	Tromsø	Drammen
17:00 CEST (UTC+2)		Report	Paintsil 73'	Stadium: Marienlyst Stadion; Attendance: 5,008; Referee: Svein Tore Sinnes

7 May 2023 5	Viking	1–1	Strømsgodset	Stavanger
17:00 CEST (UTC+2)	Bjarnason 89'	Report	Brunes 75'	Stadium: Viking Stadion; Attendance: 9,477; Referee: Tore Hansen

13 May 2023 6	Molde	3–2	Strømsgodset	Molde
17:00 CEST (UTC+2)	Linnes 37'; Mannsverk 67'; Breivik 77'	Report	Mehnert 61'; Brunes 90+6'	Stadium: Aker Stadion; Attendance: 6,423; Referee: Daniel Higraff

16 May 2023 7	Strømsgodset	1–0	Sandefjord	Drammen
18:00 CEST (UTC+2)	Hanssen 42'	Report		Stadium: Marienlyst Stadion; Attendance: 5,827; Referee: Marius Hansen Grøtta

29 May 2023 8	Odd	1–1	Strømsgodset	Skien
17:00 CEST (UTC+2)	Jevtović 60'	Report	Mehnert 61'	Stadium: Skagerak Arena; Attendance: 5,088; Referee: Jan Morten Tennøy

4 June 2023 9	Strømsgodset	1–2	Haugesund	Drammen
17:00 CEST (UTC+2)	Vilsvik 71'	Report	Therkildsen 18'; Diarra 75'	Stadium: Marienlyst Stadion; Attendance: 4,709; Referee: Marius Lien

11 June 2023 10	Vålerenga	0–1	Strømsgodset	Oslo
17:00 CEST (UTC+2)		Report	Stengel 68' (pen.)	Stadium: Intility Arena; Attendance: 7,578; Referee: Svein Tore Sinnes

25 June 2023 11	Strømsgodset	2–0	Bodø/Glimt	Drammen
19:15 CEST (UTC+2)	Brunes 45+2'; Gulliksen 90+5'	Report		Stadium: Marienlyst Stadion; Attendance: 6,766; Referee: Sigurd Smehus Kringstad

3 July 2023 12	Stabæk	0–1	Strømsgodset	Bærum
19:00 CEST (UTC+2)		Report	Leifsson 18'	Stadium: Nadderud Stadion; Attendance: 3,262; Referee: Daniel Higraff

9 July 2023 13	Strømsgodset	5–2	Sarpsborg 08	Drammen
17:00 CEST (UTC+2)	Brunes 4', 11'; Valsvik 23'; Stenevik 60'; Enersen 78'	Report	Torp 6'; Soltvedt 17'	Stadium: Marienlyst Stadion; Attendance: 5,129; Referee: Svein Tore Sinnes

16 July 2023 14	Brann	1–0	Strømsgodset	Bergen
19:15 CEST (UTC+2)	Wassberg 29'	Report		Stadium: Brann Stadion; Attendance: 13,051; Referee: Tore Hansen

23 July 2023 15	Strømsgodset	0–1	Rosenborg	Drammen
19:15 CEST (UTC+2)		Report	Nypan 22'	Stadium: Marienlyst Stadion; Attendance: 7,014; Referee: Kristoffer Hagenes

30 July 2023 16	Aalesund	1–0	Strømsgodset	Ålesund
17:00 CEST (UTC+2)	Kristensen 90+3'	Report		Stadium: Color Line Stadion; Attendance: 4,303; Referee: Jan Morten Tennøy

5 August 2023 17	Strømsgodset	1–3	Vålerenga	Drammen
18:00 CEST (UTC+2)	Brunes 8'	Report	Håkans 45+2'; Ofkir 50'; Jatta 77'	Stadium: Marienlyst Stadion; Attendance: 6,860; Referee: Marius Hansen Grøtta

12 August 2023 18	Sarpsborg 08	1–2	Strømsgodset	Sarpsborg
18:00 CEST (UTC+2)	Opseth 12'	Report	Stengel 63' (pen.); Andersen 84'	Stadium: Sarpsborg Stadion; Attendance: 4,138; Referee: Svein Oddvar Moen

20 August 2023 19	Strømsgodset	1–2	Lillestrøm	Drammen
19:15 CEST (UTC+2)	Melkersen 87'	Report	Ibrahimaj 34'; Lehne Olsen 49'	Stadium: Marienlyst Stadion; Attendance: 6,020; Referee: Sigurd Smehus Kringstad

3 September 2023 21	Strømsgodset	2–1	Stabæk	Drammen
17:00 CEST (UTC+2)	Stengel 17' (pen.); Valsvik 80'	Report	Wangberg 15'	Stadium: Marienlyst Stadion; Attendance: 5,149; Referee: Ajdin Medic

16 September 2023 22	Sandefjord	2–0	Strømsgodset	Sandefjord
18:00 CEST (UTC+2)	Nilsson 59'; Ottosson 89'	Report		Stadium: Release Arena; Attendance: 3,733; Referee: Sivert Øksnes Amland

24 September 2023 23	Strømsgodset	1–1	Molde	Drammen
17:00 CEST (UTC+2)	Melkersen 8'	Report	Eikrem 39'	Stadium: Marienlyst Stadion; Attendance: 4,737; Referee: Marius Lien

1 October 2023 20	Bodø/Glimt	2–0	Strømsgodset	Bodø
19:15 CEST (UTC+2)	Gulliksen 2'; Saltnes 60'	Report		Stadium: Aspmyra Stadion; Attendance: 5,927; Referee: Espen Eskås

8 October 2023 24	Haugesund	1–0	Strømsgodset	Haugesund
17:00 CEST (UTC+2)	Niyukuri 69'	Report		Stadium: Haugesund Stadion; Attendance: 4,236; Referee: Tore Hansen

22 October 2023 25	Strømsgodset	3–1	Odd	Drammen
17:00 CEST (UTC+2)	Andersen 63'; Stengel 69'; Melkersen 85'	Report	Tewelde 28'	Stadium: Marienlyst Stadion; Attendance: 4,634; Referee: Kristoffer Hagenes

29 October 2023 26	Strømsgodset	1–0	Viking	Drammen
17:00 CET (UTC+1)	Melkersen 29'	Report		Stadium: Marienlyst Stadion; Attendance: 4,860; Referee: Steinar Hauge

5 November 2023 27	Tromsø	0–1	Strømsgodset	Tromsø
19:15 CET (UTC+1)		Report	Farji 84'	Stadium: Romssa Arena; Attendance: 4,852; Referee: Svein Tore Sinnes

12 November 2023 28	Strømsgodset	0–1	HamKam	Drammen
17:00 CET (UTC+1)		Report	Tómasson 49' (o.g.)	Stadium: Marienlyst Stadion; Attendance: 4,385; Referee: Sigurd Smehus Kringstad

26 November 2023 29	Rosenborg	1–3	Strømsgodset	Trondheim
17:00 CET (UTC+1)	Nelson 28' (pen.)	Report	Mehnert 23'; Valsvik 72'; Tómasson 90+4'	Stadium: Lerkendal Stadion; Attendance: 11,404; Referee: Marius Lien

3 December 2023 30	Strømsgodset	3–0	Brann	Drammen
17:00 CET (UTC+1)	Vilsvik 23'; Stengel 65', 83'	Report		Stadium: Marienlyst Stadion; Attendance: 5,432; Referee: Ola Hobber Nilsen

=== Norwegian Football Cup ===
24 May 2023 First round	Heming	0–1 (a.e.t.)	Strømsgodset	Oslo
18:00 CEST (UTC+2)		Report	Brunes 100'	Stadium: Hemingbanen; Referee: André Bjørgen Birkeland

1 June 2023 Second round	Eik Tønsberg	1–2	Strømsgodset	Tønsberg
20:00 CEST (UTC+2)	Nygaard 37'	Report	Brunes 9', 69'	Stadium: Tønsberg Gressbane; Attendance: 2,670; Referee: Eivind Bodding

7 June 2023 Third round	Vard Haugesund	1–4	Strømsgodset	Haugesund
18:00 CEST	Jensen 10'	Report	Mehnert 7'; Gulliksen 52'; Brunes 83', 90'	Stadium: Haugesund Stadion; Attendance: 625; Referee: Steinar Hauge

28 June 2023 Fourth round	Molde	3–0	Strømsgodset	Molde
18:00 CEST (UTC+2)	Brynhildsen 1'; Kitolano 5'; Breivik 26' (pen.)	Report		Stadium: Aker Stadion; Attendance: 2,594; Referee: Svein Oddvar Moen
