= 2019 Strømsgodset Toppfotball season =

Strømsgodset
2019 season
- President: Trond Esaiassen
- Manager: Bjørn Petter Ingebretsen (Until 15 May); Håkon Wibe-Lund (interim) (15 May - 20 June); Henrik Pedersen (From 20 June)
- Stadium: Marienlyst Stadion
- Eliteserien: 11th
- Norwegian Cup: Third round
- Top goalscorer: League: Lars-Jørgen Salvesen (7); All: Lars-Jørgen Salvesen (7)
| Home colours | Away colours |

The 2019 season was Strømsgodset's thirteenth season back in Eliteserien since their promotion in the 2006 season.

== Squad ==
As of 22 August 2019

Note: Flags indicate national team as defined under FIFA eligibility rules; some limited exceptions apply. Players may hold more than one non-FIFA nationality.

| No. | Pos. | Nation | Player |
|---|---|---|---|
| 1 | GK | (Norway) NOR | Viljar Myhra |
| 2 | DF | (Norway) NOR | Mounir Hamoud |
| 3 | DF | (Norway) NOR | Jonathan Parr |
| 4 | DF | (Cameroon) CMR | Duplexe Tchamba (on loan from Strasbourg) |
| 5 | DF | (Norway) NOR | Jakob Glesnes |
| 6 | MF | (Norway) NOR | Henning Hauger |
| 7 | MF | (Norway) NOR | Herman Stengel |
| 8 | MF | (Norway) NOR | Johan Hove |
| 9 | FW | (Norway) NOR | Sebastian Pedersen |
| 10 | FW | (Norway) NOR | Moses Mawa |
| 11 | FW | (Norway) NOR | Kristoffer Tokstad |
| 14 | DF | (Norway) NOR | Nicholas Mickelson |
| 18 | MF | (Norway) NOR | Martin Rønning Ovenstad |

| No. | Pos. | Nation | Player |
|---|---|---|---|
| 20 | MF | (Denmark) DEN | Mikkel Maigaard |
| 22 | DF | (France) FRA | Prosper Mendy |
| 23 | MF | (Denmark) DEN | Martin Spelmann |
| 26 | DF | (Norway) NOR | Lars Christopher Vilsvik |
| 35 | GK | (Denmark) DEN | Martin Hansen |
| 36 | MF | (Norway) NOR | Hasan Duman |
| 39 | DF | (Norway) NOR | Lars Sætra |
| 42 | MF | (Nigeria) NGA | Jack Ipalibo (on loan from Villarreal C) |
| 53 | GK | (Norway) NOR | Matias Finnestrand |
| 56 | FW | (Norway) NOR | Mustapha Fofana |
| 77 | MF | (Norway) NOR | Muhamed Keita |
| 88 | FW | (Norway) NOR | Lars-Jørgen Salvesen |

=== Out on loan ===
Note: Flags indicate national team as defined under FIFA eligibility rules; some limited exceptions apply. Players may hold more than one non-FIFA nationality.

| No. | Pos. | Nation | Player |
|---|---|---|---|
| 17 | DF | (Norway) NOR | Christopher Lindquist (on loan at Kristiansund until 31 December 2019) |
| 19 | FW | (Norway) NOR | Halldor Stenevik (on loan at Sogndal until 31 December 2019) |
| 21 | MF | (Norway) NOR | Mathias Gjerstrøm (on loan at Kongsvinger until 31 December 2019) |
| 40 | GK | (Norway) NOR | Morten Sætra (on loan at Strømmen until 31 December 2019) |
| 63 | FW | (Norway) NOR | Magnus Lankhof Dahlby (on loan at Grorud until 31 July 2019) |

== Transfers ==
=== Winter ===
In: Note: Flags indicate national team as defined under FIFA eligibility rules; some limited exceptions apply. Players may hold more than one non-FIFA nationality.

| No. | Pos. | Nation | Player |
|---|---|---|---|
| 1 | GK | (Norway) NOR | Viljar Myhra (from (Norway) Odd) |
| 14 | MF | (Norway) NOR | Nicholas Mickelson (from (Norway) Ham-Kam) |
| 19 | MF | (Norway) NOR | Halldor Stenevik (from (Norway) Brann) |
| 23 | MF | (Denmark) DEN | Martin Spelmann (from (Denmark) AGF) |
| 25 | DF | (Norway) NOR | Stian Ringstad (loan return from (Norway) Sandefjord) |
| 29 | MF | (Mali) MLI | Yacouba Sylla (from (Belgium) Mechelen) |

Out: Note: Flags indicate national team as defined under FIFA eligibility rules; some limited exceptions apply. Players may hold more than one non-FIFA nationality.

| No. | Pos. | Nation | Player |
|---|---|---|---|
| 1 | GK | (Norway) NOR | Espen Bugge Pettersen (retired) |
| 4 | DF | (Norway) NOR | Kim André Madsen (to (Norway) Asker) |
| 17 | DF | (Norway) NOR | Christopher Lindquist (on loan to (Norway) Kristiansund) |
| 19 | MF | (Guinea-Bissau) GNB | Francisco Júnior (to (Denmark) Vendsyssel) |
| 20 | GK | (Norway) NOR | Pål Vestly Heigre (to (Norway) Sandnes Ulf) |
| 21 | MF | (Norway) NOR | Mathias Gjerstrøm (on loan to (Norway) Kongsvinger, previously on loan at (Norway) Notodden) |
| 23 | FW | (Norway) NOR | Eirik Ulland Andersen (to (Norway) Molde) |
| 35 | DF | (Norway) NOR | Arnar Thor Gudjonsson (on loan to (Norway) Fram Larvik) |
| 66 | MF | (Norway) NOR | Andreas Hoven (on loan to (Norway) Nest-Sotra) |
| 93 | FW | (Norway) NOR | Tokmac Nguen (to (Hungary) Ferencváros) |
| — | FW | (Norway) NOR | Simen Hammershaug (on loan to (Norway) Asker) |

=== Summer ===
In: Note: Flags indicate national team as defined under FIFA eligibility rules; some limited exceptions apply. Players may hold more than one non-FIFA nationality.

| No. | Pos. | Nation | Player |
|---|---|---|---|
| 4 | DF | (Cameroon) CMR | Duplexe Tchamba (on loan from (France) Strasbourg) |
| 10 | FW | (Norway) NOR | Moses Mawa (from (Norway) KFUM) |
| 17 | MF | (Norway) NOR | Tobias Fjeld Gulliksen (promoted from junior squad) |
| 21 | DF | (Denmark) DEN | Mikkel Maigaard (from (Norway) Raufoss) |
| 22 | MF | (France) FRA | Prosper Mendy (from (Spain) Badajoz) |
| 35 | GK | (Denmark) DEN | Martin Hansen (from (Switzerland) Basel) |
| 42 | MF | (Nigeria) NGA | Jack Ipalibo (on loan from (Spain) Villarreal C) |
| 56 | MF | (Norway) NOR | Mustapha Fofana (promoted from junior squad) |
| 88 | FW | (Norway) NOR | Lars Jørgen Salvesen (from (Norway) Sarpsborg 08) |

Out: Note: Flags indicate national team as defined under FIFA eligibility rules; some limited exceptions apply. Players may hold more than one non-FIFA nationality.

| No. | Pos. | Nation | Player |
|---|---|---|---|
| 9 | FW | (Norway) NOR | Sebastian Pedersen (on loan to (Norway) Florø) |
| 10 | FW | (Norway) NOR | Marcus Pedersen (released) |
| 19 | FW | (Norway) NOR | Halldor Stenevik (on loan to (Norway) Sogndal) |
| 25 | DF | (Norway) NOR | Stian Ringstad (to (Norway) Haugesund) |
| 29 | MF | (Mali) MLI | Yacouba Sylla (to (Romania) CFR Cluj) |
| 30 | FW | (Norway) NOR | Mostafa Abdellaoue (to (Norway) Sarpsborg 08) |
| 40 | GK | (Norway) NOR | Morten Sætra (on loan to (Norway) Strømmen) |
| 66 | MF | (Norway) NOR | Andreas Hoven (to (Norway) Sogndal, previously on loan to Nest-Sotra) |
| 80 | DF | (Norway) NOR | Andreas Nyhagen (on loan to (Norway) Grorud) |
| 90 | FW | (Norway) NOR | Amahl Pellegrino (to (Norway) Kristiansund) |

== Competitions ==
=== Eliteserien ===
==== Results summary ====
| Overall | | | | | | | | Home | | | | | | Away | | | | | |
| Pld | W | D | L | GF | GA | GD | Pts | W | D | L | GF | GA | GD | W | D | L | GF | GA | GD |
|---|---|---|---|---|---|---|---|---|---|---|---|---|---|---|---|---|---|---|---|
| 30 | 8 | 8 | 14 | 41 | 54 | −13 | 32 | 6 | 3 | 6 | 29 | 28 | +1 | 2 | 5 | 8 | 12 | 26 | −14 |

Last updated: 1 December 2019.
Source: see below

==== Results by round ====
| Round | 1 | 2 | 3 | 4 | 5 | 6 | 7 | 8 | 9 | 10 | 11 | 12 | 13 | 14 | 15 | 16 | 17 | 18 | 19 | 20 | 21 | 22 | 23 | 24 | 25 | 26 | 27 | 28 | 29 | 30 |
|---|---|---|---|---|---|---|---|---|---|---|---|---|---|---|---|---|---|---|---|---|---|---|---|---|---|---|---|---|---|---|
| Ground | H | A | H | A | H | A | H | A | H | A | A | H | A | H | A | H | H | A | H | A | H | A | H | A | H | A | H | A | H | A |
| Result | W | D | L | D | L | L | D | L | W | L | L | L | D | L | L | L | W | L | W | L | W | W | L | D | D | D | D | L | W | W |
| Position | 4 | 4 | 8 | 8 | 11 | 13 | 14 | 14 | 10 | 12 | 15 | 16 | 16 | 16 | 16 | 16 | 16 | 16 | 15 | 15 | 16 | 12 | 12 | 14 | 15 | 14 | 14 | 15 | 12 | 11 |

Updated to match(es) played on 1 December 2019. Source: see below
A = Away; H = Home; W = Win; D = Draw; L = Loss

==== Results ====
| 31 March 2019 1 | Strømsgodset | 3–2 | Haugesund | Drammen |
| 18:00 CEST (UTC+2) | Pedersen 2' (pen.); J. Hove 33'; Mos 71' | Report | Stølås 25'; Sandberg 43' | Stadium: Marienlyst Stadion; Attendance: 5,040; Referee: Ola Hobber Nilsen |

| 7 April 2019 2 | Brann | 1–1 | Strømsgodset | Bergen |
| 20:00 CEST (UTC+2) | Strand 53' | Report | Pellegrino 40' | Stadium: Brann Stadion; Attendance: 13,213; Referee: Trond Ivar Døvle |

| 12 April 2019 3 | Strømsgodset | 2–3 | Mjøndalen | Drammen |
| 19:00 CEST (UTC+2) | L. Sætra 11'; Mos 64' | Report | Solholm Johansen 9'; Semb Aasmundsen 19'; Occéan 41' | Stadium: Marienlyst Stadion; Attendance: 8,505; Referee: Dag Vidar Hafsås |

| 22 April 2019 4 | Rosenborg | 0–0 | Strømsgodset | Trondheim |
| 18:00 CEST (UTC+2) | | Report | | Stadium: Lerkendal Stadion; Attendance: 11,367; Referee: Trygve Kjensli |

| 28 April 2019 5 | Strømsgodset | 2–3 | Kristiansund | Drammen |
| 18:00 CEST (UTC+2) | Hopmark 61' (o.g.); Pellegrino 63' | Report | Kastrati 6', 30' (pen.); Kalludra 71' | Stadium: Marienlyst Stadion; Attendance: 4,875; Referee: Espen Eskås |

| 5 May 2019 6 | Odd | 2–1 | Strømsgodset | Skien |
| 18:00 CEST (UTC+2) | Hagen 24'; Børven 90+3' | Report | Mos 77' | Stadium: Skagerak Arena; Attendance: 5,252; Referee: Trond Ivar Døvle |

| 13 May 2019 7 | Strømsgodset | 0–0 | Viking | Drammen |
| 19:00 CEST (UTC+2) | | Report | | Stadium: Marienlyst Stadion; Attendance: 4,576; Referee: Sigurd Smehus Kringstad |

| 16 May 2019 8 | Vålerenga | 2–0 | Strømsgodset | Oslo |
| 20:00 CEST (UTC+2) | Dønnum 26'; Shala 67' | Report | | Stadium: Intility Arena; Attendance: 10,780; Referee: Tom Harald Hagen |

| 19 May 2019 9 | Strømsgodset | 3–1 | Tromsø | Drammen |
| 18:00 CEST (UTC+2) | Sylla 25'; Ovenstad 48'; J. Hove 90+5' | Report | Antonsen 23' | Stadium: Marienlyst Stadion; Attendance: 4,628; Referee: Trygve Kjensli |

| 26 May 2019 10 | Ranheim | 1–0 | Strømsgodset | Trondheim |
| 18:00 CEST (UTC+2) | Karlsen 10' | Report | | Stadium: EXTRA Arena; Attendance: 1,766; Referee: Ola Hobber Nilsen |

| 16 June 2019 11 | Bodø/Glimt | 2–0 | Strømsgodset | Bodø |
| 18:00 CEST (UTC+2) | Evjen 64'; Glesnes 68' (o.g.) | Report | | Stadium: Aspmyra Stadion; Attendance: 3,061; Referee: Kristoffer Hagenes |

| 22 June 2019 12 | Strømsgodset | 0–4 | Molde | Drammen |
| 18:00 CEST (UTC+2) | | Report | Ellingsen 9'; James 15', 25', 29' | Stadium: Marienlyst Stadion; Attendance: 5,313; Referee: Ola Hobber Nilsen |

| 1 July 2019 13 | Sarpsborg 08 | 2–2 | Strømsgodset | Sarpsborg |
| 19:00 CEST (UTC+2) | Halvorsen 49'; Strand Larsen 63' | Report | Bateau 29' (o.g.); Tokstad 71' | Stadium: Sarpsborg Stadion; Attendance: 5,443; Referee: Tore Hansen |

| 5 July 2019 14 | Strømsgodset | 0–2 | Stabæk | Drammen |
| 19:00 CEST (UTC+2) | | Report | Brynhildsen 14'; Kassi 81' | Stadium: Marienlyst Stadion; Attendance: 5,078; Referee: Tommy Skjerven |

| 14 July 2019 15 | Lillestrøm | 2–1 | Strømsgodset | Lillestrøm |
| 20:00 CEST (UTC+2) | Smárason 42', 45' | Report | Tokstad 73' | Stadium: Åråsen Stadion; Attendance: 4,337; Referee: Svein Oddvar Moen |

| 5 August 2019 16 | Strømsgodset | 1–3 | Bodø/Glimt | Drammen |
| 19:00 CEST (UTC+2) | Mawa 90+1' | Report | Evjen 44', 58'; Layouni 90+4' | Stadium: Marienlyst Stadion; Attendance: 4,943; Referee: Espen Eskås |

| 11 August 2019 17 | Strømsgodset | 3–2 | Vålerenga | Drammen |
| 20:00 CEST (UTC+2) | Vilsvik 39'; Keita 49', 62' | Report | Dønnum 51'; Lædre Bjørdal 71' | Stadium: Marienlyst Stadion; Attendance: 5,318; Referee: Tommy Skjerven |

| 18 August 2019 18 | Viking | 4–0 | Strømsgodset | Stavanger |
| 20:00 CEST (UTC+2) | Torsteinbø 7'; Høiland 37' (pen.), 77'; Pereira 83' | Report | | Stadium: Viking Stadion; Attendance: 6,822; Referee: Kristoffer Hagenes |

| 25 August 2019 19 | Strømsgodset | 2–1 | Sarpsborg 08 | Drammen |
| 20:00 CEST (UTC+2) | Maigaard 60'; Salvesen 68' | Report | Zachariassen 46' | Stadium: Marienlyst Stadion; Attendance: 4,855; Referee: Dag Vidar Hafsås |

| 31 August 2019 20 | Stabæk | 2–1 | Strømsgodset | Bærum |
| 18:00 CEST (UTC+2) | Brynhildsen 5'; Kassi 86' | Report | Salvesen 81' | Stadium: Nadderud Stadion; Attendance: 3,674; Referee: Kristoffer Hagenes |

| 15 September 2019 21 | Strømsgodset | 1–0 | Ranheim | Drammen |
| 18:00 CEST (UTC+2) | Mawa 56' | Report | | Stadium: Marienlyst Stadion; Attendance: 4,913; Referee: Ola Hobber Nilsen |

| 22 September 2019 22 | Tromsø | 0–1 | Strømsgodset | Tromsø |
| 18:00 CEST (UTC+2) | | Report | Maigaard 86' | Stadium: Alfheim Stadion; Attendance: 2,943; Referee: Kai Erik Steen |

| 29 September 2019 23 | Strømsgodset | 2–3 | Odd | Drammen |
| 18:00 CEST (UTC+2) | Mendy 16'; Fofana 84' | Report | Delaveris 11'; Hoff 27'; Børven 66' | Stadium: Marienlyst Stadion; Attendance: 5,001; Referee: Tom Harald Hagen |

| 4 October 2019 24 | Mjøndalen | 1–1 | Strømsgodset | Mjøndalen |
| 19:00 CEST (UTC+2) | Brustad 52' | Report | Salvesen 66' | Stadium: Consto Arena; Attendance: 3,350; Referee: Svein Oddvar Moen |

| 20 October 2019 25 | Strømsgodset | 1–1 | Lillestrøm | Drammen |
| 18:00 CEST (UTC+2) | Mawa 46' | Report | Lehne Olsen 71' | Stadium: Marienlyst Stadion; Attendance: 5,604; Referee: Tore Hansen |

| 27 October 2019 26 | Haugesund | 2–2 | Strømsgodset | Haugesund |
| 18:00 CET (UTC+1) | Sandberg 28'; Grindheim 66' | Report | Salvesen 7', 32' | Stadium: Haugesund Stadion; Attendance: 3,465; Referee: Trygve Kjensli |

| 1 November 2019 27 | Strømsgodset | 3–3 | Rosenborg | Drammen |
| 19:00 CET (UTC+1) | Maigaard 20' (pen.); Keita 53'; Sætra 90+1' | Report | Hovland 16'; Jensen 73' (pen.); Glesnes 88' (o.g.) | Stadium: Marienlyst Stadion; Attendance: 5,457; Referee: Svein Oddvar Moen |

| 10 November 2019 28 | Molde | 4–0 | Strømsgodset | Molde |
| 18:00 CET (UTC+1) | Omoijuanfo 19'; Wolff Eikrem 34'; James 74', 81' | Report | | Stadium: Aker Stadion; Attendance: 7,098; Referee: Kristoffer Hagenes |

| 24 November 2019 29 | Strømsgodset | 6–0 | Brann | Drammen |
| 18:00 CET (UTC+1) | Mawa 21'; Salvesen 37', 43'; Tchamba 39'; Tokstad 48'; Stengel 66' | Report | | Stadium: Marienlyst Stadion; Attendance: 5,352; Referee: Svein Oddvar Moen |

| 1 December 2019 30 | Kristiansund | 1–2 | Strømsgodset | Kristiansund |
| 18:00 CET (UTC+1) | Sørli 45+2' | Report | Maigaard 19'; Tchamba 55' | Stadium: Kristiansund Stadion; Attendance: 4,106; Referee: Ola Hobber Nilsen |

==== Table ====
| Pos | Team | Pld | W | D | L | GF | GA | GD | Pts |
|---|---|---|---|---|---|---|---|---|---|
| 9 | Brann | 30 | 10 | 10 | 10 | 32 | 37 | −5 | 40 |
| 10 | Vålerenga | 30 | 8 | 10 | 12 | 39 | 44 | −5 | 34 |
| 11 | Strømsgodset | 30 | 8 | 8 | 14 | 41 | 54 | −13 | 32 |
| 12 | Sarpsborg 08 | 30 | 5 | 15 | 10 | 30 | 40 | −10 | 30 |
| 13 | Mjøndalen | 30 | 6 | 12 | 12 | 38 | 52 | −14 | 30 |

Source: Football Association of Norway (in Norwegian), Soccerway
Rules for classification: 1) Points; 2) Goal difference; 3) Goals scored; 4) Head-to-head points; 5) Head-to-head goal difference; 6) Head-to-head away goals scored (only if between two teams); 7) Head-to-head goals scored; 8) Play-off (only used to decide champions or relegation).

=== Norwegian Cup ===
| 1 May 2019 First Round | Flint | 0–7 | Strømsgodset | Tønsberg |
| 18:00 CEST (UTC+2) | | Report | Ringstad 30'; Mos 54'; Rønning Ovenstad 75', 89'; Pedersen 85', 90'; Pellegrino 89' | Stadium: Flint ESSO Arena; Referee: Henrik Andreas Grenå Pettersen |

| 23 May 2019 Second Round | Ullern | 0–1 | Strømsgodset | Oslo |
| 18:00 CEST (UTC+2) | | Report | Hamoud 37' | Stadium: Ullern Kunstgress; Referee: Ola Kellerhals |

| 19 June 2019 Third Round | Fram Larvik | 2–1 | Strømsgodset | Larvik |
| 18:00 CEST (UTC+2) | Hamoud 38' (o.g); Osestad 82' (pen.) | Report | Pellegrino 6' | Stadium: Framparken; Attendance: 1,743; Referee: Svein Tore Sinnes |
