= Halldor Stenevik =

Norwegian footballer (born 2000)

Personal information
- Full name: Halldor Østervold Stenevik
- Date of birth: 2 February 2000 (age 26)
- Place of birth: Austevoll Municipality, Norway
- Height: 1.85 m (6 ft 1 in)
- Position: Midfielder

Team information
- Current team: Molde
- Number: 18

Senior career*
Years	Team	Apps	(Gls)
2015	Fyllingsdalen		
2016–2018	Brann	2	(0)
2017–2018	→ Nest-Sotra (loan)	20	(3)
2019–2023	Strømsgodset	103	(3)
2019	→ Sogndal (loan)	1	(0)
2024–	Molde	50	(5)

International career^{‡}
2015	Norway U15	2	(1)
2016	Norway U16	20	(3)
2017	Norway U17	8	(2)
2018	Norway U18	10	(0)
2019	Norway U19	6	(0)
2022-2023	Norway U21	3	(0)
- * Club domestic league appearances and goals as of 1 December 2025 ‡ National team caps and goals as of 22 February 2024

Halldor Østervold Stenevik (born 2 February 2000) is a Norwegian footballer who plays for Molde.

He formerly played for Fyllingsdalen, Brann and Nest-Sotra.

== National team ==
He was selected for the Norwegian U17 national team's squad for the U17 European Championship in Croatia in 2017.

He was called up to the Norwegian squad for the U19 European Championship in Armenia in 2019.

== Career statistics ==
As of 25 August 2025

Appearances and goals by club, season and competition
Club	Season	League			National cup		Europe		Total	
Club	Season	Division	Apps	Goals	Apps	Goals	Apps	Goals	Apps	Goals
Brann	2016	Eliteserien	2	0	0	0	—		2	0
Brann	2017	Eliteserien	0	0	2	1	—		2	1
Brann	Total		2	0	2	1	—		4	1
Nest-Sotra (loan)	2017	2. divisjon	11	1	0	0	—		11	1
Nest-Sotra (loan)	2018	1. divisjon	9	2	3	0	—		12	2
Nest-Sotra (loan)	Total		20	3	3	0	—		23	3
Strømsgodset	2019	Eliteserien	3	0	2	0	—		5	0
Strømsgodset	2020	Eliteserien	22	0	—		—		22	0
Strømsgodset	2021	Eliteserien	29	2	2	1	—		31	3
Strømsgodset	2022	Eliteserien	27	0	2	0	—		29	0
Strømsgodset	2023	Eliteserien	22	1	1	0	—		23	1
Strømsgodset	Total		103	3	7	1	—		110	4
Sogndal (loan)	2019	1. divisjon	1	0	0	0	—		1	0
Molde	2024	Eliteserien	26	3	6	0	15 (Note: Appearances in UEFA Europa Conference League)	1	47	4
Molde	2025	Eliteserien	17	1	4	0	0	0	21	1
Molde	Total		43	4	10	0	15	1	68	5
Career total			169	10	22	2	15	1	206	13
