= Nicholas Mickelson =

Thai footballer (born 1999)

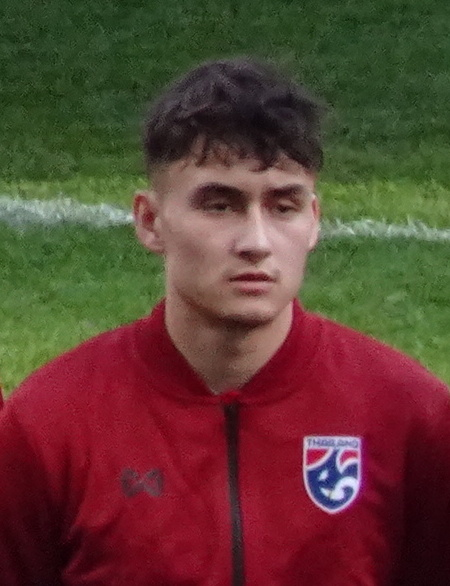
- Mickelson with Thailand in 2024

Personal information
- Full name: Look Saa Nicholas Kengkhetkid Mickelson
- Date of birth: 24 July 1999 (age 27)
- Place of birth: Skien, Norway
- Height: 1.79 m (5 ft 10 in)
- Positions: Left-back; right-back

Team information
- Current team: SV Elversberg
- Number: 2

Youth career
- Ottestad
- 2014–2015: HamKam

Senior career*
Years	Team	Apps	(Gls)
2015–2018	HamKam	54	(0)
2019–2021	Strømsgodset	29	(0)
2021–2025	OB	95	(2)
2025–	SV Elversberg	30	(1)

International career^{‡}
2015	Norway U16	3	(0)
2016	Norway U17	2	(0)
2017	Norway U18	8	(0)
2018	Norway U19	5	(0)
2019	Norway U20	2	(0)
2018–2020	Norway U21	5	(1)
2022	Thailand U23	3	(0)
2023–	Thailand	36	(2)
Medal record
Men's football
Representing Thailand
FIFA ASEAN Cup
Runner-up	2026 Indonesia	Team
ASEAN Championship
Runner-up	ASEAN 2024	Team
- * Club domestic league appearances and goals as of 22:30, 30 October 2026 (UTC) ‡ National team caps and goals as of 5 October 2026

Look Saa Nicholas Kengkhetkid Mickelson (Thai: ลูกโซ่ นิโคลัส เก่งเขตกิจ มิคเคลสัน; born 24 July 1999) is a professional footballer who plays as a right-back for Bundesliga club SV Elversberg. Born in Norway, he plays for the Thailand national team.

== Club career ==
Nicholas Mickelson began his professional career at Hamarkameratene. On 23 May 2015, He made the first-team debut as a substitute in the Norwegian Second Division match against Molde 2. Mickelson joined the Norwegian top-flight club Strømsgodset on 1 January 2019.

On 30 August 2021, Danish Superliga club Odense BK confirmed that Mickelson would join the club on 1 January 2022 on a free agent, when his contract with Norwegian club, Strømsgodset expired. Mickelson signed a pre-contract until June 2025. However, on 31 August 2021 OB confirmed, that Mickelson would instead join the club with immediate effect. He made 102 appearances for Odense BK.

In July 2025, Mickelson signed a two-year contract with German club SV Elversberg. He made his 2. Bundesliga debut for SV Elversberg as an 81st-minute substitute in their third match of the season against 1. FC Kaiserslautern. Mickelson made his first start in the 4–0 win against 1. FC Magdeburg on 5 October 2025, providing the assist for the first goal by Bambasé Conté in the 23rd minute. On 14 February 2026, he scored his first goal for the club in the 2-1 win against Dynamo Dresden. During his first season with Elversberg, Mickelson made 25 league appearances as the club finished second in the league and won promotion to the Bundesliga.

== International career ==
=== Youth ===
Mickelson represented Norway at the youth levels. He was part of the Norway Under-19 squad at the 2018 UEFA European Under-19 Championship in Finland. He was called up for the Norway Under-20 squad for the 2019 FIFA U-20 World Cup, but had to withdraw from the squad due to an Achilles tendon injury.

On 26 May 2022, Mickelson was called up to the Thailand under-23 for the 2022 AFC U-23 Asian Cup.

=== Senior ===
On 25 March 2023, Mickelson made his debut for the senior team in a friendly match against Syria at the Shabab Al Ahli Stadium in Dubai. On 10 September 2023, Mickelson scored his first senior international goal in a 2–2 draw against Iraq in the final of a friendly tournament, 2023 King's Cup at the 700th Anniversary Stadium.

In November 2024, he was selected in the Thailand squad for the 2024 ASEAN Championship.

== Personal life ==
Mickelson was born in Skien, Norway to a Norwegian father and a Thai mother from Phitsanulok.

== Career statistics ==
=== Club ===
As of match played 30 October 2026

Appearances and goals by club, season and competition
Club	Season	League			National cup (Note: Includes Norwegian Cup, Danish Cup, DFB-Pokal)		Other		Total	
Club	Season	Division	Apps	Goals	Apps	Goals	Apps	Goals	Apps	Goals
HamKam	2015	Norwegian Second Division	5	0	0	0	0	0	5	0
HamKam	2016	Norwegian Second Division	10	0	0	0	0	0	10	0
HamKam	2017	Norwegian Second Division	22	0	1	0	0	0	23	0
HamKam	2018	Norwegian First Division	17	0	0	0	0	0	17	0
HamKam	Total		54	0	1	0	0	0	55	0
Strømsgodset	2019	Eliteserien	3	0	1	0	0	0	4	0
Strømsgodset	2020	Eliteserien	22	0	0	0	0	0	22	0
Strømsgodset	2021	Eliteserien	4	0	0	0	0	0	4	0
Strømsgodset	Total		29	0	1	0	0	0	30	0
OB	2021–22	Danish Superliga	24	0	7	0	0	0	31	0
OB	2022–23	Danish Superliga	17	0	0	0	0	0	17	0
OB	2023–24	Danish Superliga	22	2	1	0	0	0	23	2
OB	2024–25	Danish 1st Division	31	0	0	0	0	0	31	0
OB	Total		94	2	8	0	0	0	102	2
SV Elversberg	2025–26	2. Bundesliga	25	1	1	0	—		26	1
SV Elversberg	2026–27	Bundesliga	4	0	1	0	—		5	0
SV Elversberg	Total		29	1	2	0	—		31	1
Career total			207	3	12	0	0	0	219	3

=== International ===
As of match played 5 October 2026

Appearances and goals by national team and year
National team	Year	Apps	Goals
Thailand	2023	6	1
Thailand	2024	15	1
Thailand	2025	10	0
Thailand	2026	5	0
Total		36	2

Scores and results list Thailand's goal tally first, score column indicates score after each Mickelson goal.

List of international goals scored by Nicholas Mickelson
No.	Date	Venue	Opponent	Score	Result	Competition
1	10 September 2023	700th Anniversary Stadium, Chiang Mai, Thailand	Iraq	1–1	2–2 (4–5 p)	2023 King's Cup
2	8 December 2024	Hàng Đẫy Stadium, Hanoi, Vietnam	Timor-Leste	10–0	10–0	2024 ASEAN Championship

== Honours ==
OB

- Danish 1st Division: 2024–25

Thailand

- King's Cup: 2024,2026 , runner-up: 2023
- ASEAN Championship: Runner-up (2024)
- FIFA ASEAN Cup: Runner-up 2026

Individual

- ASEAN Championship Best XI: 2024
