= Marcus Mølvadgaard =

Danish footballer (born 1999)

Personal information
- Date of birth: 3 August 1999 (age 27)
- Place of birth: Langå, Denmark
- Height: 1.89 m (6 ft 2 in)
- Position: Forward

Team information
- Current team: Locri
- Number: 99

Youth career
- Langaa IK
- 2012–2017: Randers

Senior career*
Years	Team	Apps	(Gls)
2016–2019	Randers	26	(2)
2019	→ Hvidovre (loan)	12	(1)
2020	Strømsgodset	18	(1)
2021–2022	Košice	23	(9)
2022–2023	Penafiel	6	(0)
2023–2024	Næstved	31	(2)
2024	Palmese		
2025–	Locri	10	(2)

International career
2014	Denmark U16	2	(0)
2016	Denmark U18	3	(0)
- * Club domestic league appearances and goals as of 22:12, 31 May 2025 (UTC)

Marcus Mølvadgaard (born 3 August 1999) is a Danish professional footballer who plays as a forward for Serie D club Locri.

== Club career ==
=== Randers FC ===
In May 2015, Mølvadgaard went on a trial at German club 1. FSV Mainz 05 for one week, though without earning any contract.

Mølvadgaard got his debut for Randers FC on 5 August 2016. He started on the bench, but replaced Viktor Lundberg in the 82nd minute in a 1–0 victory against AC Horsens in the Danish Superliga.

On 15 November 2016 it was confirmed, that Mølvadgaard had signed a new 2-year full-professional contract with RFC, and was permanently moved up to the first team squad, starting from new year 2017.

On 31 January 2019, Mølvadgaard was loaned out to Danish 1st Division club Hvidovre IF for the rest of the season.

In July 2019, the sporting director of Randers announced to the medias, that Mølvadgaard wouldn't play for the club anymore and had to find a new club because his contract would expire within six months.

=== Strømsgodset ===
After a week on trial, Mølvadgaard signed a contract until the end of 2022 with Strømsgodset on 4 February 2020. However, he left the club at the end of 2020.

In an interview in April 2021, Mølvadgaard revealed that he had lost the desire to play football under the management of Strømsgodset manager Henrik Pedersen and would take a break from football. Mølvadgaard stated in the interview, among other things the following: "I think it's so fantastic that Henrik Pedersen is no longer the coach of Strømsgodset. Because it's a man who's ruined a whole year of my life as a football player".

=== Košice ===
On 9 July 2021, Mølvadgaard joined Slovak club FC Košice on a three-year deal. However, after the club failed to win promotion to Fortuna Liga, it was announced that Mølvadgaard would depart at the end of the season.

=== Penafiel ===
On 1 August 2022 it was confirmed, that Mølvadgaard had joined Liga Portugal 2 club Penafiel, signing a three-year deal. On 31 January 2023 the club confirmed, that Mølvadgaard's contract had been terminated by mutual consent.

=== Næstved ===
Later on the same day as Mølvadgaard left Penafiel, he signed with Danish 1st Division club Næstved.

On September 18, 2024, Næstved confirmed that they had terminated Mølvadgaard's contract by mutual consent.

=== Italian clubs ===
In October 2025, Mølvadgaard joined Italian Eccellenza side Palmese. Two months later, in the beginning of December 2024, he terminated his contract with the club.

On 27 January 2025, he moved to Locri.
