= Kreshnik Krasniqi =

Kosovan-Norwegian footballer (born 2000)

Personal information
- Date of birth: 22 December 2000 (age 25)
- Place of birth: Hønefoss, Norway
- Height: 1.83 m (6 ft 0 in)
- Position: Midfielder

Team information
- Current team: Strømsgodset
- Number: 8

Youth career
- 2013–2015: Hønefoss
- 2016–2019: Strømsgodset

Senior career*
Years	Team	Apps	(Gls)
2015	Hønefoss 2	8	(1)
2015	Hønefoss	1	(0)
2016–2017	Strømsgodset 3	18	(1)
2016–2019	Strømsgodset 2	36	(6)
2020–	Strømsgodset	127	(6)

International career^{‡}
2016	Norway U16	5	(1)
2018	Kosovo U19	3	(0)
2019–2022	Kosovo U21	11	(1)
- * Club domestic league appearances and goals as of 14 November 2026 ‡ National team caps and goals as of 6 May 2023

Kreshnik Krasniqi (born 22 December 2000) is a professional footballer who plays as a midfielder for Norwegian club Strømsgodset. Born in Norway, he has represented that nation and Kosovo at youth international levels.

== Club career ==
=== Hønefoss ===
On 25 May 2015, Krasniqi made his debut with his hometown club Hønefoss in a 1–3 away win against Nest-Sotra after coming on as a substitute at 86th minute in place of Kevin Beugré.

=== Strømsgodset ===
On 17 June 2020, Krasniqi was named as a Strømsgodset substitute for the first time in a Eliteserien match against IK Start. His debut with Strømsgodset came four days later in a 1–0 home win against Odd after coming on as a substitute at 65th minute in place of Ipalibo Jack.

== International career ==
=== Norway ===
==== Under-16 ====
In January 2016, Krasniqi was named as part of the Norway U16 squad for 2016 Mercedes-Benz Aegean Cup. On 18 January 2016, he made his debut with Norway U16 in 2016 Mercedes-Benz Aegean Cup group stage match against Czech Republic U16 after being named in the starting line-up.

=== Kosovo ===
==== Under-19 ====
On 2 October 2018, Krasniqi was named as part of the Kosovo U19 squad for 2019 UEFA European Under-19 Championship qualifications. On 10 October 2018, he made his debut with Kosovo U19 in 2019 UEFA European Under-19 Championship qualifications match against Austria U19 after being named in the starting line-up.

==== Under-21 ====
On 27 May 2019, Krasniqi received a call-up from Kosovo U21 for 2021 UEFA European Under-21 Championship qualification matches against Andorra U21 and Turkey U21. On 6 June 2019, he made his debut with Kosovo U21 in 2021 UEFA European Under-21 Championship qualification match against Andorra U21 after coming on as a substitute at 83rd minute in place of Kreshnik Hajrizi.

== Personal life ==
Krasniqi was born in Hønefoss, Norway to Kosovo Albanian parents from Gjakova.

== Career statistics ==
=== Club ===
As of 14 November 2026

Club	Season	League			Cup		Other		Total	
Club	Season	Division	Apps	Goals	Apps	Goals	Apps	Goals	Apps	Goals
Hønefoss	2015	OBOS-ligaen	1	0	0	0	8 (Note: Appearance with Hønefoss II)	1	9	1
Strømsgodset III	2016	3. divisjon	17	1	0	0	1 (Note: Appearance with Strømsgodset II)	0	17	1
Strømsgodset II	2017	3. divisjon	4	1	0	0	1 (Note: Appearance with Strømsgodset III)	0	5	1
Strømsgodset II	2018	3. divisjon	19	4	0	0	—		19	4
Strømsgodset II	2019	3. divisjon	12	1	0	0	—		12	1
Strømsgodset	2020	Eliteserien	5	0	0	0	—		5	0
Strømsgodset	2021	Eliteserien	20	1	3	0	—		23	1
Strømsgodset	2022	Eliteserien	10	0	4	4	—		14	4
Strømsgodset	2023	Eliteserien	21	0	2	0	—		23	0
Strømsgodset	2024	Eliteserien	22	0	2	1	—		24	1
Strømsgodset	2025	Eliteserien	21	2	2	0	—		23	2
Strømsgodset	2026	Norwegian First Division	28	3	1	0	—		29	3
Career total			180	13	12	5	10	1	202	19
