= Valdimar Þór Ingimundarson =

Icelandic footballer (born 1999)

Personal information
- Date of birth: 28 April 1999 (age 27)
- Place of birth: Akranes, Iceland
- Height: 1.83 m (6 ft 0 in)
- Position: Midfielder

Team information
- Current team: Víkingur Reykjavík
- Number: 25

Youth career
- 2004-2015: Fylkir

Senior career*
Years	Team	Apps	(Gls)
2016–2020	Fylkir	71	(20)
2020–2021	Strømsgodset	26	(2)
2022–2023	Sogndal	56	(14)
2024–	Víkingur Reykjavík	76	(26)

International career^{‡}
2019–2021	Iceland U21	11	(1)
2022–	Iceland	2	(0)
- * Club domestic league appearances and goals as of 1 November 2026 ‡ National team caps and goals as of 14 March 2022

Valdimar Þór Ingimundarson (born 28 April 1999) is an Icelandic football midfielder who plays for Víkingur Reykjavík and the Iceland national team.

Valdimar Þór has been capped six times for Iceland U21.

== Career statistics ==
=== Club ===
As of 14 August 2024

Appearances and goals by club, season and competition
Club	Season	League			National Cup		Continental		Other		Total	
Club	Season	Division	Apps	Goals	Apps	Goals	Apps	Goals	Apps	Goals	Apps	Goals
Fylkir	2016	Besta deild karla	3	1	1	0	—		—		4	1
Fylkir	2017	1. deild karla	18	3	3	0	—		—		21	3
Fylkir	2018	Besta deild karla	15	2	1	0	—		—		16	2
Fylkir	2019	Besta deild karla	21	6	3	3	—		—		24	9
Fylkir	2020	Besta deild karla	14	8	1	0	—		—		15	8
Fylkir	Total		71	20	9	3	—		—		80	23
Strømsgodset	2020	Eliteserien	11	2	—		—		—		11	2
Strømsgodset	2021	Eliteserien	15	0	1	0	—		—		16	0
Strømsgodset	Total		26	2	1	0	—		—		27	2
Sogndal	2022	1. divisjon	29	7	2	0	—		—		31	7
Sogndal	2023	1. divisjon	27	7	2	0	—		—		29	7
Sogndal	Total		56	14	4	0	—		—		60	14
Víkingur Reykjavík	2024	Besta deild karla	17	5	4	2	5 (Note: Two appearances in UEFA Champions League, Three appearances, one goal in UEFA Europa Conference League)	1	1 (Note: Appearance(s) in Icelandic Super Cup)	0	27	8
Career Total			170	41	18	5	5	1	1	0	194	47

== Honours ==
Individual

- Norwegian First Division Player of the Month: July 2023
