= Aleksander Biermann Stenseth =

Norwegian footballer (born 2000)

Personal information
- Date of birth: 22 July 2000 (age 26)
- Height: 1.86 m (6 ft 1 in)
- Position: Midfielder

Youth career
- –2014: Klemetsrud
- 2015–2017: Skeid
- 2018–2020: Strømsgodset

Senior career*
Years	Team	Apps	(Gls)
2020–2022	Strømsgodset	6	(0)
- * Club domestic league appearances and goals as of 13 November 2022

Aleksander Biermann Stenseth (born 22 July 2000) is a Norwegian football midfielder.

A youth product of Klemetsrud and Skeid, he joined the junior team of Strømsgodset in 2018. He signed a professional contract with Strømsgodset in the summer of 2020. He made his Eliteserien debut in September 2020 against Sandefjord.
