= Andreas Rosendal Nyhagen =

Norwegian footballer (born 1998)

Personal information
- Date of birth: 4 November 1998 (age 28)
- Height: 1.81 m (5 ft 11 in)
- Position: Defender

Team information
- Current team: Sandnes Ulf
- Number: 17

Youth career
- –2015: Valdres
- 2017–2018: Strømsgodset

Senior career*
Years	Team	Apps	(Gls)
2015–2017	Valdres	41	(4)
2019–2021	Strømsgodset	7	(0)
2019	→ Grorud (loan)	6	(0)
2020	→ Moss (loan)	0	(0)
2022–2023	Ull/Kisa	47	(4)
2024–	Sandnes Ulf	70	(9)
- * Club domestic league appearances and goals as of 14 November 2026

Andreas Rosendal Nyhagen (born 4 November 1998) is a Norwegian football defender who plays for Sandnes Ulf.

A youth product of Valdres FK, he played for the senior team from 2015 to 2017. In mid-2017 he transferred to the junior team of Strømsgodset. He made his senior debut in the 2019 Norwegian Football Cup. In the autumn of 2019 he was loaned out to Grorud IL in the 2019 2. divisjon.

In 2020 he was loaned out to Moss FK, but the 2020 2. divisjon was postponed due to the COVID-19 pandemic, and Nyhagen was recalled in June 2020 to bolster the Strømsgodset squad instead. He made his Eliteserien debut in October 2020 against Molde. Released after the 2021 season, he moved to Ull/Kisa.
