= Ari Leifsson =

Icelandic footballer

Personal information
- Date of birth: 19 April 1998 (age 28)
- Place of birth: Reykjavík, Iceland
- Height: 1.93 m (6 ft 4 in)
- Position: Centre-back

Team information
- Current team: Stjarnan
- Number: 19

Youth career
- Fylkir

Senior career*
Years	Team	Apps	(Gls)
2015–2019	Fylkir	55	(0)
2020–2023	Strømsgodset	62	(2)
2024–2026	Kolding IF	33	(0)
2026–	Stjarnan	9	(0)

International career^{‡}
2017–2021	Iceland U21	20	(1)
2020–	Iceland	4	(0)
- * Club domestic league appearances and goals as of 16 November 2026 ‡ National team caps and goals as of 10 June 2022

Ari Leifsson (born 19 April 1998) is an Icelandic footballer who plays as a centre-back for Stjarnan and the Iceland national team.

== Career ==
Ari made his international debut for Iceland on 19 January 2020 in a friendly match against El Salvador, which finished as a 1–0 win.

On February 2, 2024, Leifsson switched to Danish 1st Division side Kolding IF, where he signed a deal until June 2026.

== Career statistics ==
=== International ===
As of 10 June 2022

Iceland
Year	Apps	Goals
2020	1	0
2022	3	0
Total	4	0
