= Niklas Gunnarsson =

Norwegian footballer (born 1991)

Personal information
- Date of birth: 27 April 1991 (age 35)
- Place of birth: Tønsberg, Norway
- Height: 1.88 m (6 ft 2 in)
- Position: Defender

Team information
- Current team: Xamax
- Number: 5

Youth career
- Pors
- Walsall
- Odd

Senior career*
Years	Team	Apps	(Gls)
2012–2013	Odd	48	(3)
2014–2016	Vålerenga	41	(4)
2015	→ Elfsborg (loan)	11	(1)
2016	→ Hibernian (loan)	15	(2)
2016–2018	Djurgårdens IF	55	(2)
2019	Palermo	0	(0)
2019	Sarpsborg 08	10	(0)
2020–2023	Strømsgodset	67	(0)
2023	IFK Norrköping	11	(0)
2023–2026	Yverdon-Sport	31	(0)
2025	→ Xamax (loan)	11	(0)
2026–	Xamax	8	(0)

International career
2013	Norway U23	4	(0)
2016	Norway	1	(0)
- * Club domestic league appearances and goals as of 18 September 2026

Niklas Gunnarsson (born 27 April 1991) is a Norwegian footballer who plays as a defender for Swiss Challenge League club Xamax. Gunnarsson has previously played for Norwegian clubs Odd, Vålerenga, Sarpsborg 08, and Strømsgodset, Swedish clubs Elfsborg, Djurgårdens IF, and IFK Norrköping, Scottish club Hibernian, and Italian club Palermo and Swiss club Yverdon-Sport.

He is the son of former football manager Ronny Geson Gunnarsson. He is known for his trademark long throw-ins, good crossing ability and offensive play.

== Club career ==
=== Early football career in Norway ===
On 25 March 2012, Gunnarsson made his senior debut for Odd BK against Sogndal in a 0–4 loss. Gunnarsson's contract with expired after the 2013 season, after which he signed a three-year contract with Vålerenga and joined the club in January 2014.

Gunnarsson was Vålerengas' first-choice right-back during the 2014 season, starting 29 out of 30 matches in the Eliteserien. He fell out of the team in the following season, after coach Kjetil Rekdal made several changes after a poor display from the team in the Norwegian Football Cup.

=== Abroad transfers ===
Gunnarsson left Norway for Swedish football club IF Elfsborg on a loan move that left Vålerengas fans disappointed after some of his good performances in the previous season. He played 11 matches in the Allsvenskan, scoring one goal and assisting another.

"Niklas is an extremely professional player both on and off the pitch and he has done a great job for Elfsborg in his time here. He has been held in high esteem by his team mates and I would like to give him the best recommendations and wish him the best of luck in the future"' – Elfsborg head coach Magnus Haglund speaking about Gunnarsson leaving the club.

On 5 January 2016, Gunnarsson joined Scottish Championship side Hibernian on loan until the end of the 2015–16 season. He debuted on the ninth day in a Scottish Cup fourth round 2–0 win against Raith Rovers. His first goal for the club was the third goal in a 3–2 win against Rangers on 20 April. Gunnarsson also recorded a goal against Queen of the South on 1 May. He appeared as a substitute when Hibs won the Scottish Cup for the first time since 1902 in the 2016 Scottish Cup Final.

On 9 August 2016, Gunnarsson joined Allsvenskan side Djurgårdens IF on a 2 1/2-year contract. Initially given the number 28 shirt, he changed it to number 5 ahead of the 2017 season. On 10 May 2018, he played as Djurgarden beat Malmö FF 3-0 in the Swedish Cup Final.

On 1 March 2019, Gunnarsson signed a half-year contract with Italian club Palermo. Following Palermo's exclusion from the Serie B, he was released together with all other players, without making any single appearances during his short stay at the club.

=== Return to Norway ===
On 2 September 2019, Gunnarsson joined Sarpsborg 08 on a contract until the end of the 2019 season.

=== Xamax ===
On 13 February 2025, Gunnarsson was loaned by Xamax in Swiss second tier.

== International career ==
Gunnarsson received his first international call-up from the Norway national football team for friendly matches against Portugal and Belgium in May 2016. He made his only appearance against the former on the 29th day.

== Career statistics ==
As of 27 April 2023

Club	Season	Division	League		Cup		Other		Total	
Club	Season	Division	Apps	Goals	Apps	Goals	Apps	Goals	Apps	Goals
Odd	2012	Tippeligaen	22	1	4	0	–		26	1
Odd	2013	Tippeligaen	26	2	4	0	–		30	2
Odd	Total		48	3	8	0	0	0	56	3
Vålerenga	2014	Tippeligaen	29	2	2	0	–		31	2
Vålerenga	2015	Tippeligaen	12	2	1	0	–		13	2
Vålerenga	Total		41	4	3	0	0	0	44	4
Elfsborg	2015	Allsvenskan	11	1	0	0	–		11	1
Hibernian	2015–16	Scottish Championship	15	2	5	0	–		15	2
Djurgårdens IF	2016	Allsvenskan	13	2	0	0	–		13	2
Djurgårdens IF	2017	Allsvenskan	22	0	0	0	–		22	0
Djurgårdens IF	2018	Allsvenskan	20	0	7	1	–		27	1
Djurgårdens IF	2019	Allsvenskan	0	0	0	0	1	0	1	0
Djurgårdens IF	Total		55	2	7	1	1	0	63	3
Palermo	2018–19	Serie B	0	0	0	0	–		0	0
Palermo	Total		0	0	0	0	0	0	0	0
Sarpsborg 08	2019	Eliteserien	10	0	0	0	–		10	0
Sarpsborg 08	Total		10	0	0	0	0	0	10	0
Strømsgodset	2020	Eliteserien	26	0	0	0	–		26	0
Strømsgodset	2021	Eliteserien	19	0	2	1	–		21	1
Strømsgodset	2022	Eliteserien	22	0	4	1	–		26	1
Strømsgodset	Total		67	0	6	2	0	0	73	2
Norrköping	2023	Allsvenskan	1	0	0	0	–		1	0
Norrköping	Total		1	0	0	0	0	0	1	0
Career Total			248	12	29	3	1	0	278	15

== Honours ==
Hibernian

- Scottish Cup: 2015–16

Djurgårdens IF

- Svenska Cupen: 2017–18
