= Sondre Fosnæss Hanssen =

Norwegian footballer (born 2001)

Personal information
- Date of birth: 25 May 2001 (age 25)
- Height: 1.86 m (6 ft 1 in)
- Position: Defender

Team information
- Current team: Hødd
- Number: 3

Youth career
- –2020: Strømsgodset

Senior career*
Years	Team	Apps	(Gls)
2020–2024	Strømsgodset	37	(1)
2020–2024	Strømsgodset 2	36	(1)
2024	Levanger	3	(0)
2025–	Hødd	55	(1)

International career^{‡}
2016	Norway U15	1	(0)
- * Club domestic league appearances and goals as of 14 November 2026 ‡ National team caps and goals as of 28 June 2020

Sondre Fosnæss Hanssen (born 25 May 2001) is a Norwegian footballer currently playing as a defender for Hødd.

A youth product of Strømsgodset, he represented Norway once at U15 international level.

On 18 December 2024, Fosnæss Hanssen signed a contract with newly promoted OBOS-Ligaen club IL Hødd.

== Career statistics ==
=== Club ===
As of 16 June 2023.

Club	Season	League			Cup		Continental		Other		Total	
Club	Season	Division	Apps	Goals	Apps	Goals	Apps	Goals	Apps	Goals	Apps	Goals
Strømsgodset	2020	Eliteserien	19	0	0	0	–		0	0	19	0
Strømsgodset	2021	Eliteserien	1	0	1	0	–		0	0	2	0
Strømsgodset	2022	Eliteserien	8	0	1	0	–		0	0	9	0
Strømsgodset	2023	Eliteserien	9	1	3	0	–		0	0	12	1
Strømsgodset	2024	Eliteserien	0	0	2	2	–		0	0	2	2
Levanger	2026	Norwegian First Division	3	0	0	0	–		0	0	3	0
Career total			40	1	7	2	0	0	0	0	47	3
