= Lars-Christopher Vilsvik =

Norwegian footballer (born 1988)

Personal information
- Full name: Lars-Christopher Horst Jan Vilsvik
- Date of birth: 18 October 1988 (age 38)
- Place of birth: West Berlin, West Germany
- Height: 1.82 m (6 ft 0 in)
- Position: Right back

Team information
- Current team: Strømsgodset
- Number: 26

Youth career
- 1994–1998: Tennis Borussia Berlin
- 1998–2006: Lichterfelder FC

Senior career*
| Years | Team | Apps | (Gls) |
| 2006–2010 | Lichterfelder FC | 79 | (18) |
| 2010– | Strømsgodset | 446 | (30) |

International career^{‡}
| 2012 | Norway U23 | 2 | (0) |
| 2012–2013 | Norway | 5 | (0) |
- * Club domestic league appearances and goals as of 14 November 2026 ‡ National team caps and goals as of 27 March 2018

Lars-Christopher Horst Jan Vilsvik (born 18 October 1988) is a Norwegian footballer who plays as a defender for the Eliteserien side Strømsgodset. Vilsvik, who has a German mother and a Norwegian father, grew up in Germany where he played for the amateur sides Tennis Borussia Berlin and Lichterfelder FC. In 2010, he made his professional debut in Norway with Strømsgodset. Being eligible to play for both Norway and Germany, Vilsvik made his debut for the Norwegian national team in 2012.

== Career ==
=== Club career ===
Vilsvik was born in West Berlin to a Norwegian father and a German mother, and began his football career as a 6-year old for the club Tennis Borussia Berlin, where he played with his good friend Jérôme Boateng.

==== Lichterfelder FC ====
When he was 16 years old he began playing for the German fifth-tier club Lichterfelder FC. He played half a season as a junior for the club, before he as the youngest player (17) was promoted to the first team, where he played for four years. He also had trials at Rosenborg BK, Hamburger SV and Eintracht Braunschweig.

==== Strømsgodset ====
In November 2009, Vilsvik went on trial for the Norwegian club Strømsgodset, mostly as a favor to his uncle, who was a sponsor. He impressed the coach and sports director, and was given a three-year contract with the club. He became a regular starter in his first season, with 21 league games, and won the Norwegian Cup the same year.

In 2013, he declined a move to Eintracht Braunschweig because he wanted to win the league with his club.

By 11 August 2017, when he signed a new 4.5-year-contract, Vilsvik had made 243 appearances for the club, placing him 8th in club history. He won the cup in 2010, the league in 2013, and runner-up in the league in 2012 and 2014.

== International career ==
With both a German and Norwegian citizenship, Vilsvik was eligible to represent both his mother's and father's country.

In November 2011 he was called up in the Norway squad, for their game with Wales as a replacement for Tom Høgli. Vilsvik made his debut for the national team in January 2012 for the King's Cup in Thailand, where he played his first two international matches. He was again called up for the national team for in June 2012 as a replacement for Jonathan Parr, and with Vilsvik's teammate Kim André Madsen also in the squad, Strømsgodset had two players in the Norwegian squad for the first time since 1970.

== Career statistics ==
=== Club ===
As of match played 25 October 2026

Appearances and goals by club, season and competition
| Club | Season | League | | | National Cup | | Europe | | Total | |
| Club | Season | Division | Apps | Goals | Apps | Goals | Apps | Goals | Apps | Goals |
|---|---|---|---|---|---|---|---|---|---|---|
| Strømsgodset | 2010 | Tippeligaen | 27 | 2 | 7 | 0 | - | | 34 | 2 |
| Strømsgodset | 2011 | Tippeligaen | 27 | 2 | 2 | 0 | 2 | 0 | 31 | 2 |
| Strømsgodset | 2012 | Tippeligaen | 30 | 3 | 4 | 0 | - | | 34 | 3 |
| Strømsgodset | 2013 | Tippeligaen | 26 | 5 | 1 | 1 | 3 | 0 | 30 | 6 |
| Strømsgodset | 2014 | Tippeligaen | 25 | 2 | 2 | 0 | 2 | 0 | 29 | 2 |
| Strømsgodset | 2015 | Tippeligaen | 24 | 4 | 3 | 0 | 6 | 2 | 33 | 6 |
| Strømsgodset | 2016 | Tippeligaen | 29 | 3 | 6 | 1 | 2 | 0 | 37 | 4 |
| Strømsgodset | 2017 | Eliteserien | 28 | 0 | 2 | 0 | - | | 30 | 0 |
| Strømsgodset | 2018 | Eliteserien | 22 | 0 | 3 | 0 | - | | 25 | 0 |
| Strømsgodset | 2019 | Eliteserien | 28 | 1 | 1 | 0 | - | | 29 | 1 |
| Strømsgodset | 2020 | Eliteserien | 25 | 0 | 0 | 0 | - | | 25 | 0 |
| Strømsgodset | 2021 | Eliteserien | 26 | 1 | 2 | 0 | - | | 28 | 1 |
| Strømsgodset | 2022 | Eliteserien | 24 | 2 | 3 | 0 | - | | 27 | 2 |
| Strømsgodset | 2023 | Eliteserien | 24 | 1 | 2 | 0 | - | | 27 | 1 |
| Strømsgodset | 2024 | Eliteserien | 28 | 0 | 2 | 0 | - | | 30 | 0 |
| Strømsgodset | 2025 | Eliteserien | 28 | 2 | 1 | 0 | - | | 29 | 2 |
| Strømsgodset | 2026 | OBOS-liagen | 25 | 2 | 2 | 0 | - | | 27 | 2 |
| Strømsgodset | Total | | 446 | 30 | 43 | 3 | 15 | 2 | 504 | 35 |
| Career total | | | 446 | 30 | 43 | 3 | 15 | 2 | 504 | 35 |

== Honours ==
=== Club ===
- Strømsgodset:
  - Tippeligaen: 2013
  - Norwegian Football Cup: 2010

=== Individual ===
- Eliteserien Defender of the Year: 2013
