= Espen Eskås =

Norwegian football referee

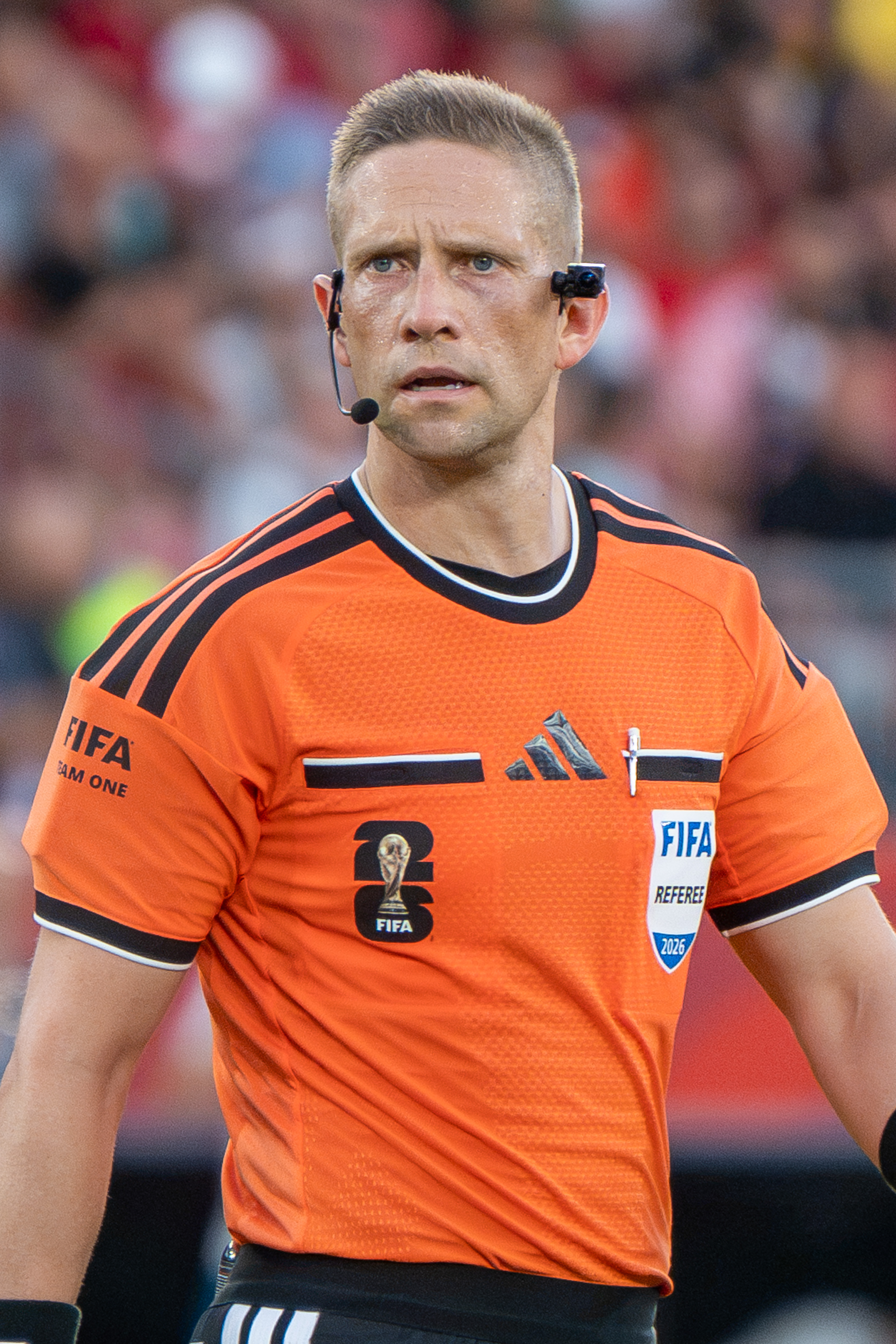
- Eskås at the 2026 FIFA World Cup
- Born: 24 June 1988 (age 38); Oslo, Norway

Domestic
Years	League	
2010–2024	Norwegian First Division	
2015–	Eliteserien	

International
Years	League	Role
2017–	FIFA listed	Referee

Espen Eskås (born 24 June 1988) is a Norwegian football referee. He is a UEFA elite referee. He began refereeing in 2005. He was chosen as the match official during the 2023 FIFA U-17 World Cup final between France and Germany.

In April 2024, Eskås was nominated as fourth official for UEFA Euro 2024 in Germany. He then refereed matches at the 2024 Summer Olympics Football Tournament in Paris. He took charge of three matches, with two appearances in the group stage—including once in the women's tournament and as the referee in the bronze medal match between Egypt and Morocco.

In 2026, he refereed the matches between Uruguay and Cape Verde during the group stage of the 2026 FIFA World Cup and later, the match between Portugal and Croatia in Toronto during the round of 32. He also served as the fourth assistant referee during the group stage match between Brazil and Scotland.

== Personal life ==
Having initially engaged in football as a player, Eskås later turned his attention to refereeing at the age of 15 or 16. Although he pursued a degree in law, he did not complete his studies. He is married.

== Selected performances ==
2026 FIFA World Cup – North America
Date	Match	Result	Round	Venue
21 June 2026	Uruguay – Cape Verde	2–2	Group stage	Hard Rock Stadium, Miami Gardens
2 July 2026	Portugal – Croatia	2–1	Round of 32	BMO Field, Toronto
