= Tore Hansen =

Norwegian football player and coach (born 1978)

- Full name: Tore Hansen
- Born: 6 February 1978 (age 48); Norway

Domestic
Years	League	Role
2011–	Eliteserien	Referee

International
Years	League	Role
2013–	FIFA listed	Referee

Tore Hansen (born 6 February 1978) is a Norwegian football referee and former footballer and football coach.

== Career ==
=== As player ===
Tore Hansen played as a midfielder for Mandalskameratene in 2000–2004 and 2006–2008. He also had several spells in English football, playing for amateur clubs Worksop Town and Ossett Town. In 2004 he was trial at Sheffield Wednesday. He retired after the 2008 season and became assistant coach and later head coach in Mandalskameratene. He left his position as head coach in June 2009 to focus on refereeing.

=== As referee ===
Hansen began refereeing in 2006, and made his referee debut in the seventh tier in 6. divisjon, the Norwegian football league system. Hansen was refereeing in 3. divisjon between 2007 and 2009 and was a 2. divisjon referee from 2009 to 2010. He made his first appearance in the 1. divisjon (second tier) in 2010 and his Eliteserien debut on 18 September 2011. He became a FIFA referee in 2013. In 2016, Hansen was awarded the Referee of the Year award and refereed the 2016 Norwegian Football Cup Final.

In the 2025–26 Norwegian Football Cup third round match between Egersunds IK and Lyn, Hansen was involved in a controversial moment, as the ball struck him in the build up to the lone goal in Lyn's original 1–0 victory. After a formal protest by Egersunds, the match was replayed in full. Egersunds won 3–2.
