= Herman Stengel =

Norwegian footballer (born 1995)

Personal information
- Full name: Herman Sørby Stengel
- Date of birth: 26 August 1995 (age 31)
- Place of birth: Hokksund, Norway
- Position: Midfielder

Team information
- Current team: Strømsgodset
- Number: 10

Youth career
- Hokksund
- Stabæk

Senior career*
Years	Team	Apps	(Gls)
2011–2013	Stabæk	54	(0)
2014–2017	Vålerenga	93	(10)
2018–	Strømsgodset	245	(36)

International career^{‡}
2010	Norway U15	5	(2)
2011	Norway U16	12	(2)
2012	Norway U17	6	(2)
2013	Norway U18	7	(1)
2014	Norway U19	4	(0)
- * Club domestic league appearances and goals as of 14 November 2026 ‡ National team caps and goals as of 7 June 2014

Herman Sørby Stengel (born 26 August 1995) is a Norwegian footballer who plays as a midfielder for Eliteserien side Strømsgodset. He has previously played for Stabæk and Vålerenga, and has represented his country at youth level.

== Club career ==
Stengel was born in Lørenskog, and grew up in Hokksund, where he played for Hokksund before he joined Stabæk as a youth. He started playing for their senior B team, Stabæk 2, and became the youngest goalscorer ever in the Norwegian Second Division. In May 2010 he scored his first senior goal at the age 14 years and 261 days.

In 2009, Stengel did a trial at Manchester United together with Mats Møller Dæhli, who later joined the club's academy and Sondre Tronstad. In December 2012, Stabæk granted Stengel a week to trial with PSV Eindhoven.

On 2 October 2011, Stengel made his Norwegian Premier League debut, starting the match against Sarpsborg 08. Aged 16 years and 37 days, he became the youngest Stabæk-player to start a match in Tippeligaen, and the then third youngest player in the Norwegian top division.

Stengel became known during the autumn of 2011, as he was a piece of Veigar Páll Gunnarsson's transfer to Vålerenga, which caused great controversy. TV 2 (Norway) revealed on 12 October 2011 that Gunnarsson was transferred to Vålerenga for 1 million NOK, while Vålerenga paid a transfer fee of 4 million NOK for an option for the then 15-year-old footballer Stengel. In February 2012, Stengel stated that he wants to be known as a footballer, not as the guy who was a piece in the controversial football transfer, and that his dream is to play in one of the best leagues in Europe.

After Stabæk was relegated from Tippeligaen in 2012, Stengel was one of the key-players in the young Stabæk-team that finished the 2013 season second in the First Division and won promotion back to Tippeligaen. His contract with Stabæk expired after the season and he joined Vålerenga as a free agent ahead of the 2014 season, signing a four-year contract with the club.

On 20 November 2017, Strømsgodset Toppfotball announced that Stengel had signed a three-year deal from 1 January 2018.

== International career ==
Stengel scored six goals in twenty-three matches for Norwegian under-15 to under-17 between 2010 and 2012.

== Career statistics ==
=== Club ===
As of match played 15 August 2026

Appearances and goals by club, season and competition
Club	Season	League			National Cup		Europe		Total	
Club	Season	Division	Apps	Goals	Apps	Goals	Apps	Goals	Apps	Goals
Stabæk	2011	Tippeligaen	5	0	1	0	-		6	0
Stabæk	2012	Tippeligaen	20	0	3	0	2	0	25	0
Stabæk	2013	Adeccoligaen	29	0	4	1	-		33	1
Stabæk	Total		54	0	8	1	2	0	64	1
Vålerenga	2014	Tippeligaen	24	2	2	0	-		26	2
Vålerenga	2015	Tippeligaen	23	2	2	2	-		25	4
Vålerenga	2016	Tippeligaen	25	0	4	0	-		29	0
Vålerenga	2017	Eliteserien	21	6	5	1	-		26	7
Vålerenga	Total		93	10	13	3	-	-	106	3
Strømsgodset	2018	Eliteserien	25	1	6	0	-		31	1
Strømsgodset	2019	Eliteserien	30	1	3	0	-		33	1
Strømsgodset	2020	Eliteserien	15	1	0	0	-		15	1
Strømsgodset	2021	Eliteserien	29	6	2	0	-		31	6
Strømsgodset	2022	Eliteserien	29	3	4	0	-		33	3
Strømsgodset	2023	Eliteserien	28	6	4	0	-		32	6
Strømsgodset	2024	Eliteserien	30	4	4	2	-		34	6
Strømsgodset	2025	Eliteserien	29	3	3	1	-		32	4
Strømsgodset	2026	OBOS-ligaen	18	7	0	0	-		18	7
Strømsgodset	Total		233	32	26	3	-	-	259	35
Career total			380	42	47	6	2	0	429	49
