= Tobias Gulliksen =

Norwegian footballer (born 2003)

Personal information
- Full name: Tobias Fjeld Gulliksen
- Date of birth: 9 July 2003 (age 23)
- Place of birth: Drammen, Norway
- Height: 1.77 m (5 ft 10 in)
- Positions: Winger; midfielder

Team information
- Current team: Kocaelispor (on loan from Rapid Wien)
- Number: 8

Youth career
- –2014: Konnerud
- 2015–2019: Strømsgodset

Senior career*
Years	Team	Apps	(Gls)
2020–2023	Strømsgodset	66	(7)
2023–2024	Bodø/Glimt	11	(4)
2024–2025	Djurgården	44	(7)
2025–	Rapid Wien	23	(0)
2026–	→ Kocaelispor (loan)	3	(0)

International career^{‡}
2018	Norway U15	1	(1)
2019	Norway U16	14	(7)
2021	Norway U19	3	(0)
2022–2023	Norway U20	4	(0)
2023–2024	Norway U21	11	(1)
- * Club domestic league appearances and goals as of 18 October 2026 ‡ National team caps and goals as of 6 June 2024

Tobias Fjeld Gulliksen (born 9 July 2003) is a Norwegian professional footballer who plays as a winger or midfielder for Turkish Süper Lig club club Kocaelispor on loan from Austrian club Rapid Wien.

== Career ==
Joining Strømsgodset's youth setup in 2015 from Konnerud IL, he represented Norway as a youth international for the first time in 2018. In 2019 he and his older brother Mathias signed professional contracts with Strømsgodset, albeit with a place in the B team squad. Tobias Fjeld Gulliksen prolonged his contract in late 2019, while also being benched for the senior team and playing friendly matches. He made his league debut in June 2020 against Aalesund.

In September 2022, he was convicted of speeding, having driven 148 km/h in a 70 km/h zone. He was sentenced to 21 days in prison.

On 21 July 2023, Eliteserien club Bodø/Glimt announced the signing of Gulliksen on a four-year contract.

On 23 February 2024, the Swedish club Djurgården announced the signing of Gulliksen from Bodø/Glimt.

On 2 September 2025, Gulliksen left Djurgården for Austrian club, SK Rapid Wien on a four-year contract. Estimated price of the transfer is around 4 million euro.

== Career statistics ==
As of match played 12 August 2026

Appearances and goals by club, season and competition
Club	Season	League			Norwegian Cup		Continental		Total	
Club	Season	Division	Apps	Goals	Apps	Goals	Apps	Goals	Apps	Goals
Strømsgodset	2019	Eliteserien	0	0	0	0	—		0	0
Strømsgodset	2020	Eliteserien	7	0	—		—		7	0
Strømsgodset	2021	Eliteserien	27	5	4	1	—		31	6
Strømsgodset	2022	Eliteserien	22	2	0	0	—		22	2
Strømsgodset	2023	Eliteserien	10	0	3	1	—		13	1
Strømsgodset	Total		66	7	7	2	–		73	9
Bodø/Glimt	2023	Eliteserien	11	4	2	0	8	1	21	5
Bodø/Glimt	2024	Eliteserien	0	0	0	0	2	0	2	0
Bodø/Glimt	Total		11	4	2	0	10	1	23	5
Djurgården	2024	Allsvenskan	26	5	5	2	12	2	43	9
Djurgården	2025	Allsvenskan	18	2	3	0	4	2	25	4
Djurgården	Total		44	7	8	2	16	4	68	13
Rapid Wien	2025–26	Austrian Bundesliga	22	0	3	2	5	0	30	2
Rapid Wien	2026–27	Austrian Bundesliga	0	0	1	0	3	0	4	0
Rapid Wien	Total		22	0	4	2	8	0	34	2
Kocaelispor (loan)	2026–27	Süper Lig	0	0	0	0	0	0	0	0
Career total			143	18	21	6	34	5	198	29

== Honours ==
Bodø/Glimt

- Eliteserien: 2023

Individual

- Eliteserien Young Player of the Month: June 2023
- UEFA Conference League Young Player of the Season: 2024–25
