= Jack Ipalibo =

Nigerian footballer

Personal information
- Date of birth: 6 April 1998 (age 28)
- Place of birth: Nigeria
- Height: 1.87 m (6 ft 2 in)
- Position: Midfielder

Team information
- Current team: Hamrun Spartans
- Number: 18

Youth career
- 2016: Diamond Football Academy
- 2016–2019: Villarreal C

Senior career*
Years	Team	Apps	(Gls)
2019–2020	Villarreal B	0	(0)
2019	→ Strømsgodset (loan)	22	(0)
2020–2023	Strømsgodset	85	(8)
2023–2024	Kifisia	15	(0)
2024	Chornomorets Odesa	2	(0)
2024–2025	Zalaegerszeg	17	(2)
2025–2026	Torreense	2	(0)
2026–	Hamrun Spartans	1	(0)
- * Club domestic league appearances and goals as of 11 September 2026

Jack Ipalibo (born 6 April 1998) is a Nigerian professional footballer who plays as a midfielder for Maltese Premier League club Hamrun Spartans.

== Career ==
=== Early years ===
Ipalibo started his football career at Diamond Football Academy in Nigeria in 2016.

=== Villarreal C ===
On 11 September 2016, Ipalibo transferred to the academy of Spanish club Villarreal C.

=== Villarreal B ===
Ipalibo showed an outstanding performance in a short time and was promoted to the Villarreal B team. He started training with the first team from time to time with Villarreal.

==== Loan to Strømsgodset ====
On 3 August 2019, Ipalibo signed for Strømsgodset on a year-long loan deal from Villarreal B. In his first season with Strømsgodset, he failed to contribute any goals in 15 games.

On 1 July 2020, he received a red card in the match played against Stabæk Fotball in the 5th week of the season at Eliteserien, which was the first red card of his career.

=== Strømsgodset ===
On 30 June 2020, Ipalibo signed permanently for Strømsgodset, on a three-year-long deal. In the 2020–21 season, he scored his first goal against Viking FK. In 22 matches with Strømsgodset, scoring a total of 3 goals in Odds BK and Sarpsborg 08 matches. He scored his first goal in Eliteserien with Strømsgodset in the 2022–23 season, in the 37th minute of their 3–0 win against Rosenborg on 8 May 2022. Ipalibo scored 3 more goals for the rest of the season and finished Eliteserien with 4 goals in 2021–22.

=== Chornomorets Odesa ===
On 23 February 2024, Ipalibo joined Ukrainian Premier League side Chornomorets Odesa. At the beginning of March, he left the team.

=== Zalaegerszegi TE ===
On 27 August 2024, Ipalibo signed for the Hungarian Nemzeti Bajnokság I club Zalaegerszegi TE.

== Style of play ==
Ipalibo has been compared to the famous Ivorian football player Yaya Touré with his playing style and talent.

== Career statistics ==
As of match played 9 October 2022

Appearances and goals by club, season and competition
Club	Season	League			Norwegian Cup		Continental		Other		Total	
Club	Season	Division	Apps	Goals	Apps	Goals	Apps	Goals	Apps	Goals	Apps	Goals
Strømsgodset (loan)	2019	Eliteserien	15	0	0	0	—		—		15	0
Strømsgodset	2020	Eliteserien	22	0	0	0	—		—		22	0
Strømsgodset	2021	Eliteserien	22	3	0	0	—		—		22	3
Strømsgodset	2022	Eliteserien	22	4	1	0	—		—		23	4
Strømsgodset	Total		66	7	1	0	0	0	0	0	67	7
Career total			81	4	0	0	0	0	0	0	82	7
