= 2013 Strømsgodset Toppfotball season =

Strømsgodset
2013 season
- Chairman: Erik Espeseth
- Manager: Ronny Deila
- Stadium: Marienlyst Stadion
- Tippeligaen: 1st (champions)
- Norwegian Cup: Second round (vs. Asker)
- Europa League: Third qualifying round (vs. Jablonec)
- Top goalscorer: League: Ola Kamara (12); All: Ola Kamara (13)
- Highest home attendance: 7,544 vs Haugesund; 10 November 2013
- Lowest home attendance: 3,582 vs Debreceni; 18 July 2013
- Average home league attendance: 6,214

The 2013 season was Strømsgodset's 7th season in Tippeligaen following their promotion back to the top flight in 2006. It was Ronny Deila's sixth season in charge, and he led them to their first Tippeligaen title since 1970. In the cup they were knocked out by 2. divisjon side Asker and they were knocked out of the UEFA Europa League by Jablonec in the 3rd qualifying round after beating Debreceni in the 2nd round.

== Squad ==
As of 13 March 2013

Note: Flags indicate national team as defined under FIFA eligibility rules; some limited exceptions apply. Players may hold more than one non-FIFA nationality.

No.	Pos.	Nation	Player
2	DF	NOR	Mounir Hamoud
3	DF	NOR	Lars Sætra
4	DF	NOR	Kim André Madsen
5	DF	NOR	Jørgen Horn
6	MF	NOR	Simen Brenne
7	FW	NOR	Muhamed Keita
8	MF	NOR	Stefan Johansen
9	FW	NOR	Øyvind Storflor
10	FW	HUN	Péter Kovács
11	FW	NOR	Adama Diomande
12	GK	GHA	Adam Larsen
14	MF	NOR	Iver Fossum
15	FW	NOR	Flamur Kastrati
16	MF	NOR	Abdisalam Ibrahim (on loan from Manchester City)

No.	Pos.	Nation	Player
17	FW	NOR	Thomas Lehne Olsen
18	MF	NOR	Martin Ovenstad
19	FW	NOR	Gustav Wikheim
22	MF	GHA	Bismark Adjei-Boateng (on loan from Manchester City)
23	FW	NOR	Thomas Sørum
24	GK	NOR	Lars Stubhaug
25	FW	NOR	Tokmac Nguen
26	DF	NOR	Lars Christopher Vilsvik
27	DF	NOR	Jarl André Storbæk
28	DF	GHA	Razak Nuhu (on loan from Manchester City)
29	DF	NOR	Ole Amund Sveen
45	MF	NOR	Mads Gundersen
50	DF	NOR	Karanveer Grewal
92	FW	NOR	Ola Kamara (on loan from SV Ried)

== Transfers ==
=== Winter ===
In: Note: Flags indicate national team as defined under FIFA eligibility rules; some limited exceptions apply. Players may hold more than one non-FIFA nationality.

No.	Pos.	Nation	Player
5	DF	NOR	Jørgen Horn (from (Norway) Fredrikstad)
6	MF	NOR	Simen Brenne (from (Norway) Odd Grenland)
14	MF	NOR	Iver Fossum
17	FW	NOR	Thomas Lehne Olsen (from (Norway) HamKam)
23	MF	NOR	Thomas Sørum (from (Sweden) Helsingborg)
24	GK	NOR	Lars Stubhaug (from (Norway) Hønefoss)

Out: Note: Flags indicate national team as defined under FIFA eligibility rules; some limited exceptions apply. Players may hold more than one non-FIFA nationality.

No.	Pos.	Nation	Player
6	DF	NOR	Alexander Aas (Retired)
11	FW	NOR	Ola Kamara (to (Germany) 1860 München)
14	MF	NOR	Lars Iver Strand (to (Norway) Sandefjord)
23	MF	NOR	Anders Konradsen (to (France) Rennes)
24	GK	NOR	Lars Cramer (to (Sweden) Kalmar)

=== Summer ===
In: Note: Flags indicate national team as defined under FIFA eligibility rules; some limited exceptions apply. Players may hold more than one non-FIFA nationality.

No.	Pos.	Nation	Player
15	FW	NOR	Flamur Kastrati (from (Germany) Erzgebirge Aue)
92	FW	NOR	Ola Kamara (on loan from (Austria) SV Ried)

Out: Note: Flags indicate national team as defined under FIFA eligibility rules; some limited exceptions apply. Players may hold more than one non-FIFA nationality.

No.	Pos.	Nation	Player
1	GK	NOR	Borger Thomas (loan to (Norway) Drammen)
21	MF	GHA	Enock Kwakwa (loan return to (England) Manchester City)

== Competitions ==
=== Tippeligaen ===
==== Results summary ====
Overall								Home						Away					
Pld	W	D	L	GF	GA	GD	Pts	W	D	L	GF	GA	GD	W	D	L	GF	GA	GD
30	19	6	5	66	25	+41	63	13	2	0	40	12	+28	6	4	5	26	13	+13

==== Results by round ====
Round	1	2	3	4	5	6	7	8	9	10	11	12	13	14	15	16	17	18	19	20	21	22	23	24	25	26	27	28	29	30
Ground	H	A	H	A	H	A	H	A	H	H	A	H	A	H	A	A	H	A	H	A	H	A	H	A	A	H	A	H	A	H
Result	W	L	D	W	W	W	W	D	W	W	W	W	L	W	L	L	W	W	D	D	W	L	W	D	W	W	W	W	D	W
Position	3	9	9	4	3	2	1	1	1	1	1	1	1	1	1	2	2	2	2	2	2	2	1	1	1	1	1	1	1	1

Updated to match(es) played on 11 November 2013. Source: see below
A = Away; H = Home; W = Win; D = Draw; L = Loss

==== Results ====
17 March 2013 1	Strømsgodset	2–0	Sandnes Ulf	Drammen
18:00 CET (UTC+1)	Kovács 23'; Vilsvik 61'	Summary		Stadium: Marienlyst Stadion; Attendance: 5,175; Referee: Svein Erik Edvartsen

2 April 2013 2	Hønefoss	2–0	Strømsgodset	Hønefoss
18:30CEST (UTC+2)	Riski 81'; Solli 90'	Summary	Madsen (red card) 79'	Stadium: Aka Arena; Attendance: 2,645; Referee: Trond Ivar Døvle

7 April 2013 3	Strømsgodset	1–1	Sarpsborg 08	Drammen
15:30CEST (UTC+2)	Vilsvik 12'	Summary	Elyounoussi 115'	Stadium: Marienlyst Stadion; Attendance: 5,780; Referee: Tom Harald Hagen

13 April 2013 4	Vålerenga	0–3	Strømsgodset	Oslo
18:00 CEST (UTC+2)		Summary	Storflor 3'; Storbæk 9'; Keita 16'	Stadium: Ullevaal Stadion; Attendance: 9,740; Referee: Svein Moen

21 April 2013 5	Strømsgodset	1–0	Lillestrøm	Drammen
18:00 CEST (UTC+2)	Kovács 38'	Summary		Stadium: Marienlyst Stadion; Attendance: 6,465; Referee: Brage Sandmoen

28 April 2013 6	Molde	1–2	Strømsgodset	Molde
19:00 CEST (UTC+2)	Chima 83'	Summary	Vilsvik 30'; Keita 54'	Stadium: Aker Stadion; Attendance: 7,854; Referee: Svein Oddvar Moen

5 May 2013 7	Strømsgodset	3–1	Viking	Drammen
18:00 CEST (UTC+2)	Vilsvik 10'; Keita 45'; Diomande 72'	Summary	Ingelsten 48' (pen.)	Stadium: Marienlyst Stadion; Attendance: 6,934; Referee: Tom Harald Hagen

9 May 2013 8	Odd	1–1	Strømsgodset	Skien
18:00 CEST (UTC+2)	Shala 44'	Summary	Diomande 71'	Stadium: Skagerak Arena; Attendance: 5,131; Referee: Per Ivar Staberg

12 May 2013 9	Strømsgodset	2–0	Brann	Drammen
18:00 CEST (UTC+2)	Gjesdal 20' (o.g.); Diomande 41'	Summary		Stadium: Marienlyst Stadion; Attendance: 6,859; Referee: Svein Oddvar Moen

16 May 2013 10	Strømsgodset	3–1	Sogndal	Drammen
18:00 CEST (UTC+2)	Adjei-Boateng 3', 72'; Johansen 55'	Summary	Mane 71'	Stadium: Marienlyst Stadion; Attendance: 6,786; Referee: Trond Ivar Døvle

20 May 2013 11	Start	0–6	Strømsgodset	Kristiansand
15:30 CEST (UTC+2)		Summary	Adjei-Boateng 7'; Johansen 11'; Storbæk 18'; Andersen 38' (o.g.); Diomande 54'; Horn (red card) 59'; Wikheim 90'	Stadium: Sør Arena; Attendance: 6,001; Referee: Per Ivar Staberg

24 May 2013 12	Strømsgodset	2–1	Aalesund	Drammen
19:00 CEST (UTC+2)	Diomande 19'; Kovács 43'	Summary	Barrantes 13'	Stadium: Marienlyst Stadion; Attendance: 6,623; Referee: Dag Vidar Hafsås

23 June 2013 13	Rosenborg	1–0	Strømsgodset	Trondheim
18:00 CET (UTC+1)	Jensen 44'	Summary		Stadium: Lerkendal Stadion; Attendance: 19,063; Referee: Svein Oddvar Moen

29 June 2013 14	Strømsgodset	3–1	Tromsø	Drammen
18:00 CEST (UTC+2)	Vilsvik 31' (pen.); Ibrahim 58'; Adjei-Boateng 84'	Summary	Bendiksen 21'	Stadium: Marienlyst Stadion; Attendance: 5,888; Referee: Svein Edvartsen

6 July 2013 15	Haugesund	2–1	Strømsgodset	Haugesund
18:00 CEST (UTC+2)	Hamoud 23' (o.g.); Haukås 66'	Summary	Ovenstad 83'	Stadium: Haugesund Stadion; Attendance: 4,273; Referee: Per Ivar Staberg

14 July 2013 16	Sandnes Ulf	2–1	Strømsgodset	Sandnes
18:00 CEST (UTC+2)	Furebotn 33'; Helle 56'	Summary	Adjei-Boateng 37'	Stadium: Sandnes Idrettspark; Attendance: 2,609; Referee: Trond Ivar Døvle

28 July 2013 17	Strømsgodset	6–1	Hønefoss	Drammen
15:30 CEST (UTC+2)	Kamara 2', 30', 90+2'; Storflor 24'; Sigurdsson 28' (o.g.); Kovács 70'	Summary	Riski 22'	Stadium: Marienlyst Stadion; Attendance: 5,628; Referee: Per Ivar Staberg

4 August 2013 18	Sarpsborg 08	2–4	Strømsgodset	Sarpsborg
15:30 CEST (UTC+2)	Breive 33'; Olanare 54'	Summary	Brenne 3'; Diomande 45'; Storbæk 55'; Adjei-Boateng 83'	Stadium: Sarpsborg Stadion; Attendance: 3,620; Referee: Trond Ivar Døvle

11 August 2013 19	Strømsgodset	2–2	Rosenborg	Drammen
18:00 CEST (UTC+2)	Kamara 33'; Storflor 54'	Summary	Reginiussen 31'; Chibuike 72'	Stadium: Marienlyst Stadion; Attendance: 7,471; Referee: Svein Oddvar Moen

19 August 2013 20	Lillestrøm	1–1	Strømsgodset	Lillestrøm
19:00 CEST (UTC+2)	Vilsvik 90+2'	Summary	Kamara 61'	Stadium: Åråsen Stadion; Attendance: 5,860; Referee: Tommy Skjerven

24 August 2013 21	Strømsgodset	5–2	Molde	Drammen
17:00 CEST (UTC+2)	Kamara 10', 83' (pen.); Storbæk 42'; Hamoud 58'; Storflor 61'	Summary	Gulbrandsen 32'; Linnes 51'	Stadium: Marienlyst Stadion; Attendance: 7,110; Referee: Svein Erik Edvartsen

1 September 2013 22	Viking	1–0	Strømsgodset	Stavanger
18:00 CEST (UTC+2)	Gyan 71'	Summary	Johansen (red card) 90+1'	Stadium: Viking Stadion; Attendance: 10,105; Referee: Tommy Skjerven

15 September 2013 23	Strømsgodset	3–1	Odd	Drammen
15:30 CEST (UTC+2)	Ibrahim 10'; Adjei-Boateng 77'; Diomande 86'	Summary	Johnsen 62'; Eriksen (yellow card) 70' (yellow-red card) 76'	Stadium: Marienlyst Stadion; Attendance: 6,204; Referee: Tore Hansen

21 September 2013 24	Brann	1–1	Strømsgodset	Bergen
18:00 CEST (UTC+2)	Huseklepp 48'	Summary	Storflor 65'	Stadium: Brann Stadion; Attendance: 10,296; Referee: Per Ivar Staberg

27 September 2013 25	Sogndal	0–5	Strømsgodset	Sogndalsfjøra
19:00 CEST (UTC+2)		Summary	Kamara 8', 19', 22'; Diomande 26'; Kastrati 90+2'	Stadium: Fosshaugane Campus; Attendance: 3,324; Referee: Svein Erik Edvartsen

5 October 2013 26	Strømsgodset	2–1	Vålerenga	Drammen
18:00 CEST (UTC+2)	Johansen 61'; Storflor 88'	Summary	Zajić 85'	Stadium: Marienlyst Stadion; Attendance: 6,845; Referee: Tom Harald Hagen

20 October 2013 27	Aalesund	0–1	Strømsgodset	Ålesund
19:00 CEST (UTC+2)		Summary	Kovács 82'	Stadium: Color Line Stadion; Attendance: 6,932; Referee: Espen Berntsen

27 October 2013 28	Strømsgodset	1–0	Start	Drammen
19:00 CEST (UTC+2)	Kovács 82'	Summary		Stadium: Marienlyst Stadion; Attendance: 6,577; Referee: Brage Sandmoen

3 November 2013 29	Tromsø	0–0	Strømsgodset	Tromsø
18:00 CET (UTC+1)	Fojut (yellow card) 58'; Norbye (yellow card) 88'; Kristiansen (yellow card) 90'	Summary	Diomande (yellow card) 64'; Ibrahim (yellow card) 75'	Stadium: Alfheim Stadion; Attendance: 6,392; Referee: Ken Henry Johnsen

10 November 2013 30	Strømsgodset	4–0	Haugesund	Drammen
18:00 CET (UTC+1)	Kamara 53', 90'; Johansen 64'; Storflor 69'	Summary	Cvetinović (red card) 55'	Stadium: Marienlyst Stadion; Attendance: 7,544; Referee: Svein Erik Edvartsen

==== Table ====
Pos	Team	Pld	W	D	L	GF	GA	GD	Pts	Qualification or relegation
1	Strømsgodset (C)	30	19	6	5	66	26	+40	63	Qualification for the Champions League second qualifying round
2	Rosenborg	30	18	8	4	50	25	+25	62	Qualification for the Europa League first qualifying round
3	Haugesund	30	15	6	9	41	39	+2	51	Qualification for the Europa League first qualifying round
4	Aalesund	30	14	7	9	55	44	+11	49	
5	Viking	30	12	10	8	41	36	+5	46	

Source: fotball.no
Rules for classification: 1) points; 2) goal difference; 3) number of goals scored.
(C) Champions

=== Norwegian Cup ===
17 April 2013 First Round	Hallingdal	0–11	Strømsgodset	Hallingdal
18:00 CEST (UTC+2)		Summary	Horn 2'; 9' (o.g.); Kovács 14', 45+1'; Kwakwa 27', 39'; Fossum 34'; Gundersen 75', 84'; Sørum 88', 90+4'	Stadium: Gol kunstgress Attendance: 1,900; Referee: Ole-Martin Loeshagen

1 May 2013 Second Round	Asker	2–1	Strømsgodset	Asker
18:00 CEST (UTC+2)	Sæthre 29'; Mohammadian 57'	Report	Vilsvik 61'	Stadium: Føyka Stadion; Attendance: 2,019; Referee: Martin Lundby

=== Europa League ===
==== Qualifying phase ====
18 July 2013 2nd qualifying round 1st leg	Strømsgodset (Norway)	2–2	(Hungary) Debrecen	Drammen, Norway
19:00 CEST (UTC+2)	Horn 53'; Kovács 90+3'	Report	Sidibe 36', 55' (pen.); Bodi (yellow card) 52' (yellow-red card) 67'	Stadium: Marienlyst Stadion; Attendance: 3,582; Referee: Marius Avram (Romania)

25 July 2013 2nd qualifying round 2nd leg	Debrecen (Hungary)	0–3 (2–5 agg.)	(Norway) Strømsgodset	Debrecen, Hungary
20:30 CEST (UTC+2)		Report	Kovács 35'; Adjei-Boateng 51'; Storflor 58'; Storbæk (red card) 71'	Stadium: Stadion Oláh Gábor Út; Attendance: 6,300; Referee: Ilias Spathas (Greece)

1 August 2013 3rd qualifying round 1st leg	Jablonec (Czech Republic)	2–1	(Norway) Strømsgodset	Jablonec nad Nisou, Czech Republic
18:00 CEST (UTC+2)	Piták 17' (pen.); Vošahlík 90+1'	Report	Beneš 39' (o.g.)	Stadium: Chance Arena; Attendance: 4,285; Referee: Leontios Trattou (Cyprus)

8 August 2013 3rd qualifying round 2nd leg	Strømsgodset (Norway)	1–3 (2–5 agg.)	(Czech Republic) Jablonec	Drammen, Norway
20:00 CEST (UTC+2)	Kamara 71'	Report	Hubník 15'; Vaněk 81'; Piták 90'	Stadium: Marienlyst Stadion; Attendance: 4,439; Referee: Gediminas Mažeika (Lithuania)

== Squad statistics ==
As of 11 November 2013

=== Appearances and goals ===
No.	Pos	Nat	Player	Total		Tippeligaen		Norwegian Cup		Europa League	
No.	Pos	Nat	Player	Apps	Goals	Apps	Goals	Apps	Goals	Apps	Goals
2	DF	(Norway) NOR	Mounir Hamoud	23	1	13+4	1	1+1	0	3+1	0
3	DF	(Norway) NOR	Lars Sætra	5	0	1+4	0	0+0	0	0+0	0
4	DF	(Norway) NOR	Kim André Madsen	31	0	26+0	0	2+0	0	3+0	0
5	DF	(Norway) NOR	Jørgen Horn	32	2	26+0	0	2+0	1	4+0	1
6	MF	(Norway) NOR	Simen Brenne	17	1	9+5	1	0+1	0	0+2	0
7	FW	(Norway) NOR	Muhamed Keita	21	3	15+4	3	0+1	0	0+1	0
8	MF	(Norway) NOR	Stefan Johansen	32	4	27+0	4	1+0	0	4+0	0
9	FW	(Norway) NOR	Øyvind Storflor	32	8	26+1	7	1+0	0	4+0	1
10	FW	(Hungary) HUN	Péter Kovács	31	10	15+10	6	2+0	2	4+0	2
11	FW	(Norway) NOR	Adama Diomande	27	8	15+10	8	0+1	0	0+1	0
12	GK	(Ghana) GHA	Adam Larsen Kwarasey	34	0	30+0	0	1+0	0	3+0	0
14	MF	(Norway) NOR	Iver Fossum	5	1	0+4	0	1+0	1	0+0	0
15	FW	(Norway) NOR	Flamur Kastrati	11	1	2+9	1	0+0	0	0+0	0
16	MF	(Norway) NOR	Abdisalam Ibrahim	32	2	25+2	2	1+0	0	4+0	0
17	FW	(Norway) NOR	Thomas Lehne Olsen	5	0	2+2	0	0+0	0	1+0	0
18	MF	(Norway) NOR	Martin Ovenstad	17	1	5+8	1	2+0	0	0+2	0
19	FW	(Norway) NOR	Gustav Wikheim	21	1	5+11	1	2+0	0	2+1	0
22	MF	(Ghana) GHA	Bismark Adjei-Boateng	21	8	13+4	7	0+0	0	4+0	1
23	FW	(Norway) NOR	Thomas Sørum	7	2	4+2	0	1+0	2	0+0	0
24	GK	(Norway) NOR	Lars Stubhaug	2	0	0+0	0	1+0	0	1+0	0
21	FW	(Norway) NOR	Tokmac Nguen	1	0	0+1	0	0+0	0	0+0	0
26	DF	(Norway) NOR	Lars Christopher Vilsvik	30	6	26+0	5	1+0	1	3+0	0
27	DF	(Norway) NOR	Jarl André Storbæk	28	4	26+0	4	0+0	0	2+0	0
28	DF	(Ghana) GHA	Razak Nuhu	10	0	5+1	0	2+0	0	1+1	0
29	DF	(Norway) NOR	Ole Amund Sveen	5	0	0+2	0	0+1	0	0+2	0
45	MF	(Norway) NOR	Mads Gundersen	1	2	0+0	0	0+1	2	0+0	0
92	FW	(Norway) NOR	Ola Kamara	16	13	14+0	12	0+0	0	1+1	1
Players away from Strømsgodset on loan:
Players who left Strømsgodset during the season:
21	MF	(Ghana) GHA	Enock Kwakwa	2	2	0+1	0	1+0	2	0+0	0

=== Goal scorers ===
Place	Position	Nation	Number	Name	Tippeligaen	Norwegian Cup	Europa League	Total
1	FW	(Norway)	92	Ola Kamara	12	0	1	13
2	FW	(Hungary)	10	Péter Kovács	6	2	2	10
3	FW	(Norway)	11	Adama Diomande	8	0	0	8
3	MF	(Ghana)	22	Bismark Adjei-Boateng	7	0	1	8
3	FW	(Norway)	9	Øyvind Storflor	7	0	1	8
6	DF	(Norway)	26	Lars Christopher Vilsvik	5	1	0	6
7				Own goal	3	1	1	5
8	DF	(Norway)	27	Jarl André Storbæk	4	0	0	4
8	MF	(Norway)	8	Stefan Johansen	4	0	0	4
10	FW	(Norway)	7	Muhamed Keita	3	0	0	3
11	MF	(Norway)	16	Abdisalam Ibrahim	2	0	0	2
11	MF	(Ghana)	21	Enock Kwakwa	0	2	0	2
11	MF	(Norway)	45	Mads Gundersen	0	2	0	2
11	FW	(Norway)	23	Thomas Sørum	0	2	0	2
11	DF	(Norway)	5	Jørgen Horn	0	1	1	2
16	MF	(Norway)	18	Martin Ovenstad	1	0	0	1
16	MF	(Norway)	6	Simen Brenne	1	0	0	1
16	DF	(Norway)	2	Mounir Hamoud	1	0	0	1
16	FW	(Norway)	15	Flamur Kastrati	1	0	0	1
16	FW	(Norway)	19	Gustav Wikheim	1	0	0	1
16	MF	(Norway)	14	Iver Fossum	0	1	0	1
				TOTALS	66	12	7	85

=== Disciplinary record ===
Number	Nation	Position	Name	Tippeligaen		Norwegian Cup		Europa League		Total	
Number	Nation	Position	Name	Yellow card	Red card	Yellow card	Red card	Yellow card	Red card	Yellow card	Red card
2	(Norway)	DF	Mounir Hamoud	2	0	0	0	0	0	2	0
4	(Norway)	DF	Kim André Madsen	3	1	1	0	0	0	4	1
5	(Norway)	DF	Jørgen Horn	7	1	0	0	0	0	7	1
6	(Norway)	MF	Simen Brenne	1	0	0	0	0	0	1	0
7	(Norway)	FW	Muhamed Keita	3	0	0	0	0	0	3	0
8	(Norway)	MF	Stefan Johansen	4	1	0	0	2	0	6	1
9	(Norway)	FW	Øyvind Storflor	2	0	0	0	0	0	2	0
10	(Hungary)	FW	Péter Kovács	2	0	0	0	1	0	3	0
11	(Norway)	FW	Adama Diomande	2	0	0	0	0	0	2	0
12	(Ghana)	GK	Adam Larsen Kwarasey	1	0	0	0	0	0	1	0
16	(Norway)	MF	Abdisalam Ibrahim	6	0	0	0	1	0	7	0
18	(Norway)	MF	Martin Ovenstad	2	0	1	0	0	0	3	0
22	(Ghana)	MF	Bismark Adjei-Boateng	5	0	0	0	1	0	6	0
26	(Norway)	DF	Lars Christopher Vilsvik	2	0	1	0	1	0	4	0
27	(Norway)	DF	Jarl André Storbæk	1	0	0	0	0	1	1	1
28	(Ghana)	DF	Razak Nuhu	1	0	0	0	1	0	2	0
92	(Norway)	FW	Ola Kamara	1	0	0	0	0	0	1	0
			TOTALS	45	3	3	0	7	1	55	4
