= 2012 Strømsgodset Toppfotball season =

Strømsgodset
2012 season
- Chairman: Erik Espeseth
- Manager: Ronny Deila
- Stadium: Marienlyst Stadion
- Tippeligaen: 2nd
- Norwegian Cup: Quarterfinals vs Brann
- Top goalscorer: League: Péter Kovács (14); All: Péter Kovács (22)
- Highest home attendance: 7,451 vs Vålerenga; 31 March 2012Molde; 21 October 2012Rosenborg; 4 November 2012
- Lowest home attendance: 4,726 vs Haugesund; 9 April 2012
- Average home league attendance: 6,607

The 2012 season was Strømsgodset's 6th season in Tippeligaen following their promotion back to the top flight in 2006. It was Ronny Deila's fifth season in charge and they finished 2nd in the Tippeligaen and were knocked out of the 2012 Norwegian Football Cup at the Quarterfinal stage by Brann.

== Squad ==
As of 13 March 2013

Note: Flags indicate national team as defined under FIFA eligibility rules; some limited exceptions apply. Players may hold more than one non-FIFA nationality.

No.	Pos.	Nation	Player
1	GK	NOR	Borger Thomas
2	DF	NOR	Mounir Hamoud
3	DF	NOR	Lars Sætra
4	DF	NOR	Kim André Madsen
6	DF	NOR	Alexander Aas
7	FW	NOR	Muhamed Keita
8	MF	NOR	Stefan Johansen
9	FW	NOR	Øyvind Storflor
10	FW	HUN	Péter Kovács
11	FW	NOR	Ola Kamara
12	GK	GHA	Adam Larsen
14	MF	NOR	Lars Iver Strand
15	FW	NOR	Adama Diomande
16	MF	NOR	Abdisalam Ibrahim (on loan from Manchester City)

No.	Pos.	Nation	Player
18	MF	NOR	Martin Ovenstad
19	FW	NOR	Gustav Wikheim
21	MF	GHA	Bismark Adjei-Boateng (on loan from Manchester City)
22	MF	GHA	Enock Kwakwa (on loan from Right to Dream Academy)
23	MF	NOR	Anders Konradsen
24	GK	NOR	Lars Cramer
25	FW	NOR	Tokmac Nguen
26	DF	NOR	Lars Christopher Vilsvik
27	DF	NOR	Jarl André Storbæk
28	DF	GHA	Razak Nuhu (on loan from Manchester City)
29	DF	NOR	Ole Amund Sveen
43	DF	NOR	Behajdin Celina
45	MF	NOR	Mads Gundersen
50	DF	NOR	Karanveer Grewal

== Transfers ==
=== Winter ===
In: Note: Flags indicate national team as defined under FIFA eligibility rules; some limited exceptions apply. Players may hold more than one non-FIFA nationality.

No.	Pos.	Nation	Player
10	FW	HUN	Péter Kovács (from (Belgium) Lierse)
14	MF	NOR	Lars Iver Strand (from (Norway) Vålerenga)

Out: Note: Flags indicate national team as defined under FIFA eligibility rules; some limited exceptions apply. Players may hold more than one non-FIFA nationality.

No.	Pos.	Nation	Player
1	GK	NOR	Lars Stubhaug (to (Norway) Hønefoss)

=== Summer ===
In: Note: Flags indicate national team as defined under FIFA eligibility rules; some limited exceptions apply. Players may hold more than one non-FIFA nationality.

No.	Pos.	Nation	Player
16	MF	NOR	Abdisalam Ibrahim (on loan from (England) Manchester City)
21	MF	GHA	Bismark Adjei-Boateng (on loan from (England) Manchester City)
22	MF	GHA	Enock Kwakwa (on loan from (Ghana) Right to Dream)
27	DF	NOR	Jarl André Storbæk (from (Denmark) SønderjyskE)

Out: Note: Flags indicate national team as defined under FIFA eligibility rules; some limited exceptions apply. Players may hold more than one non-FIFA nationality.

No.	Pos.	Nation	Player
21	MF	GHA	Mohammed Abu (loan return to (England) Manchester City)
27	MF	SLE	Alfred Sankoh (to (Turkey) Şanlıurfaspor)
—	MF	NOR	André Hanssen (retired)

== Competitions ==
=== Tippeligaen ===
==== Results summary ====
Overall								Home						Away					
Pld	W	D	L	GF	GA	GD	Pts	W	D	L	GF	GA	GD	W	D	L	GF	GA	GD
30	17	7	6	62	40	+22	58	12	3	0	39	12	+27	5	4	6	23	28	−5

==== Results by round ====
Round	1	2	3	4	5	6	7	8	9	10	11	12	13	14	15	16	17	18	19	20	21	22	23	24	25	26	27	28	29	30
Ground	A	H	H	A	H	A	H	A	H	A	H	A	H	A	H	A	H	A	A	H	A	H	A	H	A	H	A	H	A	H
Result	L	W	D	W	W	W	W	L	W	W	W	D	W	W	W	L	W	D	L	D	D	W	L	W	D	D	W	W	L	W
Position	13	8	8	3	3	1	1	2	1	1	1	2	1	1	1	1	1	1	1	2	1	1	2	2	3	3	3	2	2	2

Source: see below
A = Away; H = Home; W = Win; D = Draw; L = Loss

==== Results ====
23 March 2012 1	Molde	2–1	Strømsgodset	Molde
19:00 CET (UTC+1)	Angan 67'; Gatt 70'	Summary	Wikheim 86'	Stadium: Aker Stadion; Attendance: 9,052; Referee: Tommy Skjerven

31 March 2012 2	Strømsgodset	3–2	Vålerenga	Drammen
18:00 CEST (UTC+2)	Storflor 34'; Diomande 47'; Strand 90+2'	Summary	Pedersen 22'; Hæstad 36'	Stadium: Marienlyst Stadion; Attendance: 7,451; Referee: Svein Oddvar Moen

9 April 2012 3	Strømsgodset	3–3	Haugesund	Drammen
18:00 CEST (UTC+2)	Diomande 33'; Kamara 57' (pen.); Kovács 84'	Summary	Đurđić 18', 43'; Andreassen 86'	Stadium: Marienlyst Stadion; Attendance: 4,726; Referee: Espen Berntsen

15 April 2012 4	Brann	1–2	Strømsgodset	Bergen
18:00 CEST (UTC+2)	Kalvenes (yellow card) 8'; Ojo (yellow card) 35'; Barmen 90+2'	Summary	Kovács (yellow card) 32' (goal) 58'; Aas 41'	Stadium: Brann Stadion; Attendance: 12,940; Referee: Par Staberg

22 April 2012 5	Strømsgodset	1–0	Viking	Drammen
18:00 CEST (UTC+2)	Vilsvik 31' (pen.)	Summary		Stadium: Marienlyst Stadion; Attendance: 5,075; Referee: Brage Sandmoen

28 April 2012 6	Lillestrøm	0–1	Strømsgodset	Lillestrøm
16:00 CEST (UTC+2)	Knudtzon (yellow card) 7'	Summary	Abu (yellow card) 8'; Diomande 25' (yellow card) 76'	Stadium: Åråsen Stadion; Attendance: 6,245; Referee: Tom Hagen

6 May 2012 7	Strømsgodset	3–0	Sogndal	Drammen
18:00 CEST (UTC+2)	Sankoh 42'; Aas 60'; Diomande 81'	Summary		Stadium: Marienlyst Stadion; Attendance: 5,823; Referee: Svein Oddvar Moen

13 May 2012 8	Aalesund	3–1	Strømsgodset	Ålesund
18:00 CEST (UTC+2)	Barrantes 41'; Fuhre 43', 72'	Summary	Diomande 33'	Stadium: Color Line Stadion; Attendance: 8,394; Referee: Tommy Skjerven

16 May 2012 9	Strømsgodset	2–0	Tromsø	Drammen
18:00 CEST (UTC+2)	Konradsen 2'; Storflor 59'	Summary		Stadium: Marienlyst Stadion; Attendance: 6,390; Referee: Svein Erik Edvartsen

19 May 2012 10	Fredrikstad	2–3	Strømsgodset	Fredrikstad
16:00 CEST (UTC+2)	Aas 76'; Horn 80'	Summary	Kovács 41'; Abu 45+1', 79'	Stadium: Fredrikstad Stadion; Attendance: 7,055; Referee: Tommy Skjerven

23 May 2012 11	Strømsgodset	1–0	Odd Grenland	Drammen
19:00 CEST (UTC+2)	Aas 87'	Summary		Stadium: Marienlyst Stadion; Attendance: 5,290; Referee: Kjetil Sælen

24 June 2012 12	Rosenborg	3–3	Strømsgodset	Trondheim
18:00 CEST (UTC+2)	Sætra 4' (o.g.); Dočkal 45+1' (pen.), 77'	Summary	Kamara 44', 65', 74'	Stadium: Lerkendal Stadion; Attendance: 16,095; Referee: Svein Oddvar Moen

30 June 2012 13	Strømsgodset	4–0	Hønefoss	Drammen
18:00 CEST (UTC+2)	Keita 32'; Kamara 40', 48', 90+3'	Summary		Stadium: Marienlyst Stadion; Attendance: 5,564; Referee: Dag Vidar Hafsås

8 July 2012 14	Stabæk	1–2	Strømsgodset	Bærum
18:00 CEST (UTC+2)	Haugsdal 86'	Summary	Storflor 53'; Kovács 79'	Stadium: Nadderud Stadion; Attendance: 3,698; Referee: Tore Hansen

16 July 2012 15	Strømsgodset	2–1	Sandnes Ulf	Drammen
19:00 CEST (UTC+2)	Johansen 26'; Keita 50'; Madsen (yellow card) 28' (yellow-red card); Nuhu (red card) 87'	Summary	Aanestad 10'	Stadium: Marienlyst Stadion; Attendance: 5,378; Referee: Trygve Kjensli

22 July 2012 16	Odd Grenland	2–1	Strømsgodset	Skien
16:00 CEST (UTC+2)	Børven 34'; Aas 50' (o.g.)	Summary	Diomande 42'	Stadium: Skagerak Arena; Attendance: 5,677; Referee: Tommy Skjerven

27 July 2012 17	Strømsgodset	5–0	Fredrikstad	Drammen
19:00 CEST (UTC+2)	Johansen 18'; Kovács 56', 73'; Diomande 62'; Kamara 83'	Summary		Stadium: Marienlyst Stadion; Attendance: 5,374; Referee: Kjetil Sælen

4 August 2012 18	Hønefoss	1–1	Strømsgodset	Hønefoss
18:00 CEST (UTC+2)	Riski 9'	Summary	Storflor 88'	Stadium: Aka Arena; Attendance: 3,376; Referee: Per Ivar Staberg

12 August 2012 19	Tromsø	4–0	Strømsgodset	Tromsø
18:00 CEST (UTC+2)	Kristiansen 28'; Ciss 32'; Drage 44' (pen.); Ondrášek 90+1'	Summary		Stadium: Alfheim Stadion; Attendance: 4,349; Referee: Ola Hobber Nilsen

25 August 2012 20	Strømsgodset	3–3	Lillestrøm	Drammen
16:00 CEST (UTC+2)	Madsen (yellow card) 23'; Kovács (yellow card) 31' (goal) 42', 64'; Kwarasey (yellow card) 69'; Kamara 76' (pen.); Sætra (yellow card) 87'	Summary	Helstad 47'; Knudtzon 54'; Stoor (yellow card) 59'; Riise 70' (pen.); Moen (yellow card) 75'	Stadium: Marienlyst Stadion; Attendance: 6,420; Referee: Tom Hagen

2 September 2012 21	Sogndal	1–1	Strømsgodset	Sogndalsfjøra
19:00 CEST (UTC+2)	Santos 75'	Summary	Keita 73'	Stadium: Fosshaugane Campus; Attendance: 3,745; Referee: Per Ivar Staberg

14 September 2012 22	Strømsgodset	4–0	Aalesund	Drammen
19:00 CEST (UTC+2)	Kovács 24'; Johansen 39'; Nuhu 61'; Wikheim 86'	Summary		Stadium: Marienlyst Stadion; Attendance: 5,304; Referee: Tore Hansen

21 September 2012 23	Viking	3–2	Strømsgodset	Stavanger
19:00 CEST (UTC+2)	Olsen 35'; Thioune 58' (pen.); Berisha 77'	Summary	Ibrahim 56'; Vilsvik 75'	Stadium: Viking Stadion; Attendance: 8,959; Referee: Trond Ivar Døvle

30 September 2012 24	Strømsgodset	2–0	Brann	Drammen
19:00 CEST (UTC+2)	Vilsvik 55' (pen.); Kamara 73'	Summary	Wangberg (yellow card) 24'; Haugen (yellow card) 35'	Stadium: Marienlyst Stadion; Attendance: 6,478; Referee: Svein Moan

5 October 2012 25	Vålerenga	1–1	Strømsgodset	Oslo
19:00 CEST (UTC+2)	Anene 76'	Summary	Ibrahim 15'	Stadium: Ullevaal Stadion; Attendance: 10,807; Referee: Ken Henry Johnsen

21 October 2012 26	Strømsgodset	1–1	Molde	Drammen
18:00 CEST (UTC+2)	Konradsen (yellow card) 34'; Storbæk 90'	Summary	Berget 15'; Gatt (yellow card) 38'; Hestad (yellow card) 50'; Diouf (yellow card) 72'; Vatshaug (yellow card) 90+2'	Stadium: Marienlyst Stadion; Attendance: 7,451; Referee: Svein Edvartsen

26 October 2012 27	Haugesund	2–3	Strømsgodset	Haugesund
19:00 CEST (UTC+2)	Engblom 44'; Haukås 76'	Summary	Kovács 49', 90+5'; Storbæk 54'	Stadium: Haugesund Stadion; Attendance: 3,954; Referee: Ken Henry Johnsen

4 November 2012 28	Strømsgodset	2–1	Rosenborg	Drammen
19:00 CET (UTC+1)	Kamara 67'; Kovács 76'	Summary	Prica 64'	Stadium: Marienlyst Stadion; Attendance: 7,451; Referee: Tommy Skjerven

11 November 2012 29	Sandnes Ulf	2–1	Strømsgodset	Sandnes
18:00 CET (UTC+1)	Gytkjær 54'; Pepa 76'	Summary	Ibrahim 32'	Stadium: Sandnes Idrettspark; Attendance: 3,446; Referee: Dag Vidar Hafsås

18 November 2012 30	Strømsgodset	3–1	Stabæk	Drammen
18:00 CET (UTC+1)	Kamara 6'; Kovács 24', 88'	Summary	Gunnarsson 11'	Stadium: Marienlyst Stadion; Attendance: 7,333; Referee: Per Ivar Staberg

==== Table ====
Pos	Team	Pld	W	D	L	GF	GA	GD	Pts	Qualification or relegation
1	Molde (C)	30	19	5	6	51	31	+20	62	Qualification for the Champions League second qualifying round
2	Strømsgodset	30	17	7	6	62	40	+22	58	Qualification for the Europa League second qualifying round (Note: Hødd, which played in the 2012 First Division, also qualified for the 2013–14 UEFA Europa League second qualifying round as winners of the 2012 Norwegian Cup.)
3	Rosenborg	30	15	10	5	53	26	+27	55	Qualification for the Europa League first qualifying round (Note: Tromsø qualified for the first qualifying round of the UEFA Europa League via the UEFA Fair Play ranking.)
4	Tromsø	30	14	7	9	45	32	+13	49	Qualification for the Europa League first qualifying round
5	Viking	30	14	7	9	41	36	+5	49	

Source: fotball.no
Rules for classification: 1) points; 2) goal difference; 3) number of goals scored.
(C) Champions

=== Norwegian Cup ===
1 May 2012 First Round	Solberg	0–9	Strømsgodset	Solbergelva
18:00 CEST (UTC+2)		Summary	Kovács 19', 26', 53'; Vilsvik 33'; Keita 36', 60'; Storflor 55'; Sætra 68'; Konradsen 81'	Stadium: Solberg kunstgress Attendance: 2,200; Referee: Ole-Martin Loeshagen

9 May 2012 Second Round	Gjøvik	0–2	Strømsgodset	Gjøvik
18:00 CEST (UTC+2)		Summary	Kovács 24'; Johansen 45'	Stadium: Gjøvik Stadion; Attendance: 946; Referee: Christian Moen

20 June 2012 Third Round	Strømsgodset	3–2	Notodden	Drammen
18:00 CEST (UTC+2)	Storflor 45+3'; Kovács 76', 79'	Summary	S.Jenssen 14'; Dale 17'	Stadium: Marienlyst Stadion; Attendance: 5,582; Referee: Mads Ahlsen

4 July 2012 Fourth Round	Strømsgodset	6–1	Mjøndalen	Drammen
18:00 CEST (UTC+2)	Kovács 26'; Sankoh 42'; Konradsen 52', 63'; Kamara 85', 88'	Summary	Kirkevold 73'	Stadium: Marienlyst Stadion; Attendance: 6,045; Referee: Tommy Skjerven

19 August 2012 Quarter Final	Brann	4–3	Strømsgodset	Bergen
20:00 CEST (UTC+2)	Jonsson 44'; Nordkvelle 67'; Bentley 71'; Huseklepp 86' (pen.)	Summary	Kovács 22'; Ibrahim (yellow card) 43' (yellow-red card) 60'; Storflor 58'; Kwarasey (yellow card) 69'; Diomande 90+3'	Stadium: Brann Stadion; Attendance: 7,751; Referee: Svein Oddvar Moen

== Squad statistics ==
=== Appearances and goals ===
No.	Pos	Nat	Player	Total		Tippeligaen		Norwegian Cup	
No.	Pos	Nat	Player	Apps	Goals	Apps	Goals	Apps	Goals
2	DF	(Norway) NOR	Mounir Hamoud	12	0	7+4	0	1+0	0
3	DF	(Norway) NOR	Lars Sætra	15	1	11+2	0	2+0	1
4	DF	(Norway) NOR	Kim André Madsen	30	0	27+0	0	3+0	0
6	DF	(Norway) NOR	Alexander Aas	14	3	12+0	3	2+0	0
7	FW	(Norway) NOR	Muhamed Keita	24	5	16+3	3	3+2	2
8	MF	(Norway) NOR	Stefan Johansen	32	4	21+6	3	5+0	1
9	FW	(Norway) NOR	Øyvind Storflor	32	7	27+0	4	5+0	3
10	FW	(Hungary) HUN	Péter Kovács	33	22	22+6	14	4+1	8
11	FW	(Norway) NOR	Ola Kamara	33	14	19+9	12	3+2	2
12	GK	(Ghana) GHA	Adam Larsen	32	0	29+0	0	3+0	0
14	MF	(Norway) NOR	Lars Iver Strand	19	1	8+11	1	0+0	0
15	FW	(Norway) NOR	Adama Diomande	21	8	8+11	7	0+2	1
16	MF	(Norway) NOR	Abdisalam Ibrahim	12	3	9+2	3	1+0	0
18	MF	(Norway) NOR	Martin Ovenstad	5	0	0+4	0	0+1	0
19	FW	(Norway) NOR	Gustav Wikheim	11	2	3+6	2	1+1	0
22	MF	(Ghana) GHA	Bismark Adjei-Boateng	12	0	3+6	0	3+0	0
23	MF	(Norway) NOR	Anders Konradsen	33	4	23+5	1	5+0	3
24	GK	(Norway) NOR	Lars Cramer	3	0	1+0	0	2+0	0
25	FW	(Norway) NOR	Tokmac Nguen	1	0	0+1	0	0+0	0
26	DF	(Norway) NOR	Lars Christopher Vilsvik	35	4	30+0	3	5+0	1
27	DF	(Norway) NOR	Jarl André Storbæk	10	2	10+0	2	0+0	0
28	DF	(Ghana) GHA	Razak Nuhu	29	1	23+2	1	4+0	0
29	DF	(Norway) NOR	Ole Amund Sveen	7	0	0+2	0	4+1	0
45	MF	(Norway) NOR	Kim André Madsen	1	0	0+0	0	0+1	0
50	DF	(Norway) NOR	Karanveer Grewal	3	0	0+1	0	0+2	0
Players away from Strømsgodset on loan:
Players who left Strømsgodset during the season:
21	MF	(Ghana) GHA	Mohammed Abu	12	1	11+0	1	1+0	0
27	MF	(Sierra Leone) SLE	Alfred Sankoh	12	2	10+1	1	1+0	1

=== Goal scorers ===
Place	Position	Nation	Number	Name	Tippeligaen	Norwegian Cup	Total
1	FW	(Hungary)	10	Péter Kovács	14	8	22
2	FW	(Norway)	11	Ola Kamara	12	2	14
3	FW	(Norway)	15	Adama Diomande	7	1	8
4	FW	(Norway)	9	Øyvind Storflor	4	3	7
5	FW	(Norway)	7	Muhamed Keita	3	2	5
6	MF	(Norway)	23	Anders Konradsen	1	3	4
6	MF	(Norway)	8	Stefan Johansen	3	1	4
6	DF	(Norway)	26	Lars Christopher Vilsvik	3	1	4
9	DF	(Norway)	6	Alexander Aas	3	0	3
9	MF	(Norway)	16	Abdisalam Ibrahim	3	0	3
11	FW	(Norway)	19	Gustav Wikheim	2	0	2
11	MF	(Ghana)	21	Mohammed Abu	2	0	2
11	DF	(Norway)	27	Jarl André Storbæk	2	0	2
11	MF	(Sierra Leone)	27	Alfred Sankoh	1	1	2
15	DF	(Ghana)	28	Razak Nuhu	1	0	1
15	MF	(Norway)	14	Lars Iver Strand	1	0	1
15	DF	(Norway)	3	Lars Sætra	0	1	1
				TOTALS	62	23	85

=== Disciplinary record ===
Number	Nation	Position	Name	Tippeligaen		Norwegian Cup		Total	
Number	Nation	Position	Name	Yellow card	Red card	Yellow card	Red card	Yellow card	Red card
2	(Norway)	DF	Mounir Hamoud	1	0	0	0	1	0
3	(Norway)	DF	Lars Sætra	2	0	0	0	2	0
4	(Norway)	DF	Kim André Madsen	5	1	0	0	5	1
6	(Norway)	MF	Alexander Aas	1	0	0	0	1	0
7	(Norway)	FW	Muhamed Keita	2	0	0	0	2	0
8	(Norway)	MF	Stefan Johansen	4	0	0	0	4	0
9	(Norway)	FW	Øyvind Storflor	1	0	0	0	1	0
10	(Hungary)	FW	Péter Kovács	5	0	0	0	5	0
11	(Norway)	FW	Ola Kamara	1	0	0	0	1	0
12	(Ghana)	GK	Adam Larsen	2	0	0	0	2	0
14	(Norway)	MF	Lars Iver Strand	3	0	0	0	3	0
15	(Norway)	FW	Adama Diomande	1	0	0	0	1	0
16	(Norway)	MF	Abdisalam Ibrahim	1	0	2	1	3	1
21	(Norway)	MF	Mohammed Abu	1	0	0	0	1	0
22	(Ghana)	MF	Bismark Adjei-Boateng	1	0	0	0	1	0
23	(Norway)	MF	Anders Konradsen	2	0	0	0	2	0
26	(Norway)	DF	Lars Christopher Vilsvik	2	0	1	0	3	0
27	(Norway)	DF	Jarl André Storbæk	1	0	0	0	1	0
28	(Ghana)	DF	Razak Nuhu	3	1	0	0	3	1
			TOTALS	39	2	3	1	42	3
