= 2015 Strømsgodset Toppfotball season =

Strømsgodset
2015 season
- Chairman: Trond Esaiassen
- Manager: David Nielsen (-26 May); Bjørn Petter Ingebretsen (26 May-)
- Tippeligaen: 2nd
- Norwegian Cup: 3rd Round vs Kvik Halden
- Europa League: 3rd qualifying round vs Hajduk Split
- Top goalscorer: League: Iver Fossum (12); All: Iver Fossum (13)
- Highest home attendance: 8,468
- Lowest home attendance: 6,180
- Average home league attendance: 7,030

The 2015 season was Strømsgodset's 9th season in Tippeligaen following their promotion back to the top flight in 2006.

David Nielsen started the season as the manager, but was sacked after league round 10, having only secured 12 points. He was replaced by assistant manager Bjørn Petter Ingebretsen on 26 May 2015. Ingebretsen achieved immediate success, and took the team from 9th to 2nd after a 20-match run that secured 45 points.

In the cup they were knocked out by 2. divisjon side Kvik Halden on a penalty shootout in the third round. In the UEFA Europa League qualifications, they eliminated FK Partizani and FK Mladá Boleslav in the 1st and 2nd qualifying rounds, but lost 0–4 on aggregate versus Hajduk Split in the third qualifying round.

== Review and events ==
=== Pre-season transfers ===
Three important players left in the winter transfer window, as well as several players who had been on loan spells.

Former Ghana international Adam Larsen Kwarasey, who had been in the club since 2007, and was the first choice goalkeeper for the last five seasons, signed for Major League Soccer club Portland Timbers after his contract expired. He was replaced by the experienced former Norway international Espen Bugge Pettersen, who had become back-up goalkeeper at Molde in the two previous seasons.

In defence, former Norway international Jarl André Storbæk, who had arrived mid-season in 2012 and been crucial to the title win in 2013, left the club after his contract expired, to become playing assistant manager for Nybergsund. He was replaced by French left back Florent Hanin, who had been released by Lierse.

The 16-year-old Norway international Martin Ødegaard was sold to Real Madrid for the record selling fee of 35 million NOK (which could rise to 70 million NOK).

=== Pre-season ===
Strømsgodset went on two training tours abroad. On 30 January, they played 0–0 in a Copa X match vs Dinamo Zagreb at La Manga, Murcia. On 6 February, they won 3–1 against Hammarby in the same cup and location.

Next, the team moved to Belek, Turkey, where they played three friendlies. They won 2–1 against CSKA Sofia on 15 February, lost 0–1 to Spartak Moscow on 21 February and lost 1–3 to Torpedo Moscow on 25 February.

In March, Strømsgodset played four friendlies on home soil against Norwegian teams. They lost 3–5 in an away match against Odd at Skagerak Arena on 6 March, having trailed 1–5 at half-time. On 14 March, they won 3–0 at home to newly promoted Sandefjord, and repeated the score against Vålerenga one week later, when Iver Fossum scored a hattrick. Their final pre-season friendly was a 2–1 away win at Lillestrøm.

=== Season ===
==== League ====
Strømsgodset had a difficult start of the season, with away games at four of the best teams from the 2014 Tippeligaen in the first five away matches. They also hosted the long-awaited derby vs rivals Mjøndalen IF in the first home game. After just one win in the first six rounds, Strømsgodset was at 13th place in the league. After two home wins and two away losses, manager David Nielsen was fired from his job, and assistant Bjørn Petter Ingebretsen, also known as «BP», was hired as interim manager for the remainder of the season.

Ingebretsen had more luck, and the team won five of their next six matches in the league, rising to 6th position in the table after half the season had been played. The team went undefeated for the eleven final games of the season, and secured the silver medals.

==== Norwegian Cup ====
In the cup, Strømsgodset easily won the First and Second Round matches against FK Tønsberg and Kjelsås Fotball, 5–0 and 4–0, respectively. After a goalless draw in the Third Round, Strømsgodset were surprisingly eliminated by Kvik Halden on a 2-4 penalty shootout. The latter club thus won its third match on penalties, and advanced to the Fourth Round, whereas Strømsgodset yet again failed to advance from the Third Round.

==== Europe ====
Through their 4th place in 2014 Tippeligaen, Strømsgodset had secured a spot in the first qualifying round of the 2015–16 UEFA Europa League. On 22 June 2015, Strømsgodset was drawn against Albanian club FK Partizani Tirana, who had qualified through their 3rd place in the 2014–15 Albanian Superliga. The original draw had the Albanians playing at home first, but this was reversed by UEFA due to security reasons. The first leg, played at home on 2 July, ended with a 3–1 win to Strømsgodset. The second leg ended with a 1–0 win for Strømsgodset, after a late goal by Petter Vaagan Moen.

FK Mladá Boleslav awaited in the 2nd qualifying round. After a 2–1 win away, the 0–1 home defeat meant that Strømsgodset advanced to the third round on the away goals rule. They faced Hajduk Split, but were eliminated win 0–2 defeats both away and home.

== Friendlies ==
30 January 2015 Copa X	Dinamo Zagreb (Croatia)	0–0	(Norway) Strømsgodset	La Manga, Spain
18:00 CET (UTC+01:00)		Report		Stadium: La Manga Stadium

6 February 2015 Copa X	Hammarby (Sweden)	1–3	(Norway) Strømsgodset	La Manga, Spain
18:00 CET (UTC+01:00)	Bakircioglü 24'	Report	Nguen 1'; Lehne Olsen 49'; Fossum 61'	Stadium: La Manga Stadium

15 February 2015 Friendly	Strømsgodset (Norway)	2–1	(Bulgaria) CSKA Sofia	Belek, Turkey
16:00 CET (UTC+01:00)	Kastrati 18'; Vilsvik 54' (pen.)	Report	Joachim 25' (pen.)

21 February 2015 Friendly	Strømsgodset (Norway)	0–1	(Russia) Spartak Moscow	Belek, Turkey
14:30 CET (UTC+01:00)		Report	Kombarov 47' (pen.)

25 February 2015 Friendly	Strømsgodset (Norway)	1–3	(Russia) Torpedo Moscow	Belek, Turkey
16:30 CET (UTC+01:00)	Lehne Olsen 53'	Report	Mirzov 10'; Rykov 32'; Rykov 53'

6 March 2015 Friendly	Odd	5–3	Strømsgodset	Skien
14:00 CET (UTC+01:00)	Occéan 22'; Occéan 28'; Occéan 29'; Samuelsen 40'; Occéan 42'	Report	Kastrati 18'; Lehne Olsen 81' (pen.); Wikheim 85'	Stadium: Skagerak Arena

14 March 2015 Friendly	Strømsgodset	3–0	Sandefjord	Drammen
18:00 CET (UTC+01:00)	Ogunjimi 42'; Kastrati 55'; Kovács 84'	Report		Stadium: Marienlyst Stadion; Attendance: 3,600

21 March 2015 Friendly	Strømsgodset	3–0	Vålerenga	Drammen
18:00 CET (UTC+01:00)	Fossum 49'; Fossum 55'; Fossum 70'	Report		Stadium: Marienlyst Stadion

21 March 2015 Friendly	Lillestrøm	1–2	Strømsgodset	Lillestrøm
18:00 CET (UTC+01:00)	Fofana 53' (pen.)	Report	Lehne Olsen 70'; Lehne Olsen 74'	Stadium: LSK-Hallen

== Competitions ==
=== Tippeligaen ===
==== Results summary ====
Overall								Home						Away					
Pld	W	D	L	GF	GA	GD	Pts	W	D	L	GF	GA	GD	W	D	L	GF	GA	GD
30	17	6	7	67	44	+23	57	10	4	1	34	17	+17	7	2	6	33	27	+6

Last updated: 8 November 2015.
Source: see below

==== Results by round ====
Round	1	2	3	4	5	6	7	8	9	10	11	12	13	14	15	16	17	18	19	20	21	22	23	24	25	26	27	28	29	30
Ground	A	H	A	H	A	H	A	A	H	A	H	A	H	A	H	A	H	A	H	A	H	A	H	A	H	A	H	H	A	H
Result	L	D	D	W	L	D	W	L	W	L	W	W	W	L	W	W	W	W	L	L	W	W	W	D	W	W	W	D	W	D
Position	14	11	12	10	12	13	9	11	9	9	9	8	7	8	6	5	5	4	5	5	5	4	4	5	3	3	3	2	2	2

Updated to match(es) played on 8 November 2015. Source: see below
A = Away; H = Home; W = Win; D = Draw; L = Loss

==== Results ====
6 April 2015 1	Vålerenga	3–1	Strømsgodset	Oslo
19:00 CEST (UTC+02:00)	Grindheim 14'; Fredheim Holm 39' (pen.); Larsen (yellow card) 43'; Gunnarsson 70'; Braaten (yellow card) 83'	Report	Horn (yellow card) 16'; Wæhler 37' (o.g.); Vilsvik (yellow card) 58'; Wikheim (yellow card) 84'	Stadium: Ullevaal Stadion; Attendance: 14,821; Referee: Svein-Erik Edvartsen

11 April 2015 2	Strømsgodset	1–1	Mjøndalen	Drammen
18:00 CEST (UTC+02:00)	Hamoud 31'; Kastrati (yellow card) 44'	Report	Midtgarden 8'; Sundli (yellow card) 45'; Forn (yellow card) 49'; Olsen Solberg (yellow card) 60'	Stadium: Marienlyst Stadion; Attendance: 8,468; Referee: Svein Oddvar Moen

18 April 2015 3	Rosenborg	1–1	Strømsgodset	Trondheim
18:00 CEST (UTC+02:00)	Mikkelsen 6'; Selnæs (yellow card) 90'	Report	Kovács 78'; Ovenstad (yellow card) 23'; Hamoud (yellow card) 30'; Kovács (yellow card) 90'	Stadium: Lerkendal Stadion; Attendance: 19,869; Referee: Ken Henry Johnsen

26 April 2015 4	Strømsgodset	3–2	Sandefjord	Drammen
18:00 CEST (UTC+02:00)	Lehne Olsen 20'; Storflor 28'; Storflor 38'; Storflor (yellow card) 77'	Report	Kirkevold 33'; Hansen 90'	Stadium: Marienlyst Stadion; Attendance: 6,412; Referee: Espen Berntsen

29 April 2015 5	Molde	3–1	Strømsgodset	Molde
19:00 CEST (UTC+02:00)	Kamara 32'; Elyounoussi 45'; Elyounoussi 82'	Report	Kovács 13'; Wikheim (yellow card) 42'; Abu (yellow card) 50'	Stadium: Aker Stadion; Attendance: 8,512; Referee: Svein Oddvar Moen

2 May 2015 6	Strømsgodset	1–1	Sarpsborg 08	Drammen
18:00 CEST (UTC+02:00)	Fossum 23'; Ovenstad (yellow card) 85'	Report	Tokstad 16'; Heieren Hansen (yellow card) 52'; Askar (yellow card) 67'; Trondsen (yellow card) 73'	Stadium: Marienlyst Stadion; Attendance: 6,954; Referee: Dag Vidar Hafsås

10 May 2015 7	Bodø/Glimt	3–5	Strømsgodset	Bodø
18:00 CEST (UTC+02:00)	Moe 9'; Ndiaye 32'; Olsen 67'	Report	Nana 5'; Sørum 20'; Storflor 28'; Wikheim (yellow card) 39'; Wikheim 43'; Nana (yellow card) 69'; Valsvik (yellow card) 81'; Kastrati 88'	Stadium: Aspmyra Stadion; Attendance: 2,387; Referee: Tommy Skjerven

13 May 2015 8	Odd	2–0	Strømsgodset	Skien
18:00 CEST (UTC+02:00)	Samuelsen 42'; Bentley 62'	Report	Nana (yellow card) 69'	Stadium: Skagerak Arena; Attendance: 8,101; Referee: Ola Hobber Nilsen

16 May 2015 9	Strømsgodset	3–1	Aalesund	Drammen
18:00 CEST (UTC+02:00)	Fossum 33'; Sørum 37'; Fossum 74'; Bugge Pettersen (yellow card) 85'	Report	Latifu 59'	Stadium: Marienlyst Stadion; Attendance: 7,409; Referee: Ken Henry Johnsen

24 May 2015 10	Haugesund	4–0	Strømsgodset	Haugesund
18:00 CEST (UTC+02:00)	Bjørnbak 12'; Diedhiou 34'; Diedhiou 71'; Bamberg 89'	Report	Nana (yellow card) 44'; Kovács (yellow card) 46'; Wikheim (yellow card) 75'	Stadium: Haugesund Stadion; Attendance: 5,726; Referee: Anders Johansen

31 May 2015 11	Strømsgodset	2–0	Lillestrøm	Drammen
15:30 CEST (UTC+02:00)	Wikheim 49'; Fossum 86'	Report	Innocent (yellow card) 23'; Amundsen (yellow card) 67'; Knudtzon (yellow card) 78'; Innocent (yellow card) 83' (yellow-red card); Fofana (yellow card) 88'	Stadium: Marienlyst Stadion; Attendance: 6,610; Referee: Svein Oddvar Moen

7 June 2015 12	Start	0–1	Strømsgodset	Kristiansand
18:00 CEST (UTC+02:00)	Christensen (yellow card) 63'	Report	Vilsvik (yellow card) 61'; Fossum 71'	Stadium: Sør Arena; Attendance: 9,239; Referee: Tommy Skjerven

21 June 2015 13	Strømsgodset	2–1	Tromsø	Drammen
18:00 CEST (UTC+02:00)	Ogunjimi 4'; Vilsvik (yellow card) 60'; Vilsvik 67'	Report	Ondrášek 88'	Stadium: Marienlyst Stadion; Attendance: 6,708; Referee: Tore Hansen

27 June 2015 14	Stabæk	3–2	Strømsgodset	Bærum
20:00 CEST (UTC+02:00)	Meling 22'; Asante 40'; El Ghanassy 58'; Gorozia (yellow card) 60'	Report	Ogunjimi 46'; Abu (yellow card) 47'; Wikheim 49'; Ogunjimi (yellow card) 58'; Hanin (yellow card) 58'; Abu (yellow card) 82' (yellow-red card)	Stadium: Nadderud Stadion; Attendance: 3,923; Referee: Ken Henry Johnsen

5 July 2015 15	Strømsgodset	4–1	Viking	Drammen
15:30 CEST (UTC+02:00)	Ogunjimi 10'; Ogunjimi 15'; Nana (red card) 45'; Wikheim 60'; Vilsvik 78'	Report	Abdullahi 4'	Stadium: Marienlyst Stadion; Attendance: 7,019; Referee: Martin Lundby

12 July 2015 16	Lillestrøm	1–2	Strømsgodset	Lillestrøm
20:00 CEST (UTC+02:00)	Fofana 58' (pen.); Lundemo (yellow card) 80'; Origi (yellow card) 90'	Report	Abu (yellow card) 37'; Kastrati 52'; Kastrati (yellow card) 78'; Wikheim 86'	Stadium: Åråsen Stadion; Attendance: 4,472; Referee: Tom Harald Hagen

2 August 2015 18	Tromsø	0–6	Strømsgodset	Tromsø
18:00 CEST (UTC+02:00)	Wangberg (yellow card) 89'; Wangberg (yellow card) 90' (yellow-red card)	Report	Wikheim 6'; Vilsvik 29'; Lehne Olsen (yellow card) 30'; Wikheim 48'; Hanin 50'; Fossum 66'; Fossum 76'	Stadium: Alfheim Stadion; Attendance: 3,418; Referee: Trygve Kjensli

9 August 2015 19	Strømsgodset	0–2	Stabæk	Drammen
18:00 CEST (UTC+02:00)	Vilsvik (yellow card) 42'; Wikheim (yellow card) 83'	Report	Diomande 54'; Diomande 76'	Stadium: Marienlyst Stadion; Attendance: 6,661; Referee: Dag Vidar Hafsås

14 August 2015 20	Aalesund	2–1	Strømsgodset	Ålesund
19:00 CEST (UTC+02:00)	Bjørdal 25'; Riise (yellow card) 48'; Skagestad (yellow card) 59'; Abdellaoue 62'	Report	Jradi (yellow card) 38'; Jradi 46'; Pedersen (yellow card) 81'	Stadium: Color Line Stadion; Attendance: 6,388; Referee: Trygve Kjensli

23 August 2015 21	Strømsgodset	2–1	Start	Drammen
18:00 CEST (UTC+02:00)	Hammer 43' (o.g.); Pedersen 64' (pen.)	Report	Vikstøl 7'; Aase (yellow card) 29'; Christensen (yellow card) 81'; Stokkelien (yellow card) 90'	Stadium: Marienlyst Stadion; Attendance: 6,433; Referee: Svein Oddvar Moen

30 August 2015 22	Mjøndalen	2–4	Strømsgodset	Mjøndalen
18:00 CEST (UTC+02:00)	Aasmundsen 47'; Pellegrino 50'	Report	Pedersen 14'; Wikheim (yellow card) 32'; Fossum 41'; Pedersen (yellow card) 45'; Pedersen 90'; Pedersen 90'	Stadium: Isachsen Stadion; Attendance: 4,139; Referee: Svein-Erik Edvartsen

11 September 2015 23	Strømsgodset	5–0	Haugesund	Drammen
19:00 CEST (UTC+02:00)	Horn (yellow card) 9'; Vilsvik 23'; Tagbajumi 27'; Tagbajumi 32'; Nana 40'; Abu 74'	Report	Kiss (yellow card) 14'; Christensen (yellow card) 22'; Bamberg (yellow card) 52'	Stadium: Marienlyst Stadion; Attendance: 6,180; Referee: Tore Hansen

18 September 2015 24	Viking	1–1	Strømsgodset	Stavanger
19:00 CEST (UTC+02:00)	Jørgensen (yellow card) 53'; Adegbenro 78'; Mets (yellow card) 90'	Report	Fossum 15'; Horn (yellow card) 38'; Nana (yellow card) 57'; Tagbajumi (yellow card) 90'	Stadium: Viking Stadion; Attendance: 14,463; Referee: Ola Hobber Nilsen

23 September 2015 17	Strømsgodset	1–0	Molde	Drammen
18:00 CEST (UTC+02:00)	Pedersen 18'; Abu (yellow card) 27'; Madsen (yellow card) 58'	Report	Toivio (yellow card) 32'	Stadium: Marienlyst Stadion; Attendance: 6,502; Referee: Martin Lundby

26 September 2015 25	Strømsgodset	3–1	Bodø/Glimt	Drammen
18:00 CEST (UTC+02:00)	Valsvik (yellow card) 23'; Hanin (yellow card) 53'; Londak 62' (o.g.); Pedersen 87'; Tagbajumi 89'	Report	Valentin (yellow card) 20'; Konradsen 90'	Stadium: Marienlyst Stadion; Attendance: 6,352; Referee: Svein-Erik Edvartsen

3 October 2015 26	Sarpsborg 08	1–6	Strømsgodset	Sarpsborg
15:30 CEST (UTC+02:00)	Kovács (yellow card) 30'; Groven (yellow card) 42'; Askar 53'	Report	Wikheim 18'; Storflor 37'; Horn (yellow card) 48'; Fossum 49'; Wikheim 56'; Jradi 49'; Sørum 49'	Stadium: Sarpsborg Stadion; Attendance: 4,172; Referee: Ole Gya

16 October 2015 27	Strømsgodset	2–1	Odd	Drammen
19:00 CEST (UTC+02:00)	Horn (yellow card) 24'; Pedersen 33'; Fossum 40'; Pedersen (yellow card) 57'	Report	Diouf 86'	Stadium: Marienlyst Stadion; Attendance: 6,806; Referee: Svein Oddvar Moen

25 October 2015 28	Strømsgodset	3–3	Rosenborg	Drammen
19:00 CEST (UTC+02:00)	Pedersen (yellow card) 12'; Pedersen 15'; Nana 22'; Abu (yellow card) 27'; Pedersen 37'; Madsen (yellow card) 42'; Jradi (yellow card) 80'	Report	Konradsen 8'; Mikkelsen (yellow card) 36'; Konradsen 51'; De Lanlay 59'	Stadium: Marienlyst Stadion; Attendance: 8,468; Referee: Tore Hansen

1 November 2015 29	Sandefjord	1–2	Strømsgodset	Sandefjord
18:00 CET (UTC+01:00)	Offenberg (yellow card) 64'; Mendy 85' (pen.)	Report	Tagbajumi 6'; Nana 21'; Lehne Olsen (yellow card) 90'	Stadium: Komplett.no Arena; Attendance: 4,153; Referee: Trond Ivar Døvle

8 November 2015 30	Strømsgodset	2–2	Vålerenga	Drammen
18:00 CET (UTC+01:00)	Pedersen 1'; Pedersen 41'; Horn (yellow card) 90'	Report	Hallberg 61'; Zahid 74'; Grindheim (yellow card) 78'	Stadium: Marienlyst Stadion; Attendance: 8,468; Referee: Svein Oddvar Moen

==== Table ====
Pos	Team	Pld	W	D	L	GF	GA	GD	Pts	Qualification or relegation
1	Rosenborg (C)	30	21	6	3	73	27	+46	69	Qualification for the Champions League second qualifying round (Note: Rosenborg qualified for the Europa League second qualifying round by winning the 2015 Norwegian Cup. However, since they already qualified for European competition based on their league position, the spot awarded to the cup winners was passed down the league.)
2	Strømsgodset	30	17	6	7	67	44	+23	57	Qualification for the Europa League second qualifying round
3	Stabæk	30	17	5	8	54	43	+11	56	Qualification for the Europa League first qualifying round
4	Odd	30	15	10	5	61	41	+20	55	Qualification for the Europa League first qualifying round
5	Viking	30	17	2	11	53	39	+14	53	

Source: Football Association of Norway (in Norwegian), Soccerway
Rules for classification: 1) Points; 2) Goal difference; 3) Goals scored; 4) Head-to-head points; 5) Head-to-head goal difference; 6) Head-to-head away goals scored (between two teams).
(C) Champions

=== Norwegian Cup ===
24 April 2015 1	FK Tønsberg	0–5	Strømsgodset	Tønsberg
20:00 CEST (UTC+02:00)		Report	Jradi (yellow card) 32'; Jradi 43'; Storflor 46'; Vaagan Moen 70'; Høibråten (yellow card) 71'; Kovács 80'; Abu 84'	Stadium: Tønsberg Gressbane; Referee: Rune Nilsen

7 May 2015 2	Kjelsås	0–4	Strømsgodset	Oslo
18:00 CEST (UTC+02:00)	Osmunddalen (yellow card) 2'; Frøystveit (yellow card) 60'; Bjørnsen Garnås (yellow card) 90'	Report	Kovács (yellow card) 29'; Nana 46'; Fossum 52'; Lehne Olsen 79'; Kovács 59'	Stadium: Grefsen stadion Attendance: 802; Referee: Espen Eskås

3 June 2015 3	Kvik Halden	0–0 (a.e.t.) (4–2 p)	Strømsgodset	Halden
18:00 CEST (UTC+02:00)	Hoel Andersen (yellow card) 34'	Report	Hamoud (yellow card) 36'; Høibråten (yellow card) 111'	Stadium: Halden stadion Attendance: 1,457; Referee: Martin Lundby
	Penalties
	Hoel Andersen (penalty scored); Strømsborg (penalty scored); Taletovic (penalty scored); Suka-Suka (penalty missed); Engebretsen (penalty scored)		(penalty scored) Fossum; (penalty scored) Nguen; (penalty missed) Ogunjimi; (penalty missed) Wikheim

=== Europa League ===
==== Qualifying rounds ====
2 July 2015 First qualifying round 1st leg	Strømsgodset (Norway)	3–1	(Albania) Partizani Tirana	Drammen, Norway
19:00 CEST (UTC+02:00)	Vilsvik 21'; Hanin (yellow card) 53'; Ogunjimi 66'; Vilsvik 73'; Abu (yellow card) 86'	Report	Račić (yellow card) 44'; Batha (yellow card) 45'; Fazliu 68'	Stadium: Marienlyst Stadion; Attendance: 3,273; Referee: Paul McLaughlin (Republic of Ireland)

9 July 2015 First qualifying round 2nd leg	Partizani Tirana (Albania)	0–1 (1–4 agg.)	(Norway) Strømsgodset	Tirana, Albania
20:00 CEST (UTC+02:00)	Batha (yellow card) 59'	Report	Kastrati (yellow card) 33'; Wikheim (yellow card) 45+2'; Ovenstad (yellow card) 55'; Ogunjimi (yellow card) 85'; Moen 90+3'	Stadium: Qemal Stafa National Stadium; Attendance: 4,200; Referee: Tobias Stieler (Germany)

16 July 2015 Second qualifying round 1st leg	Mladá Boleslav (Czech Republic)	1–2	(Norway) Strømsgodset	Mladá Boleslav, Czech Republic
19:00 CEST (UTC+02:00)	Bartl 39'; Kysela (yellow card) 70'; Křapka (yellow card) 76'; Mendy (yellow card) 83'; Magera (yellow card) 88'	Report	Sørum 44'; Jradi 85'	Stadium: Městský stadion Attendance: 4,756; Referee: John Beaton (Scotland)

23 July 2015 Second qualifying round 2nd leg	Strømsgodset (Norway)	0–1 (2a–2 agg.)	(Czech Republic) Mladá Boleslav	Drammen, Norway
19:00 CEST (UTC+02:00)	Madsen (yellow card) 45'; Wikheim (yellow card) 83'	Report	Čermák 31'; Malpon (yellow card) 18'; Čermák (yellow card) 67'; Veselovsky (yellow card) 83'; Magera (yellow card) 84'	Stadium: Marienlyst Stadion; Attendance: 4,371; Referee: Aleksei Nikolaev (Russia)

30 July 2015 Third qualifying round 1st leg	Hajduk Split (Croatia)	2–0	(Norway) Strømsgodset	Split, Croatia
21:00 CEST (UTC+02:00)	Balić 67'; Kiš 90+3'	Report	Hamoud (yellow card) 5'; Madsen (yellow card) 52'; Kastrati (yellow card) 65'; Jradi (yellow card) 79'; Vaagan Moen (yellow card) 90'	Stadium: Stadion Poljud; Attendance: 28,000; Referee: Kristo Tohver (Estonia)

6 August 2015 Third qualifying round 2nd leg	Strømsgodset (Norway)	0–2 (0–4 agg.)	(Croatia) Hajduk Split	Drammen, Norway
19:00 CEST (UTC+02:00)	Høibråten (yellow card) 85'	Report	Nižić (yellow card) 11'; Nižić (yellow card) 53' (yellow-red card); Caktaš 55'; Kiš (yellow card) 55'; Ohandza 77'	Stadium: Marienlyst Stadion; Attendance: 5,330; Referee: Oliver Drachta (Austria)

== Player details ==
As of 8 November 2015

No.	Pos	Nat	Player	Total		Tippeligaen		Norwegian Cup		Europa League	
No.	Pos	Nat	Player	Apps	Goals	Apps	Goals	Apps	Goals	Apps	Goals
1	GK	(Norway) NOR	Espen Bugge Pettersen	39	0	30	0	3	0	6	0
2	DF	(Norway) NOR	Mounir Hamoud	18	1	12	1	2	0	4	0
4	DF	(Norway) NOR	Kim André Madsen	11	0	7	0	0	0	4	0
5	DF	(Norway) NOR	Jørgen Horn	16	0	14	0	2	0	0	0
6	DF	(France) FRA	Florent Hanin	30	1	26	1	1	0	3	0
7	FW	(Denmark) DEN	Bassel Jradi	18	4	12	2	2	1	4	1
8	MF	(Norway) NOR	Petter Vaagan Moen	11	2	6	0	1	1	4	1
9	FW	(Norway) NOR	Øyvind Storflor	32	5	27	4	1	1	4	0
10	FW	(Hungary) HUN	Péter Kovács	14	4	10	2	3	2	1	0
10	FW	(Norway) NOR	Marcus Pedersen	10	11	10	11	0	0	0	0
11	MF	(Norway) NOR	Martin Rønning Ovenstad	31	0	27	0	1	0	3	0
12	GK	(Norway) NOR	Borger Thomas	0	0	0	0	0	0	0	0
13	GK	(Norway) NOR	Anders Gundersen	0	0	0	0	0	0	0	0
14	MF	(Norway) NOR	Iver Fossum	38	13	30	12	2	1	6	0
15	FW	(Kosovo) KOS	Flamur Kastrati	29	2	21	2	2	0	6	0
17	FW	(Norway) NOR	Thomas Lehne Olsen	13	2	7	1	2	1	4	0
18	DF	(Norway) NOR	Henrik Bredeli	1	0	0	0	1	0	0	0
19	FW	(Norway) NOR	Gustav Wikheim	37	9	28	9	3	0	6	0
20	MF	(Ghana) GHA	Mohammed Abu	36	2	27	1	3	1	6	0
21	MF	(Norway) NOR	Mathias Gjerstrøm	1	0	1	0	0	0	0	0
22	MF	(Ghana) GHA	Bismark Adjei-Boateng	25	5	21	4	3	1	1	0
23	FW	(Norway) NOR	Thomas Sørum	17	4	12	3	0	0	5	1
26	DF	(Norway) NOR	Lars Vilsvik	33	6	24	4	3	0	6	2
28	DF	(Norway) NOR	Marius Høibråten	21	0	15	0	3	0	3	0
30	GK	(Poland) POL	Łukasz Jarosiński	0	0	0	0	0	0	0	0
33	FW	(Nigeria) NGA	Marco Tagbajumi	10	4	10	4	0	0	0	0
40	GK	(Norway) NOR	Morten Sætra	0	0	0	0	0	0	0	0
49	DF	(Norway) NOR	Harald Danielsen	0	0	0	0	0	0	0	0
54	MF	(Norway) NOR	Knut Ahlander	0	0	0	0	0	0	0	0
58	DF	(Norway) NOR	Christopher Lindquist	0	0	0	0	0	0	0	0
61	DF	(Norway) NOR	William Nessjøen Solheim	0	0	0	0	0	0	0	0
62	FW	(Norway) NOR	Rasmus Gjemmestad	0	0	0	0	0	0	0	0
71	DF	(Norway) NOR	Gustav Valsvik	36	0	29	0	2	0	5	0
75	FW	(Belgium) BEL	Marvin Ogunjimi	11	5	8	4	1	0	2	1
93	FW	(Norway) NOR	Tokmac Nguen	2	0	1	0	1	0	0	0
–			Own goal	0	1	0	1	0	0	0	0

== Transfers ==
=== Winter ===
In: Note: Flags indicate national team as defined under FIFA eligibility rules; some limited exceptions apply. Players may hold more than one non-FIFA nationality.

No.	Pos.	Nation	Player
1	GK	NOR	Espen Bugge Pettersen (from (Norway) Molde)
6	DF	FRA	Florent Hanin (free agent)
8	MF	NOR	Petter Vaagan Moen (from (Norway) Lillestrøm)
12	GK	NOR	Borger Thomas (loan return from (Norway) Stabæk)
17	FW	NOR	Thomas Lehne Olsen (loan return from (Norway) Ull/Kisa)
18	DF	NOR	Henrik Bredeli (promoted)
58	DF	NOR	Christoffer Lindquist (promoted)
92	MF	NOR	Tokmac Nguen (loan return from (Norway) Bærum)
—	FW	NOR	Abdul-Basit Agouda (from (Norway) Skeid)

Out: Note: Flags indicate national team as defined under FIFA eligibility rules; some limited exceptions apply. Players may hold more than one non-FIFA nationality.

No.	Pos.	Nation	Player
3	DF	USA	Jeb Brovsky (loan return to (United States) New York City FC)
6	MF	NOR	Simen Brenne (released)
12	GK	GHA	Adam Larsen Kwarasey (to (United States) Portland Timbers)
16	MF	NOR	Martin Ødegaard (to (Spain) Real Madrid)
18	MF	GHA	Divine Naah (loan return to (England) Manchester City)
27	DF	NOR	Jarl-André Storbæk (to (Norway) Nybergsund IL-Trysil)
30	GK	NOR	Hermann Rhodén (to (Norway) Drammen FK)
44	DF	MKD	Stefan Aškovski (loan return to (Serbia) Partizan)
90	MF	DEN	Patrick Olsen (loan return to (Italy) Inter)
—	FW	NOR	Abdul-Basit Agouda (on loan to (Norway) Skeid)

=== Summer ===
In: Note: Flags indicate national team as defined under FIFA eligibility rules; some limited exceptions apply. Players may hold more than one non-FIFA nationality.

No.	Pos.	Nation	Player
10	FW	NOR	Marcus Pedersen (from (Norway) Brann)
30	GK	POL	Łukasz Jarosiński (from (Norway) Hønefoss)
33	FW	NGA	Marco Tagbajumi (on loan from (Cyprus) Limassol)
—	FW	NOR	Abdul-Basit Agouda (loan return from (Norway) Skeid)

Out: Note: Flags indicate national team as defined under FIFA eligibility rules; some limited exceptions apply. Players may hold more than one non-FIFA nationality.

No.	Pos.	Nation	Player
10	FW	HUN	Péter Kovács (to (Norway) Sarpsborg 08)
12	GK	NOR	Borger Thomas (on loan to (Norway) HamKam)
13	GK	NOR	Anders Gundersen (on loan to (Norway) Sandefjord)
58	DF	NOR	Christoffer Lindquist (on loan to Hønefoss)
93	FW	NOR	Tokmac Nguen (on loan to (Norway) Mjøndalen)

== Team kit ==
The official kit manufacturer for Strømsgodset is Diadora. This is the final year of the five-year-deal from 2011. The home shirt is deep blue, while the shorts and socks are white. The away kit has the reverse colours, with a white shirt and deep blue shorts and socks.

The main sponsor since June 2014 is the nationwide bank DNB in June.

2015 home colours	2015 away colours

== See also ==
Associated Wikipedia articles

- 2015 in Norwegian football
