= Storbæk =

Storbæk is a Norwegian surname. Notable people with the surname include:

- Håvard Storbæk (born 1986), Norwegian football player
- Jarl André Storbæk (born 1978), Norwegian football player
