= Gustav Wikheim =

Norwegian footballer (born 1993)

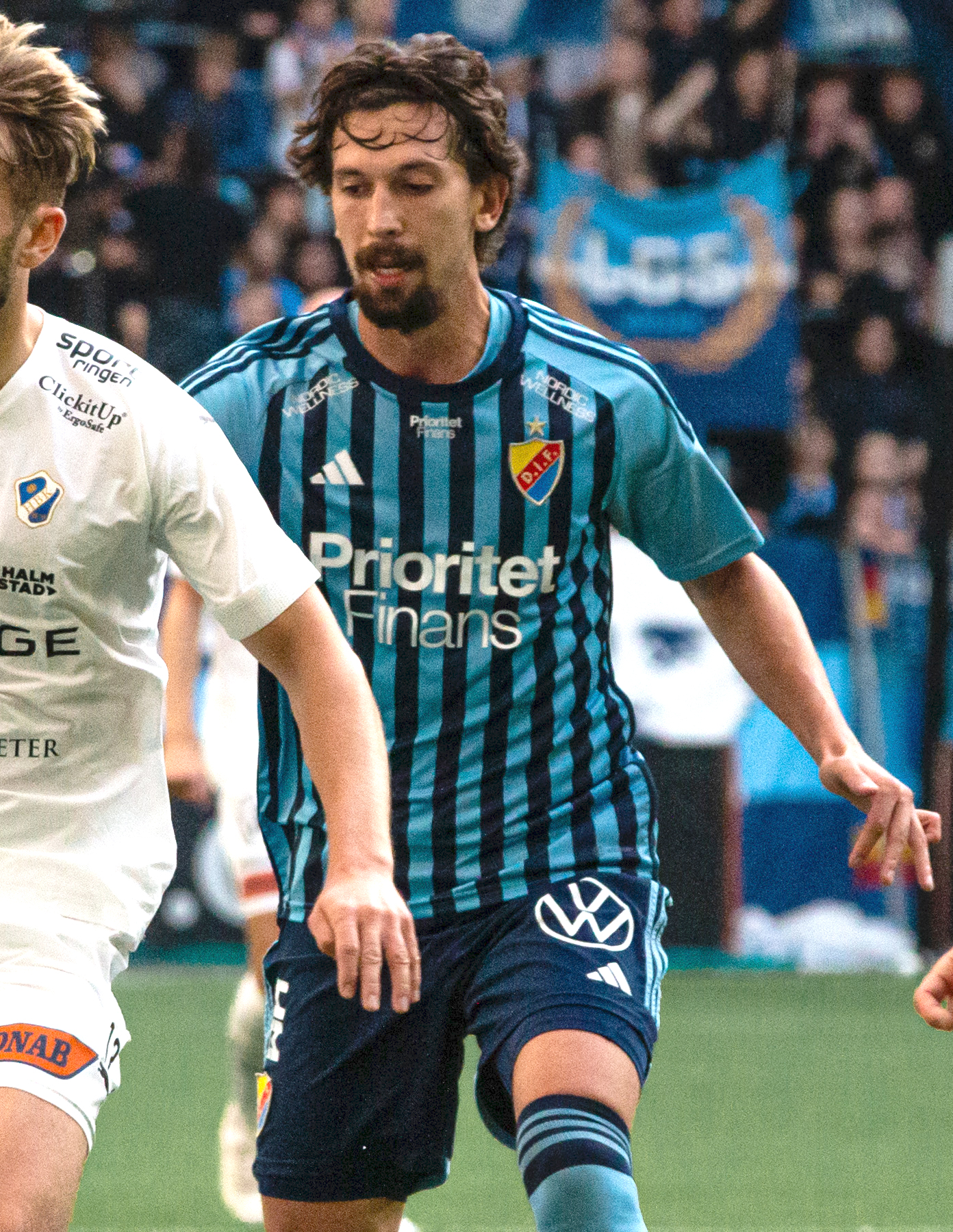

Personal information
- Full name: Gustav Mendonça Wikheim
- Date of birth: 18 March 1993 (age 33)
- Place of birth: Hokksund, Norway
- Height: 1.82 m (5 ft 11 1/2 in)
- Position: Winger

Team information
- Current team: Strømsgodset
- Number: 80

Senior career*
Years	Team	Apps	(Gls)
2011–2015	Strømsgodset	89	(16)
2016–2017	KAA Gent	2	(0)
2016–2017	→ Midtjylland (loan)	22	(4)
2017–2019	Midtjylland	71	(11)
2019–2022	Al-Fateh	43	(6)
2022–2024	Djurgårdens IF	72	(11)
2025	Nordsjælland	13	(1)
2025–	Strømsgodset	43	(3)

International career
2011	Norway U18	13	(2)
2012	Norway U19	6	(0)
2013–2014	Norway U21	12	(1)
2014–2015	Norway U23	2	(0)
- * Club domestic league appearances and goals as of 14 November 2026

Gustav Mendonça Wikheim (born 18 March 1993) is a Norwegian footballer who plays for Eliteserien side Strømsgodset as a winger.

== Career ==
=== Strømsgodset ===
Wikheim made his debut for Strømsgodset on 10 April 2011 against Odd, in a match his club won 2–0. He scored his first goal in a 2–1 loss against Molde on 23 March 2012. He gradually played more and more for Strømsgodset, and got his major breakthrough in the 2014 season, when he featured in 27 of the 30 league matches for the club.

=== KAA Gent ===
On 17 December 2015, Wikheim signed a contract lasting until June 2019 with Belgian club KAA Gent, in a €1.6 million deal.

==== Loan to FC Midtjylland ====
In the dying hours of the summer 2016 transfer deadline, Wikheim was presented in FC Midtjylland on a one-year loan with a buy-out option included from KAA Gent.

=== FC Midtjylland ===
On 21 June 2017, the club decided to sign him permanently on a four-year contract.

=== Al-Fateh ===
On 1 September 2019, Wikheim was announced at Al-Fateh on a three year contract.

=== Djurgårdens IF ===
On 26 January 2022, Wikheim was announced at Djurgårdens IF on a three year contract.

=== FC Nordsjælland ===
On February 13, 2025, it was confirmed that Wikheim was returning to Denmark as he had signed a deal until the end of 2026 with Danish Superliga club FC Nordsjælland.

== International ==
Wikheim was called up for the Norway U18 team in February 2011. He played 13 matches and scored 2 goals, before moving up on the Norway U19 team in February 2012. He played 6 matches, but did not score any goals. In February 2013, he was called up for his first Norway U21 match. He was capped 12 times, scoring one goal. In October 2014, he was called up for the Norway U23 team, and has played twice without scoring.

== Personal life ==
Wikheim is the half-brother of Lars Fuhre, another professional footballer. Their common mother is Brazilian, and the two boys grew up together in Hokksund, Norway.

== Career statistics ==
As of 3 May 2026

Club statistics
Club	Season	League			National Cup		Other		Total	
Club	Season	Division	Apps	Goals	Apps	Goals	Apps	Goals	Apps	Goals
Strømsgodset	2011	Tippeligaen	8	0	0	0	—		8	0
Strømsgodset	2012	Tippeligaen	10	2	2	0	—		12	2
Strømsgodset	2013	Tippeligaen	16	1	2	1	3 (Note: Appearances in the UEFA Europa League)	0	21	2
Strømsgodset	2014	Tippeligaen	27	4	2	0	2 (Note: Appearances in the UEFA Champions League)	0	31	4
Strømsgodset	2015	Tippeligaen	28	9	3	0	6	0	37	9
Strømsgodset	Totals		89	16	9	1	11	0	109	17
Gent	2015–16	Belgian Pro League	2	0	2	0	—		4	0
Midtjylland	2016–17	Danish Superliga	22	4	1	0	—		23	4
Midtjylland	2017–18	Danish Superliga	36	8	2	1	7	2	45	11
Midtjylland	2018–19	Danish Superliga	28	3	5	3	5 (Note: Three appearances in the UEFA Europa League and two appearances in the UEFA Champions League)	2	38	8
Midtjylland	2019–20	Danish Superliga	7	0	0	0	2	0	9	0
Midtjylland	Totals		93	15	8	4	14	4	115	23
Al-Fateh	2019–20	Saudi Professional League	24	2	2	0	—		26	2
Al-Fateh	2020–21	Saudi Professional League	7	1	0	0	—		7	1
Al-Fateh	2021–22	Saudi Professional League	12	3	1	0	—		13	3
Al-Fateh	Totals		43	6	3	0	0	0	46	6
Djurgårdens IF	2022	Allsvenskan	26	6	2	0	11 (Note: Appearances in the UEFA Europa Conference League)	3	39	9
Djurgårdens IF	2023	Allsvenskan	22	3	6	2	4	0	32	5
Djurgårdens IF	2024	Allsvenskan	24	2	1	0	12	3	37	5
Djurgårdens IF	Totals		72	11	9	2	27	6	108	19
Nordsjælland	2024–25	Danish Superliga	13	1	—		—		13	1
Strømsgodset	2025	Eliteserien	14	1	1	1	—		15	2
Strømsgodset	2026	OBOS-ligaen	5	1	0	0	—		5	1
Strømsgodset	Totals		19	2	1	1	—		20	3
Career totals			331	51	32	8	52	10	414	69

== Honours ==
=== Club ===
- Strømsgodset:
- Norwegian League: 2013

FC Midtjylland:

- Danish Superliga: 2017-18
- Danish Cup: 2018–19
