= Nana Boateng (footballer, born 1994) =

Ghanaian professional footballer

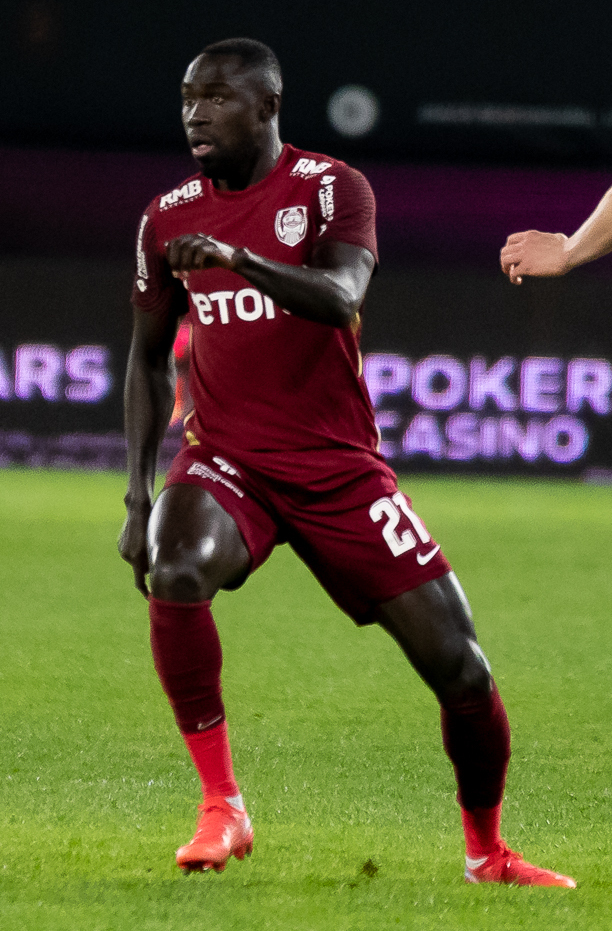
- Boateng with CFR Cluj in 2022

Personal information
- Full name: Bismark Adjei-Boateng
- Date of birth: 10 May 1994 (age 32)
- Place of birth: Accra, Ghana
- Height: 1.80 m (5 ft 11 in)
- Position: Midfielder

Youth career
- –2011: Right to Dream Academy
- 2011–2012: Manchester City

Senior career*
Years	Team	Apps	(Gls)
2012–2017	Manchester City	0	(0)
2012–2016	→ Strømsgodset (loan)	86	(16)
2017–2019	Colorado Rapids	38	(1)
2020–2021	KuPS	34	(3)
2021–2023	CFR Cluj	64	(5)
2023–2025	Jeonbuk Hyundai Motors	39	(1)
2026	Petrolul Ploiești	5	(0)
- * Club domestic league appearances and goals as of 12 April 2026

Bismark "Nana" Adjei-Boateng (born 10 May 1994) is a Ghanaian professional footballer who plays as a midfielder.

== Career ==
Boateng was signed by Manchester City F.C. in 2012, and immediately loaned alongside Enock Kwakwa to the Norwegian Tippeligaen club Strømsgodset Toppfotball, as the pair were not eligible for a UK work permit. The midfielder made his debut for Strømsgodset on 12 August 2012 in a 4–0 loss against Tromsø IL. He scored his first and second goal for the club in the match against Sogndal IL on 16 May 2013, and played an important part in the team that won the 2013 Tippeligaen league title, with 17 matches and seven goals.

After the good spell at Strømsgodset, he renewed his contract with Manchester City, and was loaned out to the Norwegian club again.

However, after receiving an ankle injury during training in September 2013, he was kept out of action until June 2014. He came back and helped his team secure fourth place in the 2014 Tippeligaen, with 11 matches and two goals. In February 2015, Manchester City agreed to a third loan spell for Boateng, this time for the whole 2015 season. He signed another full-season loan with the Norwegian club on 5 January 2016.

Boateng signed for Major League Soccer club Colorado Rapids in January 2017. He scored his first MLS goal on 11 August 2018—a dramatic stoppage-time goal that gave the Rapids a 2–1 win over the San Jose Earthquakes. On 12 July 2019, the club and Adjei-Boateng mutually agreed to terminate his contract with the club so that the player could "return to Europe to deal with a family issue".

In December 2019, Boateng signed for Veikkausliiga side Kuopion Palloseura (KuPS) on a one-year contract with an option for another year.

On 2 September 2021, Boateng signed with Romanian Liga I club CFR Cluj for an undisclosed fee, reported to be €125,000.

On 13 July 2023, Boateng joined Jeonbuk Hyundai Motors for a €2 million transfer fee.

On 30 January 2026, returned to Romania, signing a contract with Liga I club Petrolul Ploiești until June 2027.

== Career statistics ==
As of match played 12 April 2026

Appearances and goals by club, season and competition
Club	Season	League			National cup (Note: Includes Norwegian Cup, U.S. Open Cup, Finnish Cup, Cupa României, Korean FA Cup)		Continental		Other		Total	
Club	Season	Division	Apps	Goals	Apps	Goals	Apps	Goals	Apps	Goals	Apps	Goals
Strømsgodset (loan)	2012	Tippeligaen	8	0	—		—		—		8	0
Strømsgodset (loan)	2013	Tippeligaen	17	7	—		4 (Note: Appearance(s) in UEFA Europa League)	1	—		21	8
Strømsgodset (loan)	2014	Tippeligaen	11	2	1	0	—		—		12	2
Strømsgodset (loan)	2015	Tippeligaen	21	4	3	1	1	0	—		25	5
Strømsgodset (loan)	2016	Tippeligaen	29	3	4	0	2	0	—		35	3
Strømsgodset (loan)	Total		86	16	8	1	7	1	—		101	18
Colorado Rapids	2017	MLS	18	0	1	0	—		—		19	0
Colorado Rapids	2018	MLS	20	1	1	0	1 (Note: Appearance in CONCACAF Champions League)	0	—		22	1
Colorado Rapids	Total		38	1	2	0	1	0	—		41	1
KuPS	2020	Veikkausliiga	19	2	6	2	4 (Note: One appearance in UEFA Champions League, three appearances in UEFA Europa League)	0	—		29	4
KuPS	2021	Veikkausliiga	15	1	5	0	8 (Note: Appearances in UEFA Europa Conference League)	0	—		28	1
KuPS	Total		34	3	11	2	12	0	—		57	5
CFR Cluj	2021–22	Liga I	32	2	1	0	6	0	—		39	2
CFR Cluj	2022–23	Liga I	32	3	2	0	14 (Note: Two appearances and one goal in UEFA Champions League, twelve appearances and one goal in UEFA Europa Conference League)	2	1 (Note: Appearance in Liga I European play-offs)	0	49	5
CFR Cluj	Total		64	5	3	0	20	2	1	0	88	7
Jeonbuk Hyundai Motors	2023	K League 1	13	1	2	0	—		—		15	1
Jeonbuk Hyundai Motors	2024	K League 1	21	0	1	0	4 (Note: Appearances in AFC Champions League)	0	—		26	0
Jeonbuk Hyundai Motors	2025	K League 1	5	0	0	0	4 (Note: Appearances in AFC Champions League Two)	0	—		9	0
Jeonbuk Hyundai Motors	Total		39	1	3	0	8	0	—		50	1
Jeonbuk Hyundai Motors II	2024	K4 League	2	0	—		—		—		2	0
Petrolul Ploiești	2025–26	Liga I	5	0	0	0	—		—		5	0
Career total			268	26	27	3	48	3	1	0	344	32

== Honours ==
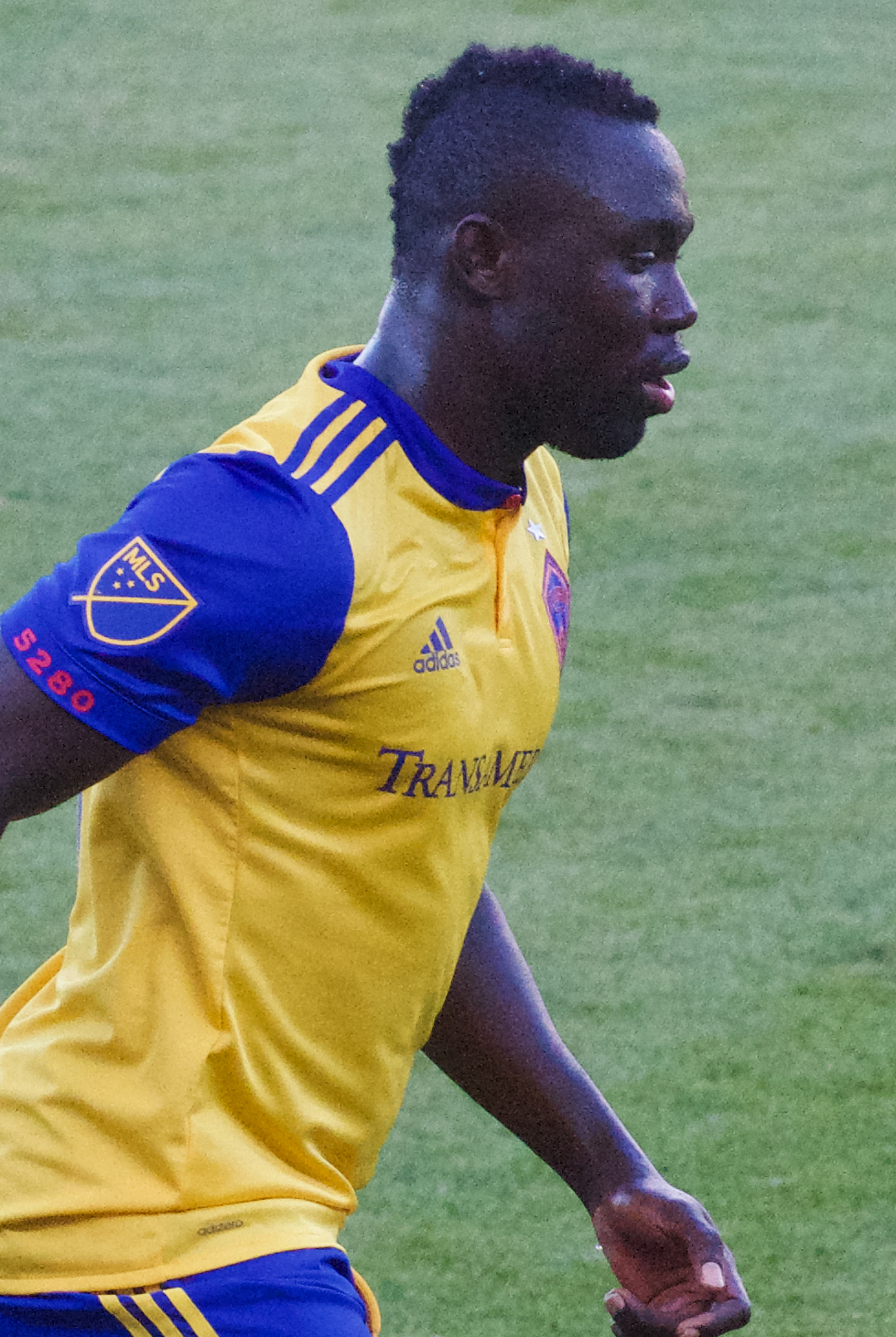
Boateng training for Colorado Rapids in 2017

Strømsgodset

- Tippeligaen: 2013

KuPS

- Veikkausliiga runner-up: 2021
- Finnish Cup: 2021

CFR Cluj

- Liga I: 2021–22
- Supercupa României runner-up: 2022

Jeonbuk Hyundai Motors

- Korean FA Cup runner-up: 2023

Individual

- Veikkausliiga Midfielder of the Year: 2020
- Veikkausliiga Team of the Year: 2020
- Liga I Team of the Season: 2021–22
