= Ola Kamara =

Norwegian footballer (born 1989)

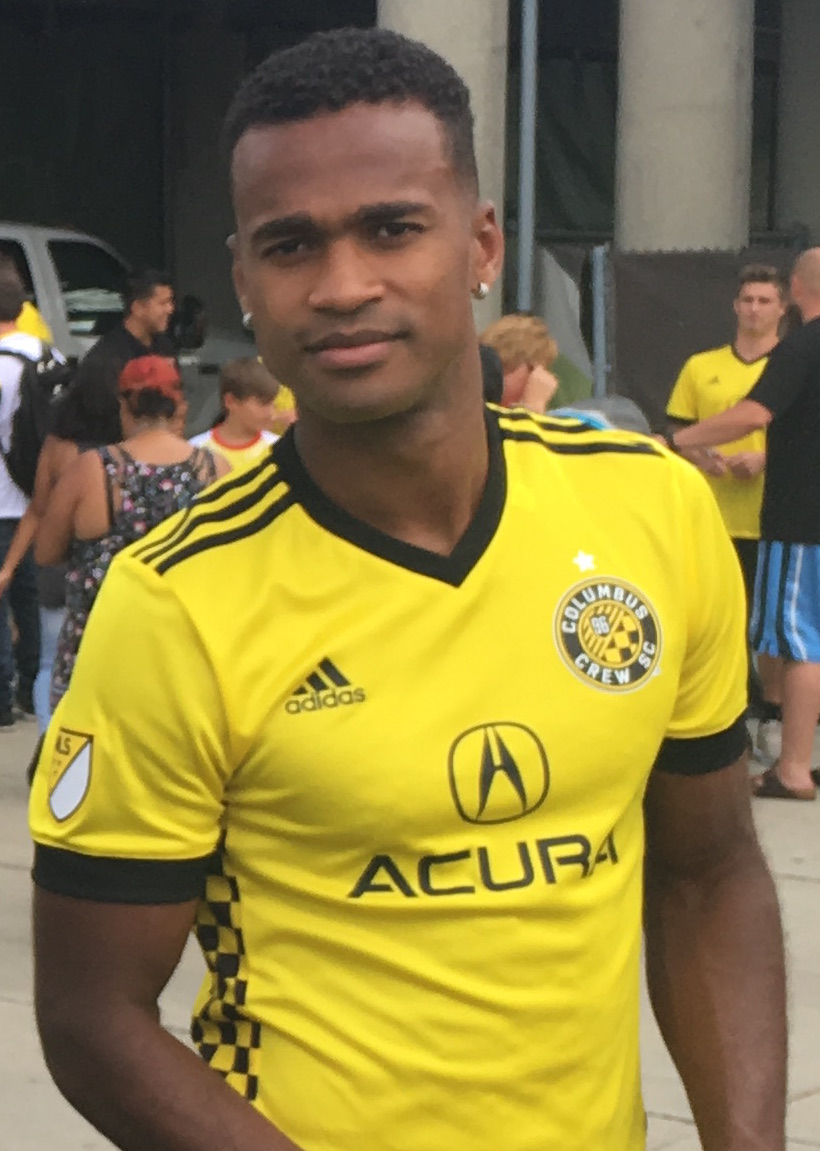
- Kamara at a fan event for Columbus Crew in 2017

Personal information
- Full name: Ola Williams Kamara
- Date of birth: 15 October 1989 (age 37)
- Place of birth: Oslo, Norway
- Height: 1.85 m (6 ft 1 in)
- Position: Striker

Team information
- Current team: Gamle Oslo FK
- Number: 19

Youth career
- –2005: Frigg
- 2005–2006: Stabæk

Senior career*
Years	Team	Apps	(Gls)
2006–2008	Stabæk	6	(0)
2007	→ Hønefoss (loan)	8	(0)
2009–2012	Strømsgodset	100	(34)
2013–2014	SV Ried	0	(0)
2013	→ 1860 Munich (loan)	10	(0)
2013	→ 1860 Munich II (loan)	5	(2)
2013	→ Strømsgodset (loan)	14	(12)
2014–2016	Austria Wien	23	(2)
2015	→ Molde (loan)	29	(14)
2016–2017	Columbus Crew	59	(34)
2018	LA Galaxy	31	(14)
2019	Shenzhen FC	5	(0)
2019–2022	D.C. United	85	(35)
2023–2024	Häcken	12	(0)
2024	Vålerenga	24	(3)
2026–	Gamle Oslo FK	2	(3)

International career^{‡}
2006	Norway U17	7	(1)
2007	Norway U18	5	(0)
2012–2013	Norway U23	3	(0)
2013–2019	Norway	17	(7)
Medal record
Stabæk
Winner	Tippeligaen	2008
Strømsgodset
Winner	Norwegian Football Cup	2010
Winner	Tippeligaen	2013
- * Club domestic league appearances and goals as of 05:16, 4 September 2026 (UTC) ‡ National team caps and goals as of 11 June 2019

Ola Williams Kamara (born 15 October 1989) is a Norwegian professional footballer who plays as a striker for Norwegian Third Division club Gamle Oslo FK. He has previously played for Stabæk, Hønefoss, Strømsgodset, Molde, Austria Wien, TSV 1860 Munich, Columbus Crew SC, LA Galaxy, Shenzhen FC, D.C. United, Häcken and Vålerenga. Kamara represented Norway both at youth and senior international levels.

== Early life ==
Ola's father moved from Sierra Leone to Norway as a refugee. Kamara was born and raised in Oslo. When Ola was one year old, his parents sought help in raising him and he spent every second weekend, holiday and birthday with a foster family. He played for Frigg during his youth and made his debut for the first team in the Second Division at the age of 15.

== Club career ==
=== Stabæk ===
Kamara moved to Stabæk at the age of 16, and soon became an integral part team of Stabæk's youth team. He scored the match-winning goal in the final against Viking when Stabæk won the Norwegian Youth Cup in 2008.

Kamara made his debut for Stabæk in Tippeligaen at the age of 16, when he replaced Somen Tchoyi as a substitute in the 2–2 draw against Lillestrøm on 1 October 2006. The next season, he joined the First Division side Hønefoss on a short-term loan, as a replacement for the injured Lars Lafton and Kenneth Di Vita Jensen. Kamara played three matches for Stabæk in 2008, enough to earn him a winners-medal, when the team won Tippeligaen. Kamara's contract expired after the 2008 season, and he wanted to find a new club, even though Stabæk wanted to renew his contract, because he found it too hard to compete with Daniel Nannskog and Veigar Páll Gunnarsson for playing time. After unsuccessful trials with Reggina and Sandefjord, Kamara had gotten an offer from the 2. divisjon side Bærum but on the last day of the transfer window ahead of the 2009 season, he signed a two-year contract with the Tippeligaen side Strømsgodset. As his wage was only 135,000 kr per year, Kamara had to move back home to his mother.

=== Strømsgodset ===
Kamara was mostly back-up for Marcus Pedersen in his first season with Strømsgodset. After Pedersen moved to Netherlands in August 2010, Kamara started to play regularly alongside Jo Inge Berget. Kamara scored seven goal in 25 matches in the 2010 season, and became joint top goalscorer for Strømsgodset alongside Pedersen. Kamara also scored goals in the semifinal and the final when Strømsgodset won the 2010 Norwegian Football Cup. Kamara signed a new two-year contract with Strømsgodset in December 2010, lasting till the end of the 2012 season.

Kamara continued to score goals in the beginning of the 2011 season, and when he scored against Odd Grenland on 10 April 2011 he had scored in six home-matches in a row. He became Strømsgodset's top goalscorer in the 2011 season, with 10 goals. Strømsgodset signed Péter Kovács and Adama Diomande ahead of the 2012 season, and Kamara was expected to play less than he had done the last two seasons, but was however playing regularly on the left wing during the season and was a great contributor to the team. After only scoring one goal in the first half of the season, Kamara scored three goals on Lerkendal Stadion in the 3–3 draw against Rosenborg on 24 June 2012. Kamara scored another hat-trick one week later, when Hønefoss was beaten 5–0. In the 5–0 victory against Fredrikstad on 27 July 2012, Kamara scored one and assisted three other goals. Kamara also scored the match-winning goal against Rosenborg on 5 November 2012, which eliminated Rosenborg title-chances. At the end of the season, Strømsgodset finished second behind Molde, and won their first league-medals since 1997.

Kamara's contract with Strømsgodset expired after the 2012 season.

=== 1860 Munich ===
On 20 January 2013, Kamara signed for SV Ried, but was immediately loaned out to TSV 1860 Munich on a six-month contract until the end of the season 2012–13 season with an option to extend the deal to two years. After the season, he went on loan to Strømsgodset.

=== Return to Strømsgodset ===
The loan spell at his old club Strømsgodset was very successful. He scored 12 goals in 14 matches, including a hat-trick in his first match, and thus played a vital role in the team that went on to win the league.

=== Austria Wien ===
After a failed trial at West Ham United Kamara signed for Austria Wien in January 2014 but scored only two goals in 23 matches.

=== Molde FK ===
On 28 January 2015, Molde FK announced that they had signed Kamara on loan for the 2015 season, with an option to buy the striker.

On 4 August 2015, he scored a goal in 3-3 draw with Dinamo Zagreb in the second match of Third Qualifying Round UEFA Champions League.

=== Columbus Crew SC ===
On 4 February 2016, Kamara signed with Columbus Crew prior to the start of the MLS season. Terms of the transfer were not disclosed. His 2016 base salary was $425,000.

Kamara made his club debut 9 April 2016 in a 2–0 loss to Montreal Impact, replacing Kei Kamara in the 70th minute. He started his time with Crew SC as the backup to Kei Kamara, but jumped into the starting role when Kei was traded to the New England Revolution. His first goal for the Crew was against Real Salt Lake on 28 May, adding two more to complete the hat trick. Kamara ended his first season outside Europe with 16 goals and two assists in 25 MLS appearances.

=== LA Galaxy ===
After two successful seasons with Columbus, in January 2018 Kamara was traded to LA Galaxy in exchange for Gyasi Zardes and $400,000 in targeted allocation money. LA sent an additional $100,000 in TAM to the Crew after Kamara passed the 12-goal mark last season. After the arrival of Zlatan Ibrahimovic to the Galaxy, Kamara wanted to pursue other options elsewhere. LA Galaxy General Manager Dennis te Kloese in a club statement. "Ola wanted to pursue opportunities elsewhere, and we worked to complete a move that will give us options to strengthen our roster moving forward. We thank Ola for what he has contributed to this club and wish him the best in his future."

Shenzhen paid the Galaxy a $3.5 million transfer fee for Kamara, who signed a three-year contract with the club that would pay him $3 million net per year.

=== Shenzhen FC ===
On 27 February 2019, Kamara transferred to Chinese Super League newcomer Shenzhen FC.

=== D.C. United ===
After an unsuccessful spell in China where he only made six appearances for Shenzhen, Kamara returned to Major League Soccer, joining D.C. United for a transfer fee of $2.5 million. D.C. United also sent $200,000 of General Allocation Money to Colorado Rapids in exchange for the No.1 slot in the 2019 Allocation Ranking, allowing them to select Kamara. He appeared the first time for DC United after being subbed on for Wayne Rooney in the 74th minute of the Vancouver Whitecaps game on 17 August 2019 In his first start for DC, Kamara scored his first DC goal in the 55th minute against the New York Red Bulls on 21 August 2019. In only his third start for DC United, he scored two goals against the Montreal Impact on 31 August 2019. The game ended as a 3–0 DC win. During the 2019 season, Kamara suffered a hamstring injury. He then returned from injury coming on in the 69th minute in a crucial game against FC Cincinnati on 6 October 2019. The crucial game ended 0–0, crushing United's hopes of hosting a round one MLS playoff game. DC had to travel to Toronto for the first round of the 2019 MLS Cup Playoffs and were defeated 5-1 after giving up 4 goals in AET to end their season.

Kamara's 2020 season was extremely disappointing, although the COVID-19 pandemic did cause a break in the MLS season and subsequent rearrangement of the schedule. He played in 22 of D.C.'s 23 regular season matches and started 17 but only managed to net four goals and did not provide a single assist. Kamara did score on the final day of season in the 33rd minute to give D.C. a 2–1 lead over Montreal Impact but two late goals by the Impact to turn the match around denied D.C. a second straight playoff appearance.

The 2021 Season did not start on a high note for Kamara. Due to a preseason injury setback he missed D.C.’s first three matches and was limited to 90 minutes total in his next four. He caught fire, however, during the summer months as he scored 13 goals in 14 matches in July, August, and September. He also lead the league in G/90 with 0.94. On the final day of the season Kamara scored a brace in a 3–1 win against Toronto FC which pushed him into a tie at the top of the 2021 MLS Golden Boot standings. Ultimately, though, he lost out to Valentin Castellanos due to the assist tiebreaker. That hurt was coupled by the fact that even though D.C. won their final match, other results did not go in their favor and they missed out on the 2021 MLS Cup Playoffs by one point.

Kamara started his 2022 season with a goal in D.C.'s 3–0 win against new-comers Charlotte FC on February 26.

=== Gamle Oslo FK ===
In April 2026, Kamara signed with Norwegian Third Division club Gamle Oslo FK.

== International career ==
Kamara was eligible to represent either Norway or Sierra Leone national teams at international levels, as his mother is Norwegian and his father Sierra Leonean. Kamara was selected for regional teams (Norwegian: Kretslag) in Oslo at the age of 15, and later represented Norway at under-16 and under-17 level. He has also represented the Norway under-23 national football team. Kamara made his debut for the Norway national team when he replaced Daniel Braaten in the 61st minute of the World Cup qualifier against Slovenia on 11 October 2013. In the match against Iceland four days later, Kamara made his starting-debut on his 24th birthday and played a total of 55 minutes.

== Career statistics ==
=== Club ===
As of 17 April 2022

Appearances and goals by club, season, and competition
Club	Season	League			National Cup		Continental		Other		Total	
Club	Season	Division	Apps	Goals	Apps	Goals	Apps	Goals	Apps	Goals	Apps	Goals
Stabæk	2006	Tippeligaen	3	0	0	0	–		–		3	0
Stabæk	2007	Tippeligaen	0	0	1	1	–		–		1	1
Stabæk	2008	Tippeligaen	3	0	1	0	0	0	–		4	0
Stabæk	Total		6	0	2	1	0	0	–		8	1
Hønefoss (loan)	2007	Adeccoligaen	8	0	1	0	–		–		9	0
Strømsgodset	2009	Tippeligaen	15	4	2	1	–		–		17	5
Strømsgodset	2010	Tippeligaen	25	7	5	2	–		–		30	9
Strømsgodset	2011	Tippeligaen	30	11	3	1	2 (Note: Appearances in UEFA Europa League)	0	–		35	12
Strømsgodset	2012	Tippeligaen	30	12	4	2	–		–		34	14
Strømsgodset	Total		100	34	14	6	2	0	–		116	40
SV Ried	2012–13	Austrian Bundesliga	0	0	0	0	–		–		0	0
SV Ried	2013–14	Austrian Bundesliga	0	0	0	0	–		–		0	0
SV Ried	Total		0	0	0	0	–		–		0	0
1860 Munich (loan)	2012–13	2. Bundesliga	10	0	0	0	–		–		10	0
1860 Munich II (loan)	2012–13	Regionalliga Bayern	5	2	–		–		–		5	2
Strømsgodset (loan)	2013	Tippeligaen	14	12	0	0	2	1	–		16	13
Austria Wien	2013–14	Austrian Bundesliga	12	1	0	0	0	0	–		12	1
Austria Wien	2014–15	Austrian Bundesliga	11	1	0	0	–		–		11	1
Austria Wien	Total		23	2	0	0	0	0	–		23	2
Molde (loan)	2015	Tippeligaen	29	14	4	2	11 (Note: Seven appearances and one goal in UEFA Champions League, four appearances and four goals in UEFA Europa League)	5	–		44	21
Columbus Crew SC	2016	MLS	25	16	1	0	–		–		26	16
Columbus Crew SC	2017	MLS	34	18	0	0	–		5 (Note: Appearance(s) in MLS Cup Playoffs)	1	39	19
Columbus Crew SC	Total		59	34	1	0	–		5	1	65	35
LA Galaxy	2018	MLS	31	14	1	0	–		–		32	14
Shenzhen FC	2019	Chinese Super League	5	0	1	0	–		–		6	0
D.C. United	2019	MLS	5	3	0	0	–		1	0	6	3
D.C. United	2020	MLS	22	4	0	0	–		0	0	22	4
D.C. United	2021	MLS	28	19	0	0	–		0	0	28	19
D.C. United	2022	MLS	30	9	1	2	–		0	0	31	11
D.C. United	Total		85	35	1	2	–		1	0	87	37
Häcken	2023	Allsvenskan	12	0	1	0	3	0	–		16	0
Vålerenga	2024	OBOS-ligaen	22	3	3	0	–		–		25	3
Career total			409	150	28	11	18	6	6	1	461	168

=== International ===
As of 2 April 2021

Appearances and goals by national team and year
National team	Year	Apps	Goals
Norway	2013	4	0
Norway	2014	3	1
Norway	2015	0	0
Norway	2016	0	0
Norway	2017	2	0
Norway	2018	4	5
Norway	2019	4	1
Total		17	7

Scores and results list Norway's goal tally first, score column indicates score after each Kamara goal.

List of international goals scored by Ola Kamara
No.	Date	Venue	Opponent	Score	Result	Competition
1	15 January 2014	Mohammed Bin Zayed Stadium, Abu Dhabi, United Arab Emirates	Moldova	1–1	2–1	Friendly
2	23 March 2018	Ullevaal Stadion, Oslo, Norway	Australia	1–1	4–1	Friendly
3	23 March 2018	Ullevaal Stadion, Oslo, Norway	Australia	3–1	4–1	Friendly
4	23 March 2018	Ullevaal Stadion, Oslo, Norway	Australia	4–1	4–1	Friendly
5	19 November 2018	GSP Stadium, Nicosia, Cyprus	Cyprus	1–0	2–0	2018–19 UEFA Nations League C
6	19 November 2018	GSP Stadium, Nicosia, Cyprus	Cyprus	2–0	2–0	2018–19 UEFA Nations League C
7	26 March 2019	Ullevaal Stadion, Oslo, Norway	Sweden	3–3	3–3	UEFA Euro 2020 qualification

== Personal life ==
In March 2018, Kamara earned a U.S. green card, which qualifies him as a domestic player for MLS roster purposes.

== Honours ==
Strømsgodset

- Tippeligaen: 2013
- Norwegian Cup: 2010

Häcken

- Svenska Cupen: 2022–23
