= Razak Nuhu =

Ghanaian international footballer (born 1991)

Personal information
- Full name: Abdul Razak Nuhu
- Date of birth: 14 May 1991 (age 35)
- Place of birth: Tamale, Ghana
- Height: 1.78 m (5 ft 10 in)
- Position: Left back

Youth career
- Right to Dream Academy

Senior career*
Years	Team	Apps	(Gls)
2011–2014	Manchester City	0	(0)
2011–2014	→ Strømsgodset (loan)	42	(1)
2014	→ Apollon Limassol (loan)	5	(0)
2014–2016	Anorthosis Famagusta	44	(1)
2017	Fredrikstad	18	(0)
2018–2019	Al-Washm	10	(0)

International career^{‡}
2012–	Ghana	2	(0)
- * Club domestic league appearances and goals as of 25 December 2018 ‡ National team caps and goals as of 24 June 2014

Abdul Razak Nuhu (born 14 May 1991) is a Ghanaian international footballer who most recently played professionally as a left back.

== Club career ==
Nuhu signed for English side Manchester City in February 2011. He was immediately loaned to Norwegian club Strømsgodset, where he made his professional debut. Nuhu moved again on a six-month loan to the Cypriot Club Apollon Limassol on 30 January 2014. On 24 June 2014, Nuhu signed a three-year contract with Anorthosis Famagusta. On 3 June 2016, Nuhu was released by Anorthosis after a two-year spell with the Cypriot side.

On 10 March 2017, Nuhu joined Norwegian side Fredrikstad.

On 10 July 2018, Al-Washm signed Nuhu from Fredrikstad.

== International career ==
Nuhu made his senior international debut for Ghana in 2012.

== Personal ==
Razak is the older brother of footballer Rashid Nuhu.

== Career statistics ==
As of 6 November 2017

Season	Club	Division	League		Cup		Europe		Total	
Season	Club	Division	Apps	Goals	Apps	Goals	Apps	Goals	Apps	Goals
2011	Strømsgodset	Tippeligaen	11	0	0	0	1	0	12	0
2012	Strømsgodset	Tippeligaen	25	1	4	0	0	0	29	1
2013	Strømsgodset	Tippeligaen	6	0	2	0	2	0	10	0
2017	Fredrikstad	OBOS-ligaen	18	0	0	0	–		18	0
Career Total			60	1	6	0	3	0	69	1
