= Lars Iver Strand =

Norwegian footballer (born 1983)

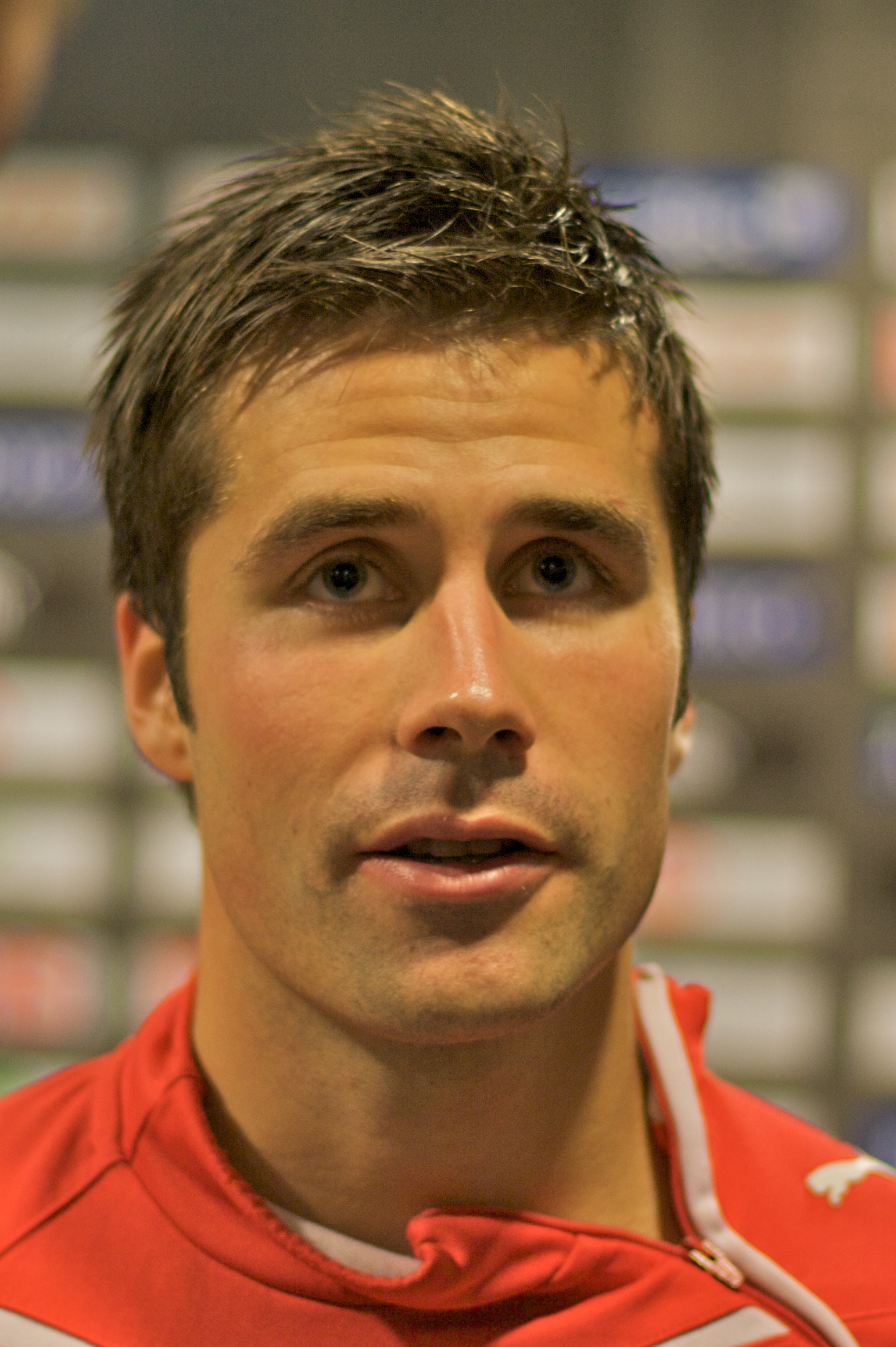

Personal information
- Full name: Lars Iver Strand
- Date of birth: 7 May 1983 (age 43)
- Place of birth: Lakselv, Norway
- Height: 1.78 m (5 ft 10 in)
- Position: Attacking midfielder

Youth career
- Porsanger FK

Senior career*
Years	Team	Apps	(Gls)
2001–2007	Tromsø	137	(25)
2008–2011	Vålerenga	21	(0)
2009	→ Tromsø (loan)	26	(4)
2012	Strømsgodset	20	(1)
2013–2014	Sandefjord	34	(3)

International career
2004–2005	Norway U21	18	(1)
2005–2007	Norway	4	(0)
- * Club domestic league appearances and goals

Lars Iver Strand (born 7 May 1983) is a Norwegian former footballer who last played for Sandefjord as an attacking midfielder.

Strand got his debut for Tromsø IL on 2 May 2001. He got his debut for the national team on 22 January 2005. Strand signed a 4-year contract with Vålerenga on 12 November 2007.

== Career statistics ==
Club	Season	Division	League		Cup		Total	
Club	Season	Division	Apps	Goals	Apps	Goals	Apps	Goals
2001	Tromsø	Tippeligaen	2	0	1	2	3	2
2002	Tromsø	Adeccoligaen	24	6	3	2	27	8
2003	Tromsø	Tippeligaen	14	1	6	5	20	6
2004	Tromsø	Tippeligaen	26	8	4	4	30	12
2005	Tromsø	Tippeligaen	24	4	3	0	27	4
2006	Tromsø	Tippeligaen	24	2	2	1	26	3
2007	Tromsø	Tippeligaen	23	4	4	0	27	4
2008	Vålerenga	Tippeligaen	19	0	4	0	23	0
2009	Tromsø	Tippeligaen	26	4	5	1	31	5
2010	Vålerenga	Tippeligaen	2	0	2	0	4	0
2011	Vålerenga	Tippeligaen	0	0	0	0	0	0
2012	Strømsgodset	Tippeligaen	20	1	0	0	20	1
2013	Sandefjord	Adeccoligaen	15	0	1	0	16	0
2014	Sandefjord	1. divisjon	19	3	0	0	19	3
Career Total			238	33	35	15	273	48
