= Lars Stubhaug =

Norwegian footballer (born 1990)

Personal information
- Date of birth: 18 April 1990 (age 36)
- Place of birth: Haugesund, Norway
- Height: 1.82 m (5 ft 11 1/2 in)
- Position: Goalkeeper

Youth career
- Vard Haugesund
- 2006–2009: Everton

Senior career*
| Years | Team | Apps | (Gls) |
| 2010–2011 | Strømsgodset | 3 | (0) |
| 2012–2013 | Hønefoss | 0 | (0) |
| 2013–2014 | Strømsgodset | 0 | (0) |
| 2014 | Rosenborg | 0 | (0) |

International career
| 2009 | Norway U-19 | 1 | (0) |
| 2010 | Norway U-21 | 1 | (0) |
- * Club domestic league appearances and goals as of 31 March 2014

Lars Stubhaug (born 18 April 1990) is a Norwegian footballer. He has previously played for Everton, Strømsgodset, Hønefoss and Rosenborg.

Before the 2013 season Stubhaug decided to retire from football to study economics in Bergen.

In April 2013, he signed a short-term contract with Strømsgodset.

== Career statistics ==
| Season | Club | Division | League | | Cup | | Total | |
| Season | Club | Division | Apps | Goals | Apps | Goals | Apps | Goals |
|---|---|---|---|---|---|---|---|---|
| 2010 | Strømsgodset | Tippeligaen | 2 | 0 | 0 | 0 | 2 | 0 |
| 2011 | Strømsgodset | Tippeligaen | 1 | 0 | 1 | 0 | 2 | 0 |
| 2012 | Hønefoss | Tippeligaen | 0 | 0 | 3 | 0 | 3 | 0 |
| 2013 | Strømsgodset | Tippeligaen | 0 | 0 | 1 | 0 | 1 | 0 |
| 2014 | Rosenborg | Tippeligaen | 0 | 0 | 1 | 0 | 1 | 0 |
| Career Total | | | 3 | 0 | 6 | 0 | 9 | 0 |
