= Jørgen Horn =

Norwegian footballer (born 1987)

Personal information
- Date of birth: 7 June 1987 (age 39)
- Place of birth: Oslo, Norway
- Height: 1.89 m (6 ft 2 1/2 in)
- Position: Defender

Team information
- Current team: Sarpsborg 08
- Number: 3

Youth career
- Vålerenga

Senior career*
Years	Team	Apps	(Gls)
2005	Kjelsås	25	(1)
2006–2007	Vålerenga	9	(0)
2006	→ Moss (loan)	6	(0)
2008–2010	Viking	21	(0)
2011–2012	Fredrikstad	45	(1)
2013–2015	Strømsgodset	46	(0)
2016–2018	Elfsborg	47	(0)
2018–2022	Sarpsborg 08	39	(1)
2023	Gamle Oslo		
2024–	Sarpsborg FK		

International career^{‡}
- Norway U21
2013	Norway	2	(0)
- * Club domestic league appearances and goals as of 13 November 2022 ‡ National team caps and goals as of 12:30, 12 January 2013 (UTC)

Jørgen Horn (born 7 June 1987) is a Norwegian footballer who plays for Norwegian club Sarpsborg FK.

== Career statistics ==
As of 20 December 2020

Season	Club	Division	League		Cup		Total	
Season	Club	Division	Apps	Goals	Apps	Goals	Apps	Goals
2006	Vålerenga	Tippeligaen	0	0	1	1	1	1
2006	Moss	Adeccoligaen	6	0	0	0	6	0
2007	Vålerenga	Tippeligaen	9	0	3	0	12	0
2008	Viking	Tippeligaen	6	0	2	0	8	0
2009	Viking	Tippeligaen	7	0	0	0	7	0
2010	Viking	Tippeligaen	8	0	1	0	9	0
2011	Fredrikstad	Tippeligaen	25	0	5	1	30	1
2012	Fredrikstad	Tippeligaen	20	1	0	0	20	1
2013	Strømsgodset	Tippeligaen	26	0	2	1	28	1
2014	Strømsgodset	Tippeligaen	6	0	0	0	6	0
2015	Strømsgodset	Tippeligaen	14	0	2	0	16	0
2016	Elfsborg	Allsvenskan	20	0	1	0	21	0
2017	Elfsborg	Allsvenskan	23	0	0	0	20	0
2018	Elfsborg	Allsvenskan	4	0	0	0	4	0
2018	Sarpsborg 08	Eliteserien	8	1	0	0	8	1
2019	Sarpsborg 08	Eliteserien	6	0	0	0	6	0
2020	Sarpsborg 08	Eliteserien	10	0	0	0	10	0
Career Total			198	2	17	3	216	5

== Honours ==
=== Club ===
Strømsgodset

- Tippeligaen (1): 2013
