= Jarl André Storbæk =

Norwegian footballer (born 1978)

Jarl-André Storbæk
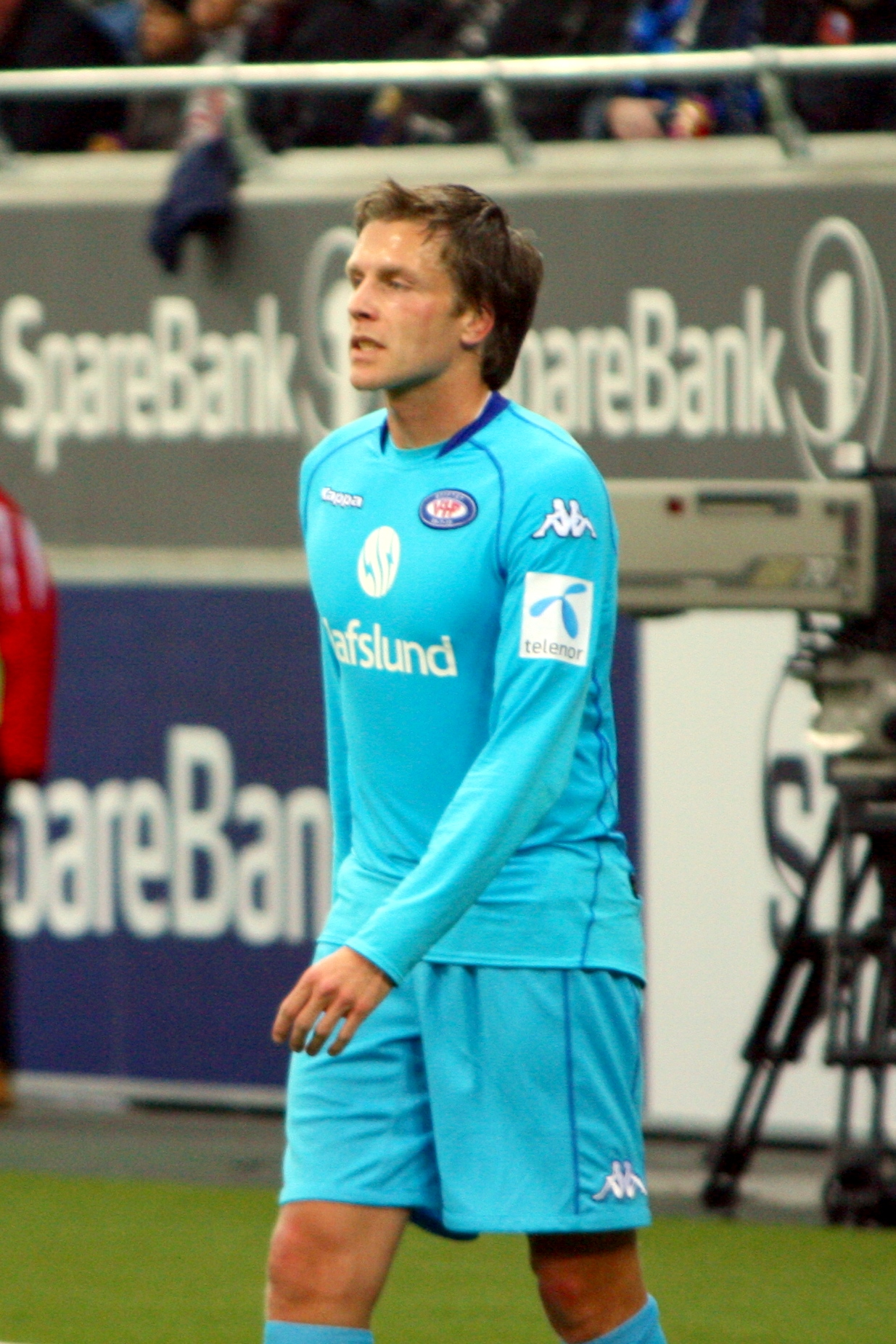

Personal information
- Date of birth: 21 September 1978 (age 48)
- Place of birth: Trysil Municipality, Norway
- Height: 1.84 m (6 ft 0 in)
- Position: Defender

Youth career
- Østre Trysil

Senior career*
Years	Team	Apps	(Gls)
1996–1999	Nybergsund	95	(7)
2000–2003	Raufoss	113	(10)
2004–2005	HamKam	51	(5)
2006–2009	Vålerenga	99	(9)
2010	Panetolikos	13	(0)
2010–2012	SønderjyskE	68	(4)
2012–2014	Strømsgodset	59	(6)
2015–2016	Nybergsund	51	(6)
Total		549	(47)

International career
2005–2008	Norway	17	(0)

Managerial career
- 2015–2016: Nybergsund (player-assistant)
- 2017–2018: Nybergsund
- 2022: Eidsvold Turn
- 2023: Brumunddal
- * Club domestic league appearances and goals

Jarl-André Storbæk (born 21 September 1978) is a Norwegian footballer who played as a defender. Between 2005 and 2008, he was capped 17 times for the Norway national team.

Storbæk has previously played for Tippeligaen clubs HamKam and Vålerenga, Panetolikos at the second tier in Greece, and SønderjyskE in the Danish Superliga. His cousin, Håvard Storbæk, is also a footballer and has played for Odd Grenland and FK Haugesund.

== Club career ==
Storbæk was born in Trysil Municipality and grew up in Ljørdalen, 50 km outside Trysil. After playing for Østre Trysil during his youth, Storbæk first club was the local Nybergsund. After playing for Raufoss in the First Division from 2000 to 2003, Storbæk joined the Tippeligaen side HamKam ahead of the 2004 season.

Half-way through the 2005 season, Vålerenga was looking for a left back and made a 3 million kr offer for Storbæk. HamKam, who were struggling against relegation, rejected the offer, and their coach, Ståle Solbakken, stated that 6 million kr would be a suitable price for Storbæk. Vålerenga instead signed Tommy Stenersen from Stabæk. The two clubs agreed on a transfer for Storbæk after the season, and he signed a four-year deal with Vålerenga on 14 November 2005. According to the newspaper Østlendingen, the transfer fee for Storbæk was around 5 million kr. Storbæk played a total of 51 matches for HamKam, scoring five goals.

The next season, Storbæk scored the equalizing goal on a penalty kick in the 1–1 draw against his old club HamKam. He played for Vålerenga from 2006 to 2009, and played a total of 99 matches and scored nine goals. Storbæk's contract with Vålerenga ended after the 2009-season, and he didn't want to sign a new deal with the club as he wanted to try playing abroad.

In February 2010, Storbæk signed a short-term contract with the Greek second tier club Panetolikos till the end of the 2009–10 season. Storbæk then joined the Danish club SønderjyskE in June 2010, as a replacement for Sölvi Ottesen who had transferred to F.C. Copenhagen. Storbæk played 68 matches in the Danish Superliga before he moved back to Norway and joined Strømsgodset in August 2012. Strømsgodset's coach Ronny Deila praised Storbæk as a "long-term signing" and believed that the 33-year-old would help Godset both in the race for the 2012 Tippeligaen-title and in the next few seasons.

Storbæk made his debut for Strømsgodset in the 1–1 draw against Sogndal on 2 September 2012. Deila made Storbæk captain in his first match, due to the absence of Alexander Aas and Adam Larsen Kwarasey.

Storbæk returned to former club Nybergsund in January 2015 in a dual role as player and assistant coach, having agreed a three-year contract.

== International career ==
From 2005 to 2008, Storbæk played 17 matches for Norway.

== Managerial career ==
After retiring at the end of 2016, Storbæk became the head coach of the club he just left, Nybergsund IL. The club announced that they did not wanted to be a player-coach as he wanted, so he retired at this point. He had already been a player-assistant at the club until he retired.

In the 2018 season, Nybergsund was relegated to the 3rd Division and Storbæk got sacked. After the sacking, Storbæk sued the club due to lack of pay and holiday pay.

In 2022 Storbæk managed Eidsvold Turn, but left due to disagreements over Eidsvold Turn's direction forward. In 2023 Storbæk managed Brumunddal, but left due to disagreements over Brumunddal's direction forward.

== Career statistics ==
Appearances and goals by club, season and competition
Club	Season	League			Cup		Total	
Club	Season	Division	Apps	Goals	Apps	Goals	Apps	Goals
Raufoss	2000	Adeccoligaen	25	2	0	0	25	2
Raufoss	2001	Adeccoligaen	30	3	0	0	30	3
Raufoss	2002	Adeccoligaen	29	1	1	0	30	1
Raufoss	2003	Adeccoligaen	29	4	5	3	34	7
Raufoss	Total		113	10	6	3	119	13
HamKam	2004	Tippeligaen	25	4	5	0	30	4
HamKam	2005	Tippeligaen	26	1	5	0	31	1
HamKam	Total		51	5	10	0	61	5
Vålerenga	2006	Tippeligaen	26	3	3	2	29	5
Vålerenga	2007	Tippeligaen	26	3	3	0	29	3
Vålerenga	2008	Tippeligaen	18	1	6	0	24	1
Vålerenga	2009	Tippeligaen	29	2	6	1	35	3
Vålerenga	Total		99	9	18	3	117	12
Panetolikos	2009–10	Beta Ethniki	13	0	0	0	13	0
SønderjyskE	2010–11	Danish Superliga	31	0	0	0	31	0
SønderjyskE	2011–12	Danish Superliga	31	3	0	0	31	3
SønderjyskE	2012–13	Danish Superliga	6	1	0	0	6	1
SønderjyskE	Total		68	4	0	0	68	4
Srømsgodset	2012	Tippeligaen	10	2	0	0	10	2
Srømsgodset	2013	Tippeligaen	26	4	0	0	26	4
Srømsgodset	2014	Tippeligaen	23	0	2	0	25	0
Srømsgodset	Total		59	6	2	0	61	6
Nybergsund	2015	2. divisjon	25	4	0	0	25	4
Nybergsund	2016	2. divisjon	26	2	1	0	27	2
Nybergsund	Total		51	6	1	0	52	6
Career total			454	40	37	6	491	46

== Honours ==
Vålerenga

- Norwegian Football Cup: 2008

Strømsgodset

- Tippeligaen: 2013
