= Péter Kovács (footballer) =

Hungarian footballer

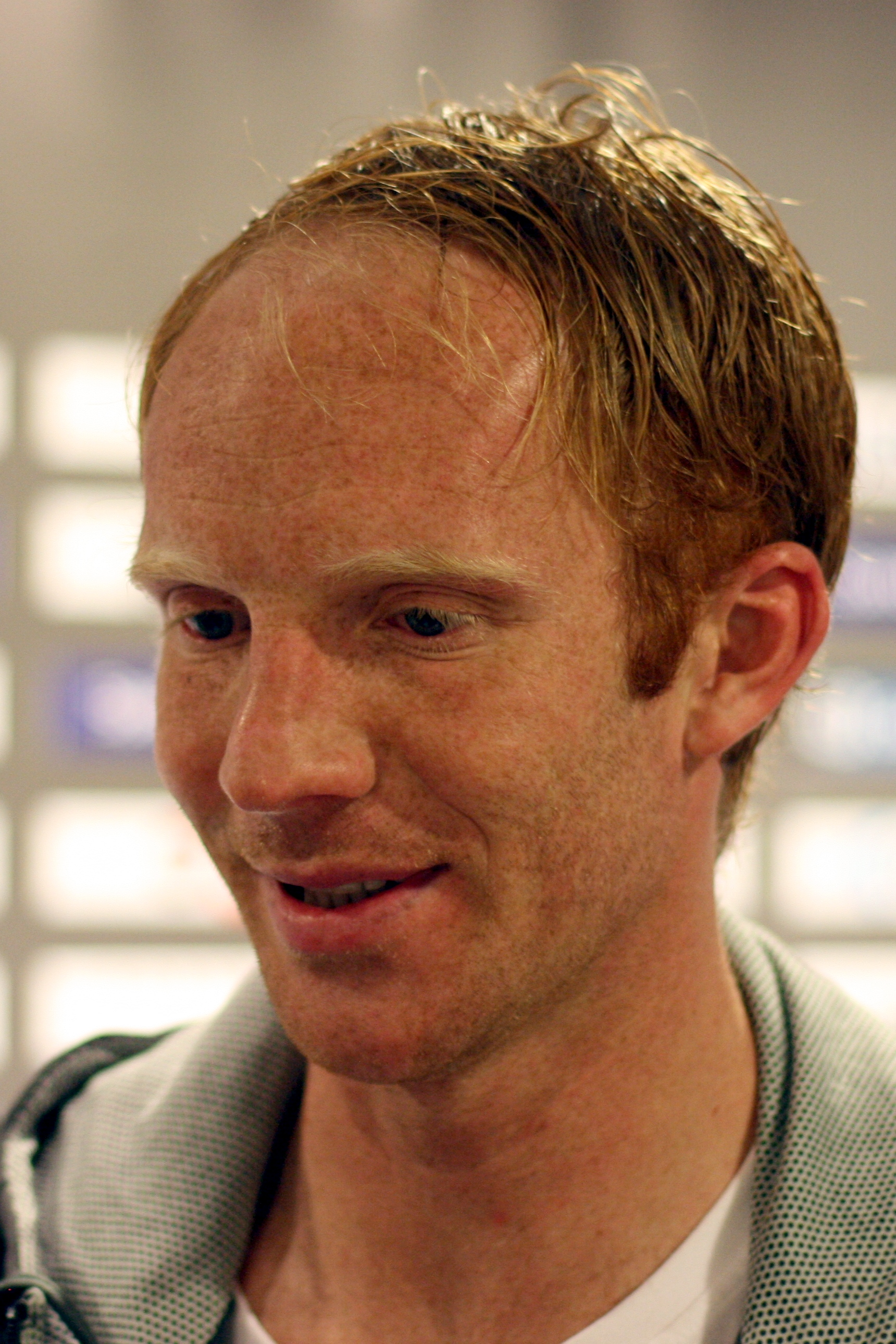
- Kovács in 2009

Personal information
- Date of birth: 7 February 1978 (age 48)
- Place of birth: Salgótarján, Hungary
- Height: 1.98 m (6 ft 6 in)
- Position: Forward

Youth career
- –1995: Salgótarjáni

Senior career*
Years	Team	Apps	(Gls)
1995–1998	Újpest	4	(0)
1997–1998	→ La Neuveville-Lamboing (loan)	?	(?)
1998	→ Érd (loan)	?	(?)
1999	Lahti	28	(10)
1999–2002	Haka	64	(21)
2002–2004	Tromsø	46	(24)
2004–2006	Viking	29	(8)
2006–2008	Strømsgodset	41	(17)
2008–2010	Odd	80	(45)
2010–2011	Lierse	36	(5)
2012–2015	Strømsgodset	87	(32)
2015	Sarpsborg 08	10	(1)
2016–2017	Sandefjord	28	(8)
2017	Arendal	9	(1)
2018–2019	Stoppen	8	(5)
2019	Re	9	(5)
Total		496	(185)

International career
2004–2005	Hungary	10	(1)
- * Club domestic league appearances and goals

Péter Kovács (born 7 February 1978) is a Hungarian former professional footballer played as a forward for Újpest and Érd in Hungary, for La Neuveville-Lamboing in Switzerland, for Lahti and Haka in Finland, for Tromsø, Viking, Strømsgodset, Odd Grenland, Sarpsborg 08, Sandefjord and Arendal in Norway, and for Lierse in Belgium.

== Club career ==
Kovács was born in Salgótarján, Hungary. When playing for FC Haka he scored a goal against Liverpool in the 2001–02 Champions League qualifyings. Kovács gained notoriety in August 2009, when in the quarter-finals of the Norwegian Cup, he scored a goal against SK Brann after Brann's keeper fell to the ground with an injured knee while trying to clear the ball upfield following a home pass. He also came one goal short of being joint top scorer in the 2009 Norwegian premier league, finishing behind Rade Prica.

He became the top scorer in the 2012 Norwegian premier league, and won the league with Strømsgodset in 2013, during his second spell at the club. On 21 July 2015, he signed a five-month deal with for Sarpsborg 08 on a free transfer. On 10 November 2015, he signed a one-year deal with newly relegated Sandefjord in the Norwegian First Division.

== Personal life ==
Kovács has a relationship with Norwegian female footballer, Melissa Wiik.

He speaks Hungarian, English and Norwegian fluently.

== Career statistics ==
=== Club ===
As of 26 November 2017

Appearances and goals by club, season and competition
Club	Season	League			Cup		Total	
Club	Season	Division	Apps	Goals	Apps	Goals	Apps	Goals
Újpest FC	1995–96		1	0			1	0
Újpest FC	1996–97		3	0			3	0
Újpest FC	Total		4	0			4	0
FC Lahti	1999	Veikkausliiga	28	10			28	10
FC Haka	2000	Veikkausliiga	26	8			26	8
FC Haka	2001	Veikkausliiga	29	7			29	7
FC Haka	2002	Veikkausliiga	9	6			9	6
FC Haka	Total		64	21			64	21
Tromsø	2002	Adeccoligaen	14	14	2	0	16	14
Tromsø	2003	Tippeligaen	24	8	4	5	28	13
Tromsø	2004	Tippeligaen	8	2	4	3	12	5
Tromsø	Total		46	24	10	8	56	32
Viking	2004	Tippeligaen	9	3	0	0	9	3
Viking	2005	Tippeligaen	9	3	1	0	10	3
Viking	2006	Tippeligaen	11	2	0	0	11	2
Viking	Total		29	8	1	0	30	8
Strømsgodset	2006	Adeccoligaen	18	12	0	0	18	12
Strømsgodset	2007	Tippeligaen	23	5	4	5	27	10
Strømsgodset	Total		41	17	4	5	45	22
Odd Grenland	2008	Adeccoligaen	29	23	3	6	32	29
Odd Grenland	2009	Tippeligaen	29	16	5	5	34	21
Odd Grenland	2010	Tippeligaen	22	6	4	6	26	12
Odd Grenland	Total		80	45	12	17	92	62
Lierse	2010–11	Belgian Pro League	22	4	0	0	22	4
Lierse	2011–12	Belgian Pro League	14	1	0	0	14	1
Lierse	Total		36	5	0	0	36	5
Strømsgodset	2012	Tippeligaen	28	14	5	8	33	22
Strømsgodset	2013	Tippeligaen	25	6	2	2	27	8
Strømsgodset	2014	Tippeligaen	24	10	3	5	27	15
Strømsgodset	2015	Tippeligaen	10	2	3	2	13	4
Strømsgodset	Total		87	32	13	17	100	49
Sarpsborg 08	2015	Tippeligaen	10	1	2	0	12	1
Sandefjord	2016	OBOS-ligaen	26	8	5	2	31	10
Sandefjord	2017	Eliteserien	2	0	1	0	3	0
Sandefjord	Total		28	8	6	2	34	10
Arendal	2017	OBOS-ligaen	9	1	0	0	9	1
Career Total			478	174	48	49	526	223

=== International goal ===
Score and result list Hungary's goal tally first, score column indicates score after Kovács goal.

International goal scored by Péter Kovács
No.	Date	Venue	Opponent	Score	Result	Competition
1	17 November 2004	Ta' Qali National Stadium, Ta' Qali, Malta	Malta	2–0	2–0	2006 FIFA World Cup qualification

== Honours ==
FC Haka

- Finnish Championship: 2000
- Finnish Cup: 2002

Strømsgodset

- Norwegian Championship: 2013

Individual

- Norwegian Cup Top goalscorer: 2012
- Norwegian Premier League top goalscorer: 2012
- Norwegian First Division top goalscorer: 2008
