= 2017 Strømsgodset Toppfotball season =

Strømsgodset
2017 season
- President: Trond Esaiassen
- Manager: Tor Ole Skullerud
- Stadium: Marienlyst Stadion
- Tippeligaen: 4th
- Norwegian Cup: Third Round vs Mjøndalen
- Top goalscorer: League: Eirik Ulland Andersen (11); All: Bassel Jradi (12)
Home colours	Away colours

The 2017 season is Strømsgodset's eleventh season back in Eliteserien since their promotion in the 2006 season.

== Squad ==
As of 24 August 2017

Note: Flags indicate national team as defined under FIFA eligibility rules; some limited exceptions apply. Players may hold more than one non-FIFA nationality.

No.	Pos.	Nation	Player
1	GK	NOR	Espen Bugge Pettersen
2	DF	NOR	Mounir Hamoud
3	DF	NOR	Jonathan Parr
4	DF	NOR	Kim André Madsen
5	DF	NOR	Jakob Glesnes
6	MF	NOR	Henning Hauger
8	MF	LBN	Bassel Jradi
9	FW	SWE	Pontus Engblom
10	FW	NOR	Marcus Pedersen
11	FW	NOR	Kristoffer Tokstad
13	MF	SWE	Christian Rubio Sivodedov
17	DF	NOR	Christoffer Lindquist

No.	Pos.	Nation	Player
19	MF	GBS	Francisco Júnior
21	MF	NOR	Mathias Gjerstrøm
23	FW	NOR	Eirik Ulland Andersen
25	DF	NOR	Stian Ringstad
26	DF	NOR	Lars Christopher Vilsvik
28	DF	NOR	Marius Høibråten
34	FW	NOR	Abdul-Basit Agouda
40	GK	NOR	Morten Sætra
54	MF	NOR	Knut Ahlander
93	MF	NOR	Tokmac Nguen
—	GK	NOR	Pål Vestly Heigre

=== Out on loan ===
Note: Flags indicate national team as defined under FIFA eligibility rules; some limited exceptions apply. Players may hold more than one non-FIFA nationality.

No.	Pos.	Nation	Player
18	DF	NOR	Henrik Bredeli (at Fredrikstad)

== Transfers ==
=== Winter ===
In: Note: Flags indicate national team as defined under FIFA eligibility rules; some limited exceptions apply. Players may hold more than one non-FIFA nationality.

No.	Pos.	Nation	Player
6	MF	NOR	Henning Hauger (from (Sweden) Elfsborg)
8	MF	LBN	Bassel Jradi (loan return from (Norway) Lillestrøm)
9	FW	SWE	Pontus Engblom (from (Norway) Sandnes Ulf)
12	GK	POL	Radosław Janukiewicz (on loan from (Poland) Pogoń Szczecin)
13	MF	SWE	Christian Rubio Sivodedov (from (Germany) Schalke 04 II)
25	DF	NOR	Stian Ringstad (from (Portugal) Braga)
33	FW	NGR	Marco Tagbajumi (from (Thailand) Nakhon Ratchasima)
77	GK	IRI	Sosha Makani (on loan from (Norway) Mjøndalen)

Out: Note: Flags indicate national team as defined under FIFA eligibility rules; some limited exceptions apply. Players may hold more than one non-FIFA nationality.

No.	Pos.	Nation	Player
8	MF	NOR	Petter Vaagan Moen (to (Norway) HamKam)
9	FW	NOR	Øyvind Storflor (to (Norway) Ranheim)
11	MF	NOR	Martin Rønning Ovenstad (to (Austria) Sturm Graz)
17	DF	NOR	Christopher Lindquist (on loan to (Norway) Florø)
18	DF	NOR	Henrik Bredeli (on loan to (Norway) Strømmen)
20	MF	GHA	Mohammed Abu (to (United States) Columbus Crew)
22	MF	GHA	Bismark Adjei-Boateng (loan return to (England) Manchester City)
30	GK	POL	Łukasz Jarosiński (to (Norway) HamKam)
40	GK	NOR	Morten Sætra (on loan to (Norway) Nybergsund)
46	DF	NOR	Sondre Solholm Johansen (on loan to (Norway) Mjøndalen)
54	MF	NOR	Knut Ahlander (on loan to (Norway) Asker)
—	GK	NOR	Anders Gundersen (to (Norway) Arendal, previously on loan at (Norway) Sandefjord)
—	GK	NOR	Borger Thomas (to (Norway) Åsane, previously on loan at (Norway) Nybergsund)

=== Summer ===
In: Note: Flags indicate national team as defined under FIFA eligibility rules; some limited exceptions apply. Players may hold more than one non-FIFA nationality.

No.	Pos.	Nation	Player
18	DF	NOR	Henrik Bredeli (loan return from (Norway) Strømmen)
—	GK	NOR	Pål Vestly Heigre (from (Norway) Aalesund)

Out: Note: Flags indicate national team as defined under FIFA eligibility rules; some limited exceptions apply. Players may hold more than one non-FIFA nationality.

No.	Pos.	Nation	Player
7	FW	NOR	Tommy Høiland (to (Norway) Viking)
12	GK	POL	Radoslaw Janukiewicz (loan return to (Poland) Pogoń Szczecin)
18	DF	NOR	Henrik Bredeli (on loan to (Norway) Fredrikstad, previously on loan at (Norway) Strømmen)
33	FW	NGR	Marco Tagbajumi (to (Norway) Lillestrøm)
46	DF	NOR	Sondre Solholm Johansen (to (Norway) Mjøndalen, previously on loan)
77	GK	IRI	Sosha Makani (loan return to (Norway) Mjøndalen)

== Competitions ==
=== Eliteserien ===
==== Results summary ====
Overall								Home						Away					
Pld	W	D	L	GF	GA	GD	Pts	W	D	L	GF	GA	GD	W	D	L	GF	GA	GD
30	14	8	8	45	37	+8	50	10	3	2	30	16	+14	4	5	6	15	21	−6

Last updated: 26 November 2017.
Source: see below

==== Results by round ====
Round	1	2	3	4	5	6	7	8	9	10	11	12	13	14	15	16	17	18	19	20	21	22	23	24	25	26	27	28	29	30
Ground	H	A	H	A	H	A	H	A	H	A	H	A	A	H	A	H	A	H	H	A	H	A	H	A	H	A	H	A	H	A
Result	W	L	D	D	W	L	D	L	L	D	W	L	D	D	L	W	D	W	W	D	L	W	W	W	W	W	W	W	W	L
Position	4	11	8	10	6	9	10	12	13	14	10	13	13	14	14	12	13	12	8	9	10	9	6	6	6	4	4	4	4	4

Updated to match(es) played on 26 November 2017. Source: see below
A = Away; H = Home; W = Win; D = Draw; L = Loss

==== Results ====
2 April 2017 1	Strømsgodset	3–1	Haugesund	Drammen
18:00 CEST (UTC+2)	Pedersen (yellow card) 20' (goal) 76'; Tagbajumi (yellow card) 23' (goal) 34', 81'	Report	Gytkjær 1'; Abdi (yellow card) 13' (yellow-red card) 59'; Andreassen (yellow card) 33'; Kiss (yellow card) 54'	Stadium: Marienlyst Stadion; Attendance: 5,575; Referee: Ola Hobber Nilsen

6 April 2017 2	Brann	3–0	Strømsgodset	Bergen
19:00 CEST (UTC+2)	Barmen 9'; Wormgoor (yellow card) 19'; Vega (yellow card) 28'; Vilsvik 72' (o.g.); Orlov 77'	Report		Stadium: Brann Stadion; Attendance: 8,706; Referee: Tom Harald Hagen

9 April 2017 3	Strømsgodset	1–1	Aalesund	Drammen
20:00 CEST (UTC+2)	Jradi (yellow card) 27'; Tagbajumi 44'; Hauger (yellow card) 61'	Report	Abdellaoue 17'	Stadium: Marienlyst Stadion; Referee: Dag Vidar Hafsås

17 April 2017 4	Sogndal	1–1	Strømsgodset	Sogndalsfjøra
18:00 CEST (UTC+2)	Ramsland 31'; Utvik (yellow card) 35'	Report	Jradi 14'; Pedersen (yellow card) 47'; Tagbajumi (yellow card) 64'	Stadium: Fosshaugane Campus; Attendance: 2,454; Referee: Kristoffer Hagenes

22 April 2017 5	Strømsgodset	1–0	Sandefjord	Drammen
18:00 CEST (UTC+2)	Nguen (yellow card) 32' (goal) 65'; Parr (yellow card) 83'	Report		Stadium: Marienlyst Stadion; Attendance: 6,375; Referee: Tore Hansen

30 April 2017 6	Kristiansund	2–0	Strømsgodset	Kristiansund
18:00 CEST (UTC+2)	Mendy 66'; Bamba 83'	Report	Jradi (yellow card) 68'	Stadium: Atlanten Stadion; Attendance: 3,658; Referee: Espen Eskås

7 May 2017 7	Strømsgodset	1–1	Sarpsborg 08	Drammen
18:00 CEST (UTC+2)	Andersen 45+1'	Report	Nielsen 30' (yellow card) 45'; Rosted (yellow card) 42'	Stadium: Marienlyst Stadion; Referee: Trygve Kjensli

13 May 2017 8	Odd	2–0	Strømsgodset	Skien
18:00 CEST (UTC+2)	Riski 58'; Jensen (yellow card) 65'	Report	Hauger (yellow card) 7'	Stadium: Skagerak Arena; Attendance: 6,994; Referee: Trond Ivar Døvle

16 May 2017 9	Strømsgodset	1–2	Stabæk	Drammen
20:00 CEST (UTC+2)	Andersen 41'; Júnior (yellow card) 74'	Report	Brochmann 35'; Omoijuanfo 79'	Stadium: Marienlyst Stadion; Attendance: 6,565; Referee: Dag Vidar Hafsås

21 May 2017 10	Tromsø	1–1	Strømsgodset	Tromsø
18:00 CEST (UTC+2)	Jenssen 31'; Norbye (yellow card) 79'	Report	Tokstad 58'; Hauger (yellow card) 83'	Stadium: Alfheim Stadion; Referee: Martin Lundby

29 May 2017 11	Strømsgodset	4–2	Viking	Drammen
19:00 CEST (UTC+2)	Andersen 10' (yellow card) 79'; Glesnes 32'; Jradi 50', 53'; Sivodedov (yellow card) 58'; Vilsvik (yellow card) 70'	Report	Danielsen (yellow card) 60'; Bytyqi 66'; Adegbenro 80'	Stadium: Marienlyst Stadion; Attendance: 5,652; Referee: Espen Andreas Eskås

4 June 2017 12	Rosenborg	3–1	Strømsgodset	Trondheim
18:00 CEST (UTC+2)	Glesnes 8' (o.g.); Jevtović 16'; Vilhjálmsson 53'	Report	Glesnes (yellow card) 18'; Parr (yellow card) 49'; Ulland Andersen 68'	Stadium: Lerkendal Stadion; Attendance: 15,974; Referee: Ola Hobber Nilsen

18 June 2017 13	Vålerenga	1–1	Strømsgodset	Oslo
20:00 CEST (UTC+2)	Jääger 18'	Report	Parr 2' (yellow card) 78'; Madsen (yellow card) 27'	Stadium: Ullevaal Stadion; Attendance: 8,049; Referee: Tore Hansen

26 June 2017 14	Strømsgodset	1–1	Molde	Drammen
19:00 CEST (UTC+2)	Andersen 48'; Jradi (yellow card) 61'; Nguen (yellow card) 69'; Pedersen (yellow card) 78'	Report	Sigurðarson 38'; Gregersen (yellow card) 56'; Hestad (yellow card) 90+3'	Stadium: Marienlyst Stadion; Attendance: 6,372; Referee: Tom Harald Hagen

1 July 2017 15	Lillestrøm	2–0	Strømsgodset	Lillestrøm
18:00 CEST (UTC+2)	Udoji 32' (yellow card) 37'; Knudtzon 42'	Report	Júnior (yellow card) 29'; Andersen (yellow card) 51'; Glesnes (yellow card) 56'; Madsen (yellow card) 82'; Vilsvik (yellow card) 86'; Sivodedov (yellow card) 90+3'	Stadium: Åråsen Stadion; Attendance: 5,634; Referee: Kai Erik Steen

9 July 2017 16	Strømsgodset	4–2	Kristiansund	Drammen
18:00 CEST (UTC+2)	Andersen 6'; D.Ulvestad 15' (o.g.); Pedersen 17'; Júnior (yellow card) 25'; Nguen 35'; Hauger (yellow card) 66'; Vilsvik (yellow card) 87'	Report	Kalludra 62' (yellow card) 87'; Bamba 64'	Stadium: Marienlyst Stadion; Attendance: 6,131; Referee: Trond Ivar Døvle

16 July 2017 17	Molde	0–0	Strømsgodset	Molde
18:00 CEST (UTC+2)		Report		Stadium: Aker Stadion; Attendance: 8,628; Referee: Tommy Skjerven

7 August 2017 18	Strømsgodset	2–0	Vålerenga	Drammen
19:00 CEST (UTC+2)	Pedersen 5'; Jradi 22'; Parr (yellow card) 90+6'	Report	Jääger (yellow card) 37'; Agyiri (yellow card) 81'	Stadium: Marienlyst Stadion; Attendance: 6,836

13 August 2017 19	Strømsgodset	3–1	Lillestrøm	Drammen
20:00 CEST (UTC+2)	Nguen 8', 21'; Pedersen 26'	Report	Amundsen (yellow card) 36'; Mikalsen (yellow card) 37'; Krogstad 44' (pen.)	Stadium: Marienlyst Stadion; Attendance: 5,713; Referee: Espen Eskås

21 August 2017 20	Sarpsborg 08	0–0	Strømsgodset	Sarpsborg
19:00 CEST (UTC+2)	Zachariassen (yellow card) 64'; Thomassen (yellow card) 82'; Askar (yellow card) 83'	Report	Pedersen (yellow card) 34'; Madsen (yellow card) 57'; Glesnes (yellow card) 72'; Tokstad (yellow card) 82'	Stadium: Sarpsborg Stadion; Attendance: 4,378; Referee: Martin Lundby

10 September 2017 21	Strømsgodset	0–2	Rosenborg	Drammen
20:00 CEST (UTC+2)	Engblom (yellow card) 23'	Report	Bendtner 61'; Adegbenro 69'	Stadium: Marienlyst Stadion; Attendance: 7,314; Referee: Tore Hansen

16 September 2017 22	Stabæk	0–2	Strømsgodset	Bærum
CEST (UTC+2)	A.El Amrani (yellow card) 81'	Report	Pedersen 21'; Hauger (yellow card) 45'; Andersen 52'	Stadium: Nadderud Stadion; Attendance: 3,677; Referee: Kristoffer Hagenes

24 September 2017 23	Strømsgodset	2–1	Tromsø	Drammen
18:00 CEST (UTC+2)	Jradi 1'; Pedersen (yellow card) 35'; Høibråten (yellow card) 42'; Nguen 60'	Report	Ingebrigtsen 51'	Stadium: Marienlyst Stadion; Attendance: 5,700; Referee: Svein Oddvar Moen

1 October 2017 24	Viking	0–1	Strømsgodset	Stavanger
18:00 CEST (UTC+2)	Jenkins (yellow card) 71'; Green (yellow card) 83'	Report	Jradi 31'; Høibråten (yellow card) 33'; Tokstad (yellow card) 50'; Nguen (yellow card) 71'	Stadium: Viking Stadion; Attendance: 6,230; Referee: Espen Eskås

14 October 2017 25	Strømsgodset	1–0	Odd	Drammen
18:00 CEST (UTC+2)	Andersen 74'	Report	Berge (yellow card) 78'; Hussain (yellow card) 90+2'	Stadium: Marienlyst Stadion; Attendance: 6,027; Referee: Trygve Kjensli

22 October 2017 26	Sandefjord	1–2	Strømsgodset	Sandefjord
18:00 CEST (UTC+2)	Kastrati 46' (yellow card) 50'; Grorud (yellow card) 69'	Report	Andersen 31'; Hauger (yellow card) 45'; Pedersen 62'; Pettersen (yellow card) 90+2'	Stadium: Komplett Arena; Attendance: 3,222; Referee: Kristoffer Hagenes

29 October 2017 28	Strømsgodset	4–1	Sogndal	Drammen
18:00 CET (UTC+1)	Glesnes (yellow card) 39'; Júnior 44'; Jradi 61', 86'; Pedersen 64'	Report	Bye 14' (yellow card) 90'; Wæhler (yellow card) 39'	Stadium: Marienlyst Stadion; Attendance: 6,048; Referee: Ola Hobber Nilsen

5 November 2017 28	Haugesund	1–3	Strømsgodset	Haugesund
18:00 CET (UTC+1)	Serafin 5'; Ibrahim (yellow card) 56'	Report	Jradi 7'; Glesnes 57' (yellow card) 68'; Andersen 63'	Stadium: Haugesund Stadion; Attendance: 3,709; Referee: Sigurd Kringstad

19 November 2017 29	Strømsgodset	2–1	Brann	Drammen
18:00 CET (UTC+1)	Pedersen 4' (yellow card) 84'; Andersen 78'	Report	Wormgoor (yellow card) 41'; Vega (yellow card) 45' (goal) 81'	Stadium: Marienlyst Stadion; Attendance: 7,706; Referee: Dag Vidar Hafsås

26 November 2017 30	Aalesund	4–3	Strømsgodset	Ålesund
18:00 CET (UTC+1)	Abdellaoue 12', 89', 90+2'; Þrándarson (yellow card) 38'; Papazoglou (yellow card) 45+2'; Gyasi 54' (yellow card) 74'; Grétarsson (yellow card) 78'; Carlsen (yellow card) 82'	Report	Jradi 39' (yellow card) 74'; Nguen 81'; Pedersen 89'	Stadium: Color Line Stadion; Attendance: 6,421; Referee: Kai Erik Steen

==== Table ====
Pos	Team	Pld	W	D	L	GF	GA	GD	Pts	Qualification or relegation
2	Molde	30	16	6	8	50	35	+15	54	Qualification for the Europa League first qualifying round
3	Sarpsborg 08	30	13	12	5	50	36	+14	51	Qualification for the Europa League first qualifying round
4	Strømsgodset	30	14	8	8	45	37	+8	50	
5	Brann	30	13	8	9	51	36	+15	47	
6	Odd	30	12	6	12	27	39	−12	42	

Source: Football Association of Norway (in Norwegian), Soccerway
Rules for classification: 1) Points; 2) Goal difference; 3) Goals scored; 4) Head-to-head points; 5) Head-to-head goal difference; 6) Head-to-head away goals scored (only if between two teams); 7) Head-to-head goals scored; 8) Play-off (only used to decide champions or relegation).

=== Norwegian Cup ===
26 April 2017 First Round	Åssiden	1–3	Strømsgodset	Drammen
18:00 CEST (UTC+2)	Andersen (yellow card) 32' (goal) 85'	Report	Engblom 3', 48' (pen.); Agouda 89'	Stadium: Åssiden stadion Attendance: 1,630; Referee: Mohammad Usman Aslam

24 May 2017 Second Round	Skeid	2–4 (a.e.t.)	Strømsgodset	Oslo
18:00 CEST (UTC+2)	Yousef 10'; Tavakoli 45+1'; H.Andresen (yellow card) 66'; T.Skogsrud (yellow card) 72'	Report	Hamoud 32'; Tagbajumi (yellow card) 76'; Jradi 87', 95'; Engblom 91'; Janukiewicz (yellow card) 119'	Stadium: Nordre Åsen; Attendance: 766; Referee: Per Erik Haugen

1 June 2017 Third Round	Mjøndalen	2–1	Strømsgodset	Mjøndalen
19:00 CEST (UTC+2)	Bojang (yellow card) 42'; Boye 59'; Pellegrino 66' (yellow card) 68'	Report	Pedersen 44' (yellow card) 45'; Sivodedov (yellow card) 66'; Júnior (yellow card) 90+2'	Stadium: Isachsen Stadion; Referee: Tom Harald Hagen

== Squad statistics ==
As of match played 26 November 2017

=== Appearances and goals ===
No.	Pos	Nat	Player	Total		Eliteserien		Norwegian Cup	
No.	Pos	Nat	Player	Apps	Goals	Apps	Goals	Apps	Goals
1	GK	(Norway) NOR	Espen Bugge Pettersen	25	0	24	0	1	0
2	DF	(Norway) NOR	Mounir Hamoud	13	1	5+6	0	2	1
3	DF	(Norway) NOR	Jonathan Parr	30	1	27+1	1	2	0
4	DF	(Norway) NOR	Kim André Madsen	14	0	11	0	3	0
5	DF	(Norway) NOR	Jakob Glesnes	31	2	28	2	3	0
6	MF	(Norway) NOR	Henning Hauger	27	0	26	0	0+1	0
8	MF	(Lebanon) LBN	Bassel Jradi	31	12	28+1	10	2	2
9	FW	(Sweden) SWE	Pontus Engblom	20	3	1+17	0	1+1	3
10	FW	(Norway) NOR	Marcus Pedersen	28	10	25+1	9	2	1
11	FW	(Norway) NOR	Kristoffer Tokstad	28	1	17+10	1	1	0
13	MF	(Sweden) SWE	Christian Rubio Sivodedov	12	0	1+8	0	3	0
19	MF	(Guinea-Bissau) GBS	Francisco Júnior	31	1	26+3	1	2	0
21	MF	(Norway) NOR	Mathias Gjerstrøm	7	0	0+6	0	1	0
23	MF	(Norway) NOR	Eirik Ulland Andersen	29	11	24+2	11	3	0
25	DF	(Norway) NOR	Stian Ringstad	9	0	4+4	0	1	0
26	DF	(Norway) NOR	Lars-Christopher Vilsvik	30	0	27+1	0	1+1	0
28	DF	(Norway) NOR	Marius Høibråten	23	0	19+3	0	0+1	0
34	FW	(Norway) NOR	Abdul-Basit Agouda	2	1	0+1	0	0+1	1
39	DF	(Kosovo) KOS	Loti Celina	1	0	0	0	0+1	0
63	FW	(Norway) NOR	Magnus Lankhof-Dahlby	1	0	0	0	0+1	0
66	FW	(Norway) NOR	Andreas Hoven	5	0	0+4	0	1	0
93	MF	(Norway) NOR	Tokmac Nguen	30	6	21+7	6	1+1	0
Players away from Strømsgodset on loan:
Players who left Strømsgodset during the season:
7	FW	(Norway) NOR	Tommy Høiland	6	0	0+5	0	1	0
12	GK	(Poland) POL	Radosław Janukiewicz	7	0	5	0	2	0
33	FW	(Nigeria) NGR	Marco Tagbajumi	14	3	10+3	3	0+1	0
77	GK	(Iran) IRI	Sosha Makani	1	0	1	0	0	0

=== Goal scorers ===
Place	Position	Nation	Number	Name	Tippeligaen	Norwegian Cup	Total
1	MF	(Lebanon)	8	Bassel Jradi	10	2	12
2	MF	(Norway)	23	Eirik Ulland Andersen	11	0	11
3	FW	(Norway)	10	Marcus Pedersen	9	1	10
4	MF	(Norway)	93	Tokmac Nguen	6	0	6
5	FW	(Nigeria)	33	Marco Tagbajumi	3	0	3
5	FW	(Sweden)	9	Pontus Engblom	0	3	3
7	DF	(Norway)	5	Jakob Glesnes	2	0	2
8	FW	(Norway)	11	Kristoffer Tokstad	1	0	1
8	DF	(Norway)	3	Jonathan Parr	1	0	1
8	MF	(Guinea-Bissau)	19	Francisco Júnior	1	0	1
8	FW	(Norway)	36	Abdul-Basit Agouda	0	1	1
8	DF	(Norway)	2	Mounir Hamoud	0	1	1
8				Own goal	1	0	1
				TOTALS	45	8	53

=== Disciplinary record ===
Number	Nation	Position	Name	Tippeligaen		Norwegian Cup		Total	
Number	Nation	Position	Name	Yellow card	Red card	Yellow card	Red card	Yellow card	Red card
1	(Norway)	GK	Espen Bugge Pettersen	1	0	0	0	1	0
3	(Norway)	DF	Jonathan Parr	4	0	0	0	4	0
4	(Norway)	DF	Kim André Madsen	3	0	0	0	3	0
5	(Norway)	DF	Jakob Glesnes	5	0	0	0	5	0
6	(Norway)	MF	Henning Hauger	6	0	0	0	6	0
8	(Lebanon)	MF	Bassel Jradi	4	0	0	0	4	0
9	(Sweden)	FW	Pontus Engblom	1	0	0	0	1	0
10	(Norway)	FW	Marcus Pedersen	6	0	1	0	7	0
11	(Norway)	FW	Kristoffer Tokstad	2	0	0	0	2	0
13	(Sweden)	MF	Christian Rubio Sivodedov	2	0	1	0	3	0
19	(Guinea-Bissau)	MF	Francisco Júnior	3	0	1	0	4	0
23	(Norway)	MF	Eirik Ulland Andersen	2	0	0	0	2	0
26	(Norway)	DF	Lars-Christopher Vilsvik	3	0	0	0	3	0
28	(Norway)	DF	Marius Høibråten	2	0	0	0	2	0
33	(Nigeria)	FW	Marco Tagbajumi	2	0	1	0	3	0
93	(Norway)	MF	Tokmac Nguen	3	0	0	0	3	0
			TOTALS	49	0	4	0	53	0
