= 2016 Strømsgodset Toppfotball season =

Strømsgodset
2016 season
- President: Trond Esaiassen
- Manager: Bjørn Petter Ingebretsen
- Stadium: Marienlyst Stadion
- Tippeligaen: 7th
- Norwegian Cup: Semifinal vs Kongsvinger
- Europa League: Second qualifying round vs SønderjyskE
- Top goalscorer: League: Marcus Pedersen (8); All: Marcus Pedersen (12)
Home colours	Away colours

The 2016 season is Strømsgodset's tenth season back in the Tippeligaen since their relegation at the end of the 2001 season.

== Squad ==
As of 20 February 2016

Note: Flags indicate national team as defined under FIFA eligibility rules; some limited exceptions apply. Players may hold more than one non-FIFA nationality.

No.	Pos.	Nation	Player
1	GK	NOR	Espen Bugge Pettersen
2	DF	NOR	Mounir Hamoud
3	DF	NOR	Jonathan Parr
4	DF	NOR	Kim André Madsen
5	DF	NOR	Jakob Glesnes
7	FW	NOR	Tommy Høiland
8	MF	NOR	Petter Vaagan Moen
9	MF	NOR	Øyvind Storflor
10	FW	NOR	Marcus Pedersen
11	MF	NOR	Martin Rønning Ovenstad
12	GK	NOR	Borger Thomas
15	MF	NOR	Kristoffer Tokstad
18	DF	NOR	Henrik Bredeli

No.	Pos.	Nation	Player
19	MF	POR	Francisco Júnior
20	MF	GHA	Mohammed Abu
21	MF	NOR	Mathias Gjerstrøm
22	MF	GHA	Nana (on loan from Manchester City)
23	MF	NOR	Eirik Ulland Andersen
26	DF	NOR	Lars Christopher Vilsvik
28	DF	NOR	Marius Høibråten
30	GK	POL	Łukasz Jarosiński
51	DF	NOR	Jørgen Oland
58	DF	NOR	Christoffer Lindquist
71	DF	NOR	Gustav Valsvik
77	MF	NOR	Muhamed Keita (on loan from Lech Poznań)
93	MF	NOR	Tokmac Nguen

=== Out on loan ===
Note: Flags indicate national team as defined under FIFA eligibility rules; some limited exceptions apply. Players may hold more than one non-FIFA nationality.

No. / Pos. / Nation / Player; 13 / GK / NOR / Anders Gundersen (on loan to Sandefjord)	No. / Pos. / Nation / Player; - / MF / LBN / Bassel Jradi (on loan to Lillestrøm)

== Transfers ==
=== Winter ===
In: Note: Flags indicate national team as defined under FIFA eligibility rules; some limited exceptions apply. Players may hold more than one non-FIFA nationality.

No.	Pos.	Nation	Player
3	DF	NOR	Jonathan Parr (from (England) Ipswich Town)
7	FW	NOR	Tommy Høiland (from (Norway) Molde)
19	MF	POR	Francisco Júnior (from (England) Everton)
22	MF	GHA	Nana (on loan from (England) Manchester City)
77	MF	NOR	Muhamed Keita (on loan from (Poland) Lech Poznań)

Out: Note: Flags indicate national team as defined under FIFA eligibility rules; some limited exceptions apply. Players may hold more than one non-FIFA nationality.

No.	Pos.	Nation	Player
5	DF	NOR	Jørgen Horn (to (Sweden) Elfsborg)
6	DF	FRA	Florent Hanin (to (Switzerland) St. Gallen)
7	MF	LBN	Bassel Jradi (on loan to (Norway) Lillestrøm)
12	GK	NOR	Borger Thomas (on loan to (Norway) Nybergsund)
13	GK	NOR	Anders Gundersen (on loan to (Norway) Sandefjord)
14	MF	NOR	Iver Fossum (to (Germany) Hannover 96)
17	FW	NOR	Thomas Lehne Olsen (to (Norway) Tromsø)
19	FW	NOR	Gustav Wikheim (to (Belgium) Gent)
22	MF	GHA	Nana (loan return to (England) Manchester City)
33	FW	NGR	Marco Tagbajumi (loan return to (Cyprus) Limassol)
75	FW	BEL	Marvin Ogunjimi (to (South Korea) Suwon FC)

=== Summer ===
In: Note: Flags indicate national team as defined under FIFA eligibility rules; some limited exceptions apply. Players may hold more than one non-FIFA nationality.

No.	Pos.	Nation	Player
5	DF	NOR	Jakob Glesnes (from (Norway) Sarpsborg 08)
15	MF	NOR	Kristoffer Tokstad (from (Norway) Sarpsborg 08)
21	MF	NOR	Mathias Gjerstrøm (loan return from (Norway) Kongsvinger)
23	MF	NOR	Eirik Ulland Andersen (from (Norway) Hødd)

Out: Note: Flags indicate national team as defined under FIFA eligibility rules; some limited exceptions apply. Players may hold more than one non-FIFA nationality.

No.	Pos.	Nation	Player
15	FW	KOS	Flamur Kastrati (to (Norway) Aalesund)
23	FW	NOR	Thomas Sørum (to (Norway) Mjøndalen)
71	DF	NOR	Gustav Valsvik (to (Germany) Eintracht Braunschweig)
77	FW	NOR	Muhamed Keita (loan return to (Poland) Lech Poznan, later loaned to (Norway) Stabæk)

== Friendlies ==
24 January 2016	Strømsgodset (Norway)	2–1	(Poland) Piast Gliwice	La Manga, Spain
16:00 CET (UTC+1)	Pedersen 68'; Kastrati 85'	Summary	Vacek 15'

26 January 2016	Dinamo Zagreb (Croatia)	0–2	(Norway) Strømsgodset	La Manga, Spain
17:00 CET (UTC+1)		Summary	Kastrati 40'; Pedersen 54'

29 January 2016	Litex Lovech (Bulgaria)	1–0	(Norway) Strømsgodset	La Manga, Spain
19:00 CET (UTC+1)	Høibråten 84' (o.g.)	Summary

5 February 2016	Strømsgodset	1–2	Odd	La Manga, Spain
12:30 CET (UTC+1)	Pedersen 45' (yellow card) 45'	Summary	Zekhnini 13'; Nordkvelle 27'

17 February 2016	Strømsgodset (Norway)	1–2	(Ukraine) Dynamo Kyiv	La Manga, Spain
17:05 CET (UTC+1)	Kastrati 72'	Summary	Yarmolenko 60'; Husyev 77'

21 February 2016	Strømsgodset (Norway)	1–1	(Russia) Dynamo Moscow	La Manga, Spain
16:30 CET (UTC+1)	Gjerstrøm 90'	Summary	Kuzmin 9'

25 February 2016	Strømsgodset (Norway)	2–0	(Belarus) Shakhtyor Soligorsk	La Manga, Spain
16:00 CET (UTC+1)	Storflor 60'; Sørum 90'	Summary

5 March 2016	Strømsgodset	3–3	Vålerenga	Drammen
16:00 CET (UTC+1)	Ovenstad 2'; Sørum 14'; Nguen 87'	Summary	Zahid 21'; Brown 41'; Ómarsson 53'; Moa (penalty missed)	Stadium: Marienlyst Stadion

== Competitions ==
=== Tippeligaen ===
==== Results summary ====
Overall								Home						Away					
Pld	W	D	L	GF	GA	GD	Pts	W	D	L	GF	GA	GD	W	D	L	GF	GA	GD
30	12	8	10	44	40	+4	44	9	5	1	30	15	+15	3	3	9	14	25	−11

Last updated: 10 November 2016.
Source: see below

==== Results by round ====
Round	1	2	3	4	5	6	7	8	9	10	11	12	13	14	15	16	17	18	19	20	21	22	23	24	25	26	27	28	29	30
Ground	H	A	H	A	H	A	H	A	H	A	H	H	A	H	A	H	A	H	A	H	A	H	A	A	H	A	H	A	H	A
Result	D	L	W	L	W	W	W	D	W	L	W	W	L	W	W	W	L	D	L	D	L	L	D	L	D	L	D	W	W	D
Position	7	13	8	11	8	6	6	6	4	5	4	4	4	3	3	3	3	4	4	4	6	7	7	8	8	8	8	7	7	7

Updated to match(es) played on 10 November 2016. Source: see below
A = Away; H = Home; W = Win; D = Draw; L = Loss

==== Results ====
13 March 2016 1	Strømsgodset	2–2	Brann	Drammen
18:00 CET (UTC+1)	Storflor 4'; Høiland 34' (yellow card) 77'; Kastrati (red card) 73'	Summary	Huseklepp 45'; Orlov 75'	Stadium: Marienlyst Stadion; Attendance: 7,394; Referee: Svein Oddvar Moen

19 March 2016 2	Rosenborg	1–0	Strømsgodset	Trondheim
18:00 CET (UTC+1)	Gytkjær 15'; Svensson (yellow card) 89'	Summary	Parr (yellow card) 65'	Stadium: Lerkendal Stadion; Attendance: 16,633; Referee: Tommy Skjerven

3 April 2016 3	Strømsgodset	2–0	Haugesund	Drammen
20:00 CEST (UTC+1)	Nana 33'; Høiland (yellow card) 53', (penalty missed); Ovenstad (yellow card) 60', (goal) 68'; Pedersen (yellow card) 90'	Summary	Kiss (yellow card) 20' (yellow-red card) 28'; Tubić (yellow card) 42'; Troost-Ekong (yellow card) 64'; Hajradinović (red card) 81'	Stadium: Marienlyst Stadion; Attendance: 6,095; Referee: Kim Andre Johnsen

10 April 2016 4	Tromsø	2–0	Strømsgodset	Tromsø
18:00 CEST (UTC+2)	Espejord 45+1'; Ødegaard (yellow card) 47'; Norbye (yellow card) 77'; Åsen (yellow card) 80'; Moussa 90'	Summary	Nana (yellow card) 74'	Stadium: Alfheim Stadion; Attendance: 3,423; Referee: Martin Lundby

16 April 2016 5	Strømsgodset	2–1	Sogndal	Drammen
15:30 CEST (UTC+2)	Hamoud (yellow card) 23'; Høiland (penalty missed); Pedersen 63', 70'	Summary	Sarr (yellow card) 36' (yellow-red card) 60'; Utvik 47'; Psyché (yellow card) 67'	Stadium: Marienlyst Stadion; Attendance: 6,497; Referee: Espen Eskås

20 April 2016 6	Stabæk	0–1	Strømsgodset	Bærum
19:00 CEST (UTC+2)	Mandé (yellow card) 39'	Summary	Madsen (yellow card) 29'; Vilsvik 39' (pen.)	Stadium: Nadderud Stadion; Attendance: 3,807; Referee: Tom Harald Hagen

23 April 2016 7	Strømsgodset	2–0	Bodø/Glimt	Drammen
15:30 CEST (UTC+2)	Pedersen 2' (pen.); Júnior (yellow card) 29'; Abu (yellow card) 73'; Storflor (yellow card) 73'; Kastrati 76'	Summary	Jacobsen (yellow card) 1'; Normann (yellow card) 66'	Stadium: Marienlyst Stadion; Attendance: 6,816; Referee: Svein-Erik Edvartsen

1 May 2016 8	Start	2–2	Strømsgodset	Kristiansand
18:00 CEST (UTC+2)	Sandnes 52'; Salvesen 88'	Summary	Abu (yellow card) 9'; Storflor 41'; Nguen 63'; Valsvik (yellow card) 72'	Stadium: Sør Arena; Attendance: 4,248; Referee: Trygve Kjensli

7 May 2016 9	Strømsgodset	3–1	Lillestrøm	Drammen
18:00 CEST (UTC+2)	Nguen 24'; Høibråten (yellow card) 39'; Júnior (yellow card) 52'; Pedersen 54'; Høiland 86'	Summary	Kippe (yellow card) 13'; Friday 48'	Stadium: Marienlyst Stadion; Attendance: 6,637; Referee: Tom Harald Hagen

11 May 2016 10	Molde	4–2	Strømsgodset	Molde
19:00 CEST (UTC+2)	Gulbrandsen 7'; Elyounoussi 22', 25'; Hestad (yellow card) 44'; Amang 63'	Summary	Moen (yellow card) 49' (goal) 62'; Nguen (yellow card) 50'; Kastrati 81'	Stadium: Aker Stadion; Attendance: 7,947; Referee: Trygve Kjensli

16 May 2016 11	Strømsgodset	4–0	Sarpsborg 08	Drammen
20:00 CEST (UTC+2)	Parr 10'; Nana (yellow card) 62'; Valsvik 65'; Storflor 68'; Pedersen 73'	Summary	Thomassen (yellow card) 52'; Hansen (red card) 66'	Stadium: Marienlyst Stadion; Attendance: 7,132; Referee: Martin Lundby

22 May 2016 12	Strømsgodset	3–2	Vålerenga	Drammen
18:00 CEST (UTC+2)	Keita 58'; Moen (yellow card) 60' (goal) 85'; Vilsvik 71'	Summary	Brown 20'; Arvidsson (yellow card) 27'; Abu 28' (o.g.); Lindkvist (yellow card) 65'; Falch (yellow card) 65'	Stadium: Marienlyst Stadion; Attendance: 7,258; Referee: Svein Oddvar Moen

29 May 2016 13	Odd	2–1	Strømsgodset	Skien
15:30 CEST (UTC+2)	Nordkvelle 3' (pen.); Jensen (yellow card) 21'; Bentley 73'; Zekhnini (yellow card) 88'	Summary	Nguen 35'; Abu (yellow card) 66'; Júnior (red card) 83'; Pedersen (yellow card) 87'; Høiland (yellow card) 87'	Stadium: Skagerak Arena; Attendance: 8,656; Referee: Dag Vidar Hafsås

4 July 2016 14	Strømsgodset	4–2	Aalesund	Drammen
19:00 CEST (UTC+2)	Keita 17'; Kirkeskov 26' (o.g.); Vilsvik 74'; Kastrati 90+7' (yellow card) 90+8'	Summary	Abdellaoue 5'; Larsen 34'; Riise (yellow card) 80'	Stadium: Marienlyst Stadion; Attendance: 6,467; Referee: Kai Erik Steen

9 July 2016 15	Viking	0–1	Strømsgodset	Stavanger
15:30 CEST (UTC+2)	Adegbenro (yellow card) 45+2'; Jørgensen (yellow card) 82'	Summary	Hamoud (yellow card) 56'; Keita 78'; Pedersen (yellow card) 83'	Stadium: Viking Stadion; Attendance: 7,419; Referee: Trond Ivar Døvle

17 July 2016 16	Strømsgodset	1–0	Tromsø	Drammen
15:30 CEST (UTC+2)	Keita (yellow card) 31' (goal) 73'; Madsen (yellow card) 37'; Abu (yellow card) 58'	Summary	Wangberg (yellow card) 23'; Gundersen (yellow card) 70'	Stadium: Marienlyst Stadion; Attendance: 7,123; Referee: Martin Lundby

24 July 2016 17	Lillestrøm	2–0	Strømsgodset	Lillestrøm
20:00 CEST (UTC+2)	Lundemo 45'; Mikalsen 48'; Kolstad (yellow card) 56'	Summary		Stadium: Åråsen Stadion; Attendance: 4,351; Referee: Tore Hansen

31 July 2016 18	Strømsgodset	2–2	Stabæk	Drammen
20:00 CEST (UTC+2)	Nana 2'; Pedersen 7'; Júnior (red card) 75'	Summary	Gorozia 5'; Vilsvik 30' (o.g.); Grossman (yellow card) 44'	Stadium: Marienlyst Stadion; Attendance: 6,179; Referee: Svein Oddvar Moen

7 August 2016 19	Brann	1–0	Strømsgodset	Bergen
18:00 CEST (UTC+2)	Vega 36'	Summary		Stadium: Brann Stadion; Attendance: 11,886; Referee: Kim Andre Johnsen

14 August 2016 20	Strømsgodset	1–1	Start	Drammen
18:00 CEST (UTC+2)	Pedersen 27' (pen.) (yellow card) 45'; Madsen (yellow card) 87'; Kastrati (yellow card) 90+2'	Summary	Robstad (yellow card) 16'; Johnson (yellow card) 27'; Vikstøl (yellow card) 77'; Bojang (yellow card) 81'; Salvesen 86'	Stadium: Marienlyst Stadion; Referee: Kai Erik Steen

21 August 2016 21	Sarpsborg 08	1–0	Strømsgodset	Sarpsborg
15:30 CEST (UTC+2)	Kirkevold 87'	Summary	Vilsvik (yellow card) 21'; Júnior (yellow card) 22'; Pedersen (red card) 90+1'	Stadium: Sarpsborg Stadion; Attendance: 4,323; Referee: Svein-Erik Edvartsen

27 August 2016 22	Strømsgodset	0–2	Molde	Drammen
15:30 CEST (UTC+2)	Høibråten (yellow card) 44'	Summary	Singh 32' (pen.); Sigurðarson 60'	Stadium: Marienlyst Stadion; Attendance: 6,783; Referee: Ola Hobber Nilsen

10 September 2016 23	Vålerenga	1–1	Strømsgodset	Oslo
15:30 CEST (UTC+2)	Juklerød 58'; Lundström (yellow card) 73'	Summary	Andersen 51'	Stadium: Ullevaal Stadion; Attendance: 8,422; Referee: Svein Oddvar Moen

18 September 2016 24	Aalesund	4–2	Strømsgodset	Ålesund
18:00 CEST (UTC+2)	Gyasi 14'; Carlsen 50'; B. H. Riise 56' (yellow card) 73'; Mos 62'	Report	Tokstad 1'; Hamoud (yellow card) 50'; Vilsvik (yellow card) 56'; Ovenstad (yellow card) 60'; Pedersen 90' (pen.)	Stadium: Color Line Stadion; Attendance: 5,634

25 September 2016 25	Strømsgodset	1–1	Odd	Drammen
18:00 CEST (UTC+2)	Adjei-Boateng 5'	Summary	Bentley 1'	Stadium: Marienlyst Stadion; Attendance: 6,703; Referee: Tommy Skjerven

30 September 2016 26	Bodø/Glimt	4–2	Strømsgodset	Bodø
18:00 CEST (UTC+2)	Halvorsen 54' (pen.); Azemi 58'; Bjørnbak 76'; Mockenhaupt 82'	Summary	Høiland 34', 48', (yellow card) 85'	Stadium: Aspmyra Stadion; Attendance: 2,840; Referee: Tom Harald Hagen

14 October 2016 27	Strømsgodset	1–1	Viking	Drammen
19:00 CEST (UTC+2)	Andersen 1'; Adjei-Boateng (yellow card) 62'	Summary	Ibrahim 57'; Bytyqi (yellow card) 78'	Stadium: Marienlyst Stadion; Attendance: 6,645; Referee: Espen Eskås

23 October 2016 28	Sogndal	0–1	Strømsgodset	Sogndalsfjøra
20:00 CEST (UTC+2)		Summary	Andersen 89'	Stadium: Fosshaugane Campus; Attendance: 2,375; Referee: Trond Ivar Døvle

30 October 2016 29	Strømsgodset	2–0	Rosenborg	Drammen
18:00 CEST (UTC+2)	Abu (yellow card) 19'; Parr 52'; Storflor 78'; Vaagan Moen (yellow card) 89'	Summary	Midtsjø (yellow card) 42'	Stadium: Marienlyst Stadion; Attendance: 7,661; Referee: Trygve Kjensli

6 November 2016 30	Haugesund	1–1	Strømsgodset	Haugesund
18:00 CEST (UTC+1)	Abdi 26'	Summary	Kiss 31' (o.g.); Vilsvik (yellow card) 33'; Madsen (yellow card) 54'; Glesnes (yellow card) 55'	Stadium: Haugesund Stadion; Attendance: 6,380; Referee: Kai Erik Steen

==== Table ====
Pos	Team	Pld	W	D	L	GF	GA	GD	Pts
5	Molde	30	13	6	11	48	42	+6	45
6	Sarpsborg 08	30	12	9	9	35	37	−2	45
7	Strømsgodset	30	12	8	10	44	40	+4	44
8	Viking	30	12	7	11	33	35	−2	43
9	Aalesund	30	12	6	12	46	51	−5	42

Source: Football Association of Norway (in Norwegian), Soccerway
Rules for classification: 1) Points; 2) Goal difference; 3) Goals scored; 4) Head-to-head points; 5) Head-to-head goal difference; 6) Head-to-head away goals scored (between two teams).

=== Norwegian Cup ===
13 April 2016 First Round	Kongsberg	1–8	Strømsgodset	Kongsberg
18:00 CEST (UTC+2)	H.Schia 44'	Summary	Nguen 2', 56', 75'; Ovenstad 11'; Moen 14'; Agouda 32'; Storflor 42'; M.Berg 58' (o.g.)	Stadium: Kongsberg kunstgress Referee: Mohammad Usman Aslam

26 April 2016 Second Round	Eidsvold Turn	0–1	Strømsgodset	Eidsvold
18:00 CEST (UTC+2)	P. Gawecki (yellow card) 49'; M. Trøen (yellow card) 78'; R. Edvartsen (yellow card) 79'	Summary	Pedersen (yellow card) 61'; Júnior 77'	Stadium: Myhrer Stadion; Attendance: 928; Referee: Anders Gjermshus

4 May 2016 Third Round	Vindbjart	1–2	Strømsgodset	Vennesla
18:00 CEST (UTC+2)	B. Boujar (red card) 7'; Ø. Gausdal 14', (yellow card) 33'; J. Jansen (yellow card) 75'	Summary	Abu (yellow card) 22'; Vilsvik 52'; Høiland 76'	Stadium: Moseidmoen; Attendance: 1,074; Referee: Jan Morten Tennøy

25 May 2016 Fourth Round	Strømsgodset	1–0	Stabæk	Drammen
18:00 CEST (UTC+2)	Pedersen 39'; Nguen (yellow card) 90'	Report	Issah (yellow card) 38'; Skjønsberg (yellow card) 90'	Stadium: Marienlyst Stadion; Attendance: 3,801; Referee: Kai Erik Steen

22 September 2016 Quarterfinal	Strømsgodset	2–0	Vålerenga	Drammen
20:00 CEST (UTC+2)	Nakkim 45' (o.g.); Pedersen 50' (pen.); Høiland (yellow card) 85'	Summary	Larsen (yellow card) 45'; Lundström (yellow card) 50'	Stadium: Marienlyst Stadion; Attendance: 5,018; Referee: Tore Hansen

27 October 2016 Semifinal	Strømsgodset	1–2	Kongsvinger	Drammen
20:00 CEST (UTC+2)	Tokstad 64'; Parr (yellow card) 72'	Report	Pålerud 55' (yellow card) 86'; Røyrane 73'	Stadium: Marienlyst Stadion; Attendance: 7,446; Referee: Tommy Skjerven

=== UEFA Europa League ===
==== Qualifying rounds ====
14 July 2016 Second qualifying round 1st leg	SønderjyskE (Denmark)	2–1	(Norway) Strømsgodset	Haderslev, Denmark
19:00 CEST (UTC+2)	Kløve 9'; Guira (yellow card) 45'; Uhre 82'	Summary	Pedersen 16' (yellow card) 90+6'; Hamoud (yellow card) 33'; Keita (yellow card) 40'	Stadium: Sydbank Park; Attendance: 4,795; Referee: Georgi Kabakov (Bulgaria)

21 July 2016 Second qualifying round 2nd leg	Strømsgodset (Norway)	2–2 (a.e.t.) (3–4 agg.)	(Denmark) SønderjyskE	Drammen, Norway
19:00 CEST (UTC+2)	Keita 17', 45+2'; Madsen (yellow card) 52'; Valsvik (yellow card) 65'; Nana (yellow card) 67'	Summary	Rømer (yellow card) 59'; Hende (yellow card) 60'; Uhre 69'; Kløve 120+1'	Stadium: Marienlyst Stadion; Referee: Steven McLean (Scotland)

== Squad statistics ==
As of match played 6 November 2016

=== Appearances and goals ===
No.	Pos	Nat	Player	Total		Tippeligaen		Norwegian Cup		Europa League	
No.	Pos	Nat	Player	Apps	Goals	Apps	Goals	Apps	Goals	Apps	Goals
1	GK	(Norway) NOR	Espen Bugge Pettersen	35	0	30	0	3	0	2	0
2	DF	(Norway) NOR	Mounir Hamoud	23	0	17+1	0	1+2	0	2	0
3	DF	(Norway) NOR	Jonathan Parr	33	2	24+2	2	5	0	0+2	0
4	DF	(Norway) NOR	Kim André Madsen	23	0	18	0	3	0	2	0
5	DF	(Norway) NOR	Jakob Glesnes	13	0	11	0	2	0	0	0
7	FW	(Norway) NOR	Tommy Høiland	26	5	10+11	4	2+3	1	0	0
8	MF	(Norway) NOR	Petter Vaagan Moen	25	3	7+13	2	4	1	0+1	0
9	MF	(Norway) NOR	Øyvind Storflor	28	5	19+5	4	2+1	1	1	0
10	FW	(Norway) NOR	Marcus Pedersen	25	12	14+5	8	3+1	3	2	1
11	MF	(Norway) NOR	Martin Rønning Ovenstad	21	2	12+5	1	3+1	1	0	0
15	MF	(Norway) NOR	Kristoffer Tokstad	10	2	8	1	2	1	0	0
17	DF	(Norway) NOR	Christopher Lindquist	1	0	0	0	1	0	0	0
19	MF	(Portugal) POR	Francisco Júnior	27	2	16+4	1	5	1	2	0
20	MF	(Ghana) GHA	Mohammed Abu	33	0	27	0	3+1	0	2	0
21	MF	(Norway) NOR	Mathias Gjerstrøm	6	0	1+5	0	0	0	0	0
22	MF	(Ghana) GHA	Nana	35	3	25+4	3	4	0	2	0
23	MF	(Norway) NOR	Eirik Ulland Andersen	10	3	7+1	3	2	0	0	0
26	DF	(Norway) NOR	Lars Christopher Vilsvik	37	4	28+1	3	5+1	1	2	0
28	DF	(Norway) NOR	Marius Høibråten	21	0	14+2	0	4+1	0	0	0
30	GK	(Poland) POL	Łukasz Jarosiński	3	0	0	0	3	0	0	0
34	FW	(Norway) NOR	Abdul-Basit Agouda	2	1	0+1	0	1	1	0	0
46	DF	(Norway) NOR	Sondre Solholm Johansen	1	0	0	0	0+1	0	0	0
69	FW	(Norway) NOR	Andreas Hoven	1	0	0+1	0	0	0	0	0
69	DF	(Norway) NOR	Kristoffer Hoven	2	0	0+1	0	0+1	0	0	0
93	MF	(Norway) NOR	Tokmac Nguen	18	6	11+3	3	1+3	3	0	0
Players away from Strømsgodset on loan:
Players who appeared for Strømsgodset no longer at the club:
15	FW	(Norway) NOR	Flamur Kastrati	17	2	4+8	2	2+1	0	1+1	0
23	FW	(Norway) NOR	Thomas Sørum	4	0	1+3	0	0	0	0	0
71	DF	(Norway) NOR	Gustav Valsvik	23	1	17	1	3+1	0	2	0
77	MF	(Norway) NOR	Muhamed Keita	17	6	9+4	4	2	0	2	2

=== Goal scorers ===
Place	Position	Nation	Number	Name	Tippeligaen	Norwegian Cup	Europa League	Total
1	FW	(Norway)	10	Marcus Pedersen	8	3	1	12
2	MF	(Norway)	77	Muhamed Keita	4	0	2	6
2	MF	(Norway)	93	Tokmac Nguen	3	3	0	6
4	FW	(Norway)	7	Tommy Høiland	4	1	0	5
5	DF	(Norway)	26	Lars Christopher Vilsvik	3	1	0	4
6	MF	(Ghana)	22	Nana	3	0	0	3
6	MF	(Norway)	23	Eirik Ulland Andersen	3	0	0	3
6	MF	(Norway)	9	Øyvind Storflor	3	0	0	3
6	MF	(Norway)	8	Petter Vaagan Moen	2	1	0	3
10	FW	(Norway)	15	Flamur Kastrati	2	0	0	2
10	DF	(Norway)	3	Jonathan Parr	2	0	0	2
10	MF	(Norway)	11	Martin Rønning Ovenstad	1	1	0	2
10	MF	(Portugal)	19	Francisco Júnior	1	1	0	2
10	MF	(Norway)	9	Øyvind Storflor	1	1	0	2
10	MF	(Norway)	15	Kristoffer Tokstad	1	1	0	2
10				Own goal	1	1	0	2
17	DF	(Norway)	71	Gustav Valsvik	1	0	0	1
17	FW	(Norway)	34	Abdul-Basit Agouda	0	1	0	1
				TOTALS	43	15	3	61

=== Disciplinary record ===
Number	Nation	Position	Name	Tippeligaen		Norwegian Cup		Europa League		Total	
Number	Nation	Position	Name	Yellow card	Red card	Yellow card	Red card	Yellow card	Red card	Yellow card	Red card
2	(Norway)	DF	Mounir Hamoud	3	0	0	0	1	0	4	0
3	(Norway)	DF	Jonathan Parr	1	0	1	0	0	0	2	0
4	(Norway)	DF	Kim André Madsen	4	0	0	0	1	0	5	0
5	(Norway)	DF	Jakob Glesnes	1	0	0	0	0	0	1	0
7	(Norway)	FW	Tommy Høiland	4	0	1	0	0	0	5	0
8	(Norway)	MF	Petter Vaagan Moen	3	0	0	0	0	0	3	0
9	(Norway)	FW	Øyvind Storflor	1	0	0	0	0	0	1	0
10	(Norway)	FW	Marcus Pedersen	4	1	1	0	1	0	6	1
11	(Norway)	MF	Martin Rønning Ovenstad	2	0	0	0	0	0	2	0
15	(Norway)	FW	Flamur Kastrati	2	1	0	0	0	0	2	1
19	(Portugal)	MF	Francisco Júnior	3	2	0	0	0	0	3	2
20	(Ghana)	MF	Mohammed Abu	5	0	1	0	0	0	6	0
22	(Ghana)	MF	Nana	3	0	0	0	1	0	4	0
26	(Norway)	DF	Lars Christopher Vilsvik	3	0	0	0	0	0	3	0
28	(Norway)	DF	Marius Høibråten	2	0	0	0	0	0	2	0
71	(Norway)	DF	Gustav Valsvik	1	0	0	0	1	0	2	0
77	(Norway)	MF	Muhamed Keita	1	0	0	0	1	0	2	0
93	(Norway)	MF	Tokmac Nguen	1	0	1	0	0	0	2	0
			TOTALS	44	4	5	0	6	0	55	4
