= 2018 Norwegian Football Cup final =

- Event: 2018 Norwegian Football Cup
Rosenborg	Strømsgodset
4	1
- Date: 2 December 2018
- Venue: Ullevaal Stadion, Oslo
- Referee: Trond Ivar Døvle
- Attendance: 22,182

The 2018 Norwegian Football Cup final was the final match of the 2018 Norwegian Football Cup, the 113th season of the Norwegian Football Cup, the premier Norwegian football cup competition organized by the Football Association of Norway (NFF). The match was played on 2 December 2018 at the Ullevaal Stadion in Oslo, and opposed two Eliteserien sides Rosenborg and Strømsgodset. Rosenborg defeated Strømsgodset 4–1 to claim the Norwegian Cup for a twelfth time in their history and equaled Odd's record number of cup titles.

== Route to the final ==
Rosenborg		Round	Strømsgodset	
Trygg/Lade (D4); A 4–2	Zekhnini 28', Lundemo 47', Søderlund 52', Bjørnstad 90'	First round	Vestfossen (D3); A 4–1	Abdellaoue 8', 54', Pellegrino 58', Andersen 79'
Steinkjer (D3); A 5–0	Trondsen 28', Botheim 30', 45', 90', Stamnestrø 85'	Second round	Valdres (D3); A 3–1	Tokstad 31', Pellegrino 76', Jradi 83'
Brattvåg (D2); A 1–0	Søderlund 64'	Third round	Bærum (D2); A 3–0	Lyngen 51' o.g., Abdellaoue 59', Andersen 63'
Odd (ES); H 2–2 (5–3 p)	Konradsen 25', Søderlund 81'	Fourth round	Ranheim (ES); H 2–0	Andersen 57', Jradi 90+2'
Vålerenga (ES); H 2–0	Denić 17', Søderlund 54'	Quarter-final	Haugesund (ES); A 1–0	Abdellaoue 16'
Start (ES); H 2–1	Bendtner 55', Søderlund 90+3'	Semi-final	Lillestrøm (ES); H 3–0	Abdellaoue 49', 52', 83'

- (ES) = Eliteserien team
- (D1) = 1. divisjon team
- (D2) = 2. divisjon team
- (D3) = 3. divisjon team
- (D4) = 4. divisjon team

== Match ==
=== Details ===
2 December 2018
13:15 CET (UTC+1)

Rosenborg	4–1	Strømsgodset
Jensen 18'; Konradsen 40'; Bendtner 52', 90+4'	Report	Abdellaoue 13'

Ullevaal Stadion, Oslo
Attendance: 22,182
Referee: Trond Ivar Døvle (Fjellhamar)

Rosenborg	Strømsgodset

Rosenborg:
GK	1	(Norway) André Hansen
RB	2	(Norway) Vegar Eggen Hedenstad	(yellow card) 62'	(substituted off) 75'
CB	4	(Norway) Tore Reginiussen
CB	16	(Norway) Even Hovland
LB	3	(Norway) Birger Meling
RM	7	(Denmark) Mike Jensen (c)
CM	8	(Norway) Anders Konradsen
LM	15	(Norway) Anders Trondsen
RW	23	(Norway) Pål André Helland	(yellow card) 43'	(substituted off) 81'
CF	9	(Denmark) Nicklas Bendtner
LW	28	(Nigeria) Samuel Adegbenro		(substituted off) 56'
Substitutions:
GK	24	(Norway) Arild Østbø
FW	10	(Iceland) Matthías Vilhjálmsson
FW	11	(Norway) Yann-Erik de Lanlay		(substituted on) 56'
FW	14	(Norway) Alexander Søderlund		(substituted on) 81'
MF	17	(Sweden) Jonathan Levi		(substituted on) 75'
MF	25	(Norway) Marius Lundemo
DF	26	(Bosnia and Herzegovina) Besim Šerbečić
Head Coach:
(Netherlands) Rini Coolen

Strømsgodset:
GK	40	(Norway) Morten Sætra
RB	26	(Norway) Lars Christopher Vilsvik	(substituted off) 82'
CB	2	(Norway) Mounir Hamoud
CB	5	(Norway) Jakob Glesnes (c)
LB	3	(Norway) Jonathan Parr
CM	6	(Norway) Henning Hauger
CM	7	(Norway) Herman Stengel	(substituted off) 82'
RW	90	(Norway) Amahl Pellegrino	(substituted off) 76'
AM	93	(Norway) Tokmac Nguen
LW	23	(Norway) Eirik Ulland Andersen
CF	30	(Norway) Mustafa Abdellaoue
Substitutions:
GK	1	(Norway) Espen Bugge Pettersen
MF	8	(Norway) Johan Hove
FW	11	(Norway) Kristoffer Tokstad	(substituted on) 82'
DF	17	(Norway) Christoffer Lindquist
MF	18	(Norway) Martin Rønning Ovenstad	(substituted on) 82'
MF	19	(Guinea-Bissau) Francisco Júnior
DF	39	(Norway) Lars Sætra	(substituted on) 76'
Head Coach:
(Norway) Bjørn Petter Ingebretsen

MATCH OFFICIALS

- Assistant referees:
  - Morten Jensen (Fjellhamar FK)
  - Eivin Christofer Møllerud Hansen (Grorud IL)
- Fourth official: Kristoffer Horne Hagenes (TIL Hovding)

MATCH RULES

- 90 minutes.
- 30 minutes of extra-time if necessary.
- Penalty shoot-out if scores still level.
- Seven named substitutes.
- Maximum of three substitutions.

== See also ==
- 2018 Norwegian Football Cup
- 2018 Eliteserien
- 2018 1. divisjon
- 2018 in Norwegian football
