= Loti Celina =

Norwegian-Kosovar footballer (born 2000)

Personal information
- Date of birth: 5 June 2000 (age 26)
- Place of birth: Fjell, Drammen, Norway
- Height: 1.72 m (5 ft 8 in)
- Position: Right-back

Team information
- Current team: Åskollen FK
- Number: 9

Youth career
- 2011–2020: Strømsgodset
- 2020–2021: Swansea City

Senior career*
Years	Team	Apps	(Gls)
2015–2017	Strømsgodset 3	21	(3)
2016–2020	Strømsgodset 2	49	(1)
2021–2022	Partizani Tirana	1	(0)
2023–2024	Egnatia	0	(0)
2024	Sollentuna	10	(0)
2025–	Åskollen FK	9	(2)

International career^{‡}
2017–2018	Kosovo U19	7	(0)
- * Club domestic league appearances and goals as of 7 February 2024 ‡ National team caps and goals as of 16 October 2018

Loti Celina (born 5 June 2000) is a professional footballer who plays as a right-back for Norwegian club Åskollen FK. Born in Norway, he has represented Kosovo at youth level.

== Club career ==
=== Early career ===
Celina was born and raised in Fjell, Drammen in a family of footballers where his two older brothers, Behadil and Bersant were professional footballers, the latter is one of the most important players in Kosovo national team. He at the age of 11 started playing football in Strømsgodset with whom he played in all youth teams, including senior level with which debut on 26 April 2017 in the 2017 Norwegian Cup first round against Åssiden after coming on as a substitute at 56th minute in place of Mounir Hamoud.

During the second half of the 2019–20 season, Celina was on long trial at Swansea City U23, where on 3 February 2020, he played in a league match which ended in a 0–4 home defeat against Newcastle United U23 after being named in the starting line-up, but unfortunately this test failed even though it was warned that they would sign contract.

=== Partizani Tirana ===
On 31 January 2021, Celina signed his first professional contract with Kategoria Superiore side Partizani Tirana after agreeing to a 2 1/2-year deal. On 26 May 2021, he made his debut in a 2–4 away win against Bylis after coming on as a substitute at 79th minute in place of Eraldo Çinari.

=== Egnatia ===
In July 2023, Celina joined Kategoria Superiore side Egnatia and received squad number 15.

== International career ==
On 8 February 2017, Celina received a call-up from Kosovo U19 for a five-day training camp in Ulqin. On 1 October 2017, he was named as part of the Kosovo U19 squad for 2018 UEFA European Under-19 Championship qualifications. Two days later, Celina made his debut with Kosovo U19 in a match against Austria U19 after being named in the starting line-up.

== Career statistics ==
=== Club ===
As of 7 February 2024

Appearances and goals by club, season and competition
Club	Season	League			Cup		Continental		Other		Total	
Club	Season	Division	Apps	Goals	Apps	Goals	Apps	Goals	Apps	Goals	Apps	Goals
Strømsgodset 3	2015	3. divisjon	5	1	0	0	—				5	1
Strømsgodset 3	2016	3. divisjon	15	2	0	0	—		2 (Note: Appearance with Strømsgodset 2)	0	15	2
Strømsgodset	2017	Eliteserien	0	0	1	0	—		1 (Note: Appearance with Strømsgodset 3)	0	1	0
Strømsgodset	Total		20	3	1	0	—		3	0	24	3
Strømsgodset 2	2017	3. divisjon	15	0	0	0	—				15	0
Strømsgodset 2	2018	3. divisjon	14	0	0	0	—				14	0
Strømsgodset 2	2019	3. divisjon	18	1	0	0	—				18	1
Strømsgodset 2	Total		47	1	0	0	—				47	1
Swansea City U23	2019–20	Premier League 2	1	0	0	0	—				1	0
Partizani Tirana	2020–21	Kategoria Superiore	1	0	0	0	—				1	0
Partizani Tirana	2021–22	Kategoria Superiore	0	0	0	0	3	0	—		3	0
Partizani Tirana	Total		2	0	0	0	3	0	—		5	0
Egnatia	2023–24	Kategoria Superiore	0	0	0	0	0	0	—		0	0
Sollentuna	2024	Ettan	9	0	0	0	0	0	—		9	0
Career total			69	4	1	0	3	0	3	0	76	4
