= Francisco Júnior =

Bissau-Guinean footballer

Personal information
- Full name: Francisco Santos da Silva Júnior
- Date of birth: 18 January 1992 (age 34)
- Place of birth: Bissau, Guinea-Bissau
- Height: 1.72 m (5 ft 8 in)
- Position: Midfielder

Youth career
- –2007: Benfica de Bissau
- 2007–2011: Benfica

Senior career*
Years	Team	Apps	(Gls)
2012–2016	Everton	0	(0)
2013–2014	→ Vitesse Arnhem (loan)	2	(0)
2014	→ Strømsgodset (loan)	12	(1)
2015	→ Port Vale (loan)	1	(0)
2015–2016	→ Wigan Athletic (loan)	10	(1)
2016–2018	Strømsgodset	67	(2)
2019	Vendsyssel FF	10	(0)
2019–2020	Hapoel Haifa	23	(0)
2020–2022	Gaz Metan Mediaș	45	(1)
2022–2024	Sepsi OSK	27	(0)
2024–2025	Botoșani	11	(0)
Total		208	(5)

International career
2011	Portugal U19	3	(0)
2012–2013	Portugal U21	2	(1)
2017–2019	Guinea-Bissau	7	(0)
- * Club domestic league appearances and goals

Francisco Santos da Silva Júnior (born 18 January 1992) is a Bissau-Guinean former professional footballer who played as a midfielder. He represented Portugal internationally at under-19 and under-21 level before being called up to the Guinea-Bissau senior team in 2017.

Originally from Guinea-Bissau, he was signed by Portuguese side Benfica whilst with Benfica de Bissau in 2007. He signed with English club Everton in February 2012, who loaned him out to Vitesse Arnhem, Strømsgodset, Port Vale, and Wigan Athletic. He joined Strømsgodset on a free transfer in February 2016 and was an unused substitute in the 2018 Norwegian Football Cup final. After two seasons, he joined Vendsyssel FF (Denmark) in December 2018. He spent the 2019–20 season with Israeli club Hapoel Haifa and then joined Romanian club Gaz Metan Mediaș in October 2020. He switched to Sepsi OSK in May 2022 and won the Supercupa României and Cupa României with the club. He signed with Botoșani in August 2024.

== Club career ==
=== Early career ===
Júnior started his club career in Bissau with Sport Bissau e Benfica in Guinea-Bissau at youth level, he was spotted by talent scouts from FC Porto and Sporting CP but soon transferred to Benfica. His professional career began with Benfica in 2008, and he was contracted to the club until 2013 as there was a clause in the contract that automatically converted Júnior's youth contract into a professional contract.

Júnior was loaned to U.D. Leiria in 2011 but never showed up to play for Leiria, and it was found that the player had been training with Manchester City unbeknownst to Benfica. Benfica's president Luís Filipe Vieira told Manchester City to return the player to Benfica and sent the English club a plane ticket for Júnior's return. Vieira also threatened to report Manchester City to FIFA. In July 2011, Manchester-based media reported that Júnior was on trial with Manchester City, playing with their Development XI team in a friendly against Altrincham. Guinea-Bissauan sports agent Catió Balde and Anglo-Iranian lawyer Kia Joorabchian intervened. Manchester City were forced to release the player. Manchester City compensated Benfica with €1.5million.

=== Everton ===
In February 2012, Júnior signed professional terms with Everton having signed on a free transfer. In an interview with Guinea-Bissauan website Bola na Bantaba, Júnior stated that he signed for Everton because he "was tired of the impasse between Benfica and Manchester City and businessmen who wanted to win more than they should". He made his debut for the "Toffees" under David Moyes in a 2–1 League Cup defeat to Leeds United at Elland Road; he was taken off for Phil Neville at half-time.

On 1 September 2013, Júnior signed with Dutch Eredivisie side Vitesse Arnhem, in a season-long loan deal. This loan deal was later cancelled due to a knee injury, and a new five-month loan deal with Norwegian Tippeliga side Strømsgodset was signed in February 2014. The loan deal was later extended by one month and expired in August. In December 2014 he began training with Scottish Premier League leaders Celtic under Ronny Deila, his former manager at Strømsgodset. On 26 March 2015, Júnior joined League One side Port Vale on loan until the end of the 2014–15 season. "Valiants" manager Rob Page said that "I'd like to thank Roberto Martínez for his co-operation with getting this deal over the line." He started away at Leyton Orient two days later, before being taken off for Sam Johnson after goalkeeper Chris Neal got sent off on 54 minutes. This proved to be his only appearance for the club as he picked up an injury and was ruled out for the rest of the campaign.

He returned to League One with newly-relegated Wigan Athletic after joining on an initial one-month loan in July 2015. He made his debut for the "Latics" on 8 August in a 2–0 defeat to Coventry City at the Ricoh Arena. His loan was extended until 16 January after being described as a "revelation" by manager Gary Caldwell. However, he was forced to return to Everton in December for treatment on a long-standing groin problem.

"Things happened, most of them were my mistakes and my fault... When I came to the UK, I was in Manchester and it was one week before I lost my mum... when I lost my mum it was like I lost my world... I lost my head.... they [Everton] didn’t care about me.. that is one of the things why I didn’t make it at Everton. They were always trying to see what I was doing wrong but never why or trying to help me."

— Speaking in an interview in March 2016, Júnior took responsibility for his failure to make the grade at Goodison but also criticised the club.

=== Strømsgodset ===
In February 2016, he signed a two-year contract with the Norwegian Tippeligaen club Strømsgodset. He scored one goal in 24 appearances in the 2016 season, as the club posted an eighth-place finish. He played 29 of the club's 30 league games in the 2017 season as Strømsgodset finished in fourth place, missing out on a UEFA Europa League qualification place by a single point. Strømsgodset reached the Norwegian Football Cup final, however, he was not selected by head coach Bjørn Petter Ingebretsen and was instead an unused substitute in what finished as 4–1 defeat to Rosenborg at the Ullevaal Stadion.

=== Vendsyssel ===
On 14 December 2018, Júnior signed a contract with Danish Superligaen club Vendsyssel to keep him at the Hjørring Stadium until summer 2021. Jens Berthel Askou's VFF finished in the relegation play-off places at the end of the 2018–19 season and then lost their top-flight status with a 4–3 aggregate defeat to Lyngby.

=== Hapoel Haifa ===
Júnior joined Israeli Premier League side Hapoel Haifa in August 2019, signing a contract to run for one season with the option of a second; he said that Nir Bitton recommended he find a club in Israel. Haim Silvas's "Sharks" were in sixth-place when the 2019–20 season was curtailed due to the COVID-19 pandemic in Israel, with Júnior having made 28 appearances at the Sammy Ofer Stadium.

=== Romania ===
On 12 October 2020, Júnior signed a two-year contract with Romanian Liga I club Gaz Metan Mediaș. He made 24 appearances in the 2020–21 season and played 23 games in the 2021–22 campaign, with the club being relegated in summer 2022 after being deducted 42 points due to financial reasons. He remained in Liga I however, after signing with Sepsi OSK in May 2022. He entered the 2022 Supercupa României as an 83rd-minute substitute, helping Sepsi to beat CFR Cluj 2–1 at the Stadionul Francisc von Neuman. On 24 May 2023, he was an unused substitute in the Cupa României final as Sepsi defeated Universitatea Cluj on penalties. He did not feature after October 2023 and left the club in February 2024.

On 7 August 2024, Júnior joined fellow Liga I club Botoșani on a two-year contract. He appeared 13 times in the first half of the 2024–25 season.

== International career ==
Júnior was called up for Portugal under-19 team in January 2011 for the four-team round-robin friendly La Manga Club tournament. His debut came against Slovakia, having replaced Rúben Pinto in the 73rd minute. He came on as a substitute in the 55th minute in the game against Norway and he helped Portugal retain their title, starting in the 3–1 win over Sweden in the tournament's final game. After leaving Benfica he rejected the chance to join the Portuguese under-20 team and told Guinea-Bissaun media in June 2012 that he wants to represent Guinea-Bissau. The Guinea-Bissau national team called him up in February 2012 to face Cameroon in the 2013 Africa Cup of Nations qualification campaign, but he did not receive notification in time. In October 2012, he played for Portugal's under 21 side in a friendly against Ukraine.

He was selected by Baciro Candé in the Guinea-Bissau squad for the 2017 Africa Cup of Nations. He made his debut on the opening match of the tournament, in a 1–1 draw with hosts Gabon on 14 January 2017. He announced his retirement from international football on 25 March 2019.

== Career statistics ==
=== Club ===
Appearances and goals by club, season and competition
Club	Season	League			National cup (Note: Includes KNVB Cup, Norwegian Cup, Danish Cup, Israel State Cup, Cupa României)		League cup (Note: Includes EFL Cup, Toto Cup)		Other		Total	
Club	Season	Division	Apps	Goals	Apps	Goals	Apps	Goals	Apps	Goals	Apps	Goals
Everton	2012–13	Premier League	0	0	—		1	0	—		1	0
Everton	2013–14	Premier League	0	0	—		—		—		0	0
Everton	Total		0	0	0	0	1	0	0	0	1	0
Vitesse Arnhem (loan)	2013–14	Eredivisie	2	0	1	1	—		—		3	1
Strømsgodset (loan)	2014	Tippeligaen	12	1	1	0	—		2 (Note: Appearances in UEFA Champions League)	0	15	1
Port Vale (loan)	2014–15	League One	1	0	—		—		—		1	0
Wigan Athletic (loan)	2015–16	League One	10	1	1	0	—		1 (Note: Appearance(s) in the EFL Trophy.)	0	12	1
Strømsgodset	2016	Tippeligaen	20	1	3	0	—		2 (Note: Appearances in UEFA Europa League)	0	25	1
Strømsgodset	2017	Eliteserien	29	1	1	0	—		—		30	1
Strømsgodset	2018	Eliteserien	18	0	3	0	—		—		21	0
Strømsgodset	Total		67	2	7	0	0	0	2	0	76	2
Vendsyssel FF	2018–19	Danish Superliga	10	0	1	0	—		4 (Note: Appearance(s) in the play-offs.)	0	15	0
Hapoel Haifa	2019–20	Israeli Premier League	23	0	3	0	2	0	—		28	0
Gaz Metan Mediaș	2020–21	Liga I	23	0	1	0	—		—		24	0
Gaz Metan Mediaș	2021–22	Liga I	22	1	1	0	—		—		23	1
Gaz Metan Mediaș	Total		45	1	2	0	0	0	0	0	47	1
Sepsi OSK	2022–23	Liga I	21	0	4	1	—		1 (Note: Appearance in Supercupa României)	0	26	1
Sepsi OSK	2023–24	Liga I	6	0	0	0	—		4 (Note: Appearances in UEFA Europa Conference League)	0	10	0
Sepsi OSK	Total		27	0	4	1	0	0	5	0	36	1
Botoșani	2024–25	Liga I	11	0	2	0	—		—		13	0
Career total			208	5	22	2	3	0	14	0	247	7

=== International ===
Appearances and goals by national team and year
National team	Year	Apps	Goals
Guinea-Bissau	2017	5	0
Guinea-Bissau	2018	2	0
Total		7	0

== Honours ==
Strømsgodset

- Norwegian Football Cup runner-up: 2018

Sepsi OSK

- Supercupa României: 2022, 2023
- Cupa României: 2022–23
