= Tokmac Nguen =

Norwegian footballer (born 1993)

Personal information
- Full name: Tokmac Chol Nguen
- Date of birth: 20 October 1993 (age 33)
- Place of birth: Kakuma, Kenya
- Height: 1.74 m (5 ft 9 in)
- Position: Winger

Team information
- Current team: Tochigi City
- Number: 93

Youth career
- Strømsgodset

Senior career*
Years	Team	Apps	(Gls)
2011–2019	Strømsgodset	78	(16)
2014	→ Bærum (loan)	11	(2)
2015	→ Mjøndalen (loan)	6	(2)
2019–2024	Ferencváros	129	(34)
2024–2026	Djurgårdens IF	51	(15)
2026	Al-Okhdood	13	(1)
2026–	Tochigi City	2	(0)

International career^{‡}
2011	Norway U18	1	(0)
2012	Norway U19	1	(0)
2021	Norway	1	(0)
- * Club domestic league appearances and goals as of 16 August 2026 ‡ National team caps and goals as of 22:39, 24 March 2021 (UTC)

Tokmac Chol Nguen (South Sudanese born 20 October 1993) is a professional footballer who plays as a winger for Japanese J2 League side Tochigi City. Born a South Sudanese refugee in Kenya, he plays for the Norway national team.

== Club career ==
=== In Norway ===
Nguen made his debut for Strømsgodset on 28 August 2011 against Fredrikstad. The game ended 1–1.

He was injured most of the 2012 season, and only played four minutes in one match as a sub. In 2013, when his team became champions, he was subbed on in two matches, with a combined 17 minutes of play. In 2014 he was used as a sub in three matches, playing 76 minutes in total, as well as a cup game.

On 6 August 2014, he was loaned out to 1. Divisjon club Bærum for the remainder of the 2014 season.

On 10 August 2015, he was loaned out to Tippeligaen club Mjøndalen for the rest of the 2015 season.

=== Ferencváros ===
In June 2020, Nguen was given a written warning by the Hungarian Football Federation for celebrating his goal for Ferencvárosi TC against Puskás Akadémia FC by displaying a message on his undershirt condemning the murder of George Floyd. Ferencváros ultras are notoriously oriented towards the political right, so they did not necessarily approve of this political message.

On 16 June 2020, he became champion with Ferencváros by beating Budapest Honvéd FC at the Hidegkuti Nándor Stadion on the 30th match day of the 2019–20 Nemzeti Bajnokság I season.

On 29 September 2020, he was member of the Ferencváros team which qualified for the 2020–21 UEFA Champions League group stage after beating Molde FK on 3–3 aggregate (away goals) at the Groupama Aréna.

In the first round of the 2020–21 UEFA Champions League he scored twice against 2019 Allsvenskan-winner Djurgårdens IF Fotboll at Groupama Aréna on 19 August 2020. He scored his first group stage goal against FC Dynamo Kyiv, a 59th minute goal to bring the match to 2–1. Ferencváros would eventually equalize in the 90th minute.

On 20 April 2021, Ferencváros won the 2020–21 Nemzeti Bajnokság I season by beating archrival Újpest FC 3–0 at the Groupama Aréna. The goals were scored by Myrto Uzuni (3rd and 77th minute) and Nguen (30th minute).

In Hungary, he is nicknamed "tökmag", Hungarian for pumpkin seed, because of the resemblance of his name (Tokmac) and the hungarian noun (Tökmag).

On 5 May 2023, he won the 2022–23 Nemzeti Bajnokság I with Ferencváros, after Kecskemét lost 1–0 to Honvéd at the Bozsik Aréna on the 30th matchday.

=== Djurgårdens IF ===
On 25 March 2024, Nguen joined Djurgårdens IF signing a two-year deal.

On 8 April 2024, Nguen made his Allsvenskan debut, coming off the bench in the 79th minute at home against BK Häcken, helping the team come back from 0–3 to a 3–3 end result, scoring two goals.

=== Al-Okhdood ===
On 17 January 2026, Nguen joined Al-Okhdood.

== International career ==
Nguen was born in a refugee camp in Kenya to South Sudanese Dinka father and an Ethiopian Oromo mother, and moved to Norway at the age of 5. Nguen has made appearances for the Norway U18, and U19 squads. He was called up by the South Sudan national team in September 2019, but did not want to join the team, since he wanted to play for Norway. He was called up by the Norway national team in March 2021. He made his debut for Norway on 24 March 2021 in a World Cup qualifier against Gibraltar.

== Career statistics ==
=== Club ===
As of match played 16 August 2026

Appearances and goals by club, season and competition
Club	Season	League			National Cup		Europe		Total	
Club	Season	Division	Apps	Goals	Apps	Goals	Apps	Goals	Apps	Goals
Strømsgodset	2011	Tippeligaen	1	0	0	0	–		1	0
Strømsgodset	2012	Tippeligaen	1	0	0	0	–		1	0
Strømsgodset	2013	Tippeligaen	2	0	0	0	–		2	0
Strømsgodset	2014	Tippeligaen	3	0	1	0	–		4	0
Strømsgodset	2015	Tippeligaen	1	0	1	0	–		2	0
Strømsgodset	2016	Tippeligaen	14	3	4	3	–		18	6
Strømsgodset	2017	Eliteserien	28	6	2	0	–		30	6
Strømsgodset	2018	Eliteserien	28	7	5	0	–		33	7
Strømsgodset	Total		78	16	13	3	0	0	91	19
Bærum (loan)	2014	1. divisjon	11	2	0	0	–		11	2
Mjøndalen (loan)	2015	Tippeligaen	6	2	0	0	–		6	2
Ferencváros	2018–19	Nemzeti Bajnokság I	12	4	2	0	–		14	4
Ferencváros	2019–20	Nemzeti Bajnokság I	30	8	1	0	14	4	45	12
Ferencváros	2020–21	Nemzeti Bajnokság I	32	11	2	0	11	4	44	15
Ferencváros	2021–22	Nemzeti Bajnokság I	28	9	3	1	12	2	43	12
Ferencváros	2022–23	Nemzeti Bajnokság I	20	1	0	0	14	2	34	3
Ferencváros	2023–24	Nemzeti Bajnokság I	7	1	0	0	4	0	11	1
Ferencváros	Total		129	34	8	1	55	12	192	47
Djurgården	2024	Allsvenskan	22	6	0	0	9	3	31	9
Djurgården	2025	Allsvenskan	29	9	3	1	5	1	37	11
Djurgården	Total		51	15	3	1	14	4	68	20
Al-Okhdood	2026–27	Saudi Pro League	13	1	0	0	0	0	13	1
Tochigi City FC	2026–27	J2 League	2	0	0	0	0	0	2	0
Career total			290	70	24	5	69	16	383	91

== Honours ==
Strømsgodset

- Tippeligaen: 2013

Ferencváros

- Nemzeti Bajnokság I: 2018–19, 2019–20, 2020–21, 2021–22, 2022–23, 2023–24
- Magyar Kupa: 2021–22

Individual

- UEFA Conference League Team of the Season: 2024–25
