= Christian Rubio Sivodedov =

Swedish footballer (born 1997)

Personal information
- Date of birth: 7 November 1997 (age 29)
- Place of birth: Sundsvall, Sweden
- Height: 1.76 m (5 ft 9 1/2 in)
- Position: Midfielder

Team information
- Current team: Norrby
- Number: 13

Youth career
- 2004–2013: Djurgårdens IF
- 2015–2016: Schalke 04

Senior career*
Years	Team	Apps	(Gls)
2014	Djurgårdens IF	6	(0)
2016–2017	Schalke 04 II	2	(0)
2017–2018	Strømsgodset	9	(0)
2018	→ GIF Sundsvall (loan)	8	(0)
2018	GIF Sundsvall	3	(0)
2019–2021	Akropolis IF	69	(7)
2022–	Norrby	2	(0)

International career
2012–2013	Sweden U17	7	(1)
2014–2016	Sweden U19	10	(0)
- * Club domestic league appearances and goals as of 11 April 2022

Christian Rubio Sivodedov (born 7 November 1997) is a Swedish footballer who plays for Norrby as a midfielder.

== Career ==
=== Djurgårdens IF ===
Rubio Sivodedov started playing football in Djurgårdens IF at the age of six. During his youth years in Djurgården Rubio went on trials at both Manchester City and Newcastle United. He made his Allsvenskan debut for Djugårdens IF in the 2014 season.

=== Schalke 04 ===
On the 29 January 2015, he joined German side Schalke 04.

=== Strømsgodset ===
Sivodedov joined Norwegian club Strømsgodset in 2017. In March 2018, he was loaned out to GIF Sundsvall for the summer. After coming back from loan, the player's agent said that he had no future at Strømsgodset. His contract with Strømsgodset expired on 31 July 2018. Strømsgodset announced that he had joined GIF Sundsvall on a permanent transfer.

=== Norrby ===
On 20 January 2022, Rubio Sivodedov signed a two-year contract with Norrby.

== Personal life ==
The last name "Rubio" comes from his Cuban-born father while the last name "Sivodedov" comes from his Russian-born mother.
