= Łukasz Jarosiński =

Polish goalkeeping coach and goalkeeper

Personal information
- Full name: Łukasz Zdzisław Jarosiński
- Date of birth: 7 October 1988 (age 38)
- Place of birth: Wałbrzych, Poland
- Height: 1.93 m (6 ft 4 in)
- Position: Goalkeeper

Team information
- Current team: Vålerenga (goalkeeping coach)

Youth career
- –2006: Górnik/Zagłębie Wałbrzych
- 2007–2012: Wisła Kraków ME

Senior career*
| Years | Team | Apps | (Gls) |
| 2007–2012 | Wisła Kraków | 1 | (0) |
| 2008 | → Polonia/Sparta Świdnica (loan) | 16 | (0) |
| 2010–2011 | → Górnik Polkowice (loan) | 0 | (0) |
| 2011 | → MKS Kluczbork (loan) | 1 | (0) |
| 2012–2013 | Alta IF | 45 | (0) |
| 2014–2015 | Hønefoss BK | 37 | (0) |
| 2015–2017 | Strømsgodset | 0 | (0) |
| 2017–2019 | HamKam | 82 | (0) |
| 2020 | KÍ Klaksvík | 7 | (0) |
| 2021 | HamKam | 0 | (0) |
| 2022–2024 | Vålerenga 2 | 1 | (0) |
| 2024 | Vålerenga | 0 | (0) |

Managerial career
- 2021–2024: Vålerenga (youth goalkeeping coach)
- 2024–: Vålerenga (goalkeeping coach)
- * Club domestic league appearances and goals as of 25 October 2024

Łukasz Zdzisław Jarosiński (born 7 October 1988) is a Polish former professional footballer who serves as the goalkeeping coach for Norwegian club Vålerenga.

== Club career ==
Jarosiński spent his youth years with Górnik/Zagłębie Wałbrzych until December 2006. In January 2007, the 19-year-old signed for Wisła Kraków. On 19 May 2007, he made his debut for the club, when he played the full 90 minutes in the 0–4 loss against Dyskobolia Grodzisk in the 28th round of the 2006–07 Ekstraklasa season. This was his only match for the first team. After the establishment of the Młoda Ekstraklasa, he played 25 matches for Wisła Kraków ME and even scored a goal.

In the 2008–09 season, Jarosiński went on loan to fourth division side Polonia/Sparta Świdnica, and played 16 matches for the club. In the 2010–11 season, he went on loan to second division side Górnik Polkowice, but did not feature for the club. In the 2011–12 season, he went on loan to third-tier outfit MKS Kluczbork, and played one match.

On 15 March 2012, Jarosiński then went on a free transfer to Norwegian First Division club Alta IF, where he became the first choice goalkeeper. He won the player of the year award in the club in both the 2012 and 2013 season. After the club was relegated to the second division in 2012, he helped them win promotion in the 2013 season.

On 17 December 2013, he signed a three-year contract with fellow Norwegian First Division club Hønefoss BK.

On 31 July 2015, Jarosiński was signed by Tippeligaen club Strømsgodset Toppfotball for an undisclosed sum, as a replacement for reserve goalkeeper Anders Gundersen, who had gone on loan.

On 18 January 2017, Jarosiński was signed by then 2. divisjon club Hamarkameratene, where he helped to win the club promotion to the Norwegian First Division. At Hamarkameratene he regularly started as the first choice goalkeeper.

He then joined the Faroese champions KÍ Klaksvík for half a season.

Following an unsuccessful return to HamKam, Jarosiński became the goalkeeping coach for Vålerenga's youth teams on 30 December 2021.

After being promoted to the first team staff in July 2024, he joined Vålerenga's roster in October 2024 following Jacob Storevik's departure on loan to Viking.

== Career statistics ==
As of match played 19 October 2024

Appearances and goals by club, season and competition
| Club | Season | League | | | National cup (Note: Includes Polish Cup, Norwegian Cup) | | Europe | | Total | |
| Club | Season | Division | Apps | Goals | Apps | Goals | Apps | Goals | Apps | Goals |
|---|---|---|---|---|---|---|---|---|---|---|
| Wisła Kraków | 2006–07 | Ekstraklasa | 1 | 0 | 0 | 0 | 0 | 0 | 1 | 0 |
| Wisła Kraków | 2007–08 | Ekstraklasa | 0 | 0 | 0 | 0 | — | | 0 | 0 |
| Wisła Kraków | 2009–10 | Ekstraklasa | 0 | 0 | 0 | 0 | 0 | 0 | 0 | 0 |
| Wisła Kraków | Total | | 1 | 0 | 0 | 0 | 0 | 0 | 0 | 0 |
| Polonia Świdnica (loan) | 2008–09 | III liga | 16 | 0 | — | | — | | 16 | 0 |
| Górnik Polkowice (loan) | 2010–11 | I liga | 0 | 0 | 0 | 0 | — | | 0 | 0 |
| MKS Kluczbork (loan) | 2011–12 | II liga | 1 | 0 | 1 | 0 | — | | 2 | 0 |
| Alta IF | 2012 | 1. divisjon | 20 | 0 | 3 | 0 | — | | 23 | 0 |
| Alta IF | 2013 | 2. divisjon | 25 | 0 | 2 | 0 | — | | 27 | 0 |
| Alta IF | Total | | 45 | 0 | 5 | 0 | — | | 50 | 0 |
| Hønefoss BK | 2014 | 1. divisjon | 20 | 0 | 1 | 0 | — | | 21 | 0 |
| Hønefoss BK | 2015 | 1. divisjon | 16 | 0 | 0 | 0 | — | | 16 | 0 |
| Hønefoss BK | Total | | 36 | 0 | 1 | 0 | — | | 37 | 0 |
| Strømsgodset | 2015 | Eliteserien | 0 | 0 | 0 | 0 | 0 | 0 | 0 | 0 |
| Strømsgodset | 2016 | Eliteserien | 0 | 0 | 3 | 0 | 0 | 0 | 3 | 0 |
| Strømsgodset | Total | | 0 | 0 | 3 | 0 | 0 | 0 | 3 | 0 |
| HamKam | 2017 | 2. divisjon | 25 | 0 | 0 | 0 | — | | 25 | 0 |
| HamKam | 2018 | 1. divisjon | 29 | 0 | 0 | 0 | — | | 29 | 0 |
| HamKam | 2019 | 1. divisjon | 28 | 0 | 1 | 0 | — | | 29 | 0 |
| HamKam | Total | | 82 | 0 | 1 | 0 | — | | 83 | 0 |
| KÍ Klaksvík | 2020 | Betri deildin | 7 | 0 | 0 | 0 | 0 | 0 | 7 | 0 |
| HamKam | 2021 | 1. divisjon | 0 | 0 | 0 | 0 | — | | 0 | 0 |
| Vålerenga 2 | 2022 | 2. divisjon | 0 | 0 | — | | — | | 0 | 0 |
| Vålerenga 2 | 2023 | 2. divisjon | 0 | 0 | — | | — | | 0 | 0 |
| Vålerenga 2 | 2024 | 2. divisjon | 1 | 0 | — | | — | | 1 | 0 |
| Vålerenga 2 | Total | | 1 | 0 | — | | — | | 1 | 0 |
| Vålerenga | 2024 | 1. divisjon | 0 | 0 | — | | — | | 0 | 0 |
| Career total | | | 189 | 0 | 11 | 0 | 0 | 0 | 200 | 0 |
