= Radosław Janukiewicz =

Polish footballer

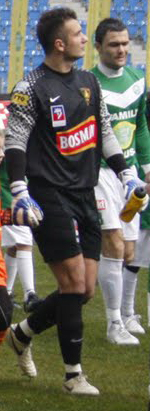

Personal information
- Date of birth: 5 May 1984 (age 42)
- Place of birth: Wrocław, Poland
- Height: 1.93 m (6 ft 4 in)
- Position: Goalkeeper

Team information
- Current team: Rega Trzebiatów; Futsal Szczecin
- Number: 84

Senior career*
Years	Team	Apps	(Gls)
2001–2007	Śląsk Wrocław	106	(0)
2008	→ Zagłębie Lubin (loan)	2	(0)
2008	Skoda Xanthi	0	(0)
2009	GKP Gorzów Wielkopolski	7	(0)
2009–2017	Pogoń Szczecin	164	(0)
2015–2016	→ Górnik Zabrze (loan)	12	(0)
2017	→ Strømsgodset (loan)	5	(0)
2017–2020	Chojniczanka Chojnice	92	(0)
2020–2022	Pomorzanin Nowogard	44	(0)
2021–	Futsal Szczecin	63	(1)
2022–	Rega Trzebiatów	40	(0)
- * Club domestic league appearances and goals as of 4 May 2024

Radosław Janukiewicz (Polish pronunciation: [ra.ˈdɔs.waf ˌja.nu.ˈkʲɛ.vit͡ʂ]; born 5 May 1984) is a Polish footballer who plays as a goalkeeper for Rega Trzebiatów. He also plays futsal for Futsal Szczecin.

== Club career ==
On 13 February 2008 Śląsk Wrocław announced that the player had signed a four-year contract with Skoda Xanthi transferring him to the Greek club at the end of the season and that he would spend the remainder of 2007–08 on loan at Zagłębie Lubin. However, the contract with Skoda was terminated before the start of the new season. On 28 February 2009 he joined GKP Gorzów Wielkopolski, signing a half-year contract.

On 31 March 2017, Janukiewicz signed for Norwegian side Strømsgodset on loan.

On 26 August 2020, he joined Pomorzanin Nowogard.

== International career ==
Janukiewicz was called up to the Poland national football team on one occasion in 2014 for a friendly against Germany, but remained on the bench.
