= Marcus Pedersen =

Norwegian footballer (born 1990)

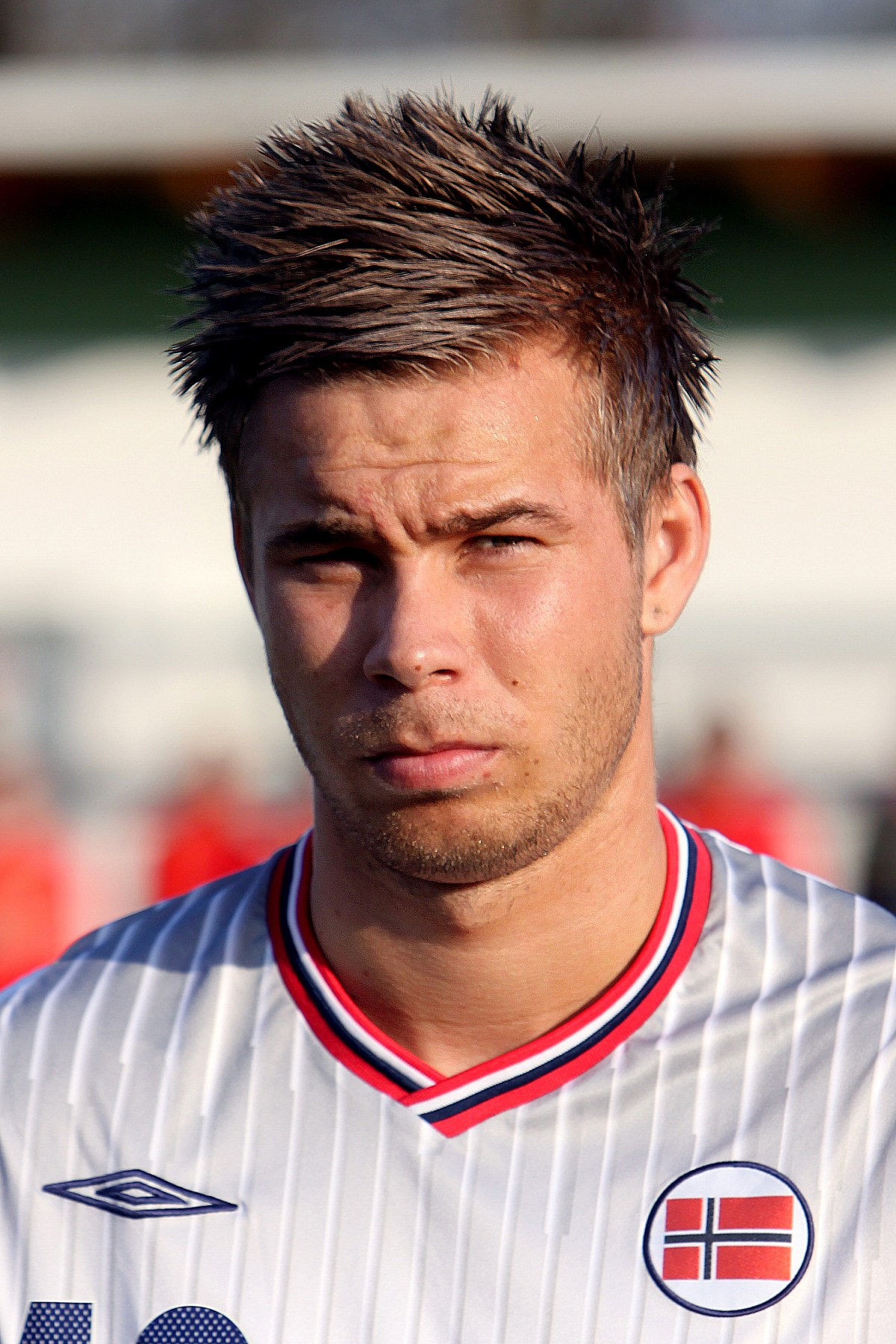
- Pedersen with Norway U-21 in 2011

Personal information
- Date of birth: 8 June 1990 (age 36)
- Place of birth: Hamar, Norway
- Height: 1.80 m (5 ft 11 in)
- Position: Forward

Team information
- Current team: Løten

Youth career
- –2001: Stange
- 2001–2007: HamKam

Senior career*
Years	Team	Apps	(Gls)
2007–2008	HamKam	9	(1)
2009–2010	Strømsgodset	40	(17)
2010–2014	Vitesse	27	(6)
2012	→ Vålerenga (loan)	15	(8)
2012–2013	→ OB (loan)	24	(7)
2013–2014	→ Barnsley (loan)	18	(2)
2014–2015	Brann	19	(6)
2015–2019	Strømsgodset	82	(43)
2020	HamKam	21	(11)
2021	Ankaraspor	13	(8)
2021	Tuzlaspor	8	(0)
2022–2023	HamKam	10	(0)
2023–	Løten	13	(9)

International career
2005	Norway U15	7	(0)
2006	Norway U16	10	(7)
2007	Norway U17	7	(4)
2009	Norway U19	2	(3)
2009–2013	Norway U21	19	(7)
2011–2014	Norway U23	3	(1)
2013–2015	Norway	9	(1)
- * Club domestic league appearances and goals as of 17:05, 2 October 2023 (UTC)

Marcus Pedersen (born 8 June 1990) is a Norwegian footballer who plays as a forward for Norwegian Fourth Division club Løten.

== Club career ==
=== HamKam ===
Pedersen was born in Hamar, Norway. He grew up in the nearby Stange Municipality, where he played youth football until he joined HamKam at age 11.

He played in his first senior match for HamKam at the age of 14, in a friendly game. In the spring of 2006, he was invited to a trial with Liverpool, but failed to impress, which Pedersen later attributed to an attack of mononucleosis that was identified after he returned home.

In 2007, he was part of the HamKam squad that was promoted to Tippeligaen. He made his debut for HamKam against Skeid on 9 April 2007 and featured in three other matches that season. He made his Tippeliga debut, and scored his first professional goal in the 2–1 victory against Rosenborg on 9 July 2008, making him the match winner. Injuries prevented him from getting more than five games in his second senior season.

=== Strømsgodset ===
On 1 January 2009 Pedersen signed for Strømsgodset on a free transfer, after his contract with HamKam ended. He cited the need for a change in surroundings as part of why he signed for a new club. He played his first match in Tippeligaen for Strømsgodset on 15 March 2009 against Start. The match ended 3–3 with Pedersen scoring two of the goals. He scored another two goals on 2 June 2009 in a 2–1 victory against Brann. Altogether, he scored 10 goals in 24 matches in the 2009 season, making him the top goal scorer for his club that year.

The 2010 season started very well for Pedersen. Playing alongside another young talent, Jo Inge Berget helped Pedersen to score seven goals in 16 matches in 2010, and was second on the top-scorer list in Tippeligaen. He suffered an injury during a game a few weeks before the transfer-windows closed, and a transfer seemed unlikely, until Vitesse showed concrete interest in him.

=== Vitesse ===
On 30 August 2010, he was sold from Strømsgodset to Vitesse Arnhem for about 12 million NOK, and signed a 4-year contract with the club. Only six weeks later, Vitesse manager Theo Bos was sacked, and was replaced by Albert Ferrer. Pedersen made his debut for the club on 24 October 2010, in the 4–1 defeat against Utrect. He scored his first goal only two minutes after coming on as a substitute. In the next match, on 14 November 2010, he scored two goals for Vitesse in a 5–1 victory over Venlo. He played a total of 16 league matches and scored five goals for the club in his first season, but featured only five times in the starting lineup. Vitesse barely avoided relegation in the 2010–11 Eredivisie and manager Albert Ferrer was replaced by John van den Brom. The new manager did not give Pedersen many chances in the 2011–12 Eredivisie. While Vitesse secured a UEFA Europa League, Pedersen only played four matches from the start and came on as a substitute five times. He failed to score any goals.

=== Vålerenga ===
Having struggled with various injuries, Pedersen found it difficult to hold down a spot in Vitesse's starting eleven. He was subsequently sent on loan to Norwegian club Vålerenga on 22 February 2012, and managed 8 goals in 15 league appearances until the loan-deal ended on 1 August. On 21 August 2012, he was fined by the Football Association of Norway for making homophobic remarks towards Stabæk supporters 22 July 2012.

=== Odense ===
On 31 August 2012, Pedersen was loaned out to Odense Boldklub on a season-long loan deal, with OB having an option to buy. He made his debut against F.C. Copenhagen on 2 September 2012.

=== Barnsley ===
On 21 August 2013, Pedersen joined English Championship club Barnsley on a season-long loan.

=== Brann ===
On 11 August 2014, Pedersen was sold to Brann for an undisclosed sum, partly financed by investor Trond Mohn. He scored three goals in ten league matches for the club, but was unable to save them from relegation.

Pedersen had a gentleman's agreement with the former sports director of Brann, Roald Bruun-Hansen, that he would be sold if the club was relegated. However, the interim director Rune Soltvedt informed the striker that he was to be part of the club's plans to win promotion the next season. During pre-season, on 4 February 2015, Pedersen tore his posterior cruciate ligament, and was injured for over three months, not playing again until 26 May 2015. He then went on to score three goals in his final eight league matches for the club.

=== Strømsgodset ===
On 13 August 2015, Brann sold Pedersen to Strømsgodset for 2 million NOK. He made his comeback debut for the club in the 2–1 away defeat against Aalesund on 14 August 2015. He scored a hat-trick against local rivals Mjøndalen IF in a 4–2 away win on 30 August 2015.

He finished his first season having scored 11 goals in ten matches, helping his team secure the runner-up position in the 2015 Tippeligaen.

=== Later career ===
On 3 June 2020, Pedersen returned to former club HamKam. After a spell in Turkish clubs Ankaraspor and Tuzlaspor, Pedersen returned again to former club HamKam on 11 August 2022.

In February 2023, Pedersen joined Norwegian Fourth Division club Løten, effectively ending his professional career.

== International career ==
Pedersen represented Norway at youth level from U15 to U23. He played his first match for the U21 side in August 2009, and he scored two goals for Norway U21 in the match against Hungary U21 on 28 May 2010.

Pedersen made his debut for Norway in the friendly match against South Africa on 8 January 2013, and started the match against Zambia four days later.

He returned to the national team on 12 November 2015, coming on as a substitute in the 61st minute in Norway's 1–0 defeat to Hungary in the first leg of the UEFA Euro 2016 qualifying play-offs.

== Career statistics ==
=== Club ===
As of match played 19 September 2023

Appearances and goals by club, season and competition
Club	Season	League			National cup (Note: Includes Norwegian Football Cup, KNVB Cup, Danish Cup, FA Cup)		League cup (Note: Includes Football League/EFL Cup)		Europe		Total	
Club	Season	Division	Apps	Goals	Apps	Goals	Apps	Goals	Apps	Goals	Apps	Goals
Ham-Kam	2007	Adeccoligaen	4	0	0	0	—		—		4	0
Ham-Kam	2008	Tippeligaen	5	1	1	0	—		—		6	1
Ham-Kam	Total		9	1	1	0	—		—		10	1
Strømsgodset	2009	Tippeligaen	24	10	0	0	—		—		24	10
Strømsgodset	2010	Tippeligaen	16	7	3	4	—		—		19	11
Strømsgodset	Total		40	17	3	4	—		—		43	21
Vitesse	2010–11	Eredivisie	16	5	1	0	—		—		17	5
Vitesse	2011–12	Eredivisie	9	0	2	1	—		—		11	1
Vitesse	2012–13	Eredivisie	0	0	0	0	—		—		0	0
Vitesse	2013–14	Eredivisie	2	1	0	0	—		1 (Note: Appearances in UEFA Europa League)	0	3	1
Vitesse	Total		27	6	3	1	—		1	0	30	7
Vålerenga (loan)	2012	Tippeligaen	15	8	1	1	—		—		16	9
OB (loan)	2012–13	Superliga	24	7	3	4	—		—		27	11
Barnsley (loan)	2013–14	Championship	18	2	1	0	1	0	—		20	2
Brann	2014	Tippeligaen	12	3	1	0	—		—		13	3
Brann	2015	OBOS-ligaen	9	3	1	1	—		—		10	4
Brann	Total		21	6	2	1	—		—		23	7
Strømsgodset	2015	Tippeligaen	10	11	0	0	—		—		10	11
Strømsgodset	2016	Tippeligaen	19	8	3	3	—		2	1	22	11
Strømsgodset	2017	Eliteserien	26	9	3	1	—		—		29	10
Strømsgodset	2018	Eliteserien	23	14	2	0	—		—		25	14
Strømsgodset	2019	Eliteserien	4	1	0	0	—		—		4	1
Strømsgodset	Total		82	43	8	4	—		2	1	92	48
Ham-Kam	2020	OBOS-ligaen	21	11	0	0	—		—		21	11
Ankaraspor	2020–21	TFF First League	13	8	0	0	—		—		13	8
Tuzlaspor	2021–22	TFF First League	8	0	0	0	—		—		8	0
Ham-Kam	2022	Eliteserien	10	0	1	0	—		—		10	0
Løten	2023	4. divisjon	13	9	1	1	—		—		14	10
Career total			301	118	24	16	1	0	3	1	329	135

=== International goals ===
Scores and results list Norway's goal tally first, score column indicates the score after each Pedersen goal.

List of international goals scored by Marcus Pedersen
No.	Date	Venue	Opponent	Score	Result	Competition
1	15 November 2013	MCH Arena, Herning, Denmark	Denmark	1–1	1-2	Friendly
