= Mathias Gjerstrøm =

Norwegian footballer (born 1997)

Personal information
- Full name: Mathias Berg Gjerstrøm
- Date of birth: 30 June 1997 (age 29)
- Place of birth: Oslo, Norway
- Height: 1.82 m (5 ft 11 1/2 in)
- Position: Midfielder

Team information
- Current team: Kongsvinger
- Number: 17

Youth career
- –2013: Nordstrand
- 2013–2014: Strømsgodset

Senior career*
Years	Team	Apps	(Gls)
2014–2020	Strømsgodset	15	(0)
2016	→ Kongsvinger (loan)	12	(0)
2018	→ Notodden (loan)	10	(0)
2019	→ Kongsvinger (loan)	19	(1)
2020–	Kongsvinger	125	(2)

International career
2012	Norway U15	7	(0)
2013	Norway U16	11	(1)
2014	Norway U17	12	(1)
2014–2015	Norway U18	11	(0)
2016	Norway U19	3	(0)
- * Club domestic league appearances and goals as of 14 November 2026

Mathias Berg Gjerstrøm (born 30 June 1997) is a Norwegian footballer who plays for Kongsvinger as a midfielder.

== Career ==
Gjerstrøm spent his youth years at Nordstrand IF, and is considered one of the most talented young players in the country, having played for Norway's youth international teams since he was 14. In February 2013, he spent four days training with Manchester United.

Gjerstrøm was also a talented handball-player for Bækkelagets SK, with international matches for the Norwegian G-15 team, but decided to focus on football.

On 11 August 2013, Gjerstrøm signed for Norwegian Premier League champions Strømsgodset for an undisclosed sum.

Gjerstrøm made his debut for Strømsgodset in the 1-4 home loss against Brann on 13 September 2014.

On 31 March 2016 he was loaned to Kongsvinger. On 15 August 2018, Gjerstrøm was loaned out once again, this time to Notodden FK for the rest of the year.

== Career statistics ==
=== Club ===
As of match played 6 November 2021

Appearances and goals by club, season and competition
Club	Season	League			National Cup		Europe		Total	
Club	Season	Division	Apps	Goals	Apps	Goals	Apps	Goals	Apps	Goals
Strømsgodset	2014	Tippeligaen	1	0	0	0	-		1	0
Strømsgodset	2015	Tippeligaen	1	0	0	0	-		1	0
Strømsgodset	2016	Tippeligaen	6	0	0	0	-		6	0
Strømsgodset	2017	Eliteserien	6	0	1	0	-		7	0
Strømsgodset	2018	Eliteserien	1	0	0	0	-		1	0
Strømsgodset	Total		15	0	1	0	-	-	16	0
Kongsvinger (loan)	2016	OBOS-ligaen	12	0	4	0	-		16	0
Kongsvinger (loan)	2019	OBOS-ligaen	19	1	3	0	-		22	1
Kongsvinger (loan)	Total		31	1	7	0	-	-	38	1
Notodden (loan)	2018	OBOS-ligaen	10	0	0	0	-		10	0
Notodden (loan)	Total		10	0	0	0	-	-	10	0
Kongsvinger	2020	OBOS-ligaen	16	1	0	0	-		16	1
Kongsvinger	2021	PostNord-ligaen	18	1	3	0	-		21	1
Kongsvinger	Total		34	2	3	0	-	-	37	2
Career total			89	3	11	0	-	-	100	3
