= Kim André Madsen =

Norwegian footballer (born 1989)

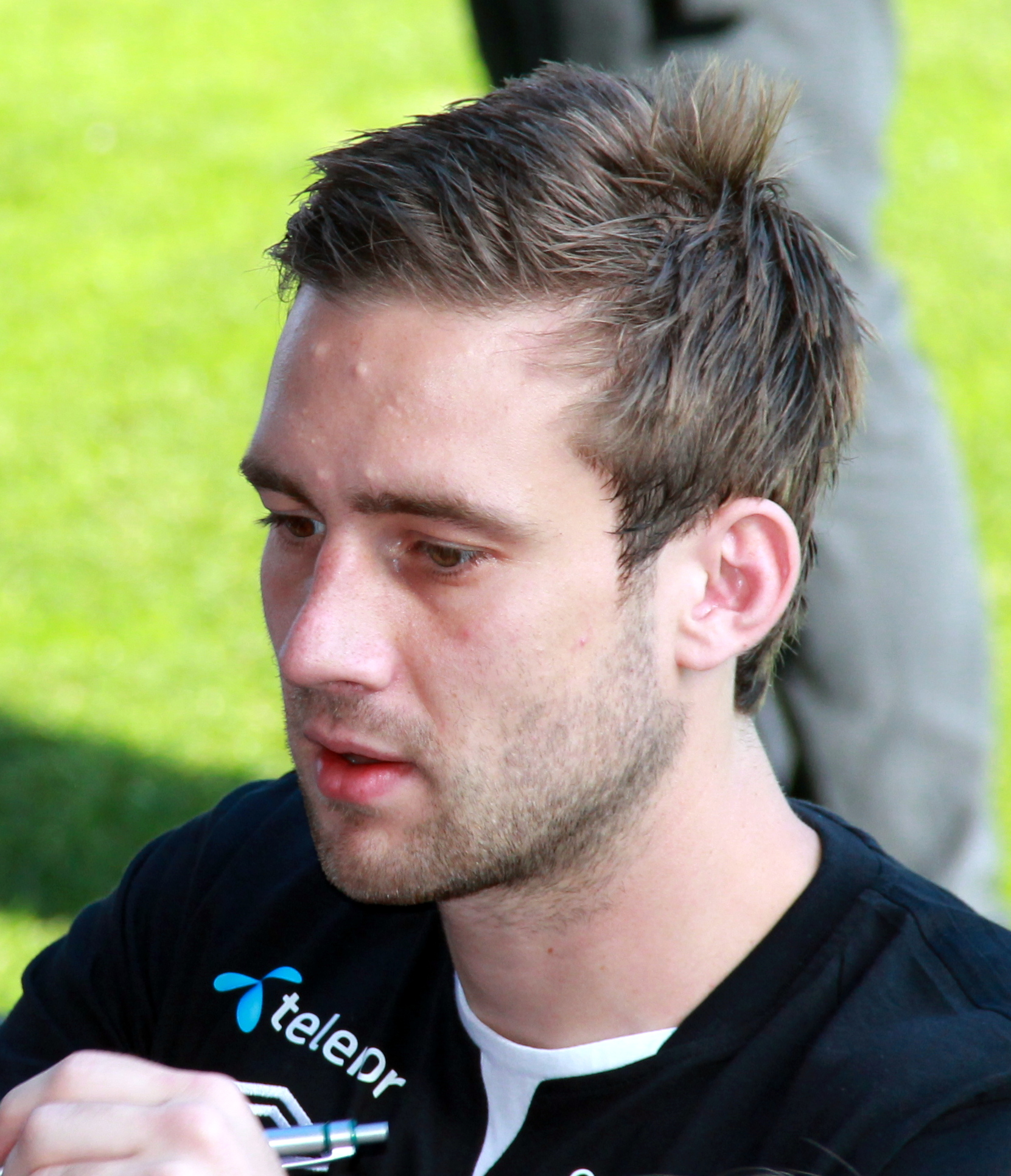
- Madsen in 2013

Personal information
- Full name: Kim André Madsen
- Date of birth: 12 March 1989 (age 37)
- Place of birth: Oslo, Norway
- Height: 1.84 m (6 ft 0 in)
- Position: Defender

Team information
- Current team: Asker
- Number: 6

Youth career
- 2000–2001: Vestli
- 2002–2003: Grei
- 2004–2006: Lyn

Senior career*
Years	Team	Apps	(Gls)
2006–2008	Lyn	16	(0)
2008	→ Nybergsund (loan)	8	(0)
2009–2018	Strømsgodset	140	(0)
2019–	Asker	38	(2)

International career^{‡}
2005	Norway U16	9	(0)
2006	Norway U17	5	(0)
2006	Norway U18	6	(0)
2007	Norway U19	5	(0)
2008–2011	Norway U21	2	(0)
2011–	Norway	5	(0)
- * Club domestic league appearances and goals as of 3 October 2020 ‡ National team caps and goals as of 12 June 2013

Kim André Madsen (born 12 March 1989) is a Norwegian footballer who currently plays for Asker. He is also the assistant coach. He came for FC Lyn Oslo before the 2009 season, and has also been on loan at Nybergsund IL.

He spent ten seasons with Strømsgodset, winning the league in 2013 and the cup in 2010. Due to frequent injuries, he played fewer games in the final seasons, before leaving after the 2018 season.

== Career statistics ==
As of 3 October 2020

Club	Season	Division	League		Cup		Europe		Total	
Club	Season	Division	Apps	Goals	Apps	Goals	Apps	Goals	Apps	Goals
Lyn	2006	Tippeligaen	4	0	1	0	1	0	6	0
Lyn	2007	Tippeligaen	11	0	4	0	—		15	0
Lyn	2008	Tippeligaen	1	0	0	0	—		1	0
Lyn	Total		16	0	5	2	1	0	22	2
Nybergsund	2008	1. divisjon	8	0	0	0	—		8	0
Strømsgodset	2009	Tippeligaen	15	0	1	0	—		16	0
Strømsgodset	2010	Tippeligaen	11	0	0	0	—		11	0
Strømsgodset	2011	Tippeligaen	18	0	3	1	2	0	23	1
Strømsgodset	2012	Tippeligaen	27	0	3	0	—		30	0
Strømsgodset	2013	Tippeligaen	26	0	2	0	3	0	31	0
Strømsgodset	2014	Tippeligaen	7	0	2	0	0	0	9	0
Strømsgodset	2015	Tippeligaen	7	0	0	0	4	0	11	0
Strømsgodset	2016	Tippeligaen	18	0	2	0	2	0	22	0
Strømsgodset	2017	Eliteserien	11	0	3	0	—		14	0
Strømsgodset	2018	Eliteserien	2	0	1	0	—		3	0
Strømsgodset	Total		142	0	17	1	12	0	171	1
Asker	2019	PostNord-ligaen	25	0	1	0	—		26	0
Asker	2020	PostNord-ligaen	13	2	0	0	—		13	2
Asker	Total		38	2	1	0	—		39	2
Career total			204	2	23	1	12	0	239	3

== Honours ==
=== Club ===
Strømsgodset

- Tippeligaen: 2013
