= Anders Gundersen =

Norwegian footballer (born 1994)

Personal information
- Full name: Anders Gundersen
- Date of birth: 10 April 1994 (age 32)
- Place of birth: Porsgrunn, Norway
- Height: 1.85 m (6 ft 1 in)
- Position: Goalkeeper

Team information
- Current team: Skeid
- Number: 12

Youth career
- Stathelle
- Brevik
- Pors

Senior career*
Years	Team	Apps	(Gls)
2011–2013	Pors		
2013–2015	Strømsgodset	4	(0)
2015–2016	→ Sandefjord (loan)	13	(0)
2017	Arendal	16	(0)
2018–2020	Moss	51	(0)
2021–	Skeid	5	(0)

International career^{‡}
2013	Norway U19		
Medal record
Gold medal – first place	Tippeligaen	2013
- * Club domestic league appearances and goals as of 8 March 2022 ‡ National team caps and goals as of 30 July 2014

Anders Gundersen (born 10 April 1994) is a Norwegian professional footballer who plays as a goalkeeper for Skeid.

== Playing career ==
=== Club ===
Anders Gundersen was born in Porsgrunn, but grew up in Stathelle and started his senior career with Pors Grenland in the 2. divisjon. He signed for Strømsgodset in the summer transfer window of 2013, after impressing in a match against Strømsgodset 2.

Gundersen was part of the 2013 Tippeliga winning squad, but did not play any matches. He got his first team debut for Strømsgodset on 19 May 2014 in the 1–2 loss to Stabæk. He also played the next two matches for Strømsgodset, when first choice goalkeeper Adam Larsen Kwarasey was participating in the 2014 FIFA World Cup.

On 21 July 2015, Gundersen went on loan to Sandefjord for the remainder of the season. In December 2015, the loan was extended to the end of the 2016-season.

=== International ===
Gundersen was called up to the Norway U-19 team in 2013.

== Career statistics ==
As of 3 May 2017

Club	Season	League			Cup		Total	
Club	Season	Division	Apps	Goals	Apps	Goals	Apps	Goals
Pors Grenland	2011	2. divisjon	?	?	?	?	?	?
Pors Grenland	2012	2. divisjon	22	0	1	0	23	0
Pors Grenland	2013	2. divisjon	13	0	0	0	13	0
Pors Grenland	Total		35	0	1	0	36	0
Strømsgodset	2013	Tippeligaen	0	0	0	0	0	0
Strømsgodset	2014	Tippeligaen	4	0	2	0	6	0
Strømsgodset	2015	Tippeligaen	0	0	0	0	0	0
Strømsgodset	Total		4	0	2	0	6	0
Sandefjord	2015	Tippeligaen	7	0	1	0	8	0
Sandefjord	2016	OBOS-ligaen	7	0	5	0	12	0
Sandefjord	Total		14	0	6	0	20	0
Arendal	2017	OBOS-ligaen	16	0	0	0	16	0
Arendal	Total		16	0	0	0	16	0
Career total			58	0	9	0	67	0

== Honours ==
=== Club ===
Strømsgodset

- Tippeligaen champion: 2013
