= Martin Rønning Ovenstad =

Norwegian footballer (born 1994)

Personal information
- Full name: Martin Rønning Ovenstad
- Date of birth: 18 April 1994 (age 32)
- Place of birth: Drammen, Norway
- Height: 1.82 m (5 ft 11 1/2 in)
- Position: Midfielder

Youth career
- 2012: Strømsgodset

Senior career*
Years	Team	Apps	(Gls)
2010–2011	Mjøndalen	36	(2)
2012–2016	Strømsgodset	73	(2)
2017–2018	Sturm Graz	4	(0)
2018	→ Stabæk (loan)	7	(0)
2018–2019	Strømsgodset	15	(1)
2020–2024	Mjøndalen	132	(14)

International career
2009	Norway U15	2	(1)
2010	Norway U16	10	(4)
2011	Norway U17	9	(5)
2011–2012	Norway U18	11	(2)
2013	Norway U19	8	(1)
2013	Norway U23	1	(0)
2014–2015	Norway U21	9	(0)
- * Club domestic league appearances and goals as of 14 November 2024

Martin Rønning Ovenstad (born 18 April 1994) is a former Norwegian footballer.

Rønning Ovenstad made his debut for Mjøndalen in the 1–3 loss against Moss on 25 April 2010, just one week after his 16th birthday.

Two years later, he signed for Strømsgodset, and made his debut in the 4–0 win against Hønefoss on 30 June 2012. He was part of the 2013 Tippeligaen title winning squad, playing 13 league matches.

In July 2014, he was diagnosed with mononucleosis and was expected to miss the rest of the 2014 season. However, he made a quick recovery, and came on as a substitute in the 25th round 2–1 win against Viking, on 28 September the same year.

In 2018 he spent time on loan at Stabæk, without making a mark. Shortly after his loan return his contract was terminated, so he decided to return to Strømsgodset on a three-month contract. The contract was later lengthened until the end of the 2019 season, after which he was released.

== Career statistics ==
As of 4 July 2025

Club	Season	Division	League		Cup		Europe		Total	
Club	Season	Division	Apps	Goals	Apps	Goals	Apps	Goals	Apps	Goals
Mjøndalen	2010	Adeccoligaen	7	0	2	0	—		9	0
Mjøndalen	2011	Adeccoligaen	29	2	3	0	—		32	2
Mjøndalen	Total		36	2	5	0	0	0	41	2
Strømsgodset	2012	Tippeligaen	3	0	1	0	—		4	0
Strømsgodset	2013	Tippeligaen	13	1	2	0	2	0	17	1
Strømsgodset	2014	Tippeligaen	13	0	2	1	0	0	15	1
Strømsgodset	2015	Tippeligaen	27	0	1	0	3	0	31	0
Strømsgodset	2016	Tippeligaen	17	1	3	1	0	0	20	2
Strømsgodset	Total		73	2	9	2	5	0	87	4
Sturm Graz	2016–17	Bundesliga	4	0	0	0	—		4	0
Sturm Graz	2017–18	Bundesliga	0	0	1	0	—		1	0
Sturm Graz	Total		4	0	1	0	0	0	5	0
Stabæk	2018	Eliteserien	7	0	2	0	—		9	0
Stabæk	Total		7	0	2	0	0	0	9	0
Strømsgodset	2018	Eliteserien	5	0	2	0	—		7	0
Strømsgodset	2019	Eliteserien	10	1	3	2	—		13	3
Strømsgodset	Total		15	1	5	2	0	0	20	3
Mjøndalen	2020	Eliteserien	24	1	0	0	—		24	1
Mjøndalen	2021	Eliteserien	29	3	1	0	—		30	3
Mjøndalen	2022	OBOS-ligaen	28	8	2	3	—		30	11
Mjøndalen	2023	OBOS-ligaen	30	3	3	1	—		33	4
Mjøndalen	2024	OBOS-ligaen	21	0	2	0	—		23	0
Mjøndalen	Total		132	15	8	4	0	0	140	19
Career total			267	20	30	8	5	0	302	28

== Honours ==
=== Club ===
- Strømsgodset:
  - Tippeligaen: 2013
