= Espen Bugge Pettersen =

Norwegian footballer (born 1980)

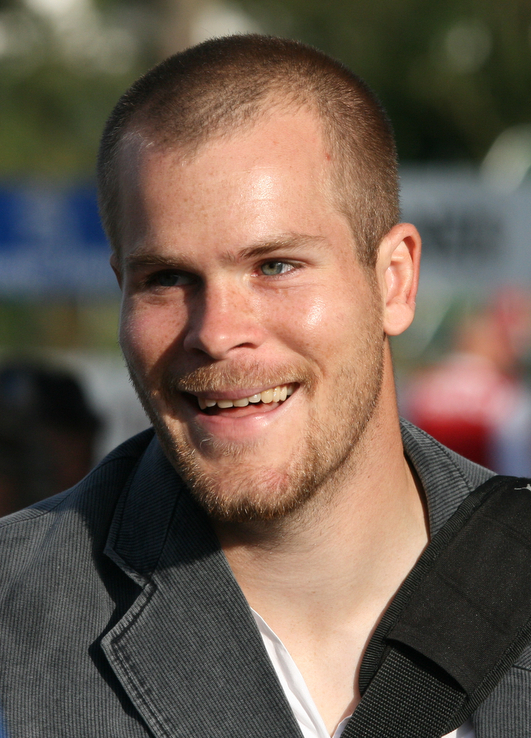
- Bugge Pettersen in 2008

Personal information
- Date of birth: 10 May 1980 (age 46)
- Place of birth: Tønsberg, Norway
- Height: 1.89 m (6 ft 2 1/2 in)
- Position: Goalkeeper

Youth career
- –1999: Tønsberg FK

Senior career*
Years	Team	Apps	(Gls)
1999–2001	Eik-Tønsberg	28	(0)
2002–2010	Sandefjord	240	(0)
2010–2014	Molde	68	(0)
2015–2018	Strømsgodset	106	(0)

International career
2009–2011	Norway	7	(0)

Managerial career
- 2019–2025: Sandefjord (managing director)
- 2025–: Odd (managing director)
Medal record
Molde
Winner	Tippeligaen	2011
Winner	Tippeligaen	2012
Winner	Tippeligaen	2014
- * Club domestic league appearances and goals

Espen Bugge Pettersen (born 10 May 1980) is a Norwegian former footballer who played as a goalkeeper. He was capped seven times for the Norway national team. Bugge Pettersen is currently managing director at Odd.

== Club career ==
=== Early career ===
Bugge Pettersen started his career in the local clubs Tønsberg FK and Eik-Tønsberg, and moved to Sandefjord Fotball before the 2002season. In the nine seasons he played in Sandefjord, he played 240 of 250 possible league matches.

=== Molde ===
On 31 July 2010, it was announced that Bugge Pettersen was sold from Sandefjord to Molde FK, signing a 3 1/2-year contract. In his second season in Molde, he won the league championship with Ole Gunnar Solskjær as manager, and won the Kniksen award as the best goalkeeper in Tippeligaen. Bugge Pettersen played 123 consecutive first-team matches for Sandefjord and Molde, from he missed the Tippeliga-match against Start on 1 October 2007, until Solskjær decided to let the second-choice goalkeeper, Elias Valderhaug, play the last two league-games after Molde won Tippeligaen in 2011.

=== Strømsgodset ===
On 12 December 2014, Bugge Pettersen signed a two-year contract with Strømsgodset.

== International career ==
He made his international debut on 29 May 2010 against Montenegro, when he replaced Rune Jarstein as a substitute in the 89th minute. The last couple of years, Bugge Pettersen have been Norway's second-choice goalkeeper, with Rune Jarstein being the first choice. As of November 2012 he has been capped seven times, and he started his first international game in a friendly matches against Thailand on 18 January 2012.

== Career statistics ==
Club	Season	Division	League		Cup		Europe		Total	
Club	Season	Division	Apps	Goals	Apps	Goals	Apps	Goals	Apps	Goals
Sandefjord	2002	1. divisjon	30	0	1	0	-		31	0
Sandefjord	2003	1. divisjon	30	0	2	0	-		32	0
Sandefjord	2004	1. divisjon	29	0	4	0	-		33	0
Sandefjord	2005	1. divisjon	25	0	0	0	-		25	0
Sandefjord	2006	Tippeligaen	26	0	5	0	-		31	0
Sandefjord	2007	Tippeligaen	22	0	2	0	-		24	0
Sandefjord	2008	1. divisjon	30	0	0	0	-		30	0
Sandefjord	2009	Tippeligaen	30	0	2	0	-		32	0
Sandefjord	2010	Tippeligaen	18	0	0	0	-		18	0
Sandefjord	Total		240	0	16	0	-		256	0
Molde	2010	Tippeligaen	12	0	0	0	1	0	13	0
Molde	2011	Tippeligaen	28	0	1	0	-		29	0
Molde	2012	Tippeligaen	23	0	1	0	5	0	29	0
Molde	2013	Tippeligaen	2	0	0	0	0	0	2	0
Molde	2014	Tippeligaen	3	0	0	0	0	0	3	0
Molde	Total		68	0	2	0	6	0	76	0
Strømsgodset	2015	Tippeligaen	30	0	3	0	6	0	39	0
Strømsgodset	2016	Tippeligaen	30	0	3	0	2	0	35	0
Strømsgodset	2017	Eliteserien	24	0	1	0	0	0	25	0
Strømsgodset	2018	Eliteserien	22	0	3	0	0	0	25	0
Strømsgodset	Total		106	0	10	0	8	0	124	0
Career total			413	0	27	0	14	0	454	0

== Honours ==
Molde

- Tippeligaen: 2011, 2012, 2014

Individual

- Kniksen Goalkeeper of the Year: 2011
