= Mounir Hamoud =

Norwegian footballer (1985–2024)

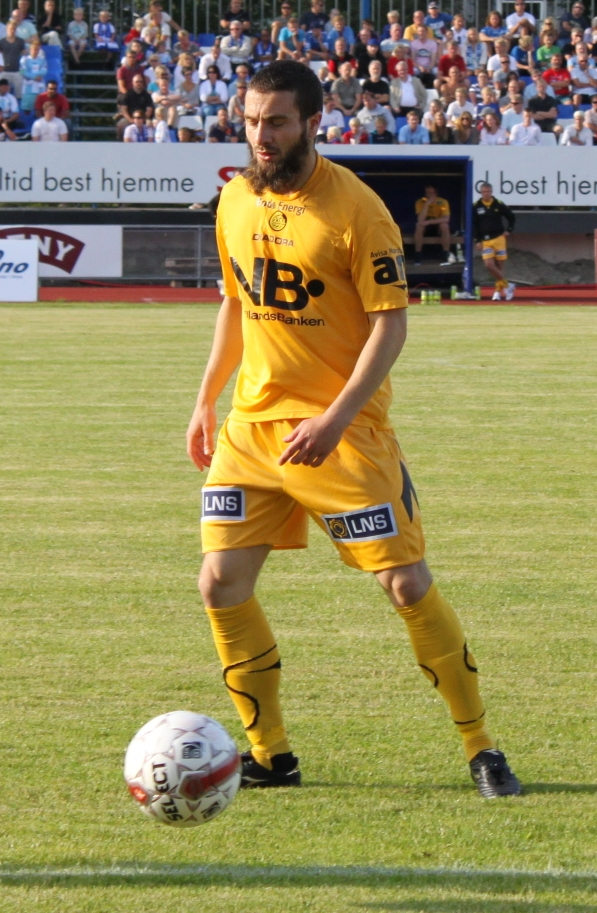
- Hamoud with Bodø/Glimt in 2010

Personal information
- Date of birth: 1 February 1985
- Place of birth: Nador, Morocco
- Date of death: 12 February 2024 (aged 39)
- Place of death: Drammen, Norway
- Height: 1.77 m (5 ft 10 in)
- Position: Defender

Youth career
- –2003: Lyn

Senior career*
Years	Team	Apps	(Gls)
2004–2005	Lyn	36	(1)
2006–2011	Bodø/Glimt	160	(15)
2012–2019	Strømsgodset	112	(5)
Total		308	(21)

International career
2003	Norway U18	2	(0)
2004	Norway U19	6	(0)
2004–2005	Norway U21	7	(0)
- * Club domestic league appearances and goals

Mounir Hamoud (Arabic: منير حمود; 1 February 1985 – 12 February 2024) was a professional footballer. He was a versatile player who could play both in defence or midfield, most often as a right-back.

== Career ==
In 2004 and 2005 Hamoud played in the Norwegian top division for FC Lyn Oslo. Born in Morocco, he was capped by Norway at the U18, U19, and U21 levels. In 2006, he joined Bodø/Glimt where he spent six seasons.

Hamoud was called up to the Norway senior national team on 27 January 2009, as a part of caretaker coach Egil Olsen's squad against Germany, but remained on the bench as an unused substitute.

Hamoud signed for Strømsgodset prior to the 2012 season. With 54 league matches, he became an important part of the team that won the 2013 Tippeligaen, and secured 2nd and 4th place in 2012 and 2014, respectively. When his contract expired after the 2014 season, he was released from the club. On 15 January 2015, he signed a new three-year deal with the club. After the 2019 season, he retired from football.

== Later life and death ==
Hamoud resided in Skoger, was a children's coach in Skoger IL and played briefly for the men's team on the eighth tier of Norwegian football. Ahead of the 2024 season, he was hired as the new player developer of Strømsgodset. On 12 February 2024, Strømsgodset announced that he died suddenly in Drammen, Norway. He was 39.

== Career statistics ==
Appearances and goals by club, season and competition
Club	Season	League			Cup		Total	
Club	Season	Division	Apps	Goals	Apps	Goals	Apps	Goals
Lyn	2004	Tippeligaen	19	1	6	2	25	3
Lyn	2005	Tippeligaen	17	0	3	1	20	1
Lyn	Total		36	1	9	3	45	4
Bodø/Glimt	2006	Adeccoligaen	21	1	2	0	23	1
Bodø/Glimt	2007	Adeccoligaen	30	7	2	1	32	8
Bodø/Glimt	2008	Tippeligaen	26	1	2	0	28	1
Bodø/Glimt	2009	Tippeligaen	28	2	0	0	28	2
Bodø/Glimt	2010	Adeccoligaen	28	3	2	2	30	5
Bodø/Glimt	2011	Adeccoligaen	29	1	3	0	32	1
Bodø/Glimt	Total		162	15	11	3	173	18
Strømsgodset	2012	Tippeligaen	12	0	1	0	13	0
Strømsgodset	2013	Tippeligaen	18	1	2	0	20	1
Strømsgodset	2014	Tippeligaen	24	3	1	0	25	3
Strømsgodset	2015	Tippeligaen	12	1	2	0	14	1
Strømsgodset	2016	Tippeligaen	18	0	3	0	21	0
Strømsgodset	2017	Eliteserien	11	0	2	1	13	1
Strømsgodset	2018	Eliteserien	8	0	5	0	13	0
Strømsgodset	2019	Eliteserien	9	0	3	1	12	1
Strømsgodset	Total		112	5	19	2	131	7
Career total			310	21	39	8	349	29

== Honours ==
Strømsgodset

- Tippeligaen: 2013
