= List of Norwegian football transfers winter 2019–20 =

This is a list of Norwegian football transfers in the 2019–20 winter transfer window by club. Only clubs of the 2020 Eliteserien and 2020 1. divisjon are included.

The Norwegian winter transfer window ended on 31 March 2020. It is possible to loan players aged 18 to 22 outside of the transfer windows. The player must be homegrown in the club which loans the player out.

== Eliteserien ==
=== Aalesund ===
In: Note: Flags indicate national team as defined under FIFA eligibility rules; some limited exceptions apply. Players may hold more than one non-FIFA nationality.

No.	Pos.	Nation	Player
2	DF	NED	Shaquill Sno (from (Netherlands) Telstar)
6	DF	NED	Daan Klinkenberg (from (Finland) Inter Turku)
11	MF	NOR	Simen Bolkan Nordli (from (Norway) HamKam)
14	MF	ENG	Jordon Mutch (free agent)
20	DF	BDI	Parfait Bizoza (from (Norway) Raufoss)
25	GK	NOR	Gudmund Taksdal Kongshavn (from (Norway) Tromsø)

Out: Note: Flags indicate national team as defined under FIFA eligibility rules; some limited exceptions apply. Players may hold more than one non-FIFA nationality.

No.	Pos.	Nation	Player
6	DF	NED	Kaj Ramsteijn (released)
11	MF	ISL	Aron Elís Þrándarson (to (Denmark) OB)
13	GK	NOR	Tarjei Aase Omenås (retired)
14	FW	SEN	Pape Habib Guèye (to (Belgium) K.V. Kortrijk)
19	DF	ENG	Jernade Meade (released)
20	DF	NOR	Robert Sandnes (retired)
22	DF	NOR	Tega George (to (Norway) Strømmen)
25	DF	NOR	Kristoffer Hay (to (Norway) Bryne)
26	GK	NOR	Marius Berntzen (to (Norway) Øygarden)
27	MF	CRC	Wílmer Azofeifa (loan return to (Norway) Sarpsborg 08)
41	MF	NOR	Markus Karlsbakk (on loan to (Norway) Hødd)
—	DF	NED	Kenny van der Weg (to (Netherlands) TOP Oss)

=== Bodø/Glimt ===
In: Note: Flags indicate national team as defined under FIFA eligibility rules; some limited exceptions apply. Players may hold more than one non-FIFA nationality.

No.	Pos.	Nation	Player
3	DF	ISL	Alfons Sampsted (from (Sweden) Norrköping)
6	DF	NOR	Isak Amundsen (Promoted)
17	FW	NOR	Sebastian Tounekti (from (Norway) Tromsdalen)
20	MF	DEN	Sammy Skytte (from (Denmark) Midtjylland)
21	FW	DEN	Kasper Junker (from (Denmark) Horsens, previously on loan at (Norway) Stabæk)
24	DF	NOR	Aleksander Foosnæs (from (Norway) Ranheim)
26	FW	NOR	Ola Solbakken (from (Norway) Ranheim)

Out: Note: Flags indicate national team as defined under FIFA eligibility rules; some limited exceptions apply. Players may hold more than one non-FIFA nationality.

No.	Pos.	Nation	Player
1	GK	BRA	Ricardo Friedrich (to (Turkey) Ankaragücü)
6	MF	NOR	Vegard Leikvoll Moberg (to (Denmark) Silkeborg)
17	FW	ESP	José Isidoro (to (Norway) Junkeren)
19	FW	FRA	Amadou Konaté (on loan to (France) Lyon-Duchère)
23	MF	ISL	Oliver Sigurjónsson (to (Iceland) Breiðablik)
26	MF	NOR	Håkon Evjen (to (Netherlands) AZ Alkmaar)
29	DF	NOR	Erlend Dahl Reitan (loan return to (Norway) Rosenborg)
32	MF	NOR	Casper Øyvann (to Tromsdalen, previously on loan at (Norway) Mjølner)
35	FW	NOR	Adrian Skindlo (to (Norway) Junkeren, previously on loan at (Norway) Mjølner)
36	DF	NOR	Andreas van der Spa (to (Norway) Øygarden, previously on loan at (Norway) Alta)

=== Brann ===
In: Note: Flags indicate national team as defined under FIFA eligibility rules; some limited exceptions apply. Players may hold more than one non-FIFA nationality.

No.	Pos.	Nation	Player
14	FW	NOR	Erlend Hustad (loan return from (Norway) Øygarden)
16	MF	FIN	Robert Taylor (from (Norway) Tromsø)
19	DF	NOR	Jon-Helge Tveita (from (Norway) Sarpsborg 08)
20	FW	NOR	Marcus Mehnert (loan return from (Norway) Øygarden)
23	MF	DEN	Daniel A. Pedersen (from (Norway) Lillestrøm)
25	DF	NOR	Ole Martin Kolskogen (from (Norway) Åsane)
44	GK	GER	Ralf Fährmann (on loan from (Germany) Schalke 04)

Out: Note: Flags indicate national team as defined under FIFA eligibility rules; some limited exceptions apply. Players may hold more than one non-FIFA nationality.

No.	Pos.	Nation	Player
3	DF	NED	Vito Wormgoor (to (United States) Columbus Crew)
6	DF	SWE	Jesper Löfgren (on loan to (Sweden) Mjällby)
16	MF	NOR	Ruben Yttergård Jenssen (to (Norway) Tromsø)
18	FW	NOR	Azar Karadas (retired)
19	FW	NOR	Veton Berisha (to (Norway) Viking)
24	GK	NOR	Emil Harloff (released, previously on loan at (Norway) Nest-Sotra)
32	DF	NOR	Emil Kalsaas (on loan to (Norway) Åsane)
34	MF	NOR	Marius Bildøy (to (Norway) Lysekloster)
35	DF	NOR	Nicholas Marthinussen (on loan to (Norway) Notodden, previously on loan at (Norway) Sotra)
37	MF	NOR	Andreas Mjøs (retired)
—	MF	NOR	Eirik Moldenes (to (Norway) Øygarden)

=== Haugesund ===
In: Note: Flags indicate national team as defined under FIFA eligibility rules; some limited exceptions apply. Players may hold more than one non-FIFA nationality.

No.	Pos.	Nation	Player
9	FW	FIN	Benjamin Källman (loan from (Finland) Inter Turku)
11	FW	DEN	Alexander Ammitzbøll (loan from (Denmark) AGF)
15	DF	NOR	Ulrik Fredriksen (from (Norway) Sogndal)
21	FW	NGA	Shuaibu Ibrahim (loan return from (Norway) Kongsvinger)
27	MF	NOR	Mads Berg Sande (from (Norway) Øygarden)

Out: Note: Flags indicate national team as defined under FIFA eligibility rules; some limited exceptions apply. Players may hold more than one non-FIFA nationality.

No.	Pos.	Nation	Player
1	GK	POL	Maciej Gostomski (to (Poland) Bytovia Bytów)
2	DF	SWE	Doug Bergqvist (loan return to (Sweden) Östersund)
8	MF	NOR	Sondre Tronstad (to (Netherlands) SBV Vitesse)
11	MF	NOR	Martin Samuelsen (loan return to (England) West Ham)
18	DF	DEN	Pascal Gregor (loan return to (Denmark) Helsingør)
20	FW	MLI	Ibrahima Koné (on loan to (Turkey) Adana Demirspor)
25	DF	NOR	Stian Ringstad (released)
35	MF	NGA	Anthony Ikedi (to (Norway) Øygarden, previously on loan)
36	FW	NOR	Eric Ndayisenga (to (Norway) Djerv 1919)
82	GK	DEN	Oskar Snorre (loan return to (Denmark) Lyngby)
93	DF	NOR	Dennis Horneland (on loan to (Norway) Vard Haugesund)
—	GK	NOR	Herman Fossdal (to (Norway) Djerv 1919, previously on loan)

=== Kristiansund ===
In: Note: Flags indicate national team as defined under FIFA eligibility rules; some limited exceptions apply. Players may hold more than one non-FIFA nationality.

No.	Pos.	Nation	Player
14	MF	NOR	Horenus Tadesse (from Levanger)
16	DF	NOR	Ivar Furu (from Ranheim)
17	MF	NOR	Olaus Skarsem (from Rosenborg)
18	FW	ETH	Amin Askar (from Sarpsborg 08)
20	MF	SEN	Cavin Diagné (from (Belgium) Club Brugge)
27	MF	NOR	Sander Lille-Løvø (promoted from junior squad)

Out: Note: Flags indicate national team as defined under FIFA eligibility rules; some limited exceptions apply. Players may hold more than one non-FIFA nationality.

No.	Pos.	Nation	Player
7	FW	NOR	Torgil Øwre Gjertsen (to (Poland) Wisła Płock)
14	MF	NOR	Jesper Isaksen (to Stabæk)
16	MF	FRO	Meinhard Olsen (to (Faroe Islands) B36 Tórshavn)
17	DF	NOR	Christopher Lindquist (loan return to Strømsgodset)
20	FW	SWE	Simon Alexandersson (to (Sweden) Öster, previously on loan at (Sweden) Dalkurd)
21	MF	SEN	Amidou Diop (to (Turkey) Adanaspor)
25	DF	NOR	Henrik Gjesdal (to Start)

=== Mjøndalen ===
In: Note: Flags indicate national team as defined under FIFA eligibility rules; some limited exceptions apply. Players may hold more than one non-FIFA nationality.

No.	Pos.	Nation	Player
1	GK	IRN	Sosha Makani (from (Iran) Naft Masjed Soleymanl)
7	MF	NOR	Lars Olden Larsen (from KFUM) {{Fs player|no=14|nat=CIV|name=Vamouti Diomande|pos=MF|other= loan return from {{Ull/Kisa}}
16	MF	ISL	Dagur Dan Thórhallsson (loan return from Kvik Halden)
17	DF	NOR	Markus Nakkim (from Vålerenga)
18	FW	NOR	Andreas Hellum (loan return from Strømmen)
19	FW	NOR	Magnus Bækken (from Hallingdal)
21	FW	NOR	Alfred Scriven (loan return from Ull/Kisa)
29	MF	NOR	Kristoffer Nesse Stephensen (from Øygarden)

Out: Note: Flags indicate national team as defined under FIFA eligibility rules; some limited exceptions apply. Players may hold more than one non-FIFA nationality.

No.	Pos.	Nation	Player
10	FW	CAN	Olivier Occéan (to Urædd)
12	GK	NOR	Julian Faye Lund (loan return to Rosenborg)
19	MF	SWE	Pontus Silfwer (to (Sweden) GIF Sundsvall)
22	FW	SWE	Jacob Bergström (to (Sweden) Mjällby)
22	MF	NOR	Henrik Gulden (released)
24	DF	NOR	Erick Sagbakken (released)
31	FW	GAM	Jibril Bojang (to (Egypt) FC Masr)
34	DF	NOR	Per Magnus Steiring (loan return to Sogndal)
—	MF	NOR	Sebastian Temte Hansen (to Notodden, previously on loan)

=== Molde ===
In: Note: Flags indicate national team as defined under FIFA eligibility rules; some limited exceptions apply. Players may hold more than one non-FIFA nationality.

No.	Pos.	Nation	Player
3	DF	NOR	Martin Ove Roseth (loan return from (Norway) Sogndal)
6	DF	NOR	Stian Rode Gregersen (loan return from (Sweden) Elfsborg)
21	MF	NOR	Tobias Svendsen (loan return from (Norway) Nest-Sotra)
25	DF	NOR	John Kitolano (loan from (England) Wolverhampton)
27	DF	NOR	Marcus Holmgren Pedersen (from (Norway) Tromsø)

Out: Note: Flags indicate national team as defined under FIFA eligibility rules; some limited exceptions apply. Players may hold more than one non-FIFA nationality.

No.	Pos.	Nation	Player
4	DF	NOR	Ruben Gabrielsen (to (France) Toulouse)
26	GK	NOR	Mathias Eriksen Ranmark (on loan to (Norway) HamKam)
27	FW	NGA	Daniel Chima Chukwu (to (China) Taizhou Yuanda, previously on loan at (China) Heilongjiang Lava Spring)
45	MF	NOR	Emil Breivik (on loan to (Norway) Raufoss)
46	MF	NOR	Tobias Hestad (on loan to (Norway) Stjørdals-Blink, previously on loan at (Norway) Asker)
49	FW	NOR	Sivert Gussiås (to (Norway) Sandefjord, previously on loan at (Norway) Strømmen)
50	MF	NOR	Jakob Ørsahl (on loan to (Norway) Notodden)

=== Odd ===
In: Note: Flags indicate national team as defined under FIFA eligibility rules; some limited exceptions apply. Players may hold more than one non-FIFA nationality.

No.	Pos.	Nation	Player
10	FW	NGA	Onyekachi Hope Ugwuadu (from Sandnes Ulf)
17	MF	NOR	Elias Uppheim Skogvoll (from Mjølner)
25	DF	NOR	Tobias Hallstensen (from Florø)

Out: Note: Flags indicate national team as defined under FIFA eligibility rules; some limited exceptions apply. Players may hold more than one non-FIFA nationality.

No.	Pos.	Nation	Player
7	MF	NOR	Fredrik Oldrup Jensen (loan return to (Belgium) Zulte Waregem)
8	MF	NOR	Jone Samuelsen (retired)
10	FW	NOR	Moussa Njie (loan return to (Serbia) Partizan)
15	MF	NOR	Filip Delaveris (to (Netherlands) Vitesse)
24	MF	NOR	André Sødlund (to Sandnes Ulf)

=== Rosenborg ===
In: Note: Flags indicate national team as defined under FIFA eligibility rules; some limited exceptions apply. Players may hold more than one non-FIFA nationality.

No.	Pos.	Nation	Player
9	FW	SWE	Dino Islamović (from (Sweden) Östersunds FK)
11	FW	DEN	Carlo Holse (from (Denmark) FC Copenhagen)
13	GK	NOR	Julian Faye Lund (loan return from Mjøndalen)
18	MF	NOR	Kristoffer Zachariassen (from Sarpsborg 08)
21	DF	NOR	Erlend Dahl Reitan (loan return from Bodø/Glimt)

Out: Note: Flags indicate national team as defined under FIFA eligibility rules; some limited exceptions apply. Players may hold more than one non-FIFA nationality.

No.	Pos.	Nation	Player
5	MF	SRB	Đorđe Denić (on loan to (Cyprus) Apollon Limassol)
7	MF	DEN	Mike Jensen (to (Cyprus) APOEL)
11	MF	NOR	Yann-Erik de Lanlay (to Viking)
14	FW	NOR	Alexander Søderlund (to (Sweden) Häcken)
17	FW	NGA	David Akintola (loan return to (Denmark) FC Midtjylland)
23	FW	NOR	Bjørn Maars Johnsen (loan return to (Netherlands) AZ Alkmaar)
24	GK	NOR	Arild Østbø (to Viking)
—	MF	NOR	Tobias Bjørnebye (to Sogndal, previously on loan at Hødd)
—	MF	NOR	Olaus Skarsem (to Kristiansund, previously on loan at Ranheim)
—	FW	SWE	Jonathan Levi (to (Sweden) Norrköping, previously on loan at (Sweden) Elfsborg)

=== Sandefjord ===
In: Note: Flags indicate national team as defined under FIFA eligibility rules; some limited exceptions apply. Players may hold more than one non-FIFA nationality.

No.	Pos.	Nation	Player
8	FW	BRA	Zé Eduardo (from (Switzerland) Wil)
9	FW	NOR	Sivert Gussiås (from Molde)
11	MF	NOR	Kristoffer Normann Hansen (from Ull/Kisa)
15	FW	NOR	Erik Næsbak Brenden (from Lillestrøm)
16	MF	NOR	Sander Risan Mørk (loan return from Fram Larvik)
24	MF	NOR	Martin Andersen (promoted from junior squad)
25	MF	NOR	Henrik S. Falchener (promoted from junior squad)
—		NOR	Herman Solberg Nilsen (loan return from Fram Larvik)

Out: Note: Flags indicate national team as defined under FIFA eligibility rules; some limited exceptions apply. Players may hold more than one non-FIFA nationality.

No.	Pos.	Nation	Player
6	MF	NOR	Mohamed Ofkir (to Sarpsborg 08)
8	MF	NOR	Erik Mjelde (retired)
9	MF	NOR	Håvard Storbæk (retired)
12	GK	FIN	Walter Viitala (to (Finland) SJK)
15	FW	SWE	Pontus Engblom (to (Sweden) GIF Sundsvall)
24	MF	ESP	Tito (released)
42	MF	NOR	Jakob Maslø Dunsby (released)
—	MF	NOR	Ole Breistøl (to Ull/Kisa, previously on loan at Fram Larvik)

=== Sarpsborg 08 ===
In: Note: Flags indicate national team as defined under FIFA eligibility rules; some limited exceptions apply. Players may hold more than one non-FIFA nationality.

No.	Pos.	Nation	Player
2	DF	GAM	Sulayman Bojang (loan return from Kongsvinger)
8	MF	NOR	Mohamed Ofkir (from Sandefjord)
14	MF	SWE	Anton Salétros (on loan from (Russia) Rostov)
17	MF	NOR	Joachim Soltvedt (from Sogndal)
18	MF	NOR	Sebastian Jarl (loan return from KFUM)
20	MF	CRC	Wílmer Azofeifa (loan return from Aalesund)
24	MF	NOR	Anwar Elyounoussi (loan return from Fram Larvik)
27	FW	MLI	Boubacar Konté (loan return from (Denmark) Nordsjælland)
33	GK	SWE	David Mitov Nilsson (from (Sweden) GIF Sundsvall)
70	MF	EGY	Alexander Jakobsen (from (Sweden) IFK Norrköping)

Out: Note: Flags indicate national team as defined under FIFA eligibility rules; some limited exceptions apply. Players may hold more than one non-FIFA nationality.

No.	Pos.	Nation	Player
1	GK	NOR	Sander Thulin (released, previously on loan at Kråkerøy)
2	DF	NED	Bart Straalman (to (France) Rodez AF)
5	DF	NOR	Niklas Gunnarsson (to Strømsgodset)
5	DF	CRC	Pablo Arboine (on loan to (Costa Rica) A.D. San Carlos, previously on loan at (Denmark) Køge)
8	MF	DEN	Matti Lund Nielsen (to (Italy) Reggina)
13	DF	AUT	Mario Pavelić (loan return to (Croatia) Rijeka)
17	MF	NOR	Kristoffer Zachariassen (to Rosenborg)
19	MF	NOR	Kristoffer Larsen (released)
22	DF	NOR	Jon-Helge Tveita (to Brann)
23	MF	GLP	Lenny Nangis (released)
30	GK	FRA	Alexandre Letellier (loan return to (France) Angers)
48	FW	NIR	Kyle Lafferty (to (England) Sunderland)
77	FW	ETH	Amin Askar (to Kristiansund)

=== Stabæk ===
In: Note: Flags indicate national team as defined under FIFA eligibility rules; some limited exceptions apply. Players may hold more than one non-FIFA nationality.

No.	Pos.	Nation	Player
1	GK	NOR	Marius Amundsen Ulla (promoted from junior squad)
5	DF	NOR	Mats Solheim (from (Sweden) Hammarby)
7	MF	NOR	Jesper Isaksen (from Kristiansund)
10	MF	USA	Romain Gall (on loan from (Sweden) Malmö)
17	MF	TPE	Will Donkin (from (England) Crystal Palace U-23s)
21	MF	NOR	Magnus Strandman Lundal (promoted from junior squad)
26	DF	NOR	Emil Jonassen (free agent)
72	FW	SVN	Filip Valenčič (loan return from (Finland) Inter Turku)
77	FW	NOR	Fitim Azemi (from Vålerenga)
88	FW	NOR	Christopher Cheng (promoted from junior squad)

Out: Note: Flags indicate national team as defined under FIFA eligibility rules; some limited exceptions apply. Players may hold more than one non-FIFA nationality.

No.	Pos.	Nation	Player
1	GK	NOR	Simen Lillevik Kjellevold (to Strømmen)
2	DF	VEN	Ronald Hernández (to (Scotland) Aberdeen)
4	DF	NOR	Vadim Demidov (retired)
5	DF	NOR	Steinar Strømnes (to Hamkam)
7	MF	GHA	Raymond Gyasi (to (Finland) RoPS)
9	FW	NOR	Sindre Mauritz-Hansen (released)
10	MF	DEN	Youssef Toutouh (loan return to (Denmark) AGF Aarhus)
14	MF	NOR	Kristoffer Askildsen (to (Italy) Sampdoria)
15	DF	NOR	Morten Renå Olsen (to Strømmen, previously on loan at Notodden)
17	FW	NOR	Daniel Braaten (released)
21	FW	DEN	Kasper Junker (loan return to (Denmark) Horsens)
22	MF	DEN	Sammy Skytte (loan return to (Denmark) Midtjylland)
29	FW	NOR	Oscar Aga (to Grorud, previously on loan)
88	MF	NOR	Herman Geelmuyden (to (Netherlands) Jong PSV)

=== Start ===
In: Note: Flags indicate national team as defined under FIFA eligibility rules; some limited exceptions apply. Players may hold more than one non-FIFA nationality.

No.	Pos.	Nation	Player
11	MF	NOR	Eirik Schulze (from Sogndal)
12	GK	NOR	Amund Wichne (from Viking)
24	MF	ISL	Guðmundur Andri Tryggvason (loan return from (Iceland) Vikingur)
25	DF	NOR	Henrik Gjesdal (from Kristiansund)
68	MF	NOR	Johannes Eftevaag (promoted from junior squad)

Out: Note: Flags indicate national team as defined under FIFA eligibility rules; some limited exceptions apply. Players may hold more than one non-FIFA nationality.

No.	Pos.	Nation	Player
3	DF	NOR	Espen Hammer Berger (to Sandnes Ulf)
11	FW	ISL	Aron Sigurðarson (to (Belgium) Union Saint-Gilloise)
13	GK	NOR	Alexander Pedersen (to KFUM)
33	FW	SWE	Isac Lidberg (to (Sweden) Gefle, previously on loan at (Sweden) Brommapojkarna)

=== Strømsgodset ===
In: Note: Flags indicate national team as defined under FIFA eligibility rules; some limited exceptions apply. Players may hold more than one non-FIFA nationality.

No.	Pos.	Nation	Player
2	DF	ISL	Ari Leifsson (from (Iceland) Fylkir)
5	DF	NOR	Niklas Gunnarsson (from Sarpsborg)
9	FW	DEN	Marcus Mølvadgaard (from (Denmark) Randers)
17	MF	NOR	Tobias Fjeld Gulliksen (promoted from junior squad)
19	FW	NOR	Halldor Stenevik (loan return from Sogndal)
23	MF	LVA	Jānis Ikaunieks (from (Latvia) FK Liepaja)
40	GK	NOR	Morten Sætra (loan return from Strømmen)
58	FW	NOR	Simen Hammershaug (loan return from Asker)
70	DF	NOR	Sondre Fosnæss Hanssen (promoted from junior squad)
—	FW	NOR	Sebastian Pedersen (loan return from Florø)

Out: Note: Flags indicate national team as defined under FIFA eligibility rules; some limited exceptions apply. Players may hold more than one non-FIFA nationality.

No.	Pos.	Nation	Player
2	DF	NOR	Mounir Hamoud (retired)
5	DF	NOR	Jakob Glesnes (to (United States) Philadelphia Union)
6	MF	NOR	Henning Hauger (released)
17	DF	NOR	Christopher Lindquist (released, previously on loan at Kristiansund)
18	MF	NOR	Martin Rønning Ovenstad (released)
21	MF	NOR	Mathias Gjerstrøm (to Kongsvinger, previously on loan)
23	MF	DEN	Martin Spelmann (released)
35	GK	DEN	Martin Hansen (to (Germany) Hannover 96)
35	DF	NOR	Arnar Thor Gudjonsson (to Grorud, previously on loan at Fram Larvik)
36	MF	NOR	Hasan Duman (to Åssiden)
39	DF	NOR	Lars Sætra (to Tromsø)
77	MF	NOR	Muhamed Keita (to (Saudi Arabia) Ohod Club)
80	DF	NOR	Andreas Nyhagen (on loan to Moss, previously loan at Grorud)

=== Viking ===
In: Note: Flags indicate national team as defined under FIFA eligibility rules; some limited exceptions apply. Players may hold more than one non-FIFA nationality.

No.	Pos.	Nation	Player
2	DF	NOR	Herman Haugen (promoted from junior squad)
8	MF	NZL	Joe Bell (from (United States) Virginia Cavaliers)
11	MF	NOR	Yann-Erik de Lanlay (from Rosenborg)
14	FW	NOR	Veton Berisha (from Brann)
17	MF	NOR	Sebastian Sebulonsen (from Sola)
22	GK	NOR	Arild Østbø (from Rosenborg)
26	FW	NOR	Jefferson de Souza (from Brodd)

Out: Note: Flags indicate national team as defined under FIFA eligibility rules; some limited exceptions apply. Players may hold more than one non-FIFA nationality.

No.	Pos.	Nation	Player
4	DF	NOR	Tord Johnsen Salte (on loan to Sandnes Ulf)
11	FW	NOR	Zlatko Tripić (to (Turkey) Göztepe)
14	MF	NOR	André Danielsen (retired)
15	GK	NOR	Amund Wichne (to Start)
19	FW	NOR	Jostein Ekeland (to Sandnes Ulf)
22	MF	NOR	Lasse Berg Johnsen (to Raufoss, previously on loan at Tromsdalen)
25	FW	NGA	Usman Sale (to (Finland) KuPS)
27	MF	ISL	Samúel Friðjónsson (loan return to (Norway) Vålerenga)
28	MF	NOR	Kristian Thorstvedt (to (Belgium) Genk)
29	FW	FIN	Benjamin Källman (loan return to (Finland) Inter Turku)

=== Vålerenga ===
In: Note: Flags indicate national team as defined under FIFA eligibility rules; some limited exceptions apply. Players may hold more than one non-FIFA nationality.

No.	Pos.	Nation	Player
5	DF	URU	Felipe Carvalho (loan return from (Uruguay) Nacional)
14	MF	NOR	Fredrik Oldrup Jensen (from (Belgium) Zulte Waregem)
19	FW	NGA	Peter Godly Michael (loan return from (Norway) Skeid)
24	DF	NOR	Oskar Opsahl (loan return from (Norway) Skeid)
26	MF	NOR	Osame Sahraoui (promoted from junior squad)
31	DF	NOR	Brage Skaret (promoted from junior squad)
—	MF	NOR	Brede Sandmoen (promoted from junior squad)

Out: Note: Flags indicate national team as defined under FIFA eligibility rules; some limited exceptions apply. Players may hold more than one non-FIFA nationality.

No.	Pos.	Nation	Player
2	DF	NOR	Markus Nakkim (to (Norway) Mjøndalen)
5	DF	MEX	Efraín Juárez (retired)
9	FW	CRC	Mayron George (loan return to (Denmark) FC Midtjylland)
9	FW	NOR	Fitim Azemi (to (Norway) Stabæk, previously on loan at (Norway) Tromsø)
14	MF	GHA	Mohammed Abu (on loan to (United States) D.C. United)
17	DF	NOR	Leo Cornic (to (Norway) Grorud, previously on loan to (Norway) Bærum)
20	MF	NOR	Sakarias Opsahl (on loan to (Norway) Tromsø, previously on loan at (Norway) Ull/Kisa)
27	MF	ISL	Samúel Friðjónsson (to (Germany) SC Paderborn 07, previously on loan at (Norway) Viking)
27	DF	DEN	Pierre Kanstrup (to (Denmark) SønderjyskE)
29	MF	NOR	Mohammed Fellah (released)

== 1. divisjon ==
=== Grorud ===
In: Note: Flags indicate national team as defined under FIFA eligibility rules; some limited exceptions apply. Players may hold more than one non-FIFA nationality.

No.	Pos.	Nation	Player
4	DF	NOR	Arnar Thor Gudjonsson (from Strømsgodset)
19	FW	NOR	Oscar Aga (from Stabæk, previously on loan)
23	FW	NOR	Josias Furaha (from Vålerenga U19)
26	MF	GRE	Christos Zafeiris (from Vålerenga U19)
32	DF	NOR	Leo Cornic (from Vålerenga)
—	MF	NOR	Remi Jensen Telle (loan return from Rommen)

Out: Note: Flags indicate national team as defined under FIFA eligibility rules; some limited exceptions apply. Players may hold more than one non-FIFA nationality.

No.	Pos.	Nation	Player
17	FW	NOR	Thierry Dabove (loan return to Raufoss)
23	DF	NOR	Emilio Garcia (retired)
29	MF	NOR	Elias Flø (to Lokomotiv Oslo)
44	DF	NOR	Andreas Nyhagen (loan return to Strømsgodset)

=== HamKam ===
In: Note: Flags indicate national team as defined under FIFA eligibility rules; some limited exceptions apply. Players may hold more than one non-FIFA nationality.

No.	Pos.	Nation	Player
4	MF	NOR	Erik Olaf Krohnstad (from (Norway) Brann 2)
5	DF	NOR	Steinar Strømnes (from (Norway) Stabæk)
7	MF	DEN	Ahmed Daghim (on loan from (Denmark) F.C. Copenhagen)
15	MF	NOR	Vetle Skjærvik (from (Norway) Lillehammer)
16	DF	NOR	Anders Bakken Dieserud (from (Norway) Strømmen)
17	DF	NOR	Kristian Strande (from (Norway) Brattvåg)
19	MF	NOR	Sander Eng Strand (loan return from (Norway) Elverum)
33	GK	NOR	Mathias Eriksen Ranmark (on loan from (Norway) Molde)

Out: Note: Flags indicate national team as defined under FIFA eligibility rules; some limited exceptions apply. Players may hold more than one non-FIFA nationality.

No.	Pos.	Nation	Player
4	DF	DEN	Jacob Egeris (to (Denmark) Nykøbing)
5	DF	FRO	Odmar Færø (to (Faroe Islands) KÍ)
7	MF	NOR	Petter Vaagan Moen (retired)
11	MF	NOR	Ole Erik Midtskogen (to (Faroe Islands) KÍ)
12	GK	POL	Lukasz Jarosinski (released)
17	MF	NOR	Simen Bolkan Nordli (to (Norway) Aalesund)
18	FW	SEN	Jean Alassane Mendy (released)
21		NOR	Luca Taouss Sveen (to (Norway) Ottestad)
24	DF	NOR	Hans Norbye (to (Norway) Alta)
25	DF	NOR	Davod Arzani (on loan to (Norway) Brumunddal)
30	GK	NOR	Andreas Hippe Fagereng (on loan to (Norway) Elverum)
99	FW	NGA	Abubakar Aliyu Ibrahim (to (Faroe Islands) KÍ)

=== Jerv ===
In: Note: Flags indicate national team as defined under FIFA eligibility rules; some limited exceptions apply. Players may hold more than one non-FIFA nationality.

No.	Pos.	Nation	Player
5	DF	NOR	John Olav Norheim (from (Norway) Strømmen)
9	FW	CRC	Diego Campos (from (United States) Chicago Fire)
19	DF	NOR	Iman Mafi (from (Norway) Kongsvinger)

Out: Note: Flags indicate national team as defined under FIFA eligibility rules; some limited exceptions apply. Players may hold more than one non-FIFA nationality.

No.	Pos.	Nation	Player
2	DF	NOR	Peter Reinhardsen (to (Norway) Arendal)
9	FW	USA	Luke Ferreira (to (United States) Colorado Springs Switchbacks)
10	FW	NOR	Aram Khalili (to (Norway) Innstranda)
14		NOR	Vegard Somdal (to (Norway) Express)
17	MF	NOR	Martin Hoel Andersen (to (Norway) Øygarden)
96	FW	NGA	Anthony Okachi (loan return to (Nigeria) Comets F.C.)
97	FW	FRA	David Faupala (to (Malta) Valletta)

=== KFUM Oslo ===
In: Note: Flags indicate national team as defined under FIFA eligibility rules; some limited exceptions apply. Players may hold more than one non-FIFA nationality.

No.	Pos.	Nation	Player
4	DF	NOR	Jacob Stubberud (from Nordstrand)
10	FW	GAM	Alagie Sanyang (from Moss)
14	MF	NOR	Håkon Helland Hoseth (from Ullern)
17	DF	NOR	Fredrik Kristensen Dahl (from Fram Larvik)
18	GK	NOR	Alexander Pedersen (from Start)
26		NOR	Remi-André Svindland (from Moss)

Out: Note: Flags indicate national team as defined under FIFA eligibility rules; some limited exceptions apply. Players may hold more than one non-FIFA nationality.

No.	Pos.	Nation	Player
4	MF	NOR	Sebastian Jarl (loan return to Sarpsborg 08)
23		NOR	Marius Brevig (released)
26	FW	NOR	Lars Olden Larsen (to Mjøndalen)
31	MF	NOR	Kristian Brix (retired)
—	DF	NOR	Erik Stafford Germundsson (to Nordstrand)
—	DF	NOR	Lars Røttingsnes (to Nordstrand)

=== Kongsvinger ===
In: Note: Flags indicate national team as defined under FIFA eligibility rules; some limited exceptions apply. Players may hold more than one non-FIFA nationality.

No.	Pos.	Nation	Player
1	GK	FIN	Saku-Pekka Sahlgren (from (Norway) Sandnes Ulf)
3	DF	NOR	Victor Grodås (from (Norway) Strømmen)
17	MF	NOR	Mathias Gjerstrøm (from (Norway) Strømsgodset, previously on loan)
20	MF	NOR	Even Bydal (loan return from (Norway) Asker)
29	MF	NOR	Eirik Mæland (from (Norway) Fredrikstad)

Out: Note: Flags indicate national team as defined under FIFA eligibility rules; some limited exceptions apply. Players may hold more than one non-FIFA nationality.

No.	Pos.	Nation	Player
12	GK	NOR	Stian Bolstad (to (Norway) Fjellhamar)
18	DF	NOR	Iman Mafi (to (Norway) Jerv)
19	DF	NOR	Martin Lundal (to (Norway) Ranheim)
25	DF	GAM	Sulayman Bojang (loan return to (Norway) Sarpsborg 08)
26	FW	NGA	Shuaibu Ibrahim (loan return to (Norway) Haugesund)
27	MF	CMR	Landry N'Guemo (released)

=== Lillestrøm ===
In: Note: Flags indicate national team as defined under FIFA eligibility rules; some limited exceptions apply. Players may hold more than one non-FIFA nationality.

No.	Pos.	Nation	Player
6	MF	FIN	Kaan Kairinen (on loan from (Denmark) FC Midtjylland)
25	GK	EST	Matvei Igonen (loan return from (Estonia) Flora Tallinn)
26	DF	NOR	Lars Ranger (loan return from (Norway) Ull/Kisa)
27	FW	NOR	Alexander Hrcka Sannes (promoted from junior squad)
28	MF	NOR	Apipon Tongnoy (promoted from junior squad)

Out: Note: Flags indicate national team as defined under FIFA eligibility rules; some limited exceptions apply. Players may hold more than one non-FIFA nationality.

No.	Pos.	Nation	Player
1	GK	CRO	Marko Marić (loan return to (Germany) 1899 Hoffenheim)
2	DF	NOR	Mats Haakenstad (to (Finland) KuPS)
6	DF	EST	Joonas Tamm (loan return to (Estonia) Flora)
13	DF	NOR	Frode Kippe (retired)
15	MF	NOR	Erik Næsbak Brenden (to (Norway) Sandefjord)
16	MF	NGA	Charles Ezeh (on loan to (Norway) Øygarden, previously on loan at (Norway) Skeid)
23	MF	DEN	Daniel A. Pedersen (to (Norway) Brann)

=== Ranheim ===
In: Note: Flags indicate national team as defined under FIFA eligibility rules; some limited exceptions apply. Players may hold more than one non-FIFA nationality.

No.	Pos.	Nation	Player
4	DF	NOR	Martin Lundal (from (Norway) Kongsvinger)
8	DF	NOR	Magnus Stamnestrø (loan return from (Faroe Islands) Klaksvik)
16	DF	NOR	Robert Williams (from (Norway) Stjørdals-Blink)
17	MF	NOR	Sondre Sørløkk (loan return from (Norway) Stjørdals-Blink)
20	FW	NOR	Ole Sæter (from (Norway) Nardo)
21	MF	NOR	Jakob Tromsdal (loan return from (Norway) Stjørdals-Blink)
22	MF	NOR	Sivert Solli (loan return from (Norway) Stjørdals-Blink)
24	FW	NOR	Magnus Høiseth (from (Norway) Orkla)
26		NOR	Sondre Klingen Langås (promoted from junior squad)

Out: Note: Flags indicate national team as defined under FIFA eligibility rules; some limited exceptions apply. Players may hold more than one non-FIFA nationality.

No.	Pos.	Nation	Player
4	DF	NOR	Ivar Furu (to (Norway) Kristiansund)
10	MF	NOR	Øyvind Storflor (retired)
13	FW	NOR	Joachim Olufsen (to (Norway) Stjørdals-Blink)
16	MF	NOR	Olaus Skarsem (loan return to (Norway) Rosenborg)
19	DF	NOR	Glenn Walker (released, previously on loan to (Norway) Hødd)
20	FW	NOR	Kim Ove Riksvold (to (Norway) Nardo)
22	FW	NOR	Erlend Sørhøy (to (Norway) Kolstad)
24	DF	NOR	Aleksander Foosnæs (to (Norway) Bodø/Glimt)
25	FW	NOR	Mushaga Bakenga (loan return to (Norway) Tromsø)
26	FW	NOR	Ola Solbakken (to (Norway) Bodø/Glimt)
—	FW	NOR	Mats Lillebo (to (Norway) Stjørdals-Blink, previously on loan)
—	MF	NOR	Fredrik Vinje (to (Norway) Stjørdals-Blink, previously on loan)

=== Raufoss ===
In: Note: Flags indicate national team as defined under FIFA eligibility rules; some limited exceptions apply. Players may hold more than one non-FIFA nationality.

No.	Pos.	Nation	Player
3	DF	NOR	Amund Møllerhagen (promoted from junior squad)
9	FW	DEN	Lee Rochester Sørensen (from (Denmark) FC Roskilde)
15	MF	NOR	Martin Heiberg (loan return from (Norway) Elverum)
21	FW	NOR	Lasse Berg Johnsen (from (Norway) Viking)

Out: Note: Flags indicate national team as defined under FIFA eligibility rules; some limited exceptions apply. Players may hold more than one non-FIFA nationality.

No.	Pos.	Nation	Player
9	FW	SWE	Anton Henningsson (released)
16		NOR	Simen Schjerve Giæver (to (Norway) Toten)
19	DF	BDI	Parfait Bizoza (to (Norway) Aalesund)
21	FW	NOR	Thierry Dabove (to (Norway) Bryne, previously on loan at (Norway) Grorud)

=== Sandnes Ulf ===
In: Note: Flags indicate national team as defined under FIFA eligibility rules; some limited exceptions apply. Players may hold more than one non-FIFA nationality.

No.	Pos.	Nation	Player
2	DF	NOR	Espen Hammer Berger (from (Norway) Start)
4	DF	NOR	Kevin Jablinski (from (Norway) Egersund)
9	FW	NOR	Jostein Ekeland (from (Norway) Viking)
19	MF	NOR	Johannes Nunez Godoy (from (Norway) Skeid)
21	MF	NOR	André Sødlund (from (Norway) Odd)
23	DF	NOR	Tord Johnsen Salte (on loan from (Norway) Viking)
24	FW	NOR	Artan Memedov (promoted from junior squad)
25	MF	NOR	Sander Ringberg (from (Norway) Tromsdalen)

Out: Note: Flags indicate national team as defined under FIFA eligibility rules; some limited exceptions apply. Players may hold more than one non-FIFA nationality.

No.	Pos.	Nation	Player
1	GK	FIN	Saku-Pekka Sahlgren (to Kongsvinger)
2		NOR	Chris André Formo (to Egersund)
4	DF	NOR	Axel Kryger (to Sogndal)
5	DF	NOR	Daniel Edvardsen (retired)
9	FW	NGA	Onyekachi Hope Ugwuadu (to Odd)
14	DF	NOR	Akinsola Akinyemi (to (Bulgaria) Lokomotiv Plovdiv)
16	DF	FIN	Tapio Heikkilä (to (Finland) Honka)
18	DF	NOR	Bjørnar Holmvik (retired)
21	MF	NOR	Herman Kleppa (to Egersund, previously on loan)

=== Sogndal ===
In: Note: Flags indicate national team as defined under FIFA eligibility rules; some limited exceptions apply. Players may hold more than one non-FIFA nationality.

No.	Pos.	Nation	Player
1	GK	NED	Renze Fij (from Nest-Sotra)
3	DF	NOR	Per Magnus Steiring (loan return from Mjøndalen)
5	DF	NOR	Daniel Eid (from Hødd)
6	DF	NOR	Axel Kryger (from Sandnes Ulf)
19	MF	NOR	Tobias Bjørnebye (from Rosenborg)
27	DF	NOR	Adrian Solberg (promoted from junior squad)
28	FW	NOR	Mathias Sundberg (promoted from junior squad)

Out: Note: Flags indicate national team as defined under FIFA eligibility rules; some limited exceptions apply. Players may hold more than one non-FIFA nationality.

No.	Pos.	Nation	Player
1	GK	NOR	Mathias Dyngeland (to (Sweden) Elfsborg)
5	DF	NOR	Ulrik Fredriksen (to (Norway) Haugesund)
6	MF	DEN	Steffen Ernemann (retired)
7	MF	NOR	Eirik Schulze (to (Norway) Start)
9	MF	NOR	Ulrik Flo (retired)
14	DF	NOR	Ole Martin Rindarøy (retired)
15	MF	NOR	Joachim Soltvedt (to (Norway) Sarpsborg 08)
16	DF	NOR	Martin Ove Roseth (loan return to (Norway) Molde)
17	MF	GUI	Mohamed Didé Fofana (released, previously on loan at (Iceland) Víkingur)
19	FW	NOR	Halldor Stenevik (loan return to (Norway) Strømsgodset)
—	FW	MNE	Staniša Mandić (to (Slovenia) Mura, previously on loan at (Bosnia and Herzegovina) Zrinjski Mostar)

=== Stjørdals-Blink ===
In: Note: Flags indicate national team as defined under FIFA eligibility rules; some limited exceptions apply. Players may hold more than one non-FIFA nationality.

No.	Pos.	Nation	Player
6	MF	NOR	Fredrik Vinje (from (Norway) Ranheim, previously on loan)
9	FW	NOR	Mats Lillebo (from (Norway) Ranheim, previously on loan)
11	FW	NOR	Joachim Olufsen (from (Norway) Ranheim)
12	GK	NOR	Isak Lein Valberg (from (Norway) Levanger)
14	MF	NOR	Morten Strand (from (Norway) Nardo)
19	MF	NOR	Tobias Hestad (on loan from (Norway) Molde)
20	MF	NOR	Simen Raaen Sandmæl (from (Faroe Islands) KÍ Klaksvík)
21	GK	SWE	Jonatan Johansson (free transfer)
22	MF	NOR	Patrik Dønheim Hjelmseth (from (Norway) Brattvåg)
23		NOR	Sander Halgunset (from (Norway) Byåsen)
29	FW	NOR	Robin Bjørnholm-Jatta (from (Norway) Byåsen)
—	FW	NOR	Olaf Lien Skive (from (Norway) Lånke)

Out: Note: Flags indicate national team as defined under FIFA eligibility rules; some limited exceptions apply. Players may hold more than one non-FIFA nationality.

No.	Pos.	Nation	Player
1	GK	NOR	Daniel Hagen (released)
7	DF	NOR	Knut Kåre Aftret Brøndbo (released)
10	MF	NOR	Sondre Sørløkk (loan return to (Norway) Ranheim)
11	MF	NOR	Sivert Solli (loan return to (Norway) Ranheim)
16	DF	ISL	Ottar Huni Magnusson (to (Norway) Nardo)
17	FW	NOR	Jørgen Kjøsnes Valleraunet (to (Norway) Nardo)
20	MF	NOR	Jakob Tromsdal (loan return to (Norway) Ranheim)
25		NOR	Markus Balstad Husby (released)
45	DF	NOR	Robert Williams (to (Norway) Ranheim)
—	FW	NOR	Nedzad Sisic (retired)
—	GK	NOR	Andreas Vikøren (released)

=== Strømmen ===
In: Note: Flags indicate national team as defined under FIFA eligibility rules; some limited exceptions apply. Players may hold more than one non-FIFA nationality.

No.	Pos.	Nation	Player
1	GK	NOR	Simen Lillevik Kjellevold (from (Norway) Stabæk)
3	DF	NOR	Morten Renå Olsen (from (Norway) Stabæk)
6	MF	NOR	Torje Naustdal (from (Norway) Florø)
9	FW	NOR	Willian Pozo-Venta (from (Poland) Stomil Olsztyn)
11	MF	NOR	Morten Bjørlo (from (Norway) Egersund)
12	GK	NOR	Daniel Ravneng (from (Norway) Mjølner)
15	MF	NOR	Youssef Chaib (from (Norway) Kvik Halden)
17	DF	NOR	Tega George (from (Norway) Aalesund)
18	FW	NOR	Lasse Selvåg Nordås (from (Norway) Lillestrøm 2)
31	GK	NOR	Clement Twizere Buhake (from (Norway) Gjelleråsen)
44	GK	NOR	Marcus Myhrer Dyngeland (promoted from junior squad)
58	DF	TUR	Hasan Kuruçay (from (Norway) Florø)

Out: Note: Flags indicate national team as defined under FIFA eligibility rules; some limited exceptions apply. Players may hold more than one non-FIFA nationality.

No.	Pos.	Nation	Player
3	DF	NOR	Victor Grodås (to Kongsvinger)
6	DF	NOR	Anders Bakken Dieserud (to HamKam)
9	FW	NOR	Sivert Gussiås (loan return to Molde)
11	MF	NOR	Ulrich Østigård Ness (to Eidsvold Turn)
15	FW	ISL	Jake Pétur Martin (to Lørenskog)
16	DF	NOR	John Olav Norheim (to Jerv)
17	MF	NOR	Øystein Vestvatn (to Moss)
18	FW	NOR	Andreas Hellum (loan return to Mjøndalen)
21	DF	NOR	Johannes Grødtlien (to Gjelleråsen)
22	DF	NOR	Benjamin Sundo (released)
25	FW	NOR	Lasse Bransdal (released)
27	MF	NOR	Ismael Bahij (released)
31	GK	NOR	Stian Christensen (released)
97	GK	NOR	Morten Sætra (loan return to Strømsgodset)
—	FW	NOR	Bessijan Kastrati (released)

=== Tromsø ===
In: Note: Flags indicate national team as defined under FIFA eligibility rules; some limited exceptions apply. Players may hold more than one non-FIFA nationality.

No.	Pos.	Nation	Player
2	DF	ISL	Adam Örn Arnarson (from (Poland) Górnik Zabrze)
11	MF	NOR	Ruben Yttergård Jenssen (from (Norway) Brann)
18	MF	NOR	Sakarias Opsahl (on loan from (Norway) Vålerenga)
20	FW	NOR	Brage Berg Pedersen (loan return from (Norway) Alta)
21	MF	NOR	Eric Kitolano (from (Norway) Ull/Kisa)
24	FW	NOR	Tobias Hafstad (promoted from junior squad)
32	DF	NOR	Runar Johansen (promoted from junior squad)
33	MF	NOR	Endre Borch Nash (promoted from junior squad)
39	DF	NOR	Lars Sætra (from (Norway) Strømsgodset)

Out: Note: Flags indicate national team as defined under FIFA eligibility rules; some limited exceptions apply. Players may hold more than one non-FIFA nationality.

No.	Pos.	Nation	Player
1	GK	NOR	Gudmund Kongshavn (to (Norway) Aalesund)
2	DF	RUS	Artyom Sokol (loan return to (Russia) Arsenal Tula)
7	MF	NOR	Morten Gamst Pedersen (to (Norway) Alta)
8	MF	DEN	Oliver Kjærgaard (to (Denmark) Helsingør)
9	FW	CRC	Brayan Rojas (loan return to (Costa Rica) Carmelita)
11	MF	FIN	Robert Taylor (to (Norway) Brann)
18	MF	FIN	Onni Valakari (to (Cyprus) Pafos)
19	DF	NOR	Marcus Holmgren Pedersen (to (Norway) Molde)
20	MF	ENG	Aidan Barlow (loan return to (England) Manchester United)
23	MF	SWE	Eric Smith (loan return to (Belgium) Gent)
30	FW	NOR	Runar Espejord (to (Netherlands) Heerenveen)
36	FW	NOR	Bryan Fiabema (to (England) Chelsea U23)
42	FW	NOR	Mushaga Bakenga (released, previously on loan at (Norway) Ranheim)
77	FW	NOR	Fitim Azemi (loan return to (Norway) Vålerenga)
—	MF	NOR	Gustav Severinsen (on loan to (Norway) Florø, previously on loan at (Norway) Alta)
—	MF	NOR	Henrik Johnsgård (to (Norway) Senja, previously on loan)

=== Ull/Kisa ===
In: Note: Flags indicate national team as defined under FIFA eligibility rules; some limited exceptions apply. Players may hold more than one non-FIFA nationality.

No.	Pos.	Nation	Player
4	DF	NOR	Steffen Jenssen (from Notodden)
7	MF	NOR	Erik Rosland (from Bryne)
23	DF	NOR	Sindre Engja Rindal (promoted from junior squad)
15	FW	NOR	Sander Werni (on loan from Vålerenga 2)
18	MF	NOR	Ole Breistøl (from Sandefjord)
19	MF	NOR	Edin Øy (from (Sweden) Ljungskile)
22	FW	NOR	Sander Jonassen Forø (promoted from junior squad)

Out: Note: Flags indicate national team as defined under FIFA eligibility rules; some limited exceptions apply. Players may hold more than one non-FIFA nationality.

No.	Pos.	Nation	Player
4	DF	SOM	Ciise Aden Abshir (retired)
6	MF	NOR	Eric Kitolano (to Tromsø)
7	FW	NOR	Alfred Scriven (loan return to Mjøndalen)
17	DF	NOR	Lars Ranger (loan return to Lillestrøm)
18	FW	NOR	Herman Henriksen (to Eidsvold Turn, previously on loan)
19	MF	NOR	Kristoffer Normann Hansen (to Sandefjord)
22	MF	CIV	Vamouti Diomande (loan return to Mjøndalen)
27	MF	NOR	Sakarias Opsahl (loan return to Vålerenga)

=== Øygarden (formerly Nest-Sotra) ===
In: Note: Flags indicate national team as defined under FIFA eligibility rules; some limited exceptions apply. Players may hold more than one non-FIFA nationality.

No.	Pos.	Nation	Player
1	GK	NOR	Borger Thomas (from (Norway) Sotra)
4	MF	NGA	Anthony Ikedi (from (Norway) Haugesund, previously on loan)
6	MF	ESP	Nando Cózar (from (Cambodia) Angkor Tiger)
9	MF	NOR	Martin Hoel Andersen (from (Norway) Jerv)
10	MF	NOR	Mathias Dahl Abelsen (from (Norway) Mjølner)
11	FW	ENG	Kyle Spence (from (Norway) Alta)
12	MF	NGA	Charles Ezeh (on loan from (Norway) Lillestrøm)
15	MF	NOR	Eirik Moldenes (from (Norway) Brann)
22	DF	NOR	Fabian Filip Rimestad (from (Norway) Fana)
23	MF	NOR	Even Hepsø Vetås (from (Norway) Lysekloster)
27	DF	NOR	Andreas van der Spa (from (Norway) Bodø/Glimt)
30	GK	NOR	Marius Berntzen (from (Norway) Aalesund)

Out: Note: Flags indicate national team as defined under FIFA eligibility rules; some limited exceptions apply. Players may hold more than one non-FIFA nationality.

No.	Pos.	Nation	Player
1	GK	NED	Renze Fij (to Sogndal)
4	DF	NOR	Jonas Heggestad Hestetun (released)
7	FW	NOR	Jo Sondre Aas (to Levanger)
10	FW	NOR	Erlend Hustad (loan return to Brann)
12	GK	NOR	Steffen Haraldsen (released)
20	MF	SWE	Andreas Petersson (to Egersund)
21	MF	NOR	Mads Berg Sande (to Haugesund)
26	DF	NGA	Izuchuckwu Anthony (to (Slovakia) Spartak Trnava)
27	MF	NOR	Tobias Svendsen (loan return to Molde)
29	MF	NOR	Kristoffer Nesse Stephensen (to (Norway) Mjøndalen)
68	DF	SWE	Elmin Nurkić (released)
77	FW	NOR	Marcus Mehnert (loan return to Brann)
99	GK	NOR	Emil Harloff (loan return to Brann)

=== Åsane ===
In: Note: Flags indicate national team as defined under FIFA eligibility rules; some limited exceptions apply. Players may hold more than one non-FIFA nationality.

No.	Pos.	Nation	Player
5	DF	NOR	Sindre Austevoll (from Sotra)
15	DF	NOR	Emil Kalsaas (on loan from Brann)
18	FW	NOR	Ole Kallevåg (from Stord)
22	MF	NOR	Joel Mvuka (promoted from junior squad)
25	DF	NOR	Kristoffer Bidne (from Sotra)
–	DF	NOR	Håvard Foldnes (from Fyllingsdalen)

Out: Note: Flags indicate national team as defined under FIFA eligibility rules; some limited exceptions apply. Players may hold more than one non-FIFA nationality.

No.	Pos.	Nation	Player
5		NOR	Simen Hopsdal (to Fyllingsdalen)
7		NOR	Stefan Aase (to Lysekloster, previously on loan)
9		NOR	August Selnes (to Sandviken, previously on loan to Fyllingsdalen)
14	DF	NOR	Ole Martin Kolskogen (to Brann)
15?		NOR	Lars Alvheim Hauge (released)
27	DF	NOR	Magnus Nybakken Bruun-Hanssen (on loan to (Norway) Sotra)
30	DF	NOR	Daniel Steensæth Tørum (to Sotra)
33	MF	NOR	Nishimwe Beltran Mvuka (released)
–	MF	NOR	Andreas Fantoft (released, previously on loan to Sotra)
–	DF	NOR	Håvard Foldnes (on loan to Sotra)
