= 2014 Strømsgodset Toppfotball season =

Strømsgodset
2014 season
- Chairman: Trond Esaiassen
- Manager: Ronny Deila (-6 June); David Nielsen (7 June-)
- Tippeligaen: 4th
- Norwegian Cup: Third Round vs Tromsdalen
- Champions League: 2nd qualifying round vs Steaua București
- Top goalscorer: League: Péter Kovács (10); All: Péter Kovács (15)
- Highest home attendance: 7,720 (vs Brann); 13 September 2014
- Lowest home attendance: 5,861 (vs Sandnes Ulf); 6 July 2014
- Average home league attendance: 6,708

The 2014 season was Strømsgodset's 8th season in Tippeligaen following their promotion back to the top flight in 2006, and the first as reigning champions since 1971. The club ended in 4th position, securing them a spot in the 2015–16 UEFA Europa League 1st qualification round.

It was Ronny Deila's seventh and last season in charge, as he left on June 6 to become the manager of Celtic F.C. Former Strømsgodset forward David Nielsen, who had started the year as the new assistant manager, took over as interim manager on June 7. He signed the permanent deal, lasting until the end of the 2017-season, on August 6.

In the cup they were knocked out by 2. divisjon side Tromsdalen in the third round, while in the UEFA Champions League qualifications they were knocked out by Steaua București in the 2nd qualifying round.

== Review and events ==
=== Pre-season ===
After winning the 2013 Tippeligaen, only their second league title, Strømsgodset saw some of their most important players leave for other clubs. Their deep-lying midfielder, Stefan Johansen, was sold to Celtic F.C. for a fee of 20 million NOK (£2 million), a club record sale. The two top scoring strikers with 20 league goals combined, Ola Kamara and Adama Diomande, both left the club. Kamara's loan from SV Ried ended, and he signed for Austria Wien, while Diomande was sold from Strømsgodset to Dinamo Minsk for a reported fee of €350,000. Furthermore, box-to-box midfielder Abdisalam Ibrahim, on loan from Manchester City in the 2013 season, signed for Olympiacos. These four players were a large part of the Strømsgodset team in 2013: Only goalkeeper and captain Adam Larsen Kwarasey played more than Johansen and Ibrahim (with 27 matches), while Diomande was involved in 25 matches and Kamara in all 14 league matches (scoring 12 goals) during his loan spell. It was evident that the club had to replace these players if they were to challenge for the title again.

Marius Høibråten, a 19-year-old defender from Lillestrøm had already signed a contract with Strømsgodset in October 2013. He replaced players like Razak Nuhu, whose loan spell from Manchester City ended, and Ole Amund Sveen, who left for Hødd. Two young midfielders, Patrick Olsen and Francisco Júnior, were signed on loan from their respective clubs Inter and Everton. These would replace Ibrahim, and provide depth to the squad in these positions.

Mohammed Abu was the fourth signing, as replacement for Stefan Johansen. The Ghanaian midfielder was highly regarded in Strømsgodset after loan spells from Manchester City in 2010-11 and 2012. However, he had failed to impress on loan spells in other clubs, partly due to injuries. In a move that all parties wanted, Strømsgodset signed the player for a club record fee of approximately NOK 4 million. Coincidentally, Stefan Johansen had been the one to replace Abu after the latter's second loan spell ended.

Strømsgodset hoped that striker Thomas Sørum, who had been injured for most of 2013, would return to form and provide the goals they needed now that Kamara and Diomande had left. They also tried to sign another striker, Marvin Ogunjimi, who scored twice in ten minutes in a friendly match before the season. Internal club discussion at Mallorca made it difficult for Strømsgodset to finalize the deal before the Norwegian transfer window closed. The deal would eventually go through in the summer transfer window.

As for the goalkeeper position, the club knew that club captain Adam Larsen Kwarasey was likely to be called up to the Ghana squad for the 2014 FIFA World Cup, and needed a backup for the Tippeliga matches to be played during the World Cup. Lars Stubhaug, who had served as backup goalkeeper in 2013, had signed for Rosenborg BK,. The four young goalkeepers on the team were believed inexperienced for first team matches. Anders Gundersen was closest, and played reserve team matches in the latter half of 2013, but mistakes during the pre-season friendlies made the club call Sead Ramović out of retirement. The Bosnian 35-year-old was signed as a backup goalkeeper, but claimed he wanted to fight for the first team spot.

Additionally, Danish ex-player David Nielsen was brought in before the season began as the new Assistant Manager. Nielsen, who spent the 2008 season playing as a striker at Strømsgodset, had proven himself by managing Nest-Sotra to promotion to the 2013 1. Divisjon. He was head-hunted by Strømsgodset a replacement for Ronny Deila. In June, when Deila was made Manager with Celtic F.C., the Strømsgodset board would promote him to Manager after having been with the club 6 months.

=== Stadium expansion ===
As champions of the 2013 Tippeliga, Strømsgodset won the Norwegian slot in the 2014–15 UEFA Champions League, entering in the 2nd qualifying round. If they were to be eliminated in the 3rd round or playoff stage, they would enter the 2014–15 UEFA Europa League.

Marienlyst Stadion, as a Category 3 stadium, would not be eligible for the Champions League playoff-rounds (or later stages) or for the Europa League group stage (or later). In order to fulfill the demands of a Category 4 stadium, the stadium mainly needed to be expanded to 8,000 seats. There were also other minor details that needed to be upgraded.

Drammen municipality (the owners of the stadium) and the club decided to rebuild the south end, which was a simple standing terrace. The construction works reduced the capacity of the stadium from about 7,500 to 6,427 after the third home game of the season, until the new end was opened for the match against Vålerenga on 19 July 2014. The south end was rebuilt with a new concrete foundation, and safe standing rail seats. These types of seats were also installed in the central part of the terraces in the north end. Afterwards, the new capacity was 8,935 for league games, or 8,060 for European matches. Roof and toilet facilities were added after the season.

=== Season ===
==== League ====
Strømsgodset started the season well, winning four out of the first five games. This put them at the top of the table after the third round, a position they stayed in until round six, when Molde went ahead. Their first loss was 0-3 away against Vålerenga on May 1. At home they won seven out of the first eight matches, before losing 0-2, also this time against Vålerenga. This put an end to their long streak of 46 undefeated matches at home in the Tippeliga, which was a new record in the league. They stabilized near the top of the table, holding the second position for most rounds. After round 18 of 30, they had 34 points, placing them in the 3rd position, behind Molde and Odd. August and September was, however, disastrous for the team. With only one win, they dropped to 5th in the table, far behind Molde, who went on to secure the league title on 4 October. Strømsgodset finished the season somewhat better, and with a 2-0 win at home versus the champions on 2 Nov, they secured the 4th position and a place in the 2015–16 UEFA Europa League 1st qualification round.

==== Norwegian Cup ====
In the cup, after a solid win in the first round, Strømsgodset again struggled against lower league teams. In the 2nd round, they needed extra time to secure a win over Ørn-Horten. The 3rd round match versus Tromsdalen also had to be decided after extra time, but this time, Strømsgodset lost.

==== Europe ====
The club was unseeded in the 2nd qualifying round and drew the highest-ranked team, Steaua București. The first match was played at home on 16 July, in front of 5,056 spectators. Though Strømsgodset was described as the best team in the match reports, the away team scored the only goal of the match. In the return match, Steaua won 2-0 after two late goals, and the European adventure was over for Strømsgodset.

==== Players ====
One of the most exciting events was the emergence of 15-year-old midfielder Martin Ødegaard. On an amateur contract when the season began, he was eligible to feature in up to three Tippeliga matches for Strømsgodset. He made his debut for Strømsgodset in a match against Aalesund at Marienlyst Stadion on 13 April 2014, becoming the youngest footballer ever to play in the Tippeliga. In the match, he set up the second goal, scoring an assist in his debut. After featuring in the starting line-up against Vålerenga on May 1, and being one of the better players on the pitch, it became clear that the three matches would not be enough for Strømsgodset. He signed a professional contract for 2014 and 2015 with Strømsgodset on 5 May 2014. On 16 May 2014, he scored the fourth goal for Strømsgodset in a home match against Sarpsborg 08 FF which Strømsgodset won 4-1, making him the youngest person to score a goal in the Tippeliga. His major breakthrough happened with the away match against Sandnes Ulf, where he was involved in all three goals of his team, scoring one and having one assist. He was also fouled for a penalty, which was missed by Sørum. After the match, media were discussing his possible debut on the Norway national team This would become a reality the same year. Ødegaard made his international debut for Norway against the United Arab Emirates on 27 August 2014, becoming the youngest debutant for the senior team at the age of 15 years and 253 days. On 13 October 2014, he became the youngest player to feature in a qualifier for the UEFA European Championship.

Another player impressing the fans was Iver Fossum. The box-to-box midfielder, born in 1996, made his debut in the previous season, with four matches as a sub. In 2014, he was one of the most consistent players, starting 10 of the first 17 matches in the league, scoring twice. He also featured in both Champions League qualification games. Despite Strømsgodset signing players on loan from big clubs, it was local youngster Fossum who became the unsung hero.

Striker Thomas Sørum got off to a good start of the season, scoring 43 seconds after being subbed on in the first match. Unfortunately, after six matches and two goals, he was injured again, missing the next four league games and two cup ties. He then played 17 minutes against Rosenborg in the 11th round, scoring 7 minutes after being subbed-on at halftime, before being carried off on a stretcher 10 minutus later with a head injury. He returned in the 17th round, scoring again, but failed to make the team after the arrival of Marvin Ogunjimi.

Unlike the title-winning 2013 season, the two centre backs Jørgen Horn and Kim Andre Madsen spent most of the first half of the season injured. Taking their places were mainly home-grown Lars Sætra and new signing Marius Høibråten from Lillestrøm. Unfortunately for Strømsgodset, Sætra rejected a new contract and left the club in July, signing for Swedish club Hammarby. The talented young centre back from Sogndal, Gustav Valsvik was bought in the summer transfer window to make up for the loss. Furthermore, Jeb Brovsky from New York City FC and Stefan Aškovski from FK Partizan were signed on loan to help cover for the injured defenders. However, both players failed to make an impression on the team.

Another home-grown player left Strømsgodset in the summer; Winger Muhamed Keita was sold to Lech Poznan. To replace him, Bassel Jradi was signed from FC Nordsjælland, but did not play much.

Sead Ramović retired without playing a match, when Anders Gundersen was selected for the first game after Adam Larsen Kwarasey joined the Ghana WC squad. Gundersen played all three league matches during Kwarasey's absence. Without Ramović, and with Hermann Rhodén, Eirik Johannesen and Borger Thomas all out on loan, the club was forced to place 16-year-old Morten Sætra on the bench. He played a friendly against IFK Göteborg in June, but did not play in the league.

== Competitions ==
=== Tippeligaen ===
==== Results summary ====
Overall								Home						Away					
Pld	W	D	L	GF	GA	GD	Pts	W	D	L	GF	GA	GD	W	D	L	GF	GA	GD
30	15	5	10	48	42	+6	50	10	2	3	28	18	+10	5	3	7	20	24	−4

==== Results by round ====
Round	1	2	3	4	5	6	7	8	9	10	11	12	13	14	15	16	17	18	19	20	21	22	23	24	25	26	27	28	29	30
Ground	H	A	H	A	H	A	H	A	H	A	H	H	A	H	A	H	A	H	A	A	H	A	H	A	H	A	H	A	H	A
Result	W	D	W	W	W	L	W	D	W	L	D	W	L	W	W	L	W	D	L	W	L	L	L	W	W	D	W	L	W	L
Position	3	4	1	1	1	3	2	2	2	2	2	2	2	2	2	3	2	3	3	3	3	5	5	5	4	4	4	4	4	4

Updated to match(es) played on 9 November 2014. Source: see below
A = Away; H = Home; W = Win; D = Draw; L = Loss

==== Results ====
30 March 2014 1	Strømsgodset	4–2	Start	Drammen
18:00 CEST (UTC+2)	Wikheim 17', 69'; Francisco Jr. 35'; Sørum 46'	Report	Asante 10', 27'	Stadium: Marienlyst Stadion; Attendance: 6,845; Referee: Svein Oddvar Moen

4 April 2014 2	Viking	0–0	Strømsgodset	Stavanger
19:00 CEST (UTC+2)		Report		Stadium: Viking Stadion; Attendance: 12,090; Referee: Dag Vidar Hafsås

13 April 2014 3	Strømsgodset	2–0	Aalesund	Drammen
18:00 CEST (UTC+2)	Storflor 77'; Sørum 90'	Report		Stadium: Marienlyst Stadion; Attendance: 6,721; Referee: Tore Hansen

21 April 2014 4	Sogndal	1–3	Strømsgodset	Sogndalsfjøra
18:00 CEST (UTC+2)	Hopen 9'	Report	Høibråten 6'; Wikheim 52'; Kovács 79'	Stadium: Fosshaugane Campus; Attendance: 2,875; Referee: Trond Ivar Døvle

27 April 2014 5	Strømsgodset	2–1	Odd	Drammen
15:30 CEST (UTC+2)	Kovács 10'; Sætra 20'	Report	Samuelsen 43'	Stadium: Marienlyst Stadion; Attendance: 6,427; Referee: Per Ivar Staberg

1 May 2014 6	Vålerenga	3–0	Strømsgodset	Oslo
18:00 CEST (UTC+2)	Kjartansson 44', 73' (pen.); Lindkvist 79'	Report		Stadium: Ullevaal Stadion; Attendance: 15,437; Referee: Tommy Skjerven

4 May 2014 7	Strømsgodset	2–0	Bodø/Glimt	Drammen
18:00 CEST (UTC+2)	Fossum 8'; Hamoud 24'	Report		Stadium: Marienlyst Stadion; Attendance: 6,427; Referee: Tom Harald Hagen

11 May 2014 8	Molde	2–2	Strømsgodset	Molde
19:00 CEST (UTC+2)	Elyounoussi 28', 79'	Report	Kovács 66', 90+2'	Stadium: Aker Stadion; Attendance: 10,030; Referee: Svein-Erik Edvartsen

16 May 2014 9	Strømsgodset	4–1	Sarpsborg 08	Drammen
20:05 CEST (UTC+2)	Hamoud 25'; Kovács 45'; Vilsvik 88' (pen.); Ødegaard 90+1'	Report	Kronberg 90+3'	Stadium: Marienlyst Stadion; Attendance: 6,427; Referee: Espen Berntsen

20 May 2014 10	Stabæk	2–1	Strømsgodset	Bærum
20:05 CEST (UTC+2)	Brustad 20'; Boli 67'	Report	Kovács 63'	Stadium: Nadderud Stadion; Attendance: 4,343; Referee: Anders Johansen

24 May 2014 11	Strømsgodset	1–1	Rosenborg	Drammen
18:00 CEST (UTC+2)	Sørum 52'	Report	Bille Nielsen 57'	Stadium: Marienlyst Stadion; Attendance: 6,427; Referee: Ken Henry Johnsen

9 June 2014 12	Strømsgodset	2–1	Haugesund	Drammen
15:30 CEST (UTC+2)	Fossum 33'; Ødegaard 69'	Report	Stølås 8'	Stadium: Marienlyst Stadion; Attendance: 6,312; Referee: Tore Hansen

12 June 2014 13	Lillestrøm	3–0	Strømsgodset	Lillestrøm
19:00 CEST (UTC+2)	Fofana 6'; Knudtzon 35'; Høiland 71'	Report		Stadium: Åråsen Stadion; Attendance: 5,315; Referee: Ken Henry Johnsen

6 July 2014 14	Strømsgodset	1–0	Sandnes Ulf	Drammen
15:30 CEST (UTC+2)	Hamoud 76'	Report		Stadium: Marienlyst Stadion; Attendance: 5,861; Referee: Trygve Kjensli

12 July 2014 15	Brann	0–1	Strømsgodset	Bergen
19:00 CEST (UTC+2)		Report	Kovács 46'	Stadium: Brann Stadion; Attendance: 9,610; Referee: Brage Sandmoen

19 July 2014 16	Strømsgodset	0–2	Vålerenga	Drammen
18:00 CEST (UTC+2)		Report	Zahid 14'; Kjartansson 19'	Stadium: Marienlyst Stadion; Attendance: 7,108; Referee: Svein Oddvar Moen

26 July 2014 17	Sandnes Ulf	1–3	Strømsgodset	Sandnes
18:00 CEST (UTC+2)	Furebotn 19'	Report	Ødegaard 12'; Wikheim 83'; Sørum 84'	Stadium: Sandnes Idrettspark; Attendance: 3,210; Referee: Trond Ivar Døvle

2 August 2014 18	Strømsgodset	1–1	Sogndal	Drammen
15:30 CEST (UTC+2)	Ogunjimi 11'	Report	Söderberg 84'	Stadium: Marienlyst Stadion; Attendance: 7,149; Referee: Anders Johansen

9 August 2014 19	Odd	1–0	Strømsgodset	Skien
18:00 CEST (UTC+2)	Shala 79'	Report		Stadium: Skagerak Arena; Attendance: 8,990; Referee: Trond Ivar Døvle

17 August 2014 20	Start	2–3	Strømsgodset	Kristiansand
19:00 CEST (UTC+2)	Acosta 4'; Asante 88'	Report	Adjei-Boateng 23'; Ogunjimi 38', 67'	Stadium: Sør Arena; Attendance: 6,098; Referee: Brage Sandmoen

23 August 2014 21	Strømsgodset	2–3	Stabæk	Drammen
15:30 CEST (UTC+2)	Vilsvik 71'; Ogunjimi 75'	Report	Hoseth 15'; Boli 29'; Jalasto 55'	Stadium: Marienlyst Stadion; Attendance: 7,077; Referee: Trond Ivar Døvle

30 August 2014 22	Aalesund	2–0	Strømsgodset	Ålesund
18:00 CEST (UTC+2)	Mattila 54' (pen.), 62' (pen.)	Report		Stadium: Color Line Stadion; Attendance: 6,891; Referee: Trygve Kjensli

13 September 2014 23	Strømsgodset	1–4	Brann	Drammen
18:00 CEST (UTC+2)	Kastrati 66'	Report	Pedersen 18'; Skaanes 25'; Askar 47'; Huseklepp 67'	Stadium: Marienlyst Stadion; Attendance: 7,720; Referee: Svein Oddvar Moen

20 September 2014 24	Bodø/Glimt	0–4	Strømsgodset	Bodø
15:30 CEST (UTC+2)		Report	Sørum 4' (pen.), 60'; Fossum 82'; Kastrati 86'	Stadium: Aspmyra Stadion; Attendance: 2,972; Referee: Brage Sandmoen

27 September 2014 25	Strømsgodset	2–1	Viking	Drammen
18:00 CEST (UTC+2)	Adjei-Boateng 37'; Storflor 51'	Report	Landu Landu 41'	Stadium: Marienlyst Stadion; Attendance: 6,179; Referee: Svein-Erik Edvartsen

5 October 2014 26	Sarpsborg 08	0–0	Strømsgodset	Sarpsborg
15:30 CEST (UTC+2)		Report		Stadium: Sarpsborg Stadion; Attendance: 4,080; Referee: Ola Hobber Nilsen

19 October 2014 27	Strømsgodset	2–1	Lillestrøm	Drammen
15:30 CEST (UTC+2)	Ødegaard 21', 41'	Report	Kippe 85'	Stadium: Marienlyst Stadion; Attendance: 7,063; Referee: Tom Harald Hagen

28 October 2014 28	Haugesund	3–2	Strømsgodset	Haugesund
15:30 CET (UTC+1)	Gytkjær 42'; Cvetinović 67'; Bamberg 88'	Report	Kovács 85', 90+2'	Stadium: Haugesund Stadion; Attendance: 5,724; Referee: Per Ivar Staberg

2 November 2014 29	Strømsgodset	2–0	Molde	Drammen
18:00 CET (UTC+1)	Storflor 61', 68'	Report		Stadium: Marienlyst Stadion; Attendance: 6,880; Referee: Anders Johansen

9 November 2014 30	Rosenborg	4–1	Strømsgodset	Trondheim
18:00 CET (UTC+1)	Dorsin 38'; Jensen 77', 86'; Riski 90+2'	Report	Kovács 13'	Stadium: Lerkendal Stadion; Attendance: 17,582; Referee: Tore Hansen

==== Table ====
Pos	Team	Pld	W	D	L	GF	GA	GD	Pts	Qualification or relegation
2	Rosenborg	30	18	6	6	64	43	+21	60	Qualification for the Europa League first qualifying round (Note: Since the winners of the 2014 Norwegian Cup (Molde) qualified for European competition based on their league position, the berth (Europa League first qualifying round) was passed down the league to Strømsgodset.)
3	Odd	30	17	7	6	52	32	+20	58	Qualification for the Europa League first qualifying round
4	Strømsgodset	30	15	5	10	48	42	+6	50	Qualification for the Europa League first qualifying round
5	Lillestrøm	30	13	7	10	49	35	+14	46	
6	Vålerenga	30	11	9	10	59	53	+6	42	

Source: fotball.no
Rules for classification: 1) points; 2) goal difference; 3) number of goals scored.

=== Norwegian Cup ===
24 April 2014 First Round	Drammen	2–10	Strømsgodset	Drammen
18:00 CEST (UTC+2)	Krantz 32', 46'	Report	Lehne Olsen 14', 48', 89', 90+1'; Sørum 22', 43'; Kovács 64', 75', 90+4'; Storflor 80'	Stadium: Marienlyst Stadion; Attendance: 1,200; Referee: Ole-Martin Loeshagen

7 May 2014 Second Round	Ørn-Horten	1–2 (a.e.t.)	Strømsgodset	Horten
18:00 CEST (UTC+2)	Vordahl 42'	Report	Kovács 61', 113'	Stadium: Lystlunden Stadion; Attendance: 615; Referee: Anders Gjermshus

4 June 2014 Third Round	Tromsdalen	4–2 (a.e.t.)	Strømsgodset	Tromsdalen
18:00 CEST (UTC+2)	Sletvold 28'; Råde 92', 116'; Mienna 113'	Report	Lehne Olsen 52'; Ovenstad 115'	Stadium: TUIL Arena; Attendance: 1,089; Referee: Tom Harald Hagen

=== Champions League ===
==== Qualifying rounds ====
16 July 2014 2nd qualifying round 1st leg	Strømsgodset (Norway)	0–1	(Romania) Steaua București	Drammen, Norway
19:30 CEST (UTC+2)		Report	Iancu 49'	Stadium: Marienlyst Stadion; Attendance: 5,056; Referee: Serdar Gözübüyük (Netherlands)

23 July 2014 2nd qualifying round 2nd leg	Steaua București (Romania)	2–0 (3–0 agg.)	(Norway) Strømsgodset	Bucharest, Romania
19:30 CEST (UTC+2)	Râpă 72'; Stanciu 84'	Report		Stadium: Arena Națională; Attendance: 25,000; Referee: Eitan Shemeulevitch (Israel)

== Player details ==
As of 1 December 2014

No.	Pos	Nat	Player	Total		Tippeligaen		Norwegian Cup		Champions League	
No.	Pos	Nat	Player	Apps	Goals	Apps	Goals	Apps	Goals	Apps	Goals
1	GK	(Norway) NOR	Borger Thomas	0	0	0	0	0	0	0	0
2	DF	(Norway) NOR	Mounir Hamoud	27	3	24	3	1	0	2	0
3	DF	(Norway) NOR	Lars Sætra	11	1	9	1	2	0	0	0
3	DF	(United States) USA	Jeb Brovsky	3	0	3	0	0	0	0	0
4	DF	(Norway) NOR	Kim André Madsen	9	0	7	0	2	0	0	0
5	DF	(Norway) NOR	Jørgen Horn	6	0	6	0	0	0	0	0
6	MF	(Norway) NOR	Simen Brenne	1	0	1	0	0	0	0	0
7	FW	(Norway) NOR	Muhamed Keita	7	0	6	0	1	0	0	0
7	FW	(Denmark) DEN	Bassel Jradi	8	0	8	0	0	0	0	0
8	MF	(Portugal) POR	Francisco Júnior	15	1	12	1	1	0	2	0
9	FW	(Norway) NOR	Øyvind Storflor	31	5	26	4	3	1	2	0
10	FW	(Hungary) HUN	Péter Kovács	28	15	24	10	3	5	1	0
11	MF	(Norway) NOR	Martin Rønning Ovenstad	15	1	13	0	2	1	0	0
12	GK	(Ghana) GHA	Adam Larsen Kwarasey	30	0	26	0	2	0	2	0
13	GK	(Norway) NOR	Anders Gundersen	6	0	4	0	2	0	0	0
14	MF	(Norway) NOR	Iver Fossum	30	3	26	3	2	0	2	0
15	FW	(Kosovo) KOS	Flamur Kastrati	21	2	18	2	1	0	2	0
16	MF	(Norway) NOR	Martin Ødegaard	25	5	23	5	1	0	1	0
17	FW	(Norway) NOR	Thomas Lehne Olsen	7	5	4	0	3	5	0	0
18	MF	(Ghana) GHA	Divine Naah	1	0	1	0	0	0	0	0
19	FW	(Norway) NOR	Gustav Wikheim	31	4	27	4	2	0	2	0
20	MF	(Ghana) GHA	Mohammed Abu	32	0	28	0	2	0	2	0
21	MF	(Norway) NOR	Mathias Gjerstrøm	1	0	1	0	0	0	0	0
22	MF	(Ghana) GHA	Bismark Adjei-Boateng	12	2	11	2	1	0	0	0
23	FW	(Norway) NOR	Thomas Sørum	17	8	14	6	1	2	2	0
25	FW	(Norway) NOR	Tokmac Nguen	4	0	3	0	1	0	0	0
26	DF	(Norway) NOR	Lars Christopher Vilsvik	30	2	25	2	3	0	2	0
27	DF	(Norway) NOR	Jarl André Storbæk	27	0	23	0	2	0	2	0
28	DF	(Norway) NOR	Marius Høibråten	21	1	16	1	3	0	2	0
30	GK	(Norway) NOR	Hermann Rhodén	0	0	0	0	0	0	0	0
31	GK	(Norway) NOR	Eirik Johannesen	0	0	0	0	0	0	0	0
34	GK	(Bosnia and Herzegovina) BIH	Sead Ramović	0	0	0	0	0	0	0	0
40	GK	(Norway) NOR	Morten Sætra	0	0	0	0	0	0	0	0
44	DF	(North Macedonia) MKD	Stefan Aškovski	0	0	0	0	0	0	0	0
51	DF	(Norway) NOR	Jørgen Oland	0	0	0	0	0	0	0	0
71	DF	(Norway) NOR	Gustav Valsvik	13	0	13	0	0	0	0	0
75	FW	(Belgium) BEL	Marvin Ogunjimi	13	4	11	4	0	0	2	0
90	MF	(Denmark) DEN	Patrick Olsen	6	0	5	0	1	0	0	0

== Transfers ==
=== Winter ===
In: Note: Flags indicate national team as defined under FIFA eligibility rules; some limited exceptions apply. Players may hold more than one non-FIFA nationality.

No.	Pos.	Nation	Player
—	MF	GHA	Mohammed Abu (from (England) Manchester City)
—	DF	NOR	Marius Høibråten (from (Norway) Lillestrøm)
—	MF	DEN	Patrick Olsen (loan from (Italy) Inter)
—	MF	POR	Francisco Júnior (loan from (England) Everton)
—	GK	BIH	Sead Ramović (from (Denmark) Vendsyssel)

Out: Note: Flags indicate national team as defined under FIFA eligibility rules; some limited exceptions apply. Players may hold more than one non-FIFA nationality.

No.	Pos.	Nation	Player
—	FW	NOR	Adama Diomande (to (Belarus) Dinamo Minsk)
—	MF	NOR	Abdisalam Ibrahim (loan return to (England) Manchester City)
—	MF	NOR	Stefan Johansen (to (Scotland) Celtic)
—	FW	NOR	Ola Kamara (to Austria Wien)
—	DF	GHA	Razak Nuhu (loan return to (England) Manchester City)
—	GK	NOR	Lars Stubhaug (to (Norway) Rosenborg)
—	DF	NOR	Ole Amund Sveen (to (Norway) Hødd)
—	GK	NOR	Borger Thomas (loan to (Norway) Stabæk)
—	GK	NOR	Hermann Rhodén (loan to (Norway) Drammen)
—	GK	NOR	Eirik Johannesen (loan to (Norway) Åssiden)

=== Summer ===
In: Note: Flags indicate national team as defined under FIFA eligibility rules; some limited exceptions apply. Players may hold more than one non-FIFA nationality.

No.	Pos.	Nation	Player
3	DF	USA	Jeb Brovsky (on loan from (United States) New York City FC)
75	FW	BEL	Marvin Ogunjimi (from (Spain) Mallorca)
71	DF	NOR	Gustav Valsvik (from (Norway) Sogndal)
7	MF	DEN	Bassel Jradi (from (Denmark) Nordsjælland)
44	DF	MKD	Stefan Aškovski (on loan from (Serbia) Partizan)
18	MF	GHA	Divine Naah (on loan from (Ghana) Right To Dream Academy)

Out: Note: Flags indicate national team as defined under FIFA eligibility rules; some limited exceptions apply. Players may hold more than one non-FIFA nationality.

No.	Pos.	Nation	Player
3	DF	NOR	Lars Sætra (to (Sweden) Hammarby)
7	FW	NOR	Muhamed Keita (to (Poland) Lech Poznan)
34	GK	BIH	Sead Ramović (resigned)
17	FW	NOR	Thomas Lehne Olsen (on loan to (Norway) Ull/Kisa)
25	MF	NOR	Tokmac Nguen (on loan to (Norway) Bærum)

== Team kit ==
The official kit manufacturer for Strømsgodset is Diadora. This is the fourth year of the five-year-deal from 2011. The home shirt is deep blue, while the shorts and socks are white. The away kit has the reverse colours, with a white shirt and deep blue shorts and socks.

The club started the 2014 season without a main sponsor, but signed a major two-year deal with the nationwide bank DNB in June. The deal may be extended for another two years if both parts are willing.

2014 home colours	2014 away colours

== See also ==
Associated Wikipedia articles

- 2014 in Norwegian football
