= 2018 Strømsgodset Toppfotball season =

Strømsgodset
2018 season
- President: Trond Esaiassen
- Manager: Tor Ole Skullerud
- Stadium: Marienlyst Stadion
- Eliteserien: 13th
- Norwegian Cup: Runners-up
- Top goalscorer: League: Mustafa Abdellaoue (7); All: Mustafa Abdellaoue (15)
Home colours	Away colours

The 2018 season was Strømsgodset's twelfth season back in Eliteserien since their promotion in the 2006 season.

== Squad ==
As of 31 August 2018

Note: Flags indicate national team as defined under FIFA eligibility rules; some limited exceptions apply. Players may hold more than one non-FIFA nationality.

No.	Pos.	Nation	Player
1	GK	NOR	Espen Bugge Pettersen
2	DF	NOR	Mounir Hamoud
3	DF	NOR	Jonathan Parr
4	DF	NOR	Kim André Madsen
5	DF	NOR	Jakob Glesnes
6	MF	NOR	Henning Hauger
7	MF	NOR	Herman Stengel
8	MF	NOR	Johan Hove
9	FW	NOR	Sebastian Pedersen
10	FW	NOR	Marcus Pedersen
11	FW	NOR	Kristoffer Tokstad
17	DF	NOR	Christoffer Lindquist
18	MF	NOR	Martin Rønning Ovenstad
19	MF	GNB	Francisco Júnior

No.	Pos.	Nation	Player
20	GK	NOR	Pål Vestly Heigre
23	FW	NOR	Eirik Ulland Andersen
25	DF	NOR	Stian Ringstad
26	DF	NOR	Lars Christopher Vilsvik
28	DF	NOR	Marius Høibråten
30	FW	NOR	Mustafa Abdellaoue
35	DF	ISL	Arnar Thor Gudjonsson
36	MF	NOR	Hasan Duman
39	DF	NOR	Lars Sætra
40	GK	NOR	Morten Sætra
53	GK	NOR	Matias Finnestrand
63	FW	NOR	Magnus Lankhof-Dahlby
90	FW	NOR	Amahl Pellegrino
93	MF	NOR	Tokmac Nguen

=== Out on loan ===
Note: Flags indicate national team as defined under FIFA eligibility rules; some limited exceptions apply. Players may hold more than one non-FIFA nationality.

No.	Pos.	Nation	Player
21	MF	NOR	Mathias Gjerstrøm (at Notodden)
25	DF	NOR	Stian Ringstad (at Sandefjord)

No.	Pos.	Nation	Player
63	FW	NOR	Magnus Lankhof-Dahlby (at Grorud)

== Transfers ==
=== Winter ===
In: Note: Flags indicate national team as defined under FIFA eligibility rules; some limited exceptions apply. Players may hold more than one non-FIFA nationality.

No.	Pos.	Nation	Player
7	MF	NOR	Herman Stengel (from (Norway) Vålerenga)
17	DF	NOR	Christopher Lindquist (loan return from (Norway) Florø)
30	FW	NOR	Mustafa Abdellaoue (from (Norway) Aalesund)
39	DF	NOR	Lars Sætra (from (China) Baoding Rongda)
90	FW	NOR	Amahl Pellegrino (from (Norway) Mjøndalen)
—	FW	NOR	Sebastian Pedersen (from (Norway) Stabæk)

Out: Note: Flags indicate national team as defined under FIFA eligibility rules; some limited exceptions apply. Players may hold more than one non-FIFA nationality.

No.	Pos.	Nation	Player
9	FW	SWE	Pontus Engblom (to (Norway) Sandefjord)
13	MF	SWE	Christian Rubio Sivodedov (on loan to (Sweden) GIF Sundsvall)
18	DF	NOR	Henrik Bredeli (to (Norway) Fram Larvik, previously on loan at (Norway) Fredrikstad)
33	FW	NGA	Marco Tagbajumi (to (Republic of Ireland) Dundalk, previously on loan at (Norway) Lillestrøm)
34	FW	NOR	Abdul-Basit Agouda (to (Norway) Stabæk)
40	GK	NOR	Morten Sætra (on loan to (Norway) Elverum, previously on loan at (Norway) Nybergsund-Trysil)
54	MF	NOR	Knut Ahlander (on loan to (Norway) Asker)
66	MF	NOR	Andreas Hoven (on loan to (Norway) Notodden)
—	FW	NOR	Sebastian Pedersen (on loan to (Norway) Strømmen)

=== Summer ===
In: Note: Flags indicate national team as defined under FIFA eligibility rules; some limited exceptions apply. Players may hold more than one non-FIFA nationality.

No.	Pos.	Nation	Player
8	MF	NOR	Johan Hove (from (Norway) Sogndal)
9	FW	NOR	Sebastian Pedersen (loan return from (Norway) Strømmen)
40	GK	NOR	Morten Sætra (loan return from (Norway) Elverum)
66	MF	NOR	Andreas Hoven (loan return from (Norway) Notodden)
—	MF	NOR	Johan Hove (from (Norway) Sogndal)

Out: Note: Flags indicate national team as defined under FIFA eligibility rules; some limited exceptions apply. Players may hold more than one non-FIFA nationality.

No.	Pos.	Nation	Player
8	MF	LBN	Bassel Jradi (to (Croatia) Hajduk Split)
13	MF	SWE	Christian Rubio Sivodedov (to (Sweden) GIF Sundsvall, previously on loan)
21	MF	NOR	Mathias Gjerstrøm (on loan to (Norway) Notodden)
25	DF	NOR	Stian Ringstad (on loan to (Norway) Sandefjord)
28	DF	NOR	Marius Høibråten (to (Norway) Sandefjord)
54	MF	NOR	Knut Ahlander (to (United States) SMU Mustangs, previously on loan at (Norway) Asker)
63	FW	NOR	Magnus Lankhof-Dahlby (on loan to (Norway) Grorud)
—	MF	BIH	Adis Mujkić (to (Italy) Catania)

== Competitions ==
=== Eliteserien ===
==== Results summary ====
Overall								Home						Away					
Pld	W	D	L	GF	GA	GD	Pts	W	D	L	GF	GA	GD	W	D	L	GF	GA	GD
30	7	10	13	46	48	−2	31	5	4	6	26	19	+7	2	6	7	20	29	−9

Last updated: 24 November 2018.
Source: see below

==== Results by round ====
Round	1	2	3	4	5	6	7	8	9	10	11	12	13	14	15	16	17	18	19	20	21	22	23	24	25	26	27	28	29	30
Ground	H	H	A	A	H	A	H	A	H	A	A	H	A	H	A	H	H	A	H	A	H	A	H	A	H	A	H	A	H	A
Result	D	D	W	L	W	L	L	D	L	L	L	W	D	W	D	L	W	D	D	L	L	D	L	W	L	L	W	L	D	D
Position	8	11	7	9	5	8	10	11	12	12	13	12	12	11	11	11	11	11	11	12	12	12	12	12	12	14	11	12	12	13

Updated to match(es) played on 24 November 2018. Source: see below
A = Away; H = Home; W = Win; D = Draw; L = Loss

==== Results ====
11 March 2018 1	Strømsgodset	2–2	Stabæk	Drammen
18:00 CET (UTC+1)	Pedersen 1', 51'	Report	Boli 3' (yellow card) 14'; Omoijuanfo 45'; Vetlesen (yellow card) 50'; Ovenstad (yellow card) 55'; Sæter (yellow card) 76'	Stadium: Marienlyst Stadion; Attendance: 5,199; Referee: Kai Erik Steen

2 April 2018 3	Strømsgodset	1–1	Brann	Drammen
18:00 CEST (UTC+2)	Acosta 76' (o.g.)	Report	Johansen (yellow card) 84'; Barmen 88'	Stadium: Marienlyst Stadion; Attendance: 5,873; Referee: Svein Oddvar Moen

7 April 2018 4	Vålerenga	1–4	Strømsgodset	Oslo
18:00 CEST (UTC+2)	Näsberg (yellow card) 21'; Ejuke 45+1'; Kwarasey (yellow card) 64'	Report	Pedersen 26', 65' (pen.); Nguen 48'; Stengel 90+6'	Stadium: Intility Arena; Attendance: 9,304; Referee: Tommy Skjerven

11 April 2018 2	Tromsø	3–1	Strømsgodset	Tromsø
18:30 CEST (UTC+2)	Espejord 7'; Antonsen 35'; Berntsen 69'	Report	Jradi (yellow card) 33'; Stengel (yellow card) 72'; Pellegrino 79'	Stadium: Alfheim Stadion; Attendance: 2,908; Referee: Tom Harald Hagen

15 April 2018 5	Strømsgodset	3–0	Odd	Drammen
18:00 CEST (UTC+2)	Glesnes (yellow card) 48'; Pedersen 61', 71', 76'; Júnior (yellow card) 84'	Report	Hoff (yellow card) 27'; Samuelsen (yellow card) 43'; Risa (yellow card) 83'	Stadium: Marienlyst Stadion; Attendance: 5,588; Referee: Kristoffer Hagenes

22 April 2018 6	Haugesund	1–0	Strømsgodset	Haugesund
18:00 CEST (UTC+2)	Kallevåg 19'	Report	Júnior (yellow card) 34'; Pedersen (yellow card) 53'; Ringstad (yellow card) 61'	Stadium: Haugesund Stadion; Attendance: 3,690; Referee: Ola Hobber Nilsen

29 April 2018 7	Strømsgodset	0–1	Rosenborg	Drammen
20:00 CEST (UTC+2)	Pedersen (yellow card) 66'; Stengel (yellow card) 90'	Report	Jensen 33'; Søderlund (yellow card) 55'	Stadium: Marienlyst Stadion; Attendance: 7,587; Referee: Espen Eskås

6 May 2018 8	Bodø/Glimt	2–2	Strømsgodset	Bodø
18:00 CEST (UTC+2)	Opseth 1'; Bjørnbak 63'	Report	Andersen (yellow card) 21'; Parr 45+5'; Lindquist (yellow card) 47'; Pedersen 82' (pen.)	Stadium: Aspmyra Stadion; Attendance: 2,834; Referee: Tommy Skjerven

13 May 2018 9	Strømsgodset	1–2	Sarpsborg 08	Drammen
18:00 CEST (UTC+2)	Falch 7' (o.g.); Andersen (yellow card) 54'	Report	Halvorsen (yellow card) 29' (goal) 64' (pen.); Muhammed (yellow card) 36'; Schwartz 79'; Askar (yellow card) 90+5'	Stadium: Marienlyst Stadion; Attendance: 5,875; Referee: Dag Vidar Hafsås

16 May 2018 10	Molde	2–0	Strømsgodset	Molde
18:00 CEST (UTC+2)	Gabrielsen 56' (yellow card) 70'; Moström (yellow card) 59'; Hestad 79'	Report	Pedersen (yellow card) 66'	Stadium: Aker Stadion; Attendance: 6,770; Referee: Trond Ivar Døvle

21 May 2018 11	Kristiansund	4–0	Strømsgodset	Kristiansund
18:00 CEST (UTC+2)	Parr 10' (o.g.); Kalludra 23'; Tokstad 45' (o.g.); Baranov (yellow card) 63'; D.Ulvestad 82'; Lepistu (yellow card) 83'	Report	Nguen (yellow card) 83'	Stadium: Kristiansund Stadion; Attendance: 3,886; Referee: Trygve Kjensli

27 May 2018 12	Strømsgodset	2–0	Sandefjord	Drammen
18:00 CEST (UTC+2)	Pedersen 45'; Pellegrino 83' (yellow card) 83'; Nguen (yellow card) 84'	Report	Grorud (yellow card) 46'	Stadium: Marienlyst Stadion; Attendance: 6,110; Referee: Ola Hobber Nilsen

10 June 2018 13	Start	1–1	Strømsgodset	Kristiansand
18:00 CEST (UTC+2)	Børufsen 18'; Sigurðarson (yellow card) 81'	Report	Pedersen 52'; Nguen (yellow card) 54' (yellow-red card) 86'	Stadium: Sør Arena; Attendance: 4,602; Referee: Espen Eskås

24 June 2018 14	Strømsgodset	3–0	Ranheim	Drammen
18:00 CEST (UTC+2)	Pedersen 9'; Jradi 42'; Andersen 64'; Júnior (yellow card) 65'	Report		Stadium: Marienlyst Stadion; Attendance: 5,431; Referee: Tore Hansen

2 July 2018 15	Lillestrøm	1–1	Strømsgodset	Lillestrøm
18:00 CEST (UTC+2)	Olsen 90+7'	Report	Jradi 35'; Pedersen (yellow card) 69'	Stadium: Åråsen Stadion; Attendance: 4,842; Referee: Dag Vidar Hafsås

9 July 2018 16	Strømsgodset	2–3	Kristiansund	Drammen
19:00 CEST (UTC+2)	Nguen 6'; Júnior (yellow card) 34'; Andersen 57'; Jradi (yellow card) 71'	Report	Bye 21', 24', 31'; Sørmo (yellow card) 55'; Coly (yellow card) 71'; McDermott (yellow card) 71'	Stadium: Marienlyst Stadion; Attendance: 5,496; Referee: Ola Hobber Nilsen

5 August 2018 17	Strømsgodset	4–0	Bodø/Glimt	Drammen
18:00 CEST (UTC+2)	Pedersen 14' (pen.), 74' (yellow card) 50'; Nguen 61'; Sætra 65'	Report		Stadium: Marienlyst Stadion; Attendance: 5,433; Referee: Ola Hobber Nilsen

12 August 2018 18	Odd	2–2	Strømsgodset	Skien
20:00 CEST (UTC+2)	Ruud 12'; Børven 30'; Rashani (yellow card) 52'; Risa (yellow card) 69'	Report	Andersen (yellow card) 17'; Tokstad 50'; Vilsvik (yellow card) 52'; Hauger (yellow card) 60'; Pedersen 81'	Stadium: Skagerak Arena; Attendance: 5,163; Referee: Trygve Kjensli

19 August 2018 19	Strømsgodset	1–1	Start	Drammen
18:00 CEST (UTC+2)	Tokstad (yellow card) 12'; Glesnes 80'	Report	Afeez (yellow card) 31'; Kabran 32'; Deumeland (yellow card) 45'	Stadium: Marienlyst Stadion; Attendance: 5,992; Referee: Kristoffer Hagenes

26 August 2018 20	Rosenborg	4–3	Strømsgodset	Trondheim
18:00 CEST (UTC+2)	Jebali 22'; Meling 40'; Bendtner 50'; Jensen 65'	Report	Mos 43'; Nguen 59'; Sætra (yellow card) 77'; Hansen 84' (o.g.)	Stadium: Lerkendal Stadion; Attendance: 16,519; Referee: Ola Hobber Nilsen

1 September 2018 21	Strømsgodset	2–4	Tromsø	Drammen
15:30 CEST (UTC+2)	Andersen 22', 50'; Nguen (yellow card) 61'; Glesnes (yellow card) 68'; Tokstad (yellow card) 90+4'	Report	Ingebrigtsen 29'; Taylor 36' (pen.); Gundersen 63'; Valakari 78'; Åsen (yellow card) 90+6'	Stadium: Marienlyst Stadion; Attendance: 5,463; Referee: Sigurd Smehus Kringstad

16 September 2018 22	Ranheim	1–1	Strømsgodset	Trondheim
18:00 CEST (UTC+2)	Helmersen 28'	Report	Glesnes (yellow card) 33'; Pellegrino (yellow card) 88'; Nguen 90+2'	Stadium: EXTRA Arena; Attendance: 1,582; Referee: Kai Erik Steen

23 September 2018 23	Strømsgodset	1–2	Molde	Drammen
18:00 CEST (UTC+2)	Ovenstad (yellow card) 18'; Nguen 21'; Pedersen (yellow card) 90+3'	Report	Haaland 11'; Hestad 17'; Sarr (yellow card) 51'	Stadium: Marienlyst Stadion; Attendance: 7,084; Referee: Espen Eskås

30 September 2018 24	Sarpsborg 08	0–1	Strømsgodset	Sarpsborg
18:00 CEST (UTC+2)	Halvorsen (yellow card) 45'	Report	Sætra (yellow card) 15'; Mos 45' (pen.)	Stadium: Sarpsborg Stadion; Attendance: 4,481; Referee: Kristoffer Hagenes

6 October 2018 25	Strømsgodset	0–1	Haugesund	Drammen
18:00 CEST (UTC+2)		Report	Leite (yellow card) 24'; Wadji 77'	Stadium: Marienlyst Stadion; Attendance: 5,477; Referee: Tore Hansen

20 October 2018 26	Sandefjord	2–1	Strømsgodset	Sandefjord
18:00 CEST (UTC+2)	Ofkir 4'; Rufo 74'	Report	Andersen 79'; Stengel (yellow card) 87'	Stadium: Komplett Arena; Attendance: 2,545; Referee: Ola Hobber Nilsen

27 October 2018 27	Strømsgodset	2–0	Vålerenga	Drammen
18:00 CEST (UTC+2)	Hauger (yellow card) 54'; Nguen 56'; Andersen 70'	Report	Tollås (yellow card) 18'; Grødem (yellow card) 78'	Stadium: Marienlyst Stadion; Attendance: 6,855; Referee: Tommy Skjerven

4 November 2018 28	Brann	3–1	Strømsgodset	Bergen
20:00 CET (UTC+1)	Haugen 2'; Rismark 56'; Rólantsson 59'; Koomson (yellow card) 90+3'	Report	Nguen (yellow card) 74'; Mos 89'	Stadium: Brann Stadion; Attendance: 8,887; Referee: Tore Hansen

11 November 2018 29	Strømsgodset	2–2	Lillestrøm	Drammen
18:00 CET (UTC+1)	Mos 20', 52'	Report	Olsen 31'; Brenden (yellow card) 81'; Kippe 89'	Stadium: Marienlyst Stadion; Attendance: 5,695; Referee: Dag Vidar Hafsås

24 November 2018 30	Stabæk	2–2	Strømsgodset	Bærum
18:00 CET (UTC+1)	Boli 17' (pen.) (yellow card) 86'; Keita 54'	Report	Mos 32', 90+3'	Stadium: Nadderud Stadion; Attendance: 4,938; Referee: Tom Harald Hagen

==== Table ====
Pos	Team	Pld	W	D	L	GF	GA	GD	Pts	Qualification or relegation
11	Bodø/Glimt	30	6	14	10	32	35	−3	32	
12	Lillestrøm	30	7	11	12	34	44	−10	32	
13	Strømsgodset	30	7	10	13	46	48	−2	31	
14	Stabæk (O)	30	6	11	13	37	50	−13	29	Qualification for the relegation play-offs
15	Start (R)	30	8	5	17	30	54	−24	29	Relegation to First Division

Source: Football Association of Norway (in Norwegian), Soccerway
Rules for classification: 1) Points; 2) Goal difference; 3) Goals scored; 4) Head-to-head points; 5) Head-to-head goal difference; 6) Head-to-head away goals scored (only if between two teams); 7) Head-to-head goals scored; 8) Play-off (only used to decide champions or relegation).
(O) Play-off winners; (R) Relegated

=== Norwegian Cup ===
18 April 2018 First Round	Vestfossen	1–4	Strømsgodset	Vestfossen
18:00 CEST (UTC+2)	Hichem Bekkaoui (yellow card) 54'; A.Torgersen 62'	Report	Mos 8', 54'; Pellegrino 58'; Sætra (yellow card) 71'; Andersen 79'	Stadium: Strandajordet kunstgress Attendance: 850; Referee: Mohammad Usman Aslam

2 May2018 Second Round	Valdres	1–3	Strømsgodset	Fagernes
18:00 CEST (UTC+2)	S.Høglien 71'	Report	Tokstad 31'; Pellegrino 76'; Jradi 83'	Stadium: Blåbærmyra; Attendance: 823; Referee: Harald Røvig Sletner

9 May 2018 Third Round	Bærum	0–3	Strømsgodset	Sandvika
18:00 CEST (UTC+2)		Report	Parr (yellow card) 45'; M.Lyngen 51' (o.g.); Mos 59'; Andersen 63'	Stadium: Kadettangen; Attendance: 500; Referee: Steinar Hauge

14 June 2018 Fourth Round	Strømsgodset	2–0	Ranheim	Drammen
18:00 CEST (UTC+2)	Andersen 57'; Parr (yellow card) 89'; Jradi 90+2'	Report		Stadium: Marienlyst Stadion; Attendance: 2,863; Referee: Trond Ivar Døvle

26 September 2018 Quarterfinal	Haugesund	0–1	Strømsgodset	Haugesund
18:00 CEST (UTC+2)	Stølås (yellow card) 55'; Tronstad (yellow card) 90+2'	Report	Mos 16'; Pellegrino (yellow card) 55'; Hauger (yellow card) 76'; Júnior (yellow card) 80'; Vilsvik (yellow card) 87'	Stadium: Haugesund Stadion; Attendance: 2,921; Referee: Trond Ivar Døvle

31 October 2018 Semifinal	Strømsgodset	3–0	Lillestrøm	Drammen
20:00 CET (UTC+1)	Mos 49', 52' (pen.), 83'	Report	Knudtzon (yellow card) 88'	Stadium: Marienlyst Stadion; Attendance: 5,765; Referee: Tom Harald Hagen

==== Final ====
2 December 2018	Rosenborg	4–1	Strømsgodset	Oslo
14:15 CEST (UTC+2)	Jensen 18'; Konradsen 39'; Helland (yellow card) 43'; Bendtner 52', 90'; Hedenstad (yellow card) 62'	Report	Mos 13'	Stadium: Ullevaal Stadion; Attendance: 22,182; Referee: Trond Ivar Døvle

== Squad statistics ==
As of match played 24 November 2018

=== Appearances and goals ===
No.	Pos	Nat	Player	Total		Eliteserien		Norwegian Cup	
No.	Pos	Nat	Player	Apps	Goals	Apps	Goals	Apps	Goals
1	GK	(Norway) NOR	Espen Bugge Pettersen	25	0	22	0	3	0
2	DF	(Norway) NOR	Mounir Hamoud	12	0	6+2	0	3+1	0
3	DF	(Norway) NOR	Jonathan Parr	31	1	27	1	4	0
4	DF	(Norway) NOR	Kim André Madsen	3	0	2	0	1	0
5	DF	(Norway) NOR	Jakob Glesnes	35	1	30	1	5	0
6	MF	(Norway) NOR	Henning Hauger	30	0	24+2	0	4	0
7	MF	(Norway) NOR	Herman Stengel	30	1	18+7	1	3+2	0
8	MF	(Norway) NOR	Johan Hove	5	0	1+4	0	0	0
9	FW	(Norway) NOR	Sebastian Pedersen	1	0	0	0	0+1	0
10	FW	(Norway) NOR	Marcus Pedersen	25	14	22+1	14	1+1	0
11	FW	(Norway) NOR	Kristoffer Tokstad	20	2	10+4	1	2+4	1
17	DF	(Norway) NOR	Christoffer Lindquist	12	0	7	0	4+1	0
18	MF	(Norway) NOR	Martin Rønning Ovenstad	6	0	2+3	0	0+1	0
19	MF	(Guinea-Bissau) GNB	Francisco Júnior	22	0	14+4	0	4	0
20	GK	(Norway) NOR	Pål Vestly Heigre	2	0	1	0	1	0
21	MF	(Norway) NOR	Mathias Gjerstrøm	1	0	0+1	0	0	0
23	FW	(Norway) NOR	Eirik Ulland Andersen	34	9	28	6	5+1	3
26	DF	(Norway) NOR	Lars Christopher Vilsvik	24	0	22	0	2	0
28	DF	(Norway) NOR	Marius Høibråten	13	0	11+2	0	0	0
30	FW	(Norway) NOR	Mustafa Abdellaoue	30	14	10+14	7	6	7
35	DF	(Iceland) ISL	Arnar Thor Gudjonsson	1	0	0	0	0+1	0
36	MF	(Norway) NOR	Hasan Duman	3	0	0+3	0	0	0
39	DF	(Norway) NOR	Lars Sætra	22	1	12+6	1	4	0
40	GK	(Norway) NOR	Morten Sætra	9	0	7	0	2	0
66	MF	(Norway) NOR	Andreas Hoven	2	0	0+2	0	0	0
90	FW	(Norway) NOR	Amahl Pellegrino	31	4	19+6	2	4+2	2
93	MF	(Norway) NOR	Tokmac Nguen	32	7	25+3	7	4	0
Players away from Strømsgodset on loan:
25	DF	(Norway) NOR	Stian Ringstad	5	0	3	0	2	0
63	FW	(Norway) NOR	Magnus Lankhof-Dahlby	2	0	0	0	0+2	0
Players who left Strømsgodset during the season:
8	MF	(Lebanon) LBN	Bassel Jradi	18	4	15+1	2	2	2

=== Goal scorers ===
Place	Position	Nation	Number	Name	Eliteserien	Norwegian Cup	Total
1	FW	(Norway)	10	Marcus Pedersen	14	0	14
1	FW	(Norway)	30	Mustafa Abdellaoue	7	7	14
3	FW	(Norway)	23	Eirik Ulland Andersen	6	3	9
4	MF	(Norway)	93	Tokmac Nguen	7	0	7
5	FW	(Norway)	90	Amahl Pellegrino	2	2	4
5	MF	(Lebanon)	8	Bassel Jradi	2	2	4
5				Own goal	3	1	4
8	FW	(Norway)	11	Kristoffer Tokstad	1	1	2
9	MF	(Norway)	7	Herman Stengel	1	0	1
9	DF	(Norway)	3	Jonathan Parr	1	0	1
9	DF	(Norway)	39	Lars Sætra	1	0	1
9	DF	(Norway)	5	Jakob Glesnes	1	0	1
				TOTALS	46	16	62

=== Disciplinary record ===
Number	Nation	Position	Name	Eliteserien		Norwegian Cup		Total	
Number	Nation	Position	Name	Booked	Sent off (straight red)	Booked	Sent off (straight red)	Booked	Sent off (straight red)
3	(Norway)	DF	Jonathan Parr	0	0	2	0	2	0
5	(Norway)	DF	Jakob Glesnes	3	0	0	0	3	0
6	(Norway)	MF	Henning Hauger	2	0	1	0	3	0
7	(Norway)	MF	Herman Stengel	3	0	0	0	3	0
11	(Norway)	FWF	Kristoffer Tokstad	2	0	0	0	2	0
10	(Norway)	FW	Marcus Pedersen	6	0	0	0	6	0
17	(Norway)	DF	Christoffer Lindquist	1	0	0	0	1	0
18	(Norway)	MF	Martin Rønning Ovenstad	1	0	0	0	1	0
19	(Guinea-Bissau)	MF	Francisco Júnior	4	0	1	0	5	0
23	(Norway)	FW	Eirik Ulland Andersen	3	0	0	0	3	0
26	(Norway)	DF	Lars Christopher Vilsvik	1	0	1	0	2	0
39	(Norway)	DF	Lars Sætra	2	0	1	0	3	0
90	(Norway)	FW	Amahl Pellegrino	2	0	1	0	3	0
93	(Norway)	MF	Tokmac Nguen	6	1	0	0	6	1
Players away from Strømsgodset on loan:
25	(Norway)	DF	Stian Ringstad	1	0	0	0	1	0
Players who left Strømsgodset during the season:
8	(Lebanon)	MF	Bassel Jradi	2	0	0	0	2	0
			TOTALS	39	1	7	0	46	1
