= Hermann Rhodén =

Norwegian footballer (born 1993)

Personal information
- Full name: Hermann Rhodén
- Date of birth: 22 April 1993 (age 33)
- Place of birth: Drammen, Norway
- Height: 1.84 m (6 ft 1/2 in)
- Position: Goalkeeper

Team information
- Current team: Grorud

Youth career
- Birkebeineren
- –2011: Strømsgodset

Senior career*
Years	Team	Apps	(Gls)
2011–2014	Strømsgodset	1	(0)
2012	→ Vestfossen IF	19	(0)
2013	→ Stoppen FK	0	(0)
2014	→ Drammen FK	12	(0)
2015	Drammen FK	0	(0)
2016–	Grorud		
Medal record
Gold medal – first place	Tippeligaen	2013
- * Club domestic league appearances and goals as of 9:56, 1 August 2014 (UTC) ‡ National team caps and goals as of 9:56, 1 August 2014 (UTC)

Hermann Rhodén (born 22 April 1993) is a Norwegian former professional footballer who plays as a goalkeeper for Grorud IL in the 2. divisjon.

== Playing career ==
=== Club ===
Rhodén was born in Drammen, and grew up in Krokstadelva. He spent his youth years in local club Birkebeineren, before signing with Strømsgodset's youth team.

Rhodén got his first team Tippeliga debut for Strømsgodset in the away match against Start on 3 April 2011. Without a professional contract at the time, Rhodén was included in the squad due to injuries, and when Adam Larsen Kwarasey was sent off in the 9th minute, he had to step up. Although his team lost 1–5, the goalkeeper was praised for his debut.

He spent the 2012 season on loan to Third Division side Vestfossen IF.

He signed a professional contract with Strømsgodset on 4 April 2013, lasting until the end of the 2014 season.

Rhodén was the backup goalkeeper for the first half of the title-winning 2013 season, but did not feature in any matches. He played for the reserve team in the Norwegian 2nd Division, before being sent on loan to local 3rd Division team Stoppen SK for the second half of the season.

In 2014, he signed for 2. divisjon club Drammen FK on a season-long loan. The loan deal was made permanent after the 2014 season.

Rhodén is also known in Norway from the NRK reality show "Nummer 1 - Norges største keepertalent", where former Norwegian internationals Frode Grodås and Stig Inge Bjørnebye searched for the best goalkeeper talent in Norway between the ages 15 and 17. In the show, which was aired in 2011, Rhodén came third.

== Career statistics ==
As of match played 30 July 2014

Club	Season	League			Cup		Total	
Club	Season	Division	Apps	Goals	Apps	Goals	Apps	Goals
Strømsgodset	2011	Tippeligaen	1	0	0	0	1	0
Vestfossen IF	2012	3rd Division	19	0	0	0	0	0
Strømsgodset	2013	Tippeligaen	0	0	0	0	0	0
Stoppen SK	2013	3rd Division	0	0	0	0	0	0
Drammen FK	2014	3rd Division	12	0	1	0	13	0
Total			32	0	1	0	33	0

== Honours ==
=== Club ===
Strømsgodset

- Tippeligaen (1): 2013
