= Clement Twizere Buhake =

Rwandan footballer (born 1996)

Personal information
- Date of birth: 9 July 1996 (age 30)
- Place of birth: Norway
- Position: Goalkeeper

Team information
- Current team: Ull/Kisa
- Number: 1

Youth career
- –2011: Norild
- 2014–2015: Lillestrøm

Senior career*
| Years | Team | Apps | (Gls) |
| 2012–2014 | Norild | 36 | (0) |
| 2015 | Lillestrøm 2 | 2 | (0) |
| 2016–2018 | Oppsal | 25 | (0) |
| 2016–2018 | → Oppsal 2 | 20 | (0) |
| 2019 | Gjelleråsen | 7 | (0) |
| 2019 | → Gjelleråsen 2 | 6 | (0) |
| 2020–2023 | Strømmen | 51 | (0) |
| 2024– | Ull/Kisa | 43 | (0) |

International career^{‡}
| 2021– | Rwanda | 2 | (0) |
- * Club domestic league appearances and goals as of 3 November 2025 ‡ National team caps and goals as of 19 November 2024

Clement Twizere Buhake (born 9 July 1996) is a Rwandan footballer who plays as a goalkeeper for Ull/Kisa. He has been capped for the Rwanda national team.

== Professional career ==
Twizere Buhake made his senior debut with Strømmen in a 3–1 Norwegian First Division win over Ullensaker/Kisa IL on 21 November 2020. He became their first-choice goalkeeper in 2022. Buhake was signed by Ull/Kisa ahead of the 2024 season.

== International career ==
Twizere Buhake was called up to the Rwanda national team for a set of friendlies in June 2021. He debuted for Rwanda in a 2–0 friendly win over the Central African Republic on 3 June 2021.
