= Hasan Duman =

Norwegian footballer (born 1999)

Personal information
- Full name: Hasan Hüseyin Duman
- Date of birth: 12 April 1999 (age 27)
- Height: 1.80 m (5 ft 11 in)
- Position: Midfielder

Team information
- Current team: Åskollen
- Number: 64

Youth career
- 2011: Marienlyst
- 2012–2017: Strømsgodset

Senior career*
Years	Team	Apps	(Gls)
2018–2019	Strømsgodset	3	(0)
2020	Åssiden	0	(0)
2020	Fredrikstad	7	(0)
2021	Åssiden	10	(1)
2022–	Åskollen	21	(4)

International career
2014	Norway U15	2	(0)
2015	Norway U16	13	(0)
2016	Norway U17	5	(1)
2017	Norway U18	6	(0)
2018	Norway U19	1	(0)
2019	Norway U21	2	(1)
- * Club domestic league appearances and goals as of 15:04, 27 February 2023 (UTC)

Hasan Hüseyin Duman (born 12 April 1999) is a Norwegian professional footballer who plays as a midfielder for Åskollen in the Norwegian Third Division.

== Early and personal life ==
He hails from the Drammen neighborhood of Fjell. He is of Turkish descent.

== Club career ==
As a child he played for local club Marienlyst before joining Strømsgodset's youth section in 2012.

Duman made his senior debut for Strømsgodset in June 2018 against Ranheim. After two more league games, in 2019 he only featured in one cup game. He trialled with Antalyaspor in the winter of 2019.

Being released by Strømsgodset after the 2019 season, he signed for Åssiden IF in the 2019–20 winter transfer window. He did not play any matches for Åssiden as the 2020 3. divisjon was suspended because of COVID-19, before signing for Fredrikstad in June 2020. After struggling with many injuries throughout his career, Duman was injured again shortly after he moved to Fredrikstad. For that reason, he asked to have his contract terminated, which the club complied with on 9 October 2020, just three months after his arrival.

In July 2021, Duman returned to this former club Åssiden IF. Ahead of the 2022 season, Duman signed with Åskollen FK.

== International career ==
He made his debut for Norway in November 2014, for Norway U15. He played at every youth level up to and including under-21.
