= Borger Thomas =

Norwegian footballer (born 1995)

Personal information
- Full name: Borger Bergmann Thomas
- Date of birth: 15 February 1995 (age 31)
- Place of birth: Arendal, Norway
- Height: 1.88 m (6 ft 2 in)
- Position: Goalkeeper

Team information
- Current team: Øygarden
- Number: 1

Youth career
- 2000–2011: Bærum

Senior career*
Years	Team	Apps	(Gls)
–2011	Bærum		
2012–2017	Strømsgodset	0	(0)
2013	→ Drammen (loan)	11	(0)
2014	→ Stabæk (loan)	2	(0)
2015	→ Ham-Kam (loan)	11	(0)
2016	→ Nybergsund (loan)	24	(0)
2017–2018	Åsane	37	(0)
2019	Sotra	25	(0)
2020–	Øygarden	13	(0)
- * Club domestic league appearances and goals as of 7 November 2020

Borger Thomas (born 15 February 1995) is a Norwegian professional footballer who plays as a goalkeeper for Øygarden.

== Playing career ==
=== Youth years ===
Thomas has Norwegian and British nationality. He spent his youth years in Bærum, joining the club at the age of 5. He was an outfield player until the age of 12, and played as a goalkeeper for Bærum's reserve team in the Norwegian Third Division at the age of 15.

=== Club ===
On 14 December 2011, he signed a three-year contract with Strømsgodset, after training with the club since August the same year. He featured in the match squad twice in both the 2012 and 2013 season, but did not play.

On 12 August 2013, he signed a loan deal with Drammen FK, in the Norwegian Third Division, for the remainder of the season.

He spent the 2014 season on loan to Stabæk in Tippeligaen He got his debut for Stabæk on 25 May in the 11th round match against Lillestrøm, since first choice Sayouba Mandé had left for the 2014 FIFA World Cup. Unfortunately, he was sent off in the 4th minute, and his team proceeded to lose the match 1-5. After being suspended for the red card, he played the full match in the 13th round against Viking, when his team lost 1-4.

On 7 August 2015, he went on loan to HamKam in the Norwegian Second Division.

On 11 January 2016, he signed a half-season loan deal with Nybergsund. He went back on 31 December 2016.

== Career statistics ==
As of 18 August 2018

Club	Season	League			Cup		Total	
Club	Season	Division	Apps	Goals	Apps	Goals	Apps	Goals
Strømsgodset	2012	Tippeligaen	0	0	0	0	0	0
Strømsgodset	2013	Tippeligaen	0	0	0	0	0	0
Drammen FK	2013	3rd Division	11	0	0	0	11	0
Stabæk	2014	Tippeligaen	2	0	1	0	3	0
Strømsgodset	2015	Tippeligaen	0	0	0	0	0	0
HamKam	2015	2. divisjon	11	0	0	0	11	0
Nybergsund	2016	2. divisjon	24	0	0	0	24	0
Åsane	2017	1. divisjon	7	0	3	0	10	0
Åsane	2018	1. divisjon	19	0	1	0	20	0
Total			74	0	5	0	79	0
