= Christopher Lindquist =

Norwegian footballer (born 1995)

Personal information
- Date of birth: 30 October 1995 (age 31)
- Height: 1.81 m (5 ft 11 in)
- Position: Full-back

Team information
- Current team: Lyn
- Number: 17

Youth career
- Strømsgodset

Senior career*
Years	Team	Apps	(Gls)
2014–2019	Strømsgodset	7	(0)
2015–2016	→ Hønefoss (loan)	10	(0)
2017	→ Florø (loan)	29	(1)
2019	→ Kristiansund (loan)	0	(0)
2020–2021	KFUM Oslo	48	(1)
2022–	Lyn	28	(0)
- * Club domestic league appearances and goals as of 7 December 2023

Christopher Lindquist (born 30 October 1995) is a Norwegian professional footballer who plays for Lyn, as a full-back.

He was released from Strømsgodset after the 2019 season.
