= Sebastian Pedersen =

Norwegian footballer (born 1999)

Personal information
- Date of birth: 8 June 1999 (age 27)
- Place of birth: Elverum, Norway
- Height: 1.77 m (5 ft 9 1/2 in)
- Position: Striker

Team information
- Current team: Orlando Pirates

Youth career
- –2015: HamKam
- 2015–2016: Stabæk

Senior career*
Years	Team	Apps	(Gls)
2016–2017	Stabæk	7	(1)
2018–2020	Strømsgodset	5	(0)
2018	→ Strømmen (loan)	6	(0)
2019	→ Florø (loan)	8	(2)
2020	→ Notodden (loan)	7	(0)
2020	HamKam	5	(0)
2021–2024	Moss	66	(27)
2025–2026	Sogndal	42	(20)
2026–	Orlando Pirates	1	(0)

International career
2014	Norway U15	3	(0)
2016	Norway U17	7	(3)
2017	Norway U18	9	(3)
2018	Norway U19	1	(0)
2019	Norway U21	2	(0)
- * Club domestic league appearances and goals as of 26 July 2026

Sebastian Pedersen (born 8 June 1999) is a Norwegian professional footballer who currently plays for South African Premier Division side Orlando Pirates.

Pedersen, who is a younger brother of Marcus Pedersen, started his career in HamKam. At the age of 16, he went from their junior team to that of Stabæk, and also started attending the Norwegian College of Elite Sport. He made his first-team debut one year later, as a late-match substitute in August 2016 against Haugesund. He scored his first goal in his third match as a substitute, against Lillestrøm.

He signed for Strømsgodset in January 2018.

== Orlando Pirates ==
In July 2026, he signed with South African Premier Division Champions Orlando Pirates on a two-year deal.

He made his debut for the club on 22 August 2026, coming on as a substitute during a 1–0 away victory over Sekhukhune United F.C. in the first leg of the MTN 8 semi-final at the Old Peter Mokaba Stadium.

== Career statistics ==
As of 3 August 2019

Season	Club	Division	League		Cup		Total	
Season	Club	Division	Apps	Goals	Apps	Goals	Apps	Goals
2016	Stabæk	Eliteserien	5	1	0	0	5	1
2017	Stabæk	Eliteserien	2	0	1	0	3	0
2018	Strømmen	1. divisjon	6	0	2	1	8	1
2018	Strømsgodset	Eliteserien	0	0	1	0	1	0
2019	Strømsgodset	Eliteserien	5	0	3	2	8	2
Career Total			18	1	7	3	25	4
