= Lars Sætra =

Norwegian footballer (born 1991)

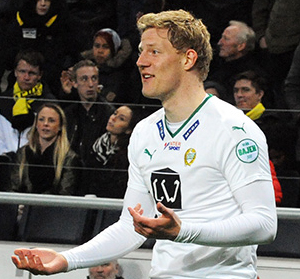

Personal information
- Date of birth: 24 July 1991 (age 35)
- Place of birth: Drammen, Norway
- Height: 1.95 m (6 ft 5 in)
- Position: Centre-back

Team information
- Current team: Kalmar
- Number: 39

Senior career*
| Years | Team | Apps | (Gls) |
| 2009–2014 | Strømsgodset | 55 | (4) |
| 2011 | → Sandefjord Fotball (loan) | 5 | (1) |
| 2014–2016 | Hammarby IF | 62 | (3) |
| 2017 | Baoding Rongda | 14 | (1) |
| 2018–2019 | Strømsgodset | 36 | (3) |
| 2020–2021 | Tromsø | 27 | (2) |
| 2021– | Kalmar | 151 | (15) |

International career
| 2010 | Norway U19 | 4 | (0) |
- * Club domestic league appearances and goals as of 23 May 2026

Lars Sætra (born 24 July 1991) is a Norwegian footballer who plays as a defender for Kalmar FF in Superettan.

== Career ==
=== Strømsgodset ===
He started out playing football for Strømsgodset at a very young age. In 2007, he needed surgery for a knee-injury, but was back in 2008 with his debut on the reserves team. 2009 was the breakout year for Sætra, he played well during the annual youth cup (JET-cupen) and made his first team debut against Fredrikstad on 20 September 2009. In 2010, he has been a starting regular in Tippeligaen, in the absence of teammate Alexander Aas. In the 2010 season he has scored 2 goals, both with his head. On 31 August 2011, Sætra moved to Sandefjord Fotball on a loan for the rest of the season.

=== Hammarby ===
In the summer of 2014 Sætra chose to move to Swedish club Hammarby IF after his contract with Strømsgodset had expired. He played 14 games and scored one goal after moving to Hammarby to help the team achieve promotion to Allsvenskan.

In 2015, he established himself as a key player in manager Nanne Bergstrand's squad, playing 29 league games and scoring once. After the season, in November 2015, he renewed his link to the club by signing a new contract running until the end of 2018.

During the 2016 season Sætra made 19 league appearances for the club.

=== Baoding Rongda ===
In the off season, on 9 January 2017, he signed for the Chinese second tier outfit Baoding Rongda. In December 2017, he was released from Baoding following the relegation of the club.

=== Return to Strømsgodset ===
On 22 February 2018, Sætra re-joined Strømsgodset Toppfotball on a two-year contract. He was released from Strømsgodset after the 2019 season.

=== Tromsø ===
In early 2020, Sætra signed with newly relegated OBOS-ligaen side Tromsø on a two-year contract.

=== Kalmar ===
After only one season at Tromsø, Sætra went back to Swedish football, and signed with Allsvenskan side Kalmar.

== International career ==
Sætra played one match in the 2010 UEFA European Under-19 Football Championship qualification, and is selected for the starting line-up during the elite qualification.

== Career statistics ==
As of match played 23 May 2026

Appearances and goals by club, season and competition
| Club | Season | Division | League | | National Cup (Note: Including Norwegian Cup, Svenska Cupen) | | Europe | | Total | |
| Club | Season | Division | Apps | Goals | Apps | Goals | Apps | Goals | Apps | Goals |
|---|---|---|---|---|---|---|---|---|---|---|
| Strømsgodset | 2009 | Tippeligaen | 2 | 0 | 0 | 0 | — | | 2 | 0 |
| Strømsgodset | 2010 | Tippeligaen | 18 | 3 | 4 | 0 | — | | 22 | 3 |
| Strømsgodset | 2011 | Tippeligaen | 8 | 0 | 2 | 0 | — | | 10 | 0 |
| Strømsgodset | 2012 | Tippeligaen | 13 | 0 | 3 | 1 | — | | 16 | 1 |
| Strømsgodset | 2013 | Tippeligaen | 5 | 0 | 0 | 0 | — | | 5 | 0 |
| Strømsgodset | 2014 | Tippeligaen | 9 | 1 | 2 | 0 | — | | 11 | 1 |
| Strømsgodset | Total | | 55 | 4 | 11 | 1 | — | | 66 | 4 |
| Sandefjord (loan) | 2011 | Adeccoligaen | 5 | 1 | 0 | 0 | — | | 5 | 1 |
| Hammarby | 2014 | Superettan | 14 | 1 | 0 | 0 | — | | 14 | 1 |
| Hammarby | 2015 | Allsvenskan | 29 | 1 | 5 | 1 | — | | 34 | 2 |
| Hammarby | 2016 | Allsvenskan | 19 | 1 | 6 | 0 | — | | 25 | 1 |
| Hammarby | Total | | 62 | 3 | 11 | 1 | — | | 73 | 4 |
| Baoding Rongda | 2017 | China League One | 14 | 1 | 0 | 0 | — | | 14 | 1 |
| Strømsgodset | 2018 | Eliteserien | 18 | 1 | 5 | 0 | — | | 23 | 1 |
| Strømsgodset | 2019 | Eliteserien | 18 | 2 | 3 | 0 | — | | 21 | 2 |
| Strømsgodset | Total | | 36 | 3 | 8 | 0 | — | | 44 | 3 |
| Tromsø | 2020 | OBOS-ligaen | 27 | 2 | — | | — | | 27 | 2 |
| Kalmar | 2021 | Allsvenskan | 28 | 0 | 2 | 0 | — | | 30 | 0 |
| Kalmar | 2022 | Allsvenskan | 30 | 3 | 5 | 0 | — | | 35 | 3 |
| Kalmar | 2023 | Allsvenskan | 29 | 3 | 1 | 0 | 2 (Note: Appearances in the UEFA Europa Conference League) | 0 | 32 | 3 |
| Kalmar | 2024 | Allsvenskan | 28 | 3 | 3 | 0 | — | | 31 | 3 |
| Kalmar | 2025 | Superettan | 28 | 6 | 3 | 0 | — | | 31 | 6 |
| Kalmar | 2026 | Allsvenskan | 8 | 0 | 0 | 0 | — | | 8 | 0 |
| Kalmar | Total | | 151 | 15 | 14 | 0 | 2 | 0 | 167 | 15 |
| Career Total | | | 350 | 29 | 44 | 2 | 2 | 0 | 396 | 31 |

== Honours ==
Strømsgodset

- Tippeligaen: 2013
- Norwegian Cup: 2010, runner-up: 2018

Hammarby

- Superettan: 2014

Tromsø

- OBOS-ligaen: 2020
