= Morten Sætra =

Norwegian footballer (born 1997)

Personal information
- Date of birth: 18 June 1997 (age 29)
- Place of birth: Drammen, Norway
- Height: 1.98 m (6 ft 6 in)
- Position: Goalkeeper

Team information
- Current team: Oddevold
- Number: 12

Youth career
- –2015: Strømsgodset

Senior career*
Years	Team	Apps	(Gls)
2016–2023	Strømsgodset	12	(0)
2017	→ Nybergsund (loan)	23	(0)
2018	→ Elverum (loan)	14	(0)
2019	→ Strømmen (loan)	10	(0)
2024	Levanger	30	(0)
2025–	Oddevold	58	(0)
- * Club domestic league appearances and goals as of 12 November 2026

Morten Sætra (born 18 June 1997) is a Norwegian footballer who plays as a goalkeeper for IK Oddevold.

He is a younger brother of fellow Strømsgodset player Lars Sætra.

== Career ==
Sætra played youth football as a defender until the spring of 2013, and was selected as a Norway youth international as a goalkeeper in 2014. Ahead of the 2016 season he was promoted into Strømsgodset's senior squad.
