= Drammen FK =

Norwegian football club

- Full name: Drammen Fotballklubb
- Founded: 23 August 2008 (Åskollen FK was founded 1992)
- Dissolved: 2016
- Ground: Marienlyst stadion
- Capacity: 8,935
- 2016: 3. divisjon/ 4, 14th of 14
Home colours	Away colours

Drammen Fotballklubb was a Norwegian association football club from Drammen Municipality, founded in 2008. It last played in the 2016 3. divisjon. The club dissolved after the 2016 season.

== History ==
Logo of Åskollen FK.

The club was established on 23 August 2008 as a merger between Åskollen FK, founded 1992, and Drammen FK, founded 2005. Åskollen had experienced a series of promotions from the Seventh to the Third Division, and was the better team, with Drammen FK playing in the Sixth Division. However, as the club was aiming to become the second best team in the city of Drammen behind Strømsgodset IF, the name Drammen FK was chosen. As its home field, Drammen FK chose Strømsgodset's stadium Marienlyst stadion. Team colors were changed from yellow and black to blue.

Several other clubs based in Drammen were asked to take part in the merger: Åssiden IF, Konnerud IL, SBK Skiold, Drammens BK, SK Drafn and Glassverket IF. Of these, Åssiden and Konnerud were decent Third Division clubs, while the rest played at lower levels. It soon became clear that these two clubs declined to merge, citing ambitions to succeed and win promotion on their own. The next month, Drafn and Drammens BK declined as well. Both clubs wished to downplay the elite aspect of their own clubs. However, Skiold and Glassverket decided to join, but unlike Åskollen they continued to exist as independent entities, their tie to Drammen FK taking the character of a feeder club.

In its last month as an independent club, Åskollen won its Third Division group, and was pitted against Førde IL in a qualifying playoff for the Norwegian Second Division. A two-leg playoff, the first match was played in Førde, where Førde IL won 2–0. However, Førde's aspirations were crushed in the second leg, where Åskollen won 8–1, thus securing promotion to the Second Division.

Ahead of the 2009 season Drammen FK recruited a new head coach, Håkon Grøttland from Manglerud Star. Their squad was strengthened mainly with youth players from Strømsgodset and Stabæk. Grøttland is the only full-time employee involved with the men's team. Coincidentally, the season opener of 2009—and the first game of Drammen FK as a club—was against the reserve team of Strømsgodset. It ended with a 2–5 loss, with Drammen playing the last fifteen minutes with a striker as goalkeeper. In its first match in the 2009 Norwegian Football Cup, it beat Fram Larvik 2–1 after extra time. In the second round Drammen was defeated by Mjøndalen IF with 1–5. In the summer of 2009 the team signed Erik Mykland. Nothing helped, and the team ended in last place and was relegated. Håkon Grøttland left the club to become player developer in Buskerud District.

The club finished 14th and last in the 2016 3. divisjon. The club dissolved after the 2016 season.
