= List of Norwegian football transfers summer 2026 =

This is a list of Norwegian football transfers in the 2026 summer transfer window by club. Only clubs of the 2026 Eliteserien and 2026 Norwegian First Division are included.

== Eliteserien ==
=== Aalesund ===
In: Note: Flags indicate national team as defined under FIFA eligibility rules; some limited exceptions apply. Players may hold more than one non-FIFA nationality.

| No. | Pos. | Nation | Player |
|---|---|---|---|
| 1 | GK | GER | Luca Podlech (on loan from (Germany) Schalke 04) |
| 8 | MF | NOR | Isak Skotheim (from Hødd) |
| 19 | MF | NOR | Sander Kartum (from (Scotland) Hearts) |
| 23 | FW | SWE | Stefano Vecchia (from (Sweden) Malmö FF) |
| 28 | DF | SEN | Cheikh Mbacke Diop (on loan from Brann) |
| 30 | FW | NOR | Storm Karlsson Knutsen (promoted from junior squad) |
| 38 | MF | NOR | Tobias Leikanger (promoted from junior squad) |

Out: Note: Flags indicate national team as defined under FIFA eligibility rules; some limited exceptions apply. Players may hold more than one non-FIFA nationality.

| No. | Pos. | Nation | Player |
|---|---|---|---|
| 1 | GK | NOR | Kristoffer Klaesson (retired) |
| 8 | MF | NOR | Henrik Melland (to Lillestrøm) |
| 11 | MF | ISL | Davíð Jóhannsson (on loan to Bryne) |
| 28 | MF | NOR | Eivind Kolve (on loan to Jerv, previously on loan at Brattvåg, then made permanent) |
| 39 | FW | NOR | Kristian Lonebu (to Molde) |

=== Bodø/Glimt ===
In: Note: Flags indicate national team as defined under FIFA eligibility rules; some limited exceptions apply. Players may hold more than one non-FIFA nationality.

| No. | Pos. | Nation | Player |
|---|---|---|---|
| 16 | MF | NOR | Joshua Kitolano (from (Netherlands) Sparta Rotterdam) |
| 22 | FW | NOR | Joel Mvuka (from (France) Lorient) |
| 28 | MF | GAM | Assan Sanyang (from (The Gambia) Tijan Jaiteh FC) |

Out: Note: Flags indicate national team as defined under FIFA eligibility rules; some limited exceptions apply. Players may hold more than one non-FIFA nationality.

| No. | Pos. | Nation | Player |
|---|---|---|---|
| 9 | FW | DEN | Kasper Høgh (to (Scotland) Celtic) |
| 22 | MF | DEN | Anders Klynge (to (Poland) Jagiellonia Białystok) |
| 24 | MF | NOR | Daniel Bassi (to Lillestrøm) |
| 77 | FW | DEN | Mikkel Bro Hansen (to (Netherlands) PSV) |

=== Brann ===
In: Note: Flags indicate national team as defined under FIFA eligibility rules; some limited exceptions apply. Players may hold more than one non-FIFA nationality.

| No. | Pos. | Nation | Player |
|---|---|---|---|
| 2 | DF | NOR | Leo Cornic (from Tromsø) |
| 7 | MF | ISL | Kjartan Már Kjartansson (from (Scotland) Aberdeen) |
| 8 | MF | NOR | Sondre Tronstad (from (England) Blackburn Rovers) |
| 21 | DF | NED | Neraysho Kasanwirjo (from (Netherlands) Feyenoord) |
| 30 | FW | NGR | Chinedu Cyprain Ononogbo (promoted from B team) |
| 36 | GK | NOR | Håkon Hellesøy (promoted from junior squad) |
| 39 | FW | NOR | Julian Lægreid (loan return from Moss) |
| 41 | MF | NOR | Lars Remmem (loan return from Haugesund) |
| — | GK | NED | Tom Bramel (loan return from (Netherlands) RKC Waalwijk) |

Out: Note: Flags indicate national team as defined under FIFA eligibility rules; some limited exceptions apply. Players may hold more than one non-FIFA nationality.

| No. | Pos. | Nation | Player |
|---|---|---|---|
| 2 | DF | NOR | Martin Hellan (on loan to Sandefjord) |
| 6 | DF | SEN | Cheikh Mbacke Diop (on loan to Aalesund) |
| 7 | FW | ISL | Jon Dagur Thorsteinsson (loan return to (Germany) Hertha BSC) |
| 8 | MF | NOR | Felix Horn Myhre (to (England) West Bromwich Albion) |
| 21 | DF | BEL | Denzel De Roeve (to (Belgium) Union SG) |
| 24 | GK | NOR | Mathias Klausen (on loan to Åsane, previously on loan at Sandviken) |
| 26 | FW | WAL | Rabbi Matondo (released) |
| 32 | FW | NOR | Markus Haaland (on loan to (Sweden) Häcken) |
| 41 | MF | NOR | Lars Remmem (on loan to Haugesund (second time)) |
| 43 | DF | NOR | Rasmus Holten (to Sandefjord) |

=== Fredrikstad ===
In: Note: Flags indicate national team as defined under FIFA eligibility rules; some limited exceptions apply. Players may hold more than one non-FIFA nationality.

| No. | Pos. | Nation | Player |
|---|---|---|---|
| 11 | FW | NOR | Liam West (from (Denmark) FC København) |
| 18 | FW | NOR | Bryan Fiabema (from (Poland) Lech Poznan) |
| 21 | MF | POL | Jakub Jezierski (on loan from (Czech Republic) Sigma Olomouc) |
| 29 | MF | USA | Gabriel Wesseh (from (United States) Atlanta United 2) |
| 30 | GK | NOR | Jasper Silva Torkildsen (from Start) |
| 38 | DF | NOR | Isak Helstad Amundsen (from Molde) |

Out: Note: Flags indicate national team as defined under FIFA eligibility rules; some limited exceptions apply. Players may hold more than one non-FIFA nationality.

| No. | Pos. | Nation | Player |
|---|---|---|---|
| 3 | DF | NOR | Aleksander Andresen (to Hamkam) |
| 15 | MF | NOR | Eirik Granaas (to (Portugal) Porto) |
| 18 | DF | NOR | Jonathan Vonheim Norbye (loan return to (Germany) RB Leipzig U20) |
| 19 | MF | EST | Rocco Shein (to (England) Portsmouth) |
| 20 | MF | DEN | Oskar Øhlenschlæger (to (Turkey) Samsunspor) |
| 24 | MF | NOR | Torjus Engebakken (to Bryne, previously on loan at Raufoss) |

=== HamKam ===
In: Note: Flags indicate national team as defined under FIFA eligibility rules; some limited exceptions apply. Players may hold more than one non-FIFA nationality.

| No. | Pos. | Nation | Player |
|---|---|---|---|
| 5 | DF | NOR | Aleksander Andresen (from Fredrikstad) |
| 11 | FW | NOR | Mohamed Ofkir (from Vålerenga) |
| 18 | FW | POR | Duarte Moreira (from Bryne) |
| 24 | FW | IRQ | Danilo Al-Saed (on loan from (Sweden) Häcken) |
| 25 | DF | VEN | David de Ornelas (loan return from Raufoss) |
| 27 | DF | POR | João Barros (loan return from Raufoss) |
| 29 | FW | SEN | Mame Alassane Niang (from Lyn, previously on loan) |
| 29 | MF | KOS | Blerton Isufi (on loan from Molde) |
| — | MF | NOR | Olav Mengshoel (loan return from Eidsvold Turn) |
| — | FW | SEN | Mamadou Diop (on loan from (Senegal) Diambars) |

Out: Note: Flags indicate national team as defined under FIFA eligibility rules; some limited exceptions apply. Players may hold more than one non-FIFA nationality.

| No. | Pos. | Nation | Player |
|---|---|---|---|
| 5 | DF | SWE | Anton Ekeroth (to (Czech Republic) Sigma Olomouc) |
| 11 | FW | NOR | Eron Gojani (on loan to (Sweden) GIF Sundsvall) |
| 15 | DF | NOR | Ilir Kukleci (to (Albania) Teuta) |
| 18 | MF | NOR | Gard Simenstad (to Odd) |
| 20 | FW | NOR | Julian Gonstad (to KFUM) |
| 21 | MF | SWE | Noah Alexandersson (on loan to Moss) |
| 24 | DF | USA | Ian Hoffmann (loan return to (Poland) Lech Poznan) |
| 27 | DF | POR | João Barros (on loan to Raufoss) |
| 29 | FW | SEN | Mame Alassane Niang (to (Portugal) Porto) |
| — | DF | NOR | Ola Nikolai Rye (on loan to Ullern) |

=== KFUM ===
In: Note: Flags indicate national team as defined under FIFA eligibility rules; some limited exceptions apply. Players may hold more than one non-FIFA nationality.

| No. | Pos. | Nation | Player |
|---|---|---|---|
| 6 | MF | NOR | Jacob Blixt Flaten (from Sogndal) |
| 8 | MF | NOR | Brage Tobiassen (from Stabæk) |
| 11 | MF | NOR | Ola Visted (on loan from Viking) |
| 17 | FW | NOR | Julian Gonstad (from Hamkam) |
| 25 | DF | NOR | Håkon Røsten (from Rosenborg) |
| 29 | MF | NOR | Isaiah Skovsgaard (promoted from junior squad) |
| 32 | MF | NGR | Samuel Tochukwu (from (Nigeria) P Sports Academy) |
| — | FW | NGR | Promise Meliga (from Vålerenga) |

Out: Note: Flags indicate national team as defined under FIFA eligibility rules; some limited exceptions apply. Players may hold more than one non-FIFA nationality.

| No. | Pos. | Nation | Player |
|---|---|---|---|
| 4 | DF | GAM | Momodou Lion Njie (on loan to Moss) |
| 6 | MF | NOR | Mansour Sinyan (on loan to (Faroe Islands) KÍ) |
| 7 | MF | NOR | Simen Hestnes (to (Sweden) Häcken) |
| 11 | FW | NOR | Moussa Njie (on loan to Moss) |
| 12 | GK | POL | Krzysztof Bąkowski (loan return to (Poland) Lech Poznań) |
| 17 | FW | NOR | Teodor Berg Haltvik (to (Denmark) SønderjyskE) |
| 26 | DF | NOR | Joachim Prent-Eckbo (on loan to Arendal, previously on loan at Brattvåg, later on loan to Ull/Kisa) |

=== Kristiansund ===
In: Note: Flags indicate national team as defined under FIFA eligibility rules; some limited exceptions apply. Players may hold more than one non-FIFA nationality.

| No. | Pos. | Nation | Player |
|---|---|---|---|
| 7 | FW | NOR | Sander Svendsen (from (Turkey) Konyaspor) |
| 8 | MF | NOR | Eron Isufi (on loan from Lyn) |
| 11 | FW | NOR | Zymer Bytyqi (from (Bulgaria) CSKA Sofia) |
| 22 | DF | NOR | John Kitolano (from Lillestrøm) |
| 24 | FW | DEN | Gustav Christensen (on loan from (Germany) Hertha BSC) |
| — | DF | DEN | Noah Ibsen (from (Denmark) AB Gladsaxe) |

Out: Note: Flags indicate national team as defined under FIFA eligibility rules; some limited exceptions apply. Players may hold more than one non-FIFA nationality.

| No. | Pos. | Nation | Player |
|---|---|---|---|
| 6 | MF | NOR | Niklas Ødegård (to Molde) |
| 7 | FW | NGR | Mustapha Isah (to (Belgium) RAAL La Louvière) |
| 9 | FW | NOR | Sander Kilen (to Molde) |
| 11 | FW | NOR | Franklin Nyenetue (to (Georgia (country)) Dila Gori, previously on loan at Ranheim) |
| 13 | DF | DEN | Alexander Munksgaard (to (Denmark) SønderjyskE) |
| 15 | DF | NOR | Nikolai Skuseth (loan return to Sarpsborg 08) |
| 18 | FW | NGR | Promise Meliga (loan return to Vålerenga) |
| 21 | DF | SRB | Igor Jeličić (released, previously on loan at (Serbia) Napredak Kruševac) |
| 31 | MF | NOR | Herman Sjåvik Opsahl (on loan to Træff) |
| 40 | GK | NOR | Sander Rød (on loan to Follo) |
| 77 | FW | ISL | Hrannar Snær Magnusson (to (Iceland) Vikingur) |
| — | DF | DEN | Noah Ibsen (on loan to Moss) |

=== Lillestrøm ===
In: Note: Flags indicate national team as defined under FIFA eligibility rules; some limited exceptions apply. Players may hold more than one non-FIFA nationality.

| No. | Pos. | Nation | Player |
|---|---|---|---|
| 8 | FW | NOR | Fredrik Gulbrandsen (from Molde) |
| 15 | FW | SWE | Gustav Nordh (from (Sweden) Brage) |
| 16 | MF | NOR | Henrik Melland (from Aalesund) |
| 21 | MF | SWE | Filip Ottosson (on loan from (Sweden) IFK Göteborg) |
| 22 | MF | NOR | Daniel Bassi (from Bodø/Glimt) |
| 25 | FW | NGR | Seun Akanji (from (Nigeria) Sporting Lagos) |
| 47 | DF | NOR | Stian Kristiansen (from Sandefjord) |

Out: Note: Flags indicate national team as defined under FIFA eligibility rules; some limited exceptions apply. Players may hold more than one non-FIFA nationality.

| No. | Pos. | Nation | Player |
|---|---|---|---|
| 6 | MF | NOR | Harald Woxen (on loan to Sogndal) |
| 8 | MF | NOR | Markus Karlsbakk (to (Turkey) Çorum) |
| 9 | FW | NGR | Kparobo Arierhi (on loan to Sogndal) |
| 15 | FW | GAM | Salieu Drammeh (to (Belgium) Standard Liège) |
| 22 | DF | NOR | John Kitolano (to Kristiansund) |
| 23 | DF | NOR | Ulrik Yttergård Jenssen (loan return to Rosenborg) |
| 27 | FW | NOR | Markus Wæhler (on loan to Strømmen) |
| 30 | DF | NOR | Lucas Svenningsen (on loan to Skeid, previously on loan at Tromsdalen) |
| 31 | FW | GRE | Angelos Chaminta (on loan to Kongsvinger) |
| — | MF | NGR | Efe Lucky (to (Albania) Pogradeci) |

=== Molde ===
In: Note: Flags indicate national team as defined under FIFA eligibility rules; some limited exceptions apply. Players may hold more than one non-FIFA nationality.

| No. | Pos. | Nation | Player |
|---|---|---|---|
| 6 | MF | NOR | Niklas Ødegård (from Kristiansund) |
| 8 | MF | NOR | Mathias Fjørtoft Løvik (from (Turkey) Trabzonspor) |
| 12 | GK | NOR | Peder Hoel Lervik (loan return from Åsane) |
| 16 | FW | NOR | Sander Kilen (from Kristiansund) |
| 20 | FW | NOR | Kristian Lonebu (from Aalesund) |
| 29 | FW | SEN | Seydina Diop (from Ranheim) |
| 43 | MF | NOR | Jonathan Fugelsnes (promoted from junior squad) |
| 44 | FW | NOR | Ivan Gosik (promoted from junior squad, later loan return from Strømsgodset) |

Out: Note: Flags indicate national team as defined under FIFA eligibility rules; some limited exceptions apply. Players may hold more than one non-FIFA nationality.

| No. | Pos. | Nation | Player |
|---|---|---|---|
| 3 | DF | NOR | Casper Øyvann (to Tromsø) |
| 6 | DF | NOR | Isak Helstad Amundsen (to Fredrikstad) |
| 8 | FW | NOR | Fredrik Gulbrandsen (to Lillestrøm) |
| 14 | MF | DEN | Jacob Steen Christensen (on loan to (Denmark) SønderjyskE) |
| 20 | MF | DEN | Mads Enggård (to (Sweden) Mjällby, previously on loan at (Denmark) Vejle) |
| 31 | MF | KOS | Blerton Isufi (on loan to Hamkam) |
| 44 | FW | NOR | Ivan Gosik (on loan to Strømsgodset) |

=== Rosenborg ===
In: Note: Flags indicate national team as defined under FIFA eligibility rules; some limited exceptions apply. Players may hold more than one non-FIFA nationality.

| No. | Pos. | Nation | Player |
|---|---|---|---|
| 6 | MF | NOR | Mathias Kjølø (from (Netherlands) Twente) |
| 18 | FW | ALG | Amin Chiakha (from (Denmark) FC Copenhagen, previously on loan) |
| 23 | DF | UKR | Mark Mampassi (from (Russia) Lokomotiv Moscow) |
| 30 | FW | NOR | Maciej Soboczynski (promoted from junior squad) |

Out: Note: Flags indicate national team as defined under FIFA eligibility rules; some limited exceptions apply. Players may hold more than one non-FIFA nationality.

| No. | Pos. | Nation | Player |
|---|---|---|---|
| 2 | DF | NOR | Håkon Røsten (to KFUM) |
| 6 | MF | FIN | Santeri Väänänen (to (Germany) Karlsruher SC) |
| 23 | DF | NOR | Ulrik Yttergård Jenssen (to (Denmark) OB, previously on loan at Lillestrøm) |
| 30 | FW | NOR | Magnus Holte (on loan to Levanger, previously on loan at (Sweden) Norrby) |

=== Sandefjord ===
In: Note: Flags indicate national team as defined under FIFA eligibility rules; some limited exceptions apply. Players may hold more than one non-FIFA nationality.

| No. | Pos. | Nation | Player |
|---|---|---|---|
| 2 | DF | NOR | Martin Hellan (on loan from Brann) |
| 8 | MF | NOR | Tobias Børkeeiet (from (Austria) Rapid Wien) |
| 9 | FW | NOR | Oscar Kapskarmo (on loan from Egersund) |
| 10 | MF | SWE | Ervin Gigović (from (Sweden) Helsingborg) |
| 13 | DF | NOR | Rasmus Holten (from Brann) |
| 18 | MF | DEN | Mathias Sauer (from (Poland) Górnik Zabrze) |
| 22 | DF | NED | Devon Koswal (from (Netherlands) Telstar) |
| 32 | FW | NOR | Daniel Skaarud (from (Netherlands) Jong Ajax) |
| 38 | DF | GHA | Christopher Abanga (from (Ghana) Africa Vikings) |

Out: Note: Flags indicate national team as defined under FIFA eligibility rules; some limited exceptions apply. Players may hold more than one non-FIFA nationality.

| No. | Pos. | Nation | Player |
|---|---|---|---|
| 2 | DF | SWE | Zinedin Smajlovic (to (Greece) Olympiakos) |
| 8 | MF | SWE | Robin Dzabic (on loan to (Sweden) Degerfors) |
| 10 | MF | NOR | Ruben Alte (loan return to Viking) |
| 47 | DF | NOR | Stian Kristiansen (to Lillestrøm) |

=== Sarpsborg 08 ===
In: Note: Flags indicate national team as defined under FIFA eligibility rules; some limited exceptions apply. Players may hold more than one non-FIFA nationality.

| No. | Pos. | Nation | Player |
|---|---|---|---|
| 1 | GK | DEN | Jacob Pryts (on loan from Start) |
| 2 | DF | NOR | Marius Lode (from (Sweden) Häcken) |
| 5 | DF | NOR | Luca Høyland (from Skeid) |
| 77 | MF | NOR | Olaus Skarsem (from (Bulgaria) CSKA Sofia) |

Out: Note: Flags indicate national team as defined under FIFA eligibility rules; some limited exceptions apply. Players may hold more than one non-FIFA nationality.

| No. | Pos. | Nation | Player |
|---|---|---|---|
| 1 | GK | SEN | Mamour Ndiaye (to (France) Saint-Étienne) |
| 2 | GK | NED | Menno Koch (to (India) Bengaluru) |
| 3 | DF | NOR | Nikolai Skuseth (on loan to (Sweden) Degerfors, previously on loan at Kristiansund) |
| 5 | DF | NOR | Magnar Ødegaard (retired) |
| 13 | GK | FIN | Carljohan Eriksson (to (Denmark) Nordsjælland) |
| 14 | FW | NOR | Jo Inge Berget (released) |
| 26 | MF | CIV | Chris Kouakou (to (Israel) Ironi Tiberias) |
| 29 | FW | NOR | Martin Håheim-Elveseter (on loan to Hødd, previously on loan at Egersund) |
| 80 | MF | NOR | Szymon Roguski (on loan to Kvik Halden, previously on loan at (Italy) Cagliari Primavera) |
| 81 | MF | NOR | Mathias Svenningsen-Grønn (on loan to Strømmen) |
| – | MF | NOR | Harald Nilsen Tangen (on loan to (Denmark) Vendsyssel, previously on loan at (England) Notts County) |

=== Start ===
In: Note: Flags indicate national team as defined under FIFA eligibility rules; some limited exceptions apply. Players may hold more than one non-FIFA nationality.

| No. | Pos. | Nation | Player |
|---|---|---|---|
| 5 | DF | NOR | Sander Aske Granheim (from Sogndal) |
| 8 | FW | SRB | Nikola Jojić (from (England) Stoke City) |
| 9 | FW | CYP | Nikolas Koutsakos (from (Cyprus) APOEL) |
| 12 | DF | NOR | Deni Dashaev (loan return from Strømmen) |
| 15 | FW | NOR | Marius Nordal (loan return from Åsane) |
| 24 | GK | NOR | Storm Strand-Kolbjørnsen (loan return from Åsane) |
| 26 | GK | NOR | Magnus Sjøeng (on loan from Vålerenga) |
| 28 | DF | NOR | Jens Husebø (from Tromsø) |
| 35 | FW | SWE | Santino Samuyiwa (on loan from (Spain) Real Sociedad C) |
| 45 | GK | SRB | Filip Manojlović (on loan from (Sweden) Djurgården) |

Out: Note: Flags indicate national team as defined under FIFA eligibility rules; some limited exceptions apply. Players may hold more than one non-FIFA nationality.

| No. | Pos. | Nation | Player |
|---|---|---|---|
| 1 | GK | DEN | Jacob Pryts (to Sarpsborg 08) |
| 5 | DF | TUN | Omar Jebali (to Moss) |
| 7 | FW | NOR | Alexander Gurendal (on loan to Hønefoss) |
| 9 | FW | NGR | Ahmed Adebayo (to (Finland) KTP, previously on loan at (Malta) Valletta) |
| 14 | MF | EST | Markus Soomets (to (Denmark) Kolding) |
| 16 | FW | SWE | Tom Strannegård (to (Switzerland) Thun) |
| 21 | FW | NOR | Felix Kutsche Eriksen (on loan to Ull/Kisa, previously on loan at Arendal) |
| 22 | FW | GHA | James Ampofo (loan return to Strømsgodset) |
| 24 | GK | NOR | Storm Strand-Kolbjørnsen (on loan to Åsane) |
| 25 | FW | NGR | Terry Benjamin (on loan to Strømmen) |
| 26 | GK | NOR | Jasper Silva Torkildsen (to Fredrikstad) |
| 30 | MF | NOR | Lukas Gausdal (on loan to Sogndal) |

=== Tromsø ===
In: Note: Flags indicate national team as defined under FIFA eligibility rules; some limited exceptions apply. Players may hold more than one non-FIFA nationality.

| No. | Pos. | Nation | Player |
|---|---|---|---|
| 14 | MF | NOR | Sigurd Prestmo (loan return from Moss) |
| 15 | FW | NOR | Vegard Erlien (from (Spain) Real Valladolid) |
| 16 | DF | NOR | Benjamin Myrvold (from Vindbjart) |
| 17 | MF | SWE | Isak Dahlqvist (from (Austria) Blau-Weiß Linz) |
| 18 | FW | NOR | Nikolai Hristov (from Strømmen) |
| 21 | DF | SWE | Leon Hien (on loan from (Sweden) Djurgården) |
| 24 | DF | NGR | Vince Osuji (from (Belgium) Club Brugge) |
| 25 | DF | NOR | Casper Øyvann (from Molde) |
| 32 | GK | NOR | Øystein Norheim (from Finnsnes) |
| 33 | DF | GAM | Musa Jatta (from (Sweden) Öster) |
| 70 | MF | NOR | Morten Bjørlo (from (Turkey) Konyaspor) |

Out: Note: Flags indicate national team as defined under FIFA eligibility rules; some limited exceptions apply. Players may hold more than one non-FIFA nationality.

| No. | Pos. | Nation | Player |
|---|---|---|---|
| 2 | DF | NOR | Leo Cornic (to Brann) |
| 6 | MF | NOR | Jens Hjertø-Dahl (to (England) Hull City) |
| 15 | FW | SWE | Viktor Ekblom (on loan to (Sweden) Örgryte) |
| 20 | FW | CPV | Ieltsin Camões (on loan to (Poland) Śląsk Wrocław, previously on loan at (Egypt) Al Ahly) |
| 21 | DF | NOR | Tobias Guddal (to (Czech Republic) Sparta Praha) |
| 24 | DF | NOR | Jens Husebø (to Start) |
| 25 | DF | GAM | Abubacarr Sedi Kinteh (to (Saudi Arabia) Al-Ahli) |
| 32 | GK | MTN | Abderrahmane Sarr (on loan to Raufoss) |
| 92 | MF | NOR | Johan Solstad-Nøis (on loan to Lyn) |
| — | FW | NOR | Sean Nilsen-Modebe (on loan to Lørenskog, previously on loan at Hødd) |
| — | FW | DEN | Frederik Christensen (to (Denmark) Hobro, previously on loan at (Germany) FC Ingolstadt) |

=== Viking ===
In: Note: Flags indicate national team as defined under FIFA eligibility rules; some limited exceptions apply. Players may hold more than one non-FIFA nationality.

| No. | Pos. | Nation | Player |
|---|---|---|---|
| — | FW | AUS | Nicholas D'Agostino (loan return from (Australia) Brisbane Roar) |
| 11 | FW | NED | Romano Postema (from (Netherlands) Groningen) |
| 16 | MF | NOR | Henrik Bjørdal (from Vålerengaa) |
| 17 | DF | NED | Essiën Bassey (from (Netherlands) PSV) |
| 19 | FW | ISL | Amin Cosic (from (Iceland) KR) |
| 22 | FW | NOR | Erik Botheim (from (Sweden) Malmö FF) |
| 27 | DF | NOR | Jesper Daland (on loan from (Wales) Cardiff) |
| — | GK | NOR | Erlend Jacobsen (from Brodd) |

Out: Note: Flags indicate national team as defined under FIFA eligibility rules; some limited exceptions apply. Players may hold more than one non-FIFA nationality.

| No. | Pos. | Nation | Player |
|---|---|---|---|
| 15 | MF | NOR | Ola Visted (on loan to KFUM) |
| 16 | MF | NOR | Ruben Alte (on loan to (Denmark) Viborg, previously on loan at Sandefjord) |
| 17 | FW | NOR | Edvin Austbø (to (England) West Ham United) |
| 28 | FW | ISL | Hilmir Mikaelsson (to (Czech Republic) Sigma Olomouc) |

=== Vålerenga ===
In: Note: Flags indicate national team as defined under FIFA eligibility rules; some limited exceptions apply. Players may hold more than one non-FIFA nationality.

| No. | Pos. | Nation | Player |
|---|---|---|---|
| 7 | FW | NOR | Håvard Nielsen (from (Germany) Hannover 96) |
| 11 | FW | KOS | Elbasan Rashani (from (Australia) Melbourne City) |
| 13 | GK | NOR | Sander Lønning (from Egersund) |
| 11 | MF | NOR | Ghayas Zahid (from (Serbia) Partizan) |
| 26 | MF | NOR | Dennis Gjengaar (from (United States) New York Red Bulls) |
| 49 | FW | NOR | Abdoulie Jatta (promoted from junior squad) |
| – | DF | NOR | William Silfver-Ramage (from Grorud) |

Out: Note: Flags indicate national team as defined under FIFA eligibility rules; some limited exceptions apply. Players may hold more than one non-FIFA nationality.

| No. | Pos. | Nation | Player |
|---|---|---|---|
| 7 | FW | NOR | Mohamed Ofkir (to Hamkam) |
| 8 | MF | NOR | Henrik Bjørdal (to Viking) |
| 11 | FW | DEN | Elias Sørensen (to (Netherlands) Zwolle) |
| 14 | FW | NGR | Onyebuchi Obasi (to (Denmark) Hobro, previously on loan at (Sweden) Stockholm) |
| 19 | FW | NGR | Promise Meliga (to KFUM, previously on loan at Kristiansund) |
| 21 | GK | NOR | Magnus Sjøeng (on loan to Start) |
| 26 | FW | NOR | Filip Thorvaldsen (to (Netherlands) Twente) |
| – | DF | NOR | William Silfver-Ramage (on loan to Grorud) |

== 1. divisjon ==
=== Bryne ===
In: Note: Flags indicate national team as defined under FIFA eligibility rules; some limited exceptions apply. Players may hold more than one non-FIFA nationality.

| No. | Pos. | Nation | Player |
|---|---|---|---|
| 2 | DF | NOR | Sander Fjelldalselv (from Rana) |
| 18 | FW | NOR | Luka Fajfric (from Strømmen) |
| 19 | MF | NOR | Torjus Engebakken (from Fredrikstad) |
| 20 | MF | ISL | Davíð Jóhannsson (on loan from Aalesund) |
| 23 | FW | NOR | David Motland (promoted from junior squad) |
| 42 | MF | NOR | Håkon Tveit (promoted from junior squad) |

Out: Note: Flags indicate national team as defined under FIFA eligibility rules; some limited exceptions apply. Players may hold more than one non-FIFA nationality.

| No. | Pos. | Nation | Player |
|---|---|---|---|
| 4 | DF | NOR | Fabian Engedal (on loan to Rana) |
| 18 | FW | POR | Duarte Moreira (to Hamkam) |
| 19 | DF | DEN | Nicklas Strunck (to (Denmark) Esbjerg) |
| 21 | MF | NOR | David Aksnes (to Varhaug) |

=== Egersund ===
In: Note: Flags indicate national team as defined under FIFA eligibility rules; some limited exceptions apply. Players may hold more than one non-FIFA nationality.

| No. | Pos. | Nation | Player |
|---|---|---|---|
| 1 | GK | POL | Marcel Zapytowski (from (Iceland) IBV) |
| 4 | DF | SWE | Ali Suljić (from (Sweden) Östersund) |
| 12 | GK | DEN | Mads Eriksen (from (Denmark) Fredericia) |
| 16 | MF | ISL | Breki Baxter (from (Iceland) Keflavík) |
| 19 | FW | GHA | Richmond Gyamfi (on loan from (Denmark) AGF) |
| 20 | DF | NOR | Jonas Jørgensen (from Hinna) |
| 28 | FW | ISL | Hinrik Hardarson (from Odd) |
| 29 | MF | NOR | Arne Bjørnemo Hetland (promoted from junior squad) |

Out: Note: Flags indicate national team as defined under FIFA eligibility rules; some limited exceptions apply. Players may hold more than one non-FIFA nationality.

| No. | Pos. | Nation | Player |
|---|---|---|---|
| 1 | GK | NOR | Sander Lønning (to Vålerenga) |
| 9 | FW | NOR | Oscar Kapskarmo (on loan to Sandefjord) |
| 11 | FW | SWE | August Ljungberg (loan return to (Sweden) Sirius) |
| 12 | GK | NOR | Sem Bergene (released) |
| 20 | MF | NOR | Petter Hokstad (on loan to Eidsvold Turn, then released to Hønefoss) |
| 28 | FW | NOR | Paweł Chrupałła (to (Sweden) Kristianstad) |
| 29 | FW | NOR | Martin Håheim-Elveseter (loan return to Sarpsborg 08) |
| 37 | FW | GHA | Mustapha Abu (to (Ghana) ProEdge) |
| 91 | DF | SWE | Sammi Davis (to (Sweden) Nordic United) |

=== Haugesund ===
In: Note: Flags indicate national team as defined under FIFA eligibility rules; some limited exceptions apply. Players may hold more than one non-FIFA nationality.

| No. | Pos. | Nation | Player |
|---|---|---|---|
| 1 | GK | NOR | Per Kristian Bråtveit (from (Scotland) Aberdeen) |
| 13 | DF | NZL | Kees Sims (on loan from (Sweden) GAIS) |
| 23 | DF | NOR | Jonathan Vonheim Norbye (from (Germany) RB Leipzig U20) |
| 37 | DF | AUT | Raphael Schifferl (from (Germany) 1860 München) |
| 41 | MF | NOR | Lars Remmem (on loan from Brann (second time)) |

Out: Note: Flags indicate national team as defined under FIFA eligibility rules; some limited exceptions apply. Players may hold more than one non-FIFA nationality.

| No. | Pos. | Nation | Player |
|---|---|---|---|
| 1 | GK | NOR | Amund Wichne (to Mandalskameratene) |
| 6 | MF | BDI | Parfait Bizoza (to (Lithuania) Panevėžys) |
| 17 | FW | NOR | Håvard Vatland Karlsen (on loan to Raufoss) |
| 41 | MF | NOR | Lars Remmem (loan return to Brann) |
| 43 | MF | NOR | Lars Tanggaard Eide (to Vard) |

=== Hødd ===
In: Note: Flags indicate national team as defined under FIFA eligibility rules; some limited exceptions apply. Players may hold more than one non-FIFA nationality.

| No. | Pos. | Nation | Player |
|---|---|---|---|
| 2 | DF | GEQ | Charles Ondo (from (United States) Portland Timbers) |
| 16 | MF | DEN | Mathias Kaarsbo (on loan from (Denmark) Lyngby) |
| 20 | FW | NOR | Jon Berisha (on loan from Ranheim) |
| 22 | FW | NOR | Kasper Reme Abrahamsen (from Lørenskog) |
| 25 | GK | DEN | Oscar Buur (on loan from (Denmark) FC København) |
| 29 | FW | NOR | Martin Håheim-Elveseter (on loan from Sarpsborg 08) |

Out: Note: Flags indicate national team as defined under FIFA eligibility rules; some limited exceptions apply. Players may hold more than one non-FIFA nationality.

| No. | Pos. | Nation | Player |
|---|---|---|---|
| 2 | DF | NOR | Noah Riise (on loan to Pors) |
| — | MF | NOR | Isak Skotheim (to Aalesund) |
| 16 | FW | DEN | Villum Dalsgaard (loan return to (Denmark) Nordsjælland U20) |
| 18 | MF | NOR | Ola Lerheim Olsen (on loan to Lysekloster) |
| 20 | FW | NOR | Sean Nilsen-Modebe (loan return to Tromsø) |
| 22 | | NOR | Daniel Brandal (on loan to Lørenskog) |
| 25 | GK | NOR | Aksel Bergsvik (on loan to Sandviken) |
| 29 | | NOR | Oliver Eliassen Aske (to Lokomotiv Oslo) |

=== Kongsvinger ===
In: Note: Flags indicate national team as defined under FIFA eligibility rules; some limited exceptions apply. Players may hold more than one non-FIFA nationality.

| No. | Pos. | Nation | Player |
|---|---|---|---|
| 21 | FW | GRE | Angelos Chaminta (on loan from Lillestrøm) |
| 24 | FW | NOR | Armand Øverby (loan return from Eidsvold Turn) |
| 25 | MF | SOM | Saadiq Elmi (from Raufoss) |
| 26 | FW | NGR | Emmanuel Olawore (from (Sweden) Umeå) |

Out: Note: Flags indicate national team as defined under FIFA eligibility rules; some limited exceptions apply. Players may hold more than one non-FIFA nationality.

| No. | Pos. | Nation | Player |
|---|---|---|---|
| 7 | MF | BIH | Emin Pajić (on loan to Mjøndalen) |
| 11 | FW | NGR | Daniel Job (to (United States) FC Dallas) |
| 20 | FW | NOR | Albert Sandstad (on loan to (Sweden) FBK Karlstad) |

=== Lyn ===
In: Note: Flags indicate national team as defined under FIFA eligibility rules; some limited exceptions apply. Players may hold more than one non-FIFA nationality.

| No. | Pos. | Nation | Player |
|---|---|---|---|
| 3 | DF | NOR | Edvard Linnebo Race (from Moss) |
| 17 | MF | NOR | Johan Solstad-Nøis (on loan from Tromsø) |
| 19 | MF | NOR | Ole Kallevåg (from Åsane) |
| 26 | FW | MKD | Artan Memedov (from Moss) |
| 29 | DF | SEN | Ousmane Gueye (from (Senegal) Académie Mawade Wade) |
| 66 | MF | NOR | Mathias Emilsen (from Ranheim) |

Out: Note: Flags indicate national team as defined under FIFA eligibility rules; some limited exceptions apply. Players may hold more than one non-FIFA nationality.

| No. | Pos. | Nation | Player |
|---|---|---|---|
| 5 | DF | NOR | Isak Vik (on loan to Mjøndalen) |
| 14 | MF | NOR | Eron Isufi (on loan to Kristiansund) |
| 26 | FW | NOR | Ebrima Sawaneh (to Hønefoss) |
| 28 | FW | SEN | Mame Alassane Niang (to Hamkam, previously on loan) |

=== Moss ===
In: Note: Flags indicate national team as defined under FIFA eligibility rules; some limited exceptions apply. Players may hold more than one non-FIFA nationality.

| No. | Pos. | Nation | Player |
|---|---|---|---|
| 4 | DF | DEN | Noah Ibsen (on loan from Kristiansund) |
| 5 | DF | TUN | Omar Jebali (from Start) |
| 7 | MF | SWE | Noah Alexandersson (on loan from Hamkam) |
| 10 | FW | NOR | Moussa Njie (on loan from KFUM) |
| 12 | GK | NOR | Mads Nymark Rylandsholm (from Lokomotiv Oslo) |
| 19 | MF | DEN | Lasse Overgaard (from (Denmark) FC Midtjylland U19) |
| 24 | DF | GAM | Momodou Lion Njie (on loan from KFUM) |
| 25 | MF | NOR | Taha Usman (on loan from Vålerenga 2) |
| 27 | MF | NOR | Jonas Selnæs (from Raufoss) |

Out: Note: Flags indicate national team as defined under FIFA eligibility rules; some limited exceptions apply. Players may hold more than one non-FIFA nationality.

| No. | Pos. | Nation | Player |
|---|---|---|---|
| 4 | DF | NOR | Kristoffer Lassen Harrison (on loan to Sogndal) |
| 5 | DF | NOR | Edvard Linnebo Race (to Lyn) |
| 7 | FW | NOR | Julian Lægreid (loan return to Brann) |
| 11 | FW | NOR | Thomas Klemetsen Jakobsen (to (Finland) IFK Mariehamn) |
| 18 | FW | MKD | Artan Memedov (to Lyn) |
| 24 | DF | SWE | Wilmer Olofsson (loan return to (Sweden) AIK) |
| 27 | MF | NOR | Sigurd Prestmo (loan return to Tromsø) |
| 29 | FW | NOR | Michee Mayonga (to (Belgium) Union SG U20, previously on loan at Råde) |

=== Odd ===
In: Note: Flags indicate national team as defined under FIFA eligibility rules; some limited exceptions apply. Players may hold more than one non-FIFA nationality.

| No. | Pos. | Nation | Player |
|---|---|---|---|
| 1 | GK | NOR | Tim Erlandsson (on loan from (Sweden) Elfsborg) |
| 20 | MF | NOR | Gard Simenstad (from Hamkam) |
| 22 | FW | DEN | Kasper N. Andersen (from (Denmark) Aarhus Fremad) |

Out: Note: Flags indicate national team as defined under FIFA eligibility rules; some limited exceptions apply. Players may hold more than one non-FIFA nationality.

| No. | Pos. | Nation | Player |
|---|---|---|---|
| 1 | GK | NOR | Sebastian Hansen (to (Sweden) Mjällby) |
| 14 | MF | NOR | Julian Gunnerød (on loan to Notodden) |
| 20 | FW | ISL | Hinrik Hardarson (to Egersund) |

=== Ranheim ===
In: Note: Flags indicate national team as defined under FIFA eligibility rules; some limited exceptions apply. Players may hold more than one non-FIFA nationality.

| No. | Pos. | Nation | Player |
|---|---|---|---|
| 7 | FW | SWE | Maill Lundgren (on loan from (Republic of Ireland) Shelbourne) |
| 9 | FW | NOR | Sebastian Haugland (from (Iceland) Þór) |
| 15 | DF | NOR | Karl Martin Rolstad (from Stjørdals-Blink) |
| — | DF | SEN | Mamadou Diang (loan return from (Belgium) Union SG U23) |
| 17 | FW | NOR | Franklin Nyenetue (from (Georgia (country)) Dila Gori) |
| 32 | DF | GHA | Sebastian Haugland (from (Switzerland) Basel U21) |

Out: Note: Flags indicate national team as defined under FIFA eligibility rules; some limited exceptions apply. Players may hold more than one non-FIFA nationality.

| No. | Pos. | Nation | Player |
|---|---|---|---|
| 6 | MF | NOR | Lucas Kolstad (to Eidsvold Turn, previously on loan) |
| 7 | MF | NOR | Mathias Emilsen (to Lyn) |
| 9 | FW | NOR | Jon Berisha (on loan to Hødd) |
| 13 | DF | NOR | Marius Valle Fagerhaug (on loan to Stjørdals-Blink) |
| 15 | FW | NOR | Franklin Nyenetue (loan return to Kristiansund) |
| 16 | FW | SEN | Seydina Diop (to Molde) |
| 17 | MF | NOR | Dennis Torp-Helland (on loan to Stjørdals-Blink, previously on loan at Trygg/Lade) |
| 18 | MF | SEN | Famara Camara (to (United States) Nashville) |

=== Raufoss ===
In: Note: Flags indicate national team as defined under FIFA eligibility rules; some limited exceptions apply. Players may hold more than one non-FIFA nationality.

| No. | Pos. | Nation | Player |
|---|---|---|---|
| 8 | MF | NOR | Harald Holter (from (Denmark) Roskilde) |
| 15 | DF | DEN | Elias Gärtig (from (United States) Las Vegas Lights) |
| 17 | MF | NOR | Kristian Lønstad Onsrud (on loan from Stabæk) |
| 19 | FW | NOR | Håvard Vatland Karlsen (on loan from Haugesund) |
| 22 | FW | SEN | Samba Boye Coulibaly (from (Senegal) Académie Mawade Wade) |
| 24 | DF | POR | João Barros (on loan from Hamkam) |
| 28 | DF | NOR | Aleksander van der Spa (on loan from Strømsgodset) |
| 30 | FW | NOR | Jonas Dalen Korsaksel (loan return from Gjøvik-Lyn) |
| 32 | MF | NOR | Emil Lyseng Martinsen (promoted from junior squad) |
| 44 | GK | MTN | Abderrahmane Sarr (on loan from Tromsø) |
| 77 | FW | SEN | Mouhamed Naby Camara (from (Senegal) Académie Mawade Wade) |

Out: Note: Flags indicate national team as defined under FIFA eligibility rules; some limited exceptions apply. Players may hold more than one non-FIFA nationality.

| No. | Pos. | Nation | Player |
|---|---|---|---|
| 8 | MF | NOR | Torje Naustdal (on loan to Hønefoss) |
| 15 | DF | VEN | David de Ornelas (loan return to Hamkam) |
| 17 | MF | NOR | Sander Nordbø (to Jerv, previously on loan) |
| 18 | MF | NOR | Torjus Engebakken (loan return to Fredrikstad) |
| 20 | MF | SOM | Saadiq Elmi (to Kongsvinger) |
| 22 | FW | NOR | Filip Fjeldheim da Silva (to Eidsvold Turn) |
| 23 | MF | NOR | Jonas Selnæs (to Moss) |
| 24 | MF | NOR | Torjus Rønningen (to Nordre Land) |
| 24 | DF | POR | João Barros (loan return to Hamkam) |
| 30 | FW | NOR | Jonas Dalen Korsaksel (on loan to Gjøvik-Lyn) |
| — | MF | NOR | Aleksander Sulland (on loan to Skreia, previously on loan at Gjøvik-Lyn) |

=== Sandnes Ulf ===
In: Note: Flags indicate national team as defined under FIFA eligibility rules; some limited exceptions apply. Players may hold more than one non-FIFA nationality.

| No. | Pos. | Nation | Player |
|---|---|---|---|
| 6 | MF | DEN | Aksel Jørgensen (on loan from (Denmark) Lyngby) |
| 28 | MF | DEN | Malthe Henriksen (on loan from (Denmark) Lyngby) |

Out: Note: Flags indicate national team as defined under FIFA eligibility rules; some limited exceptions apply. Players may hold more than one non-FIFA nationality.

| No. | Pos. | Nation | Player |
|---|---|---|---|
| 26 | DF | GRE | Anestis Tricholidis (to (Denmark) Horsens) |
| 28 | DF | GHA | Jamal Deen Haruna (loan return to Sogndal) |

=== Sogndal ===
In: Note: Flags indicate national team as defined under FIFA eligibility rules; some limited exceptions apply. Players may hold more than one non-FIFA nationality.

| No. | Pos. | Nation | Player |
|---|---|---|---|
| 3 | DF | NOR | Fredrik Flo (out of retirement) |
| 5 | DF | NOR | Kristoffer Lassen Harrison (on loan from Moss) |
| 7 | MF | NOR | Harald Woxen (on loan from Lillestrøm) |
| 8 | MF | NOR | Lukas Gausdal (on loan from Start) |
| 9 | FW | NGR | Kparobo Arierhi (on loan from Lillestrøm) |
| 14 | DF | GHA | Jamal Deen Haruna (loan return from Sandnes Ulf) |
| 30 | FW | NOR | Sverre Stavø (promoted from junior squad) |
| 35 | DF | NOR | Emil Lunde Hillestad (promoted from junior squad) |

Out: Note: Flags indicate national team as defined under FIFA eligibility rules; some limited exceptions apply. Players may hold more than one non-FIFA nationality.

| No. | Pos. | Nation | Player |
|---|---|---|---|
| 5 | DF | NOR | Sander Aske Granheim (to Start) |
| 7 | FW | NOR | Sebastian Pedersen (to (South Africa) Orlando Pirates) |
| 8 | MF | NOR | Jacob Blixt Flaten (to KFUM) |
| 11 | FW | ERI | Oliver Hintsa (to (Romania) Dinamo Bucuresti) |
| 21 | GK | NOR | Daniel Gjerde Sætren (on loan to Lysekloster) |
| 36 | MF | NOR | Marius Årøy (on loan to Lysekloster) |

=== Stabæk ===
In: Note: Flags indicate national team as defined under FIFA eligibility rules; some limited exceptions apply. Players may hold more than one non-FIFA nationality.

| No. | Pos. | Nation | Player |
|---|---|---|---|
| 12 | GK | NOR | Leander Gunnerød (loan return from Eik-Tønsberg) |
| 17 | MF | NOR | Gaute Vetti (free transfer) |
| 20 | FW | SWE | Gottfrid Rapp (on loan from (Sweden) Elfsborg) |
| 21 | MF | NOR | Fredrik Krogstad (from (Denmark) Hvidovre) |
| 28 | MF | NOR | Danilo Dos Santos Jonker (from Eik Tønsberg) |
| 34 | MF | NOR | Lucas Myklebust (promoted from junior squad) |

Out: Note: Flags indicate national team as defined under FIFA eligibility rules; some limited exceptions apply. Players may hold more than one non-FIFA nationality.

| No. | Pos. | Nation | Player |
|---|---|---|---|
| 20 | MF | DEN | Oskar Boesen (loan return to (Denmark) Silkeborg) |
| 21 | MF | NOR | Kristian Lønstad Onsrud (on loan to Raufoss) |
| 28 | MF | NOR | Brage Tobiassen (to KFUM) |

=== Strømmen ===
In: Note: Flags indicate national team as defined under FIFA eligibility rules; some limited exceptions apply. Players may hold more than one non-FIFA nationality.

| No. | Pos. | Nation | Player |
|---|---|---|---|
| 11 | FW | NOR | Markus Wæhler (on loan from Lillestrøm) |
| 17 | DF | NOR | Leon Sethi (from Kongsvinger 2) |
| 18 | MF | NOR | Mathias Svenningsen-Grønn (on loan from Sarpsborg 08) |
| 25 | DF | SWE | Pontus Lindgren (from (Finland) IFK Mariehamn) |
| 26 | MF | NCA | Matias Moldskred (from (Vietnam) Thanh Hoa) |
| 27 | FW | NGR | Terry Benjamin (on loan from Start) |
| 28 | DF | NOR | Nikolai Eide Ohr (from Træff) |
| 29 | FW | SLO | Gal Grobelnik (from (Germany) SGV Heilbronn-Freiberg) |

Out: Note: Flags indicate national team as defined under FIFA eligibility rules; some limited exceptions apply. Players may hold more than one non-FIFA nationality.

| No. | Pos. | Nation | Player |
|---|---|---|---|
| 9 | FW | NOR | Nikolai Hristov (to Tromsø) |
| 17 | DF | NOR | Deni Dashaev (loan return to Start) |
| 18 | FW | NOR | Luka Fajfric (to Bryne) |
| 20 | MF | NOR | Haniel Samson (loan return to Vålerenga 2) |
| 23 | DF | NOR | Sverre Nilsen (on loan to Skedsmo) |
| 77 | MF | SWE | Ludvig Nåvik (to (Sweden) GIF Sundsvall) |

=== Strømsgodset ===
In: Note: Flags indicate national team as defined under FIFA eligibility rules; some limited exceptions apply. Players may hold more than one non-FIFA nationality.

| No. | Pos. | Nation | Player |
|---|---|---|---|
| 17 | MF | DEN | Jonathan Moalem (on loan from (Denmark) FC København) |
| 23 | FW | NOR | Erik Ingebrethsen (from (Portugal) Sporting U20) |
| 27 | FW | NOR | Ivan Gosik (on loan from Molde) |
| 39 | FW | NOR | Mats Spiten (promoted from junior squad) |
| 45 | DF | NOR | Sean Healy Andresen (promoted from junior squad) |

Out: Note: Flags indicate national team as defined under FIFA eligibility rules; some limited exceptions apply. Players may hold more than one non-FIFA nationality.

| No. | Pos. | Nation | Player |
|---|---|---|---|
| 4 | DF | NOR | Aleksander van der Spa (on loan to Raufoss) |
| 27 | DF | NOR | Tobias Bjørnstad (to (Malta) Ħamrun Spartans) |
| 27 | FW | NOR | Ivan Gosik (loan return to Molde) |
| 37 | MF | NOR | Samuel Silalahi (on loan to Grorud) |
| 99 | FW | GHA | James Ampofo (to (Denmark) Esbjerg, previously on loan at Start) |

=== Åsane ===
In: Note: Flags indicate national team as defined under FIFA eligibility rules; some limited exceptions apply. Players may hold more than one non-FIFA nationality.

| No. | Pos. | Nation | Player |
|---|---|---|---|
| 18 | MF | ISL | Breki Baldursson (on loan from (Denmark) Esbjerg) |
| 19 | FW | NOR | Joakim Aasen (promoted from junior squad) |
| 21 | | NOR | Amund Fossum Sundsøy (promoted from junior squad) |
| 23 | FW | NOR | Gabriel Ramsay (from Austevoll) |
| 24 | GK | NOR | Storm Strand-Kolbjørnsen (on loan from Start) |
| 24 | GK | NOR | Mathias Klausen (on loan from Brann) |
| 27 | FW | NOR | Luka Aaker-Saldanha (promoted from junior squad) |
| 30 | FW | NOR | Erling Myklebust (from (Canada) Atletico Ottawa) |
| 95 | GK | NOR | Johannes Kvammen (promoted from junior squad) |

Out: Note: Flags indicate national team as defined under FIFA eligibility rules; some limited exceptions apply. Players may hold more than one non-FIFA nationality.

| No. | Pos. | Nation | Player |
|---|---|---|---|
| 18 | MF | NOR | Ole Kallevåg (to Lyn) |
| 19 | FW | NOR | Joakim Aasen (on loan to Sandviken) |
| 24 | GK | NOR | Peder Hoel Lervik (loan return to Molde) |
| 24 | GK | NOR | Storm Strand-Kolbjørnsen (loan return to Start) |
| 44 | FW | NOR | Marius Nordal (loan return to Start) |
