= List of Norwegian football transfers winter 2025–26 =

This is a list of Norwegian football transfers in the 2025–26 winter transfer window by club. Only clubs of the 2026 Eliteserien and 2026 Norwegian First Division are included.

== Eliteserien ==
=== Aalesund ===
In: Note: Flags indicate national team as defined under FIFA eligibility rules; some limited exceptions apply. Players may hold more than one non-FIFA nationality.

No.	Pos.	Nation	Player
1	GK	NOR	Kristoffer Klaesson (from Viking)
14	DF	NGR	Uba Charles Nwokoma (from Lillestrøm)
15	FW	NOR	Endre Osenbroch (from Sandnes Ulf)
18	MF	NOR	Elias Hagen (on loan from Vålerenga)
20	FW	CMR	Ivan Djantou (from (Denmark) SønderjyskE)
22	DF	SWE	Emil Engqvist (from (Sweden) Sandviken)
25	DF	NOR	Ulrik Syversen (from Brattvåg)
27	FW	NOR	Marcus Reed (promoted from junior squad)
—	DF	NOR	Nicholas Alme Bakke (loan return from Volda)

Out: Note: Flags indicate national team as defined under FIFA eligibility rules; some limited exceptions apply. Players may hold more than one non-FIFA nationality.

No.	Pos.	Nation	Player
1	GK	NOR	Sten Grytebust (retired)
15	DF	NOR	Nikolai Skuseth (loan return to Sarpsborg 08)
19	FW	DEN	Frederik Heiselberg (to (Denmark) Hillerød)
23	DF	NOR	Erik Frøysa (on loan to Raufoss)
25	DF	NOR	John Kitolano (to Lillestrøm)
28	MF	NOR	Eivind Kolve (on loan to Brattvåg, previously on loan at Jerv, then to Brattvåg again)
29	DF	NOR	Jørgen Bøe (on loan to Træff)
36	MF	NOR	Tellef Ytterland (to Levanger)
—	FW	DEN	Alexander Ammitzbøll (to (Denmark) Esbjerg)

=== Bodø/Glimt ===
In: Note: Flags indicate national team as defined under FIFA eligibility rules; some limited exceptions apply. Players may hold more than one non-FIFA nationality.

No.	Pos.	Nation	Player
17	FW	NOR	Ola Brynhildsen (from (Denmark) Midtjylland, previously on loan)
94	FW	NOR	August Mikkelsen (loan return from Tromsø)

Out: Note: Flags indicate national team as defined under FIFA eligibility rules; some limited exceptions apply. Players may hold more than one non-FIFA nationality.

No.	Pos.	Nation	Player
18	DF	NOR	Brede Moe (retired)
30	FW	DEN	Mathias Jørgensen (to (England) Blackburn Rovers)
44	GK	NOR	Magnus Brøndbo (to (Italy) Delfino Pescara)
–	FW	SWE	Samuel Burakovsky (on loan to (Sweden) Öster, previously on loan at (Denmark) Kolding)
18	FW	DEN	Kasper Høgh (to (Scotland) Celtic)

=== Brann ===
In: Note: Flags indicate national team as defined under FIFA eligibility rules; some limited exceptions apply. Players may hold more than one non-FIFA nationality.

No.	Pos.	Nation	Player
2	DF	NOR	Martin Hellan (loan return from Stabæk)
6	DF	SEN	Cheikh Mbacke Diop (from (Croatia) Lokomotiva Zagreb)
7	FW	ISL	Jon Dagur Thorsteinsson (on loan from (Germany) Hertha BSC)
10	FW	ISL	Kristall Máni Ingason (from (Denmark) Sønderjyske)
12	GK	NOR	Simen Vidtun Nilsen (from Ranheim)
16	MF	NOR	Kristian Eriksen (from Molde)
26	FW	WAL	Rabbi Matondo (from (Scotland) Rangers)
39	FW	NOR	Julian Lægreid (promoted from junior squad)
43	DF	NOR	Rasmus Holten (loan return from Sogndal)

Out: Note: Flags indicate national team as defined under FIFA eligibility rules; some limited exceptions apply. Players may hold more than one non-FIFA nationality.

No.	Pos.	Nation	Player
6	DF	DEN	Japhet Sery Larsen (to (United States) Philadelphia Union)
7	FW	DEN	Mads Hansen (to (Sweden) Brommapojkarna)
10	MF	DEN	Emil Kornvig (to (Poland) Widzew Łódź)
12	GK	NED	Tom Bramel (on loan to (Netherlands) RKC Waalwijk)
24	GK	NOR	Mathias Klausen (on loan to Sandviken)
26	DF	NOR	Eivind Helland (to (Italy) Bologna)
27	MF	NOR	Mads Berg Sande (to Kongsvinger)
39	FW	NOR	Julian Lægreid (on loan to Moss)
40	MF	NOR	Jesper Eikrem (on loan to Åsane)
41	MF	NOR	Lars Remmem (on loan to Haugesund)

=== Fredrikstad ===
In: Note: Flags indicate national team as defined under FIFA eligibility rules; some limited exceptions apply. Players may hold more than one non-FIFA nationality.

No.	Pos.	Nation	Player
3	DF	NOR	Aleksander Andresen (from Stabæk)
4	DF	NOR	Fredrik Holmé (from Kongsvinger)
6	MF	SWE	Samuel Leach Holm (from (Sweden) Häcken)
14	GK	SWE	Max Nilsson (from (Sweden) Landskrona)
18	DF	NOR	Jonathan Vonheim Norbye (on loan from (Germany) RB Leipzig U20)
26	DF	NOR	Joakim Nysveen (from Stabæk)
27	DF	CMR	Chris Pondy (from (Cameroon) Dauphine ASC)

Out: Note: Flags indicate national team as defined under FIFA eligibility rules; some limited exceptions apply. Players may hold more than one non-FIFA nationality.

No.	Pos.	Nation	Player
4	DF	NOR	Stian Stray Molde (to Hhaugesund)
11	MF	CAN	Patrick Metcalfe (to Hamkam)
14	MF	FRO	Jóannes Bjartalíð (to (Kazakhstan) Kyzylzhar)
18	DF	NOR	Ludvig Begby (released)
22	DF	GHA	Maxwell Woledzi (to (United States) Nashville SC)
24	MF	NOR	Torjus Engebakken (on loan to Raufoss)
31	MF	NOR	Elias Solberg (to Ranheim)
32	DF	NOR	Jesper Solberg (to Mjøndalen)
90	GK	DEN	Valdemar Birksø (to (Denmark) Fredericia)
–	DF	NOR	Imre Bech Hermansen (to Kråkerøy, previously on loan at Kjelsås)

=== HamKam ===
In: Note: Flags indicate national team as defined under FIFA eligibility rules; some limited exceptions apply. Players may hold more than one non-FIFA nationality.

No.	Pos.	Nation	Player
2	DF	NOR	Martin Gjone (from Sandefjord)
10	MF	SUI	Loris Mettler (from Sandefjord)
15	DF	NOR	Ilir Kukleci (from Haugesund)
16	DF	NOR	Anders Trondsen (from (Sweden) IFK Göteborg)
19	FW	NOR	Henrik Udahl (loan return from KFUM)
21	MF	SWE	Noah Alexandersson (from Moss)
24	DF	USA	Ian Hoffmann (on loan from (Poland) Lech Poznan)
26	MF	CAN	Patrick Metcalfe (from Fredrikstad)
27	DF	POR	João Barros (from Moss)
29	FW	SEN	Mame Alassane Niang (on loan from Lyn)
33	GK	NOR	Simon Rusen (promoted from junior squad)

Out: Note: Flags indicate national team as defined under FIFA eligibility rules; some limited exceptions apply. Players may hold more than one non-FIFA nationality.

No.	Pos.	Nation	Player
2	DF	SWE	Gustav Granath (to (Greece) Panetolikos)
10	FW	NOR	Moses Mawa (to (Romania) Sepsi OSK)
11	MF	NOR	Tore André Sørås (to KFUM)
16	FW	NOR	Pål Alexander Kirkevold (to Flint)
19	FW	NOR	Kristian Lien (loan return to (Netherlands) Groningen)
24	FW	KOS	Ylldren Ibrahimaj (to Lillestrøm)
25	DF	VEN	David de Ornelas (on loan to Raufoss)
26	MF	NOR	Mats Pedersen (on loan to (Finland) FF Jaro)
29	MF	NOR	Olav Mengshoel (on loan to Eidsvold Turn)
30	GK	SWE	Alexander Nilsson (to (Sweden) Rosengård)
34	DF	NOR	Mads Orrhaug Larsen (on loan to Raufoss)

=== KFUM ===
In: Note: Flags indicate national team as defined under FIFA eligibility rules; some limited exceptions apply. Players may hold more than one non-FIFA nationality.

No.	Pos.	Nation	Player
4	DF	GAM	Momodou Lion Njie (loan return from Sarpsborg 08)
9	MF	NOR	Martin Vinjor (from Kongsvinger)
12	GK	POL	Krzysztof Bąkowski (on loan from (Poland) Lech Poznań)
15		NOR	Magnus K. Mehl (promoted from junior squad)
18	FW	NOR	Rasmus Eggen Vinge (from Stabæk)
19	MF	NOR	Eirik Saunes (from Bryne)
20	MF	NOR	Mostafa Najafzadeh (from Vålerenga 2)
21	MF	NOR	Sander Sjøkvist (from Start)
23	MF	NOR	Magnus Wolff Eikrem (from Molde)
25	GK	NOR	Håvar Grøntvedt Jenssen (from Sarpsborg 08)
27	MF	NOR	Tore André Sørås (from Hamkam)
28	MF	NOR	Magnus Grødem (from (Switzerland) Yverdon-Sport)
30	MF	NOR	Marko Vuckovic (promoted from junior squad)
31	GK	NOR	Darian Weber Mink (promoted from junior squad)

Out: Note: Flags indicate national team as defined under FIFA eligibility rules; some limited exceptions apply. Players may hold more than one non-FIFA nationality.

No.	Pos.	Nation	Player
9	FW	NOR	Henrik Udahl (loan return to HamKam)
12	GK	NOR	William Da Rocha (to Kongsvinger)
15	DF	NOR	Mathias Tønnessen (to Tromsø)
15		NOR	Magnus K. Mehl (on loan to Tromsdalen)
19	FW	NOR	Niclas Schjøth Semmen (to Moss)
20	FW	SOM	Yasir Sa'ad (to Rana, previously on loan at Skeid)
21	FW	NOR	Sondre Spieler Halvorsen (to Tromsdalen)
23	DF	NOR	Mohammed Hopsdal Abbas (to Eik-Tønsberg, previously on loan at Strømmen)
25	MF	NOR	Sverre Sandal (to (England) Luton Town)
26	DF	NOR	Joachim Prent-Eckbo (on loan to Brattvåg, previously on loan at Asker)
28	FW	SEN	Mame Mor Ndiaye (to (China) Foshan Nanshi)
31	GK	NOR	Henri Sørlie (to Stabæk 2)

=== Kristiansund ===
In: Note: Flags indicate national team as defined under FIFA eligibility rules; some limited exceptions apply. Players may hold more than one non-FIFA nationality.

No.	Pos.	Nation	Player
4	DF	ISL	Júlíus Mar Júlíusson (from (Iceland) KR)
6	MF	NOR	Jesper Isaksen (from Stabæk)
10	MF	NOR	Heine Gikling Bruseth (from (United States) San Diego FC)
13	DF	DEN	Alexander Munksgaard (from (Czech Republic) Baník Ostrava)
15	DF	NOR	Nikolai Skuseth (on loan from Sarpsborg 08)
18	FW	NGR	Promise Meliga (on loan from Vålerenga)
23	MF	NOR	Tobias Svendsen (from Odd)
31	MF	NOR	Herman Sjåvik Opsahl (promoted from junior squad)
77	FW	ISL	Hrannar Snær Magnusson (from (Iceland) Afturelding)

Out: Note: Flags indicate national team as defined under FIFA eligibility rules; some limited exceptions apply. Players may hold more than one non-FIFA nationality.

No.	Pos.	Nation	Player
4	DF	NOR	Marius Olsen (to (Poland) GKS Katowice)
8	MF	SWE	Henry Sletsjøe (loan return to Rosenborg)
10	MF	DEN	Rezan Corlu (to (Denmark) Hillerød)
11	FW	NOR	Franklin Nyenetue (on loan to Ranheim, previously on loan at Egersund)
14	DF	NOR	Axel Kryger (to Sandnes Ulf)
15	DF	NOR	Mikkel Rakneberg (to (Germany) VfL Bochum)
21	DF	SRB	Igor Jeličić (on loan to (Serbia) Napredak Kruševac)
22	DF	USA	Ian Hoffmann (loan return to (Poland) Lech Poznan)
24	FW	NOR	Awet Alemseged (to Grorud, previously on loan at Stjørdals-Blink)
25	FW	SEN	Alioune Ndour (loan return to (Belgium) Zulte Waregem)
26	GK	NOR	Knut-André Skjærstein (to Strømmen)
29	FW	NOR	Marius Weidel (released)
34	MF	NOR	Andreas Bakeng-Rogne (to Pors, previously on loan)
35	DF	NOR	Isak Hagen Aalberg (on loan to Mjøndalen, previously on loan at Hønefoss)

=== Lillestrøm ===
In: Note: Flags indicate national team as defined under FIFA eligibility rules; some limited exceptions apply. Players may hold more than one non-FIFA nationality.

No.	Pos.	Nation	Player
3	DF	NOR	Sturla Ottesen (free transfer)
9	FW	NGR	Kparobo Arierhi (loan return from Mjøndalen)
12	GK	SWE	Pontus Dahlberg (from (Sweden) IFK Göteborg)
14	MF	NOR	Gustav Nyheim (from Molde)
19	MF	SWE	Camil Jebara (from (Sweden) Elfsborg)
22	DF	NOR	John Kitolano (from Aalesund)
23	DF	NOR	Ulrik Yttergård Jenssen (on loan from Rosenborg)
27	FW	NOR	Markus Wæhler (loan return from Mjøndalen)
29	FW	KOS	Ylldren Ibrahimaj (from Hamkam)
31	FW	GRE	Angelos Chaminta (promoted from junior squad)
—	MF	NGR	Efe Lucky (loan return from Åsane)

Out: Note: Flags indicate national team as defined under FIFA eligibility rules; some limited exceptions apply. Players may hold more than one non-FIFA nationality.

No.	Pos.	Nation	Player
6	MF	NOR	Vebjørn Hoff (to Molde)
12	GK	NOR	Mads Hedenstad Christiansen (to (Denmark) AGF)
14	FW	ENG	Jubril Adedeji (loan return to (Denmark) AaB)
19	DF	NOR	Kristoffer Tønnessen (to Start)
21	DF	NGR	Tochukwu Ogboji (on loan to Strømmen, previously on loan at Mjøndalen)
23	MF	NOR	Gjermund Åsen (to Ranheim)
25	MF	NOR	Leandro Neto (to Brattvåg, previously on loan at Skeid)
30	DF	NOR	Lucas Svenningsen (on loan to Tromsdalen)
33	FW	SEN	Moctar Diop (to (Belgium) Gent)
64	DF	SWE	Eric Larsson (to (Sweden) Gefle)
90	FW	NOR	El Schaddai Furaha (released, previously on loan at Ull/Kisa)
–	DF	NGR	Uba Charles Nwokoma (to Aalesund, previously on loan at (Sweden) Mjällby)

=== Molde ===
In: Note: Flags indicate national team as defined under FIFA eligibility rules; some limited exceptions apply. Players may hold more than one non-FIFA nationality.

No.	Pos.	Nation	Player
1	GK	DEN	Mads Kikkenborg (from (Belgium) Anderlecht)
4	DF	NOR	Sivert Sira Hansen (from Start)
9	FW	GHA	Jalal Abdullai (from (Sweden) Elfsborg, previously on loan)
15	MF	NOR	Vebjørn Hoff (from Lillestrøm)
22	GK	POL	Albert Posiadała (loan return from (Turkey) Samsunspor)
24	FW	IRL	Trent Koné-Doherty (from (England) Liverpool Academy)
27	DF	NOR	Fredrik Kristensen Dahl (from Strømsgodset)
28	MF	DEN	Viktor Bender (from (Denmark) OB)
31	MF	NOR	Blerton Isufi (loan return from Sandefjord)
32	GK	NOR	Mads Eikrem Myklebust (loan return from Strømsgodset)
34	MF	NOR	Mathias Silseth Mork (promoted from junior squad)

Out: Note: Flags indicate national team as defined under FIFA eligibility rules; some limited exceptions apply. Players may hold more than one non-FIFA nationality.

No.	Pos.	Nation	Player
1	GK	NOR	Jacob Karlstrøm (to (Cyprus) Anorthosis Famagusta)
6	MF	NOR	Alwande Roaldsøy (to (Netherlands) Sparta Rotterdam)
7	MF	NOR	Magnus Wolff Eikrem (to KFUM)
12	GK	NOR	Peder Hoel Lervik (on loan to Åsane, previously on loan at Træff)
20	MF	NOR	Kristian Eriksen (to Brann)
24	DF	NED	Neraysho Kasanwirjo (loan return to (Netherlands) Feyenoord)
29	MF	NOR	Gustav Nyheim (to Lillestrøm)
30	FW	NOR	Leon-Robin Juberg-Hovland (to Kongsvinger, previously on loan at Træff)
31	MF	NOR	Andreas Myklebust (to Brattvåg, previously on loan at Træff)
32	GK	NOR	Mads Eikrem Myklebust (on loan to Strømsgodset, previously on loan at Hødd)
34	GK	IRL	Sean McDermott (retired)
34	MF	NOR	Mathias Silseth Mork (on loan to Træff)
36	DF	NOR	Filip Kristoffersen (to Træff, previously on loan at Notodden)

=== Rosenborg ===
In: Note: Flags indicate national team as defined under FIFA eligibility rules; some limited exceptions apply. Players may hold more than one non-FIFA nationality.

No.	Pos.	Nation	Player
1	GK	SWE	Leopold Wahlstedt (from (Denmark) AGF)
2	DF	NOR	Håkon Røsten (loan return from Ranheim)
17	MF	DEN	Mads Bomholt (from (Denmark) AaB)
18	FW	ALG	Amin Chiakha (on loan from (Denmark) F.C. Copenhagen)
20	MF	NOR	Aleksander Borgersen (promoted from junior squad)
22	DF	NOR	Jonas Svensson (from (Turkey) Beşiktaş)
24	GK	NOR	Haakon Ingdal Sørum (promoted from junior squad)
25	MF	NOR	Johan Bakke (from Strømsgodset)
26	DF	NOR	Ulrik Hald-Hernes (promoted from junior squad)
28	MF	NOR	Elias Slørdal (promoted from junior squad)
55	DF	NOR	Elias Sandrød (promoted from junior squad)
56	MF	NOR	Isak Holmen (promoted from junior squad)
57	FW	NOR	Daniel Thorstensen (promoted from junior squad)

Out: Note: Flags indicate national team as defined under FIFA eligibility rules; some limited exceptions apply. Players may hold more than one non-FIFA nationality.

No.	Pos.	Nation	Player
1	GK	NOR	Sander Tangvik (to (Germany) Hamburger SV)
2	DF	NOR	Erlend Dahl Reitan (to Start)
4	DF	DEN	Luka Racic (to (Lithuania) Kauno Žalgiris, previously on loan at (Denmark) Lyngby)
5	MF	PLE	Moustafa Zeidan (loan return to (Sweden) Malmö FF)
9	FW	NOR	Ole Sæter (to Vålerenga)
23	DF	NOR	Ulrik Yttergård Jenssen (on loan to Lillestrøm)
29	FW	NOR	Oscar Aga (to Moss, previously on loan at (Sweden) Helsingborg)
30	FW	NOR	Magnus Holte (on loan to (Sweden) Norrby, previously on loan at Hødd)
55	DF	NOR	Elias Sandrød (on loan to Stjørdals-Blink)
56	MF	NOR	Isak Holmen (on loan to Levanger)
—	MF	SWE	Henry Sletsjøe (to (Sweden) GAIS, previously on loan at Kristiansund)

=== Sandefjord ===
In: Note: Flags indicate national team as defined under FIFA eligibility rules; some limited exceptions apply. Players may hold more than one non-FIFA nationality.

No.	Pos.	Nation	Player
5	DF	DEN	Gustav Højbjerg (from (Denmark) B 93)
10	MF	NOR	Ruben Alte (on loan from Viking)
11	FW	SWE	Nikolaj Möller (from (Scotland) Dundee United)
16	DF	NOR	Håkon Krogelien (from Jerv)
17	FW	GHA	Foster Apetorgbor (from (Ghana) Africa Vikings)
37	MF	DEN	Jakob Vester (from (Denmark) Viborg)
44	DF	BEL	Xander Lambrix (from (Netherlands) TOP Oss)

Out: Note: Flags indicate national team as defined under FIFA eligibility rules; some limited exceptions apply. Players may hold more than one non-FIFA nationality.

No.	Pos.	Nation	Player
5	DF	NOR	Aleksander van der Spa (to Strømsgodset)
9	FW	NOR	Jacob Hanstad (to Stabæk)
10	MF	SUI	Loris Mettler (to Hamkam)
11	MF	NOR	Blerton Isufi (loan return to Molde)
13	GK	FIN	Carljohan Eriksson (loan return to Sarpsborg 08)
17	DF	NOR	Christopher Cheng (to (Poland) Widzew Łódź)
18	MF	SWE	Filip Ottosson (to (Sweden) IFK Göteborg)
22	DF	NOR	Martin Gjone (to HamKam)
23	FW	ISL	Stefán Ingi Sigurðarson (to (Netherlands) Go Ahead Eagles)
25	FW	NOR	Storm Bugge Pettersen (to (Faroe Islands) HB, previously on loan at Eik)
28	DF	NOR	Theodor Martin Agelin (on loan to Jerv)
43	FW	SWE	Elias Jemal (on loan to (Sweden) IFK Norrköping, previously on loan at Start)
—	GK	BIH	Alem Omerinović (to Sandar)

=== Sarpsborg 08 ===
In: Note: Flags indicate national team as defined under FIFA eligibility rules; some limited exceptions apply. Players may hold more than one non-FIFA nationality.

No.	Pos.	Nation	Player
12	DF	NOR	Claus Niyukuri (from Haugesund)
13	GK	FIN	Carljohan Eriksson (loan return from Sandefjord)
17	FW	SWE	Noa Williams (from Kongsvinger)
24	DF	NOR	Sigurd Rosted (from (Canada) Toronto)
26	MF	CIV	Chris Kouakou (from (Azerbaijan) Qarabağ)
77	FW	MAR	Camil Mmaee (from (Netherlands) MVV)
87	GK	NOR	Leander Øy (loan return from Mjøndalen)

Out: Note: Flags indicate national team as defined under FIFA eligibility rules; some limited exceptions apply. Players may hold more than one non-FIFA nationality.

No.	Pos.	Nation	Player
3	DF	IRQ	Mohanad Jeahze (released)
3	DF	NOR	Nikolai Skuseth (on loan to Kristiansund, previously on loan at Aalesund)
4	DF	NOR	Anders Trondsen (loan return to (Sweden) IFK Göteborg)
7	FW	NOR	Alagie Sanyang (to Stabæk)
10	MF	NOR	Harald Nilsen Tangen (on loan to (England) Notts County)
12	GK	NOR	Tord Flolid (loan return to Sandnes Ulf)
17	MF	NOR	Heine Gikling Bruseth (loan return to (United States) San Diego FC)
19	FW	ISL	Sveinn Aron Guðjohnsen (to (Italy) Cavese)
23	FW	NOR	Niklas Sandberg (to Haugesund)
25	MF	NOR	Jesper Gregersen (on loan to Egersund, previously on loan at Bryne)
26	FW	NGR	Daniel Job (to Kongsvinger)
27	DF	GAM	Momodou Lion Njie (loan return to KFUM)
77	DF	NOR	Adam Kaszuba (on loan to Kvik Halden, previously on loan at Notodden)
82	MF	NGR	Malik Olatunji (loan return to (Nigeria) Imperial)

=== Start ===
In: Note: Flags indicate national team as defined under FIFA eligibility rules; some limited exceptions apply. Players may hold more than one non-FIFA nationality.

No.	Pos.	Nation	Player
4	DF	DEN	Johan Meyer (from (Denmark) Lyngby)
7	FW	NOR	Alexander Gurendal (from (Spain) Valencia Mestalla)
17	FW	DEN	Jesper Cornelius (from (Denmark) Lyngby)
19	DF	NOR	Kristoffer Tønnessen (from Lillestrøm)
21	FW	NOR	Felix Kutsche Eriksen (from Våg)
22	FW	GHA	James Ampofo (on loan from Strømsgodset)
23	MF	NOR	Erlend Segberg (from (Italy) Trapani)
26	GK	NOR	Jasper Silva Torkildsen (loan return from Strømsgodset)
27	DF	NOR	Ousmane Diallo Toure (from Skeid)
29	DF	NOR	Erlend Dahl Reitan (from Rosenborg)

Out: Note: Flags indicate national team as defined under FIFA eligibility rules; some limited exceptions apply. Players may hold more than one non-FIFA nationality.

No.	Pos.	Nation	Player
4	DF	NOR	Sivert Sira Hansen (to Molde)
9	FW	NGR	Ahmed Adebayo (on loan to (Malta) Valletta)
12	DF	NOR	Deni Dashaev (on loan to Strømmen)
15	FW	NOR	Marius Nordal (on loan to Åsane)
17	DF	NOR	Benjamin Sundo (to Mjøndalen)
21	MF	NOR	Sander Sjøkvist (to KFUM)
21	FW	NOR	Felix Kutsche Eriksen (on loan to Arendal)
22	MF	NOR	Adrian Eftestad Nilsen (to Arendal, previously on loan)
27	FW	SWE	Elias Jemal (loan return to Sandefjord)
29	FW	LBR	Emmanuel Gono (loan return to (Sweden) AIK)
31	FW	NOR	Jonas Seim (on loan to Pors, previously on loan at Fløy)
–	FW	NOR	Sander Richardsen (to Lørenskog, previously on loan at Fløy)

=== Tromsø ===
In: Note: Flags indicate national team as defined under FIFA eligibility rules; some limited exceptions apply. Players may hold more than one non-FIFA nationality.

No.	Pos.	Nation	Player
3	DF	NOR	Mathias Tønnessen (from KFUM)
7	FW	NOR	Lars Olden Larsen (from (Netherlands) NEC, previously on loan)
8	MF	NOR	Jesper Grundt (from Kongsvinger)
10	MF	NOR	Troy Nyhammer (from Haugesund)
15	FW	SWE	Viktor Ekblom (from (Sweden) Falkenberg)
19	MF	NOR	Aleksander Elvebu (promoted from junior squad)
22	MF	NOR	Heine Åsen Larsen (loan return from Bryne)
27	MF	NOR	Mads Mikkelsen (promoted from junior squad)
32	GK	MTN	Abderrahmane Sarr (from (Mauritania) Nouakchott Kings)
92	MF	NOR	Johan Solstad-Nøis (promoted from junior squad)

Out: Note: Flags indicate national team as defined under FIFA eligibility rules; some limited exceptions apply. Players may hold more than one non-FIFA nationality.

No.	Pos.	Nation	Player
5	DF	NOR	Anders Jenssen (retired)
8	MF	NOR	Kent-Are Antonsen (to Strømsgodset, previously on at (Sweden) IFK Värnamo)
9	FW	POR	Ieltsin Camões (on loan to (Egypt) Al Ahly)
12	GK	CAN	Simon Thomas (released)
14	MF	NOR	Sigurd Prestmo (on loan to Moss)
15	FW	NOR	Vegard Erlien (to (Spain) Real Valladolid)
16	DF	FIN	Miika Koskela (to Haugesund, previously on loan)
17	FW	NOR	August Mikkelsen (loan return to Bodø/Glimt)
24	DF	NOR	Ruben Kristiansen (to Tromsdalen)
26	DF	NOR	Isak Vik (to Lyn, previously on loan at Mjøndalen)
32	GK	NOR	Mats Trige (to Lyn, previously on loan at Tromsdalen)
36	FW	NOR	Johannes Lilletun Elvebu (to Tromsdalen)
—	FW	NOR	Sean Nilsen-Modebe (on loan to Hødd, previously on loan at Tromsdalen)

=== Viking ===
In: Note: Flags indicate national team as defined under FIFA eligibility rules; some limited exceptions apply. Players may hold more than one non-FIFA nationality.

No.	Pos.	Nation	Player
15	MF	NOR	Ola Visted (loan return from Hødd)
30	GK	SVK	Ľubomír Belko (from (Slovakia) MŠK Žilina)
42	FW	GHA	Kelvin Frimpong (from (Ghana) African Vikings Academy)

Out: Note: Flags indicate national team as defined under FIFA eligibility rules; some limited exceptions apply. Players may hold more than one non-FIFA nationality.

No.	Pos.	Nation	Player
7	FW	NOR	Sander Svendsen (to (Turkey) Konyaspor)
8	MF	NOR	Ruben Alte (on loan to Sandefjord)
9	FW	AUS	Nicholas D'Agostino (on loan to (Australia) Brisbane Roar)
11	MF	NOR	Yann-Erik de Lanlay (to Sandnes Ulf)
12	GK	NOR	Magnus Rugland Ree (to Bryne, previously on loan at Åsane)
13	GK	NOR	Kristoffer Klaesson (to Aalesund)
32	MF	NOR	Kasper Sætherbø (to Egersund, previously on loan at Mjøndalen)
51	GK	NOR	Aksel Bergsvik (to Hødd, previously on loan at Sandviken)

=== Vålerenga ===
In: Note: Flags indicate national team as defined under FIFA eligibility rules; some limited exceptions apply. Players may hold more than one non-FIFA nationality.

No.	Pos.	Nation	Player
2	DF	ISL	Kolbeinn Finnsson (on loan from (Netherlands) Utrecht, then made permanent)
9	FW	NOR	Gabriel Rajkovic (promoted from junior squad)
15	MF	NOR	Odin Thiago Holm (on loan from (Scotland) Celtic)
21	GK	NOR	Magnus Sjøeng (loan return from Stabæk)
25	DF	GBS	Mario Gomes (on loan from (Guinea-Bissau) Bissau Stars Academy)
27	FW	DEN	Lucas Haren (from Kongsvinger)
28	MF	DEN	Magnus Westergaard (from (England) Wycombe Wanderers)
30	GK	NOR	Alexander Ordal (promoted from junior squad)
90	FW	NOR	Ole Sæter (from Rosenborg)

Out: Note: Flags indicate national team as defined under FIFA eligibility rules; some limited exceptions apply. Players may hold more than one non-FIFA nationality.

No.	Pos.	Nation	Player
1	GK	NOR	Jacob Storevik (to Ranheim)
9	FW	NED	Mees Rijks (to (England) Bristol Rovers, previously on loan at (Netherlands) De Graafschap)
14	FW	NGR	Obasi Onyebuchi (on loan to (Sweden) FC Stockholm)
15	MF	NOR	Elias Hagen (on loan to Aalesund)
16	DF	FIN	Noah Pallas (on loan to Ranheim)
19	FW	NGR	Promise Meliga (on loan to Kristiansund)
20	FW	NOR	Lorents Apold-Aasen (on loan to Skeid)
22	MF	NOR	Stian Sjøvold Thorstensen (on loan to Ranheim)
27	DF	BRA	Vinícius Nogueira (loan return to (Sweden) Halmstad)

== 1. divisjon ==
=== Bryne ===
In: Note: Flags indicate national team as defined under FIFA eligibility rules; some limited exceptions apply. Players may hold more than one non-FIFA nationality.

No.	Pos.	Nation	Player
1	GK	NOR	Magnus Rugland Ree (from Viking)
4	DF	NOR	Fabian Engedal (from Vindbjart)
14	DF	NOR	Anders Molund (from Mjøndalen)
15	DF	NOR	Kristoffer Hay (from Raufoss)
21	MF	NOR	David Aksnes (loan return from Hinna)
33	DF	NOR	Adrian Røragen Hermansen (from Junkeren)
77	MF	SWE	Paya Pichkah (from (Sweden) Brommapojkarna)

Out: Note: Flags indicate national team as defined under FIFA eligibility rules; some limited exceptions apply. Players may hold more than one non-FIFA nationality.

No.	Pos.	Nation	Player
1	GK	SWE	Anton Cajtoft (released)
2	DF	DEN	Andreas Skovgaard (to (Kosovo) Malisheva)
4	MF	NOR	Christian Landu Landu (released)
8	FW	NOR	Sanel Bojadzic (to Odd)
10	MF	NOR	Magnus Grødem (loan return to (Switzerland) Yverdon-Sport)
14	MF	NOR	Eirik Saunes (to KFUM)
15	DF	NOR	Jon-Helge Tveita (retired)
20	MF	NOR	Jesper Gregersen (loan return to Sarpsborg 08)
22	MF	NOR	Heine Åsen Larsen (loan return to Tromsø)
24	MF	DEN	Rasmus Thellufsen (released)
99	GK	LTU	Igor Spiridonov (on loan to Varhaug)
–	DF	NOR	Marius Mattingsdal (to Lysekloster, previously on loan at Levanger)

=== Egersund ===
In: Note: Flags indicate national team as defined under FIFA eligibility rules; some limited exceptions apply. Players may hold more than one non-FIFA nationality.

No.	Pos.	Nation	Player
6	MF	NOR	Kasper Sætherbø (from Viking)
11	FW	SWE	August Ljungberg (on loan from (Sweden) Sirius)
14	MF	NOR	Jan Inge Lynum (from Raufoss)
16	MF	NOR	Jostein Ekeland (from Strømsgodset)
17	DF	NOR	Sivert Westerlund (from Strømsgodset)
25	MF	NOR	Jesper Gregersen (on loan from Sarpsborg 08)
28	FW	NOR	Paweł Chrupałła (from (Sweden) Halmstad)
—	MF	SEN	Mactar Sylla (from (Senegal) Generation Foot)
—	DF	SEN	Ibrahima Diallo (from (Senegal) Generation Foot)

Out: Note: Flags indicate national team as defined under FIFA eligibility rules; some limited exceptions apply. Players may hold more than one non-FIFA nationality.

No.	Pos.	Nation	Player
1	GK	DEN	Andreas Hermansen (loan return to (Denmark) Horsens)
6	DF	NOR	Tord Salte (to Rosseland)
11	FW	NOR	Adrian Bergersen (to Vidar)
13	MF	SWE	Paya Pichkah (loan return to (Sweden) Brommapojkarna)
14	FW	NOR	Adrian Rogulj (to Raufoss)
16	MF	NOR	Ingvald Halgunset (retired)
19	FW	NGR	Samuel Adegbenro (released)
30	MF	FRO	Árni Nóa Atlason (loan return to (Faroe Islands) Vikingur Gøta)
45	MF	DEN	Mathias Sauer (to (Poland) Górnik Zabrze)
77	FW	NOR	Franklin Nyenetue (loan return to Kristiansund)

=== Haugesund ===
In: Note: Flags indicate national team as defined under FIFA eligibility rules; some limited exceptions apply. Players may hold more than one non-FIFA nationality.

No.	Pos.	Nation	Player
3	DF	NOR	Stian Stray Molde (from Fredrikstad)
4	DF	FIN	Miika Koskela (from Tromsø, previously on loan)
5	DF	DEN	Rasmus Møller (from (Denmark) Hillerød)
10	MF	NOR	Emir Derviskadic (loan return from (Sweden) Oddevold)
11	FW	NOR	Niklas Sandberg (from Sarpsborg 08)
14	MF	NOR	Sivert Heltne Nilsen (from (Scotland) Aberdeen)
26	DF	NOR	Eirik Viland Andersen (from Djerv 1919)}
41	MF	NOR	Lars Remmem (on loan from Brann)
46	MF	NOR	Fabian André Jakobsen (promoted from junior squad)

Out: Note: Flags indicate national team as defined under FIFA eligibility rules; some limited exceptions apply. Players may hold more than one non-FIFA nationality.

No.	Pos.	Nation	Player
2	DF	NOR	Claus Niyukuri (to Sarpsborg 08)
3	DF	FIN	Niko Hämäläinen (to (United States) New Mexico United)
4	DF	DEN	Mikkel Fischer (to (Denmark) Lyngby)
5	DF	NOR	Ilir Kukleci (to Hamkam)
10	MF	NOR	Troy Nyhammer (to Tromsø)
11	FW	NOR	Runar Espejord (released)
14	MF	NOR	Martin Samuelsen (released)
36	DF	NOR	Eivind Helgeland (released)
41		NOR	Mathias Myklebust (to Vard)
55	DF	SEN	Madiodio Dia (to (England) Portsmouth)
66	MF	CIV	Amidou Traoré (to (Saudi Arabia) Damac)

=== Hødd ===
In: Note: Flags indicate national team as defined under FIFA eligibility rules; some limited exceptions apply. Players may hold more than one non-FIFA nationality.

No.	Pos.	Nation	Player
1	GK	NOR	Thomas Kinn (from (Finland) AC Oulu)
9	FW	SWE	Cameron Streete (from (Sweden) Landskrona)
16	FW	DEN	Villum Dalsgaard (on loan from (Denmark) Nordsjælland U20)
18	MF	NOR	Ola Lerheim Olsen (from Fjøra)
19	FW	DEN	Sebastian Biller (on loan from (Denmark) Silkeborg)
20	FW	NOR	Sean Nilsen-Modebe (on loan from Tromsø)
25	GK	NOR	Aksel Bergsvik (from Viking)
27	DF	NOR	Gudmund Andresen (promoted from junior squad)

Out: Note: Flags indicate national team as defined under FIFA eligibility rules; some limited exceptions apply. Players may hold more than one non-FIFA nationality.

No.	Pos.	Nation	Player
1	GK	NOR	Ole Monrad Alme (to Hareid)
9	FW	NOR	Sebastian Haugland (to (Iceland) Þór)
18	MF	NOR	Ola Visted (loan return to Viking)
19	FW	NOR	Magnus Holte (loan return to Rosenborg)
20	MF	NOR	Johannes Konstali-Lødemel (to Lysekloster, previously on loan at Fjøra)
25	GK	NOR	Marius Ulla (to Stabæk)
26	GK	NOR	Mads Eikrem Myklebust (loan return to Molde)

=== Kongsvinger ===
In: Note: Flags indicate national team as defined under FIFA eligibility rules; some limited exceptions apply. Players may hold more than one non-FIFA nationality.

No.	Pos.	Nation	Player
1	GK	NOR	William Da Rocha (from KFUM)
2	DF	SWE	Victor Fors (from Raufoss)
6	DF	NOR	Adrian Aleksander Hansen (from Raufoss)
7	MF	BIH	Emin Pajić (from Vålerenga 2, previously on loan)
9	FW	SWE	Gabriel Johnson (from (Sweden) Hässleholms IF)
11	FW	NGR	Daniel Job (from Sarpsborg 08)
14	FW	NOR	Leon-Robin Juberg-Hovland (from Molde)
16	DF	NOR	Herman Udnæs (from Eidsvold Turn)
20	FW	NOR	Albert Sandstad (loan return from Eidsvold Turn)
27	MF	NOR	Mads Berg Sande (from Brann)

Out: Note: Flags indicate national team as defined under FIFA eligibility rules; some limited exceptions apply. Players may hold more than one non-FIFA nationality.

No.	Pos.	Nation	Player
1	GK	SWE	August Strömberg (retired)
2	DF	SWE	Joel Nilsson (to (Sweden) Halmstad)
5	DF	NOR	Fredrik Holmé (to Fredrikstad)
6	MF	NOR	Harald Holter (to (Denmark) Roskilde)
8	MF	NOR	Jesper Grundt (to Tromsø)
9	FW	DEN	Lucas Haren (to Vålerenga)
11	FW	SWE	Noa Williams (to Sarpsborg 08)
16	DF	NOR	Marius Trengereid (to Arendal, previously on loan)
18	FW	NOR	Joacim Holtan (to (Iceland) Afturelding)
23	MF	NOR	Martin Vinjor (to KFUM)
24	FW	NOR	Armand Øverby (on loan to Eidsvold Turn)
25	MF	NOR	Marius Øien Damhaug (to Eidsvold Turn, previously on loan)
26	MF	SWE	Wilhelm Ärlig (to (Sweden) Varberg)

=== Lyn ===
In: Note: Flags indicate national team as defined under FIFA eligibility rules; some limited exceptions apply. Players may hold more than one non-FIFA nationality.

No.	Pos.	Nation	Player
5	DF	NOR	Isak Vik (from Tromsø)
7	MF	TOG	Isaac Monglo (from (Togo) AC Barracuda)
20	MF	NOR	William Toft Wæhler (promoted from junior squad)
22	MF	SWE	William Kurtovic (from Eik-Tønsberg)
25	GK	NOR	Marcus Ellingsen Andersen (from Skeid)
26	FW	NOR	Ebrima Sawaneh (from Mjøndalen)
30	FW	SEN	Fallou Sock (from (Senegal) Diambars)
92	GK	NOR	Mats Trige (from Tromsø)

Out: Note: Flags indicate national team as defined under FIFA eligibility rules; some limited exceptions apply. Players may hold more than one non-FIFA nationality.

No.	Pos.	Nation	Player
2	DF	NOR	Jo Stålesen (to Jerv, previously on loan)
5	MF	NOR	Even Bydal (retired)
12	GK	NOR	Jesper Nesbakk Wold (to Kjelsås)
13	GK	NOR	Marius Devor Lunde (to Korsvoll)
17	DF	NOR	Davod Arzani (retired)
19	MF	NOR	Tobias Myhre (to Skeid)
25	MF	NOR	Malvin Ingebrigtsen (to Åsane)
26	MF	NOR	Ole Breistøl (retired)
28	FW	SEN	Mame Alassane Niang (on loan to Hamkam)
29	DF	SEN	Massiré Sylla (to (Belgium) Union Saint-Gilloise)
77	MF	NOR	Brage Hylen (on loan to Lørenskog)

=== Moss ===
In: Note: Flags indicate national team as defined under FIFA eligibility rules; some limited exceptions apply. Players may hold more than one non-FIFA nationality.

No.	Pos.	Nation	Player
7	FW	NOR	Julian Lægreid (on loan from Brann)
11	FW	NOR	Oscar Aga (from Rosenborg)
18	MF	NOR	Robert Marcus (from (Denmark) Helsingør)
20	FW	NOR	Niclas Schjøth Semmen (from KFUM)
23	FW	NOR	Robin Hermanstad (from Stjørdals-Blink)
24	DF	NOR	Wilmer Olofsson (on loan from (Sweden) AIK)
26	DF	NGR	Emmanuel Chidi (from (France) Dijon U20)
27	MF	NOR	Sigurd Prestmo (on loan from Tromsø)

Out: Note: Flags indicate national team as defined under FIFA eligibility rules; some limited exceptions apply. Players may hold more than one non-FIFA nationality.

No.	Pos.	Nation	Player
7	MF	SWE	Noah Alexandersson (to HamKam)
12	GK	NOR	Jarik Sundling (to Brattvåg)
14	MF	NOR	Altin Lajqi (to Råde, previously on loan at Stjørdals-Blink)
16	MF	NOR	Sondre Høydal (on loan to Drøbak-Frogn)
18	MF	SOM	Saadiq Elmi (to Raufoss)
20	FW	NOR	Kristoffer Sørensen (on loan to Hønefoss)
23	DF	POR	João Barros (to Hamkam)
24	DF	NOR	Markus Welinder (retired)
29	FW	NOR	Michee Mayonga (on loan to Råde)
47	FW	ITA	Leonardo Rossi (to Åsane)
49	FW	ANG	Benarfa (to (Angola) Kabuscorp)

=== Odd ===
In: Note: Flags indicate national team as defined under FIFA eligibility rules; some limited exceptions apply. Players may hold more than one non-FIFA nationality.

No.	Pos.	Nation	Player
2	DF	DEN	Jacob Buus (from (Denmark) Esbjerg)
6	DF	DEN	Jakob Vadstrup (from (Denmark) Kolding)
8	MF	SWE	Daniel Söderberg (from (Sweden) Sandviken)
9	FW	NOR	Sanel Bojadzic (from Bryne)
10	FW	DEN	Villads Rasmussen (from (Denmark) Hobro)
11	DF	NOR	Casper Glenna Andersen (loan return from Pors)
12	GK	NOR	Idar Lysgård (from (Sweden) Vasalund)
15	DF	NOR	Oliver Svenungsen Skau (promoted from junior squad)
24	GK	NOR	Storm Øines (promoted from junior squad)
27	MF	NOR	Kristian Rodgers Holte (promoted from junior squad)
28	FW	NOR	Faniel Tewelde (on loan from (Belgium) Lommel)

Out: Note: Flags indicate national team as defined under FIFA eligibility rules; some limited exceptions apply. Players may hold more than one non-FIFA nationality.

No.	Pos.	Nation	Player
1	GK	NOR	André Hansen (retired)
2	DF	NOR	Jørgen Sjøl (to Raufoss)
6	MF	NOR	Tobias Svendsen (to Kristiansund)
8	MF	NOR	Etzaz Hussain (retired)
9	FW	CMR	Ivan Djantou (loan return to (Denmark) SønderjyskE)
11	FW	NOR	Oliver Jordan Hagen (to (Sweden) Hammarby)
15	DF	NOR	Sondre Solholm Johansen (retired)
17	MF	NOR	Siver Haugen Murtnes (to Notodden)
21	DF	NOR	Steffen Hagen (retired)
22	FW	NOR	Torgeir Børven (to (Faroe Islands) B36)
29	FW	NOR	Rafik Zekhnini (to Raufoss)
36	MF	LBR	Justin Salmon (released)

=== Ranheim ===
In: Note: Flags indicate national team as defined under FIFA eligibility rules; some limited exceptions apply. Players may hold more than one non-FIFA nationality.

No.	Pos.	Nation	Player
1	GK	NOR	Jacob Storevik (from Vålerenga)
4	DF	NOR	Thomas Eeg Kongerud (from Eik Tønsberg)
5	DF	FIN	Noah Pallas (on loan from Vålerenga)
11	FW	SEN	Maurice Sylva (from (Senegal) Keur Madior)
12	GK	NOR	Oliver Madsen (from Åsane)
13	DF	NOR	Marius Valle Fagerhaug (promoted from junior squad)
15	FW	NOR	Franklin Nyenetue (on loan from Kristiansund)
20	FW	NOR	Andreas Fossli (from Stjørdals-Blink)
21	MF	NOR	Elias Solberg (from Fredrikstad)
23	MF	NOR	Gjermund Åsen (from Lillestrøm)
26	MF	NOR	Stian Sjøvold Thorstensen (on loan from Vålerenga)
28	DF	NOR	John Kenneth Gundersen (promoted from junior squad)

Out: Note: Flags indicate national team as defined under FIFA eligibility rules; some limited exceptions apply. Players may hold more than one non-FIFA nationality.

No.	Pos.	Nation	Player
1	GK	NOR	Simen Vidtun Nilsen (to Brann)
3	DF	NOR	Håkon Røsten (loan return to Rosenborg)
6	MF	NOR	Lucas Kolstad (on loan to Eidsvold Turn, previously on loan at Åsane)
7	MF	NOR	Per Ciljan Skjelbred (retired)
9	FW	NOR	Bendik Bye (retired)
10	FW	FRO	Áki Samuelsen (to (Sweden) Mjällby)
11	FW	NOR	Vetle Wenaas (to Jerv)
15	DF	NOR	Erik Tønne (retired)
17	MF	NOR	Dennis Torp-Helland (on loan to Trygg/Lade)
20	MF	NOR	Morten Konradsen (released)
23	FW	NOR	Elias Myrvågnes (on loan to Stjørdals-Blink)
30	GK	NOR	Tor Solvoll (released)

=== Raufoss ===
In: Note: Flags indicate national team as defined under FIFA eligibility rules; some limited exceptions apply. Players may hold more than one non-FIFA nationality.

No.	Pos.	Nation	Player
2	DF	NOR	Jørgen Sjøl (from Odd)
3	DF	NOR	Eirik Dahl Åsvestad (from Strømmen)
4	DF	NOR	Sebastian Gjelsvik (from Ull/Kisa)
5	DF	NOR	Eskil Furre Gjerde (from (United States) Drake Bulldogs)
6	DF	NOR	Erik Frøysa (on loan from Aalesund)
7	MF	NOR	Emil Sildnes (from Åsane)
8	MF	NOR	Torje Naustdal (from Skeid)
9	FW	NOR	Adrian Rogulj (from Egersund)
12	GK	NOR	David Synstelien (from Gamle Oslo)
13	MF	SWE	Alexander Achinioti-Jönsson (from (Canada) Forge)
15	DF	VEN	David de Ornelas (on loan from Hamkam)
16	DF	NOR	Mads Orrhaug Larsen (on loan from Hamkam)
18	MF	NOR	Torjus Engebakken (on loan from Fredrikstad)
20	MF	SOM	Saadiq Elmi (from Moss)
22	FW	NOR	Filip Fjeldheim da Silva (from Ull/Kisa)
27	FW	NOR	Rafik Zekhnini (from Odd)
30	FW	NOR	Jonas Dalen Korsaksel (loan return from Gjøvik-Lyn)

Out: Note: Flags indicate national team as defined under FIFA eligibility rules; some limited exceptions apply. Players may hold more than one non-FIFA nationality.

No.	Pos.	Nation	Player
3	DF	SWE	Rasmus Bonde (loan return to (Sweden) AIK)
4	DF	NOR	Adrian Aleksander Hansen (to Kongsvinger)
5	DF	NOR	Oliver Rotihaug (to Mjøndalen)
8	MF	ENG	Ryan Lee Nelson (to (Sweden) Norrköping)
9	FW	NOR	Erlend Hustad (to (Faroe Islands) KÍ)
12	GK	NOR	Petter Eichler Jensen (to Træff)
13	DF	BDI	Vaillance Nihorimbere (released)
14	MF	NOR	Jan Inge Lynum (to Egersund)
15	DF	NOR	Kristoffer Hay (to Bryne)
16	DF	NOR	Ole Amund Sveen (retired)
17	MF	NOR	Sander Nordbø (on loan to Jerv)
18	FW	GHA	Emmanuel Mensah (loan return to Sogndal)
20	FW	GAM	Momodou Bojang (to (Sweden) Lund)
22	DF	SWE	Victor Fors (to Kongsvinger)
24	FW	GAM	Kebba Badjie (to Jerv)
27	MF	NOR	Kristoffer Haukås Steinset (to Mjøndalen)
29	MF	NOR	Elias Sørum (on loan to Gjøvik-Lyn)
—	MF	NOR	Oskar Sangnes (on loan to Gjøvik-Lyn, previously on loan at Bærum)

=== Sandnes Ulf ===
In: Note: Flags indicate national team as defined under FIFA eligibility rules; some limited exceptions apply. Players may hold more than one non-FIFA nationality.

No.	Pos.	Nation	Player
3	DF	NOR	Fillip Voster Botnen (on loan from Viking)
4	DF	NOR	Axel Kryger (from Kristiansund)
7	FW	FRO	Olaf Bárdarson (from (Faroe Islands) Vikingur Gøta)
11	FW	NOR	Mathias Sundberg (from Strømmen)
13	GK	NOR	Tord Flolid (loan return from Sarpsborg 08)
14	FW	NOR	Peder Brekke (from Alta)
15	MF	DEN	Zifarlino Nsoni (from (Denmark) Skive)
16	MF	NOR	Yann-Erik de Lanlay (to Sandnes Ulf)
25	MF	NOR	Eliah Røksund Debes (promoted from junior squad)
26	DF	NOR	Anestis Tricholidis (promoted from junior squad)
28	DF	GHA	Jamal Deen Haruna (on loan from Sogndal)
32	MF	NOR	Nicholas Horn Ivesdal (promoted from junior squad)
77	FW	NOR	Ali Memed (from Madla)

Out: Note: Flags indicate national team as defined under FIFA eligibility rules; some limited exceptions apply. Players may hold more than one non-FIFA nationality.

No.	Pos.	Nation	Player
3	DF	NOR	Espen Hammer Berger (released)
4	DF	NOR	Eirik Asante Gayi (to Pors)
10	FW	NOR	Endre Osenbroch (to Aalesund)
11	MF	NOR	Jarmund Kvernstuen (to Skeid)
15	FW	NOR	Henrik Jensen (to Vidar)
21	MF	NOR	Teodor Håland (to Sotra)
24	DF	NOR	Mats Gresvik Lunde (to Vidar)
25	MF	NOR	Adrian Berntsen (to Grorud)
29	FW	NOR	Erik Leandersson (to Notodden)
–	FW	NOR	Bård Brandeggen (released, previously on loan at Vard)

=== Sogndal ===
In: Note: Flags indicate national team as defined under FIFA eligibility rules; some limited exceptions apply. Players may hold more than one non-FIFA nationality.

No.	Pos.	Nation	Player
4	DF	NOR	Even Hovland (from (Sweden) Brommapojkarna)
11	FW	GHA	Emmanuel Mensah (loan return from Raufoss)
15	FW	FIN	Onni Helén (from (Finland) TPS)
23	DF	ISL	Atli Barkarson (from (Belgium) Zulte Waregem)
24	GK	POL	Kacper Bieszczad (from (Portugal) Vizela)
32	DF	NOR	Mathias Øren (loan return from Åsane)
39	FW	NOR	Elias Flo (promoted from junior squad)

Out: Note: Flags indicate national team as defined under FIFA eligibility rules; some limited exceptions apply. Players may hold more than one non-FIFA nationality.

No.	Pos.	Nation	Player
13	DF	NOR	Per-Egil Flo (retired)
14	DF	GHA	Jamal Deen Haruna (on loan to Sandnes Ulf, previously on loan at Skeid)
17	DF	NOR	Martin Sjølstad (to (Denmark) Randers)
22	DF	NOR	Andreas Kalstad (to Notodden)
31	FW	NOR	Joakim Nundal (to Arendal)

=== Stabæk ===
In: Note: Flags indicate national team as defined under FIFA eligibility rules; some limited exceptions apply. Players may hold more than one non-FIFA nationality.

No.	Pos.	Nation	Player
7	MF	NOR	Oscar Solnørdal (from Brattvåg)
9	FW	NOR	Alagie Sanyang (from Sarpsborg 08)
14	DF	NOR	Eirik Lereng (from Åsane)
18	FW	NOR	Oskar Oppedal (promoted from junior squad)
19	MF	NOR	Marius Lundemo (from (Iceland) Valur)
20	MF	DEN	Oskar Boesen (on loan from (Denmark) Silkeborg)
22	GK	NOR	Marius Ulla (from Hødd)
24	FW	NOR	Jacob Hanstad (from Sandefjord)
27	DF	NOR	Mats Frimann Hansen (promoted from junior squad)
28	MF	NOR	Brage Tobiassen (loan return from Grorud)
33	FW	NOR	Axel Aamodt (promoted from junior squad)

Out: Note: Flags indicate national team as defined under FIFA eligibility rules; some limited exceptions apply. Players may hold more than one non-FIFA nationality.

No.	Pos.	Nation	Player
1	GK	NOR	Sondre Rossbach (released)
2	DF	DEN	Kasper Pedersen (released)
7	FW	NOR	Rasmus Eggen Vinge (to KFUM)
9	FW	MLI	Bassekou Diabaté (to (Belarus) ML Vitebsk)
10	MF	NOR	Herman Geelmuyden (to Åsane, previously on loan)
12	GK	NOR	Leander Gunnerød (on loan to Eik-Tønsberg)
13	DF	NOR	Martin Hellan (loan return to Brann)
14	DF	DEN	Mads Nielsen (retired)
18	MF	GHA	Abu Bawa (loan return to (Ghana) Attram de Visser)
20	DF	NOR	Aleksander Andresen (to Fredrikstad)
22	FW	NOR	Kristian Fardal Opseth (released)
24	GK	NOR	Magnus Sjøeng (loan return to Vålerenga)
26	DF	NOR	Joakim Nysveen (to Fredrikstad)
27	MF	GHA	Emmanuel Danso (to (Scotland) Livingston)
28	MF	NOR	Jesper Isaksen (to Kristiansund)
32	FW	NOR	Abel Cedergren (to (Czech Republic) Slavia Prague B)

=== Strømmen ===
In: Note: Flags indicate national team as defined under FIFA eligibility rules; some limited exceptions apply. Players may hold more than one non-FIFA nationality.

No.	Pos.	Nation	Player
1	GK	NOR	Mads Barmoen Kristiansen (free transfer)
4	DF	NOR	Maximilian Balatoni (from Lillestrøm 2, previously on loan)
5	DF	DEN	Simon Sharif (from (Denmark) Hillerød)
6	MF	NOR	Simen Beck (from Grorud)
12	GK	NOR	Knut-André Skjærstein (from Kristiansund)
15	DF	NOR	Herman Paulsrud (from Ull/Kisa)
17	DF	NOR	Deni Dashaev (on loan from Start)
20	MF	NOR	Haniel Samson (on loan from Vålerenga 2)
21	DF	NGR	Tochukwu Ogboji (on loan from Lillestrøm)
23	DF	NOR	Sverre Nilsen (loan return from Fu/Vo)
24	DF	NOR	Marcus Paulsen (from Lillestrøm 2, previously on loan)
77	MF	SWE	Ludvig Nåvik (from (Sweden) Oskarshamn)

Out: Note: Flags indicate national team as defined under FIFA eligibility rules; some limited exceptions apply. Players may hold more than one non-FIFA nationality.

No.	Pos.	Nation	Player
1	GK	BEL	Senne Vits (to (Finland) FF Jaro)
5	DF	NOR	Matias Rogstad Aadnøy (to Lørenskog)
6	MF	NOR	Nikolai Solberg (to Kvik Halden)
8	DF	NOR	Eirik Dahl Åsvestad (to Raufoss)
11	FW	NOR	Mathias Sundberg (to Sandnes Ulf)
15	MF	NOR	Dharmesh Navaratnam (to Rana)
20	FW	NOR	Martin Solli (to Eik-Tønsberg)
21	DF	NOR	Oscar Kjøge Jansson (to Bærum)
55	DF	NOR	Mohammed Hopsdal Abbas (loan return to KFUM)

=== Strømsgodset ===
In: Note: Flags indicate national team as defined under FIFA eligibility rules; some limited exceptions apply. Players may hold more than one non-FIFA nationality.

No.	Pos.	Nation	Player
1	GK	FRO	Mattias Lamhauge (from (Denmark) Fredericia)
3	DF	DEN	Victor Dedes (from (Denmark) Hillerød)
4	DF	NOR	Aleksander van der Spa (from Sandefjord)
11	FW	DEN	Sebastian Pingel (from (Denmark) Horsens)
19	MF	NOR	André Stavås Skistad (promoted from junior squad)
22	MF	NOR	Kent-Are Antonsen (from Tromsø)
24	GK	NOR	Mads Eikrem Myklebust (on loan from Molde)
27	DF	NOR	Tobias Bjørnstad (from (Germany) Phönix Lübeck)

Out: Note: Flags indicate national team as defined under FIFA eligibility rules; some limited exceptions apply. Players may hold more than one non-FIFA nationality.

No.	Pos.	Nation	Player
1	GK	NOR	Per Kristian Bråtveit (to (Scotland) Aberdeen)
4	DF	NOR	Sivert Westerlund (to Egersund)
11	MF	NOR	Jostein Ekeland (to Egersund)
17	MF	NOR	Johan Bakke (to Rosenborg)
20	FW	SLE	Alie Conteh (on loan to (Finland) Inter Turku)
21	FW	IRQ	Marko Farji (to (Italy) Venezia)
23	MF	NOR	Eirik Ulland Andersen (retired)
24	GK	NOR	Eirik Holmen (released)
24	GK	NOR	Mads Eikrem Myklebust (loan return to Molde)
27	DF	NOR	Fredrik Kristensen Dahl (to Molde)
38	GK	NOR	Jasper Silva Torkildsen (loan return to Start)
99	FW	GHA	James Ampofo (on loan to Start)

=== Åsane ===
In: Note: Flags indicate national team as defined under FIFA eligibility rules; some limited exceptions apply. Players may hold more than one non-FIFA nationality.

No.	Pos.	Nation	Player
4	DF	SEN	Hassou Ndiaye (from (Faroe Islands) NSÍ Runavík)
6	DF	NOR	Sebastian Brudvik (from Lysekloster)
7	MF	NOR	Herman Geelmuyden (from Stabæk, previously on loan)
8	MF	NOR	Jesper Eikrem (on loan from Brann)
11	FW	ITA	Leonardo Rossi (from Moss)
12	GK	NOR	Isak Reset-Kalland (from Molde 2)
14	DF	NOR	Magnus Spangelo Haga (on loan from Brann 2)
16	DF	NOR	Snorre Furnes (promoted from junior squad)
17	MF	NOR	Tobias Furebotn (promoted from B team)
24	GK	NOR	Peder Hoel Lervik (on loan from Molde)
25	MF	NOR	Malvin Ingebrigtsen (from Lyn)
44	FW	NOR	Marius Nordal (on loan from Start)
45	MF	NOR	Sverre Spangelo Haga (loan return from Lysekloster)

Out: Note: Flags indicate national team as defined under FIFA eligibility rules; some limited exceptions apply. Players may hold more than one non-FIFA nationality.

No.	Pos.	Nation	Player
3	DF	NOR	Eirik Wollen Steen (released)
4	DF	NOR	Eirik Lereng (to Stabæk)
6	DF	NOR	Ola Heltne-Nilsen (to Hønefoss)
8	MF	NOR	Emil Sildnes (to Raufoss)
9	FW	NOR	Erling Myklebust (to (Canada) Atletico Ottawa)
12	GK	NOR	Oliver Madsen (to Ranheim, previously on loan at (Sweden) Stocksund)
16	MF	NOR	Lucas Kolstad (loan return to Ranheim)
17	FW	SWE	Nobel Gebrezgi (to (Sweden) Åtvidaberg)
21	MF	NGR	Efe Lucky (loan return to Lillestrøm)
23	DF	NOR	Mathias Øren (loan return to Sogndal)
25	DF	NOR	Emmanuel Tchotcho Bangoura (to Fyllingsdalen, previously on loan at Sandviken)
27	MF	NOR	Thomas Roger Lotsberg (to Sandviken, previously on loan)
99	GK	NOR	Magnus Rugland Ree (loan return to Viking)
