= Norway national under-19 football team =

National under-19 association football team representing Norway

Norway under-19
- Nickname: U19-landslaget
- Association: Football Association of Norway (Norges Fotballforbund)
- Head coach: Pål Arne Johansen
- Most caps: Lars Hjorth (21)
- Top scorer: Sven Otto Birkeland (12)
First colours	Second colours

Biggest win
- Norway 10–0 Gibraltar (Riga, Latvia; 11 October 2023)

Biggest defeat
- Norway 1–6 Netherlands (Ahlen, Germany; 21 March 2018)

U-19 European Championship
- Appearances: 7 (first in 2002)
- Best result: Semi-finals (2023)

The Norway national under-19 football team, controlled by the Football Association of Norway, is the national football team of Norway for players of 19 years of age or under at the start of a UEFA European Under-19 Football Championship campaign.

== Competitive record ==
=== UEFA European Under-19 Football Championship record ===
Year	Round	Pld	W	D*	L	GF	GA
(Norway) 2002	Group stage	3	0	0	3	1	9
(Liechtenstein) 2003	Group stage	3	1	1	1	4	4
(Switzerland) 2004	did not qualify						
(Northern Ireland) 2005	Group stage	3	1	0	2	5	6
(Poland) 2006	did not qualify						
(Austria) 2007	did not qualify						
(Czech Republic) 2008	did not qualify						
(Ukraine) 2009	did not qualify						
(France) 2010	did not qualify						
(Romania) 2011	did not qualify						
(Estonia) 2012	did not qualify						
(Lithuania) 2013	did not qualify						
(Hungary) 2014	did not qualify						
(Greece) 2015	did not qualify						
(Germany) 2016	did not qualify						
(Georgia (country)) 2017	did not qualify						
(Finland) 2018	Group stage	4	2	0	2	8	6
(Armenia) 2019	Group stage	3	0	2	1	1	2
(Northern Ireland) ~~2020~~	Cancelled						
(Romania) ~~2021~~	Cancelled						
(Slovakia) 2022	did not qualify						
(Malta) 2023	Semi-finals	4	1	2	1	6	10
(Northern Ireland) 2024	Group stage	3	1	1	1	3	2
(Romania) 2025	did not qualify						
(Wales) 2026	did not qualify						
(Czech Republic) 2027	TBD						
(Bulgaria) 2028	TBD						
(Netherlands) 2029	TBD						
Total	7/21	23	6	6	11	28	39

== Players ==
=== Current squad ===
The following players were called up for simultaneous 2026 UEFA European Under-19 Championship qualification elite round and 2027 UEFA European Under-19 Championship qualification first-round fixtures between 25-31 March 2026.

- 2026 UEFA European Under-19 Championship qualification opponents: France, Croatia, Switzerland
- 2027 UEFA European Under-19 Championship qualification opponents: Malta, Luxembourg, Albania.

No.	Pos.	Player	Date of birth (age)	Club
	GK	Einar Bøe Fauskanger	18 July 2008 (age 18)	(Norwegian Football Federation) Haugesund
	GK	Mathias Engevik Klausen	10 October 2007 (age 19)	(Norwegian Football Federation) Sandviken
	GK	Bernard Eide	24 August 2008 (age 18)	(Swedish Football Association) Lidingö
	GK	Alexander Ordal	31 March 2008 (age 18)	(Norwegian Football Federation) Vålerenga
	DF	Mats Sekse Johannesen	18 June 2008 (age 18)	(Norwegian Football Federation) Viking
	DF	Håkon Volden	25 May 2007 (age 19)	(Norwegian Football Federation) Rosenborg
	DF	Jonathan Norbye	26 March 2007 (age 19)	(Norwegian Football Federation) Fredrikstad
	DF	Lucas Svenningsen	15 January 2007 (age 19)	(Norwegian Football Federation) Tromsdalen
	DF	Joachim Prent-Eckbo	5 March 2007 (age 19)	(Norwegian Football Federation) KFUM Oslo
	DF	Isac Tostrup-Kval	13 February 2008 (age 18)	(Norwegian Football Federation) Strømsgodset
	DF	Henrik Haraldsen	11 August 2008 (age 18)	(Danish Football Association) Copenhagen
	DF	Mats Frimann Hansen	14 February 2008 (age 18)	(Norwegian Football Federation) Stabæk
	DF	Daniel Risan Nakken	26 May 2008 (age 18)	(Norwegian Football Federation) Molde
	DF	Fillip Riise	11 May 2007 (age 19)	(Norwegian Football Federation) Stabæk
	DF	Haakon Haugen	10 January 2007 (age 19)	(Norwegian Football Federation) Kristiansund
	DF	Jesper Johnsson Solberg	6 February 2008 (age 18)	(Norwegian Football Federation) Mjøndalen
	MF	Johan Solstad-Nøis	30 January 2008 (age 18)	(Norwegian Football Federation) Tromsø
	MF	Isak Holmen	9 June 2007 (age 19)	(Norwegian Football Federation) Levanger
	MF	Tobias Leikanger	19 January 2008 (age 18)	(Norwegian Football Federation) Aalesund
	MF	Lukas Hjelleset Gausdal	20 April 2007 (age 19)	(Norwegian Football Federation) Start
	MF	Martin Åmot Lye	8 February 2008 (age 18)	(Norwegian Football Federation) Bryne
	MF	Elias Johnsson Solberg	6 February 2008 (age 18)	(Norwegian Football Federation) Ranheim
	MF	Philip Holseter-Karlsen	6 March 2008 (age 18)	(Royal Dutch Football Association) PSV
	MF	Elias Sandrød	18 March 2007 (age 19)	(Norwegian Football Federation) Stjørdals-Blink
	MF	Sebastian Olderheim	8 July 2007 (age 19)	(Norwegian Football Federation) Stabæk
	MF	Harald Woxen	1 February 2008 (age 18)	(Norwegian Football Federation) Lillestrøm
	MF	Jesper Eikrem	2 July 2007 (age 19)	(Norwegian Football Federation) Brann
	MF	Elias Flo	23 June 2008 (age 18)	(Norwegian Football Federation) Sogndal
	FW	Julian Lægreid	8 March 2007 (age 19)	(Norwegian Football Federation) Moss
	FW	Daniel Skaarud	17 September 2007 (age 19)	(Royal Dutch Football Association) Ajax
	FW	Oskar Dæhli Oppedal	5 February 2008 (age 18)	(Norwegian Football Federation) Stabæk
	FW	Hindrin Najah Chooly	18 June 2008 (age 18)	(Norwegian Football Federation) Bodø/Glimt
	FW	Kristian Skurve Håland	15 April 2007 (age 19)	(Norwegian Football Federation) Bryne
	FW	David de Ornelas	25 June 2008 (age 18)	(Norwegian Football Federation) HamKam
	FW	Liam West	16 December 2007 (age 18)	(Danish Football Association) Copenhagen
	FW	Igor Gosik	7 February 2008 (age 18)	(Norwegian Football Federation) Molde
	FW	Sean Nilsen-Modebe	21 July 2007 (age 19)	(Norwegian Football Federation) Hødd
	FW	Markus Wæhler	19 September 2007 (age 19)	(Norwegian Football Federation) Lillestrøm
	FW	Sean Healy Andresen	23 October 2008 (age 18)	(Norwegian Football Federation) Strømsgodset
	FW	Emilien Hagesæter Steinsland	22 February 2008 (age 18)	(Norwegian Football Federation) Brann
