= Jasper Silva Torkildsen =

Norwegian footballer (born 2003)

Personal information
- Date of birth: 21 December 2003 (age 22)
- Place of birth: Kristiansand, Norway
- Height: 1.95 m (6 ft 5 in)
- Position: Goalkeeper

Team information
- Current team: Fredrikstad
- Number: 30

Youth career
- –2020: Vigør

Senior career*
Years	Team	Apps	(Gls)
2019	Vigør	4	(0)
2021–2026	Start	61	(0)
2025	→ Haugesund (loan)	3	(0)
2025	→ Strømsgodset (loan)	2	(0)
2026–	Fredrikstad	0	(0)

International career
2019	Norway U16	2	(0)
2020	Norway U17	2	(0)
2021	Norway U18	1	(0)
2022	Norway U19	1	(0)
2022–2023	Norway U20	3	(0)
- * Club domestic league appearances and goals as of 2 September 2026

Jasper Silva Torkildsen (born 21 December 2003) is a Norwegian footballer who plays as a goalkeeper for Fredrikstad.

== Career ==
Torkildsen started playing football for FK Vigør, where he was coached by Erik Ruthford Pedersen. He made his senior debut for Vigør in the 2019 Norwegian Fourth Division before signing for the main team in the city, IK Start, in December 2020. For the 2022 season, Torkildsen was selected by manager Sindre Tjelmeland as Start's first-choice goalkeeper, still only aged 18.

In the first phase of the 2024 First Division, in April 2024, Torkildsen was stretchered off after being hit in the head by an opponent's knee. He required surgery to his face. Returning to play, he needed a face-covering mask.

Start lost confidence in Torkildsen as a first-choice goalkeeper in 2025, signed Jacob Pryts and loaned Torkildsen out to FK Haugesund. An injury in the pre-season meant that Torkildsen did not play for Haugesund at all, described as an "absurd" situation.

In August, Haugesund refused to end the loan, as Fredrikstad FK requested that Torkildsen them and played the 2025–26 UEFA Conference League play-off match against Crystal Palace. Only days later, Haugesund ended the loan anyway. He ended up on another loan to Strømsgodset.

At the end of 2025, Torkildsen found himself in the peculiar situation that both Haugesund and Strømsgodset were relegated to the First Division, whereas Start were promoted. Torkildsen returned to Start and vowed to become a regular starter again. Torkildsen played a friendly match for Start during Eliteserien's World Cup break. In August 2026 he was again approached by Fredrikstad, with reports about agreeing to a future transfer, from 1 January 2027.

== Personal life ==
He is a devout believer. Guitar playing is among his hobbies.
