= Mame Alassane Niang =

Senegalese footballer (born 1997)

Personal information
- Date of birth: 28 January 1997 (age 29)
- Place of birth: Ndatte, Senegal
- Height: 1.94 m (6 ft 4 in)
- Position: Striker

Team information
- Current team: Porto
- Number: 46

Youth career
- 2014–2024: Diambars

Senior career*
Years	Team	Apps	(Gls)
2024–2026	Lyn	31	(3)
2026–	→ HamKam (loan)	6	(4)
2026	HamKam	5	(3)
2026–	Porto	0	(0)
- * Club domestic league appearances and goals as of 22 July 2026

Mame Alassane Niang (born 28 January 1997) is a Senegalese footballer who plays as a striker for Porto.

Born in Ndatte, he joined the academy Diambars FC at the age of 12. He earned his first professional contract aged 18, when he was signed by Norwegian second-tier club Lyn. His first Lyn goals came for the B team, helping secure promotion from the 2024 Fourth Division. His first 1. divisjon goal came in March 2025.

On the last day of the 2026 winter transfer window, Hamarkameratene signed Niang on a loan with an option to buy. He soon stood out as a breakthrough player of the 2026 Eliteserien, scoring 4 goals in his first 4 games.
