= David de Ornelas =

Norwegian footballer (born 2008)

Personal information
- Full name: David de Ornelas de Conno
- Date of birth: 25 June 2008 (age 18)
- Place of birth: Skien, Norway
- Height: 1.80 m (5 ft 11 in)
- Position: Right winger

Team information
- Current team: HamKam
- Number: 25

Youth career
- –2023: Storm
- 2023–2024: Odd

Senior career*
Years	Team	Apps	(Gls)
2024	Odd 2	5	(0)
2025–	HamKam 2	18	(1)
2025–	HamKam	2	(0)

International career^{‡}
2024	Venezuela U15	3	(0)
2024	Norway U16	4	(0)
2025	Norway U17	7	(1)
2026–	Norway U19	2	(0)
- * Club domestic league appearances and goals as of 25 February 2025 ‡ National team caps and goals as of 9 March 2026

David de Ornelas de Conno (born 25 June 2008) is a Norwegian footballer who plays as a forward for right winger for HamKam.

== Club career ==
De Ornelas began his football training at Storm in Skien. During his time in the U15 and U16 categories, he stood out as a winger and full-back, scoring 39 goals in 71 matches and winning the regional championship twice in a row.

In January 2025, he joined Hamarkameratene, mostly playing for the B team in the Norwegian Fourth Division. De Ornelas plays mainly as a right winger, although he has also played as a left-back and left winger. His versatility and performance have earned him call-ups to the Norway national U17 team.

== International career ==
Ornelas has played for the youth teams of both Norway and Venezuela. In 2024, he played four matches for Norway U16 and three for Venezuela U15. The following year, he played three matches for Norway U17 during the qualifying phase for the 2025 UEFA European Under-17 Championship.

Norway failed to qualify after suffering three consecutive defeats. His first match was on 19 March 2025 against Spain U17, which ended in a 2–1 defeat.

Thanks to his dual nationality, Ornelas is eligible to represent both countries at an international level. In November 2024, coach Oswaldo Vizcarrondo called him up to join Venezuela U17 team for the 2025 South American U-17 Championship.

== Personal life ==
He is a son of former Venezuelan footballer Fernando de Ornelas, who is known for playing for Crystal Palace and Celtic.

Conno's younger brother, Fernando, is also a Cyprus-born footballer; he plays as a midfielder.

== Career statistics ==
=== Club ===
As of match played 25 February 2025.

Club	Season	League			National cup		Europe		Total	
Club	Season	Division	Apps	Goals	Apps	Goals	Apps	Goals	Apps	Goals
Odd 2	2024	Norwegian Third Division	5	0	—		—		5	0
HamKam 2	2025	Norwegian Fourth Division	18	1	—		—		18	1
HamKam	2025	Eliteserien	1	0	1	0	—		2	0
HamKam	Total		24	1	1	0	—		25	1
Career total			24	1	1	0	—		25	1
