= Jacob Pryts =

Danish footballer (born 1998)

Personal information
- Full name: Jacob Pryts Larsen
- Date of birth: 25 June 1998 (age 28)
- Place of birth: Denmark
- Height: 1.91 m (6 ft 3 in)
- Position: Goalkeeper

Team information
- Current team: Sarpsborg 08
- Number: 1

Youth career
- SB 50 Ishøj
- Brøndby

Senior career*
Years	Team	Apps	(Gls)
2015–2017	Brøndby	0	(0)
2017	→ Næstved (loan)	2	(0)
2018–2020	Næstved	45	(0)
2020–2023	Fremad Amager	77	(0)
2023–2024	Silkeborg	2	(0)
2024–	Start	56	(0)
2026–	→ Sarpsborg 08 (loan)	1	(0)

International career
2014	Denmark U-17	2	(0)
2016	Denmark U-18	1	(0)
2016–2017	Denmark U-19	6	(0)
2017–2018	Denmark U-20	2	(0)
2018	Denmark U-21	1	(0)
- * Club domestic league appearances and goals as of 8 November 2026

Jacob Pryts Larsen (born 25 June 1998) is a Danish professional footballer who plays as a goalkeeper for Norwegian Eliteserien club Sarpsborg 08, on loan from Start.

== Career ==
At the age of two, Pryts started playing football at Strandens Boldklub 1950, SB50, in Ishøj. At the time, Pryts was playing striker. After that, Pryts, along with several teammates from SB50, switched to Brøndby IF. He was later retrained as a goalkeeper at Brøndby.

Pryts worked his way up through the club's academy and in both the 2015–16 and 2016–17 seasons was on the bench several times for the first team. In January 2017, Pryts became a regular part of the Brøndby first team squad and signed a new contract until June 2018.

At the end of January 2017, Pryts was loaned out to Næstved Boldklub until the end of the season. After the end of the season, Pryts returned to Brøndby, where he was at the club for the first half of the season. At the end of 2017, Pryts moved permanently to Næstved.

After two and a half seasons in Næstved, Fremad Amager confirmed on 3 September 2020, that they had signed Pryts on a three-year contract. In February 2023, Pryts extended his contract until the end of 2025. However, just five months after the extension, Pryts left the club when he was bought by Danish Superliga club Silkeborg IF at the end of June 2023, where Prtys was given a contract until the end of 2025.

On 23 August 2024, Pryts joined Norwegian First Division club Start on a contract until the end of 2026. After the switch, Pryts said he was disappointed with the lack of chances at Silkeborg, as he only got to play four games.
