= Noah Alexandersson =

Swedish footballer

Personal information
- Full name: Noah Jonathan Alexandersson
- Date of birth: 30 September 2001 (age 25)
- Place of birth: Warrington, England
- Height: 1.79 m (5 ft 10 in)
- Position: Midfielder

Team information
- Current team: Moss
- Number: 7

Youth career
- –2016: Västra Frölunda IF
- 2018–2019: IFK Göteborg

Senior career*
Years	Team	Apps	(Gls)
2016–2017	Västra Frölunda IF	17	(4)
2019–2021	IFK Göteborg	12	(0)
2021	→ Moss FK (loan)	13	(4)
2022–2026	Moss FK	73	(16)
2026–	HamKam	0	(0)
2026–	→ Moss FK (loan)	9	(0)

International career^{‡}
2016–2018	Sweden U17	11	(0)
2018–2019	Sweden U19	6	(0)
- * Club domestic league appearances and goals as of 14 November 2026 ‡ National team caps and goals as of 18:32, 29 July 2021 (UTC)

Noah Alexandersson (born 30 September 2001) is a Swedish professional footballer who plays as a midfielder for Moss, on loan from HamKam.

== Career ==
After four years with Moss FK, Alexandersson signed for Eliteserien side HamKam in January 2026.

== Personal life ==
Alexandersson is the son of Niclas Alexandersson and was born in England during his father's time playing for Everton.
