= August Ljungberg =

Swedish footballer (born 2005)

Personal information
- Full name: August Johan Ljungberg
- Date of birth: 13 May 2005 (age 21)
- Place of birth: Uppsala, Sweden
- Height: 1.80 m (5 ft 11 in)
- Position: Left winger

Team information
- Current team: IFK Värnamo on loan from IK Sirius

Youth career
- Danmarks IF
- 2017–2023: IK Sirius

Senior career*
| Years | Team | Apps | (Gls) |
| 2023– | IK Sirius | 42 | (1) |
| 2026 | → Egersunds IK (loan) | 0 | (0) |
| 2026– | → IFK Värnamo (loan) | | |

International career^{‡}
| 2024 | Sweden U19 | 2 | (0) |
| 2024 | Sweden U21 | 1 | (0) |
- * Club domestic league appearances and goals as of 4 September 2026 ‡ National team caps and goals as of 29 August 2026

August Ljungberg (born 13 May 2005) is a Swedish footballer who plays as a winger for IFK Värnamo on loan from IK Sirius.

== Career ==
Ljungberg started playing for Danmarks IF as a child, until joining IK Sirius at the age of twelve. He was given a contract and joined the senior debut in May 2023. By that time he had already made his debut in the 2022–23 Svenska Cupen and the 2023 Allsvenskan. He made his international debut for Sweden U20 in September 2024, in a double fixture against Denmark U20. In November 2024 he was called up to Sweden U21 as well.

During half-time and post-match interviews in 2025, Ljungberg raised some eyebrows for criticizing himself. He thought he had too few goals and assists. He did score in the 2025–26 Svenska Cupen.

Norwegian second-tier club Egersunds IK managed to sign Ljungberg in February 2026 on a loan lasting throughout 2026. He was however recalled in June 2026, having only played once, in the 2025–26 Cup fourth round. Initially injured, in July 2026 he scored his first Allsvenskan goal, for a Sirius team that led the Allsvenskan table by a large margin. At the end of the summer transfer window, he was sent on a new loan, this time to Superettan team IFK Värnamo.
