= Hamarkameratene =

Norwegian football club

- Full name: Hamarkameratene
- Nicknames: Kamma, Grønnbuksene
- Founded: 10 August 1918; 108 years ago
- Ground: Briskeby Arena, Hamar
- Capacity: 7,600
- Chairman: Truls Nordby Johansen
- Head coach: Thomas Myhre
- League: Eliteserien
- 2025: Eliteserien, 11th of 16
- Website: www.hamkam.no
Home colours	Away colours

Hamarkameratene (lit. 'the Hamar Comrades'), often abbreviated to HamKam or Ham-Kam, is a Norwegian professional football club based in the town of Hamar. The club was founded in 1918, originally under the name Freidig.

HamKam were most recently promoted to the Eliteserien in 2021. A third-place finish in 1970 is the highest position that the team has held in the top division; the club has never progressed beyond the semifinals of the Norwegian Cup, last reaching the semifinals in 1989.

Briskeby Stadion has been the home ground of Hamarkameratene since 1936. The construction of a completely modernized stadium began in 2007 but has never been completed. Originally scheduled to be completed in 2009, the expanded Briskeby is expected to have a capacity of 10,200 spectators on completion, but currently has a capacity of approximately 8,100.

== History ==
Hamarkameratene were founded as Freidig on 10 August 1918 by a group of teenagers. The prerequisite for joining the team was being able to pay for the football. Freidig applied for entry into the regional series in 1926, but were only admitted after their second attempt, in 1927. At the time a club by the name of "Freidig" was already playing in the series, so the boys from Hamar were forced to rename their team. The natural choice was Briskebyen Fotballag (Briskebyen Football Team), Briskeby being the name of their neighbourhood. The club had no permanent playing location until 1936, instead renting fields from various other clubs. Eventually this situation grew intolerable and ground for a stadium of their own was bought in 1934. Briskeby gressbane was inaugurated two years later and has remained the club's home ground ever since. The neighborhood was located in Vang Municipality until an expansion of Hamar's city limits in 1946 when it became part of Hamar Municipality.

In 1946, Briskebyen Fotballag joined up with the multimodal sports club Hamar Arbeideridrettslag (Hamar Workers' Sports Club) to form Hamarkameratene (literally meaning "Comrades of Hamar"). Because of the general reconciliation between bourgeois and workers' sports clubs, it was the wish of the municipality that all the sports clubs in Hamar merge, but in the end only these two clubs, who both considered themselves as working-class clubs and were from the same area, were able to reach an agreement. The first manager was Roy Wright, a former Wolverhampton player. His experience from English football, however, did not benefit the club and he was considered a disappointment. The Czech Vilém Červený, on the other hand, proved to be an influential asset to club and the development of a football culture in the region.

The first half of the 1970s was the club's most successful period to date. Having won promotion to the 1. divisjon for the first time in 1969 (the highest level in Norway at the time), the green and white placed third overall in their first season, as well as reaching the semifinals of the Norwegian Cup. HamKam remained a stable contender in the 1. divisjon until 1974, when they were relegated. The club would earn promotion to the highest division three more times before 1980.

The '80s continued in much the same fashion as the latter part of the '70s, with the club going back and forth between the two top levels in Norwegian football. In 1984, a new stand with a capacity of 2,346 was constructed at Briskeby. A considerable loan was taken up to fund the stand, of which the club would feel the effects for the decade to come, among other things because of the rise in interest rates after the 1987 stock market correction. A measure of success was still achieved, however, with the club reaching the semifinals of the cup in 1987 and 1989.

A successful season in 1991 saw Hamarkameratene once again win promotion to the highest division, under Swedish coach Peter Engelbrektsson. The club managed to avoid relegation in 1992 by virtue of a better goal difference, and entered into 1993 with renewed confidence. After a slow start, the team began climbing towards the top, and were in reach of second place and even the championship towards the end of the season, but with a slump in form a fifth place was the still-positive result.

HamKam spent another two years in the top flight before entering a recession. In 1994, the municipality bought the stadium to remove the debt which had nearly bankrupted the club. Coach Engelbrektsson left after relegation to the 1. divisjon in 1995, and the club failed to earn promotion in 1996 and 1997. Serious financial problems emerged at the beginning of 1998. This time a group of private investors prevented bankruptcy, but HamKam were unable to even retain their spot in the 1. divisjon and were relegated to the 2. divisjon. Promotion back into the 1. divisjon was won the following season, and a slow process followed to rebuild the team. In 2001 the club nearly made it back to the first tier but lost the playoff against Bryne. The following season was a disappointment, with only eighth place to show for, and the club was yet again experiencing financial problems.

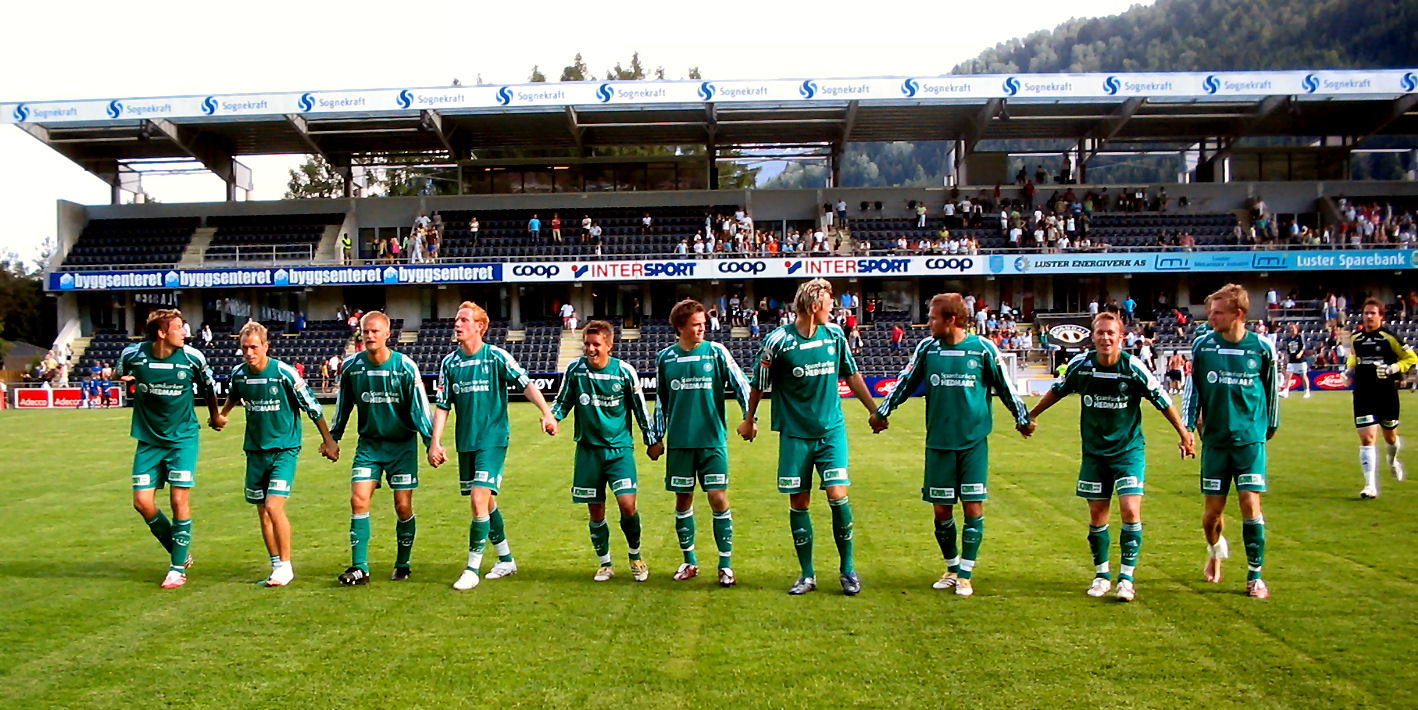
HamKam players celebrating after the victory over Sogndal at Fosshaugane Campus 9 June 2007. From left: Markus Ringberg, Vegar Bjerke, Juha Pasoja, Espen Olsen, Truls Jevne Hagen, John Anders Rise, Roman Kienast, Thomas Øverby, Marius Gullerud, Jan Michaelsen og Svein Inge Haagenrud.

After struggling for seven years, the hiring of Ståle Solbakken as the team's coach before the start of the 2003 season marked the beginning of another short stay at the top of Norwegian football for the green and white. Having won the 1. divisjon in 2003, they entered the top division for the first time since 1995. The first season in the top flight in eight years was a formidable success. Under Solbakken's leadership, HamKam were in contention for a spot among the final four and a place in the UEFA Cup qualifying rounds. They would eventually end the season in fifth place. Thought by many to be unable to cope in the company of wealthier clubs, this was an impressive feat by the team with the second-smallest budget of them all.

Expectations were high in 2005, but despite early prospects of a good season (in their first game, they defeated would-be champions Vålerenga), HamKam were unable to perform consistently and ended up in a disappointing tenth place. Soon after, Solbakken announced that he would be leaving the club to become manager of FC Copenhagen. He was succeeded by the former Norwegian national goalkeeper Frode Grodås.

Solbakken's tenure at Hamarkameratene had left the club in a much improved state from prior to his arrival. Gone were the financial problems that had plagued the club for two decades. People were once again coming to see the team play, with attendances now averaging more than 5,500, a number not seen since the '70s. Fans of the club had even gone as far as to nickname their manager Ståle "Salvatore" ("the saviour") in recognition of his achievements.

His successor failed to capitalize. HamKam picked up where they left off in 2005, scoring some spectacular wins against top teams while again being unable to perform consistently. As the season neared its end, however, Frode Grodås failed where Solbakken had succeeded, namely in keeping HamKam away from the relegation zone. Going into the final round of the season, they found themselves third from the bottom of the table and in need of a win. HamKam instead suffered a humiliating 1–5 loss at home, dropping to 13th place and relegation in 2006.

As a result, the board decided to fire Grodås from his position as head coach, and on 13 November Arne Erlandsen was hired as his replacement. Vegard Skogheim, a long-time favourite amongst the fans, was hired as assistant coach. HamKam returned to the top division in 2007 but relegated again to 1. divisjon as 14th or last in 2008. HamKam slipped down to 2. divisjon as 13th after losing 1–0 away match against Sparta Sarpsborg in 2009.

In the 2010 season, HamKam won its section of the Second Division and won promotion back to the second tier. However, economic problems came to a head, and on 21 December 2010, the board announced that the club had decided to file for bankruptcy on 30 December, unless fresh funds were raised by that time.

In the 2021 season, HamKam were promoted from the First Division as champions, returning to the Eliteserien for the first time since 2008.

== Stadium ==
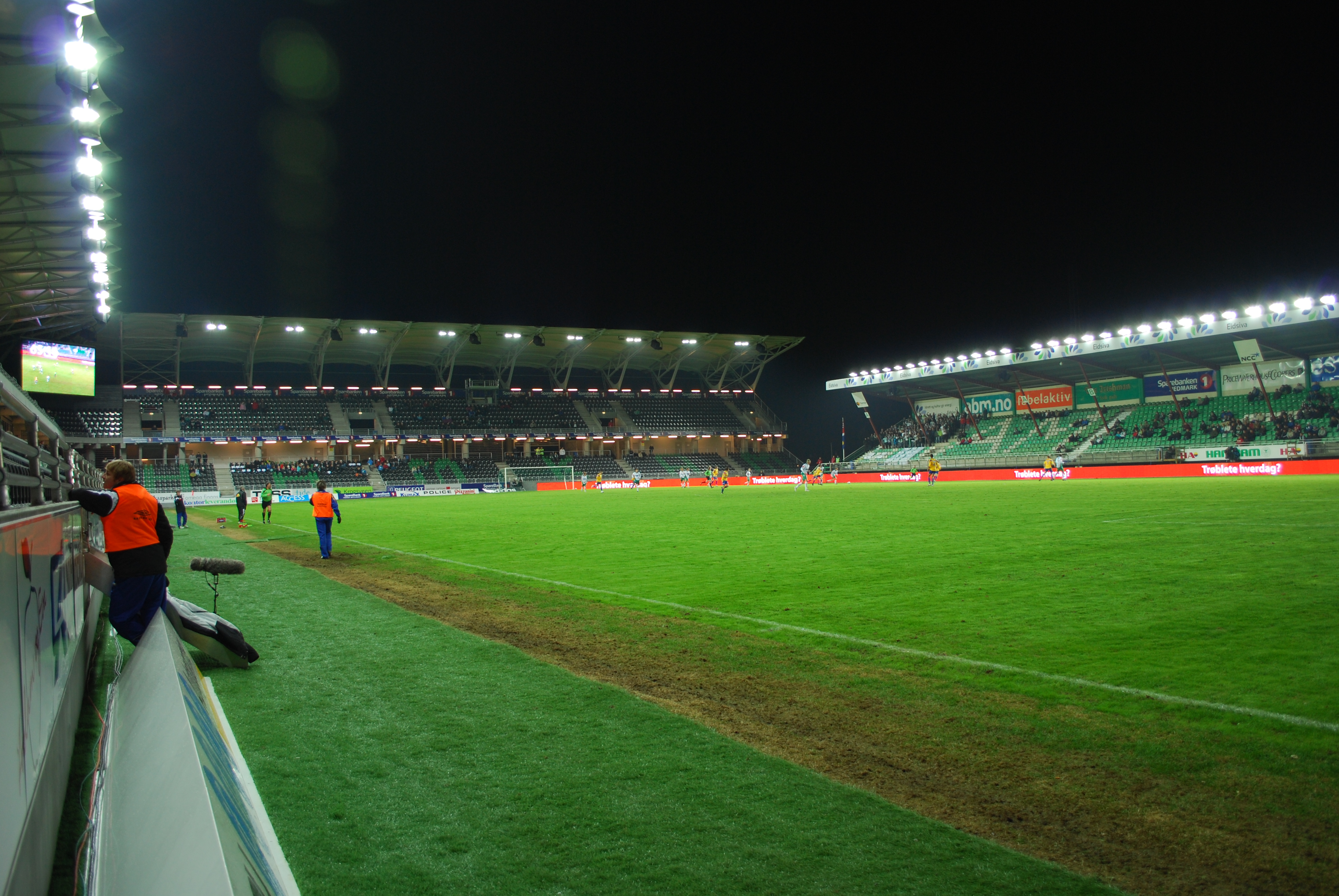
The newly renovated Briskeby Stadion stand to the left and ahead

HamKam play their home games as Briskeby Stadion, an all-seater football stadium located at Briskebyen in Hamar. The venue is owned by Hamar Municipality. The new section of Briskeby has the same style and building materials as the two other main sports venues in Hamar, Vikingskipet and Hamar Olympic Amphitheatre, which were built for the 1994 Winter Olympics. The venue has capacity for 8,068 spectators and has club seating 600 people. The pitch is 105 by 68 meters (344 by 223 ft) artificial turf. Around the pitch are 180 digital advertising board. There are two 40-square-meter (430 sq ft) scoreboard screens. The stands have 13 concession stands, all which are built to allow a view of the pitch while standing in a queue.

== Honours ==
- Norwegian top division
  - Third place: 1970
- 1. divisjon
  - Champions (2): 2003, 2021
- Norwegian Cup
  - Semi-finals (6): 1969, 1970, 1971, 1973, 1987, 1989

== Recent history ==
Season		Pos.	Pl.	W	D	L	GS	GA	P	Cup	Notes
2003	1. divisjon	↑ 1	30	19	6	5	60	29	63	3rd round	Promoted to Tippeligaen
2004	Tippeligaen	5	26	10	8	8	34	33	38	Quarterfinal	
2005	Tippeligaen	10	26	8	7	11	31	37	31	Quarterfinal	
2006	Tippeligaen	↓ 13	26	7	7	12	35	39	28	Last 16	Relegated to 1. divisjon
2007	1. divisjon	↑ 2	30	21	5	4	82	36	68	Second round	Promoted to Tippeligaen
2008	Tippeligaen	↓ 14	26	5	6	15	22	50	21	Second round	Relegated to 1. divisjon
2009	1. divisjon	↓ 13	30	11	4	15	56	48	37	Third round	Relegated to 2. Divisjon
2010	2. divisjon	↑ 1	26	19	2	5	75	25	59	Second round	Promoted to Adeccoligaen
2011	1. divisjon	6	30	14	9	7	52	40	51	Second round	
2012	1. divisjon	8	30	13	6	11	51	49	43	Third round	
2013	1. divisjon	5	30	14	6	10	49	43	48	Fourth round	
2014	1. divisjon	↓ 16	30	1	4	25	22	78	7	Third round	Relegated to 2. divisjon
2015	2. divisjon	4	26	10	10	6	51	44	40	Second round	
2016	2. divisjon	2	26	16	8	2	63	27	56	First round	
2017	2. divisjon	↑ 1	26	21	2	3	56	18	65	First round	Promoted to the 1. divisjon
2018	1. divisjon	9	30	12	6	12	46	44	42	Fourth Round	
2019	1. divisjon	10	30	11	5	14	43	47	38	Second Round	
2020	1. divisjon	9	30	10	9	11	49	52	39	Cancelled	
2021	1. divisjon	↑ 1	30	21	6	3	62	21	69	Third round	Promoted to the Eliteserien
2022	Eliteserien	13	30	6	13	11	33	43	31	Third round	
2023	Eliteserien	11	30	10	4	16	39	59	34	Quarter Final	
2024	Eliteserien	12	30	8	9	13	34	39	33	Fourth round	
2025	Eliteserien	11	30	10	7	13	42	47	41	Fourth round	
2026 (in progress)	Eliteserien	13	25	7	6	12	35	53	27	Fourth round	

== Current squad ==
As of 7 September 2026

Note: Flags indicate national team as defined under FIFA eligibility rules; some limited exceptions apply. Players may hold more than one non-FIFA nationality.

No.	Pos.	Nation	Player
2	DF	NOR	Martin Gjone
3	DF	NOR	Ethan Amundsen-Day
4	DF	NOR	Halvor Rødølen Opsahl
5	DF	NOR	Aleksander Andresen
6	MF	NOR	William Osnes-Ringen
7	MF	ISL	Viðar Ari Jónsson
8	MF	NOR	Markus Johnsgård
10	MF	SUI	Loris Mettler
11	MF	NOR	Mohamed Ofkir
12	GK	SWE	Marcus Sandberg
13	GK	NOR	Sander Østraat
14	DF	NED	Luc Mares
16	MF	NOR	Anders Trondsen
17	MF	NOR	Aksel Potur

No.	Pos.	Nation	Player
18	FW	POR	Duarte Moreira
19	FW	NOR	Henrik Udahl
22	DF	NOR	Snorre Strand Nilsen
23	MF	NOR	Fredrik Sjølstad (captain)
24	FW	IRQ	Danilo Al-Saed (on loan from Häcken)
25	DF	NOR	David de Ornelas
26	MF	CAN	Patrick Metcalfe
27	DF	POR	João Barros
28	FW	NGR	David Benjamin
29	MF	KOS	Blerton Isufi (on loan from Molde)
33	GK	NOR	Simon Rusen
—	FW	NOR	Olav Mengshoel
—	FW	SEN	Mamadou Diop (on loan from Diambars)

For season transfers, see transfers winter 2025–26 and transfers summer 2026.

=== Out on loan ===
Note: Flags indicate national team as defined under FIFA eligibility rules; some limited exceptions apply. Players may hold more than one non-FIFA nationality.

No.	Pos.	Nation	Player
11	MF	NOR	Eron Gojani (at Sundsvall until 31 December 2026)
21	MF	SWE	Noah Alexandersson (at Moss until 31 December 2026)

No.	Pos.	Nation	Player
26	MF	NOR	Mats Pedersen (at Jaro until 31 December 2026)
34	DF	NOR	Mads Orrhaug Larsen (at Raufoss until 31 December 2026)
