= Saadiq Elmi =

Somali footballer (born 2000)

Personal information
- Full name: Saadiq Faisal Elmi
- Date of birth: 11 November 2000 (age 26)
- Position: Defender

Team information
- Current team: Kongsvinger
- Number: 25

Youth career
- Grorud

Senior career*
Years	Team	Apps	(Gls)
2017–2023	Grorud	77	(4)
2020	→ Moss (loan)	13	(0)
2024–2025	Moss	25	(0)
2026	Raufoss	5	(0)
2026–	Kongsvinger	8	(0)

International career^{‡}
2024	Somalia	4	(0)
- * Club domestic league appearances and goals as of 14 November 2026 ‡ National team caps and goals as of 1 December 2023

Saadiq Faisal Elmi (born 11 November 2000) is a Somali footballer who plays as a midfielder for Kongsvinger and the Somalia national team.

== Club career ==
Elmi began his career with Norwegian club Grorud, making his debut in the 2017 2. divisjon season. In 2020, Elmi was loaned to fellow 2. divisjon club Moss. In January 2024, Elmi signed a two-year contract with Moss FK. This is a club Elmi is familiar with since he spent the 2020 season on loan at Melløs.

== International career ==
On 15 June 2021, Elmi made his debut for Somalia, in a 1–0 friendly loss against Djibouti.
