= 2021 Vålerenga Fotball season =

Vålerenga
2021 season
- Chairman: Thomas Baardseng
- Head coach: Dag-Eilev Fagermo
- Stadium: Intility Arena
- Eliteserien: 7th
- Norwegian Cup: Third round
- Europa Conference League: Second qualifying round
- Top goalscorer: League: Henrik Udahl; Aron Dønnum (6 each); All: Henrik Udahl (7)
Home colours	Away colours	Third colours

The 2021 season was Vålerenga Fotball's 108th season in existence and the club's 20th consecutive season in the top flight of Norwegian football. In addition to the domestic league, Vålerenga Fotball participated in this season's edition of the Norwegian Football Cup and the UEFA Europa Conference League.

== Players ==
=== First-team squad ===
As of 27 July 2021

Note: Flags indicate national team as defined under FIFA eligibility rules; some limited exceptions apply. Players may hold more than one non-FIFA nationality.

No.	Pos.	Nation	Player
1	GK	NOR	Kjetil Haug
2	DF	NOR	Christian Borchgrevink
3	DF	NOR	Brage Skaret
4	DF	NOR	Jonatan Tollås (Captain)
5	DF	MKD	Leonard Zuta
6	MF	DEN	Nicolaj Thomsen
7	MF	NOR	Fredrik Oldrup Jensen
8	MF	NOR	Henrik Bjørdal
9	FW	ISL	Viðar Örn Kjartansson
10	MF	SWE	Albin Mörfelt
11	FW	TUN	Amor Layouni
14	FW	NOR	Henrik Udahl

No.	Pos.	Nation	Player
15	FW	NOR	Odin Thiago Holm
16	MF	NOR	Mathias Emilsen
17	MF	NOR	Tobias Christensen
18	DF	NOR	Fredrik Holmé
19	FW	NOR	Seedy Jatta
20	MF	NOR	Magnus Bech Riisnæs
21	GK	NOR	Mathias Dyngeland (on loan from Elfsborg)
22	DF	NOR	Ivan Näsberg
26	MF	NOR	Osame Sahraoui
29	DF	NOR	Oskar Opsahl
38	GK	NOR	Magnus Smelhus Sjøeng

=== Out on loan ===
Note: Flags indicate national team as defined under FIFA eligibility rules; some limited exceptions apply. Players may hold more than one non-FIFA nationality.

No. / Pos. / Nation / Player; 6 / MF / NOR / Sakarias Opsahl (on loan at Tromsø until 31 December 2021)	No. / Pos. / Nation / Player; — / FW / GUI / Ousmane Camara (on loan at Dila Gori until 31 December 2021)

== Transfers ==
=== Winter ===
In: Note: Flags indicate national team as defined under FIFA eligibility rules; some limited exceptions apply. Players may hold more than one non-FIFA nationality.

No.	Pos.	Nation	Player
6	MF	NOR	Sakarias Opsahl (loan return from Tromsø)
11	FW	TUN	Amor Layouni (from (Egypt) Pyramids)
14	FW	NOR	Henrik Udahl (from Åsane)
16	MF	NOR	Mathias Emilsen (promoted from junior squad)
17	MF	NOR	Tobias Christensen (from Molde)
18	MF	NOR	Fredrik Holmé (loan return from Ull/Kisa)
19	FW	NOR	Seedy Jatta (promoted from junior squad)
20	MF	NOR	Magnus Bech Riisnæs (promoted from junior squad)

Out: Note: Flags indicate national team as defined under FIFA eligibility rules; some limited exceptions apply. Players may hold more than one non-FIFA nationality.

No.	Pos.	Nation	Player
3	DF	NOR	Johan Lædre Bjørdal (retired)
5	DF	URU	Felipe Carvalho (to (Bolivia) Bolívar)
6	MF	KOS	Herolind Shala (to Stabæk)
8	MF	NOR	Magnus Lekven (to Odd)
10	FW	ISL	Matthías Vilhjálmsson (to (Iceland) FH Hafnarfjordur)
11	FW	NOR	Bård Finne (to (Denmark) SønderjyskE)
17	MF	GUI	Ousmane Camara (on loan to (Georgia (country)) Dila Gori)
20	FW	NOR	Benjamin Stokke (to Mjøndalen)
–	MF	GHA	Mohammed Abu (released, previously on loan at (United States) D.C. United)
—	MF	NOR	Brede Sandmoen (released, previously on loan at Strømmen)

=== Summer ===
In: Note: Flags indicate national team as defined under FIFA eligibility rules; some limited exceptions apply. Players may hold more than one non-FIFA nationality.

No.	Pos.	Nation	Player
5	DF	MKD	Leonard Zuta (from (Italy) Lecce)
6	MF	DEN	Nicolaj Thomsen (from (Denmark) F.C. Copenhagen)
10	FW	SWE	Albin Mörfelt (from (Sweden) Varberg)
21	GK	NOR	Mathias Dyngeland (on loan from (Sweden) Elfsborg)
27	FW	NOR	Jacob Dicko Eng (promoted from junior squad)
38	GK	NOR	Magnus Sjøeng (promoted from junior squad)

Out: Note: Flags indicate national team as defined under FIFA eligibility rules; some limited exceptions apply. Players may hold more than one non-FIFA nationality.

No.	Pos.	Nation	Player
6	MF	NOR	Sakarias Opsahl (on loan to Tromsø)
10	FW	NOR	Aron Dønnum (to (Belgium) Standard Liège)
13	GK	NOR	Kristoffer Klaesson (to (England) Leeds)
23	MF	NOR	Felix Horn Myhre (to Brann)
25	DF	CAN	Sam Adekugbe (to (Turkey) Hatayspor)
33	DF	NOR	Amin Nouri (to Sogndal)

== Competitions ==
=== Eliteserien ===
==== Results summary ====
Overall								Home						Away					
Pld	W	D	L	GF	GA	GD	Pts	W	D	L	GF	GA	GD	W	D	L	GF	GA	GD
30	11	12	7	46	37	+9	45	7	7	1	27	14	+13	4	5	6	19	23	−4

Last updated: 12 December 2021.

==== Results by round ====
Round	1	2	3	4	5	6	7	8	9	10	11	12	13	14	15	16	17	18	19	20	21	22	23	24	25	26	27	28	29	30
Ground	H	A	H	A	A	H	A	H	A	H	A	H	A	H	A	H	H	A	H	A	H	A	H	A	H	A	H	A	H	A
Result	D	W	L	D	W	W	L	D	W	W	D	D	L	D	D	D	W	L	D	L	W	D	W	L	W	D	D	W	W	L
Position	6	4	7	10	7	5	7	6	5	3	4	4	6	7	7	7	7	8	8	9	7	7	7	7	7	7	7	7	6	7

A = Away; H = Home; W = Win; D = Draw; L = Loss

==== Results ====
9 May 2021 1	Vålerenga	1–1	Rosenborg	Oslo
20:00 CEST (UTC+2)	Hovland 39' (o.g.)	Report	Hovland (yellow card) 9'; Zachariassen 44', (yellow card) 63'; Andersson (yellow card) 57'; Hoff (yellow card) 88'	Stadium: Intility Arena; Attendance: 0 Referee: Tore Hansen

12 May 2021 2	Brann	0–3	Vålerenga	Bergen
20:00 CEST (UTC+2)		Report	Christensen (yellow card) 45+1'; Sahraoui 65'; Borchgrevink (yellow card) 84'; Dønnum 89'; Dønnum (yellow card) 90+1'	Stadium: Brann Stadion; Attendance: 600; Referee: Dag Vidar Hafsås

16 May 2021 3	Vålerenga	1–2	Kristiansund	Oslo
15:00 CEST (UTC+2)	Dønnum (penalty missed) 58'; Kjartansson 90+2'	Report	Strand Nilsen 41'; D. P. Ulvestad 56'; Sivertsen (yellow card) 59'	Stadium: Intility Arena; Attendance: 0 Referee: Svein Oddvar Moen

24 May 2021 4	Mjøndalen	1–1	Vålerenga	Mjøndalen
18:00 CEST (UTC+2)	Brochmann (penalty missed) 15'; Stokke (yellow card) 15'; Nakkim (yellow card) 51'; Rønning Ovenstad 52'	Report	Borchgrevink (yellow card) 13'; Klaesson (yellow card) 14'; Tollås Nation 83'; Dønnum (yellow card) 90+5'	Stadium: Consto Arena; Attendance: 200; Referee: Kai Erik Steen

27 May 2021 5	Molde	2–3	Vålerenga	Molde
20:00 CEST (UTC+2)	Haugen 39', 47', (yellow card) 84'	Report	Borchgrevink 2'; Bjørdal (yellow card) 30'; Layouni 64'; Dønnum 81'	Stadium: Aker Stadion; Attendance: 600; Referee: Tom Harald Hagen

30 May 2021 6	Vålerenga	3–1	Sandefjord	Oslo
18:00 CEST (UTC+2)	Tollås Nation 39'; Layouni 61'; Dønnum (yellow card) 64', (goal) 70' (pen.)	Report	Moen Foss (yellow card) 28', (goal) 67'; (yellow card) 64' Vales	Stadium: Intility Arena; Attendance: 50; Referee: Kristoffer Hagenes

13 June 2021 7	Viking	4–1	Vålerenga	Stavanger
20:00 CEST (UTC+2)	Berisha (yellow card) 42', (goal) 45+3', 57' (pen.); Friðjónsson 73', (yellow card) 73'; Tripic (yellow card) 81'; Austbø (yellow card) 87'; Pattynama 90'	Report	Näsberg (yellow card) 28'; Udahl 36'; Skaret (yellow card) 54'; Borchgrevink (yellow card) 60'; Christensen (yellow card) 64'; Layouni (yellow card) 90+1'	Stadium: Viking Stadion; Attendance: 600; Referee: Tore Hansen

16 June 2021 14	Vålerenga	1–1	Odd	Oslo
20:00 CEST (UTC+2)	Udahl 11'	Report	John Kitolano (yellow card) 23'; Bakenga 43' (pen.); Kaasa (yellow card) 90+2'	Stadium: Intility Arena; Attendance: 600; Referee: Svein Oddvar Moen

20 June 2021 8	Vålerenga	1–1	Bodø/Glimt	Oslo
20:00 CEST (UTC+2)	Tollås Nation 67'; Layouni (yellow card) 90+6'	Report	Solbakken 53'; Bjørkan (yellow card) 70'	Stadium: Intility Arena; Attendance: 2,000; Referee: Rohit Saggi

24 June 2021 9	Stabæk	0–2	Vålerenga	Bærum
20:00 CEST (UTC+2)	Sandberg (red card) 49'	Report	Borchgrevink 86'; Jatta 90+2'	Stadium: Nadderud Stadion; Attendance: 1,492; Referee: Tore Hansen

1 July 2021 10	Vålerenga	4–1	Sarpsborg 08	Oslo
20:00 CEST (UTC+2)	Udahl 43'; Udahl 65'; Tollås Nation (yellow card) 67'; Borchgrevink 70'; Holm 75'	Report	Thomassen (yellow card) 18'; Næss (yellow card) 67'; Näsberg 80' (o.g.)	Stadium: Intility Arena; Attendance: 3,893; Referee: Kristoffer Hagenes

4 July 2021 11	Strømsgodset	1–1	Vålerenga	Drammen
20:00 CEST (UTC+2)	Friday 19'; Fjeld Gulliksen (yellow card) 50'; Stengel (yellow card) 90+1'	Report	Sahraoui (yellow card) 3'; Bjørdal 67'; Adekugbe (yellow card) 90+1'	Stadium: Marienlyst Stadion; Attendance: 2,000; Referee: Tom Harald Hagen

11 July 2021 12	Vålerenga	2–2	Lillestrøm	Oslo
15:30 CEST (UTC+2)	Dønnum 53'; Näsberg (yellow card) 67'; Udahl 84'	Report	Ogbu (yellow card) 10'; Ranger 24'; T. L. Olsen 43'; Dragsnes (yellow card) 62'; Edh (yellow card) 79'	Stadium: Intility Arena; Attendance: 6,147; Referee: Kai Erik Steen

18 July 2021 13	Haugesund	3–1	Vålerenga	Haugesund
18:00 CEST (UTC+2)	Krygård 54', (yellow card) 84'; Wadji 57', 62'	Report	Bjørdal (yellow card) 31'; Dønnum 52' (pen.); Adekugbe (yellow card) 59'; Borchgrevink (yellow card) 64'	Stadium: Haugesund Stadion; Attendance: 2,000; Referee: Mohammad Usman Aslam

15 August 2021 15	Tromsø	1–1	Vålerenga	Tromsø
18:00 CEST (UTC+2)	Helstad Amundsen (yellow card) 55'; Mikkelsen (yellow card) 56'; Moses 65'; Gundersen (yellow card) 90+1'	Report	Zuta (yellow card) 41'; Bjørdal 75'; Mörfelt (yellow card) 90+3'	Stadium: Alfheim Stadion; Attendance: 1,820; Referee: Marius Hansen Grøtta

22 August 2021 16	Vålerenga	1–1	Viking	Oslo
18:00 CEST (UTC+2)	Kjartansson 11'; Layouni (yellow card) 25'; Tollås Nation (yellow card) 65'	Report	Nilsen Tangen (yellow card) 48', (goal) 84'	Stadium: Intility Arena; Attendance: 5,184; Referee: Tore Hansen

29 August 2021 17	Vålerenga	3–1	Stabæk	Oslo
20:00 CEST (UTC+2)	Layouni 14'; Holm (yellow card) 45'; Christensen (yellow card) 48', (goal) 54', 59'	Report	Normann Hansen (yellow card) 30'; Bolly 90+2'	Stadium: Intility Arena; Attendance: 4,579; Referee: Kai Erik Steen

12 September 2021 18	Sandefjord	3–0	Vålerenga	Sandefjord
20:00 CEST (UTC+2)	Kurtovic 43'; Oldrup Jensen 61' (o.g.); Jónsson 74'	Report	Zuta (yellow card) 55'	Stadium: Release Arena; Attendance: 1,800; Referee: Svein Oddvar Moen

19 September 2021 19	Vålerenga	1–1	Molde	Oslo
18:00 CEST (UTC+2)	Layouni (yellow card) 18'; Bjørdal 31' (pen.)	Report	Ulland Andersen (yellow card) 41'; Ellingsen 44' (pen.); Hussain (yellow card) 51'	Stadium: Intility Arena; Attendance: 7,084; Referee: Mohammad Usman Aslam

26 September 2021 20	Bodø/Glimt	1–0	Vålerenga	Bodø
20:00 CEST (UTC+2)	Botheim 79'	Report		Stadium: Aspmyra Stadion; Attendance: 3,724; Referee: Kristoffer Hagenes

3 October 2021 21	Vålerenga	3–0	Strømsgodset	Oslo
18:00 CEST (UTC+2)	Kjartansson 9'; Christensen 42'; Zuta 47'	Report	Leifsson (yellow card) 44'; Jack (yellow card) 53'; Valsvik (red card) 76'	Stadium: Intility Arena; Attendance: 6,430; Referee: Christian Moen

17 October 2021 22	Rosenborg	2–2	Vålerenga	Trondheim
19:00 CEST (UTC+2)	Vecchia 24'; Henriksen (yellow card) 26' (yellow-red card) 42'; E. Ceide 58', (yellow card) 66'	Report	Jatta 20'; Holm 68'	Stadium: Lerkendal Stadion; Attendance: 16,618; Referee: Rohit Saggi

24 October 2021 23	Vålerenga	2–1	Haugesund	Oslo
17:00 CEST (UTC+2)	Sahraoui 80'; Thomsen 87'	Report	Therkildsen 35'; Liseth (yellow card) 56'; Tiedemann Hansen (yellow card) 89'	Stadium: Intility Arena; Attendance: 5,035; Referee: Tore Hansen

28 October 2021 24	Sarpsborg 08	2–1	Vålerenga	Sarpsborg
20:00 CEST (UTC+2)	Thomassen (yellow card) 33'; Lindseth 81'; Muhammed 90+6'	Report	Kjartansson 69'	Stadium: Sarpsborg Stadion; Attendance: 4,801; Referee: Tom Harald Hagen

31 October 2021 25	Vålerenga	1–0	Brann	Oslo
20:00 CET (UTC+1)	Kjartansson 44'	Report		Stadium: Intility Arena; Attendance: 6,193; Referee: Svein Oddvar Moen

7 November 2021 26	Lillestrøm	0–0	Vålerenga	Lillestrøm
19:00 CET (UTC+1)	Gustafsson (yellow card) 70'	Report	Tollås Nation (yellow card) 70'	Stadium: Åråsen Stadion; Attendance: 10,504; Referee: Kristoffer Hagenes

21 November 2021 27	Vålerenga	1–1	Tromsø	Oslo
17:00 CET (UTC+1)	Oldrup Jensen 52'	Report	Psyché (yellow card) 14'; Helstad Amundsen (yellow card) 66'; Gundersen (yellow card) 77'; Arnarson 81'	Stadium: Intility Arena; Attendance: 4,822; Referee: Sigurd Smehus Kringstad

27 November 2021 28	Odd	1–2	Vålerenga	Skien
18:00 CET (UTC+1)	Lauritsen 34'; Josh. Kitolano (yellow card) 58'; Aas (yellow card) 83'	Report	Holm 4', (yellow card) 9'; Bjørdal 75' (pen.); Sahraoui (yellow card) 90+7'	Stadium: Skagerak Arena; Attendance: 3,685; Referee: Tom Harald Hagen

5 December 2021 29	Vålerenga	2–0	Mjøndalen	Oslo
17:00 CET (UTC+1)	Oldrup Jensen 67'; Udahl 80'	Report	Twum (yellow card) 66'	Stadium: Intility Arena; Attendance: 4,112; Referee: Tore Hansen

12 December 2021 30	Kristiansund	2–1	Vålerenga	Kristiansund
17:00 CET (UTC+1)	Willumsson (yellow card) 23'; Coly (yellow card) 28'; Bye 66'; Isaksen (yellow card) 71'; Mawa 81' (pen.), (yellow card) 85'	Report	Zuta (yellow card) 45'; Williamsen 78' (o.g.); Borchgrevink (yellow card) 81'; Bjørdal (yellow card) 85'	Stadium: Kristiansund Stadion; Attendance: 3,522; Referee: Marius Hansen Grøtta

==== Table ====
Pos	Team	Pld	W	D	L	GF	GA	GD	Pts
5	Rosenborg	30	13	9	8	58	42	+16	48
6	Kristiansund	30	14	4	12	41	46	−5	46
7	Vålerenga	30	11	12	7	46	37	+9	45
8	Sarpsborg 08	30	11	6	13	39	44	−5	39
9	Strømsgodset	30	9	9	12	43	43	0	36

Source: Football Association of Norway (in Norwegian)
Rules for classification: 1) Points; 2) Goal difference; 3) Goals scored; 4) Head-to-head points; 5) Head-to-head goal difference; 6) Head-to-head away goals scored (only if between two teams); 7) Head-to-head goals scored; 8) Play-off (only used to decide champions or relegation).

=== Norwegian Cup ===
25 July 2021 First round	Lyn	0–4	Vålerenga	Oslo
16:15 CEST (UTC+2)	Roland (yellow card) 24'; H. L. Olsen (yellow card) 49'	Report	Skaret 18'; Bjørdal 27'; Udahl 49'; Christensen 70'	Stadium: Bislett Stadium; Attendance: 2,651; Referee: Mohammad Usman Aslam

1 August 2021 Second round	Ullern	1–3 (a.e.t.)	Vålerenga	Oslo
16:00 CEST (UTC+2)	Badou Jor (yellow card) 66'; L. Følstad 86'; Øverby (yellow card) 97'	Report	Holm (yellow card) 48'; Christensen 82', (yellow card) 103'; Oldrup Jensen 92'; Jatta 95'	Stadium: Ullern Kunstgress; Attendance: 721; Referee: Stian Røvig Sletner

22 September 2021 Third round	Vålerenga	0–3	Odd	Oslo
18:00 CEST (UTC+2)	Bjørdal (yellow card) 68'; Oldrup Jensen (yellow card) 72'; Sahraoui (yellow card) 83' (yellow-red card) 84'	Report	Jevtović 20'; Svendsen 58', 60'	Stadium: Intility Arena; Attendance: 2,913; Referee: Kai Erik Steen

=== UEFA Europa Conference League ===
==== Second qualifying round ====
22 July 2021 First leg	Gent (Belgium)	4–0	(Norway) Vålerenga	Ghent, Belgium
20:30 CEST (UTC+2)	Bruno 11'; Tissoudali 39'; Odjidja-Ofoe 56'; Malede 88'; De Sart (yellow card) 90+4'	Report	Bjørdal (yellow card) 58'; Sahraoui (yellow card) 70'; Borchgrevink (yellow card) 78'	Stadium: Ghelamco Arena; Attendance: 3,823; Referee: Mario Zebec (Croatia)

29 July 2021 Second leg	Vålerenga (Norway)	2–0 (2–4 agg.)	(Belgium) Gent	Oslo, Norway
19:00 CEST (UTC+2)	Okumu 11' (o.g.); Holm (yellow card) 69'; Adekugbe (yellow card) 76'; Näsberg 81'	Report	Fortuna (yellow card) 71'	Stadium: Intility Arena; Attendance: 2,000; Referee: Donald Robertson (Scotland)

== Squad statistics ==
As of match played 12 December 2021

=== Appearances and goals ===
No.	Pos	Nat	Player	Total		Eliteserien		Norwegian Cup		UEFA Europa Conference League	
No.	Pos	Nat	Player	Apps	Goals	Apps	Goals	Apps	Goals	Apps	Goals
1	GK	(Norway) NOR	Kjetil Haug	18	0	14	0	3	0	1	0
2	DF	(Norway) NOR	Christian Borchgrevink	28	3	23+1	3	2	0	2	0
3	DF	(Norway) NOR	Brage Skaret	10	1	5+3	0	2	1	0	0
4	DF	(Norway) NOR	Jonatan Tollås	33	3	28	3	3	0	2	0
5	DF	(North Macedonia) MKD	Leonard Zuta	18	1	16	1	2	0	0	0
6	MF	(Denmark) DEN	Nicolaj Thomsen	13	1	1+11	1	0+1	0	0	0
7	MF	(Norway) NOR	Fredrik Jensen	35	3	30	2	3	1	2	0
8	MF	(Norway) NOR	Henrik Bjørdal	35	5	30	4	3	1	2	0
9	FW	(Iceland) ISL	Viðar Kjartansson	19	5	17+1	5	1	0	0	0
10	MF	(Sweden) SWE	Albin Mörfelt	4	0	0+4	0	0	0	0	0
11	FW	(Tunisia) TUN	Amor Layouni	30	3	27+1	3	1	0	1	0
14	FW	(Norway) NOR	Henrik Udahl	30	7	11+14	6	2+1	1	0+2	0
15	MF	(Norway) NOR	Odin Holm	24	3	9+10	3	3	0	1+1	0
16	MF	(Norway) NOR	Mathias Emilsen	6	0	0+3	0	0+2	0	0+1	0
17	MF	(Norway) NOR	Tobias Christensen	35	5	23+7	3	2+1	2	2	0
18	DF	(Norway) NOR	Fredrik Holmé	3	0	0+1	0	1+1	0	0	0
19	FW	(Norway) NOR	Seedy Jatta	29	3	7+17	2	0+3	1	2	0
20	MF	(Norway) NOR	Magnus Riisnæs	3	0	0+1	0	0+2	0	0	0
21	GK	(Norway) NOR	Mathias Dyngeland	3	0	2+1	0	0	0	0	0
22	DF	(Norway) NOR	Ivan Näsberg	29	1	26	0	1	0	2	1
26	FW	(Norway) NOR	Osame Sahraoui	32	2	24+3	2	3	0	2	0
27	FW	(Norway) NOR	Jacob Eng	10	0	0+6	0	0+3	0	0+1	0
29	DF	(Norway) NOR	Oskar Opsahl	3	0	0	0	1	0	0+2	0
Players away from Vålerenga on loan:
6	MF	(Norway) NOR	Sakarias Opsahl	2	0	0+2	0	0	0	0	0
Players who left Vålerenga during the season
10	MF	(Norway) NOR	Aron Dønnum	10	6	9+1	6	0	0	0	0
13	GK	(Norway) NOR	Kristoffer Klaesson	15	0	14	0	0	0	1	0
23	MF	(Norway) NOR	Felix Myhre	6	0	2+4	0	0	0	0	0
25	DF	(Canada) CAN	Sam Adekugbe	14	0	12	0	0	0	2	0

=== Goal scorers ===
Place	Position	Nation	Number	Name	Eliteserien	Norwegian Cup	UEFA Europa Conference League	Total
1	FW	(Norway)	14	Henrik Udahl	6	1	0	7
2	MF	(Norway)	10	Aron Dønnum	6	0	0	6
3	FW	(Iceland)	9	Viðar Kjartansson	5	0	0	5
3	MF	(Norway)	8	Henrik Bjørdal	4	1	0	5
3	MF	(Norway)	17	Tobias Christensen	3	2	0	5
6	DF	(Norway)	2	Christian Borchgrevink	3	0	0	3
6	DF	(Norway)	4	Jonatan Tollås	3	0	0	3
6	FW	(Tunisia)	11	Amor Layouni	3	0	0	3
6	MF	(Norway)	15	Odin Holm	3	0	0	3
6	MF	(Norway)	7	Fredrik Jensen	2	1	0	3
6	FW	(Norway)	19	Seedy Jatta	2	1	0	3
6				Own goal	2	0	1	3
13	FW	(Norway)	26	Osame Sahraoui	2	0	0	2
14	DF	(North Macedonia)	5	Leonard Zuta	1	0	0	1
14	MF	(Denmark)	6	Nicolaj Thomsen	1	0	0	1
14	DF	(Norway)	3	Brage Skaret	0	1	0	1
14	FW	(Norway)	22	Ivan Näsberg	0	0	1	1
				TOTALS	46	7	2	55

=== Clean sheets ===
Place	Position	Nation	Number	Name	Eliteserien	Norwegian Cup	UEFA Europa Conference League	Total
1	GK	(Norway)	1	Kjetil Haug	3	1	1	5
2	GK	(Norway)	13	Kristoffer Klaesson	2	0	0	2
3	GK	(Norway)	21	Mathias Dyngeland	1	0	0	1
				TOTALS	6	1	1	8

=== Disciplinary record ===
Number	Nation	Position	Name	Eliteserien		Norwegian Cup		UEFA Europa Conference League		Total	
Number	Nation	Position	Name	Booked	Sent off (straight red)	Booked	Sent off (straight red)	Booked	Sent off (straight red)	Booked	Sent off (straight red)
2	(Norway)	DF	Christian Borchgrevink	5	0	0	0	1	0	6	0
3	(Norway)	DF	Brage Skaret	1	0	0	0	0	0	1	0
4	(Norway)	DF	Jonatan Tollås	3	0	0	0	0	0	3	0
5	(North Macedonia)	DF	Leonard Zuta	3	0	0	0	0	0	3	0
7	(Norway)	MF	Fredrik Jensen	0	0	1	0	0	0	1	0
8	(Norway)	MF	Henrik Bjørdal	3	0	1	0	1	0	4	0
10	(Sweden)	MF	Albin Mörfelt	1	0	0	0	0	0	1	0
11	(Tunisia)	FW	Amor Layouni	4	0	0	0	0	0	4	0
15	(Norway)	MF	Odin Holm	2	0	1	0	1	0	3	0
17	(Norway)	MF	Tobias Christensen	3	0	1	0	0	0	4	0
22	(Norway)	DF	Ivan Näsberg	2	0	0	0	0	0	2	0
26	(Norway)	MF	Osame Sahraoui	2	0	2	1	1	0	5	1
Players who left Vålerenga during the season:
10	(Norway)	MF	Aron Dønnum	2	0	0	0	0	0	2	0
13	(Norway)	GK	Kristoffer Klaesson	1	0	0	0	0	0	1	0
25	(Canada)	DF	Sam Adekugbe	2	0	0	0	1	0	3	0
			TOTALS	34	0	6	1	5	0	45	1
