= 2020 Vålerenga Fotball season =

Vålerenga
2020 season
- Chairman: Thomas Baardseng
- Manager: Dag-Eilev Fagermo
- Stadium: Intility Arena
- Eliteserien: 3rd
- Norwegian Cup: Canceled due to the COVID-19 pandemic
- Top goalscorer: League: Viðar Kjartansson (9); All: Viðar Kjartansson (9)
Home colours	Away colours

The 2020 season was Vålerenga's nineteenth season in the Eliteserien since their promotion in 2001.

== Season events ==
Prior to the start of the season, Osame Sahraoui, Brage Skaret and Brede Sandmoen were promoted from the youth team.

On 31 January, Dag-Eilev Fagermo was appointed as Vålerenga's manager after Ronny Deila had left for New York City earlier in the month.

On 12 June, the Norwegian Football Federation announced that a maximum of 200 home fans would be allowed to attend the upcoming seasons matches.

On 8 June, Fredrik Holmé was promoted to the Vålerenga first team.

On 30 September, the Minister of Culture and Gender Equality, Abid Raja, announced that clubs would be able to have crowds of 600 at games from 12 October.

== Squad ==
Note: Flags indicate national team as defined under FIFA eligibility rules; some limited exceptions apply. Players may hold more than one non-FIFA nationality.

No.	Pos.	Nation	Player
1	GK	NOR	Kjetil Haug
2	DF	NOR	Christian Dahle Borchgrevink
3	DF	NOR	Johan Bjørdal (vice-captain)
4	DF	NOR	Jonatan Tollås (Captain)
5	DF	URU	Felipe Carvalho
6	MF	KOS	Herolind Shala
7	MF	NOR	Henrik Bjørdal
8	MF	NOR	Magnus Lekven
9	MF	NOR	Aron Dønnum
10	FW	ISL	Matthías Vilhjálmsson
11	FW	NOR	Bård Finne
13	GK	NOR	Kristoffer Klaesson
14	MF	NOR	Fredrik Jensen
15	FW	NOR	Odin Holm
17	MF	GUI	Ousmane Camara

No.	Pos.	Nation	Player
18	DF	NOR	Fredrik Holmé
20	FW	NOR	Benjamin Stokke
22	DF	NOR	Ivan Näsberg
23	MF	NOR	Felix Myhre
24	FW	ISL	Viðar Örn Kjartansson
25	DF	CAN	Sam Adekugbe
26	MF	MAR	Osame Sahraoui
29	DF	NOR	Oskar Opsahl
31	DF	NOR	Brage Skaret
33	DF	NOR	Amin Nouri
34	FW	NOR	Sixten Abrahamsen
35	MF	NOR	Marcus Melchior
36	MF	KOS	Florind Lokaj
37	DF	NOR	Martin Bech Riisnæs
38	GK	NOR	Magnus Smelhus Sjøeng

=== Out on loan ===
Note: Flags indicate national team as defined under FIFA eligibility rules; some limited exceptions apply. Players may hold more than one non-FIFA nationality.

No.	Pos.	Nation	Player
14	MF	GHA	Mohammed Abu (at D.C. United until 31 December 2020)
20	MF	NOR	Sakarias Opsahl (at Tromsø until 31 December 2020)

No.	Pos.	Nation	Player
36	FW	NOR	Sander Haugaard Werni (at Ull/Kisa until 31 December 2020)

== Transfers ==
=== In ===
Date	Position	Nationality	Name	From	Fee	Ref.
14 February 2020	MF	(Norway)	Fredrik Jensen	Zulte Waregem	Undisclosed	
23 June 2020	FW	(Norway)	Benjamin Stokke	Randers	Undisclosed	
28 August 2020	FW	(Iceland)	Viðar Örn Kjartansson	Rostov	Undisclosed	
8 September 2020	MF	(Norway)	Henrik Bjørdal	Zulte Waregem	Undisclosed	

=== Out ===
Date	Position	Nationality	Name	To	Fee	Ref.
14 January 2020	FW	(Norway)	Fitim Azemi	Stabæk/Grorud	Undisclosed	
18 January 2020	MF	(Iceland)	Samúel Friðjónsson	Paderborn	Undisclosed	
21 January 2020	DF	(Norway)	Leo Cornic	Grorud	Undisclosed	
16 March 2020	MF	(Sweden)	Erik Israelsson	Kalmar	Undisclosed	
1 October 2020	FW	(Nigeria)	Peter Godly Michael	Sogndal	Undisclosed	

=== Loans out ===
Date from	Position	Nationality	Name	to	Date to	Ref.
16 February 2020	MF	(Norway)	Sakarias Opsahl	Tromsø	End of season	
3 March 2020	MF	(Ghana)	Mohammed Abu	D.C. United	End of season	
1 June 2020	MF	(Norway)	Brede Sandmoen	Strømmen	End of season	
26 June 2020	FW	(Nigeria)	Peter Godly Michael	Øygarden	1 October 2020	

=== Released ===
Date	Position	Nationality	Name	Joined	Date
28 December 2019	DF	(Denmark)	Pierre Kanstrup	SønderjyskE	
28 December 2019	DF	(Mexico)	Efraín Juárez	Retired	9 January 2020
28 December 2019	MF	(Norway)	Mohammed Fellah		
31 December 2019	DF	(Norway)	Markus Nakkim	Mjøndalen	
3 August 2020	GK	(Ghana)	Adam Larsen Kwarasey		
8 September 2020	FW	(Costa Rica)	Deyver Vega	Sandefjord	10 September 2020

== Competitions ==
=== Eliteserien ===
==== Results summary ====
Overall								Home						Away					
Pld	W	D	L	GF	GA	GD	Pts	W	D	L	GF	GA	GD	W	D	L	GF	GA	GD
30	15	10	5	51	33	+18	55	10	5	0	33	13	+20	5	5	5	18	20	−2

Last updated: 22 December 2020.
Source: Results

==== Results by round ====
Round	1	2	3	4	5	6	7	8	9	10	11	12	13	14	15	16	17	18	19	20	21	22	23	24	25	26	27	28	29	30
Ground	A	H	A	H	A	H	A	H	A	H	A	A	H	A	H	A	H	H	A	H	A	H	A	H	A	H	A	H	A	H
Result	W	D	L	W	D	D	W	W	D	W	L	W	D	L	W	L	W	W	L	W	W	D	W	W	D	D	D	W	D	W
Position	5	6	9	6	8	6	4	3	3	3	4	4	4	5	5	6	5	5	5	4	3	4	5	4	3	3	3	3	3	3

Updated to match(es) played on 22 December 2020. Source: Results
A = Away; H = Home; W = Win; D = Draw; L = Loss

==== Results ====
16 June 2020 1	Sarpsborg 08	0–1	Vålerenga	Sarpsborg
20:30 CEST (UTC+2)	Bojang (yellow card) 43'; Salétros (yellow card) 61'; Halvorsen (yellow card) 83'	Report	Borchgrevink (yellow card) 12'; Dønnum (yellow card) 16' (goal) 41'; Shala (yellow card) 60'; Jensen (yellow card) 67'; Klaesson (yellow card) 90+5'	Stadium: Sarpsborg Stadion; Attendance: 200; Referee: Tom Harald Hagen

21 June 2020 2	Vålerenga	2–2	Stabæk	Oslo
18:00 CEST (UTC+2)	Shala 16' (yellow card) 28' (yellow-red card) 55'; Lekven (yellow card) 32'; Myhre (yellow card) 68'; Dønnum (yellow card) 69'; Vilhjálmsson 72' (pen.)	Report	Kassi 38'; Edvardsen 40'; Hanche-Olsen (yellow card) 43'; Solheim (yellow card) 77'; Bohinen (yellow card) 81'	Stadium: Intility Arena; Attendance: 200; Referee: Rohit Saggi
Note: Match played in-front of maximum capacity of 200 fans due to the COVID-19 pandemic in Norway.

24 June 2020 3	Odd	4–1	Vålerenga	Skien
20:30 CEST (UTC+2)	Hoff 12'; Kachi (yellow card) 20'; Børven 60', 67' (pen.), 90+2'; Rashani (yellow card) 85'	Report	Vilhjálmsson 6' (pen.); Adekugbe (yellow card) 37'; Lekven (yellow card) 67'; Myhre (yellow card) 69'	Stadium: Skagerak Arena; Attendance: 200; Referee: Svein Oddvar Moen

27 June 2020 4	Vålerenga	2–1	Viking	Oslo
20:30 CEST (UTC+2)	Vilhjálmsson 18' (penalty missed) 61'; Shala (yellow card) 25'; Näsberg (yellow card) 56'; Vega 86'	Report	Vikstøl (yellow card) 17'; Østensen (yellow card) 48'; Ibrahimaj 71'	Stadium: Intility Arena; Attendance: 200; Referee: Espen Eskås

1 July 2020 5	Rosenborg	1–1	Vålerenga	Trondheim
20:30 CEST (UTC+2)	Hedenstad (yellow card) 3'; Lundemo 20'; Zachariassen (yellow card) 56'; Holse (yellow card) 74'	Report	Borchgrevink (yellow card) 76'; Näsberg 79'; Myhre (yellow card) 87'	Stadium: Lerkendal Stadion; Attendance: 200; Referee: Kai Erik Steen
Note: Match played in-front of maximum capacity of 200 fans due to the COVID-19 pandemic in Norway.

4 July 2020 6	Vålerenga	2–2	Aalesund	Oslo
20:30 CEST (UTC+2)	Jensen (yellow card) 30'; Adekugbe (yellow card) 49' (yellow-red card) 69'; Stokke 63'; Finne 65'	Report	Klinkenberg (yellow card) 24'; Friðjónsson 34', 46'; Castro (yellow card) 62'	Stadium: Intility Arena; Attendance: 200; Referee: Tom Harald Hagen
Note: Match played in-front of maximum capacity of 200 fans due to the COVID-19 pandemic in Norway.

12 July 2020 7	Mjøndalen	0–1	Vålerenga	Mjøndalen
18:00 CEST (UTC+2)	Brustad (yellow card) 90+1'	Report	Jensen 13'; Klaesson (red card) 35'; Borchgrevink (yellow card) 55'; Haug (yellow card) 90+4'	Stadium: Consto Arena; Attendance: 200; Referee: Marius Hansen Grøtta

15 July 2020 8	Vålerenga	1–0	Haugesund	Oslo
18:00 CEST (UTC+2)	Stokke (yellow card) 25' (goal) 82'	Report	Velde (yellow card) 28'	Stadium: Intility Arena; Attendance: 200; Referee: Sigurd Smehus Kringstad

19 July 2020 9	Kristiansund	0–0	Vålerenga	Kristiansund
18:00 CEST (UTC+2)	Diop (yellow card) 40'	Report	Dønnum (yellow card) 68'; Sahraoui (yellow card) 77'; Bjørdal (yellow card) 90+3'	Stadium: Kristiansund Stadion; Attendance: 200; Referee: Mohammad Usman Aslam

26 July 2020 10	Vålerenga	2–0	Strømsgodset	Oslo
18:00 CEST (UTC+2)	Tollås (yellow card) 21'; Sahraoui 36'; Gunnarsson 48' (o.g.); Jensen (yellow card) 49'	Report		Stadium: Intility Arena; Attendance: 200; Referee: Tommy Skjerven

29 July 2020 11	Molde	4–1	Vålerenga	Molde
20:30 CEST (UTC+2)	Aursnes 28'; Bjørnbak (yellow card) 45'; Christensen 56' (yellow card) 58'; Omoijuanfo 78'; Hussain 90+1'	Report	Holm (yellow card) 7'; Finne 86'	Stadium: Aker Stadion; Attendance: 200; Referee: Kristoffer Hagenes
Note: Match played in-front of maximum capacity of 200 fans due to the COVID-19 pandemic in Norway.

1 August 2020 12	Brann	1–2	Vålerenga	Bergen
20:30 CEST (UTC+2)	Barmen 10' (pen.); Taylor (yellow card) 30'	Report	Finne 30' (pen.), 47' (pen.); Myhre (yellow card) 70'; Camara (yellow card) 83'; Klaesson (yellow card) 90+4'	Stadium: Brann Stadion; Attendance: 200; Referee: Svein Oddvar Moen
Note: Match played in-front of maximum capacity of 200 fans due to the COVID-19 pandemic in Norway.

8 August 2020 13	Vålerenga	2–2	Bodø/Glimt	Oslo
18:00 CEST (UTC+2)	Vilhjálmsson 1'; Borchgrevink (yellow card) 69'; Dønnum 75'; Lekven (yellow card) 90+1'	Report	J.Hauge 35'; Junker 45' (yellow card) 63'; Fet (yellow card) 78'	Stadium: Intility Arena; Attendance: 200; Referee: Kai Erik Steen

17 August 2020 14	Start	2–1	Vålerenga	Kristiansand
20:30 CEST (UTC+2)	Bergan (yellow card) 21'; Schulze 23', 90+4' (penalty missed) 47'; Ugland (yellow card) 36'; Kabran (yellow card) 45'	Report	Tollås (yellow card) 38'; Stokke 75'; Näsberg (yellow card) 87'	Stadium: Sør Arena; Attendance: 200; Referee: Tommy Skjerven

22 August 2020 15	Vålerenga	2–1	Sandefjord	Oslo
18:00 CEST (UTC+2)	Vilhjálmsson (yellow card) 54'; Bjørdal (yellow card) 76'; Finne 83', 89'	Report	Gussiås 10' (yellow card) 90'	Stadium: Intility Arena; Attendance: 200; Referee: Rohit Saggi

29 August 2020 16	Haugesund	2–1	Vålerenga	Haugesund
18:00 CEST (UTC+2)	Velde 16' (yellow card) 34'; Wadji 36'	Report	Vilhjálmsson 47' (yellow card) 69'; Bjørdal (yellow card) 74'	Stadium: Haugesund Stadion; Attendance: 200; Referee: Tom Harald Hagen

13 September 2020 17	Vålerenga	5–1	Brann	Oslo
20:00 CEST (UTC+2)	Sahraoui 4', 35'; Kjartansson 14', 16', 23'	Report	Strand 8' (yellow card) 65'	Stadium: Intility Arena; Attendance: 200; Referee: Tore Hansen

19 September 2020 18	Vålerenga	2–1	Molde	Oslo
18:00 CEST (UTC+2)	Kjartansson 21' (penalty missed) 47'; Borchgrevink (yellow card) 58'; Dønnum 83'	Report	Andersen (yellow card) 23'; Kitolano (red card) 47'; Wingo 90+5'	Stadium: Intility Arena; Attendance: 200; Referee: Kai Erik Steen

27 September 2020 19	Bodø/Glimt	2–0	Vålerenga	Bodø
20:30 CEST (UTC+2)	Junker 19'; Zinckernagel 38' (yellow card) 82'; J.Hauge (penalty missed) 47'; Lode (red card) 66'; Boniface (yellow card) 90+1'	Report	Dønnum (yellow card) 45+3'; Klaesson (yellow card) 47'	Stadium: Aspmyra Stadion; Attendance: 200; Referee: Tore Hansen

3 October 2020 20	Vålerenga	4–1	Mjøndalen	Oslo
20:30 CEST (UTC+2)	Finne 45', 75'; Bjørdal 67', 68'	Report	Twum (yellow card) 21'; Tollås 61' (o.g.)	Stadium: Intility Arena; Attendance: 200; Referee: Sivert Amland

18 October 2020 21	Sandefjord	0–3	Vålerenga	Sandefjord
20:30 CEST (UTC+2)	Kreuzriegler (yellow card) 78'; Wembangomo (yellow card) 90+1'	Report	Kjartansson 20', 68' (penalty missed) 48'; Dønnum 87'	Stadium: Sandefjord Arena; Attendance: 600; Referee: Tommy Skjerven

25 October 2020 22	Vålerenga	1–1	Kristiansund	Oslo
18:00 CET (UTC+1)	Kjartansson 59'	Report	Kalludra (yellow card) 52'; Bye 82'	Stadium: Intility Arena; Attendance: 200; Referee: Tom Harald Hagen

1 November 2020 23	Strømsgodset	0–2	Vålerenga	Drammen
20:30 CET (UTC+1)	Maigaard (yellow card) 45+1'; Gunnarsson (yellow card) 73'	Report	Bjørdal 15'; Dønnum (yellow card) 46+1'; Borchgrevink 76'	Stadium: Marienlyst Stadion; Attendance: 600; Referee: Kai Erik Steen

8 November 2020 24	Vålerenga	2–0	Odd	Oslo
20:30 CET (UTC+1)	Shala 39'; Vilhjálmsson 86'	Report	Bjørtuft (yellow card) 63'; Joh.Kitolano (yellow card) 86'; Ruud (yellow card) 88'	Stadium: Intility Arena; Attendance: 200; Referee: Rohit Saggi

21 November 2020 25	Aalesund	1–1	Vålerenga	Ålesund
18:00 CET (UTC+1)	Bizoza 32'; Karamoko (yellow card) 55'; Jørgensen (yellow card) 90+2'; Haugen (yellow card) 90+6'	Report	Dønnum 64' (pen.)	Stadium: Color Line Stadion; Attendance: 0 Referee: Tommy Skjerven

29 November 2020 26	Vålerenga	1–1	Sarpsborg 08	Oslo
20:00 CET (UTC+1)	Näsberg 90+6'	Report	Halvorsen 19'; Ofkir (yellow card) 90+2'	Stadium: Intility Arena; Attendance: 200; Referee: Tore Hansen

2 December 2020 27	Stabæk	1–1	Vålerenga	Bærum
20:00 CET (UTC+1)	Antonsson 65'	Report	Kjartansson 9'	Stadium: Nadderud Stadion; Attendance: 200; Referee: Dag Vidar Hafsås

7 December 2020 28	Vålerenga	1–0	Rosenborg	Oslo
18:00 CET (UTC+1)	Shala (yellow card) 23'; Näsberg (yellow card) 37'; Dønnum 76'	Report	Islamović (yellow card) 22' (yellow-red card) 45+1'; Reginiussen (yellow card) 32'; Henriksen (yellow card) 45+1'	Stadium: Intility Arena; Attendance: 200; Referee: Sigurd Smehus Kringstad

10 December 2020 29	Viking	2–2	Vålerenga	Stavanger
18:00 CET (UTC+1)	Berisha (yellow card) 41' (goal) 81'; Bytyqi 88'	Report	Dønnum 45+2', 49'	Stadium: Viking Stadion; Attendance: 600; Referee: Rohit Saggi

22 December 2020 30	Vålerenga	4–0	Start	Oslo
18:00 CET (UTC+1)	Kjartansson 5'; Wichne 14' (o.g.); Sahraoui 30'; Holm 85'	Report		Stadium: Intility Arena; Attendance: 200; Referee: Tom Harald Hagen

==== Table ====
Pos	Team	Pld	W	D	L	GF	GA	GD	Pts	Qualification or relegation
1	Bodø/Glimt (C)	30	26	3	1	103	32	+71	81	Qualification for the Champions League first qualifying round
2	Molde	30	20	2	8	77	36	+41	62	Qualification for the Europa Conference League second qualifying round
3	Vålerenga	30	15	10	5	51	33	+18	55	Qualification for the Europa Conference League second qualifying round
4	Rosenborg	30	15	7	8	50	35	+15	52	Qualification for the Europa Conference League second qualifying round
5	Kristiansund	30	12	12	6	57	45	+12	48	

Source: Football Association of Norway (in Norwegian)
Rules for classification: 1) Points; 2) Goal difference; 3) Goals scored; 4) Head-to-head points; 5) Head-to-head goal difference; 6) Head-to-head away goals scored (only if between two teams); 7) Head-to-head goals scored; 8) Play-off (only used to decide champions or relegation).
(C) Champions

=== Norwegian Cup ===
2020 First round	–
CEST (UTC+2)
Note: Cup cancelled on 10 September due to the COVID-19 pandemic in Norway.

== Squad statistics ==
As of match played 22 December 2020

=== Appearances and goals ===
No.	Pos	Nat	Player	Total		Eliteserien		Norwegian Cup	
No.	Pos	Nat	Player	Apps	Goals	Apps	Goals	Apps	Goals
1	GK	(Norway) NOR	Kjetil Haug	2	0	1+1	0	0	0
2	DF	(Norway) NOR	Christian Borchgrevink	29	1	29	1	0	0
3	DF	(Norway) NOR	Johan Bjørdal	12	0	8+4	0	0	0
4	DF	(Norway) NOR	Jonatan Tollås	23	0	23	0	0	0
6	MF	(Kosovo) KOS	Herolind Shala	26	2	21+5	2	0	0
7	MF	(Norway) NOR	Henrik Bjørdal	14	3	14	3	0	0
8	MF	(Norway) NOR	Magnus Lekven	28	0	27+1	0	0	0
9	MF	(Norway) NOR	Aron Dønnum	27	8	27	8	0	0
10	FW	(Iceland) ISL	Matthías Vilhjálmsson	29	6	18+11	6	0	0
11	FW	(Norway) NOR	Bård Finne	26	8	13+13	8	0	0
13	GK	(Norway) NOR	Kristoffer Klaesson	29	0	29	0	0	0
14	MF	(Norway) NOR	Fredrik Jensen	21	1	20+1	1	0	0
15	FW	(Norway) NOR	Odin Holm	14	1	1+13	1	0	0
17	MF	(Guinea) GUI	Ousmane Camara	4	0	0+4	0	0	0
20	FW	(Norway) NOR	Benjamin Stokke	15	3	5+10	3	0	0
22	DF	(Norway) NOR	Ivan Näsberg	29	2	29	2	0	0
23	MF	(Norway) NOR	Felix Myhre	23	0	6+17	0	0	0
24	FW	(Iceland) ISL	Viðar Kjartansson	13	9	13	9	0	0
25	DF	(Canada) CAN	Sam Adekugbe	26	0	25+1	0	0	0
26	MF	(Morocco) MAR	Osame Sahraoui	28	4	21+7	4	0	0
29	DF	(Norway) NOR	Oskar Opsahl	1	0	0+1	0	0	0
31	DF	(Norway) NOR	Brage Skaret	1	0	0+1	0	0	0
33	DF	(Norway) NOR	Amin Nouri	1	0	0+1	0	0	0
Players away from Vålerenga on loan:
Players who left Vålerenga during the season
7	FW	(Costa Rica) CRC	Deyver Vega	6	1	0+6	1	0	0

=== Goal scorers ===
Place	Position	Nation	Number	Name	Eliteserien	Norwegian Cup	Total
1	FW	(Iceland)	24	Viðar Kjartansson	9	0	9
2	FW	(Norway)	11	Bård Finne	8	0	8
2	MF	(Norway)	9	Aron Dønnum	8	0	8
4	FW	(Iceland)	10	Matthías Vilhjálmsson	6	0	6
5	MF	(Morocco)	26	Osame Sahraoui	4	0	4
6	FW	(Norway)	20	Benjamin Stokke	3	0	3
6	MF	(Norway)	7	Henrik Bjørdal	3	0	3
8	MF	(Kosovo)	6	Herolind Shala	2	0	2
8	DF	(Norway)	22	Ivan Näsberg	2	0	2
			Own goal	2	0	2	
11	FW	(Costa Rica)	7	Deyver Vega	1	0	1
11	MF	(Norway)	14	Fredrik Jensen	1	0	1
11	DF	(Norway)	2	Christian Borchgrevink	1	0	1
11	FW	(Norway)	15	Odin Holm	1	0	1
				TOTALS	51	0	51

=== Clean sheets ===
Place	Position	Nation	Number	Name	Eliteserien	Norwegian Cup	Total
1	GK	(Norway)	13	Kristoffer Klaesson	9	0	9
2	GK	(Norway)	1	Kjetil Haug	1	0	1
				TOTALS	10	0	10

=== Disciplinary record ===
Number	Nation	Position	Name	Eliteserien		Norwegian Cup		Total	
Number	Nation	Position	Name	Yellow card	Red card	Yellow card	Red card	Yellow card	Red card
1	(Norway)	GK	Kjetil Haug	1	0	0	0	1	0
2	(Norway)	DF	Christian Borchgrevink	5	0	0	0	5	0
3	(Norway)	DF	Johan Bjørdal	3	0	0	0	3	0
4	(Norway)	DF	Jonatan Tollås	2	0	0	0	2	0
6	(Kosovo)	MF	Herolind Shala	5	1	0	0	5	1
8	(Norway)	MF	Magnus Lekven	3	0	0	0	3	0
9	(Norway)	MF	Aron Dønnum	5	0	0	0	5	0
10	(Iceland)	FW	Matthías Vilhjálmsson	2	0	0	0	2	0
13	(Norway)	GK	Kristoffer Klaesson	3	1	0	0	3	1
14	(Norway)	MF	Fredrik Jensen	3	0	0	0	3	0
15	(Norway)	FW	Odin Holm	1	0	0	0	1	0
17	(Guinea)	MF	Ousmane Camara	1	0	0	0	1	0
20	(Norway)	FW	Benjamin Stokke	1	0	0	0	1	0
22	(Norway)	DF	Ivan Näsberg	3	0	0	0	3	0
23	(Norway)	MF	Felix Myhre	4	0	0	0	4	0
25	(Canada)	DF	Sam Adekugbe	3	1	0	0	3	1
26	(Morocco)	MF	Osame Sahraoui	1	0	0	0	1	0
Players who left Vålerenga during the season:
			TOTALS	46	3	0	0	46	3
