= Oskar Opsahl =

Norwegian footballer (born 2001)

Personal information
- Full name: Oskar Aron Opsahl
- Date of birth: 25 August 2001 (age 25)
- Place of birth: Norway
- Height: 1.78 m (5 ft 10 in)
- Position: Defender

Youth career
- Heming
- 2014–2017: Stabæk
- 2017–2019: Vålerenga

Senior career*
Years	Team	Apps	(Gls)
2019–2021	Vålerenga	1	(0)
2019	→ Skeid (loan)	0	(0)
2022–2024	Tromsø	2	(0)
2024	→ Egersund (loan)	3	(0)

International career^{‡}
2016	Norway U15	9	(0)
2017	Norway U16	11	(1)
2018	Norway U17	7	(0)
2019	Norway U18	2	(0)
2019	Norway U21	2	(0)
- * Club domestic league appearances and goals as of 12 June 2024 ‡ National team caps and goals as of 29 July 2020

Oskar Aron Opsahl (born 25 August 2001) is a Norwegian football defender. He last played for Tromsø.

== Career ==
=== Vålerenga ===
After playing for both Heming, and Stabæk at youth level, he transferred to Vålerenga in 2017.

In the summer of 2018, after already appearing several times for Vålerenga's second team, Opsahl signed his first professional contract with the club. Opsahl appeared in both of Vålerenga's UEFA Conference League games in 2021, coming in as a substitution in both games.

For the latter half of the 2019 season, Opsahl was loaned out to the 1. divisjon club Skeid. He returned to Vålerenga after the season, making no appearances for the first team.

=== Tromsø ===
In February 2022 Opsahl was sold from Vålerenga to fellow Eliteserien club Tromsø.

For the first half of the 2024 season, Opsahl was on loan at Egersund, making six appearances in total, three in the league, and three in the cup.

His contract with Tromsø ended after the 2024 season, and was not renewed.

== Personal life ==
He is the younger brother of fellow footballer and Brann player Sakarias Opsahl.

== Career statistics ==
As of 31 August 2024

Club	Season	League			National cup		Europe		Total	
Club	Season	Division	Apps	Goals	Apps	Goals	Apps	Goal	Apps	Goals
Vålerenga 2	2017	Norwegian Second Division	2	0	—				2	0
Vålerenga 2	2018	Norwegian Second Division	13	1	—				13	1
Vålerenga 2	2019	Norwegian Third Division	16	1	—				16	1
Vålerenga 2	2020	Norwegian Second Division	12	0	—				12	0
Vålerenga 2	2021	Norwegian Second Division	13	1	—				13	1
Vålerenga 2	Total		56	3	—				56	3
Skeid (loan)	2019	Norwegian First Division	0	0	0	0	—		0	0
Vålerenga	2019	Eliteserien	0	0	2	0	—		2	0
Vålerenga	2020	Eliteserien	1	0	—		—		1	0
Vålerenga	2021	Eliteserien	0	0	1	0	2 (Note: Appearances in UEFA Conference League)	0	3	0
Vålerenga	Total		1	0	3	0	2	0	6	0
Tromsø	2022	Eliteserien	2	0	0	0	—		2	0
Tromsø	2023	Eliteserien	0	0	0	0	—		0	0
Tromsø	2024	Eliteserien	0	0	0	0	—		0	0
Tromsø	Total		2	0	0	0	—		2	0
Egersund (loan)	2024	Norwegian First Division	3	0	3	0	—		6	0
Career total			62	3	6	0	2	0	70	3
