= Ousmane Camara (footballer, born 1998) =

Guinean footballer

Personal information
- Full name: Ousmane Camara
- Date of birth: 28 December 1998 (age 27)
- Place of birth: Conakry, Guinea
- Height: 1.67 m (5 ft 6 in)
- Position: Winger

Team information
- Current team: Guangdong GZ-Power
- Number: 7

Senior career*
Years	Team	Apps	(Gls)
2018–2019	AFC Eskilstuna	43	(6)
2019–2021	Vålerenga	10	(0)
2021	→ Dila Gori (loan)	36	(8)
2022	Dila Gori	0	(0)
2022–2024	Dinamo Tbilisi	71	(24)
2024–2026	Astana	49	(13)
2026–	Guangdong GZ-Power	29	(12)

International career^{‡}
2015	Guinea U17	2	(0)
2024–	Guinea	7	(2)
- * Club domestic league appearances and goals as of 7 November 2026 ‡ National team caps and goals as of 31 December 2025

Ousmane Camara (born 28 December 1998) is a Guinean professional footballer who plays as a winger for China League One club Guangdong GZ-Power and Guinea national team.

== Club career ==
On 13 January 2022, Dinamo Tbilisi announced the signing of Camara to a three-year contract from Dila Gori.

On 21 January 2024, Astana announced the singing of Camara to a three-year contract.

== Career statistics ==
=== Club ===
As of match played 7 November 2026

Appearances and goals by club, season and competition
Club	Season	League			National cup (Note: Includes Svenska Cupen, Norwegian Cup, Georgian Cup, Kazakhstan Cup)		League cup (Note: Includes Kazakhstan League Cup)		Continental		Other		Total	
Club	Season	Division	Apps	Goals	Apps	Goals	Apps	Goals	Apps	Goals	Apps	Goals	Apps	Goals
AFC Eskilstuna	2018	Superettan	28	4	1	0	—		—		2 (Note: Appearances in the Superettan Playoffs)	0	31	4
AFC Eskilstuna	2019	Allsvenskan	15	2	4	0	—		—		—		19	2
AFC Eskilstuna	Total		43	6	5	0	—		—		2	0	50	6
Vålerenga	2019	Eliteserien	6	0	0	0	—		—		—		0	0
Vålerenga	2020	Eliteserien	4	0	0	0	—		—		—		0	0
Vålerenga	2021	Eliteserien	0	0	0	0	—		0 (Note: Appearances in the UEFA Europa Conference League)	0	—		0	0
Vålerenga	Total		10	0	0	0	—		0	0	—		10	0
Dila Gori (loan)	2021	Erovnuli Liga	36	8	2	1	—		2	1	—		40	10
Dinamo Tbilisi	2022	Erovnuli Liga	36	10	4	1	—		2	0	—		42	11
Dinamo Tbilisi	2023	Erovnuli Liga	35	14	2	0	—		4 (Note: Two Appearances and one goal in the UEFA Champions League, and two appearances and zero goals in the UEFA Europa Conference League)	1	2 (Note: Appearances in the Georgian Super Cup)	0	43	15
Dinamo Tbilisi	Total		71	24	6	1	—		6	1	2	0	85	26
Astana	2024	Kazakhstan Premier League	23	4	2	0	5	1	10	1	—		40	6
Astana	2025	Kazakhstan Premier League	26	9	1	0	0	0	4	1	—		31	10
Astana	Total		49	13	3	0	5	1	14	2	—		71	16
Guangdong GZ-Power	2026	China League One	29	12	1	1	—		—		—		30	13
Career total			238	63	17	3	5	1	22	4	4	0	286	71

=== International ===
List of international goals scored by Ousmane Camara
No.	Date	Venue	Cap	Opponent	Score	Result	Competition
1	21 March 2024	King Abdullah Sports City, Jeddah, Saudi Arabia	1	Vanuatu	3–0	6–0	2024 FIFA Series
2	5 September 2025	Mandela National Stadium, Kampala, Uganda	3	Somalia	3–0	3–0	2026 FIFA World Cup qualification

== Honours ==
=== Club ===
Guangdong GZ-Power

- China League One: 2026
