= 2019 Vålerenga Fotball season =

Vålerenga
2019 season
- Chairman: Thomas Baardseng
- Manager: Ronny Deila
- Stadium: Intility Arena
- Eliteserien: 10th
- Norwegian Cup: Third Round vs Bærum
- Top goalscorer: League: Bård Finne (8); All: Bård Finne (11)
- Highest home attendance: 14,418 (25 May vs. Lillestrøm)
- Lowest home attendance: 5,037 (29 September vs. Ranheim)
- Average home league attendance: 7,834
| Home colours | Away colours |

During the 2019 campaign Vålerenga will have competed in the following competitions: Eliteserien, Norwegian Football Cup.

== Squad ==
As of 8 May 2019

Note: Flags indicate national team as defined under FIFA eligibility rules; some limited exceptions apply. Players may hold more than one non-FIFA nationality.

| No. | Pos. | Nation | Player |
|---|---|---|---|
| 1 | GK | NOR | Christian Kjetil Haug |
| 2 | DF | NOR | Markus Nakkim |
| 3 | DF | NOR | Johan Lædre Bjørdal |
| 4 | DF | NOR | Jonatan Tollås |
| 5 | DF | MEX | Efraín Juárez |
| 6 | MF | KOS | Herolind Shala |
| 7 | FW | CRC | Deyver Vega |
| 8 | MF | NOR | Magnus Lekven |
| 9 | FW | CRC | Mayron George (on loan from Midtjylland) |
| 10 | FW | ISL | Matthías Vilhjálmsson |
| 11 | FW | NOR | Bård Finne |
| 13 | GK | NOR | Kristoffer Klaesson |
| 14 | MF | GHA | Mohammed Abu |
| 15 | FW | NOR | Odin Thiago Holm |

| No. | Pos. | Nation | Player |
|---|---|---|---|
| 16 | MF | SWE | Erik Israelsson (on loan from PEC Zwolle) |
| 17 | DF | NOR | Leo Cornic |
| 18 | DF | NOR | Christian Dahle Borchgrevink |
| 21 | GK | GHA | Adam Larsen Kwarasey |
| 22 | DF | NOR | Ivan Näsberg |
| 23 | MF | NOR | Felix Horn Myhre |
| 25 | DF | CAN | Sam Adekugbe |
| 26 | MF | NOR | Aron Dønnum |
| 27 | DF | DEN | Pierre Kanstrup |
| 28 | FW | GUI | Ousmane Camara |
| 29 | MF | NOR | Mohammed Fellah |
| 31 | DF | NOR | Brage Skaret |
| 33 | DF | NOR | Amin Nouri |
| 36 | FW | NOR | Sander Haugaard Werni |

=== Out on loan ===
Note: Flags indicate national team as defined under FIFA eligibility rules; some limited exceptions apply. Players may hold more than one non-FIFA nationality.

| No. | Pos. | Nation | Player |
|---|---|---|---|
| 5 | DF | URU | Felipe Carvalho (on loan to Nacional) |
| 9 | FW | NOR | Fitim Azemi (on loan to Tromsø) |
| 19 | FW | NGR | Peter Godly Michael (on loan to Skeid) |

| No. | Pos. | Nation | Player |
|---|---|---|---|
| 20 | MF | NOR | Sakarias Opsahl (on loan to Ull/Kisa) |
| 24 | DF | NOR | Oskar Aron Opsahl (on loan to Skeid) |
| 27 | MF | ISL | Samúel Friðjónsson (on loan to Viking) |

== Transfers ==
=== Winter ===
In: Note: Flags indicate national team as defined under FIFA eligibility rules; some limited exceptions apply. Players may hold more than one non-FIFA nationality.

| No. | Pos. | Nation | Player |
|---|---|---|---|
| 2 | DF | NOR | Markus Nakkim (loan return from (Norway) Viking) |
| 6 | MF | KOS | Herolind Shala (from (Norway) Start) |
| 7 | MF | CRC | Deyver Vega (from (Norway) Brann) |
| 9 | FW | NOR | Fitim Azemi (loan return from (Norway) Sandefjord) |
| 10 | FW | ISL | Matthías Vilhjálmsson (from (Norway) Rosenborg) |

Out: Note: Flags indicate national team as defined under FIFA eligibility rules; some limited exceptions apply. Players may hold more than one non-FIFA nationality.

| No. | Pos. | Nation | Player |
|---|---|---|---|
| 7 | MF | NOR | Daniel Fredheim Holm (from (Norway) KFUM Oslo) |
| 18 | DF | NOR | Christian Borchgrevink (on loan to (Norway) Notodden, previously on loan to (Norway) HamKam) |
| 27 | MF | ISL | Samúel Friðjónsson (on loan to (Norway) Viking) |
| 29 | MF | NOR | Magnus Grødem (on loan to (Norway) Ull-Kisa) |
| 38 | DF | NOR | Kristoffer Hay (to (Norway) Aalesund, previously on loan to Tromsdalen) |

=== Summer ===
In: Note: Flags indicate national team as defined under FIFA eligibility rules; some limited exceptions apply. Players may hold more than one non-FIFA nationality.

| No. | Pos. | Nation | Player |
|---|---|---|---|
| 9 | FW | CRC | Mayron George (on loan from (Denmark) Midtjylland) |
| 18 | DF | NOR | Christian Borchgrevink (loan return from (Norway) Notodden) |
| 23 | MF | NOR | Felix Myhre (loan return from (Norway) Bodø/Glimt) |
| 27 | DF | DEN | Pierre Kanstrup (from (Turkey) Erzurumspor) |
| 28 | MF | DEN | Ousmane Camara (from (Sweden) AFC Eskilstuna) |
| 29 | MF | NOR | Magnus Grødem (loan return from (Norway) Ull-Kisa) |
| 29 | MF | NOR | Mohamed Fellah (free transfer) |

Out: Note: Flags indicate national team as defined under FIFA eligibility rules; some limited exceptions apply. Players may hold more than one non-FIFA nationality.

| No. | Pos. | Nation | Player |
|---|---|---|---|
| 9 | FW | NOR | Fitim Azemi (on loan to (Norway) Tromsø) |
| 19 | FW | NGR | Peter Godly Michael (on loan to (Norway) Skeid) |
| 29 | MF | NOR | Magnus Grødem (to (Denmark) Vejle) |
| 40 | FW | NGR | Chidera Ejuke (to (Netherlands) Heerenveen) |

== Friendlies ==
| 18 January 2019 Friendly | Sarpsborg 08 (Norway) | 4–0 | (Norway) Vålerenga | Lillestrøm |
| 12:45 CET (UTC+1) | | Report | | Stadium: LSK-Hallen |

| 25 January 2019 Friendly | Vålerenga (Norway) | 4–1 | (Norway) Strømmen | Lillestrøm |
| 12:15 CET (UTC+1) | | Report | | Stadium: LSK-Hallen |

| 29 January 2019 Friendly | Vålerenga (Norway) | 3–1 | (Norway) Ull/Kisa | Lillestrøm |
| 11:45 CET (UTC+1) | | Report | | Stadium: LSK-Hallen |

| 3 February 2019 Friendly | Vålerenga (Norway) | 0–2 | (Norway) Mjøndalen | Lillestrøm |
| 16:30 CET (UTC+1) | | Report | | Stadium: LSK-Hallen |

| 9 February 2019 Friendly | Vålerenga (Norway) | 1–2 | (Ukraine) Dynamo Kyiv | Marbella |
| 12:00 CET (UTC+1) | | Report | | Stadium: Estadio Municipal Antonio Lorenzo Cuevas |

| 12 February 2019 Friendly | Vålerenga (Norway) | 1–1 | (Russia) Rostov | Marbella |
| 17:00 CET (UTC+1) | | Report | | Stadium: Estadio Municipal Antonio Lorenzo Cuevas |

| 13 February 2019 Friendly | Vålerenga (Norway) | 2–1 | (Norway) Kongsvinger | Marbella |
| 15:30 CET (UTC+1) | | Report | | Stadium: Estadio Municipal Antonio Lorenzo Cuevas |

| 19 February 2019 Friendly | Vålerenga (Norway) | 3–0 | (Estonia) Nõmme Kalju | Marbella |
| 15:00 CET (UTC+1) | | Report | | Stadium: Estadio Municipal Antonio Lorenzo Cuevas |

| 1 March 2019 Friendly | Vålerenga (Norway) | 3–2 | (Norway) Bodø/Glimt | Oslo |
| 14:00 CET (UTC+1) | | Report | | Stadium: Intility Arena |

| 8 March 2019 Friendly | Vålerenga (Norway) | 2–0 | (Norway) Tromsø | Oslo |
| 15:00 CET (UTC+1) | | Report | | Stadium: Intility Arena |

| 15 March 2019 Friendly | Vålerenga (Norway) | 1–1 | (Norway) Strømsgodset | Oslo |
| 12:15 CET (UTC+1) | | Report | | Stadium: Intility Arena |

| 22 March 2019 Friendly | Vålerenga (Norway) | 4–4 | (Norway) Lillestrøm | Oslo |
| 17:15 CET (UTC+1) | | Report | | Stadium: Intility Arena |

== Competitions ==
=== Eliteserien ===
==== Results summary ====
| Overall | | | | | | | | Home | | | | | | Away | | | | | |
| Pld | W | D | L | GF | GA | GD | Pts | W | D | L | GF | GA | GD | W | D | L | GF | GA | GD |
|---|---|---|---|---|---|---|---|---|---|---|---|---|---|---|---|---|---|---|---|
| 30 | 8 | 10 | 12 | 39 | 44 | −5 | 34 | 6 | 4 | 5 | 23 | 20 | +3 | 2 | 6 | 7 | 16 | 24 | −8 |

Last updated: 1 December 2019.
Source: see below

==== Results by round ====
| Round | 1 | 2 | 3 | 4 | 5 | 6 | 7 | 8 | 9 | 10 | 11 | 12 | 13 | 14 | 15 | 16 | 17 | 18 | 19 | 20 | 21 | 22 | 23 | 24 | 25 | 26 | 27 | 28 | 29 | 30 |
|---|---|---|---|---|---|---|---|---|---|---|---|---|---|---|---|---|---|---|---|---|---|---|---|---|---|---|---|---|---|---|
| Ground | H | A | A | H | A | H | A | A | H | H | A | H | A | H | H | A | A | H | A | H | A | H | H | A | H | A | H | A | H | A |
| Result | W | L | L | W | D | W | D | W | W | L | L | D | W | W | D | L | D | L | L | D | L | L | D | D | L | D | W | D | L | L |
| Position | 1 | 7 | 4 | 6 | 2 | 4 | 3 | 2 | 3 | 4 | 5 | 5 | 4 | 4 | 4 | 4 | 6 | 6 | 6 | 7 | 8 | 9 | 9 | 9 | 9 | 9 | 9 | 10 | 10 | 10 |

Updated to match(es) played on 1 December 2019. Source: see below
A = Away; H = Home; W = Win; D = Draw; L = Loss

==== Results ====
| 30 March 2019 1 | Vålerenga | 2–0 | Mjøndalen | Oslo |
| 17:00 CEST (UTC+2) | Vilhjálmsson 19', 69'; Bjørdal (yellow card) 41'; Vega (yellow card) 80' | Report | Liseth (yellow card) 49' | Stadium: Intility Arena; Attendance: 8,055; Referee: Kristoffer Hagenes |

| 7 April 2019 2 | Kristiansund | 2–0 | Vålerenga | Kristiansund |
| 18:00 CEST (UTC+2) | Bye 45'; Diop (yellow card) 52'; Hoven 85' | Report | Juárez (yellow card) 31' (yellow-red card) 48'; Ejuke (yellow card) 76' | Stadium: Kristiansund Stadion; Attendance: 3,984; Referee: Dag Vidar Hafsås |

| 10 April 2019 15 | Molde | 4–1 | Vålerenga | Molde |
| 18:30 CEST (UTC+2) | Omoijuanfo 6'; E.Hestad (yellow card) 14'; Bjørnbak (yellow card) 35'; Eikrem 50' (yellow card) 75'; Andersen 53' (pen.); Linde (yellow card) 62'; Ellingsen 81' | Report | Bjørdal (yellow card) 35'; Adekugbe (yellow card) 52'; Nakkim 60' | Stadium: Aker Stadion; Attendance: 6,202; Referee: Rohit Saggi |
Note: The away match against Molde was scheduled for 14 July 2019, but was moved to 10 April 2019 due to Molde's preparation for the Europa League.

| 14 April 2019 3 | Vålerenga | 4–1 | Tromsø | Oslo |
| 20:00 CEST (UTC+2) | Finne 13'; Adekugbe (yellow card) 22'; Wangberg 30' (o.g.); Ejuke 60'; Shala 75' | Report | Bjørdal 71' (o.g.) | Stadium: Intility Arena; Attendance: 5,719; Referee: Svein Oddvar Moen |

| 22 April 2019 4 | Brann | 1–1 | Vålerenga | Bergen |
| 20:00 CEST (UTC+2) | Barmen 22'; Berisha (yellow card) 37' | Report | Shala 38'; Tollås (yellow card) 90+4' | Stadium: Brann Stadion; Attendance: 10,889; Referee: Tore Hansen |

| 29 April 2019 5 | Vålerenga | 1–0 | Odd | Oslo |
| 19:00 CEST (UTC+2) | Shala (yellow card) 56'; Dønnum 90+3' (yellow card) 90+3' | Report | Risa (yellow card) 90+2' | Stadium: Intility Arena; Attendance: 6,766; Referee: Sigurd Kringstad |

| 6 May 2019 6 | Viking | 1–1 | Vålerenga | Stavanger |
| 19:00 CEST (UTC+2) | Høiland 71' | Report | Ejuke 69' | Stadium: Viking Stadion; Attendance: 7,659; Referee: Tommy Skjerven |

| 12 May 2019 7 | Ranheim | 1–5 | Vålerenga | Trondheim |
| 18:00 CEST (UTC+2) | Furu (yellow card) 28'; Karlsen 58' (pen.); Alseth (yellow card) 77'; Reginiussen (yellow card) 84' | Report | Vilhjálmsson 53'; Vega 54', 64'; Ejuke 73', 90'; Näsberg (yellow card) 90+2' | Stadium: EXTRA Arena; Attendance: 1,950; Referee: Kristoffer Hagenes |

| 16 May 2019 8 | Vålerenga | 2–0 | Strømsgodset | Oslo |
| 20:00 CEST (UTC+2) | Dønnum 25'; Shala 67' | Report | Sylla (yellow card) 34'; Spelmann (yellow card) 85' | Stadium: Intility Arena; Attendance: 10,780; Referee: Tom Harald Hagen |

| 25 May 2019 10 | Vålerenga | 0–3 | Lillestrøm | Oslo |
| 18:00 CEST (UTC+2) | Ejuke (yellow card) 30'; Azemi (yellow card) 49' (yellow-red card) 79'; Juárez (yellow card) 61' | Report | Pedersen (yellow card) 12'; Olsen 15', 62'; Salquist 69' | Stadium: Intility Arena; Attendance: 14,418; Referee: Svein Oddvar Moen |

| 16 June 2019 11 | Rosenborg | 3–0 | Vålerenga | Trondheim |
| 20:00 CEST (UTC+2) | Adegbenro 14'; Reginiussen (yellow card) 36' de Lanlay 66'; Søderlund 86' | Report | Bjørdal (yellow card) 57'; Abu (yellow card) 86' | Stadium: Lerkendal Stadion; Attendance: 13,320; Referee: Rohit Saggi |

| 23 June 2019 12 | Vålerenga | 1–1 | Sarpsborg 08 | Oslo |
| 15:00 CEST (UTC+2) | Finne 34'; Adekugbe (yellow card) 88' | Report | Salvesen 19'; Thomassen (yellow card) 73' | Stadium: Intility Arena; Attendance: 8,130; Referee: Kai Erik Steen |

| 30 June 2019 13 | Haugesund | 1–4 | Vålerenga | Haugesund |
| 18:00 CEST (UTC+2) | Koné 77' | Report | Finne 14', 41'; Dønnum 39' (yellow card) 76'; Juárez (yellow card) 41'; Ejuke 61'; Borchgrevink (yellow card) 79'; Shala (yellow card) 87' | Stadium: Haugesund Stadion; Attendance: 3,817; Referee: Kristoffer Hagenes |

| 5 July 2019 14 | Vålerenga | 6–0 | Bodø/Glimt | Oslo |
| 19:00 CEST (UTC+2) | Dønnum 7', 17'; Finne 25'; Vilhjalmsson 29' (pen.); Shala 84'; Ejuke 90+3' | Report | | Stadium: Intility Arena; Attendance: 8,836; Referee: Sigurd Smehus Kringstad |

| 4 August 2019 16 | Vålerenga | 1–1 | Kristiansund | Oslo |
| 20:00 CEST (UTC+2) | Lekven (yellow card) 15'; Juárez (yellow card) 51'; Vilhjálmsson 76' | Report | Sørmo (yellow card) 6' (goal) 8'; Cirak (yellow card) 70' | Stadium: Intility Arena; Attendance: 6,248; Referee: Tore Hansen |

| 11 August 2019 17 | Strømsgodset | 3–2 | Vålerenga | Drammen |
| 20:00 CEST (UTC+2) | Vilsvik 39'; Keita 49', 62'; Tchamba (yellow card) 83' | Report | Dønnum 51'; Bjørdal 71' | Stadium: Marienlyst Stadion; Attendance: 5,318; Referee: Tommy Skjerven |

| 14 August 2019 9 | Stabæk | 1–1 | Vålerenga | Bærum |
| 19:00 CEST (UTC+2) | Hanche-Olsen (yellow card) 38' (goal) 65'; Demidov (yellow card) 74'; Hernández (yellow card) 81' | Report | Dønnum (yellow card) 41'; George 48'; Bjørdal (yellow card) 57'; Borchgrevink (yellow card) 72'; Finne (yellow card) 82'; Vega (yellow card) 90+4' | Stadium: Nadderud Stadion; Attendance: 4,621; Referee: Kai Erik Steen |

| 18 August 2019 18 | Vålerenga | 1–2 | Haugesund | Oslo |
| 18:00 CEST (UTC+2) | Shala 2' (yellow card) 35'; Bjørdal (yellow card) 53'; Näsberg (yellow card) 84' | Report | Krygård (yellow card) 34'; Sandberg 48'; Tronstad (yellow card) 55'; Velde 64' | Stadium: Intility Arena; Attendance: 7,304; Referee: Dag Vidar Hafsås |

| 26 August 2019 19 | Bodø/Glimt | 4–0 | Vålerenga | Bodø |
| 19:00 CEST (UTC+2) | Saltnes 10'; Evjen 55'; Dønnum 58' (o.g.); Sveen 70' | Report | Israelsson (yellow card) 90' | Stadium: Aspmyra Stadion; Attendance: 3,860; Referee: Kristoffer Hagenes |

| 1 September 2019 20 | Vålerenga | 1–1 | Rosenborg | Oslo |
| 20:00 CEST (UTC+2) | Borchgrevink 60'; Vega (yellow card) 88' | Report | Jensen (red card) 38'; Adegbenro (yellow card) 47'; Hedenstad 54' (yellow card) 77'; Konradsen (yellow card) 90' | Stadium: Intility Arena; Attendance: 11,101; Referee: Rohit Saggi |

| 16 September 2019 21 | Sarpsborg 08 | 1–0 | Vålerenga | Sarpsborg |
| 19:00 CEST (UTC+2) | Lindseth 44'; Zachariassen (yellow card) 90+4'; Askar (yellow card) 90+5' | Report | Vega (yellow card) 90+3' | Stadium: Sarpsborg Stadion; Attendance: 5,454; Referee: Tom Harald Hagen |

| 22 September 2019 22 | Vålerenga | 0–4 | Viking | Oslo |
| 18:00 CEST (UTC+2) | | Report | Østensen 5', 23'; Pereira 75'; Källman 79' | Stadium: Intility Arena; Attendance: 7,056; Referee: Kristoffer Hagenes |

| 29 September 2019 23 | Vålerenga | 1–1 | Ranheim | Oslo |
| 18:00 CEST (UTC+2) | Finne 62' | Report | Erlien 86' | Stadium: Intility Arena; Attendance: 5,037; Referee: Tore Hansen |

| 5 October 2019 24 | Odd | 1–1 | Vålerenga | Skien |
| 18:00 CEST (UTC+2) | Kaasa (yellow card) 26'; Risa 90+3' | Report | Lekven (yellow card) 12'; Finne 56'; Borchgrevink (yellow card) 81' | Stadium: Skagerak Arena; Attendance: 5,362; Referee: Kristoffer Hagenes |

| 19 October 2019 25 | Vålerenga | 0–2 | Stabæk | Oslo |
| 20:30 CEST (UTC+2) | Dønnum (yellow card) 57' (yellow-red card) 74' | Report | Skytte 6'; Kassi 17' | Stadium: Intility Arena; Attendance: 5,511; Referee: Tom Harald Hagen |

| 26 October 2019 26 | Lillestrøm | 0–0 | Vålerenga | Lillestrøm |
| 16:00 CEST (UTC+2) | | Report | Borchgrevink (yellow card) 74' | Stadium: Åråsen Stadion; Attendance: 9,884; Referee: Tommy Skjerven |

| 3 November 2019 27 | Vålerenga | 1–0 | Brann | Oslo |
| 20:00 CET (UTC+1) | Shala 45+4'; Lekven (yellow card) 90+5' | Report | Jenssen (yellow card) 8'; Barmen (yellow card) 29'; Acosta (yellow card) 67'; Koomson (yellow card) 90+5' | Stadium: Intility Arena; Attendance: 5,889; Referee: Tore Hansen |

| 10 November 2019 28 | Tromsø | 0–0 | Vålerenga | Tromsø |
| 18:00 CET (UTC+1) | Jenssen (yellow card) 60' | Report | | Stadium: Alfheim Stadion; Attendance: 2,575; Referee: Dag Vidar Hafsås |

| 24 November 2019 29 | Vålerenga | 2–4 | Molde | Oslo |
| 18:00 CET (UTC+1) | Finne 11'; George 56' | Report | E.Hestad 23'; Omoijuanfo (yellow card) 24'; Bolly 31'; Hussain (yellow card) 55' (goal) 81'; Christensen 58'; Eikrem (yellow card) 90' | Stadium: Intility Arena; Attendance: 6,666; Referee: Rohit Saggi |

| 1 December 2019 30 | Mjøndalen | 1–0 | Vålerenga | Mjøndalen |
| 18:00 CET (UTC+1) | Brustad 53'; Liseth (yellow card) 82' | Report | Adekugbe (yellow card) 23' | Stadium: Consto Arena; Attendance: 2,321; Referee: Kai Erik Steen |

==== Table ====
| Pos | Team | Pld | W | D | L | GF | GA | GD | Pts |
|---|---|---|---|---|---|---|---|---|---|
| 8 | Stabæk | 30 | 10 | 10 | 10 | 38 | 36 | +2 | 40 |
| 9 | Brann | 30 | 10 | 10 | 10 | 32 | 37 | −5 | 40 |
| 10 | Vålerenga | 30 | 8 | 10 | 12 | 39 | 44 | −5 | 34 |
| 11 | Strømsgodset | 30 | 8 | 8 | 14 | 41 | 54 | −13 | 32 |
| 12 | Sarpsborg 08 | 30 | 5 | 15 | 10 | 30 | 40 | −10 | 30 |

Source: Football Association of Norway (in Norwegian), Soccerway
Rules for classification: 1) Points; 2) Goal difference; 3) Goals scored; 4) Head-to-head points; 5) Head-to-head goal difference; 6) Head-to-head away goals scored (only if between two teams); 7) Head-to-head goals scored; 8) Play-off (only used to decide champions or relegation).

=== Norwegian Cup ===
| 2 May 2019 First Round | Faaberg | 0–3 | Vålerenga | Fåberg |
| 18:00 CEST (UTC+2) | S.Jørgensen (yellow card) 10' | Report | Azemi 18', 59'; Vega 70'; O.Opsahl (yellow card) 77' | Stadium: Jorekstad Hovedbanen; Attendance: 956; Referee: Anders Bodding |

| 22 May 2019 Second Round | Eidsvold | 0–5 | Vålerenga | Eidsvoll |
| 19:00 CEST (UTC+2) | | Report | Vilhjálmsson 11', 61'; Myhre (yellow card) 34'; Finne 55', 65', 78' | Stadium: Myhrer Stadion; Attendance: 1,590; Referee: Shervin Heydary |

| 19 June 2019 Third Round | Bærum | 5–3 | Vålerenga | Sandvika |
| 18:00 CEST (UTC+2) | J.Aubert 41' (pen.) (yellow card) 63'; C.Ifejillika 52'; M.Berg 56'; A.Kidane 61'; A.Rogulj 80'; J.Nilsen (yellow card) 88' | Report | Dønnum 8'; Ejuke 35'; Vilhjálmsson 73'; Näsberg (yellow card) 82' | Stadium: Sandvika Stadion; Attendance: 683; Referee: Christian Moen |

== Squad statistics ==
As of match played 1 December 2019

=== Appearances and goals ===
| No. | Pos | Nat | Player | Total | | Eliteserien | | Norwegian Cup | |
| No. | Pos | Nat | Player | Apps | Goals | Apps | Goals | Apps | Goals |
|---|---|---|---|---|---|---|---|---|---|
| 1 | GK | (Norway) NOR | Christian Kjetil Haug | 2 | 0 | 0 | 0 | 2 | 0 |
| 2 | DF | (Norway) NOR | Markus Nakkim | 9 | 1 | 3+4 | 1 | 2 | 0 |
| 3 | DF | (Norway) NOR | Johan Lædre Bjørdal | 28 | 1 | 25+2 | 1 | 1 | 0 |
| 4 | DF | (Norway) NOR | Jonatan Tollås | 12 | 0 | 10 | 0 | 2 | 0 |
| 5 | DF | (Mexico) MEX | Efraín Juárez | 21 | 0 | 19 | 0 | 1+1 | 0 |
| 6 | MF | (Kosovo) KOS | Herolind Shala | 22 | 6 | 18+3 | 6 | 1 | 0 |
| 7 | FW | (Costa Rica) CRC | Deyver Vega | 24 | 3 | 11+12 | 2 | 1 | 1 |
| 8 | MF | (Norway) NOR | Magnus Lekven | 31 | 0 | 30 | 0 | 0+1 | 0 |
| 9 | FW | (Costa Rica) CRC | Mayron George | 10 | 2 | 7+3 | 2 | 0 | 0 |
| 10 | FW | (Iceland) ISL | Matthías Vilhjálmsson | 30 | 8 | 27+1 | 5 | 1+1 | 3 |
| 11 | FW | (Norway) NOR | Bård Finne | 32 | 11 | 21+8 | 8 | 2+1 | 3 |
| 13 | GK | (Norway) NOR | Kristoffer Klaesson | 12 | 0 | 12 | 0 | 0 | 0 |
| 14 | MF | (Ghana) GHA | Mohammed Abu | 26 | 0 | 21+3 | 0 | 2 | 0 |
| 15 | FW | (Norway) NOR | Odin Holm | 1 | 0 | 0+1 | 0 | 0 | 0 |
| 16 | MF | (Sweden) SWE | Erik Israelsson | 8 | 0 | 0+6 | 0 | 1+1 | 0 |
| 17 | DF | (Norway) NOR | Leo Cornic | 1 | 0 | 0 | 0 | 1 | 0 |
| 18 | DF | (Norway) NOR | Christian Borchgrevink | 13 | 1 | 7+5 | 1 | 1 | 0 |
| 21 | GK | (Ghana) GHA | Adam Larsen Kwarasey | 19 | 0 | 18 | 0 | 1 | 0 |
| 22 | DF | (Norway) NOR | Ivan Näsberg | 23 | 0 | 22 | 0 | 1 | 0 |
| 23 | MF | (Norway) NOR | Felix Myhre | 19 | 0 | 5+12 | 0 | 2 | 0 |
| 25 | DF | (Canada) CAN | Sam Adekugbe | 25 | 0 | 20+4 | 0 | 1 | 0 |
| 26 | MF | (Norway) NOR | Aron Dønnum | 28 | 7 | 20+5 | 6 | 3 | 1 |
| 27 | DF | (Denmark) DEN | Pierre Kanstrup | 11 | 0 | 11 | 0 | 0 | 0 |
| 28 | FW | (Guinea) GUI | Ousmane Camara | 6 | 0 | 2+4 | 0 | 0 | 0 |
| 29 | MF | (Norway) NOR | Mohammed Fellah | 6 | 0 | 0+6 | 0 | 0 | 0 |
| 33 | DF | (Norway) NOR | Amin Nouri | 4 | 0 | 3+1 | 0 | 0 | 0 |
| 36 | FW | (Norway) NOR | Sander Haugaard Werni | 1 | 0 | 0 | 0 | 0+1 | 0 |
Players away from Vålerenga on loan:
| 9 | FW | (Norway) NOR | Fitim Azemi | 13 | 2 | 4+7 | 0 | 2 | 2 |
| 20 | MF | (Norway) NOR | Sakarias Opsahl | 3 | 0 | 0+1 | 0 | 1+1 | 0 |
| 24 | DF | (Norway) NOR | Oskar Opsahl | 2 | 0 | 0 | 0 | 2 | 0 |
Players who left Vålerenga during the season:
| 29 | MF | (Norway) NOR | Magnus Grødem | 2 | 0 | 0+1 | 0 | 0+1 | 0 |
| 40 | FW | (Nigeria) NGR | Chidera Ejuke | 16 | 7 | 14 | 6 | 2 | 1 |

=== Goal scorers ===
| Place | Position | Nation | Number | Name | Eliteserien | Norwegian Cup | Total |
|---|---|---|---|---|---|---|---|
| 1 | FW | (Norway) | 11 | Bård Finne | 8 | 3 | 11 |
| 1 | FW | (Iceland) | 10 | Matthías Vilhjálmsson | 5 | 3 | 8 |
| 3 | FW | (Nigeria) | 40 | Chidera Ejuke | 6 | 1 | 7 |
| 3 | MF | (Norway) | 26 | Aron Dønnum | 6 | 1 | 7 |
| 5 | MF | (Kosovo) | 6 | Herolind Shala | 6 | 0 | 6 |
| 6 | FW | (Costa Rica) | 7 | Deyver Vega | 2 | 1 | 3 |
| 7 | FW | (Costa Rica) | 9 | Mayron George | 2 | 0 | 2 |
| 7 | FW | (Norway) | 9 | Fitim Azemi | 0 | 2 | 2 |
| 9 | DF | (Norway) | 2 | Markus Nakkim | 1 | 0 | 1 |
| 9 | DF | (Norway) | 3 | Johan Bjørdal | 1 | 0 | 1 |
| 9 | MF | (Norway) | 18 | Christian Borchgrevink | 1 | 0 | 1 |
| 9 | | | | Own goal | 1 | 0 | 1 |
| | | | | TOTALS | 39 | 11 | 50 |

=== Disciplinary record ===
| Number | Nation | Position | Name | Eliteserien | | Norwegian Cup | | Total | |
| Number | Nation | Position | Name | Yellow card | Red card | Yellow card | Red card | Yellow card | Red card |
| 3 | (Norway) | DF | Johan Bjørdal | 5 | 0 | 0 | 0 | 5 | 0 |
| 4 | (Norway) | DF | Jonatan Tollås | 1 | 0 | 0 | 0 | 1 | 0 |
| 5 | (Mexico) | DF | Efraín Juárez | 5 | 1 | 0 | 0 | 5 | 1 |
| 6 | (Kosovo) | MF | Herolind Shala | 3 | 0 | 0 | 0 | 3 | 0 |
| 7 | (Costa Rica) | FW | Deyver Vega | 4 | 0 | 0 | 0 | 4 | 0 |
| 8 | (Norway) | MF | Magnus Lekven | 3 | 0 | 0 | 0 | 3 | 0 |
| 11 | (Norway) | FW | Bård Finne | 1 | 0 | 0 | 0 | 1 | 0 |
| 14 | (Ghana) | MF | Mohammed Abu | 1 | 0 | 0 | 0 | 1 | 0 |
| 16 | (Sweden) | MF | Erik Israelsson | 1 | 0 | 0 | 0 | 1 | 0 |
| 18 | (Norway) | DF | Christian Borchgrevink | 4 | 0 | 0 | 0 | 4 | 0 |
| 22 | (Norway) | DF | Ivan Näsberg | 2 | 0 | 1 | 0 | 3 | 0 |
| 23 | (Norway) | MF | Felix Myhre | 0 | 0 | 1 | 0 | 1 | 0 |
| 25 | (Canada) | DF | Sam Adekugbe | 4 | 0 | 0 | 0 | 4 | 0 |
| 26 | (Norway) | MF | Aron Dønnum | 5 | 1 | 0 | 0 | 5 | 1 |
Players away on loan:
| 9 | (Norway) | FW | Fitim Azemi | 1 | 0 | 0 | 0 | 1 | 0 |
| 24 | (Norway) | DF | Oskar Aron Opsahl | 0 | 0 | 1 | 0 | 1 | 0 |
Players who left Vålerenga during the season:
| 40 | (Nigeria) | FW | Chidera Ejuke | 2 | 0 | 0 | 0 | 2 | 0 |
| | | | TOTALS | 42 | 2 | 3 | 0 | 45 | 2 |
