= Fredrik Holmé =

Norwegian footballer (born 2001)

Personal information
- Date of birth: 23 July 2001 (age 25)
- Place of birth: Oslo, Norway
- Height: 1.90 m (6 ft 3 in)
- Position: Defender

Team information
- Current team: Fredrikstad
- Number: 4

Youth career
- –2016: Skeid
- 2017–2019: Vålerenga

Senior career*
Years	Team	Apps	(Gls)
2018–2021	Vålerenga 2	38	(6)
2020–2021	Vålerenga	1	(0)
2020	→ Ull/Kisa (loan)	7	(0)
2022–2026	Kongsvinger	110	(1)
2026–	Fredrikstad	11	(1)
- * Club domestic league appearances and goals as of 23 July 2026

Fredrik Holmé (born 23 July 2001) is a Norwegian footballer who plays as a central defender for Fredrikstad.

== Career ==
Born in Oslo, and growing up in Veitvet, Holmé played youth football for Skeid before transferring to the academy of Vålerenga in 2017.

In June 2020, Holmé was drafted into Vålerenga's senior squad ahead of the delayed start of the 2020 Eliteserien. He did not reach the first team, and was loaned out to Ull/Kisa in October to play the remainder of the 2020 1. divisjon campaign. In July 2021, he made his Vålerenga debut in the cup match against Lyn, and then his Eliteserien debut against Sandefjord in September. Still not near the first team, Vålerenga chose to sell Holmé to Kongsvinger. For Kongsvinger, he made his debut in a cup game against Viking, held in March 2022.

Holmé became gradually more noticed in 2023. In July 2023, he was named Young Player of the Month in the 1. divisjon. He also extended his contract with Kongsvinger until the end of 2026, and bought his first apartment in Kongsvinger.

According to Telemark Arbeiderblad, Odd watched Holmé as a replacement for Odin Bjørtuft, and Sarpsborg Arbeiderblad mentioned him as a replacement for Bjørn Inge Utvik in Sarpsborg 08. Ahead of the 2024 season, Kongsvinger rejected a "several million" bid from Haugesund, as well as "several bids" from Fredrikstad.

== Career statistics ==
As of 27 January 2027

Appearances and goals by club, season and competition
Club	Season	League			National Cup		Other		Total	
Club	Season	Division	Apps	Goals	Apps	Goals	Apps	Goals	Apps	Goals
Vålerenga 2	2018	2. divisjon	3	0	—		—		3	0
Vålerenga 2	2019	3. divisjon	9	1	—		—		9	1
Vålerenga 2	2020	2. divisjon	12	2	—		—		12	2
Vålerenga 2	2021	2. divisjon	14	3	—		—		14	3
Vålerenga 2	Total		38	6	—		—		38	6
Vålerenga	2020	Eliteserien	0	0	—		—		0	0
Vålerenga	2021	Eliteserien	1	0	2	0	—		3	0
Vålerenga	Total		1	0	2	0	—		3	0
Ull/Kisa (loan)	2020	1. divisjon	7	0	—		—		7	0
Kongsvinger	2022	1. divisjon	29	0	2	0	4	0	35	0
Kongsvinger	2023	1. divisjon	30	1	1	0	1	0	32	1
Kongsvinger	2024	1. divisjon	25	0	1	0	2	0	28	0
Kongsvinger	2025	1. divisjon	26	0	4	1	1	0	31	1
Kongsvinger	Total		110	1	8	1	8	0	126	2
Fredrikstad	2026	Eliteserien	0	0	—		—		0	0
Career total			156	7	10	1	8	0	174	8

== Honours ==
Individual

- Norwegian First Division Young Player of the Month: June 2023
