= Viðar Örn Kjartansson =

Icelandic footballer (born 1990)

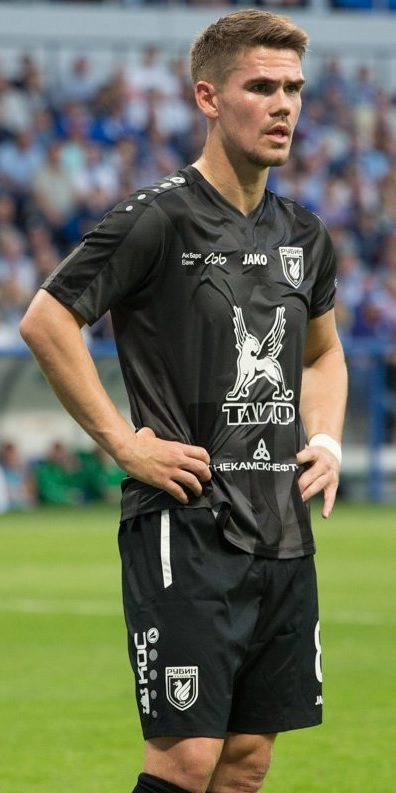
- Viðar with Rubin Kazan in 2019

Personal information
- Date of birth: 11 March 1990 (age 36)
- Place of birth: Selfoss, Iceland
- Height: 1.87 m (6 ft 2 in)
- Position: Striker

Team information
- Current team: Selfoss
- Number: 9

Youth career
- –2006: Selfoss

Senior career*
Years	Team	Apps	(Gls)
2006–2008	Selfoss	45	(12)
2009	ÍBV	17	(2)
2010–2012	Selfoss	55	(26)
2013	Fylkir	22	(13)
2014	Vålerenga	29	(25)
2015	Jiangsu Sainty	28	(9)
2016	Malmö FF	20	(14)
2016–2018	Maccabi Tel Aviv	63	(32)
2018–2020	Rostov	8	(0)
2019	→ Hammarby (loan)	15	(7)
2019	→ Rubin Kazan (loan)	16	(1)
2020	→ Yeni Malatyaspor (loan)	15	(2)
2020–2022	Vålerenga	42	(18)
2022–2023	Atromitos	31	(6)
2023–2024	CSKA 1948	11	(1)
2024–2026	KA Akureyri	37	(6)
2026–	Selfoss	20	(21)

International career^{‡}
2006–2007	Iceland U17	8	(4)
2008	Iceland U19	2	(0)
2014–	Iceland	32	(4)
- * Club domestic league appearances and goals as of 2 November 2025 ‡ National team caps and goals as of 1 August 2022

Viðar Örn Kjartansson (Icelandic pronunciation: [ˈvɪːðar œrtn̥ ˈcʰar̥tansɔn]; born 11 March 1990) is an Icelandic professional footballer who plays as a striker for 2. deild karla club Selfoss.

== Club career ==
Viðar made his debut for Selfoss in 2006, aged 16. He joined Icelandic top division club ÍBV in 2009 but rejoined Selfoss after a short stint with ÍBV.

He joined Icelandic club Fylkir in 2013 and after a very prolific goalscoring season in the Icelandic top flight, he joined Norwegian club Vålerenga in December 2013. Viðar scored his first goal for Vålerenga in a 3–1 home win over Bodø/Glimt on 6. April 2014.

After his first year in Norway, Viðar ended up as the top scorer in the Norwegian top league with 25 goals scored in 29 games.

On 22 January 2015, Viðar transferred to Chinese Super League side Jiangsu Guoxin-Sainty. Jiangsu Guoxin-Sainty signed him for €3.5 million. On 7 March 2015, he made his debut and scored his first goal for Jiangsu in the first league match of the 2015 season which Jiangsu Sainty lost to Shanghai SIPG 2–1.

Viðar played a vital part in the Chinese FA cup, and was the club's top goalscorer in the cup with four goals, which helped Jiangsu to win their first trophy in history of the club.

On 27 January 2016, he signed for Swedish club Malmö FF.

On 30 August 2016, he transferred to Israeli club Maccabi Tel Aviv. He has won the 2017–18 Toto Cup with the team.

He signed a four-year deal with the club. On 26 October 2016, Kjartansson won the Swedish championship as Malmö FF sealed the title in his absence.

On 31 August 2018, he signed a four-year contract with the Russian Premier League club FC Rostov, joining his compatriots Ragnar Sigurðsson, Björn Bergmann Sigurðarson and Sverrir Ingi Ingason at the club. He scored his first two goals for the club on 26 September 2018 in a Russian Cup 4–0 victory over a third-tier club FC Syzran-2003.

On 18 March 2019, Viðar signed a five-month loan deal with Hammarby IF in Allsvenskan.

On 20 July 2019, he joined Russian club FC Rubin Kazan on loan for the 2019–20 season. He played 16 league games and scored one goal during the first half of the season, as Rubin Kazan was placed 13th in the table, before terminating his loan deal on 11 January 2020. On 27 January 2020, Rostov announced that he was loaned to Turkish club Yeni Malatyaspor.

On 28 August 2020, he returned to Vålerenga and signed a contract until 2023.

On 1 August 2022, he joined Atromitos on a two-year deal. He scored in his debut against OFI, helping to a 3–1 home win in the season's opener.

== International career ==
Viðar made his senior international debut for Iceland in 2014, starting as a centre forward in a friendly against Austria. He scored his first international goal in a friendly against the United Arab Emirates in January 2016. Despite a strong run for his club team Malmö FF, Viðar was overlooked for a spot in Iceland's Euro 2016 squad and instead put on the team's standby list. His second international goal came in a friendly against Qatar in November 2017. Viðar once again missed out on playing in an international championship, when he was left out of Iceland's World Cup 2018 squad, serving as a non-squad reserve.

Viðar announced his retirement from international duty in October 2018 at the age of 28, having won 19 caps and scored two goals.

In March 2019, Viðar reversed his decision to retire from the national team and was called up to represent Iceland in the UEFA Euro 2020 qualifying games against Andorra and France.

== Career statistics ==
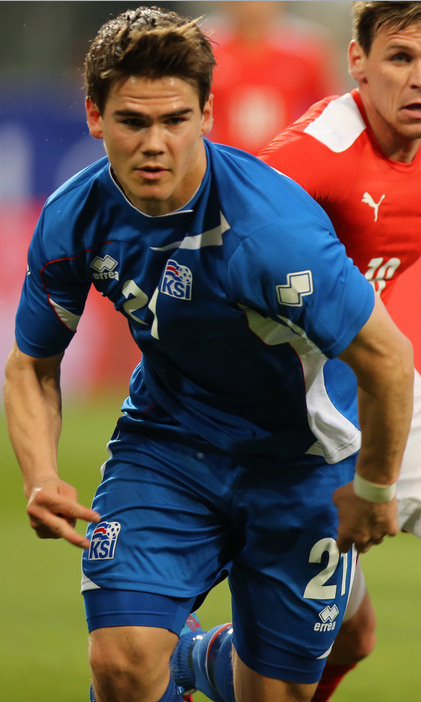
Viðar playing for Iceland in 2014

=== Club ===
As of match played 2 April 2023

Appearances and goals by club, season and competition
Club	Season	League			National cup (Note: Includes Icelandic Cup, Norwegian Football Cup, Chinese FA Cup, Svenska Cupen, Israel State Cup, Russian Cup, Greek Football Cup)		League cup (Note: Includes Icelandic League Cup, Toto Cup)		Continental		Total	
Club	Season	Division	Apps	Goals	Apps	Goals	Apps	Goals	Apps	Goals	Apps	Goals
Selfoss	2006	2. deild	7	2	—		4	2	—		11	4
Selfoss	2007	2. deild	16	2	2	0	5	2	—		23	4
Selfoss	2008	1. deild	22	8	1	2	5	1	—		28	11
Selfoss	Total		45	12	3	2	14	5	—		62	19
ÍBV	2009	Úrvalsdeild	17	2	2	1	5	3	—		24	6
Selfoss	2010	Úrvalsdeild	12	3	—		—		—		12	3
Selfoss	2011	1. deild	22	16	2	1	7	4	—		31	21
Selfoss	2012	Úrvalsdeild	21	7	3	1	3	3	—		27	11
Selfoss	Total		55	26	5	2	10	7	—		70	35
Fylkir	2013	Úrvalsdeild	22	13	3	5	5	5	—		30	23
Vålerenga	2014	Tippeligaen	29	25	4	6	—		—		33	31
Jiangsu Sainty	2015	Chinese Super League	28	9	7	4	—		—		35	13
Malmö FF	2016	Allsvenskan	20	14	6	3	—		—		26	17
Maccabi Tel Aviv	2016–17	Israeli Premier League	33	19	4	4	2	0	5 (Note: Appearances in UEFA Europa League)	1	44	24
Maccabi Tel Aviv	2017–18	Israeli Premier League	30	13	0	0	3	4	9	4	42	21
Maccabi Tel Aviv	Total		63	32	4	4	5	4	14	5	86	45
Rostov	2018–19	Russian Premier League	8	0	3	2	—		—		11	2
Hammarby (loan)	2019	Allsvenskan	15	7	0	0	—		—		15	7
Rubin Kazan (loan)	2019–20	Russian Premier League	16	1	1	0	—		—		17	1
Yeni Malatyaspor (loan)	2019–20	Süper Lig	15	2	—		—		—		15	2
Vålerenga	2020	Eliteserien	14	9	0	0	—		—		14	9
Vålerenga	2021	Eliteserien	18	5	1	0	—		—		19	5
Vålerenga	2022	Eliteserien	10	4	1	0	—		—		11	4
Vålerenga	Total		42	18	2	0	—		—		44	18
Atromitos	2022–23	Super League Greece	28	6	3	2	—		—		31	8
Career total			403	167	43	31	39	24	14	5	499	227

=== International ===
Scores and results list Iceland's goal tally first, score column indicates score after each Viðar goal.

List of international goals scored by Viðar Örn Kjartansson
No.	Date	Venue	Opponent	Score	Result	Competition
1	16 January 2016	Mohammed Bin Zayed Stadium, Abu Dhabi, United Arab Emirates	United Arab Emirates	1–0	1–2	Friendly
2	14 November 2017	Abdullah bin Khalifa Stadium, Doha, Qatar	Qatar	1–0	1–1	Friendly
3.	22 March 2019	Estadi Nacional, Andorra la Vella, Andorra	Andorra	2–0	2–0	UEFA Euro 2020 qualification
4	15 November 2020	Parken Stadium, Copenhagen, Denmark	Denmark	1–1	1–2	2020–21 UEFA Nations League A

== Honours ==
Jiangsu Sainty

- Chinese FA Cup: 2015

Malmö FF

- Allsvenskan: 2016

Maccabi Tel Aviv

- Toto Cup: 2017–18

KA Akureyri

- Icelandic Cup: 2024

Individual

- Úrvalsdeild Top goalscorer: 2013
- Eliteserien Forward of the Year: 2014
- Eliteserien Top goalscorer: 2014
- Norwegian Cup Top goalscorer: 2014
- Allsvenskan Forward of the Year: 2016
- Israeli Premier League Top goalscorer: 2016–17
- ONE magazine player of the week: January 2018
