= Odin Thiago Holm =

Norwegian footballer (born 2003)

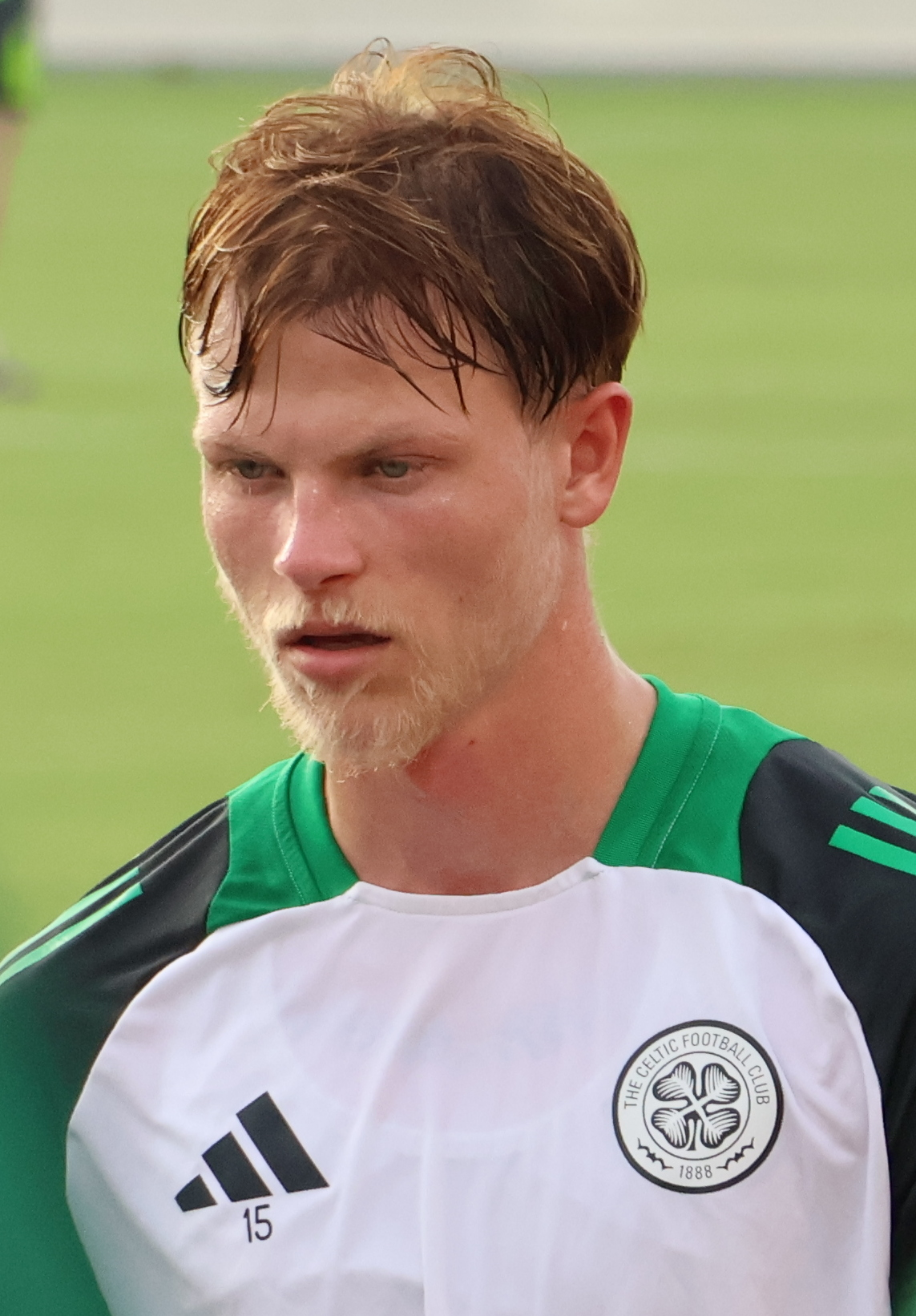
- Holm training with Celtic in 2024

Personal information
- Birth name: Odin Holm
- Date of birth: 18 January 2003 (age 23)
- Place of birth: Trondheim, Norway
- Height: 1.75 m (5 ft 9 in)
- Position: Central midfielder

Team information
- Current team: Vålerenga (on loan from Celtic)
- Number: 15

Youth career
- –2017: Kattem
- 2016: → Trygg/Lade (loan)
- 2017: Heimdal
- 2018: Ranheim

Senior career*
Years	Team	Apps	(Gls)
2019–2023	Vålerenga	68	(6)
2019	→ Tiller (loan)	7	(2)
2020–2022	Vålerenga II	14	(7)
2023–	Celtic	12	(0)
2025	→ Los Angeles FC (loan)	3	(0)
2025	→ Los Angeles FC 2 (loan)	4	(0)
2026–	→ Vålerenga (loan)	9	(0)

International career^{‡}
2018	Norway U15	7	(0)
2019	Norway U16	6	(0)
2020	Norway U17	3	(0)
2021	Norway U18	3	(1)
2022	Norway U19	1	(0)
2023	Norway U20	2	(0)
2023–	Norway U21	7	(0)
- * Club domestic league appearances and goals as of 2 September 2026 ‡ National team caps and goals as of 6 June 2024

Odin Thiago Holm (born Odin Holm; 18 January 2003) is a Norwegian professional footballer who plays as a central midfielder for Vålerenga, on loan from Scottish Premiership club Celtic.

== Club career ==
Holm started his career with Vålerenga and scored his first goal for the club on 22 December 2020 in a 4–0 win against IK Start. He was also included in The Guardian's "Next Generation 2020".

In June 2023, he moved to Scottish Premiership club Celtic on a five-year deal, for a fee of £2.6 million.

Holm joined Major League Soccer club Los Angeles FC in January 2025 on a season-long loan. Holm would only make scattered appearances with LAFC and their reserve side, Los Angeles FC 2, and would return to Celtic at the end of the loan.

== Personal life ==
In 2017, he was granted an application to the Norwegian resident registration to take Thiago as a middle name. The name change was based on the fact that he has the football player Thiago Alcântara as a role model.

In October 2025, Holm revealed he was suffering from a condition which was causing his calf muscles to put pressure on his nerves and blood vessels when running continuously and described the feeling as being "half paralysed". Holm said that he had traveled to Wyoming to test a treatment where Botox was injected into his calf muscles to allow normal blood circulation, but that the problems eventually returned so different dosage amounts were being tested.

== Career statistics ==
=== Club ===
As of match played on 31 July 2026

Appearances and goals by club, season and competition
Club	Season	League			National Cup (Note: Includes Norwegian Football Cup, Scottish Cup & U.S. Open Cup)		League Cup (Note: Includes Scottish League Cup)		Continental		Other		Total	
Club	Season	Division	Apps	Goals	Apps	Goals	Apps	Goals	Apps	Goals	Apps	Goals	Apps	Goals
Vålerenga	2019	Eliteserien	1	0	0	0	—		—		—		1	0
Vålerenga	2020	Eliteserien	16	1	0	0	—		—		—		16	1
Vålerenga	2021	Eliteserien	19	3	3	0	—		0	0	—		22	3
Vålerenga	2022	Eliteserien	22	2	1	0	—		—		—		23	2
Vålerenga	2023	Eliteserien	10	0	2	0	—		—		—		12	2
Vålerenga	Total		68	6	6	0	—		0	0	—		74	6
Tiller (loan)	2019	3. divisjon	7	2	1	0	—		—		—		8	2
Vålerenga II	2020	2. divisjon	8	1	—		—		—		—		8	1
Vålerenga II	2021	2. divisjon	5	5	—		—		—		—		5	5
Vålerenga II	2022	2. divisjon	1	1	—		—		—		—		1	1
Vålerenga II	Total		14	7	—		—		—		—		14	7
Celtic	2023–24	Scottish Premiership	9	0	1	1	1	0	2 (Note: Appearances in the UEFA Champions League)	0	–		13	1
Celtic	2024–25	Scottish Premiership	3	0	0	0	0	0	0	0	—		3	0
Celtic	2025–26	Scottish Premiership	0	0	0	0	0	0	0	0	—		0	0
Celtic	Total		12	0	1	1	1	0	2	0	–		16	1
Los Angeles FC (loan)	2025	Major League Soccer	3	0	0	0	—		2 (Note: Appearances in CONCACAF Champions Cup)	0	0 (Note: Appearances in 2025 MLS Cup playoffs)	0	5	0
Los Angeles FC 2 (loan)	2025	MLS Next Pro	4	0	—		—		—		—		4	0
Vålerenga (loan)	2026	Eliteserien	7	0	0	0	—		—		—		7	0
Career total			115	15	8	1	1	0	4	0	0	0	128	16

== Honours ==
Celtic

- Scottish Premiership: 2023–24
- Scottish Cup: 2023–24
