= Brage Skaret =

Norwegian footballer (born 2002)

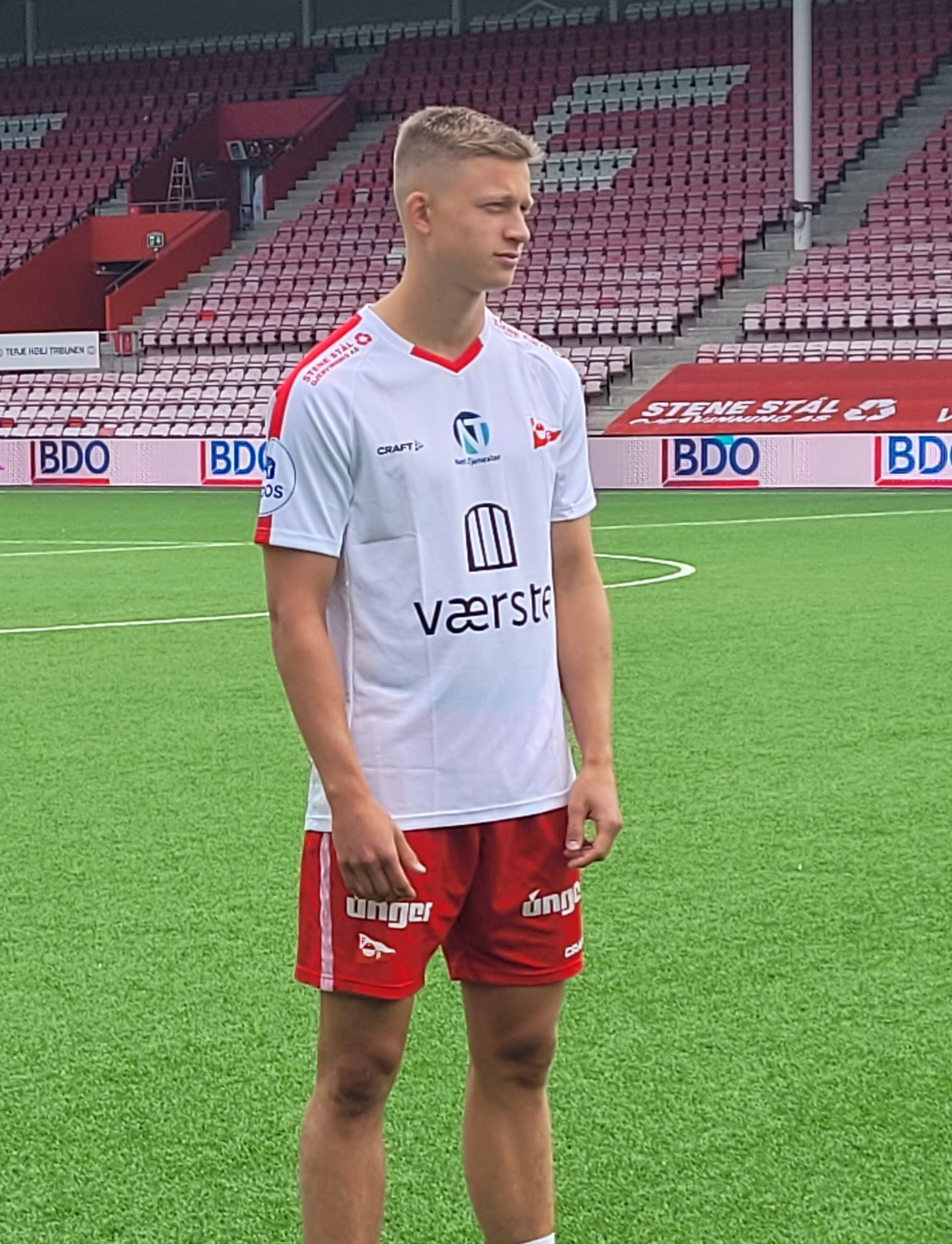
- Brage Skaret, 19. August 2022, Fredrikstad FK

Personal information
- Full name: Brage Skaret
- Date of birth: 28 April 2002 (age 24)
- Place of birth: Norway
- Position: Defender

Team information
- Current team: KFUM Oslo
- Number: 13

Youth career
- 2008–2018: Skedsmo
- 2018–2020: Vålerenga

Senior career*
Years	Team	Apps	(Gls)
2020–2022	Vålerenga	10	(0)
2022–2025	Fredrikstad	53	(0)
2025–	KFUM Oslo	13	(0)

International career^{‡}
2017	Norway U15	4	(0)
2018	Norway U16	12	(0)
2019	Norway U17	10	(0)
2021–2023	Norway U20	6	(0)
2023–2024	Norway U21	3	(0)
- * Club domestic league appearances and goals as of 23 July 2026 ‡ National team caps and goals as of 19 November 2024

Brage Skaret (born 28 April 2002) is a Norwegian professional footballer who plays for KFUM Oslo.

== Career ==
=== Vålerenga ===
He started his career in Skedsmo FK and got his senior debut in 2017 before joining the junior ranks of Vålerenga. He was promoted to the senior squad in 2020 and made his Eliteserien debut in December 2020 against Start. He started his first match in May 2021 against Molde.

=== Fredrikstad ===
He signed for Fredrikstad in August 2022.

== Career statistics ==
As of 23 July 2026

Club	Season	League			National cup		Total	
Club	Season	Division	Apps	Goals	Apps	Goals	Apps	Goals
Vålerenga	2020	Eliteserien	1	0	–		1	0
Vålerenga	2021	Eliteserien	8	0	2	1	10	1
Vålerenga	2022	Eliteserien	1	0	1	0	2	0
Vålerenga	Total		10	0	3	1	13	1
Fredrikstad	2022	1. divisjon	8	0	0	0	8	0
Fredrikstad	2023	1. divisjon	17	0	3	1	20	1
Fredrikstad	2024	Eliteserien	22	0	6	0	28	0
Fredrikstad	2025	Eliteserien	6	0	4	1	10	1
Fredrikstad	Total		53	0	13	2	66	2
KFUM Oslo	2025	Eliteserien	8	0	1	0	9	0
KFUM Oslo	2026	Eliteserien	5	0	0	0	5	0
KFUM Oslo	Total		13	0	1	0	14	0
Career total			81	0	17	3	93	3
