= Sakarias Opsahl =

Norwegian footballer (born 1999)

Personal information
- Date of birth: 17 July 1999 (age 27)
- Place of birth: Oslo, Norway
- Height: 1.87 m (6 ft 2 in)
- Position: Midfielder

Team information
- Current team: Brann
- Number: 5

Youth career
- Heming
- –2015: Stabæk
- 2016–2018: Vålerenga

Senior career*
Years	Team	Apps	(Gls)
2018–2021	Vålerenga	3	(0)
2019	→ Ull/Kisa (loan)	12	(0)
2020	→ Tromsø (loan)	29	(3)
2021	→ Tromsø (loan)	4	(0)
2021–2024	Tromsø	80	(4)
2024–	Brann	8	(0)
- * Club domestic league appearances and goals as of 15 May 2025

Sakarias Opsahl (born 17 July 1999) is a Norwegian professional footballer who plays as a midfielder for Eliteserien club Brann.

== Career ==
=== Vålerenga ===
He joined Stabæk's youth setup from IL Heming, then Vålerenga's youth setup in 2016. He signed his first professional contract in August 2018. Opsahl made his debut for Vålerenga on 16 May 2019 against Strømsgodset, in a game that ended with a 2-0 win for Vålerenga.

=== Tromsø ===
After a successful loan spell at Tromsø in the 2020 season, Opsahl returned to Vålerenga for the start of the 2021 season. However, after only two appearances for the first team, Opsahl again returned to Tromsø, on a loan deal until August, before it would be made permanent.

=== Brann ===
After less game time for Tromsø in the 2024 season, Opsahl signed a contract with fellow Eliteserien club Brann in July of 2024. The contract runs until the end of 2028.

== Personal life ==
He is the older brother of fellow footballer Oskar Opsahl.

== Career statistics ==
As of 15 May 2025

Club	Season	League			National cup		Europe		Total	
Club	Season	Division	Apps	Goals	Apps	Goals	Apps	Goals	Apps	Goals
Vålerenga	2019	Eliteserien	1	0	1	0	—		2	0
Vålerenga	2021	Eliteserien	2	0	0	0	—		2	0
Vålerenga	Total		3	0	1	0	—		4	0
Ullensaker/Kisa (loan)	2019	1. divisjon	12	0	0	0	–		12	0
Ullensaker/Kisa (loan)	Total		12	0	0	0	—		12	0
Tromsø (loan)	2020	1. divisjon	29	3	—		—		29	3
Tromsø	2021	Eliteserien	19	0	2	0	—		21	0
Tromsø	2022	Eliteserien	30	2	3	1	—		33	3
Tromsø	2023	Eliteserien	28	1	5	1	—		33	2
Tromsø	2024	Eliteserien	7	0	2	0	—		9	0
Tromsø	Total		113	6	12	2	—		125	8
Brann	2024	Eliteserien	8	0	0	0	2 (Note: Appearances in UEFA Conference League)	0	10	0
Brann	2025	Eliteserien	0	0	0	0	—		0	0
Brann	2026	Eliteserien	0	0	0	0	—		0	0
Brann	Total		8	0	0	0	2	0	10	0
Career total			137	6	13	2	2	0	152	8

== Honours ==
Tromsø

- 1. divisjon: 2020

Individual

- Eliteserien Player of the Month: June 2023
