= Albin Mörfelt =

Swedish footballer

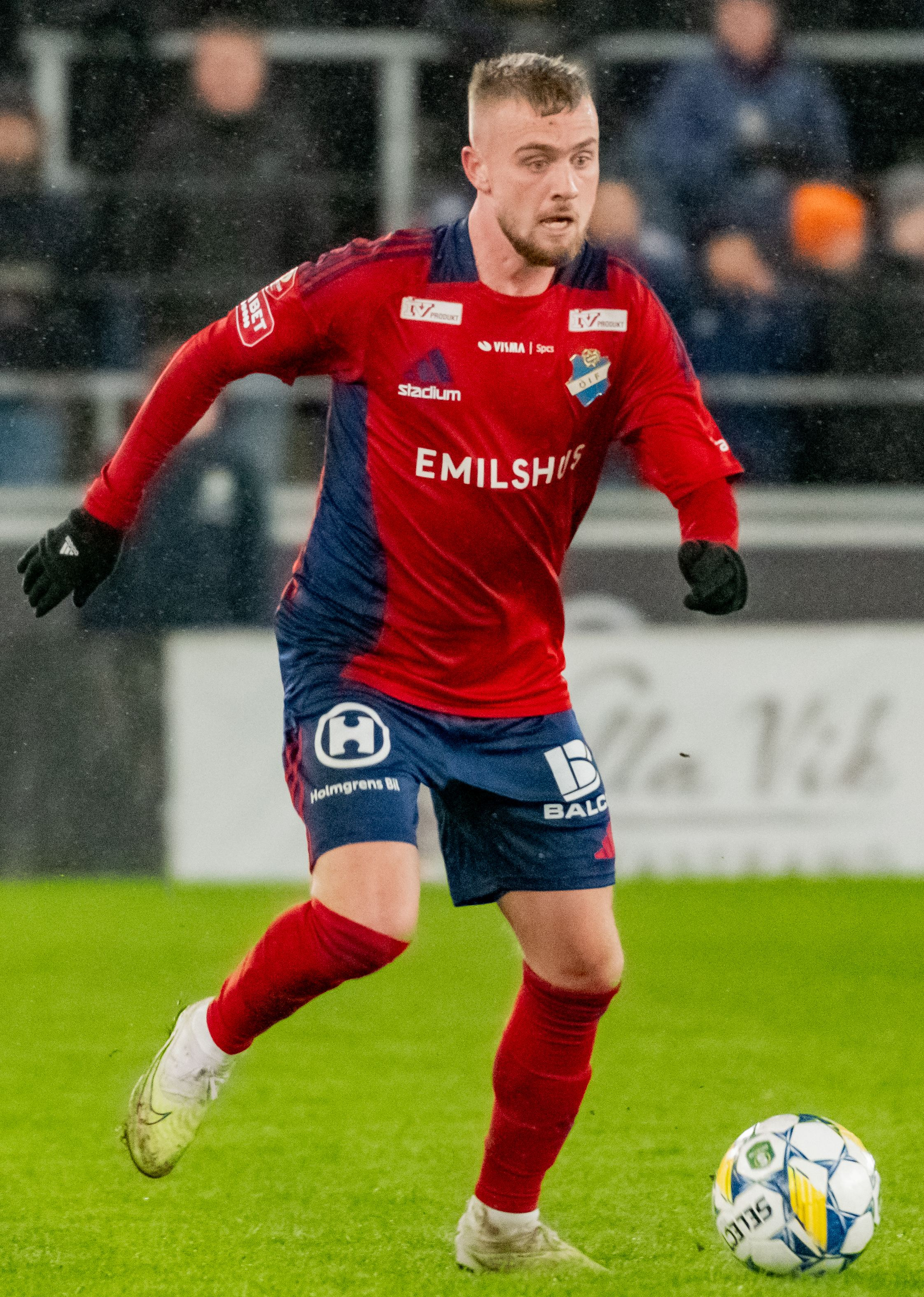

Personal information
- Full name: Chriss-Albin Alexander Mörfelt
- Date of birth: 10 January 2000 (age 26)
- Place of birth: Stockholm, Sweden
- Height: 1.79 m (5 ft 10 in)
- Position: Midfielder

Team information
- Current team: Vestri
- Number: 27

Youth career
- –2018: AIK
- 2019: Hammarby

Senior career*
Years	Team	Apps	(Gls)
2018	→ Vasalunds IF (loan)	2	(1)
2019–2020	IK Frej	28	(10)
2021	Varbergs BoIS	6	(1)
2021–2022	Vålerenga	4	(0)
2022	→ Mjällby AIF (loan)	10	(0)
2022–2023	Degerfors IF	11	(1)
2023–2025	Östers IF	39	(4)
2025	Östersund	3	(0)
2026–	Vestri	16	(2)

International career^{‡}
2016	Sweden U17	3	(0)
2017	Sweden U19	2	(0)
2021	Sweden U21	1	(0)
- * Club domestic league appearances and goals as of 13 September 2026 ‡ National team caps and goals as of 23 November 2021

Chriss-Albin Alexander Mörfelt (born 10 January 2000) is a Swedish professional footballer who plays as a midfielder for Vestri.

Mörfelt has a Norwegian father, and was called up to a Norway national under-21 football team training camp in May 2021.
