= Mathias Johnsrud Emilsen =

Norwegian footballer (born 2003)

Mathias Emilsen
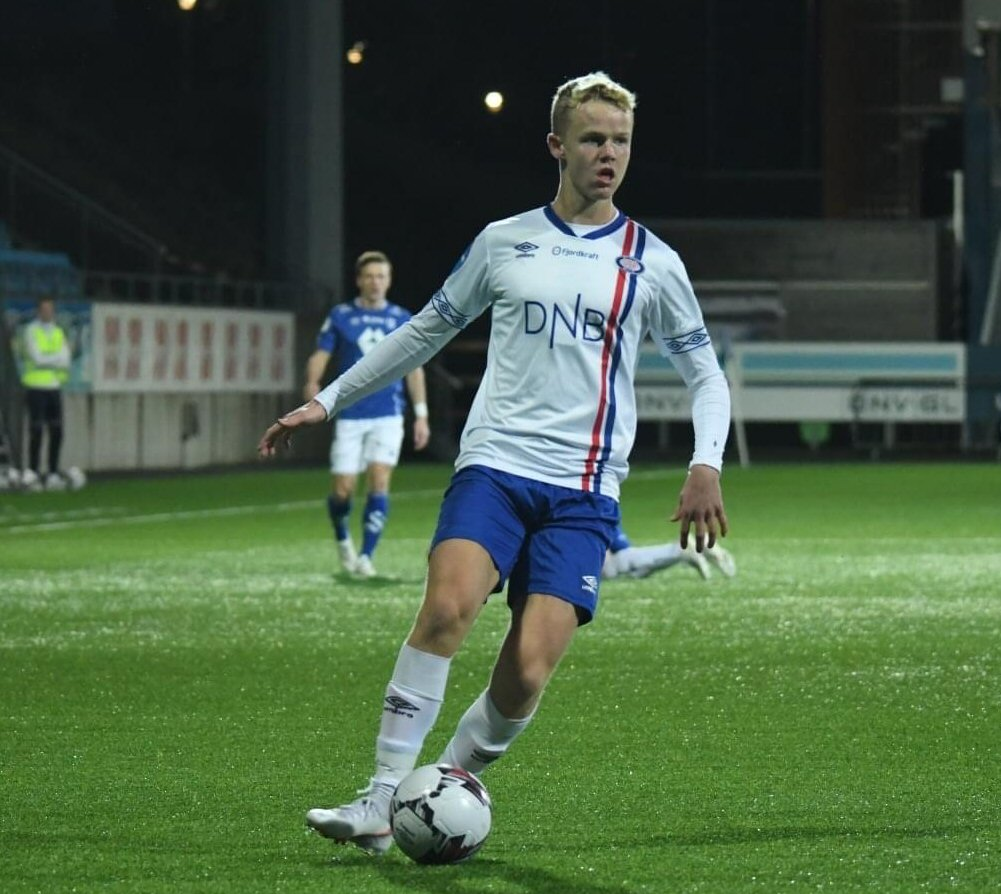
- Mathias Johnsrud Emilsen in 2020

Personal information
- Full name: Mathias Johnsrud Emilsen
- Date of birth: 8 June 2003 (age 23)
- Place of birth: Oslo, Norway
- Height: 1.86 m (6 ft 1 in)
- Position: Midfielder

Team information
- Current team: Lyn

Youth career
- –2018: Lyn
- 2019–2021: Vålerenga

Senior career*
Years	Team	Apps	(Gls)
2020–2023	Vålerenga 2	40	(0)
2021–2023	Vålerenga	5	(0)
2023	→ Sandnes Ulf (loan)	12	(0)
2023–2026	Ranheim	65	(4)
2026–	Lyn	0	(0)

International career^{‡}
2021	Norway U18	8	(0)
2022	Norway U19	4	(0)
2022	Norway U20	3	(0)
- * Club domestic league appearances and goals as of 29 June 2026 ‡ National team caps and goals as of 3 May 2023

Mathias Johnsrud Emilsen (born 8 June 2003) is a Norwegian footballer who plays as a midfielder for Lyn.

In the pre-season of 2023, it was said that Emilsen should move on from Vålerenga to get more playtime. In April 2023, he was loaned to Sandnes Ulf for the remainder of the 2023 1. divisjon season.

== Career statistics ==
=== Club ===
As of 29 June 2026.

Club	Season	League			Cup		Continental		Total	
Club	Season	Division	Apps	Goals	Apps	Goals	Apps	Goals	Apps	Goals
Vålerenga 2	2020	PostNord-ligaen	6	0	–		–		6	0
Vålerenga 2	2021	PostNord-ligaen	12	0	–		–		12	0
Vålerenga 2	2022	PostNord-ligaen	19	0	–		–		19	0
Vålerenga 2	2023	PostNord-ligaen	3	0	–		–		3	0
Vålerenga 2	Total		40	0	0	0	–		40	0
Vålerenga	2021	Eliteserien	3	0	2	0	1 (Note: Appearances in the UEFA Europa Conference League)	0	6	0
Vålerenga	2022	Eliteserien	1	0	2	0	–		3	0
Vålerenga	2023	Eliteserien	1	0	0	0	–		1	0
Vålerenga	Total		5	0	4	0	1	0	10	0
Sandnes Ulf (loan)	2023	OBOS-ligaen	12	0	2	0	–		14	0
Ranheim	2023	OBOS-ligaen	11	1	0	0	–		11	1
Ranheim	2024	OBOS-ligaen	26	3	2	0	–		28	3
Ranheim	2025	OBOS-ligaen	19	0	0	0	–		19	0
Ranheim	2026	OBOS-ligaen	9	0	0	0	–		9	0
Ranheim	Total		65	4	2	0	–		67	4
Lyn	2026	OBOS-ligaen	0	0	0	0	–		0	0
Career total			122	4	8	0	1	0	131	4
