= Sam Adekugbe =

Canadian soccer player (born 1995)

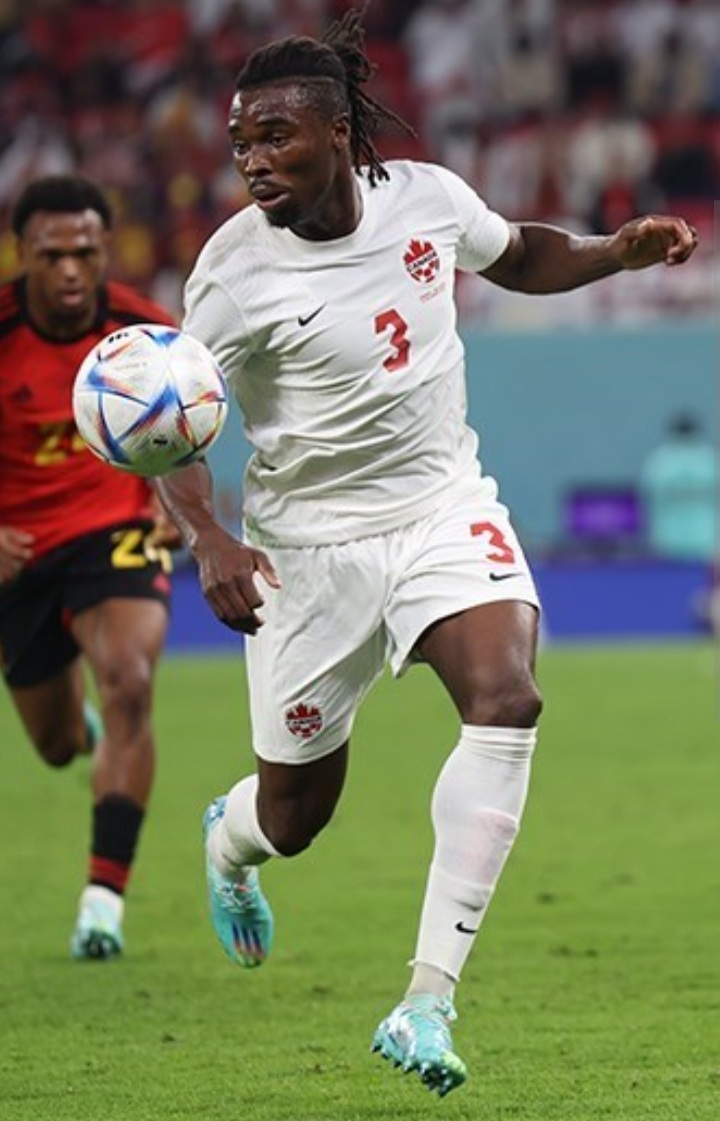
- Adekugbe playing for Canada at the 2022 FIFA World Cup

Personal information
- Full name: Samuel Ayomide Adekugbe
- Date of birth: January 16, 1995 (age 31)
- Place of birth: London, England
- Height: 1.78 m (5 ft 10 in)
- Position: Left-back

Team information
- Current team: Vancouver Whitecaps FC
- Number: 3

Youth career
- 1998–2000: Manchester United Grassroots Program
- 2000–2004: AFC Clayton
- 2004–2011: Calgary Foothills
- 2011–2013: Vancouver Whitecaps FC

Senior career*
Years	Team	Apps	(Gls)
2013–2017	Vancouver Whitecaps FC	16	(0)
2013	→ Vancouver Whitecaps FC U-23	3	(0)
2015–2016	→ Whitecaps FC 2	6	(0)
2016–2017	→ Brighton & Hove Albion (loan)	1	(0)
2017	→ IFK Göteborg (loan)	9	(0)
2018–2021	Vålerenga	89	(0)
2018	→ Vålerenga 2	1	(0)
2021–2023	Hatayspor	52	(0)
2023	→ Galatasaray (loan)	6	(0)
2023–	Vancouver Whitecaps FC	40	(3)
2026–	Whitecaps FC 2	1	(0)

International career^{‡}
2013	Canada U18	1	(0)
2014–2015	Canada U20	6	(0)
2015–	Canada	44	(1)
Medal record
Representing Canada
Men's soccer
CONCACAF Nations League
Runner-up	2023
- * Club domestic league appearances and goals as of October 6, 2026 ‡ National team caps and goals as of June 10, 2025

Samuel Ayomide Adekugbe (born January 16, 1995) is a Canadian professional soccer player who plays as a left-back for Major League Soccer club Vancouver Whitecaps FC. Born in England, he represents the Canada national team.

== Early and personal life ==
Born on January 16, 1995, in London, England, Adekugbe lived in England until the age of 10, when his family decided to move to Calgary, Alberta. He is of Nigerian descent. His younger brother Elijah is also a professional soccer player.

Adekugbe received his Canadian permanent resident card on August 23, 2013, which qualified him as a domestic player on Canadian clubs for MLS roster purposes. He became a Canadian citizen in 2016.

Adekugbe is a fan of Manchester City. He is a part-owner of Northern Super League club Calgary Wild.

== Club career ==
=== Vancouver Whitecaps FC ===
On August 28, 2013, Adekugbe signed a Generation Adidas homegrown contract with MLS club Vancouver Whitecaps FC, making him the seventh homegrown signing in club history. He made his professional debut on October 27 in the final game of the 2013 season which ended in a 3–0 victory over Colorado Rapids.

==== Loan to Brighton & Hove Albion ====
During Winter 2015, Adekugbe was invited to train at English EFL Championship club Brighton & Hove Albion. On July 15, 2016, Adekugbe transferred to Brighton on a season-long loan deal agreement, initially linking up with the club's development squad. On August 9, 2016, Adekugbe started in the 4–0 victory over Colchester United in the 2016–17 EFL Cup. On August 23, 2016, Adekugbe scored his first professional goal in a 4–2 victory over Oxford United in the second round of the 2016–17 EFL Cup.

On January 14, 2017, Adekugbe started his first Championship game in a 2–0 defeat against Preston North End.

==== Loan to IFK Göteborg ====
Adekugbe joined Allsvenskan club IFK Göteborg on loan on July 25, 2017, for the remainder of the season, with an option to buy for the club. He made his debut against IFK Norrköping in a 4–1 win on July 30.

=== Vålerenga ===
On January 8, 2018, Eliteserien club Vålerenga announced they had signed Adekugbe to a four-year deal. He made his debut against Kristiansund on March 12, 2018 In 3.5 seasons with the Oslo club, Adekugbe would play 94 games.

=== Hatayspor ===
On June 18, 2021, it was announced Adekugbe had signed a three-year deal with Turkish Süper Lig side Hatayspor, effective August 1, 2021. He made his debut on August 14 against Kasımpaşa.

==== Loan to Galatasaray ====
On 17 February 2023, he signed a loan contract with Galatasaray until the end of the 2022–23 season.

Adekugbe became the champion in the Süper Lig in the 2022–23 season with the Galatasaray team. Defeating Ankaragücü 4-1 away in the match played in the 36th week on 30 May 2023, Galatasaray secured the lead with 2 weeks before the end and won the 23rd championship in its history.

=== Return to Vancouver ===
On August 3, 2023, Adekugbe re-joined his former club Vancouver Whitecaps FC on a deal until the end of the 2026 season.

== International career ==
Adekugbe was eligible to represent England, Nigeria or Canada internationally. In 2012, he was quoted saying he dreamed of playing for England at Wembley. However, he has represented Canada at youth and senior level.

=== Youth ===
Adekugbe was part of Canada's U-18 squad for the 2013 COTIF U-20 tournament from August 11 to 21. After a successful 2014 campaign with Vancouver, Adekugbe was called up to the U20 squad by coach Rob Gale on November 7, 2014. He made his debut for the side against England on November 12 in a 1–1 draw. In January 2015 he would participate with Canada in the 2015 CONCACAF U-20 Championship.

=== Senior ===
Adekugbe received his first call up to the Canada senior team for two friendlies against Mauritania in September 2013, though he did not feature in either match. He made his debut two years later in a against Belize on September 8, 2015. In June 2017 Adekugbe was named to Canada's squad for that year's CONCACAF Gold Cup.

On November 16, 2021, during Canada's 2022 FIFA World Cup qualifier against Mexico at Edmonton's Commonwealth Stadium, Adekugbe celebrated Cyle Larin's 52nd-minute goal by diving backward into a pitchside snow bank. The celebration subsequently went viral. He scored his first goal for Canada in a 2022 FIFA World Cup qualifier against the United States on January 30, 2022. In November 2022, Adekugbe was named to the 2022 FIFA World Cup team for Canada. In Canada's third match against Morocco, he caused an own-goal, sending in a cross that deflected off Moroccan defender Nayef Aguerd into the back of the net.

In June 2023, Adekugbe was called-up to the Canadian squad contesting the 2023 CONCACAF Nations League Finals. On June 19, he was named to the 23-man squad for the 2023 CONCACAF Gold Cup, before withdrawing the day before Canada's first match.

== Career statistics ==
=== Club ===
As of match played October 6, 2026

Appearances and goals by club, season and competition
Club	Season	League			National cup		League cup		Continental		Other		Total	
Club	Season	Division	Apps	Goals	Apps	Goals	Apps	Goals	Apps	Goals	Apps	Goals	Apps	Goals
Vancouver Whitecaps FC U-23	2013	PDL	3	0	–		–		–		1 (Note: Appearance in PDL Play-offs)	0	4	0
Vancouver Whitecaps FC	2013	MLS	1	0	–		0	0	–		–		1	0
Vancouver Whitecaps FC	2014	MLS	4	0	0	0	–		–		0	0	4	0
Vancouver Whitecaps FC	2015	MLS	9	0	1	0	–		4 (Note: Appearances in CONCACAF Champions League/Cup)	0	0	0	14	0
Vancouver Whitecaps FC	2016	MLS	2	0	2	0	–		0	0	–		4	0
Vancouver Whitecaps FC	Total		16	0	3	0	0	0	4	0	0	0	23	0
Whitecaps FC 2	2015	USL	2	0	–		–		–		–		2	0
Whitecaps FC 2	2016	USL	4	0	–		–		–		0	0	4	0
Whitecaps FC 2	Total		6	0	0	0	0	0	0	0	0	0	6	0
Brighton & Hove Albion (loan)	2016–17	Championship	1	0	2	0	2	1	–		–		5	1
IFK Göteborg (loan)	2017	Allsvenskan	9	0	1	0	–		–		–		10	0
Vålerenga 2	2018	Norwegian Second Division	1	0	–		–		–		–		1	0
Vålerenga	2018	Eliteserien	27	0	2	0	–		–		–		29	0
Vålerenga	2019	Eliteserien	24	0	1	0	–		–		–		25	0
Vålerenga	2020	Eliteserien	26	0	0	0	–		–		–		26	0
Vålerenga	2021	Eliteserien	12	0	0	0	–		2 (Note: Appearances in UEFA Europa Conference League)	0	–		14	0
Vålerenga	Total		89	0	3	0	0	0	2	0	0	0	94	0
Hatayspor	2021–22	Süper Lig	34	0	3	0	–		–		–		37	0
Hatayspor	2022–23	Süper Lig	18	0	1	0	–		–		–		19	0
Hatayspor	Total		52	0	4	0	0	0	0	0	0	0	56	0
Galatasaray (loan)	2022–23	Süper Lig	6	0	0	0	–		–		–		6	0
Vancouver Whitecaps FC	2023	MLS	10	0	0	0	–		0	0	2 (Note: Appearances in MLS Cup playoffs)	1	12	1
Vancouver Whitecaps FC	2024	MLS	16	1	2	0	–		0	0	5 (Note: One appearance in Leagues Cup, four appearances in MLS Cup playoffs)	0	23	1
Vancouver Whitecaps FC	2025	MLS	7	2	1	1	–		4	0	0	0	12	3
Vancouver Whitecaps FC	2026	MLS	7	0	2	0	–		0	0	2 (Note: Appearances in Leagues Cup)	0	11	0
Vancouver Whitecaps FC	Total		40	3	5	1	0	0	4	0	9	1	58	5
Career total			223	3	18	1	2	1	10	0	10	1	263	6

=== International ===
As of match played June 10, 2025

Appearances and goals by national team and year
National team	Year	Apps	Goals
Canada	2015	2	0
Canada	2016	1	0
Canada	2017	3	0
Canada	2018	1	0
Canada	2019	2	0
Canada	2020	2	0
Canada	2021	13	0
Canada	2022	13	1
Canada	2023	5	0
Canada	2024	0	0
Canada	2025	2	0
Total		44	1

As of January 30, 2022
Scores and results list Canada's goal tally first, score column indicates score after each Adekugbe goal.

List of international goals scored by Sam Adekugbe
No.	Date	Venue	Cap	Opponent	Score	Result	Competition
1	January 30, 2022	Tim Hortons Field, Hamilton, Canada	26	United States	2–0	2–0	2022 FIFA World Cup qualification

== Honours ==
Galatasaray

- Süper Lig: 2022–23

Vancouver Whitecaps FC

- Canadian Championship: 2024
