= Christian Borchgrevink =

Norwegian football player (born 1999)

- Borchgrevink in 2026

Personal information
- Full name: Christian Dahle Borchgrevink
- Date of birth: 11 May 1999 (age 27)
- Place of birth: Oslo, Norway
- Height: 1.82 m (6 ft 0 in)
- Position: Right back

Team information
- Current team: Hearts
- Number: 2

Youth career
- Lille Tøyen
- 2008–2017: Vålerenga

Senior career*
Years	Team	Apps	(Gls)
2015–2019	Vålerenga 2	48	(5)
2017–2025	Vålerenga	108	(8)
2018	→ HamKam (loan)	6	(0)
2019	→ Notodden (loan)	7	(1)
2025–	Heart of Midlothian	11	(0)

International career^{‡}
2014	Norway U15	6	(0)
2015	Norway U16	16	(3)
2015	Norway U18	10	(3)
2018	Norway U19	5	(2)
2019	Norway U20	5	(1)
2019	Norway U21	1	(0)
- * Club domestic league appearances and goals as of 22 November 2026 ‡ National team caps and goals as of 15 November 2019

Christian Dahle Borchgrevink (born 11 May 1999) is a Norwegian professional footballer who plays as right-back for Scottish Premiership club Heart of Midlothian.

== Career ==
Borchgrevink joined Vålerenga from Lille Tøyen at the age of 9 and signed his first professional contract with the club in March 2017.

== Career statistics ==
As of 22 November 2026

Club	Season	League			Cup		Continental		Total	
Club	Season	Division	Apps	Goals	Apps	Goals	Apps	Goals	Apps	Goals
Vålerenga	2017	Eliteserien	1	0	3	0	–		4	0
Vålerenga	2018	Eliteserien	2	0	1	1	–		3	1
Vålerenga	2019	Eliteserien	11	1	2	0	–		13	1
Vålerenga	2020	Eliteserien	26	1	0	0	–		26	1
Vålerenga	2021	Eliteserien	24	3	2	0	1	0	27	3
Vålerenga	2022	Eliteserien	0	0	0	0	–		0	0
Vålerenga	2023	Eliteserien	13	1	1	0	–		14	1
Vålerenga	2024	OBOS-ligaen	29	2	3	1	–		32	3
Vålerenga	2025	Eliteserien	2	0	0	0	–		2	0
Vålerenga	Total		108	8	12	2	1	0	121	10
HamKam (loan)	2018	OBOS-ligaen	6	0	0	0	–		6	0
Notodden (loan)	2019	OBOS-ligaen	7	1	0	0	–		7	1
Hearts	2025–26	Scottish Premiership	5	0	3	0	–		8	0
Hearts	2026–27	Scottish Premiership	6	0	2	1	4	0	12	1
Hearts	Total		11	0	5	1	4	0	20	1
Career total			132	9	17	3	5	0	154	12
