= 2024 Vålerenga Fotball season =

Vålerenga
2024 season
- Chairman: Thor Gjermund Eriksen
- Head coach: Geir Bakke
- Stadium: Intility Arena
- 1. divisjon: 1st (promoted)
- Norwegian Cup: Quarter-finals
- Top goalscorer: League: Mees Rijks; Jones El-Abdellaoui (13); All: Mees Rijks (15)
Home colours	Away colours	Third colours

The 2024 season was Vålerenga Fotball's 111th season in existence and the club's first in the Norwegian First Division since 2001, following their relegation at the end of the 2023 season. In addition to the domestic league, Vålerenga Fotball participated in this season's edition of the Norwegian Football Cup.

== Players ==
=== First-team squad ===
As of 1 August 2024

Note: Flags indicate national team as defined under FIFA eligibility rules; some limited exceptions apply. Players may hold more than one non-FIFA nationality.

No.	Pos.	Nation	Player
2	DF	NOR	Christian Borchgrevink (captain)
3	MF	NOR	Aleksander Hammer Kjelsen
4	DF	NOR	Aaron Kiil Olsen
6	DF	NOR	Vegar Eggen Hedenstad
7	MF	NOR	Magnus Bech Riisnæs
8	MF	NOR	Henrik Bjørdal
9	FW	NED	Mees Rijks
14	FW	NGR	Onyebuchi Obasi
15	MF	NOR	Elias Hagen
17	MF	DEN	Carl Lange
18	DF	NOR	Simen Juklerød

No.	Pos.	Nation	Player
20	FW	NOR	Lorents Apold-Aasen
21	GK	NOR	Magnus Smelhus Sjøeng
22	MF	NOR	Stian Sjøvold Thorstensen
24	MF	NOR	Petter Strand
25	FW	NOR	Jones El-Abdellaoui
26	FW	NOR	Filip Thorvaldsen
29	MF	CMR	Brice Ambina
30	GK	NOR	Storm Strand-Kolbjørnsen
31	FW	NOR	Omar Bully Drammeh
32	DF	NOR	Max Bjurstrøm
55	DF	NOR	Sebastian Jarl
80	FW	DEN	Muamer Brajanac

=== Out on loan ===
Note: Flags indicate national team as defined under FIFA eligibility rules; some limited exceptions apply. Players may hold more than one non-FIFA nationality.

No.	Pos.	Nation	Player
1	GK	NOR	Jacob Storevik (at Viking until end of 2024)
10	FW	NOR	Mohamed Ofkir (at HamKam until end of 2024)
13	GK	NOR	Magnus Stær-Jensen (at Sogndal until end of 2024)

No.	Pos.	Nation	Player
33	DF	ALB	Eneo Bitri (at MKS Cracovia until end of 2024)

== Transfers ==
=== Winter ===
In: Note: Flags indicate national team as defined under FIFA eligibility rules; some limited exceptions apply. Players may hold more than one non-FIFA nationality.

No.	Pos.	Nation	Player
5	DF	COD	Nathan Fasika (on loan from (South Africa) Cape Town City)
9	FW	NED	Mees Rijks (from (Netherlands) Jong Utrecht)
14	FW	NGR	Obasi Onyebuchi (from (Nigeria) Beyond Limits)
19	FW	NOR	Ola Kamara (from (Sweden) Häcken)
25	MF	NOR	Jones El-Abdellaoui (loan return from KFUM)
29	MF	CMR	Brice Ambina (on loan from (South Africa) Cape Town City)

Out: Note: Flags indicate national team as defined under FIFA eligibility rules; some limited exceptions apply. Players may hold more than one non-FIFA nationality.

No.	Pos.	Nation	Player
4	DF	NOR	Stefan Strandberg (retired)
7	MF	NOR	Fredrik Oldrup Jensen (to (Netherlands) NAC Breda)
9	FW	NOR	Torgeir Børven (to Odd)
10	MF	NOR	Mohamed Ofkir (on loan to (Turkey) Manisa)
13	GK	NOR	Magnus Stær-Jensen (on loan to Sogndal)
19	FW	SRB	Andrej Ilić (to (France) Lille)
29	FW	BRA	Vitinho (loan return to (Brazil) Palmeiras)
33	DF	ALB	Eneo Bitri (on loan to (Poland) Cracovia)

=== Summer ===
In: Note: Flags indicate national team as defined under FIFA eligibility rules; some limited exceptions apply. Players may hold more than one non-FIFA nationality.

No.	Pos.	Nation	Player
17	MF	DEN	Carl Lange (from (Denmark) Vendsyssel)
29	MF	CMR	Brice Ambina (from (South Africa) Cape Town City, previously on loan)
55	DF	NOR	Sebastian Jarl (from Kristiansund)
80	FW	DEN	Muamer Brajanac (from (Denmark) Randers)

Out: Note: Flags indicate national team as defined under FIFA eligibility rules; some limited exceptions apply. Players may hold more than one non-FIFA nationality.

No.	Pos.	Nation	Player
11	MF	FIN	Daniel Håkans (to (Poland) Lech Poznań)
13	GK	NOR	Magnus Stær-Jensen (on loan to Strømmen, previously on loan at Sogndal)
23	DF	AUT	Martin Kreuzriegler (to (Austria) Grazer AK)
27	FW	NOR	Adrian Kurd Rønning (to Kristiansund)
32	DF	NOR	Max Bjurstrøm (to Kjelsås)
–	DF	ALB	Eneo Bitri (on loan to (Hungary) Győr, previously on loan at (Poland) Cracovia)
–	MF	NOR	Mohamed Ofkir (on loan to Hamkam, previously on loan at (Turkey) Manisa)

== Pre-season and friendlies ==
Win Draw Loss Fixtures

24 January 2024 Friendly	Tenerife B (Spain)	0–5	(Norway) Vålerenga	Tenerife, Spain
12:00 CET (UTC+1)		Report	Børven 14', 58'; Kjelsen 73'; Rønning 76'; Bjørdal 78'

3 February 2024 Friendly	Raufoss (Norway)	1–2	(Norway) Vålerenga	Raufoss
15:00 CET (UTC+1)	Østerud 30'	Report	Børven 53'; Hagen 88'	Stadium: Raufoss Storhall; Attendance: 644

9 February 2024 Friendly	Vålerenga (Norway)	1–2	(Norway) Strømsgodset	Oslo
13:00 CET (UTC+1)	El-Abdellaoui 66'	Report	Ardraa 78'; Farji 85'	Stadium: Vallhall Arena

16 February 2024 Friendly	Vålerenga (Norway)	1–3	(Norway) Fredrikstad	Oslo
13:00 CET (UTC+1)	Strand 63'	Report	Woledzi 6'; Sørløkk 8'; Bjørlo 60'	Stadium: Vallhall Arena

21 February 2024 Friendly	Rosenborg (Norway)	1–4	(Norway) Vålerenga	Marbella, Spain
16:00 CET (UTC+1)	Henriksen 33'	Report	Håkans 7'; Strand 32', 45+2'; Rijks 35'	Stadium: Atalaya Football Center

27 February 2024 Friendly	Brann (Norway)	3–0	(Norway) Vålerenga	Marbella, Spain
16:00 CET (UTC+1)	El-Abdellaoui 9' (o.g.); Soltvedt 59' (str.); Warming 69'	Report	Fasika (red card) 58'	Stadium: Atalaya Football Center

9 March 2024 Friendly	Vålerenga (Norway)	5–3	(Norway) Sarpsborg 08	Oslo
16:00 CET (UTC+1)	Bjørdal 27'; Rijks 41'; Håkans 53'; Borchgrevink 75'; Thorvaldsen 76'	Report	Tibbling 5'; Fasika 77' (o.g.); Zekhnini 90+1' (pen.)	Stadium: Intility Arena

17 March 2024 Friendly	Vålerenga (Norway)	3–1	(Norway) Tromsø	Oslo
14:00 CET (UTC+1)	Kreuzriegler 29'; Håkans 49'; Bjørdal 72'		Skjærvik (red card) 44'; Romsaas 82'	Stadium: Intility Arena; Attendance: 854

21 March 2024 Friendly	Vålerenga (Norway)	3–1	(Norway) Ull/Kisa	Oslo
12:00 CET (UTC+1)	Hagen 20'; Kamara 43'; Strand 59'	Report	Flores 9'	Stadium: Intility Arena
Note: The match was played 2 x 35 minutes.

26 March 2024 Friendly	AIK (Sweden)	4–0	(Norway) Vålerenga	Solna, Sweden
16:30 CET (UTC+1)	Beširović 46'; Andersson 63'; Björnström 65'; Faraj 77' (pen.)	Report		Stadium: Friends Arena

12 July 2024 Friendly	Vålerenga (Norway)	4–2	(Norway) Kongsvinger	Oslo
12:00 CEST (UTC+2)	Brajanac 70', 83'; Kamara 82'; Thorvaldsen 89'	Report	Grundt 23'; Nielsen 53'	Stadium: Intility Arena

== Competitions ==
=== Overview ===
Competition	First match	Last match	Starting round	Final position	Record							
Competition	First match	Last match	Starting round	Final position	Pld	W	D	L	GF	GA	GD	Win %
1. divisjon	1 April 2024	9 November 2024	Matchday 1	Winners	30	21	6	3	82	31	+51	70.00
Norwegian Cup	10 April 2024	6 October 2024	First round	Quarter-finals	5	3	1	1	10	3	+7	60.00
Total					35	24	7	4	92	34	+58	68.57

Last updated: 9 November 2024
Source: Soccerway

=== 1. divisjon ===
==== League table ====
Pos	Team	Pld	W	D	L	GF	GA	GD	Pts	Promotion, qualification or relegation
1	Vålerenga (C, P)	30	21	6	3	82	31	+51	69	Promotion to Eliteserien
2	Bryne (P)	30	18	4	8	50	29	+21	58	Promotion to Eliteserien
3	Moss	30	16	5	9	54	41	+13	53	Qualification for the promotion play-offs
4	Egersund	30	14	5	11	57	56	+1	47	Qualification for the promotion play-offs
5	Lyn	30	12	10	8	56	40	+16	46	Qualification for the promotion play-offs

Source: OBOS-ligaen (in Norwegian)
Rules for classification: 1) Points; 2) Goal difference; 3) Goals scored; 4) Head-to-head points; 5) Head-to-head goal difference; 6) Head-to-head goals scored.
(C) Champions; (P) Promoted

==== Results summary ====
Overall								Home						Away					
Pld	W	D	L	GF	GA	GD	Pts	W	D	L	GF	GA	GD	W	D	L	GF	GA	GD
30	21	6	3	82	31	+51	69	11	2	2	47	15	+32	10	4	1	35	16	+19

Last updated: 9 November 2024.

==== Results by round ====
Round	1	2	3	4	5	6	7	8	9	10	11	12	13	14	15	16	17	18	19	20	21	22	23	24	25	26	27	28	29	30
Ground	H	A	H	A	A	H	A	H	A	H	A	H	A	H	A	H	A	H	A	H	A	H	A	H	A	H	H	A	H	A
Result	D	W	L	D	L	W	W	L	W	W	W	W	D	W	W	W	W	W	W	W	W	W	D	W	D	W	W	W	L	W
Position	7	5	8	9	11	7	6	8	7	4	3	2	2	1	1	1	1	1	1	1	1	1	1	1	1	1	1	1	1	1

A = Away; H = Home; W = Win; D = Draw; L = Loss

==== Matches ====
1 April 2024 1	Vålerenga	1–1	Sogndal	Oslo
17:00 CEST (UTC+2)	Håkans 69'; Kreuzriegler (yellow card) 71'	Report	Flataker 37'; Flo (yellow card) 49'	Stadium: Intility Arena; Attendance: 9,164; Referee: Mischa Huru Kellerhals

6 April 2024 2	Raufoss	1–2	Vålerenga	Raufoss
16:00 CEST (UTC+2)	Østerud (yellow card) 18'; Hustad 42'; Fremstad (yellow card) 60'; Alm (yellow card) 90+6'	Report	Håkans 13'; Strand 29'; Ambina (yellow card) 45'	Stadium: Nammo Stadion; Attendance: 3,042; Referee: Jan Morten Tennøy

14 April 2024 3	Vålerenga	1–3	Stabæk	Oslo
17:00 CEST (UTC+2)	Rijks 41'; Hedenstad (yellow card) 79'	Report	Diabaté 6'; Pedersen 60', 62'; Rossbach (yellow card) 90'	Stadium: Intility Arena; Attendance: 9,097; Referee: Magnus Nicolai Koløy

20 April 2024 4	Lyn	1–1	Vålerenga	Oslo
18:00 CEST (UTC+2)	Hellum 44'; Schneider (yellow card) 90'	Report	Rijks (yellow card) 28' (yellow-red card) 37'; Håkans 33'; Strand (yellow card) 56'; Borchgrevink (yellow card) 79'	Stadium: Ullevaal Stadion; Attendance: 25,103; Referee: Espen Eskås

28 April 2024 5	Mjøndalen	5–3	Vålerenga	Mjøndalen
14:30 CEST (UTC+2)	Øverby 7'; Tokstad (yellow card) 40'; Conteh 45+3', 45+5', 75'; Holten (yellow card) 64'; K. Singh 86'; Helgeland (yellow card) 90'; Vogt (yellow card) 90+1'	Report	Strand 18'; Kreuzriegler (yellow card) 21'; Borchgrevink (yellow card) 77', (goal) 90+7'; El-Abdellaoui 90'	Stadium: Consto Arena; Attendance: 2,368; Referee: Eivind Bodding

4 May 2024 6	Vålerenga	1–0	Bryne	Oslo
16:00 CEST (UTC+2)	Steffensen 56' (o.g.); Ambina (yellow card) 66'; Kreuzriegler (yellow card) 90+2'; Olsen (yellow card) 90+3'	Report	Scriven (yellow card) 90+3'	Stadium: Intility Arena; Attendance: 6,711; Referee: Ali Al Hatam

11 May 2024 7	Aalesund	0–2	Vålerenga	Ålesund
16:00 CEST (UTC+2)	Braga (yellow card) 72'	Report	Riisnæs 29'; El-Abdellaoui 57'	Stadium: Color Line Stadion; Attendance: 4,012; Referee: Mathias Støfringshaug

16 May 2024 8	Vålerenga	0–2	Kongsvinger	Oslo
18:00 CEST (UTC+2)	Ambina (yellow card) 52'	Report	Holter 32'; Grundt 75'; Moberg (yellow card) 75'; Langrekken (yellow card) 81'	Stadium: Intility Arena; Attendance: 10,770; Referee: Ajdin Medic

22 May 2024 9	Åsane	1–5	Vålerenga	Bergen
19:00 CEST (UTC+2)	Iversen (yellow card) 24'; Skålevik (yellow card) 35'; Kolskogen (yellow card) 38'; Wollen Steen (yellow card) 74'; Eng Strand 88'	Report	Bjørdal 20', 36' (pen.); Kreuzriegler 30'; Rijks 33'; Eng Strand 89' (o.g.)	Stadium: Åsane Arena; Attendance: 1,660; Referee: Anders Bodding

26 May 2024 10	Vålerenga	3–1	Levanger	Oslo
14:30 CEST (UTC+2)	Rijks 21'; Borchgrevink (yellow card) 25'; Bjørdal (yellow card) 63'; El-Abdellaoui 77'; Strand 87'	Report	Bojadzic 74' (pen.)	Stadium: Intility Arena; Attendance: 6,991; Referee: Jan Morten Tennøy

1 June 2024 11	Ranheim	1–3	Vålerenga	Trondheim
16:00 CEST (UTC+2)	Hou Sæter 45+1'; Slørdahl (yellow card) 79'; Gaustad (yellow card) 84'	Report	Kiil Olsen (yellow card) 48'; Hedenstad 66'; Ambina (yellow card) 70'; Kamara 72', 86'	Stadium: EXTRA Arena; Attendance: 2,200; Referee: Mischa Kellerhals

9 June 2024 12	Vålerenga	5–1	Moss	Oslo
19:00 CEST (UTC+2)	Kurd Rønning 26'; Riisnæs (yellow card) 54'; Kamara 55'; Rijks 57'; El-Abdellaoui 75'; Thorvaldsen 90+3'	Report	Potur (yellow card) 41'; Strande (yellow card) 45+2'; Hoffmann (yellow card) 53', (goal) 59'; Kukleci (yellow card) 54'; Lassen Harrison (yellow card) 58'	Stadium: Intility Arena; Attendance: 9,154; Referee: Steinar Hauge

16 June 2024 13	Egersund	1–1	Vålerenga	Egersund
15:00 CEST (UTC+2)	Michalsen 66'; Falchener (yellow card) 78'	Report	Bjørdal (yellow card) 22'; El-Abdellaoui 45+2'	Stadium: Idrettsparken; Attendance: 1,613; Referee: Ali al Hatam

23 June 2024 14	Vålerenga	8–0	Sandnes Ulf	Oslo
17:00 CEST (UTC+2)	Rijks 18', 27', 55', 90'; Håkans 25', 63'; Thorvaldsen 69'; Kiil Olsen 77'	Report		Stadium: Intility Arena; Attendance: 7,462; Referee: Harald Vollstad Sletner

20 July 2024 15	Start	1–2	Vålerenga	Kristiansand
16:00 CEST (UTC+2)	Makosso (yellow card) 54'; Dashaev 63'	Report	Ambina (yellow card) 57'; Bjørdal 77'; Strand 90+6'	Stadium: Sør Arena; Attendance: 6,906; Referee: Mathias Støfringshaug

29 July 2024 16	Vålerenga	3–1	Ranheim	Oslo
19:00 CEST (UTC+2)	Jarl 25'; Riisnæs 51'; El-Abdellaoui 77'; Sjøvold (yellow card) 89'	Report	Kolstad (yellow card) 52'; Mogensen 83'	Stadium: Intility Arena; Attendance: 11,163; Referee: Mohammad Hafezi

3 August 2024 17	Moss	0–2	Vålerenga	Moss
16:00 CEST (UTC+2)	Håpnes (yellow card) 34'; Benarfa (yellow card) 35'; Strande (yellow card) 60'	Report	El-Abdellaoui 23'; Hedenstad 52'; Lange (yellow card) 89'	Stadium: Melløs Stadion; Attendance: 3,170; Referee: Mischa Kellerhals

11 August 2024 18	Vålerenga	3–0	Raufoss	Oslo
14:30 CEST (UTC+2)	Bjørdal 23'; Kiil Olsen (yellow card) 26'; Brajanac 49'; Rijks 90+5', (yellow card) 90+5'	Report	Somesi (yellow card) 21'; Hustad (yellow card) 80'; Hansen (yellow card) 83'	Stadium: Intility Arena; Attendance: 8,803; Referee: Magnus Nicolai Koløy

18 August 2024 19	Levanger	1–4	Vålerenga	Levanger
17:00 CEST (UTC+2)	Hagbø 76'; Bjeglerud (yellow card) 85'	Report	Brajanac 1', 59', 65'; El-Abdellaoui 40'	Stadium: TOBB Arena Levanger; Attendance: 2,010; Referee: Jørgen Haugen

24 August 2024 20	Vålerenga	4–2	Lyn	Oslo
18:00 CEST (UTC+2)	Ambina 22', (yellow card) 60'; Lange 24'; Brajanac 62'; El-Abdellaoui 81'	Report	Borchgrevink 3' (o.g.); Johansen 28'	Stadium: Intility Arena; Attendance: 16,556; Referee: Kristoffer Hagenes

1 September 2024 21	Sandnes Ulf	0–2	Vålerenga	Sandnes
14:30 CEST (UTC+2)	Brkić (yellow card) 49'; Høiland (yellow card) 88'	Report	Juklerød 51'; Riisnæs 65'	Stadium: Øster Hus Arena; Attendance: 2,259; Referee: Steinar Hauge

16 September 2024 22	Vålerenga	5–0	Åsane	Oslo
19:00 CEST (UTC+2)	Brajanac 10', 31'; El-Abdellaoui 41'; Strand 62'; Hagen 90+2'	Report		Stadium: Intility Arena; Attendance: 7,114; Referee: Eivind Bodding

21 September 2024 23	Bryne	1–1	Vålerenga	Bryne
16:00 CEST (UTC+2)	Bojadzic 66'	Report	El-Abdellaoui (yellow card) 27', (goal) 62'	Stadium: Bryne Stadion; Attendance: 3,043; Referee: Ole-Alexander Ekeli Valen

24 September 2024 24	Vålerenga	4–1	Aalesund	Oslo
19:00 CEST (UTC+2)	Bjørdal 13' (pen.); Rijks 17', 76'; Borchgrevink (yellow card) 45'; Strand 90+1'	Report	Nielsen (yellow card) 12'; Jóhannsson 62'; Seehusen (yellow card) 63'	Stadium: Intility Arena; Attendance: 7,407; Referee: Ali al Hatam

28 September 2024 25	Kongsvinger	2–2	Vålerenga	Kongsvinger
16:00 CEST (UTC+2)	Taylor 15'; Grundt 49'; Holter (yellow card) 61'; Langrekken (yellow card) 67'; Holmé (yellow card) 85'	Report	Ambina (yellow card) 28'; Brajanac 31', 72'; El-Abdellaoui (yellow card) 63'; Hedenstad (yellow card) 84'	Stadium: Gjemselund Stadion; Attendance: 4,133; Referee: Mathias Støfringshaug

2 October 2024 26	Vålerenga	4–2	Mjøndalen	Oslo
19:00 CEST (UTC+2)	El-Abdellaoui 15'; Lange 28'; Rijks 36'; Borchgrevink 75'	Report	Sveen 50', 67'	Stadium: Intility Arena; Attendance: 9,139; Referee: Jan Morten Tennøy

21 October 2024 27	Vålerenga	4–0	Egersund	Oslo
19:00 CEST (UTC+2)	Brajanac 19'; El-Abdellaoui (yellow card) 58', (goal) 79'; Bjørdal 70'; Rijks 86'	Report	Strangstad (yellow card) 85'	Stadium: Intility Arena; Attendance: 7,200; Referee: Magnus Nicolai Koløy

25 October 2024 28	Stabæk	1–2	Vålerenga	Bærum
19:00 CEST (UTC+2)	Spiten-Nysæter (yellow card) 39'; Diabaté 83'; Walstad (yellow card) 86'	Report	Hagen 45+1'; Kjelsen (yellow card) 55'; Bjørdal 88'	Stadium: Nadderud Stadion; Attendance: 4,542; Referee: Harald Vollstad Sletner

2 November 2024 29	Vålerenga	1–1	Start	Oslo
16:00 CET (UTC+1)	Bjørdal (yellow card) 34'; Sjøvold (yellow card) 40'; Ambina 48'; Hagen (yellow card) 57'	Report	Schulze 4'; Grønli (yellow card) 88'	Stadium: Intility Arena; Attendance: 9,671; Referee: Johan William Grundt

9 November 2024 30	Sogndal	0–3	Vålerenga	Sogndalsfjøra
16:00 CET (UTC+1)	Blixt Flaten (yellow card) 8'; Robertsen (yellow card) 73'	Report	Brajanac 11'; Hagen 50'; Onyebuchi 90', (yellow card) 90+1'	Stadium: Fosshaugane Campus; Attendance: 2,621; Referee: Jørgen Haugen

=== Norwegian Football Cup ===
10 April 2024 First round	Union Carl Berner	0–3	Vålerenga	Oslo
17:00 CEST (UTC+2)	Hebæk (yellow card) 59'; Flåte (yellow card) 88'	Report	Rijks 52'; Riisnæs 67', 82'; Storevik (yellow card) 88'	Stadium: Jordal Idrettspark; Referee: Stian Røvig Sletner

25 April 2024 Second round	Oppsal	0–4	Vålerenga	Oslo
17:00 CEST (UTC+2)	Sanyang (yellow card) 45'; Roba (yellow card) 57'; Nguyen (yellow card) 69'	Report	El-Abdellaoui 25'; Hedenstad 51'; Kjelsen 61'; Rijks 86'	Stadium: Trasop idrettspark Attendance: 3,248; Referee: Ole-Alexander Ekeli Valen

1 May 2024 Third round	Vålerenga	1–0 (a.e.t.)	Tromsø	Oslo
16:00 CEST (UTC+2)	Borchgrevink (yellow card) 90+1'; Ambina (yellow card) 96'; Juklerød 100'; Riisnæs (yellow card) 115'	Report	Guddal (yellow card) 9'; Robertsen (yellow card) 40'; Norheim (yellow card) 86'; Jenssen (yellow card) 109'	Stadium: Intility Arena; Attendance: 7,135; Referee: Tore Hansen

8 May 2024 Fourth round	Vålerenga	2–2 (a.e.t.) (4–3 p)	HamKam	Oslo
18:00 CEST (UTC+2)	Hagen 5'; Riisnæs 23' (yellow card) 64'; Bjørdal (yellow card) 27'; Rijks (yellow card) 87'; Hammer Kjelsen (yellow card) 90+1'; Borchgrevink (yellow card) 120'	Report	Kiil Olsen 53' (o.g.); Kurtovic (yellow card) 54'; Kirkevold (yellow card) 82'; Simenstad 90+4' (yellow card) 119'	Stadium: Intility Arena; Attendance: 7,042; Referee: Kristoffer Hagenes
	Penalties
	Kreuzriegler (penalty missed); Kamara (penalty scored); Hedenstad (penalty scored); Kiil Olsen (penalty missed); Borchgrevink (penalty scored); Ambina (penalty scored)		(penalty missed) Mares; (penalty scored) Simenstad; (penalty missed) Gonstad; (penalty scored) Kirkevold; (penalty scored) Jónsson; (penalty missed) Norheim

6 October 2024 Quarter-finals	Vålerenga	0–1 (a.e.t.)	Fredrikstad	Oslo
18:00 CEST (UTC+2)	Kiil Olsen (yellow card) 42'; Ambina (yellow card) 96'	Report	Woledzi (yellow card) 25'; Bjørlo 97'; Kjær (yellow card) 118'	Stadium: Intility Arena; Attendance: 13,276; Referee: Sigurd Smehus Kringstad
