= 2026 Vålerenga Fotball season =

Vålerenga
2026 season
- Chairman: Thor Gjermund Eriksen
- Head coach: Geir Bakke (until 6 May); Johannes Moesgaard (from 13 May)
- Stadium: Intility Arena
- Eliteserien: 9th
- 2026–27 Norwegian Cup: Pre-season
Home colours	Away colours

The 2026 season is the 113th season in the history of Vålerenga Fotball and the second consecutive season in the Eliteserien. In addition, Vålerenga will participate in the 2026–27 Norwegian Football Cup.

== Transfers ==
=== In ===
Pos.	Player	Transferred from	Fee	Date	Source
FW	(Denmark) Lucas Haren	(Norway) Kongsvinger		3 December 2025	
MF	(Denmark) Magnus Westergaard	(England) Wycombe Wanderers		8 January 2026	
DF	(Iceland) Kolbeinn Finnsson	(Netherlands) FC Utrecht		2 February 2026	
FW	(Nigeria) Onyebuchi Obasi	(Sweden) FC Stockholm	Loan return	30 June 2026	

=== Out ===
Pos.	Player	Transferred to	Fee	Date	Source
FW	(Nigeria) Promise Meliga	(Norway) Kristiansund	Loan	13 March 2026	
FW	(Nigeria) Onyebuchi Obasi	(Denmark) Hobro	Undisclosed	1 July 2026	
MF	(Denmark) Elias Sørensen	(Netherlands) PEC Zwolle	Undisclosed	1 July 2026	

== Pre-season and friendlies ==
30 January 2026 Friendly	Vålerenga (Norway)	4–0	(Sweden) Örgryte IS

6 February 2026 Friendly	Vålerenga (Norway)	5–2	(Norway) Sandefjord

14 February 2026 Friendly	Djurgården (Sweden)	2–1	(Norway) Vålerenga

21 February 2026 Friendly	Vålerenga (Norway)	3–2	(Norway) Tromsø

21 February 2026 Friendly	Vålerenga (Norway)	1–0	(Norway) KFUM Oslo

27 February 2026 Friendly	Rosenborg (Norway)	0–1	(Norway) Vålerenga

7 March 2026 Friendly	Vålerenga (Norway)	4–3	(Norway) Strømsgodset	Oslo
		Report		Stadium: Intility Arena

27 March 2026 Friendly	Vålerenga (Norway)	3–3	(Sweden) IFK Göteborg	Oslo
		Report		Stadium: Intility Arena

18 June 2026 Friendly	IFK Göteborg (Sweden)	1–1	(Norway) Vålerenga	Gothenburg
17:00				Stadium: Hjällbovallen

27 June 2026 Friendly	GAIS (Sweden)	2–1	(Norway) Vålerenga	Strömstad
14:00				Stadium: Strömsvallen

4 July 2026 Friendly	Vålerenga (Norway)	3–1	(Norway) Fredrikstad	Oslo
14:00	9'; 14'; 32'		29'; (penalty missed) , 45+1	Stadium: Intility Arena

== Competitions ==
=== Overall record ===
Competition	First match	Last match	Starting round	Record							
Competition	First match	Last match	Starting round	Pld	W	D	L	GF	GA	GD	Win %
Eliteserien	15 March 2026		Matchday 1	11	4	2	5	13	17	−4	36.36
2026–27 Norwegian Football Cup				0	0	0	0	0	0	+0	—
Total				11	4	2	5	13	17	−4	36.36

Last updated: 29 May 2026
Source: Competitions

=== Eliteserien ===
Pos	Team	Pld	W	D	L	GF	GA	GD	Pts
6	Tromsø	26	11	7	8	43	40	+3	40
7	Brann	26	10	3	13	47	44	+3	33
8	Vålerenga	26	9	5	12	43	47	−4	32
9	Sarpsborg	26	8	7	11	32	42	−10	31
10	KFUM	26	8	7	11	33	46	−13	31

Updated to match(es) played on 9 November 2026. Source: Football Association of Norway (in Norwegian)
Rules for classification: 1) Points; 2) Goal difference; 3) Goals scored; 4) Head-to-head points; 5) Head-to-head goal difference; 6) Head-to-head goals scored.

==== Results summary ====
Overall								Home						Away					
Pld	W	D	L	GF	GA	GD	Pts	W	D	L	GF	GA	GD	W	D	L	GF	GA	GD
26	9	5	12	43	47	−4	32	6	2	5	27	20	+7	3	3	7	16	27	−11

Last updated: 9 November 2026.
Source: soccerway

==== Results by round ====
Round	1	2	3	4	5	6	7	8	9	10	11	12	13	14	15	16	17	18	19	20	21	22	23	24	25	26	27	28	29	30
Ground	H	A	H	A	H	A	H	A	H	A	H	A	A	H	A	H	H	A	H	A	A	H	A	H	H	A	H	A	H	A
Result	W	W	L	D	L	L	D	L	W	L	W	W	L	W	W	L	L	D	L	D	L	D	L	W	W	L				
Position	7	2	5	4	7	11	10	10	8	12	9	7	8	7	7	7	8	9	10	10	10	10	11	10	8	8				

Updated to match(es) played on 9 November 2026. Source: worldfootball
A = Away; H = Home; W = Win; D = Draw; L = Loss

==== Matches ====
The match schedule was issued on 19 December 2025.

15 March 2026 1	Vålerenga	1–0	Sandefjord	Oslo
17:00 CEST (UTC+2)	Lange 5'	Report	Möller (penalty missed) 60'; Lambrix (yellow card) 61'	Stadium: Intility Arena; Attendance: 12,263; Referee: Rohit Saggi

22 March 2026 2	Rosenborg	0–2	Vålerenga	Trondheim
14:30 CEST (UTC+2)	Witry (yellow card) 85'	Report	Lange 58'; Näsberg 63'; Finnsson (yellow card) 65'; Haren (yellow card) 78'	Stadium: Lerkendal Stadion; Attendance: 13,374; Referee: Sigurd Kringstad

6 April 2026 3	Vålerenga	0–1	Viking	Oslo
14:30 CEST (UTC+2)	Kiil Olsen (yellow card) 35'; Sørensen (yellow card) 45'; Jarl (on bench) (red card) 90+8'	Report	Falchener (yellow card) 10'; Kvia-Egeskog 45', (yellow card) 61'; Heggheim (yellow card) 73'; Tripić (on bench) (yellow card) 90+8'	Stadium: Intility Arena; Attendance: 14,712; Referee: Tore Hansen

12 April 2026 4	Fredrikstad	1–1	Vålerenga	Fredrikstad
17:00 CEST (UTC+2)	Nuñez (yellow card) 77'; Eid 79'; Kvile (yellow card) 90+6'	Report	Grundetjern 25'; Westergaard (yellow card) 55'; Näsberg (yellow card) 60'; Sæter (yellow card) 90+6'	Stadium: Fredrikstad Stadion; Attendance: 10,234; Referee: Sivert Amland

19 April 2026 5	Vålerenga	0–2	Lillestrøm	Oslo
14:30 CEST (UTC+2)	Lange (yellow card) 45'; Ambina (yellow card) 45+4'; Kiil Olsen (yellow card) 90+12'	Report	Ranger (yellow card) 39'; Karlsbakk 86', (yellow card) 90'; Nyheim (yellow card) 90+11'; Gabrielsen (yellow card) 90+11'; Arierhi 90+13'; Dahlberg (yellow card) 90+15'	Stadium: Intility Arena; Attendance: 16,556; Referee: Sigurd Kringstad

26 April 2026 6	Molde	5–1	Vålerenga	Molde
14:30 CEST (UTC+2)	Gulbrandsen 21', 55', (yellow card) 38'; Breivik 51'; Hestad 57'; Granaas 86'	Report	Haren 45+1'; Sjåtil (yellow card) 48'	Stadium: Aker Stadion; Attendance: 5,461; Referee: Christian Moen

3 May 2026 7	Vålerenga	2–2	KFUM	Oslo
19:15 CEST (UTC+2)	Hoseth 2' (o.g.); Sjåtil (yellow card) 39'; Haren 51'; Bjørdal (yellow card) 64'; Finnsson (yellow card) 82'; Hedenstad (yellow card) 90+3'; Grundetjern (yellow card) 90+7'; Näsberg (yellow card) 90+8'	Report	Grødem 33'; Sjøkvist (yellow card) 45+2'; Wolff Eikrem 55'	Stadium: Intility Arena; Attendance: 11,244; Referee: Espen Eskås

8 May 2026 8	HamKam	1–0	Vålerenga	Hamar
19:00 CEST (UTC+2)	Udahl 7'	Report	Westergaard (yellow card) 28'; Kiil Olsen (yellow card) 50'; Finnsson (yellow card) 72'; Bjørdal (yellow card) 74'	Stadium: Briskeby; Attendance: 6,608; Referee: Svein Tore Sinnes

16 May 2026 9	Vålerenga	3–2	Sarpsborg 08	Oslo
20:00 CEST (UTC+2)	Thorvaldsen 6'; Sørensen (penalty missed) 20', 20'; Kiil Olsen (yellow card) 30'; Grundetjern 90'	Report	Karlsbakk 11'; Nibe 28'	Stadium: Intility Arena; Attendance: 12,889; Referee: Marius Lien

25 May 2026 10	Start	2–0	Vålerenga	Kristiansand
14:30 CEST (UTC+2)	Cornelius 5'; Mvoué 32'; Pålerud (yellow card) 71'	Report		Stadium: Sparebanken Norge Arena Kristiansand; Attendance: 9,601; Referee: Rohit Saggi

29 May 2026 11	Vålerenga	3–1	Kristiansund	Oslo
19:00 CEST (UTC+2)	Haren 1'; Ambina (yellow card) 27'; Lange 69'; Westergaard 75'	Report	Kilen (yellow card) 52'; Alvheim 83'	Stadium: Intility Arena; Attendance: 9,465; Referee: Tore Hansen

11 July 2026 13	Tromsø	–	Vålerenga	Tromsø
: CEST (UTC+2)				Stadium: Romssa Arena

16 July 2026 14	Vålerenga	–	Aalesund	Oslo
: CEST (UTC+2)				Stadium: Intility Arena

26 July 2026 15	Brann	–	Vålerenga	Bergen
: CEST (UTC+2)				Stadium: Brann Stadion

31 July 2026 16	Vålerenga	–	HamKam	Oslo
: CEST (UTC+2)				Stadium: Intility Arena

8 August 2026 17	Vålerenga	–	Bodø/Glimt	Oslo
: CEST (UTC+2)				Stadium: Intility Arena

16 August 2026 18	Aalesund	–	Vålerenga	Ålesund
: CEST (UTC+2)				Stadium: Color Line Stadion

30 August 2026 19	Vålerenga	–	Molde	Oslo
: CEST (UTC+2)				Stadium: Intility Arena

6 September 2026 20	Sarpsborg	–	Vålerenga	Sarpsborg
: CEST (UTC+2)				Stadium: Sarpsborg Stadion

=== Norwegian Football Cup ===
23 August 2026 First round	Christiania	v	Vålerenga	Oslo
17:00 CEST (UTC+2)		Report		Stadium: Jordal Idrettspark
