= 2025 Vålerenga Fotball season =

Vålerenga
2025 season
- Chairman: Thor Gjermund Eriksen
- Manager: Geir Bakke
- Stadium: Intility Arena
- Eliteserien: 6th
- 2025 Norwegian Cup: First round
- 2025–26 Norwegian Cup: Third round
- Top goalscorer: League: Elias Sørensen (12); All: Elias Sørensen (12)
- Average home league attendance: 10,285
Home colours	Away colours	Third colours

The 2025 season was Vålerenga Fotball's 112th season in existence and marks their return to the top flight of Norwegian football following promotion in 2024. In addition to the domestic league, Vålerenga Fotball participated in both the 2025 and 2025–26 editions of the Norwegian Cup.

== Transfers ==
=== In ===
Pos.	Player	Transferred from	Fee	Date	Source
DF	(Finland) Noah Pallas	(Finland) HJK Helsinki	Undisclosed	30 January 2025	
FW	(Denmark) Elias Sørensen	(England) Portsmouth	€300,000	30 January 2025	
DF	(Democratic Republic of the Congo) Kevin Tshiembe	(Denmark) Brøndby		12 February 2025	
DF	(Norway) Håkon Sjåtil	(Norway) Kristiansund BK		18 February 2025	
DF	(Brazil) Vinícius Nogueira	(Sweden) Halmstads BK	Loan	28 March 2025	

=== Out ===
Pos.	Player	Transferred to	Fee	Date	Source
MF	(Norway) Jones El-Abdellaoui	(Spain) Celta Vigo	Undisclosed	8 January 2025	
GK	(Norway) Storm Strand-Kolbjørnsen	(Norway) Start	Undisclosed	17 February 2025	
DF	(Norway) Aleksander Hammer Kjelsen	(Norway) Aalesund	Undisclosed	4 March 2025	

== Pre-season and friendlies ==
Win Draw Loss Fixtures

22 January 2025 Friendly	Ibarra (Spain)	1–4	(Norway) Vålerenga	Tenerife, Spain
13:00 CET (UTC+1)	Sergio Tonini	Report	Bjørdal; Sørensen; Onyebuchi	Stadium: Tenerife Top Training

1 February 2025 Friendly	Vålerenga (Norway)	1–0	(Norway) Sarpsborg 08	Oslo
15:00 CET (UTC+1)	Lange 90'	Report		Stadium: Vallhall Arena

8 February 2025 Friendly	Vålerenga (Norway)	5–2	(Norway) Skeid	Oslo
12:00 CET (UTC+1)	Brajanac 34', 52'; Bjørdal 39'; Rijks 79', 90+3'	Report	Diallo Toure 84'; Rise 88'	Stadium: Vallhall Arena

22 February 2025 Friendly	Vålerenga (Norway)	3–1	(Norway) Viking	Marbella, Spain
17:00 CET (UTC+1)	Brajanac 33', 58'; Sørensen 55'; Otu (red card) 88'	Report	Bell 52'	Stadium: Marbella Football Center

3 March 2025 Friendly	Vålerenga (Norway)	1–1	(Iceland) FH Hafnarfjarðar	Marbella, Spain
16:30 CET (UTC+1)	Sørensen 37'		Sverrisson 53'	Stadium: Marbella Football Center

7 March 2025 Friendly	Vålerenga (Norway)	0–1	(Norway) Strømsgodset	Oslo
12:00 CET (UTC+1)			Melkersen 83'	Stadium: Intility Arena

15 March 2025 Friendly	Vålerenga (Norway)	1–4	(Norway) Tromsø	Oslo
15:00 CET (UTC+1)	Hagen 78'		Hjertø-Dahl 45+1'; Erlien 59'; Antonsen 74'; Braut 89'	Stadium: Intility Arena

22 March 2025 Friendly	Brann (Norway)	2–1	(Norway) Vålerenga	Bergen
16:00 CET (UTC+1)	Soltvedt 9'; Heggebø 76'		Thorvaldsen 43'	Stadium: Åsane Arena

13 June 2025 Friendly	Vålerenga (Norway)	4–1	(Norway) Sarpsborg 08	Oslo
12:00 CEST (UTC+2)	Sørensen 39', 42'; Brajanac 58'; Pallas 61'		Karlsbakk 37'	Stadium: Intility Arena

== Competitions ==
=== Overview ===
Competition	First match	Last match	Starting round	Final position	Record							
Competition	First match	Last match	Starting round	Final position	Pld	W	D	L	GF	GA	GD	Win %
Eliteserien	30 March 2025	30 November 2025	Matchday 1	6th	30	13	4	13	49	50	−1	43.33
2025 Norwegian Cup	13 April 2025		First round	First round	1	0	1	0	1	1	+0	0.00
2025–26 Norwegian Cup	23 September 2025		Third round	Third round	1	0	0	1	1	2	−1	0.00
Total					32	13	5	14	51	53	−2	40.63

Last updated: 30 November 2025
Source: Competitions

=== Eliteserien ===
==== League table ====
Pos	Team	Pld	W	D	L	GF	GA	GD	Pts	Qualification or relegation
4	Brann	30	17	5	8	55	46	+9	56	Qualification for the Conference League second qualifying round
5	Sandefjord	30	15	3	12	55	42	+13	48	
6	Vålerenga	30	13	4	13	49	50	−1	43	
7	Rosenborg	30	11	9	10	45	42	+3	42	
8	Fredrikstad	30	11	9	10	38	35	+3	42	

Source: Football Association of Norway (in Norwegian)
Rules for classification: 1) Points; 2) Goal difference; 3) Goals scored; 4) Head-to-head points; 5) Head-to-head goal difference; 6) Head-to-head goals scored.

==== Results summary ====
Overall								Home						Away					
Pld	W	D	L	GF	GA	GD	Pts	W	D	L	GF	GA	GD	W	D	L	GF	GA	GD
30	13	4	13	49	50	−1	43	9	3	3	31	18	+13	4	1	10	18	32	−14

Last updated: 30 November 2025.
Source: NFF

==== Results by round ====
Round	1	2	3	4	5	6	7	8	9	10	11	12	13	14	15	16	17	18	19	20	21	22	23	24	25	26	27	28	29	30
Ground	H	A	H	A	H	A	H	A	A	H	A	H	A	H	A	H	A	H	A	H	A	H	A	H	A	H	H	A	H	A
Result	W	D	L	W	L	L	D	W	L	L	W	D	L	W	L	W	L	W	W	W	L	D	L	W	L	W	W	L	W	L
Position	2	3	8	7	9	11	10	10	11	11	9	9	12	9	10	10	11	10	9	6	7	7	9	7	9	6	5	7	6	6

Source: NFF
A = Away; H = Home; W = Win; D = Draw; L = Loss

==== Matches ====
The match schedule was announced on 20 December 2024.

30 March 2025 1	Vålerenga	3–1	Viking	Oslo
14:30 CEST (UTC+2)	Brajanac (yellow card) 40'; Sørensen 41', (yellow card) 50'; Bjørdal 66', 80'; Lange (yellow card) 83'	Report	Heggheim (yellow card) 5'; Tripić (yellow card) 34'; Roseth (yellow card) 50' (yellow-red card) 57'; Rafn Mikaelsson 63'	Stadium: Intility Arena; Attendance: 14,859; Referee: Rohit Saggi

6 April 2025 2	Sarpsborg 08	1–1	Vålerenga	Sarpsborg
17:00 CEST (UTC+2)	Christiansen (yellow card) 66'; Carstensen 77'; Sandberg (yellow card) 90'	Report	Sørensen (yellow card) 23'; Bech Riisnæs 45+1'	Stadium: Sarpsborg Stadion; Attendance: 7,223; Referee: Marius Lien

9 April 2025 17	Fredrikstad	2–0	Vålerenga	Fredrikstad
19:00 CEST (UTC+2)	Fall (yellow card) 17', (goal) 39'; Woledzi (yellow card) 72'; Holten 76' (pen.)	Report	Bjørdal (yellow card) 43'; Rijks (yellow card) 59'; Riisnæs (yellow card) 90+4'	Stadium: Fredrikstad Stadion; Attendance: 10,010; Referee: Marius Hansen Grøtta
Note: The match was rescheduled due to Fredrikstad's participation in the qualifying rounds of the 2025–26 UEFA Europa League.

21 April 2025 3	Vålerenga	0–2	Rosenborg	Oslo
14:30 CEST (UTC+2)	Ambina (yellow card) 37'	Report	Broholm 2', (yellow card) 88'; Konradsen Ceïde 65'; Pereira (yellow card) 70'	Stadium: Intility Arena; Attendance: 16,556; Referee: Sigurd Smehus Kringstad

27 April 2025 4	Kristiansund	0–2	Vålerenga	Kristiansund
17:00 CEST (UTC+2)	Isah (yellow card) 33'	Report	Vinícius (yellow card) 6', (goal) 72'; Lange (yellow card) 11'; Ambina (yellow card) 30'; Sørensen 90+4'	Stadium: Kristiansund Stadion; Attendance: 3,181; Referee: Kristoffer Hagenes

3 May 2025 5	Vålerenga	2–4	Brann	Oslo
18:00 CEST (UTC+2)	Brajanac 48'; Vinícius (yellow card) 52'; Riisnæs 53'; Strand (yellow card) 75'	Report	Kornvig 4', (yellow card) 33'; Gudmundsson 36'; Pallesen Knudsen (yellow card) 39'; Helland (yellow card) 72'; Sande 81'; Heggebø 90+6' (pen.)	Stadium: Intility Arena; Attendance: 16,556; Referee: Tore Hansen

11 May 2025 6	Sandefjord	2–1	Vålerenga	Sandefjord
17:00 CEST (UTC+2)	Sigurðarson 34'; Melchior 76'; Patoulidis (yellow card) 82'	Report	Riisnæs (yellow card) 21' (yellow-red card) 63'; Ambina 39'; Tshiembe (yellow card) 83'	Stadium: Jotun Arena; Attendance: 6,011; Referee: Mathias Støfringshaug

16 May 2025 7	Vålerenga	1–1	HamKam	Oslo
20:00 CEST (UTC+2)	Lange 8'; Hedenstad (yellow card) 21'; Sørensen (yellow card) 33'; Tshiembe (yellow card) 90+1'	Report	Lien 29', (yellow card) 32'; Sjølstad (yellow card) 34'; Ekeroth (yellow card) 41'	Stadium: Intility Arena; Attendance: 13,300; Referee: Mohammad Usman Aslam

26 May 2025 8	KFUM	0–1	Vålerenga	Oslo
19:00 CEST (UTC+2)	Kristensen (yellow card) 18'; Hestnes (red card) 40'; Hoseth (yellow card) 54'; Aleesami (yellow card) 72'	Report	Thorvaldsen (yellow card) 54', (goal) 64'; Kiil Olsen (yellow card) 88'	Stadium: KFUM Arena; Attendance: 3,501; Referee: Marius Hansen Grøtta

31 May 2025 9	Tromsø	2–1	Vålerenga	Tromsø
18:45 CEST (UTC+2)	Edvardsson (yellow card) 22', (goal) 52'; Skjærvik (yellow card) 66'; Erlien 68'; Kinteh (yellow card) 71'	Report	Vinícius (yellow card) 54'; Ambina (yellow card) 63'; Sørensen 67'	Stadium: Romssa Arena; Attendance: 5,291; Referee: Sigurd Smehus Kringstad

22 June 2025 10	Vålerenga	2–3	Molde	Oslo
14:30 CEST (UTC+2)	Thorvaldsen 23'; Ambina 42'; Lange (yellow card) 60'	Report	Eikrem 7'; Stenevik (yellow card) 52'; Enggård (yellow card) 58'; Daga 80'; Gulbrandsen 84'; Breivik (yellow card) 90+4'	Stadium: Intility Arena; Attendance: 13,592; Referee: Tore Hansen

29 June 2025 11	Strømsgodset	0–2	Vålerenga	Drammen
19:15 CEST (UTC+2)		Report	Rijks 39'; Strand 46'	Stadium: Marienlyst Stadion; Attendance: 6,521; Referee: Marius Hansen Grøtta

5 July 2025 12	Vålerenga	1–1	Fredrikstad	Oslo
18:00 CEST (UTC+2)	Strand 45'	Report	Shein 4'; Owusu (yellow card) 26'; Eid (yellow card) 38'; Metcalfe (yellow card) 89'	Stadium: Intility Arena; Attendance: 10,563; Referee: Daniel Higraff

13 July 2025 13	Bryne	1–0	Vålerenga	Bryne
14:30 CEST (UTC+2)	Bojadzic (yellow card) 72'; Scriven 76', (yellow card) 90'	Report	Sjåtil (yellow card) 33'	Stadium: Bryne Stadion; Attendance: 2,598; Referee: Mohammad Usman Aslam

20 July 2025 14	Vålerenga	3–0	Haugesund	Oslo
14:30 CEST (UTC+2)	Ambina 64'; Sørensen 84', 90+1'; Brajanac (yellow card) 90+7'	Report	Nyhammer (yellow card) 57'; Leite (yellow card) 63'; Dia (yellow card) 77'	Stadium: Intility Arena; Attendance: 8,619; Referee: Kristoffer Hagenes

26 July 2025 15	Bodø/Glimt	7–2	Vålerenga	Bodø
18:00 CEST (UTC+2)	Saltnes 4'; Määttä 25'; Hauge 49'; Høgh 61'; Bjørtuft 72'; Fet 78'; Berg 87'	Report	Grundetjern 7'; Kiil Olsen 52'	Stadium: Aspmyra Stadion; Attendance: 7,677; Referee: Sivert Øksnes Amland

3 August 2025 16	Vålerenga	2–1	Sandefjord	Oslo
17:00 CEST (UTC+2)	Grundetjern 53'; Sørensen 81'	Report	Cheng (yellow card) 83'; Mettler 90+3' (pen.); Pedersen (yellow card) 90+4'	Stadium: Intility Arena; Attendance: 10,398; Referee: Rohit Saggi

17 August 2025 18	Vålerenga	4–0	Sarpsborg 08	Oslo
19:15 CEST (UTC+2)	Sørensen 18', 42'; Ambina (yellow card) 50'; Vinícius 75'; Ofkir 77'	Report	Koch (yellow card) 46'; Ødegaard (yellow card) 74'	Stadium: Intility Arena; Attendance: 9,638; Referee: Mathias Støfringshaug

24 August 2025 19	Haugesund	2–3	Vålerenga	Haugesund
14:30 CEST (UTC+2)	Kukleci 11'; Rohd (yellow card) 27'; Niyukuri 57'; Grindhaug (yellow card) 77'; Alvsaker (yellow card) 90+1'	Report	Hagen 33' (pen.), (yellow card) 50'; Bjørdal (yellow card) 66'; Sørensen 68', 71'	Stadium: Haugesund Sparebank Arena; Attendance: 3,626; Referee: Mohammad Usman Aslam

30 August 2025 20	Vålerenga	3–2	Bryne	Oslo
18:00 CEST (UTC+2)	Bjørdal 3'; Sørensen 8' (pen.); Thorvaldsen 29'; Vinícius (yellow card) 45+1'; Ambina (yellow card) 50'	Report	Thornes 45+7'; Åsen Larsen (penalty missed) 52', 52'; Håland (yellow card) 57'; Sødal (yellow card) 79'	Stadium: Intility Arena; Attendance: 0 Referee: Christian Moen

13 September 2025 21	Brann	3–2	Vålerenga	Bergen
18:00 CEST (UTC+2)	Mathisen 14'; Pallesen Knudsen (yellow card) 53'; Horn Myhre 57'; Magnússon 66', (yellow card) 67'; Sørensen (yellow card) 69'; Holm (yellow card) 72'	Report	Thorvaldsen 9', (yellow card) 9'; Sørensen 47'; Tshiembe (yellow card) 90'; Bjørdal (red card) 90+3'	Stadium: Brann Stadion; Attendance: 17,176; Referee: Rohit Saggi

20 September 2025 22	Vålerenga	1–1	KFUM	Oslo
18:00 CEST (UTC+2)	Vinícius (yellow card) 61'; Hedvall (yellow card) 62'; Thorvaldsen 90+8'	Report	Sandal (yellow card) 34', (goal) 63' (pen.); M. Njie (yellow card) 56'; B. Njie (yellow card) 57'; Hjorth (yellow card) 66'	Stadium: Intility Arena; Attendance: 13,479; Referee: Sigurd Smehus Kringstad

28 September 2025 23	Molde	4–1	Vålerenga	Molde
19:15 CEST (UTC+2)	Hestad 12'; Eikrem 45+5'; Abdullai 52'; Stenevik 87' (pen.); Kasanwirjo (yellow card) 88'	Report	Ambina 36'; Tshiembe (yellow card) 88'	Stadium: Aker Stadion; Attendance: 5,763; Referee: Marius Lien

4 October 2025 24	Vålerenga	1–0	Tromsø	Oslo
14:00 CEST (UTC+2)	Hedvall (yellow card) 63'; Strand (yellow card) 70'; Lange (yellow card) 75'; Sjåtil (yellow card) 77'; Meliga (yellow card) 80'; Ofkir 88'	Report	Cornic (yellow card) 90+2'	Stadium: Intility Arena; Attendance: 8,423; Referee: Daniel Higraff

19 October 2025 25	HamKam	2–1	Vålerenga	Hamar
17:00 CEST (UTC+2)	Strand Nilsen (yellow card) 8'; Lien 22'; Osnes-Ringen (yellow card) 41'; Ekeroth (yellow card) 52'; Ibrahimaj 77'	Report	Grundetjern 59'; Ambina (yellow card) 82'	Stadium: Briskeby; Attendance: 5,313; Referee: Svein Tore Sinnes

26 October 2025 26	Vålerenga	2–1	Strømsgodset	Oslo
19:15 CET (UTC+1)	Hagen 90+1'; Kiil Olsen 90+7'	Report	Taaje 29', (yellow card) 41'; Bakke (yellow card) 45+2'; Valsvik (yellow card) 69'	Stadium: Intility Arena; Attendance: 8,076; Referee: Marius Hansen Grøtta

1 November 2025 27	Vålerenga	3–1	Bodø/Glimt	Oslo
16:00 CET (UTC+1)	Bjørdal 32'; Strand 45+1'; Grundetjern 47'	Report	Auklend 64'; Hauge (yellow card) 64'	Stadium: Intility Arena; Attendance: 14,221; Referee: Sigurd Smehus Kringstad

9 November 2025 28	Rosenborg	1–0	Vålerenga	Trondheim
14:30 CET (UTC+1)	E. Ceide (yellow card) 40'; Fossum 86' Tangvik (yellow card) 90+6'	Report	Ambina (red card) 35'; Bjørdal (yellow card) 45+2'; Hedvall (yellow card) 77'; Hagen (yellow card) 90+3'	Stadium: Lerkendal Stadion; Attendance: 12,121; Referee: Kristoffer Hagenes

22 November 2025 29	Vålerenga	3–0 (Awarded)	Kristiansund	Oslo
16:00 CET (UTC+1)	Pallas (yellow card) 44'; Bjørdal (red card) 57'; Kiil Olsen (yellow card) 67'; Meliga 84'; Strand 86', 90'	Report	Isah 23'; Ødegård 64', 70'	Stadium: Intility Arena; Attendance: 8,215; Referee: Daniel Higraff
Note: The match was originally ended 3–3, but during the first half it was discovered that Kristiansund's player Leander Næss Alvheim should have been suspended for the match after four yellow cards. Vålerenga lodged a protest after the match, which was upheld by the NFF's Adjudication and Sanctions Committee, which decided to overturn the result to 3-0 and Vålerenga was awarded three points.

30 November 2025 30	Viking	5–1	Vålerenga	Stavanger
17:00 CET (UTC+1)	Austbø 10'; Roseth 15'; Tripic 45+4' (pen.); Haugen 54'; Askildsen 72'; Bell (yellow card) 75'	Report	Strand (yellow card) 24'; Sjåtil (yellow card) 45+4'; Hagen 50'; Meliga (yellow card) 83'	Stadium: Lyse Arena; Attendance: 15,900; Referee: Tore Hansen

=== Norwegian Football Cup ===
==== 2025 ====
13 April 2025 First round	Gamle Oslo	1–1 (a.e.t.) (3–1 p)	Vålerenga	Oslo
16:00 CEST (UTC+2)	Wielens 72', (yellow card) 86'; Nguen (yellow card) 78' (yellow-red card) 89'; Sowe (yellow card) 80'; Telle (yellow card) 82'; Synstelien (yellow card) 103'; Tavakoli (yellow card) 105'	Report; Penalties	Hagen 43' (pen.); Sjøvold (yellow card) 58'; Sørensen (yellow card) 78'; Riisnæs (yellow card) 81'; Kiil Olsen (yellow card) 99'; Rijks (yellow card) 117'	Stadium: Vallhall Arena; Attendance: 1,350; Referee: Herman Holthe
	Penalties
	Tavakoli (penalty scored); Furu (penalty scored); Telle (penalty missed); Sowe (penalty scored)		(penalty missed) Hagen; (penalty missed) Sørensen; (penalty scored) Brajanac; (penalty missed) Bjørdal

==== 2025–26 ====
23 September 2025 Third round	Vålerenga	1–2	Fredrikstad	Oslo
18:00 CEST (UTC+2)	Tshiembe (yellow card) 90+7'; Strand 90+7'	Report	Eid 20'; Bjartalíð (yellow card) 82'; Rafn (yellow card) 90'; Owusu (yellow card) 90+6'; Skogvold 90+8'	Stadium: Intility Arena; Attendance: 6,540; Referee: Sivert Øksnes Amland
