= 2022 Vålerenga Fotball season =

Vålerenga
2022 season
- Chairman: Thomas Baardseng
- Head coach: Dag-Eilev Fagermo
- Stadium: Intility Arena
- Eliteserien: 6th
- Norwegian Cup: Third round
- Top goalscorer: League: Amor Layouni (8); All: Amor Layouni (8)
Home colours	Away colours	Third colours

The 2022 season was Vålerenga Fotball's 109th season in existence and the club's 21st consecutive season in the top flight of Norwegian football. In addition to the domestic league, Vålerenga Fotball participated in this season's edition of the Norwegian Football Cup.

== Players ==
=== First-team squad ===
As of 31 August 2022

Note: Flags indicate national team as defined under FIFA eligibility rules; some limited exceptions apply. Players may hold more than one non-FIFA nationality.

No.	Pos.	Nation	Player
1	GK	NOR	Sondre Rossbach (on loan from Odd)
2	DF	NOR	Christian Borchgrevink
4	DF	NOR	Jonatan Tollås (Captain)
5	DF	MKD	Leonard Zuta
6	DF	NOR	Vegar Eggen Hedenstad
7	MF	NOR	Fredrik Oldrup Jensen
8	MF	NOR	Henrik Bjørdal
9	FW	NOR	Torgeir Børven
10	FW	NOR	Osame Sahraoui
11	FW	TUN	Amor Layouni
14	FW	NOR	Henrik Udahl
15	MF	NOR	Odin Thiago Holm
16	MF	NOR	Mathias Johnsrud Emilsen

No.	Pos.	Nation	Player
17	FW	NOR	Tobias Christensen
18	DF	NOR	Simen Juklerød
19	FW	NOR	Seedy Jatta
20	MF	NOR	Magnus Bech Riisnæs
21	GK	NOR	Magnus Smelhus Sjøeng
23	DF	ISL	Brynjar Ingi Bjarnason
24	MF	NOR	Petter Strand
27	FW	NOR	Jacob Eng
30	GK	NOR	Storm Strand-Kolbjörnsen
31	DF	NOR	Alexander Hammer Kjelsen
33	DF	NOR	Jones El-Abdellaoui
44	DF	NOR	Stefan Strandberg
—	MF	NOR	Stian Sjövold Thorstensen

== Transfers ==
=== Winter ===
In: Note: Flags indicate national team as defined under FIFA eligibility rules; some limited exceptions apply. Players may hold more than one non-FIFA nationality.

No.	Pos.	Nation	Player
6	DF	NOR	Vegar Eggen Hedenstad (from (Turkey) Fatih Karagümrük)
18	FW	NGR	Taofeek Ismaheel (on loan from (France) Lorient)
23	DF	ISL	Brynjar Ingi Bjarnason (from (Italy) Lecce)
24	MF	NOR	Petter Strand (from Brann)
26	FW	NOR	Aron Dønnum (on loan from (Belgium) Standard Liège)
30	GK	NOR	Storm Strand-Kolbjørnsen (promoted from junior team)

Out: Note: Flags indicate national team as defined under FIFA eligibility rules; some limited exceptions apply. Players may hold more than one non-FIFA nationality.

No.	Pos.	Nation	Player
6	MF	DEN	Nicolaj Thomsen (to (Denmark) SønderjyskE)
10	FW	SWE	Albin Mörfelt (on loan to (Sweden) Mjällby)
18	DF	NOR	Fredrik Holmé (to Kongsvinger)
21	GK	NOR	Mathias Dyngeland (loan return to (Sweden) Elfsborg)
29	DF	NOR	Oskar Opsahl (to Tromsø)
–	FW	GUI	Ousmane Camara (to (Georgia (country)) Dila Gori, previously on loan)

=== Summer ===
In: Note: Flags indicate national team as defined under FIFA eligibility rules; some limited exceptions apply. Players may hold more than one non-FIFA nationality.

No.	Pos.	Nation	Player
1	GK	NOR	Per Kristian Bråtveit (from (Sweden) Djurgården)
1	GK	NOR	Sondre Rossbach (on loan from Odd)
9	FW	NOR	Torgeir Børven (from (Turkey) Gaziantep)
31	DF	NOR	Alexander Hammer Kjelsen (promoted from junior squad)
32	DF	NOR	Max Bjurstrøm (promoted from junior squad)
33	MF	NOR	Jones El-Abdellaoui (promoted from junior squad)
44	DF	NOR	Stefan Strandberg (from (Italy) Salernitana)

Out: Note: Flags indicate national team as defined under FIFA eligibility rules; some limited exceptions apply. Players may hold more than one non-FIFA nationality.

No.	Pos.	Nation	Player
1	GK	NOR	Kjetil Haug (to (France) Toulouse)
1	GK	NOR	Per Kristian Bråtveit (to (Denmark) AGF)
3	DF	NOR	Brage Skaret (to Fredrikstad)
9	FW	ISL	Viðar Örn Kjartansson (to (Greece) Atromitos)
10	MF	SWE	Albin Mörfelt (to (Sweden) Degerfors, previously on loan at (Sweden) Mjällby)
18	FW	NGR	Taofeek Ismaheel (loan return to (France) Lorient)
22	DF	NOR	Ivan Näsberg (to (Greece) PAOK)
26	FW	NOR	Aron Dønnum (loan return to (Belgium) Standard Liège)

== Competitions ==
=== Eliteserien ===
==== Results summary ====
Overall								Home						Away					
Pld	W	D	L	GF	GA	GD	Pts	W	D	L	GF	GA	GD	W	D	L	GF	GA	GD
30	13	5	12	52	49	+3	44	9	2	4	31	21	+10	4	3	8	21	28	−7

Last updated: 13 November 2022.

==== Results by round ====
Round	1	2	3	4	5	6	7	8	9	10	11	12	13	14	15	16	17	18	19	20	21	22	23	24	25	26	27	28	29	30
Ground	A	H	A	H	A	H	A	A	H	A	H	A	H	A	H	A	H	A	H	A	H	A	H	H	A	H	A	H	A	H
Result	L	W	L	W	W	D	L	L	L	D	L	L	W	W	W	W	W	D	W	W	W	L	W	W	L	L	L	D	D	L
Position	11	9	14	10	4	5	9	9	11	12	14	14	13	13	10	6	6	6	5	5	5	5	5	5	5	5	5	5	5	6

A = Away; H = Home; W = Win; D = Draw; L = Loss

==== Results ====
2 April 2022 1	Molde	1–0	Vålerenga	Molde
18:00 CEST (UTC+2)	Linnes 57'	Report	Dønnum (yellow card) 45' (yellow-red card) 90+1'; Tollås Nation (yellow card) 86'	Stadium: Aker Stadion; Attendance: 6,235; Referee: Kristoffer Hagenes

10 April 2022 2	Vålerenga	2–1	Haugesund	Oslo
18:00 CEST (UTC+2)	Kjartansson 1', 5'	Report	Naustdal (yellow card) 17'; Zafeiris (yellow card) 23'; Therkildsen 43'	Stadium: Intility Arena; Attendance: 6,680; Referee: Mohammad Usman Aslam

18 April 2022 3	Bodø/Glimt	5–1	Vålerenga	Bodø
20:00 CEST (UTC+2)	Solbakken 36'; Saltnes 41'; Høibråten (yellow card) 61'; Espejord 62'; Vetlesen 71', 78', (yellow card) 73'	Report	Bjørdal 86' (pen.)	Stadium: Aspmyra Stadion; Attendance: 4,934; Referee: Rohit Saggi

24 April 2022 4	Vålerenga	1–0	Jerv	Oslo
18:00 CEST (UTC+2)	Bjørdal (yellow card) 35'; Norheim 82' (o.g.)	Report	Furtado (yellow card) 8'; Wichmann (yellow card) 20'	Stadium: Intility Arena; Attendance: 6,873; Referee: Marius Hansen Grøtta

8 May 2022 5	Sandefjord	1–3	Vålerenga	Sandefjord
18:00 CEST (UTC+2)	Risan Mørk (yellow card) 19'; Kurtovic (yellow card) 45'; Haakenstad (yellow card) 67'; Ruud Tveter 74'	Report	Taaje 9' (o.g.); Dønnum 32'; Kjartansson 51'; Christensen (yellow card) 83'	Stadium: Release Arena; Attendance: 4,058; Referee: Tore Hansen

12 May 2022 12	Tromsø	1–0	Vålerenga	Tromsø
19:00 CEST (UTC+2)	Nilsen (yellow card) 13'; Kitolano 67'; Haugaard (yellow card) 90+3'	Report		Stadium: Alfheim Stadion; Attendance: 2,033; Referee: Svein Tore Sinnes

16 May 2022 6	Vålerenga	1–1	HamKam	Oslo
20:00 CEST (UTC+2)	Zuta 75'	Report	Kongsro (yellow card) 44'; Enkerud 56'	Stadium: Intility Arena; Attendance: 14,357; Referee: Sivert Øksnes Amland

22 May 2022 7	Strømsgodset	3–2	Vålerenga	Drammen
18:00 CEST (UTC+2)	Hove 33'; Salvesen 35'; Vilsvik 37'	Report	Kjartansson 52'; Dønnum 67', (yellow card) 72'	Stadium: Marienlyst Stadion; Attendance: 5,053; Referee: Marius Lien

25 May 2022 8	Lillestrøm	2–0	Vålerenga	Lillestrøm
20:00 CEST (UTC+2)	Pettersson 63'; Garnås 80'	Report	Holm (yellow card) 68'; Zuta (yellow card) 84'	Stadium: Åråsen Stadion; Attendance: 10,527; Referee: Rohit Saggi

29 May 2022 9	Vålerenga	0–4	Rosenborg	Oslo
20:00 CEST (UTC+2)	Bjørdal (yellow card) 25'; Tollås Nation (yellow card) 40'; Dønnum (yellow card) 73'	Report	Sæter 8', 49'; Jensen (yellow card) 13'; Vecchia 22'; Pereira 68', (yellow card) 73'; Rogers (yellow card) 73'	Stadium: Intility Arena; Attendance: 10,156; Referee: Tore Hansen

19 June 2022 10	Aalesund	2–2	Vålerenga	Ålesund
20:00 CEST (UTC+2)	Hauso Haugen 37'; Kallevåg 67'; Rafn (yellow card) 90+2'	Report	Hedenstad (yellow card) 42'; Dicko Eng 82'; Näsberg 85'; Strand (yellow card) 90+2'	Stadium: Color Line Stadion; Attendance: 6,761; Referee: Kristoffer Hagenes

26 June 2022 11	Vålerenga	0–1	Odd	Oslo
20:00 CEST (UTC+2)	Sahraoui (yellow card) 90+3'	Report	Lauritsen 60'	Stadium: Intility Arena; Attendance: 6,685; Referee: Christian Moen

10 July 2022 13	Vålerenga	3–0	Kristiansund	Oslo
18:00 CEST (UTC+2)	Oldrup Jensen (yellow card) 39'; Udahl 47', 80'; Layouni 54'	Report		Stadium: Intility Arena; Attendance: 5,520; Referee: Marius Lien

17 July 2022 14	Sarpsborg 08	0–1	Vålerenga	Sarpsborg
18:00 CEST (UTC+2)		Report	Layouni 30'	Stadium: Sarpsborg Stadion; Attendance: 5,019; Referee: Marius Hansen Grøtta

24 July 2022 15	Vålerenga	4–2	Viking	Oslo
18:00 CEST (UTC+2)	Sahraoui 28'; Bjørdal 32' (pen.), 40', (yellow card) 79'; Hedenstad (yellow card) 57'; Tollås Nation (yellow card) 59'; Christensen 90+8'	Report	Solbakken 11', (yellow card) 44'; Vikstøl (yellow card) 50'; Friðjónsson (yellow card) 59'; Nilsen Tangen (yellow card) 64'; Vevatne 82'	Stadium: Intility Arena; Attendance: 6,432; Referee: Tom Harald Hagen

30 July 2022 16	Jerv	2–5	Vålerenga	Grimstad
20:00 CEST (UTC+2)	Ugland 27'; Norheim (yellow card) 38'; Hustad (yellow card) 43'; Şimşir 71', (yellow card) 90+6'; Furtado (yellow card) 75'	Report	Tollås Nation 9'; Bjørdal (yellow card) 29', (goal) 39' (pen.); Layouni 34' (pen.); Wichmann 58' (o.g.); Oldrup Jensen (yellow card) 70'; Dicko Eng 90+4'; Holm (yellow card) 90+5'	Stadium: J.J. Ugland Stadion – Levermyr; Attendance: 2,914; Referee: Mohammad Usman Aslam

7 August 2022 17	Vålerenga	4–0	Aalesund	Oslo
20:00 CEST (UTC+2)	Holm 60'; Sahraoui 62'; Udahl 70'; Jatta 90+1'	Report	Hopland (yellow card) 57'; Kallevåg (yellow card) 75'	Stadium: Intility Arena; Attendance: 7,845; Referee: Rohit Saggi

14 August 2022 18	HamKam	1–1	Vålerenga	Hamar
20:00 CEST (UTC+2)	Onsrud (yellow card) 6'; Hernandez-Foster (yellow card) 68'; Bjørlo (yellow card) 82'; Faerrón (yellow card) 87'; Sjølstad (yellow card) 88'; Faraas 90+3'	Report	Udahl 45+3'; Hedenstad (yellow card) 72'	Stadium: Briskeby Stadion; Attendance: 5,492; Referee: Tore Hansen

21 August 2022 19	Vålerenga	1–0	Tromsø	Oslo
18:00 CEST (UTC+2)	Layouni (yellow card) 35'; Strandberg 81'	Report	Vesterlund (yellow card) 35'; Antonsen (yellow card) 51'; Gundersen (yellow card) 59'	Stadium: Intility Arena; Attendance: 7,784; Referee: Christian Moen

28 August 2022 20	Viking	1–2	Vålerenga	Stavanger
18:00 CEST (UTC+2)	Vevatne (yellow card) 17'; Austbø 70', (yellow card) 74'; Traore (yellow card) 77'; Gunnarsson (yellow card) 90+8'	Report	Hedenstad (yellow card) 20'; Sahraoui 35', 55'; Sjøeng (yellow card) 89'	Stadium: Viking Stadion; Attendance: 9,244; Referee: Kristoffer Hagenes

4 September 2022 21	Vålerenga	3–1	Lillestrøm	Oslo
20:00 CEST (UTC+2)	Sahraoui 22', 71'; Børven 45+1'	Report	Garnås (yellow card) 14', (goal) 51'; Rösler (yellow card) 70'	Stadium: Intility Arena; Attendance: 16,555; Referee: Svein Oddvar Moen

11 September 2022 22	Kristiansund	3–2	Vålerenga	Kristiansund
18:00 CEST (UTC+2)	Willumsson 8'; Pemi 63', (yellow card) 90+4'; Strand Nilsen (yellow card) 85'; Diop 90+4'	Report	Holm 2', (yellow card) 40'; Oldrup Jensen (yellow card) 67'; Zuta 73'; Hedenstad (yellow card) 84'; Christensen (yellow card) 90+3'	Stadium: Kristiansund Stadion; Attendance: 3,653; Referee: Tore Hansen

18 September 2022 23	Vålerenga	4–0	Sandefjord	Oslo
18:00 CEST (UTC+2)	Christensen (yellow card) 32', (goal) 79'; Layouni 36'; Layouni 45+2'; Dicko Eng 84'	Report	Winbo (yellow card) 81'	Stadium: Intility Arena; Attendance: 9,252; Referee: Mohammad Usman Aslam

1 October 2022 24	Vålerenga	4–0	Strømsgodset	Oslo
18:00 CEST (UTC+2)	Børven 17', 19'; Layouni 30', 43'	Report	Gunnarsson (yellow card) 37'; Therkelsen (yellow card) 85'	Stadium: Intility Arena; Attendance: 7,545; Referee: Marius Hansen Grøtta

9 October 2022 25	Rosenborg	3–0	Vålerenga	Trondheim
19:00 CEST (UTC+2)	Tengstedt 16'; Jensen 31', 74'	Report	Juklerød (yellow card) 44'	Stadium: Lerkendal Stadion; Attendance: 13,044; Referee: Svein Oddvar Moen

16 October 2022 26	Vålerenga	0–6	Bodø/Glimt	Oslo
17:00 CEST (UTC+2)	Sjøeng (red card) 14'; Layouni (yellow card) 78'	Report	Espejord 18'; Pellegrino 32', 39'; Høibråten (yellow card) 36'; Solbakken 60'; Berg 64'; Grønbæk 79'	Stadium: Intility Arena; Attendance: 10,366; Referee: Rohit Saggi

22 October 2022 27	Odd	2–1	Vålerenga	Skien
18:00 CEST (UTC+2)	Gjengaar 28'; Wallem 70'; Ruud (yellow card) 82'; Jørgensen (yellow card) 88'; Jevtović (yellow card) 90+2'	Report	Sahraoui (yellow card) 49'; Jatta (yellow card) 78'; Dicko Eng 87'	Stadium: Skagerak Arena; Attendance: 5,279; Referee: Sivert Øksnes Amland

29 October 2022 28	Vålerenga	3–3	Sarpsborg 08	Oslo
18:00 CEST (UTC+2)	Hedenstad 19'; Christensen (yellow card) 25'; Layouni 45+2'; Hedenstad 66'	Report	Tibbling 4'; Maigaard 17'; Salétros (yellow card) 46'; Molins (yellow card) 56', (goal) 68'	Stadium: Intility Arena; Attendance: 5,989; Referee: Tom Harald Hagen

6 November 2022 29	Haugesund	1–1	Vålerenga	Haugesund
17:00 CET (UTC+1)	Christensen (yellow card) 37'; Pedersen (yellow card) 63'; Leite 88'; Krygård (yellow card) 90+2'	Report	Børven 60'; Hedenstad (yellow card) 72'	Stadium: Haugesund Stadion; Attendance: 4,418; Referee: Svein Tore Sinnes

13 November 2022 30	Vålerenga	1–2	Molde	Oslo
17:00 CET (UTC+1)	Børven 11'; Bjørdal (yellow card) 37'; Oldrup Jensen (yellow card) 48'	Report	Brynhildsen 80'; Fofana 83' (pen.)	Stadium: Intility Arena; Attendance: 8,005; Referee: Kai Erik Steen

==== Table ====
Pos	Team	Pld	W	D	L	GF	GA	GD	Pts
4	Lillestrøm	30	16	5	9	49	34	+15	53
5	Odd	30	13	6	11	43	45	−2	45
6	Vålerenga	30	13	5	12	52	49	+3	44
7	Tromsø	30	10	13	7	46	49	−3	43
8	Sarpsborg 08	30	12	5	13	57	54	+3	41

Source: Football Association of Norway (in Norwegian)
Rules for classification: 1) Points; 2) Goal difference; 3) Goals scored; 4) Head-to-head points; 5) Head-to-head goal difference; 6) Head-to-head goals scored.

=== Norwegian Football Cup ===
19 May 2022 First round	Kolbu/KK	1–5	Vålerenga	Østre Toten
18:00 CEST (UTC+2)	Sønsteby 62'	Report	Dønnum 3' (pen.); Udahl 22'; Jatta 51', 60'; Ismaheel 84'	Stadium: Kolbu Idrettsplass; Attendance: 1,750; Referee: Ali al Hatam

22 June 2022 Second round	Brumunddal	3–4	Vålerenga	Ringsaker
19:05 CEST (UTC+2)	Finstad 38'; Osmo 44'; Frankmo 82'	Report	Udahl 46'; Dønnum (yellow card) 75', (goal) 90', 90+1'; Zuta 75'	Stadium: SH-Banen; Attendance: 1,601; Referee: Anders Bodding

29 June 2022 Third round	Vålerenga	0–1	Bodø/Glimt	Oslo
20:15 CEST (UTC+2)		Report	Solbakken (penalty missed) 84'; Saltnes 90'; Boniface (yellow card) 90+3'	Stadium: Intility Arena; Attendance: 3,097; Referee: Sivert Øksnes Amland
