= Magnus Sjøeng =

Norwegian football player (born 2002)

Magnus Smelhus Sjøeng
Personal information
- Full name: Magnus Smelhus Sjøeng
- Date of birth: 6 June 2002 (age 24)
- Height: 1.97 m (6 ft 6 in)
- Position: Goalkeeper

Team information
- Current team: Start (on loan from Vålerenga)
- Number: 26

Youth career
- –2015: Skeid
- 2016–2021: Vålerenga

Senior career*
| Years | Team | Apps | (Gls) |
| 2020–2025 | Vålerenga 2 | 30 | (0) |
| 2021– | Vålerenga | 75 | (0) |
| 2025 | → Stabæk (loan) | 17 | (1) |
| 2026– | → Start (loan) | 3 | (0) |

International career
| 2021 | Norway U19 | 1 | (0) |
| 2021 | Norway U20 | 2 | (0) |
| 2022–2024 | Norway U21 | 7 | (0) |
- * Club domestic league appearances and goals as of 19 October 2026

Magnus Smelhus Sjøeng (born 23 March 2002) is a Norwegian professional footballer who plays as a goalkeeper for Eliteserien club Start, on loan from Vålerenga.

== Club career ==
Sjøeng became Vålerenga's reserve goalkeeper after Kristoffer Klaesson was sold in 2021. He made his debut for the Vålerenga first team on 29 June 2022 against FK Bodø/Glimt in the 2022 Norwegian Football Cup after first choice goalkeeper Kjetil Haug was signed by Toulouse during the European summer transfer window. He made his Eliteserien debut the following match on 10 July 2022 in a 3–0 victory against Kristiansund BK at the Intility Arena.

On 23 July 2025, Sjøeng was loaned out to Stabæk. On 13 September 2025, he scored a goal in a 1–1 draw against Egersund to secure a point for Stabæk.

On 18 September 2026, Sjøeng joined Start on loan from Vålerenga for the remainder of the 2026 season.

== International career ==
Sjøeng was capped on U19 and U20 level in 2021. He was called up to the Norwegian under-21 squad for the first time in May 2022.

== Career statistics ==
As of match played 18 October 2026

Appearances and goals by club, season and competition
| Club | Season | League | | | Norwegian Cup | | Other | | Total | |
| Club | Season | Division | Apps | Goals | Apps | Goals | Apps | Goals | Apps | Goals |
|---|---|---|---|---|---|---|---|---|---|---|
| Vålerenga 2 | 2020 | 2. divisjon | 1 | 0 | — | | — | | 1 | 0 |
| Vålerenga 2 | 2021 | 2. divisjon | 11 | 0 | — | | — | | 11 | 0 |
| Vålerenga 2 | 2022 | 2. divisjon | 9 | 0 | — | | — | | 9 | 0 |
| Vålerenga 2 | 2023 | 2. divisjon | 8 | 0 | — | | — | | 8 | 0 |
| Vålerenga 2 | 2025 | 3. divisjon | 1 | 0 | — | | — | | 1 | 0 |
| Vålerenga 2 | Total | | 30 | 0 | — | | — | | 30 | 0 |
| Vålerenga | 2022 | Eliteserien | 17 | 0 | 1 | 0 | — | | 18 | 0 |
| Vålerenga | 2023 | Eliteserien | 19 | 0 | 0 | 0 | 2 (Note: Appearances in Eliteserien play-offs) | 0 | 21 | 0 |
| Vålerenga | 2024 | 1. divisjon | 30 | 0 | 1 | 0 | — | | 31 | 0 |
| Vålerenga | 2025 | Eliteserien | 9 | 0 | 0 | 0 | — | | 9 | 0 |
| Vålerenga | 2026 | Eliteserien | 0 | 0 | 0 | 0 | — | | 0 | 0 |
| Vålerenga | Total | | 75 | 0 | 2 | 0 | 2 | 0 | 79 | 0 |
| Stabæk (loan) | 2025 | 1. divisjon | 17 | 1 | 1 | 0 | 0 | 0 | 18 | 1 |
| Start (loan) | 2026 | Eliteserien | 3 | 0 | 0 | 0 | 0 | 0 | 3 | 0 |
| Career total | | | 125 | 1 | 3 | 0 | 2 | 0 | 130 | 1 |

== Honours ==
Individual

- Eliteserien Young Player of the Month: November 2023
