= 2024 Halmstads BK season =

Halmstads BK
2024 season
- Manager: Magnus Haglund
- Stadium: Örjans Vall
- Allsvenskan: Pre-season
- 2023–24 Svenska Cupen: Semi-finals
- 2024–25 Svenska Cupen: Pre-season
- Biggest defeat: Halmstads BK 0–4 Malmö FF

The 2024 season is the 110th season in the history of Halmstads BK and the second consecutive season of its presence in the Allsvenskan.

== Transfers ==
=== In ===
Pos.	Player	Transferred from	Fee	Date	Source
DF	(Brazil) Vinícius Nogueira	(Sweden) Varbergs BoIS	Undisclosed	1 February 2024	
FW	(Sweden) Rasmus Wiedesheim-Paul	(Norway) Rosenborg BK	€130,000	14 February 2024	
MF	(Iceland) Birnir Snær Ingason	(Iceland) Víkingur	Free	16 February 2024	
MF	(Iceland) Gísli Eyjólfsson	(Iceland) Breiðablik	Free	16 February 2024	

=== Out ===
Pos.	Player	Transferred to	Fee	Date	Source
FW	(Sweden) Erik Ahlstrand	(Germany) FC St. Pauli	Undisclosed	27 January 2024	
GK	(Sweden) Malkolm Nilsson Säfqvist	(Sweden) Djurgården	Free	1 February 2024	

== Pre-season and friendlies ==
26 January 2024 Friendly	IFK Göteborg (Sweden)	0–1	(Sweden) Halmstads BK
18:00

30 January 2024 Friendly	Halmstads BK (Sweden)	2–0	(Sweden) Utsiktens BK
16:00

5 February 2024 Friendly	Halmstads BK (Sweden)	0–1	(Denmark) Randers FC	La Nucía, Spain
14:00				Stadium: Campo 2 La Nucía

10 February 2024 Friendly	Halmstads BK (Sweden)	0–1	(Denmark) SønderjyskE	Benidorm, Spain
15:00			Coulibaly 50'	Stadium: Melia Villaitana Football Center

22 March 2024 Friendly	IF Elfsborg (Sweden)	4–0	(Sweden) Halmstads BK	Borås
18:00	Söderberg 7'; Zeneli 21' (pen.); Frick 59'; Qasem 64'		(red card) 81'	Stadium: Borås Arena

== Competitions ==
=== Overall record ===
Competition	First match	Last match	Starting round	Final position	Record							
Competition	First match	Last match	Starting round	Final position	Pld	W	D	L	GF	GA	GD	Win %
Allsvenskan	1 April 2024	November 2024	Matchday 1		0	0	0	0	0	0	+0	—
2023–24 Svenska Cupen	18 February 2024	16 March 2024	Group stage	Semi-finals	5	2	2	1	6	7	−1	40.00
2024–25 Svenska Cupen	TBD		TBD		0	0	0	0	0	0	+0	—
Total					5	2	2	1	6	7	−1	40.00

Last updated: 16 March 2024
Source: Soccerway

=== Allsvenskan ===
==== League table ====
Pos	Team	Pld	W	D	L	GF	GA	GD	Pts	Qualification or relegation
10	IF Brommapojkarna	30	8	10	12	46	53	−7	34	
11	IFK Norrköping	30	9	7	14	36	57	−21	34	
12	Halmstads BK	30	10	3	17	32	50	−18	33	
13	IFK Göteborg	30	7	10	13	33	43	−10	31	
14	IFK Värnamo (O)	30	7	10	13	30	40	−10	31	Qualification for the Allsvenskan play-off

Source: svenskfotboll.se (in Swedish)
Rules for classification: 1) Points; 2) Goal difference; 3) Goals scored; 4) Head-to-head points; 5) Head-to-head goal difference; 6) Head-to-head away goals scored; 7) Play-off
(Note: Play-off is only played if need to decide champion, teams for relegation or UEFA competition and will be played on a neutral ground).
(O) Play-off winners

==== Results summary ====
Overall								Home						Away					
Pld	W	D	L	GF	GA	GD	Pts	W	D	L	GF	GA	GD	W	D	L	GF	GA	GD
0	0	0	0	0	0	0	0	0	0	0	0	0	0	0	0	0	0	0	0

Last updated: April 2024.

==== Results by round ====
Round	1
Ground	A
Result	
Position	

A = Away; H = Home; W = Win; D = Draw; L = Loss

==== Matches ====
1 April 2024 1	Sirius	v	Halmstads BK	Uppsala
14:00 CEST (UTC+2)				Stadium: Studenternas IP

=== 2023–24 Svenska Cupen ===
Pos	Team	Pld	W	D	L	GF	GA	GD	Pts	Qualification	HBK	IFKV	TFF	HIF
1	Halmstads BK	3	2	1	0	5	3	+2	7	Advance to Knockout stage			1–1	3–2
2	IFK Värnamo	3	2	0	1	3	1	+2	6		0–1		2–0	
3	Trelleborgs FF	3	1	1	1	3	4	−1	4					2–1
4	Helsingborgs IF	3	0	0	3	3	6	−3	0			0–1		

Source: SvFF
Rules for classification: 1) Points; 2) Goal difference; 3) Goals scored; 4) Head-to-head record; 5) Lowest disciplinary points; 6) Highest ranked team

==== Group stage ====
18 February 2024 1	Halmstads BK	3–2	Helsingborgs IF	Halmstad
13:00 CET (UTC+1)	Mohammed 23', 61'; Ofosu-Ayeh (yellow card) 60'; Ahlstrand (yellow card) 65'; Allansson (yellow card) 70'; Al-Ammari (yellow card) 90', (goal) 90'		Silverholt 30'; Acquah (yellow card) 65' (yellow-red card) 89'; Muhsin 77'; Loeper (yellow card) 90+2'	Stadium: Örjans Vall; Referee: Magnus Lindgren

25 February 2024 2	Halmstads BK	1–1	Trelleborgs FF	Halmstad
13:00 CET (UTC+1)	Eyjólfsson 76'		Culum 49'; Asani (yellow card) 75'; Wendt (yellow card) 80'	Stadium: Örjans Vall; Referee: Oscar Johnson

2 March 2024 3	IFK Värnamo	0–1	Halmstads BK	Värnamo
13:00 CET (UTC+1)	Bustos (yellow card) 82'; Thern (yellow card) 90+8'		Granath 43'; Al-Ammari (yellow card) 63'; Mohammed (yellow card) 87'; Baffoe (yellow card) 90+6'; Svedberg (yellow card) 90+7'	Stadium: Ljusseveka 8 Värnamo; Referee: Granit Maqedonci

==== Knockout stage ====
9 March 2024 Quarter-finals	IF Brommapojkarna	0–1 (a.e.t.)	Halmstads BK	Vällingby
13:00 CET (UTC+1)	Calisir (yellow card) 41'; Björkander (yellow card) 53'; Vasić (yellow card) 71'; Pichkah (yellow card) 81' (yellow-red card) 109'; Irandust (yellow card) 113'		Baffoe (yellow card) 71'; Nogueira (yellow card) 76'; Al-Ammari (yellow card) 90+4'; Granath (yellow card) 97'; Ofosu-Ayeh 112'; Wallentin (yellow card) 117'	Stadium: Grimsta IP; Referee: Victor Wolf

16 March 2024 Semi-final	Halmstads BK	0–4	Malmö FF	Halmstad
15:00 CET (UTC+1)	Svedberg (yellow card) 22'		Botheim 50', 73'; Berg Johnsen 53'; Kiese Thelin (yellow card) 8', (goal) 70'	Stadium: Örjans Vall; Referee: Kristoffer Karlsson
