= Brice Ambina =

Cameroonian footballer

Personal information
- Full name: Fidel Brice Ambina
- Date of birth: 17 November 2001 (age 24)
- Position: Midfielder

Team information
- Current team: Vålerenga
- Number: 29

Senior career*
| Years | Team | Apps | (Gls) |
| 2017–2020 | Renaissance FC | | |
| 2022–2024 | Cape Town City | 50 | (0) |
| 2024 | → Vålerenga (loan) | 13 | (0) |
| 2024– | Vålerenga | 52 | (6) |

International career^{‡}
| 2021 | Cameroon U20 | 6 | (0) |
| 2026– | Cameroon | 1 | (0) |
- * Club domestic league appearances and goals as of 23 July 2026 ‡ National team caps and goals as of 17:35, 27 March 2026 (UTC)

Fidel Brice Ambina (born 17 November 2001) is a Cameroonian football player who plays as a midfielder for Vålerenga and the Cameroon national team.

== Career ==
Ambina started his senior career in Renaissance FC de Ngoumou, and played for Cameroon U20 in the 2021 U-20 Africa Cup of Nations. Ambina moved to South African soccer in February 2022, signing with Cape Town City for four and a half years.

In the summer of 2023, Cape Town City reportedly rejected a transfer bid from Riga FC. However, when the South African league had a winter break in 2024, Ambina was not present at its resumption since he was on trial abroad. Ambina was signed by Norwegian club Vålerenga on a loan until the summer of 2024. Manager Geir Bakke described Ambina as a "typical number six". Dagsavisen surmised that Ambina's holding role in the midfield could open more offensive room for Elias Hagen, Petter Strand or Henrik Bjørdal.

On 24 June 2024, Ambina joined Vålerenga Fotball on a permanent contract.

== International career ==
Ambina was called up to the Cameroon national team for a set of 2026 FIFA Series matches in March 2026.

== Career statistics ==
=== Club ===
As of match played 21 March 2026

Appearances and goals by club, season and competition
| Club | Season | League | | | National cup | | Continental | | Other | | Total | |
| Club | Season | Division | Apps | Goals | Apps | Goals | Apps | Goals | Apps | Goals | Apps | Goals |
|---|---|---|---|---|---|---|---|---|---|---|---|---|
| Cape Town City | 2021–22 | South African Premiership | 12 | 0 | — | | — | | — | | 12 | 0 |
| Cape Town City | 2022–23 | South African Premiership | 23 | 0 | 1 | 0 | 5 (Note: Three appearances in CAF Champions League, two appearances in CAF Confederations Cup) | 0 | 1 (Note: Appearance in MTN 8) | 0 | 30 | 0 |
| Cape Town City | 2023–24 | South African Premiership | 15 | 0 | 0 | 0 | — | | 1 | 0 | 16 | 0 |
| Cape Town City | Total | | 50 | 0 | 1 | 0 | 5 | 0 | 2 | 0 | 58 | 0 |
| Vålerenga (loan) | 2024 | Eliteserien | 13 | 0 | — | | — | | — | | 13 | 0 |
| Vålerenga | 2024 | Eliteserien | 15 | 2 | 5 | 0 | — | | — | | 20 | 2 |
| Vålerenga | 2025 | Eliteserien | 26 | 4 | 0 | 0 | — | | — | | 26 | 4 |
| Vålerenga | 2026 | Eliteserien | 1 | 0 | 0 | 0 | — | | — | | 1 | 0 |
| Vålerenga | Total | | 42 | 6 | 5 | 0 | — | | — | | 47 | 6 |
| Career total | | | 105 | 4 | 6 | 0 | 5 | 0 | 2 | 0 | 118 | 6 |

=== International ===
As of match played 27 March 2026

Appearances and goals by national team and year
| National team | Year | Apps | Goals |
|---|---|---|---|
| Cameroon | 2026 | 1 | 0 |
| Total | | 1 | 0 |
