= Vinícius Nogueira =

Brazilian footballer (born 2001)

- Nogueira with Orlando City in 2026

Personal information
- Full name: Vinícius Nogueira de Oliveira
- Date of birth: 11 December 2001 (age 24)
- Place of birth: Penápolis, Brazil
- Height: 1.80 m (5 ft 11 in)
- Position: Left-back

Team information
- Current team: Orlando City (on loan from Ludogorets Razgrad)
- Number: 27

Youth career
- 2015–2020: Palmeiras
- 2020–2021: Atlético Minero
- 2022: Ponte Preta

Senior career*
Years	Team	Apps	(Gls)
2023	Varbergs BoIS	20	(0)
2024–2025	Halmstad	29	(0)
2025	→ Vålerenga (loan)	25	(2)
2026–	Ludogorets Razgrad	18	(0)
2026–	→ Orlando City (loan)	7	(0)
- * Club domestic league appearances and goals as of 23:39, 7 November 2026 (UTC)

Vinícius Nogueira de Oliveira (born 11 December 2001) is a Brazilian professional footballer who plays as a left-back for Major League Soccer club Orlando City, on loan from Bulgarian First League club Ludogorets Razgrad.

== Club career ==
Nogueira played for the U23s of Associação Atlética Ponte Preta before moving to Europe in 2022, where he went on trial with Varbergs BoIS of the Allsvenskan. He was subsequently signed in January 2023. Nogueira played often, but also had injury problems during the late summertime, and was even hospitalized at one point. Varberg were relegated from the 2023 Allsvenskan, but Nogueira remained in the league as he was bought by Halmstads BK. He played well there, registering 8 assists, causing rumours to spread about transfer interest from IFK Göteborg, AIK, Djurgården and Hammarby.

In the 2024 Allsvenskan, Nogueira played 29 of the 30 matches for Halmstad. However, in early 2025 it surfaced that Nogueira did not have a work permit. The club should have applied for a renewed work permit upon the transfer from Varberg, and when they neglected to do so, Nogueira no longer had a work permit as the previous one expired. It followed that he was not even allowed residence in Sweden, and thus stayed in a hotel in Denmark. As he was now ineligible to play in Sweden, Nogueira had to find a new club and was loaned to Vålerenga in the Norwegian Eliteserien. Here he became a regular, and also scored his first senior goal in a victory over Kristiansund. His second came in a victory over Sarpsborg 08, dubbed "Brazilian free kick magic".

On 27 August 2026, Nogueira signed on loan with Major League Soccer club Orlando City through the 2027 season. As part of the deal, Orlando City acquired the option to purchase Nogueira at the end of the loan. Nogueira made his debut for Orlando City on 26 September as a second-half substitute in a 4–2 loss to the Philadelphia Union.

== Career statistics ==
As of match played 19 November 2026

Appearances and goals by club, season and competition
Club	Season	League			National cup (Note: Includes Svenska Cupen, Norwegian Football Cup, Bulgarian Cup)		Continental		Other		Total	
Club	Season	Division	Apps	Goals	Apps	Goals	Apps	Goals	Apps	Goals	Apps	Goals
Varbergs BoIS	2023	Allsvenskan	20	0	3	0	—		—		23	0
Halmstad	2024	Allsvenskan	29	0	5	0	—		—		34	0
Vålerenga (loan)	2025	Eliteserien	25	2	1	0	—		—		26	2
Ludogorets Razgrad	2025–26	Bulgarian First League	16	0	3	0	2 (Note: Appearances in UEFA Europa League)	0	—		21	0
Ludogorets Razgrad	2026–27	Bulgarian First League	2	0	—		2 (Note: Appearances in UEFA Conference League)	0	—		4	0
Ludogorets Razgrad	Total		18	0	3	0	4	0	0	0	25	0
Orlando City (loan)	2026	Major League Soccer	7	0	—		—		1 (Note: Appearance in MLS Cup playoffs)	0	8	0
Career total			99	2	12	0	4	0	1	0	115	2
