= Filip Thorvaldsen =

Norwegian footballer (born 2006)

Personal information
- Full name: Filip Erik Thorvaldsen
- Date of birth: 15 April 2006 (age 20)
- Place of birth: Norway
- Height: 1.74 m (5 ft 9 in)
- Position: Forward

Team information
- Current team: Twente
- Number: 17

Youth career
- 2018–2023: Vålerenga

Senior career*
Years	Team	Apps	(Gls)
2022–2024	Vålerenga 2	15	(4)
2023–2026	Vålerenga	56	(10)
2026–	Twente	6	(0)

International career^{‡}
2022	Norway U16	7	(1)
2023	Norway U17	9	(5)
- * Club domestic league appearances and goals as of 20 September 2026 ‡ National team caps and goals as of 6 October 2025

Filip Thorvaldsen (born 15 April 2006) is a Norwegian footballer who plays as a forward for Eredivisie side Twente.

== Personal life ==
Thorvaldsen came to the Vålerenga academy at the age of 12. He made his senior debut in May 2023, against Råde in the cup, before proceeding to make his league debut in June. He played three cup games of which Vålerenga won all, but the team lost five of the six league games he appeared in, and were relegated from the 2023 Eliteserien.

FK Haugesund had already made a transfer bid for Thorvaldsen before the season, and as the 2023 season came to a close, there were reports of Tromsø IL considering the player. Thorvaldsen however signed a long-term contract in July 2024, tying him to Vålerenga until the end of 2028.

Thorvaldsen got his breakthrough in the 2024 1. divisjon, where he scored his first goal for the team, in a 5–1 thrashing of Moss. He scored another as Vålerenga routed Sandnes Ulf 8–0.

== Career statistics ==
As of 15 October 2026

Appearances and goals by club, season and competition
Club	Season	League			National Cup		Europe		Total	
Club	Season	Division	Apps	Goals	Apps	Goals	Apps	Goals	Apps	Goals
Vålerenga 2	2022	2. divisjon	2	0	—		—		2	0
Vålerenga 2	2023	2. divisjon	10	4	—		—		10	4
Vålerenga 2	2024	2. divisjon	3	0	—		—		3	0
Vålerenga 2	Total		15	4	—		—		15	4
Vålerenga	2023	Eliteserien	6	0	3	0	—		9	0
Vålerenga	2024	1. divisjon	18	2	5	0	—		23	2
Vålerenga	2025	Eliteserien	21	5	1	0	—		22	5
Vålerenga	2026	Eliteserien	11	3	0	0	—		11	3
Vålerenga	Total		56	10	9	0	—		65	10
Twente	2026–27	Eredivisie	6	0	0	0	3 (Note: Appearances in UEFA Conference League)	0	9	0
Career total			77	14	9	0	3	0	89	14
