= Oscar Hedvall =

Danish footballer (born 1998)

Personal information
- Full name: Oscar Thore Hedvall
- Date of birth: 9 August 1998 (age 28)
- Place of birth: Silkeborg, Denmark
- Height: 1.95 m (6 ft 5 in)
- Position: Goalkeeper

Team information
- Current team: Vålerenga
- Number: 1

Youth career
- Silkeborg Kammeraterne
- Silkeborg

Senior career*
Years	Team	Apps	(Gls)
2016–2023	Silkeborg	38	(0)
2022	→ Fredericia (loan)	14	(0)
2023–2024	Midtjylland	0	(0)
2024–2025	Viborg	14	(0)
2025–	Vålerenga	38	(0)

International career^{‡}
2014	Denmark U17	3	(0)
2015–2016	Denmark U18	3	(0)
2019	Denmark U20	1	(0)
- * Club domestic league appearances and goals as of 15:44, 28 October 2026 (UTC) ‡ National team caps and goals as of 10 June 2019

Oscar Thore Hedvall (born 9 August 1998) is a Danish professional footballer who plays for Norwegian club Vålerenga. He has played for several clubs in both the Danish Superliga and Danish 1st Division since making his debut for his childhood club Silkeborg in 2019.

== Career ==
Hedvall made his professional debut on 3 March 2019, playing for Silkeborg in a Danish 1st Division match against Roskilde. At age 20, his debut was a success as Silkeborg won the match 3–1. Two months later, he was given a new four-year contract with Silkeborg until the summer of 2023. He finished the season with 14 appearances for the club as they were promoted alongside Viborg to the Danish Superliga.

Silkeborg struggled during the early part of their 2019–20 season, with Hedvall allowing 14 goals in the club's first five matches. The club changed goalkeepers by mid-September, benching Hedvall in favor of new signing Rafael Romo. Hedvall remained on the bench for the remainder of the season. Following the club's relegation back to the 1st Division and Romo's departure, he returned to a regular starting role. In a match against FC Fredericia in December 2020, his season was cut short with a torn cruciate ligament.

In early 2022, after a year of recovery, Hedvall was loaned to FC Fredericia until the summer. After 14 appearances for the club, he returned to Silkeborg in May. After no first-team appearances during Silkeborg's 2022–23 season and the expiration of his contract, he joined Superliga club Midtjylland on a three-year contract. He was later made Midtjylland's third-choice goalkeeper and left after one season, failing to make any appearances.

Citing a desire to play first-team football again, Hedvall left Midtjylland and joined rival Viborg on a three-year contract. He made his debut for the club on 18 August 2024 in a 1–1 draw against Copenhagen. He became the Viborg's first-choice goalkeeper after Lucas Lund faced internal discipline from the club. After a battle during winter break training, it was unsure if Hedvall or Lund would become the first-choice goalkeeper to start games in the spring. After 14 appearances in the fall, Hedvall failed to play again for the club and suggested in May that he would again be open to searching for a new club.

On 23 July 2025, it was announced that Hedvall had joined Norwegian club Vålerenga on a three-and-a-half year contract. He made his Eliteserien debut for the club on 3 August in a 2–1 win.

== International career ==
In May 2019, Hedvall was called up for the Denmark under-20 national team for matches against Iceland and Norway alongside several of his Silkeborg teammates.

== Career statistics ==
As of match played 24 October 2026

Appearances and goals by club, season and competition
Club	Season	League			National cup (Note: Includes Danish Cup, Norwegian Cup)		Other		Total	
Club	Season	Division	Apps	Goals	Apps	Goals	Apps	Goals	Apps	Goals
Silkeborg	2018–19	Danish 1st Division	14	0	0	0	—		14	0
Silkeborg	2019–20	Danish Superliga	9	0	1	0	—		10	0
Silkeborg	2020–21	Danish 1st Division	15	0	0	0	—		15	0
Silkeborg	2022–23	Danish 1st Division	0	0	0	0	—		0	0
Silkeborg	Total		38	0	1	0	0	0	39	0
Fredericia (loan)	2021–22	Danish 1st Division	14	0	—		—		14	0
FC Midtjylland	2023–24	Danish Superliga	0	0	0	0	—		0	0
Viborg	2024–25	Danish Superliga	14	0	0	0	—		14	0
Vålerenga	2025	Eliteserien	14	0	1	0	—		15	0
Vålerenga	2026	Eliteserien	24	0	0	0	—		24	0
Vålerenga	Total		38	0	1	0	0	0	39	0
Career Total			104	0	2	0	0	0	106	0
