= Jacob Eng =

Norwegian footballer (born 2004)

Personal information
- Full name: Jacob Emile Dicko Eng
- Date of birth: 14 September 2004 (age 22)
- Place of birth: Mali
- Height: 1.80 m (5 ft 11 in)
- Position: Striker

Youth career
- –2018: Sagene
- 2019–2021: Lyn

Senior career*
Years	Team	Apps	(Gls)
2021–2024	Vålerenga	32	(4)

International career
2021	Norway U17	2	(0)
2021–2022	Norway U18	5	(0)
2022–2024	Norway U19	4	(0)
- * Club domestic league appearances and goals as of 9 May 2024

Jacob Emile Dicko Eng (born 14 September 2004) is a Norwegian former football striker.

== Career ==
Starting his career in Sagene IF, he moved on to play youth football in Lyn. In 2021 he joined Vålerenga where he made his Eliteserien debut in July against Sarpsborg 08. He also played the first round of the 2021 Norwegian Football Cup before playing in the 2021–22 UEFA Conference League qualifying against Gent.

== International career ==
Born in Mali, Eng's mother is Malian and his father is Norwegian. He moved to Norway at a young age where he was raised in Oslo. He is a youth international for Norway, having played up to the Norway U19s.
