= Armin Ćulum =

Swedish footballer (born 2003)

Personal information
- Date of birth: 5 November 2003 (age 23)
- Height: 1.75 m (5 ft 9 in)
- Position: Forward

Team information
- Current team: Willem II
- Number: 11

Youth career
- Hässleholm

Senior career*
| Years | Team | Apps | (Gls) |
| 2021–2022 | Hässleholm | 49 | (11) |
| 2023 | Eskilstuna | 29 | (5) |
| 2023-2025 | Trelleborg | 34 | (6) |
| 2025– | Willem II | 26 | (4) |
- * Club domestic league appearances and goals as of 28 April 2026

Armin Ćulum (born 5 November 2003) is a Swedish professional footballer who plays as a forward for Dutch club Willem II in the Eerste Divisie.

== Career ==
He started his youth career in IFK Hässleholm and played two seasons for the senior team. He also played for AFC Eskilstuna prior to joining Superettan club Trelleborgs FF in December 2023. He went on to score seven goals in 51 all-competition appearances for the club, including one goal from 16 appearances in the Superettan for Trelleborg during the 2025 season.

He signed for Dutch club Willem II of the Eerste Divisie on 30 August 2025, agreeing a three-year contract.
