= Anton Ekeroth =

Swedish footballer (born 2002)

Personal information
- Full name: Anton Noah Christian Ekeroth
- Date of birth: 16 September 2001 (age 25)
- Height: 1.81 m (5 ft 11 in)
- Position: Left back

Team information
- Current team: Sigma Olomouc

Youth career
- –2021: Kalmar FF

Senior career*
Years	Team	Apps	(Gls)
2020	→ IFK Berga (loan)	2	(0)
2021	→ Oskarshamns AIK (loan)	25	(1)
2022–2023	AFC Eskilstuna	41	(2)
2023–2024	AC Horsens	29	(0)
2024–2026	Hamkam	46	(2)
2026–	Sigma Olomouc	0	(0)
- * Club domestic league appearances and goals as of 7 August 2026

Anton Ekeroth (born 16 September 2001) is a Swedish footballer who plays as a left back for Sigma Olomouc in the Czech Czech First League.

Ekeroth started his youth career in a small club. He played youth football for Kalmar FF, being loaned briefly to IFK Berga in 2020 while mostly playing for Kalmar's P19 Allsvenskan team. In 2021 he spent the entire season on loan to Kalmar's cooperation club Oskarshamns AIK.

He then moved to Superettan and AFC Eskilstuna in 2022. His first Superettan goal secured one point against Östersund in August 2023.

Shortly after that, he moved to the newly relegated club AC Horsens in the Danish 1st Division. He immediately became a starting player for Horsens. Shortly after the start of the 2024–25 Danish 1st Division, Ekeroth was bought by Hamkam in Norway. Ekeroth was determined to grab the chance to play in a first-tier league.
