= Naeem Mohammed =

Ghanaian footballer

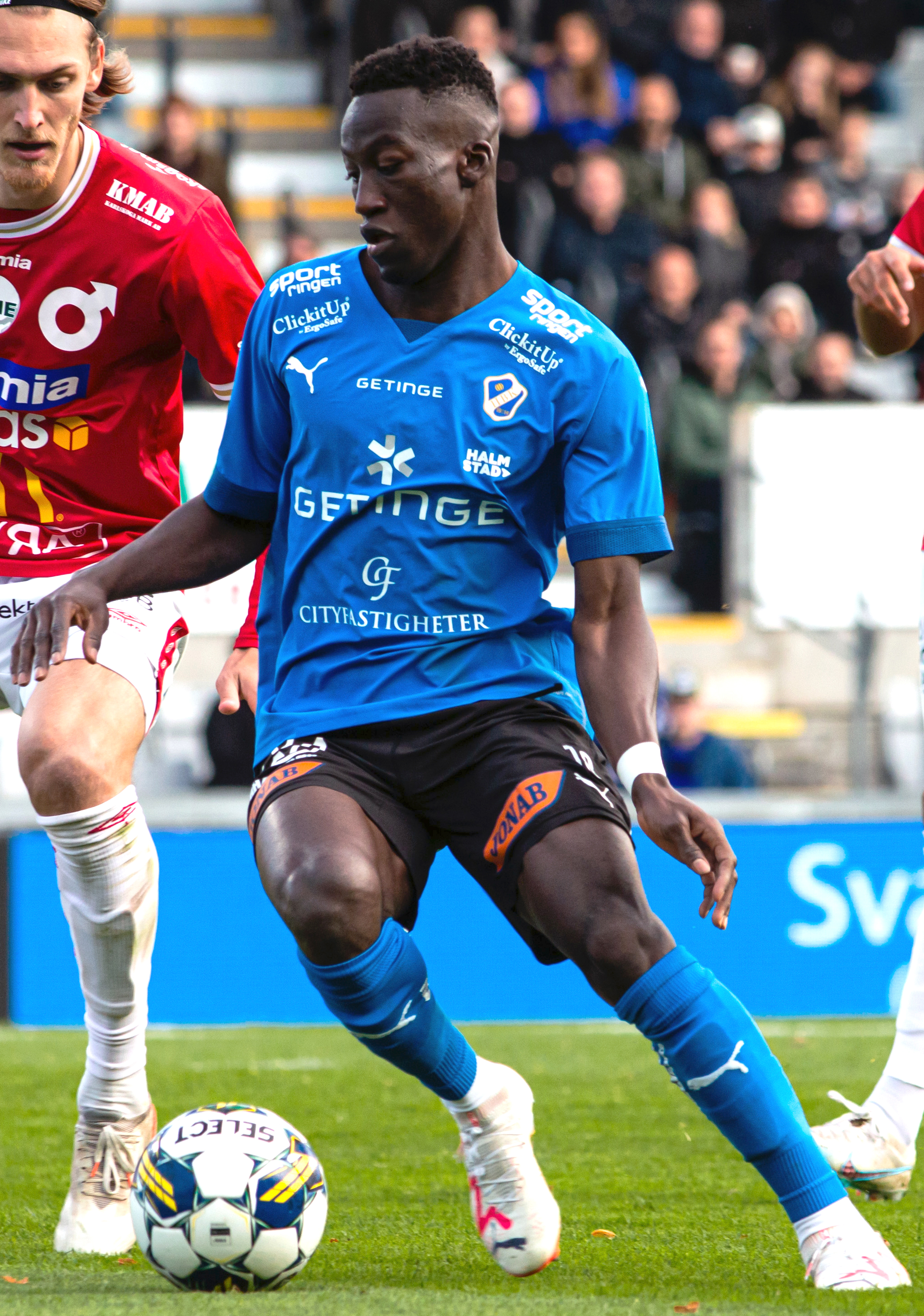

Personal information
- Date of birth: 11 November 1996 (age 29)
- Place of birth: Ghana
- Height: 1.75 m (5 ft 9 in)
- Position: Forward

Team information
- Current team: Chungnam Asan
- Number: 84

Youth career
- TUFA

Senior career*
Years	Team	Apps	(Gls)
-2019	TUFA		
2019	→ Sandvikens (Loan)	27	(8)
2020–2022	Sandvikens	80	(53)
2023–2026	Halmstads	63	(16)
2026–	Chungnam Asan	7	(2)
- * Club domestic league appearances and goals as of 6 August 2026

Naeem Mohammed (born 11 November 1996) is a Ghanaian professional footballer who plays as a forward for K League 2 club Chungnam Asan.

== Career ==
Mohammed started his career in Tamale Utrecht Football Academy in Ghana, before going on loan in 2019 to Swedish club Sandvikens IF playing in Ettan, making a good enough impression to have the Sandviken sign him after the season. He established himself as a reliable goalscorer for the club the following seasons and in 2022 became the clubs best goalscorer and the overall top goalscorer in Ettan with 23 goals. As Sandviken finished second in the league they went on to play-off against thirteenth placed in Superettan Örgryte IS, Sandviken lost with 3–4 on aggregate, however Naeem's goal scoring had not gone unnoticed and on 14 December newly Allsvenska promoted Halmstads BK announced that they had signed Naeem on a 3-year contract.
