= Nathan Fasika =

DR Congolese footballer

Idumba Fasika
Personal information
- Full name: Nathan Idumba Fasika
- Date of birth: 28 February 1999 (age 27)
- Place of birth: Kinshasa, DR Congo
- Height: 1.90 m (6 ft 3 in)
- Position: Defender

Senior career*
Years	Team	Apps	(Gls)
2019–2021	Lupopo		
2021–2025	Cape Town City	53	(2)
2024	→ Vålerenga 2 (loan)	8	(0)
2024	→ Vålerenga (loan)	7	(0)
2025	Chippa United	12	(0)

International career^{‡}
2020–	DR Congo	4	(0)
- * Club domestic league appearances and goals as of 4 January 2026 ‡ National team caps and goals as of 16 July 2021 (UTC)

Nathan Idumba Fasika (born 28 February 1999) is a Congolese professional footballer who plays as a defender for the DR Congo national team.

== International career ==
Fasika debuted with the DR Congo in a 1–0 2020 African Nations Championship win over Republic of the Congo on 17 January 2021.
