= Carl Lange (footballer) =

Danish footballer (born 1998)

Personal information
- Date of birth: 7 October 1998 (age 28)
- Place of birth: Copenhagen, Denmark
- Height: 1.78 m (5 ft 10 in)
- Position: Midfielder

Team information
- Current team: Vålerenga
- Number: 10

Youth career
- –2012: HIK
- 2012–2014: FC Copenhagen
- 2014–2017: HIK

Senior career*
Years	Team	Apps	(Gls)
2017–2018	HIK	40	(10)
2018–2022	Helsingør	63	(5)
2022–20214	Vendsyssel	53	(15)
2024–	Vålerenga	53	(6)
- * Club domestic league appearances and goals as of 23 July 2026

Carl Lange (born 7 October 1998) is a Danish professional footballer who plays as a midfielder for Eliteserien club Vålerenga.

A product of HIK, Lange began his senior career with the club before joining FC Helsingør in 2018. After four seasons at Helsingør, he moved to Vendsyssel FF, where his form in the 2023–24 Danish 1st Division earned him a transfer to Eliteserien club Vålerenga in 2024.

== Career ==
=== HIK ===
Lange was born in Copenhagen and spent most of his youth career with HIK. From under-14 to under-15 level, he was also part of FC Copenhagen's School of Excellence before returning to HIK.

In June 2017, HIK gave Lange a first-team contract for the 2017–18 season after what the club described as an "explosive" breakthrough in the spring qualification campaign, during which he scored twice. By the time he left the club the following year, he had made 43 first-team appearances and scored 11 goals.

=== Helsingør ===
In July 2018, Lange signed a three-year contract with FC Helsingør after training with the club's first-team squad for several weeks. He joined on a free transfer from HIK. During his time at Helsingør, he helped the club win promotion back to the Danish 1st Division. He later established himself in the side during a season in which Helsingør secured a top-six finish. After four seasons with the club, he left in August 2022 to join Vendsyssel FF.

=== Vendsyssel ===
Lange joined Vendsyssel FF in August 2022. He became an important attacking player for the club and, in the 2023–24 season, scored 11 goals in 27 league matches. When Vendsyssel sold him to Vålerenga in May 2024, the transfer was described by the Danish club as a record sale. Lange left Vendsyssel after 55 appearances and 16 goals.

=== Vålerenga ===
On 28 May 2024, Lange signed for Norwegian First Division club Vålerenga on a contract running until the end of 2027. He made his debut for the club on 20 July, coming on as a substitute in a 2–1 away win over Start. Later that season, Vålerenga sealed promotion back to the Eliteserien.

== Style of play ==
Primarily an attacking midfielder, Lange has also been used as a winger. HIK's talent chief Per Frimann highlighted his pace and one-on-one ability when the club awarded him his first senior contract, while Lange himself said in 2018 that he was most comfortable on the left side and wanted to be recognised for his understanding of the game. On signing him for Vålerenga, manager Geir Bakke said that he could operate both as an interior midfielder and as an inverted winger.
