= Elias Sørensen =

Danish footballer (born 1999)

Personal information
- Full name: Elias Fritjof Grænge Sørensen
- Date of birth: 18 September 1999 (age 27)
- Place of birth: Sjunkeby, Denmark
- Height: 1.89 m (6 ft 2 in)
- Position: Striker

Team information
- Current team: PEC Zwolle
- Number: 9

Youth career
- 2014–2016: HB Køge

Senior career*
Years	Team	Apps	(Gls)
2016	HB Køge	5	(0)
2016–2021	Newcastle United	0	(0)
2019	→ Blackpool (loan)	1	(0)
2019	→ Carlisle United (loan)	8	(0)
2020–2021	→ Almere City (loan)	23	(5)
2021–2024	Esbjerg	78	(39)
2024–2025	Portsmouth	12	(1)
2025–2026	Vålerenga	38	(13)
2026–	PEC Zwolle	10	(2)

International career^{‡}
2016	Denmark U17	1	(0)
2018	Denmark U19	1	(0)
2019	Denmark U20	3	(2)
2019	Denmark U21	2	(2)
- * Club domestic league appearances and goals as of 10 November 2026 ‡ National team caps and goals as of 19 January 2019

Elias Fritjof Grænge Sørensen (born 18 September 1999) is a Danish professional footballer who plays as a striker for Eredivisie club PEC Zwolle.

== Club career ==
After playing youth football for Danish club HB Køge, Sørensen became Køge's youngest-ever player after coming on as a late substitute against Silkeborg on 8 May 2016 at the age of 16. In the summer of 2016, following a trial period, Sørensen signed for Newcastle United. In January 2019, Sørensen signed on loan for Blackpool. Whilst with Blackpool, he also continued to play for the Newcastle under-23 team. Despite Blackpool manager Terry McPhillips suggesting he would play more games, he was recalled by Newcastle in March after making just one appearance for the club.

He then joined League Two side Carlisle United on 16 August 2019, on a loan deal until the end of the 2019–20 season. The loan was cut short on 20 December 2019 by Newcastle.

In October 2020 he moved on loan to Dutch club Almere City.

He returned to Denmark in July 2021, signing for Esbjerg. Sørensen impressed during the 2023–24 season in the Danish 2nd Division, winning promotion to the Danish 1st Division. He was awarded player of the season and became the top goalscorer with 24 goals and 12 assists in 30 appearances.

In August 2024, Sørensen returned to England, signing for Portsmouth for an undisclosed fee. He scored against Leeds United on his debut for the club. He left the club in January 2025, and later that month joined Norwegian club Vålerenga on a four-year deal.

On 19 June 2026, Sørensen moved to the Netherlands and signed a three-season contract with PEC Zwolle.

== International career ==
Sørensen has represented Denmark at under-17 and under-19 international youth levels, and has also been involved with the under-21 team.

== Career statistics ==
As of match played on 16 May 2026

Appearances and goals by club, season and competition
Club	Season	League			National cup		League cup		Other		Total	
Club	Season	Division	Apps	Goals	Apps	Goals	Apps	Goals	Apps	Goals	Apps	Goals
HB Køge	2015–16	Danish 1st Division	3	0	0	0	–		0	0	3	0
HB Køge	2016–17	Danish 1st Division	2	0	0	0	–		0	0	2	0
HB Køge	Total		5	0	0	0	0	0	0	0	5	0
Newcastle United	2016–17	EFL Championship	0	0	0	0	0	0	0	0	0	0
Newcastle United	2017–18	Premier League	0	0	0	0	0	0	0	0	0	0
Newcastle United	2018–19	Premier League	0	0	0	0	0	0	5 (Note: Appearances in EFL Trophy)	4	5	4
Newcastle United	2019–20	Premier League	0	0	0	0	0	0	0	0	0	0
Newcastle United	2020–21	Premier League	0	0	0	0	0	0	1	0	1	0
Newcastle United	Total		0	0	0	0	0	0	6	4	6	4
Blackpool (loan)	2018–19	EFL League One	1	0	0	0	0	0	0	0	1	0
Carlisle United (loan)	2019–20	EFL League Two	8	0	0	0	1	0	3	0	12	0
Almere City (loan)	2020–21	Eerste Divisie	23	5	1	0	–		0	0	24	5
Esbjerg	2021–22	Danish 1st Division	26	7	2	2	–		0	0	28	9
Esbjerg	2022–23	Danish 2nd Division	20	7	1	0	–		0	0	21	7
Esbjerg	2023–24	Danish 2nd Division	30	24	2	3	–		0	0	32	27
Esbjerg	2024–25	Danish 1st Division	2	1	0	0	–		0	0	2	1
Esbjerg	Total		78	39	5	5	0	0	0	0	83	44
Portsmouth	2024–25	EFL Championship	12	1	0	0	1	0	0	0	13	1
Vålerenga	2025	Eliteserien	28	12	2	0	0	0	0	0	30	12
Vålerenga	2026	Eliteserien	10	1	0	0	0	0	0	0	10	1
Vålerenga	Total		38	13	2	0	0	0	0	0	40	13
PEC Zwolle	2026–27	Eredivisie	10	2	1	0	0	0	0	0	11	2
Career total			206	60	9	5	2	0	9	4	226	69

== Honours ==
Esbjerg fB

- Danish 2nd Division: 2023–24

Individual

- Danish 2nd Division Player of the Season: 2023–24
- Danish 2nd Division top goalscorer: 2023–24
