= Håkon Sjåtil =

Norwegian footballer (born 2002)

Personal information
- Date of birth: 27 December 2002 (age 23)
- Position: Right back

Team information
- Current team: Vålerenga
- Number: 3

Youth career
- –2020: Lyn

Senior career*
Years	Team	Apps	(Gls)
2021	Lyn	13	(0)
2022–2023	Åsane	33	(2)
2024	Kristiansund	30	(0)
2025–	Vålerenga	34	(0)
- * Club domestic league appearances and goals as of 23 July 2026

Håkon Sjåtil (born 27 December 2002) is a Norwegian footballer who plays as a right back for Vålerenga.

Sjåtil played youth football in Lyn, on the same team as Oscar Bobb. Having made his debut for the senior team in the Third Division, he was discovered by second-tier club Åsane whom he joined in 2022. Playing very seldomly in 2022, he made his breakthrough in the 2023 1. divisjon where he started all 30 league games. He also scored his first two goals in first-team football. Åsane did not count upon retaining the player throughout the 2023–24 transfer window, and a number of clubs showed their interest.

Ahead of the 2024 season he was bought by Kristiansund BK as a direct replacement for Snorre Strand Nilsen. Already in his first match, a friendly match in January 2024, he was named as Kristiansund's best player. He went on to start the majority of KBK's games in the 2024 Eliteserien. He was subsequently brought back to Oslo and Vålerenga in 2025.

== Honours ==
Individual

- Norwegian First Division Young Player of the Month: September 2023
