= Onyebuchi Obasi =

Nigerian footballer

Personal information
- Date of birth: 5 May 2005 (age 21)
- Place of birth: Nigeria
- Height: 1.64 m (5 ft 5 in)
- Position: Right winger

Team information
- Current team: Hobro

Youth career
- 2022–2024: Beyond Limit Football Academy

Senior career*
Years	Team	Apps	(Gls)
2024	Vålerenga 2	39	(12)
2024–2026	Vålerenga	5	(1)
2026	→ Stockholm (loan)	2	(0)
2026–	Hobro	0	(0)
- * Club domestic league appearances and goals as of 12 July 2026

Onyebuchi Obasi (born 5 May 2005) is a Nigerian professional footballer who plays as a right winger for Danish 1st Division club Hobro.

== Early life ==
Obasi started playing football at Beyond Limit Football Academy, the youth football wing of Remo Stars F.C.

== Club career ==
=== Vålerenga IF ===
On 25 February 2024, Obasi transferred to Vålerenga on a four-and-a-half-year deal.
