= Aaron Kiil Olsen =

Norwegian footballer (born 2001)

Personal information
- Date of birth: 20 May 2001 (age 25)
- Place of birth: Norway
- Height: 1.83 m (6 ft 0 in)
- Position: Defender

Team information
- Current team: Vålerenga
- Number: 4

Youth career
- –2013: Moss
- 2014: Ekholt
- 2014: Bærumsløkka
- 2015–2018: Bærum

Senior career*
Years	Team	Apps	(Gls)
2019–2020	Bærum	37	(0)
2021–2022	KFUM	57	(1)
2023–	Vålerenga	80	(4)

International career^{‡}
2022	Norway U21	2	(0)
- * Club domestic league appearances and goals as of 23 July 2026 ‡ National team caps and goals as of 22 November 2022

Aaron Kiil Olsen (born 20 May 2001) is a Norwegian professional footballer who plays as a defender for Eliteserien club Vålerenga.

== Career ==
Starting his career in Moss FK, he moved when he was starting lower secondary school to play youth football in Bærum. In November 2018 he signed a two-year contract with the club. He made his debut for Bærum in the Second Division match against Odd 2.

In the beginning of 2021 he joined KFUM. The debut came in the First Division match against Jerv. In June 2022 he renewed his contract with KFUM.

He signed a four-year contract with Vålerenga in front of the 2023 season. He made his debut in a friendly match against AGF Aarhus. He made his Eliteserien debut on 1 May 2023, in the match against the main rival Lillestrøm SK.

== International career ==
Kiil Olsen was called up for the Norway U21 squad in 2023.

== Career statistics ==
As of 26 July 2025

Club	Season	League			National Cup		Other		Total	
Club	Season	Division	Apps	Goals	Apps	Goals	Apps	Goals	Apps	Goals
Bærum	2019	PostNord-ligaen	25	0	4	0	—		29	0
Bærum	2020	PostNord-ligaen	12	0	—		—		12	0
Bærum	Total		37	0	4	0	—		41	0
KFUM Oslo	2021	OBOS-ligaen	30	1	3	0	3 (Note: Appearances in the Eliteserien play-offs)	0	36	1
KFUM Oslo	2022	OBOS-ligaen	27	0	4	0	1	0	32	0
KFUM Oslo	Total		57	1	7	0	4	0	68	1
Vålerenga	2023	Eliteserien	12	1	2	0	2	0	16	1
Vålerenga	2024	OBOS-ligaen	28	1	4	0	0	0	32	1
Vålerenga	2025	Eliteserien	14	1	1	0	0	0	15	1
Vålerenga	Total		54	3	7	0	2	0	63	3
Career total			148	4	18	0	6	0	172	4
