= Aleksander Hammer Kjelsen =

Norwegian football player (born 2006)

Personal information
- Full name: Aleksander Hammer Kjelsen
- Date of birth: 3 January 2006 (age 20)
- Place of birth: Bærum, Norway
- Height: 1.83 m (6 ft 0 in)
- Position: Defender

Team information
- Current team: Aalesund
- Number: 5

Youth career
- –2020: Bærums Verk Hauger
- 2021: Vålerenga

Senior career*
Years	Team	Apps	(Gls)
2021–2024	Vålerenga	18	(0)
2021–2024	Vålerenga 2	61	(2)
2025–	Aalesund	43	(1)

International career^{‡}
2021	Norway U15	7	(1)
2022	Norway U16	13	(0)
2023	Norway U17	4	(0)
2023	Norway U18	17	(3)
2024–2025	Norway U19	8	(0)
2025–	Norway U21	3	(0)
- * Club domestic league appearances and goals as of 23 July 2026 ‡ National team caps and goals as of 14 November 2026

Aleksander Hammer Kjelsen (born 3 January 2006) is a Norwegian professional footballer who plays as defender for the Norwegian club Aalesund.

== Club career ==
Kjelsen spent his youth career at Bærums Verk Hauger.

On his 15th birthday, he signed a three-year contract with the Oslo based club Vålerenga. He got his first team debut in a cup match on 19 May 2022, being substituted on in the 82nd minute in a 5–1 win against Kolbu/KK. His league debut was on 16 May 2023, playing the last three minutes in a 3–0 win against HamKam.

On 4 March 2025, Kjelsen signed a contract with Aalesund until the summer of 2028.
