= Geir Bakke =

Norwegian footballer and manager (born 1969)

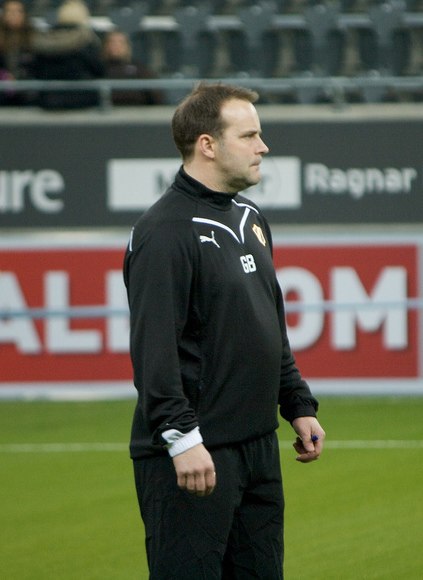
- Geir Bakke in 2009

Personal information
- Full name: Geir Bakke
- Date of birth: 23 October 1969 (age 57)
- Place of birth: Hamar, Norway

Team information
- Current team: Moss (head coach)

Youth career
- –1987: Rælingen

Senior career*
Years	Team	Apps	(Gls)
1987–1992	Strømmen		
1993–1994	Kongsvinger	27	(1)
1995–1997	Stabæk	39	(3)

International career
- Norway U19

Managerial career
- 1998–1999: Skjetten
- 2006–2008: Moss
- 2012–2013: Kristiansund
- 2015–2019: Sarpsborg 08
- 2020–2023: Lillestrøm
- 2023–2026: Vålerenga
- 2026–: Moss
- * Club domestic league appearances and goals

Geir Bakke (born 23 October 1969) is a Norwegian football coach and former player. He is the manager of 1. Division club Moss.

Geir Bakke was born at Hamar, where he spent his infant years, before his family relocated to Rælingen when he was six.

== Playing career ==
Geir Bakke started his playing career at local club Rælingen before switching to nearby Strømmen in 1987 at 18 years of age. Having made two appearances in the top division with Strømmen in 1988, the following seasons at the club was spent outside the top flight. Ahead of the 1993-season, he transferred to Kongsvinger with whom he spent two seasons playing mostly at right-back in Eliteserien. Ambitious, newly promoted Stabæk signed him ahead of the 1995-season. He would spend three seasons at Stabæk. He was a regular at right-back during his first season at Stabæk, and played fifteen games in his second season. A troublesome knee prevented him from playing any games in his third and final season at the club.

== Managerial career ==
Upon retiring as a player, he then pursued a managerial career, having been educated at Norges idrettshøyskole and worked several years coaching young players at Wang Toppidrett. He was hired to coach Skjetten in 1998 and 1999.

=== Vålerenga ===
Bakke was assistant coach in Vålerenga from 1999 to 2005. He was assistant under Tom Nordlie in his first two seasons at the club. From 2001 to 2005 he was assistant under Kjetil Rekdal. Vålerenga won Tippeligaen, the Norwegian top flight, in 2005. Bakke quit his position in Vålerenga after the 2005 season to become head coach in Moss FK.

=== Moss ===
As announced on 30 October 2005, he took over second tier club Moss effecting from the start of the 2006 season. This was Bakke's first job as a head coach for a professional football team. Moss finished fifth in the 2007 1. divisjon. Bakke resigned on 28 August 2008.

=== Stabæk ===
Geir Bakke was presented as assistant coach in Stabæk on 29 August 2008, the day after his resignation in Moss. He replaced Petter Belsvik and signed a three-year contract with the club. On 10 November 2011 it was announced that Bakke was leaving Stabæk to become head coach in Kristiansund BK.

=== Kristiansund ===
Bakke was head coach at Kristiansund for two seasons, from 2012 to 2013. Kristiansund won 2. divisjon Group 2 in Bakke's first season and were promoted to the 2013 1. divisjon. The 2013 season was the first season in club history that Kristiansund played at the second highest level in Norwegian football.

=== Molde ===
On 17 January 2014, Bakke was presented as the new assistant coach at Molde FK. His partnership with head coach Tor Ole Skullerud turned out successfully, and Molde won the league title with 71 points (as of 2018 a league record). On 23 October 2014, it was announced that Geir Bakke was leaving Molde after the 2014 season to become head coach in Sarpsborg 08.

=== Sarpsborg 08 ===
On 23 October 2014, Bakke was announced as head coach of Sarpborg 08. He signed a four-year deal with the club, effective 1 January 2015. He led the team to their first ever Norwegian Cup final in 2015, which they lost to Rosenborg with the score 0–2. In the 2017 season, Sarpsborg 08 finished third in Eliteserien. The third-place finish secured their first league medal in club history and qualified the club for European football for the first time. On 10 May 2017, Bakke signed a new five-year deal, which would have made him Sarpsborg 08's head coach until the end of the 2022 season. Instead Bakke left for then 1. division side Lillestrøm in 2019.

=== Lillestrøm ===
On 31 of December 2019, Geir Bakke was announced as the new head coach of Lillestrøm SK, which found themselves in the 1. division of Norwegian football. The following season, 2020, Bakke led the team to promotion back to the Eliteserien.

=== Return to Vålerenga ===
On 12 of July 2023, Geir Bakke became Vålerenga's head coach on a deal that would last till 2027. Vålerenga were relegated to the OBOS-ligaen after they lost the Eliteserien relegation playoff to Kristiansund BK, losing 4-5 on penalties after an aggregate score of 2-2. Bakke led his team to promotion back to the Eliteserien in the 2024 season after finishing 1^{st} in the league with 69 points. He finished the 2025 season in 6^{th}, with top goalscorer Elias Sørensen scoring 12 goals. On 6 of May 2026, Geir Bakke was sacked as head coach and was replaced by Petter Myhre, who served as the interim coach till a new coach was appointed. This came after a poor start to the season, with the team winning one of Bakke's last five matches.

== Managerial statistics ==
As of match played 8 November 2026

Managerial record by team and tenure
Team	From	To	Record				
Team	From	To	P	W	D	L	Win %
Moss	2006	28 August 2008	89	38	26	25	42.7
Kristiansund	1 January 2012	31 December 2013	60	35	10	15	58.3
Sarpsborg 08	1 January 2015	31 December 2019	156	67	43	46	42.9
Lillestrøm	31 December 2019	12 July 2023	102	55	21	26	53.9
Vålerenga	12 July 2023	6 May 2026	95	44	21	30	46.3
Moss	3 August 2026		17	5	3	9	29.4
Total			519	244	124	151	47.0

== Honours ==
=== Head coach ===
Kristiansund

- 2. divisjon, group 2: 2012

Sarpsborg 08

- Eliteserien: Bronze 2017
- Norwegian Cup: Runners-up 2015, 2017

Lillestrøm SK

- Norwegian Cup: Runners-up 2022-23
- 1. divisjon : Runners-up 2020

==== Vålerenga Fotball ====
- 1. divisjon: 2024

Individual

- Norwegian Football Coaches Association: Coach of the year in 2017
- Eliteserien Coach of the Month: July 2021, April 2022
- Norwegian First Division Coach of the Month: June 2024
