= Intility Arena =

Football stadium in Oslo, Norway

- Valle Hovin, Valle
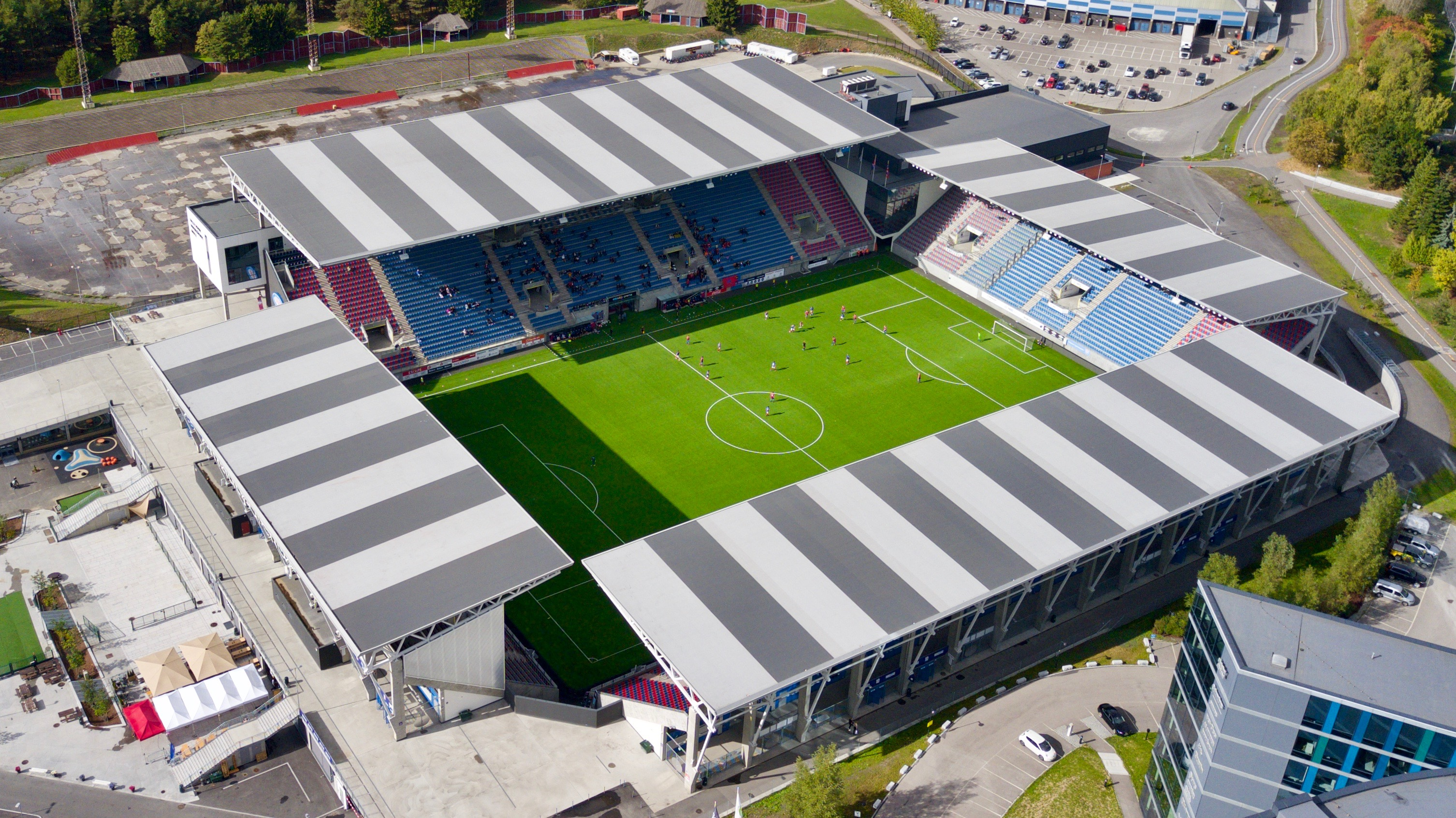
- Aerial view of Intility Arena
- Interactive map of Intility Arena
- Location: Valle Hovin, Oslo, Norway
- Coordinates: 59°55′4″N 10°48′25″E
- Owner: Vålerenga kultur- og idrettspark AS, owned by Vålerenga Fotball
- Operator: Vålerenga kultur- og idrettspark AS
- Capacity: 16,555; 15,389 (International capacity)
- Surface: Artificial grass
- Record attendance: 17,011 (Vålerenga vs Sarpsborg 08, 10 September 2017)
- Field size: 105 by 68 metres (115 by 74 yd)
- Public transit: Helsfyr

Construction
- Groundbreaking: 29 July 2015
- Opened: 9 September 2017
- Architect: Lille Frøen AS / Stefan Ekberg Arkitekter AS

Tenant
- Vålerenga Fotball (2017–present)

Intility Arena, also referred to as Vålerenga Stadion, is an association football stadium in Oslo, Norway. The stadium is the home stadium for Vålerenga Fotball, currently playing in the Eliteserien, and Vålerenga Fotball Damer, currently playing in the Toppserien. It has a seating capacity of 16,555 people.

The stadium plans were accepted by the city council of Oslo in 2014 and by EEA in June 2015. Construction started in August 2015, and the stadium opened in September 2017. The stadium was initially called Vålerenga kultur- og idrettspark.

== History ==
=== Early grounds ===
From the 1960s till the 1980s and a short period in the end of the 1990s Bislett Stadion was Vålerenga's home ground. Bislet Stadion also hosted speed skating and track and field events in addition to football, and hosted the 1952 Winter Olympics. Poor conditions and maintenance of Bislett forced Vålerenga to move to Ullevaal and a groundshare with FK Lyn.

=== Planning ===
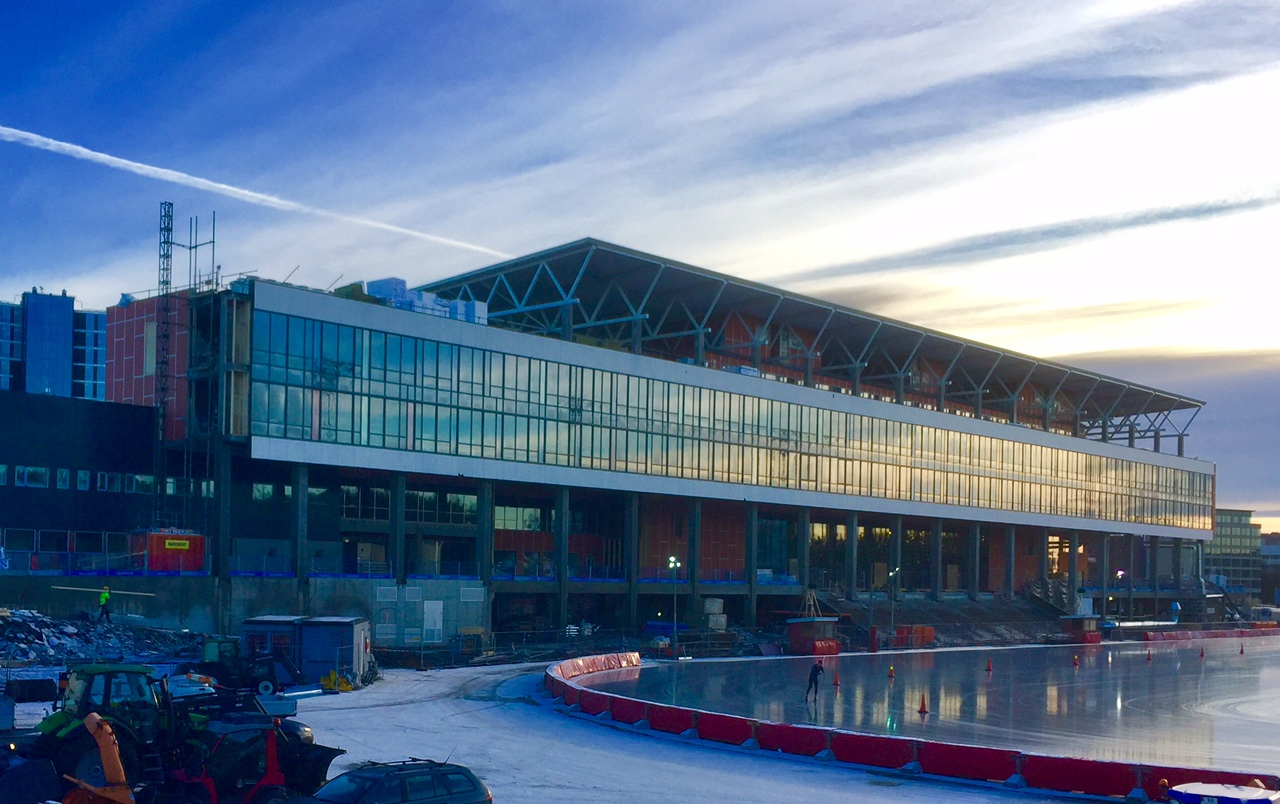
Facade West in January 2017.

After Vålerenga moved from Bislett Stadion plans for building their own ground were conceived, but poor results on the field combined with financial problems kept those plans at bay for a few years. After the second place in 2004 and the league title in 2005 as well as shipping magnate John Fredriksen's deletion of the club's debt in 2003, the talks of building a ground for Vålerenga resurfaced.

Following a press statement made on 15 May 2008, Vålerenga announced that they will be moving home to Valle Hovin after purchasing the area of the proposed stadium for the symbolic sum of 1 Norwegian Krone. In late 2014, the plans were accepted by the city council of Oslo. On 10 June 2014, the European Free Trade Association Surveillance Authority accepted the plans for the stadium.

=== Construction and opening ===
The foundation stone of the new stadium was laid on 29 July 2015, the club's 102nd anniversary. Construction started in the summer of 2015.

The first game at the stadium was played on 9 September 2017 and was a women's Toppserien game Vålerenga Damer won 2–0 against Kolbotn. The men's opening game was played on the following day, 10 September 2017, an Eliteserien game Vålerenga lost 1–2 against Sarpsborg 08. The record attendance of 17,011 spectators dates from this game.

=== Naming rights ===
In October 2017, Norwegian technology company Intility reached an agreement with Vålerenga to buy the stadium's naming rights for ten years. The deal saw the stadium's name change to Intility Arena.

=== Television facilities ===
TV broadcasts require specific lighting conditions which draw a lot of power from the electricity grid, and must continue even during a power failure. The stadium had to rent diesel backup engines for every game, though they have never been used. In 2025 the stadium installed a 1.2 MW / 2.2 MWh battery backup at less annual cost than renting the diesel generators. The battery also powers most of the 500 kW floodlights during games, and some of its power comes from local 740 kW solar panels.

== Transport ==
The stadium will be served by several stations on the Oslo Metro. Helsfyr Station is the closest station, approximately 500 metres away from Valle Hovin. Ensjø Station and Hasle Station are both approximately one kilometre away.

== See also ==
- Ullevaal Stadion
- List of Eliteserien venues
