= Henrik Bjørdal =

Norwegian footballer (born 1997)

Personal information
- Full name: Henrik Rørvik Bjørdal
- Date of birth: 4 February 1997 (age 29)
- Place of birth: Ålesund, Norway
- Height: 1.88 m (6 ft 2 in)
- Position: Midfielder

Team information
- Current team: Viking
- Number: 16

Youth career
- –2011: IL Valder
- 2012–2013: Aalesund

Senior career*
Years	Team	Apps	(Gls)
2013–2015	Aalesund	54	(1)
2016–2018	Brighton & Hove Albion	0	(0)
2017	→ IFK Göteborg (loan)	14	(0)
2018–2020	Zulte Waregem	44	(4)
2020–2026	Vålerenga	158	(26)
2026–	Viking	2	(2)

International career
2014	Norway U17	11	(1)
2015	Norway U19	5	(0)
2015–2018	Norway U21	14	(2)
- * Club domestic league appearances and goals as of 13 September 2026

Henrik Bjørdal (born 4 February 1997) is a Norwegian footballer who plays for Viking as a midfielder.

== Club career ==
Bjørdal played youth football for IL Valder. In 2012, he joined the youth team of Aalesunds FK, and was selected for the Norwegian under-15 national team. He made his senior debut for Aalesund as a substitute against Lillestrøm SK in May 2013.

On 27 January 2016, he signed for Brighton & Hove Albion's development squad which predominantly features players under the age of 21. On 6 March 2017, he signed for the Swedish club IFK Göteborg on loan until the end of the season. In June 2018, Bjørdal moved to Belgium side Zulte Waregem.

On 2 September 2026, Bjørdal signed a four-year contract with Viking.

== Career statistics ==
As of match played 13 September 2026

Appearances and goals by club, season and competition
Club	Season	League			Cup		Continental		Total	
Club	Season	Division	Apps	Goals	Apps	Goals	Apps	Goals	Apps	Goals
Aalesund	2013	Eliteserien	2	0	0	0	—		2	0
Aalesund	2014	Eliteserien	22	0	3	1	—		25	1
Aalesund	2015	Eliteserien	30	1	3	1	—		33	2
Aalesund	Total		54	1	6	2	—		60	3
IFK Göteborg	2017	Allsvenskan	14	0	0	0	—		14	0
Zulte Waregem	2018–19	Belgian Pro League	24	2	1	0	—		25	2
Zulte Waregem	2019–20	Belgian Pro League	20	2	3	0	—		23	2
Zulte Waregem	Total		44	4	4	0	—		48	4
Vålerenga	2020	Eliteserien	11	3	0	0	—		11	3
Vålerenga	2021	Eliteserien	30	4	3	1	2 (Note: Appearances in UEFA Conference League)	0	35	5
Vålerenga	2022	Eliteserien	24	4	1	0	—		25	4
Vålerenga	2023	Eliteserien	28	3	6	1	—		34	4
Vålerenga	2024	1. divisjon	26	7	2	0	—		28	7
Vålerenga	2025	Eliteserien	23	4	1	0	—		24	4
Vålerenga	2026	Eliteserien	16	1	1	0	—		17	1
Vålerenga	Total		158	26	14	2	2	0	174	28
Viking	2026	Eliteserien	2	2	0	0	1 (Note: Appearances in UEFA Champions League)	0	3	2
Career total			272	33	24	4	3	0	299	37

== Honours ==
Individual

- Eliteserien Goal of the Month: April 2025
