= Fischbein =

Fischbein my refer to:

- Efraim Fischbein, Israeli psychologist, expert in education of mathematics
- Eric Fischbein (born 1976), Swedish football player
- Fischbein Township, North Dakota
- Fischbein, the original name of Gascoyne, North Dakota

== See also ==
- Fishbeyn
