= 2005–06 Royal League =

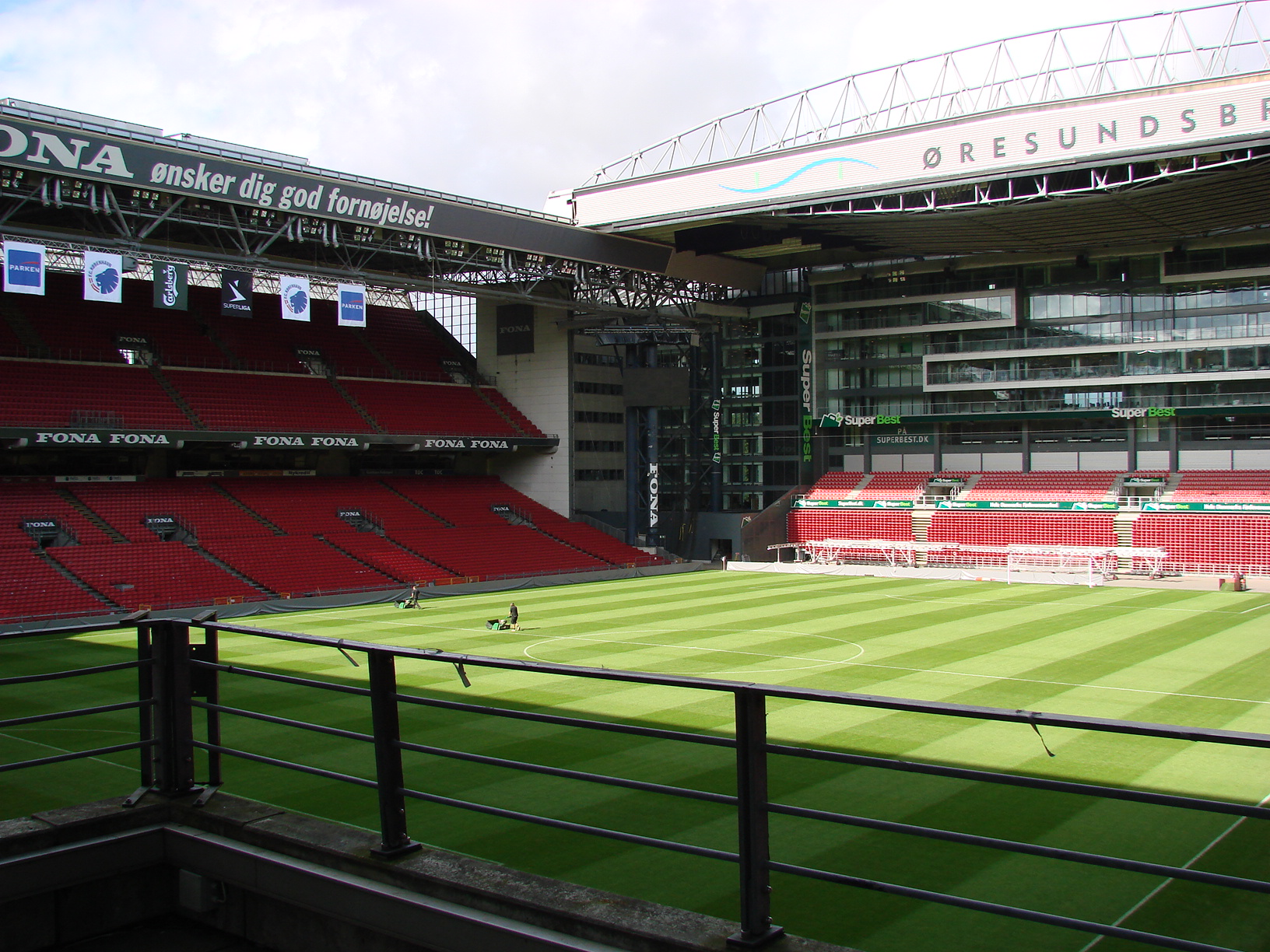
- Parken Stadium in Copenhagen hosted the final

Tournament details
- Dates: 10 November 2005 – 9 April 2006
- Teams: 12 (from 3 associations)

Final positions
- Champions: (Denmark) Copenhagen (2nd title)
- Runners-up: (Norway) Lillestrøm

Tournament statistics
- Matches played: 49
- Goals scored: 124 (2.53 per match)
- Top scorer(s): (Sweden) Tobias Hysén (Denmark) Klaus Kærgård (6 goals each)

The Royal League 2005-06 fixtures and results.

== Rules ==
Initially, the twelve participating teams are placed into three groups with four clubs each. These face each other home and away. The group winners and runners-up qualify for the quarter finals, along with the two best 3rd position-teams. From here on, the tournament is purely played as a two-legged knockout tournament, except from the final.

== Bonuses ==
A wide variety of bonuses are paid in the Royal League 2005–06. A complete list is found below. All amounts are in Norwegian kroner.

- Qualification to Royal League
  - Qualification to the tournament - 1,250,000 NOK (£141,525)
- Qualification to quarterfinals
  - Group winner - 1,250,000 NOK (£141,525)
  - Group runner-up - 1,000,000 NOK (£113,220)
  - Group third place - 500,000 NOK (£56,610)
- Match bonus
  - Win in group stage - 250,000 NOK (£28,305)
  - Draw in group stage - 125,000 NOK (£14,152.50)
  - Win in quarter- or semifinals - 400,000 NOK (£45,288)
  - Draw in quarter- or semifinals - 200,000 NOK (£22,644)
  - Win in the final (final champion) - 3,000,000 NOK (£339,660)
  - Loss in the final (final runner-up) - 1,000,000 NOK (£113,220)
- Spectator bonus (for achieving a certain average attendance in home games, except the final)
  - Over 3,000 - 100,000 NOK (£11,322)
  - Over 4,000 - 150,000 NOK (£16,983)
  - Over 5,000 - 200,000 NOK (£22,644)
  - Over 6,000 - 300,000 NOK (£33,966)
  - Over 7,000 - 400,000 NOK (£45,288)
  - Over 8,000 - 500,000 NOK (£56,610)
  - Over 9,000 - 600,000 NOK (£67,932)
  - Over 10,000 - 800,000 NOK (£90,576)
  - Over 15,000 - 1,000,000 NOK (£113,220)

== Group stage ==
Location of teams of the 2005–06 Royal League group stage.
Blue: Group 1; Red: Group 2; Green: Group 3.

Tiebreakers, if necessary, are applied in the following order:

1. Cumulative goal difference in all group matches.
2. Total goals scored in all group matches.
3. Points earned in head-to-head matches between the tied teams.
4. Total goals scored in head-to-head matches between the tied teams.
5. Away goals scored in head-to-head matches between the tied teams.
6. Draw.

=== Group 1 ===
Pos	Team	Pld	W	D	L	GF	GA	GD	Pts	Qualification
1	(Denmark) FC Midtjylland	6	3	3	0	13	5	+8	12	Advanced to knockout stage
2	(Sweden) Hammarby IF	6	2	2	2	12	10	+2	8	Advanced to knockout stage
3	(Norway) Vålerenga IF	6	2	2	2	8	10	−2	8	Advanced to knockout stage
4	(Norway) IK Start	6	0	3	3	8	16	−8	3	

Thursday 24 November	18:00	Midtjylland	4–0	Vålerenga	SAS Arena	Att: 3,154
	18:00	Start	2–4	Hammarby	Odd Stadion	Att: 639
Sunday 27 November	16:00	Vålerenga	3–1	Start	Ullevaal	Att: 2,940
Thursday 8 December	18:00	Start	1–1	Midtjylland	Odd Stadion	Att: 63
	20:35	Hammarby	0–0	Vålerenga	Söderstadion	Att: 6,061
Sunday 11 December	15:55	Start	3–3	Vålerenga	Odd Stadion	Att: 429
Monday 12 December	19:00	Hammarby	2–2	Midtjylland	Söderstadion	Att: 6,104
Thursday 9 February	19:00	Midtjylland	4–1	Hammarby	SAS Arena	Att: 3,052
Sunday 12 February	13:30	Vålerenga	0–1	Midtjylland	Vallhall Arena	Att: 2,653
	16:00	Hammarby	4–0	Start	Södertälje Fotbollsarena	Att: 4,153
Thursday 16 February	20:35	Midtjylland	1–1	Start	SAS Arena	Att: 3,370
	20:35	Vålerenga	2–1	Hammarby	Vallhall Arena	Att: 2,178

=== Group 2 ===
Pos	Team	Pld	W	D	L	GF	GA	GD	Pts	Qualification
1	(Norway) Lillestrøm SK	6	2	4	0	6	3	+3	10	Advanced to knockout stage
2	(Denmark) FC Copenhagen	6	1	4	1	5	5	0	7	Advanced to knockout stage
3	(Denmark) Brøndby IF	6	1	3	2	7	7	0	6	
4	(Sweden) Kalmar FF	6	1	3	2	3	6	−3	6	

Thursday 10 November	20:35	Kalmar FF	1–1	Brøndby	Fredriksskans	Att: 4,540
Thursday 24 November	20:30	Lillestrøm	0–0	Copenhagen	Åråsen Stadion	Att: 2,289
Sunday 27 November	14:00	Lillestrøm	0–0	Kalmar FF	Åråsen Stadion	Att: 1,777
Thursday 8 December	18:00	Kalmar FF	0–2	Lillestrøm	Fredriksskans	Att: 3,002
	20:35	Copenhagen	1–1	Brøndby	Parken	Att: 17,644
Sunday 11 December	16:00	Kalmar FF	1–0	Copenhagen	Fredriksskans	Att: 3,315
	18:05	Brøndby	0–1	Lillestrøm	Brøndby Stadion	Att: 7,481
Thursday 9 February	20:35	Brøndby	1–2	Copenhagen	Brøndby Stadion	Att: 12,345
Sunday 12 February	16:00	Brøndby	2–0	Kalmar FF	Brøndby Stadion	Att: 7,851
	16:00	Copenhagen	1–1	Lillestrøm	Parken	Att: 7,067
Thursday 16 February	20:35	Copenhagen	1–1	Kalmar FF	Parken	Att: 5,432
	20:35	Lillestrøm	2–2	Brøndby	Tønsberg Gressbane	Att: 323

=== Group 3 ===
Pos	Team	Pld	W	D	L	GF	GA	GD	Pts	Qualification
1	(Sweden) Djurgårdens IF	6	3	1	2	8	7	+1	10	Advanced to knockout stage
2	(Norway) Lyn Oslo	6	2	2	2	7	6	+1	8	Advanced to knockout stage
3	(Sweden) IFK Göteborg	6	2	2	2	7	7	0	8	Advanced to knockout stage
4	(Denmark) AaB	6	1	3	2	7	9	−2	6	

Thursday 24 November	19:00	Lyn	1–0	Göteborg	Tønsberg Gressbane	Att: 890
	20:35	AaB	1–3	Djurgården	Aalborg Stadion	Att: 5,246
Sunday 27 November	16:00	Djurgården	0–1	Göteborg	Södertälje Fotbollsarena	Att: 2,238
Thursday 8 December	18:00	Göteborg	3–3	AaB	Ullevi	Att: 4,178
	20:30	Lyn	1–2	Djurgården	Ullevaal	Att: 1,050
Sunday 11 December	15:00	Göteborg	1–3	Lyn	Ullevi	Att: 6,277
Tuesday 13 December	19:00	Djurgården	2–1	AaB	Södertälje Fotbollsarena	Att: 1,309
Thursday 9 February	19:00	AaB	2–1	Lyn	Aalborg Stadion	Att: 3,012
Sunday 12 February	16:00	Göteborg	2–0	Djurgården	Ullevi	Att: 3,349
	16:00	Lyn	0–0	AaB	Vallhall Arena	Att: 1,040
Thursday 16 February	20:35	AaB	0–0	Göteborg	Aalborg Stadion	Att: 3,771
	20:35	Djurgården	1–1	Lyn	Södertälje Fotbollsarena	Att: 1,244

=== 3rd placed teams ===
Pos	Team	Pld	W	D	L	GF	GA	GD	Pts	Qualification
1	(Sweden) IFK Göteborg	6	2	2	2	7	7	0	8	Advanced to knockout stage
2	(Norway) Vålerenga IF	6	2	2	2	8	10	−2	8	Advanced to knockout stage
3	(Denmark) Brøndby IF	6	1	3	2	7	7	0	6	

== Knockout stage ==
=== Quarter-finals ===
==== First leg ====
23 February 2006
18:00

Lyn (Norway)	1–3	(Denmark) Midtjylland
Theorin 45'		Kærgård 9', 60'; Sørensen 11'

Tønsberg Gressbane, Tønsberg
Attendance: 303
Referee: Stefan Johannesson (Sweden)

23 February 2006
18:30

Djurgården (Sweden)	2–1	(Norway) Vålerenga
Hysén 9', 67'		Berre 82'

Södertälje Fotbollsarena, Södertälje
Attendance: 1,130
Referee: Mikael Svendsen (Denmark)

23 February 2006
20:35

Copenhagen (Denmark)	2–0	(Sweden) Hammarby
Santos 55'; Allbäck 56'

Parken, Copenhagen
Attendance: 6,011
Referee: Svein Oddvar Moen (Norway)

23 February 2006
20:35

Göteborg (Sweden)	0–0	(Norway) Lillestrøm

Ullevi, Gothenburg
Attendance: 2,228
Referee: Peter Rasmussen (Denmark)

==== Second leg ====
9 March 2006
18:30

Midtjylland (Denmark)	1–0	(Norway) Lyn
Sørensen 54'

SAS Arena, Herning
Attendance: 3,313
Referee: Martin Hansson (Sweden)

Midtjylland win 4–1 on aggregate

9 March 2006
20:35

Hammarby (Sweden)	2–0	(Denmark) Copenhagen
Andersson 87', 90'
Penalties
von Schlebrügge (penalty missed); Andersson (penalty missed); Fischbein (penalty missed)	0–3	(penalty scored) Jacobsen; (penalty scored) Hutchinson; (penalty scored) Pimpong

Södertälje Fotbollsarena, Södertälje
Attendance: 2,172
Referee: Tom Henning Øvrebø (Norway)

Copenhagen win 3–0 on penalties after playing 2–2 on aggregate

9 March 2006
20:35

Vålerenga (Norway)	1–3	(Sweden) Djurgården
Muri 49'		Jonson 14'; Håkansson 25'; Hysén 80'

Tønsberg Gressbane, Tønsberg
Attendance: 996
Referee: Claus Bo Larsen (Denmark)

Djurgården win 5–2 on aggregate

11 March 2006
14:00

Lillestrøm (Norway)	2–0	(Sweden) Göteborg
Occean 10', 70'

Tønsberg Gressbane, Tønsberg
Attendance: 586
Referee: Nicolai Vollquartz (Denmark)

Lillestrøm win 2–0 on aggregate

=== Semi-finals ===
==== First leg ====
16 March 2006
20:35

Copenhagen (Denmark)	3–1	(Denmark) Midtjylland
Silberbauer 13'; Ijeh 25'; Hangeland 73'		Reid 87'

Parken, Copenhagen
Attendance: 9,232
Referee: Terje Hauge (Norway)

16 March 2006
20:35

Djurgården (Sweden)	1–3	(Norway) Lillestrøm
Håkansson 77' (pen.)		Koren 19'; Andersson 68'; Storm 86' (o.g.)

Södertälje Fotbollsarena, Södertälje
Attendance: 2,180
Referee: Knud Erik Fisker (Denmark)

==== Second leg ====
23 March 2006
20:35

Midtjylland (Denmark)	0–4	(Denmark) Copenhagen
		Ijeh 24', 43'; Silberbauer 32'; Kvist 62'

SAS Arena, Herning
Attendance: 5,285
Referee: Daniel Stålhammar (Sweden)

Copenhagen win 7–1 on aggregate

26 March 2006
15:30

Lillestrøm (Norway)	1–0	(Sweden) Djurgården
Koren 24' (pen.)

Åråsen Stadion, Lillestrøm
Attendance: 4,301
Referee: Thomas Vejlgaard (Denmark)

Lillestrøm win 4–1 on aggregate

=== Final ===
6 April 2006
20:35 CEST (UTC+2)

Copenhagen (Denmark)	1–0	(Norway) Lillestrøm
Pimpong 89'

Parken, Copenhagen
Attendance: 13,617
Referee: Peter Fröjdfeldt (Sweden)

2005-06 champions

Second title

== Top scorers ==
Goal scorer	Team	Goals
(Sweden) Tobias Hysén	Djurgården	6
(Denmark) Klaus Kærgård	Midtjylland	6
(Sweden) Petter Andersson	Hammarby	4
(Norway) Morten Berre	Vålerenga	4
(Denmark) Dennis Sørensen	Midtjylland	4
(Sweden) Jeffrey Aubynn	Hammarby	3
(Nigeria) Peter Ijeh	Copenhagen	3
(Sweden) David Johansson	Hammarby	3
(Faroe Islands) Todi Jónsson	Start	3
(Canada) Olivier Occean	Lillestrøm	3
(Sweden) Stefan Selakovic	Göteborg	3
(Norway) Jo Tessem	Lyn	3

Preceded by 2004–05	Royal League; 2005–06	Succeeded by 2006–07
