= Fishbeyn =

Fishbein and Fishbeyn (Yiddish: פישביין) (literally fish + bone), ("whalebone") is a Yiddish surname. Notable people with the surname include:

- Anna Fishbeyn (born 1983), Russian-American actress, writer, and filmmaker
- Alexander Fishbein (born 1968), chess player
- Anne Fishbein (born 1958), American photographer
- Craig C. Fishbein
- Frieda Fishbein
- Harry Fishbein (1896–1976), American bridge player
- Jonathan Fishbein, American physician
- Lillian Desow-Fishbein
- Martin Fishbein (1936–2009), American social psychologist
- Morris Fishbein (1889–1976), physician
- Moysey Fishbein, Ukrainian journalist
- Susie Fishbein (born 1968), Jewish cookbook author

== See also ==
- Fischbein (disambiguation)
