= Edward Bowman =

Edward Bowman may refer to:

- Eddie Bowman (born 1944), English rugby league footballer
- Edward M. Bowman (politician), member of the Dakota Territory House of Representatives
- Edward Morris Bowman (1848–1913), American organist, conductor, composer, and music educator
- Edward R. Bowman (1826–1898), U.S. Navy sailor and Medal of Honor recipient
- Edward Kellett-Bowman (1931–2022), British business and management consultant, and MEP
