= Scranton Township, Bowman County, North Dakota =

Scranton Township, North Dakota
- Township
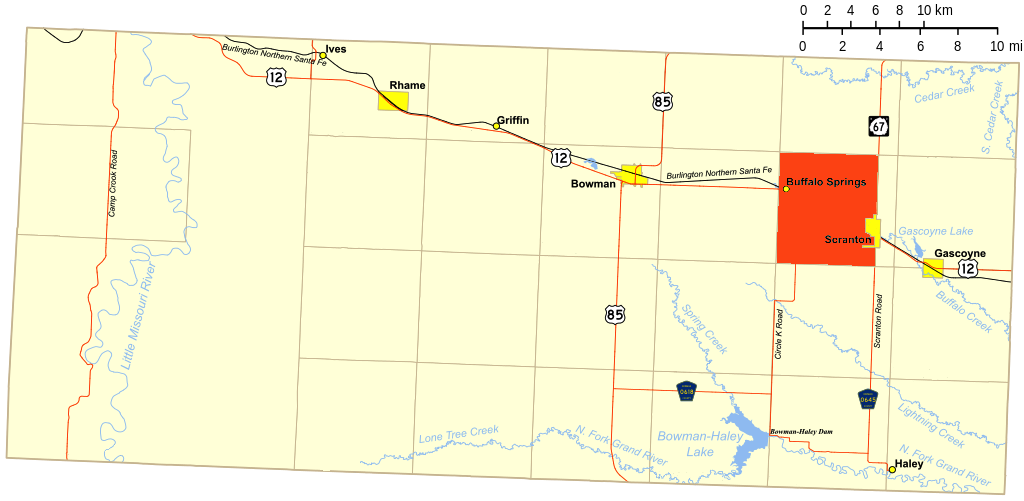
- Location of Scranton Township
- Coordinates: 46°07′38″N 103°10′44″W
- Country: United States
- State: North Dakota
- County: Bowman

Population (2010)
  - Total: 67
- Time zone: UTC-7 (Mountain (MST))
  - Summer (DST): UTC-6 (MDT)

Scranton Township is a township in Bowman County in the U.S. state of North Dakota. Its population during the 2010 Census was 67.
