= Hart, North Dakota =

- Unorganized territory
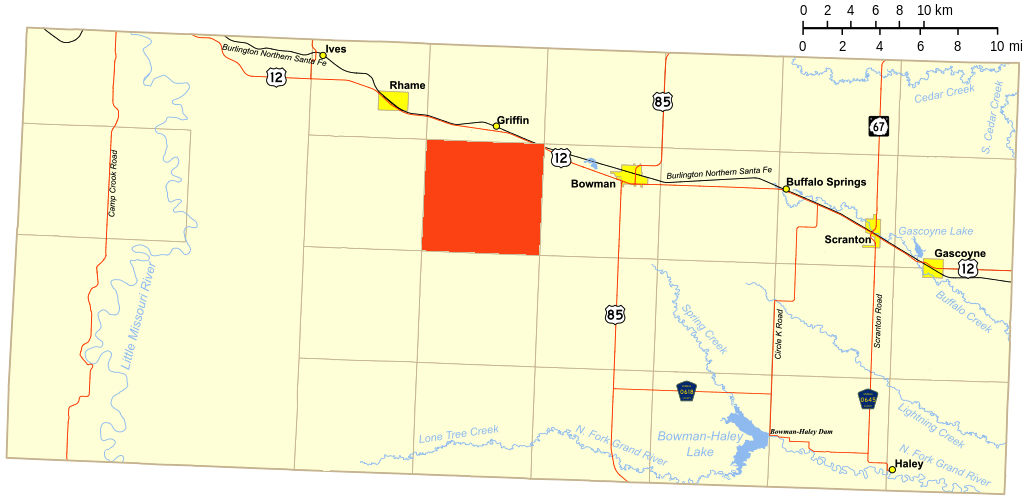
- Location of Hart
- Coordinates: 46°09′44″N 103°33′23″W
- Country: United States
- State: North Dakota
- County: Bowman
- Elevation: 3,133 ft (955 m)

Population (2010)
  - Total: 25
- Time zone: UTC-7 (Mountain (MST))
  - Summer (DST): UTC-6 (MDT)
- Area code: 701
- GNIS feature ID: 1036082

Hart is an unorganized territory in Bowman County in the U.S. state of North Dakota. As of the 2010 census, its population was 25.
