= Valle-Hovin =

Neighborhood in Oslo, Norway

Coordinates: 59.9180°N 10.8061°E

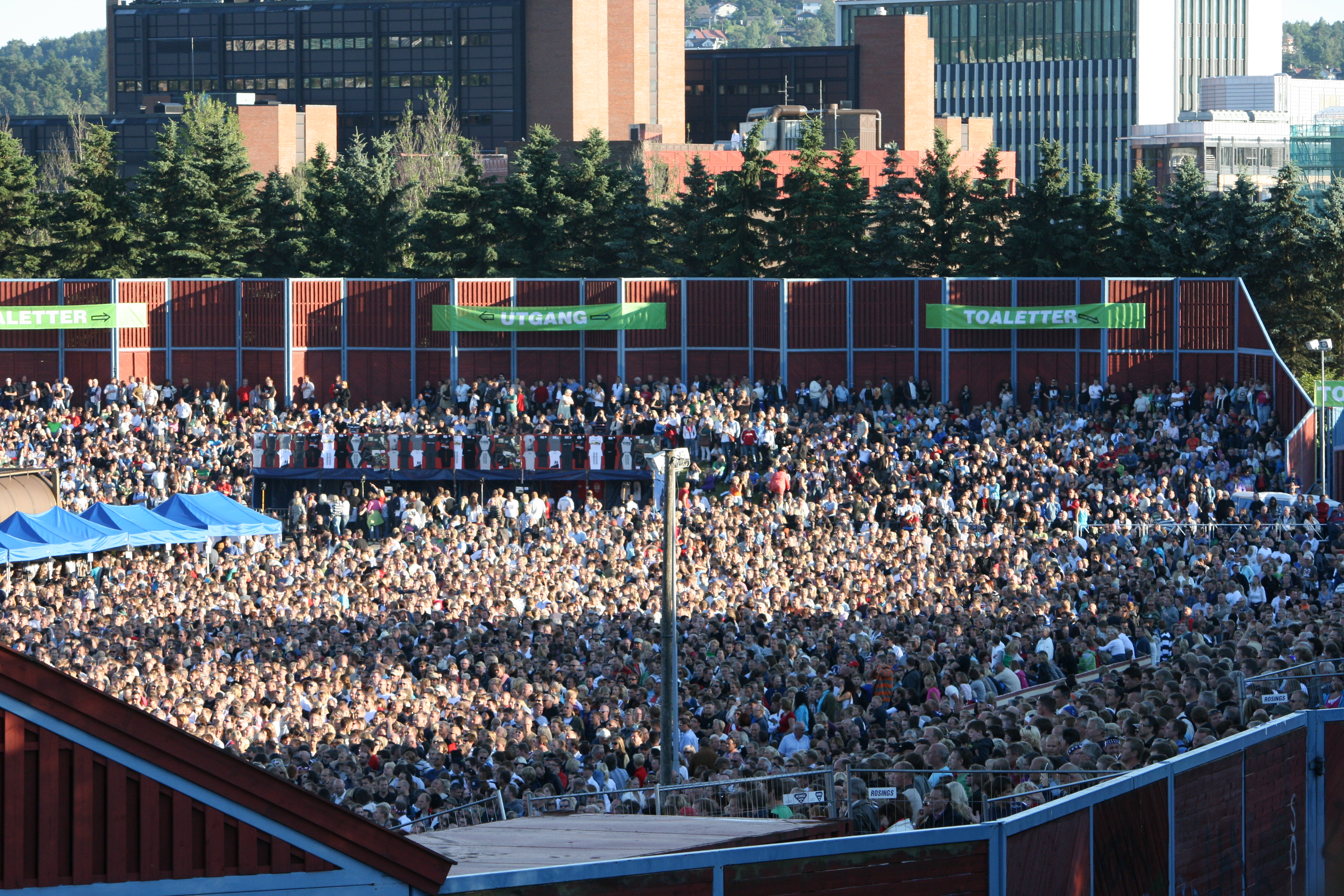
A Bruce Springsteen concert at Valle Hovin

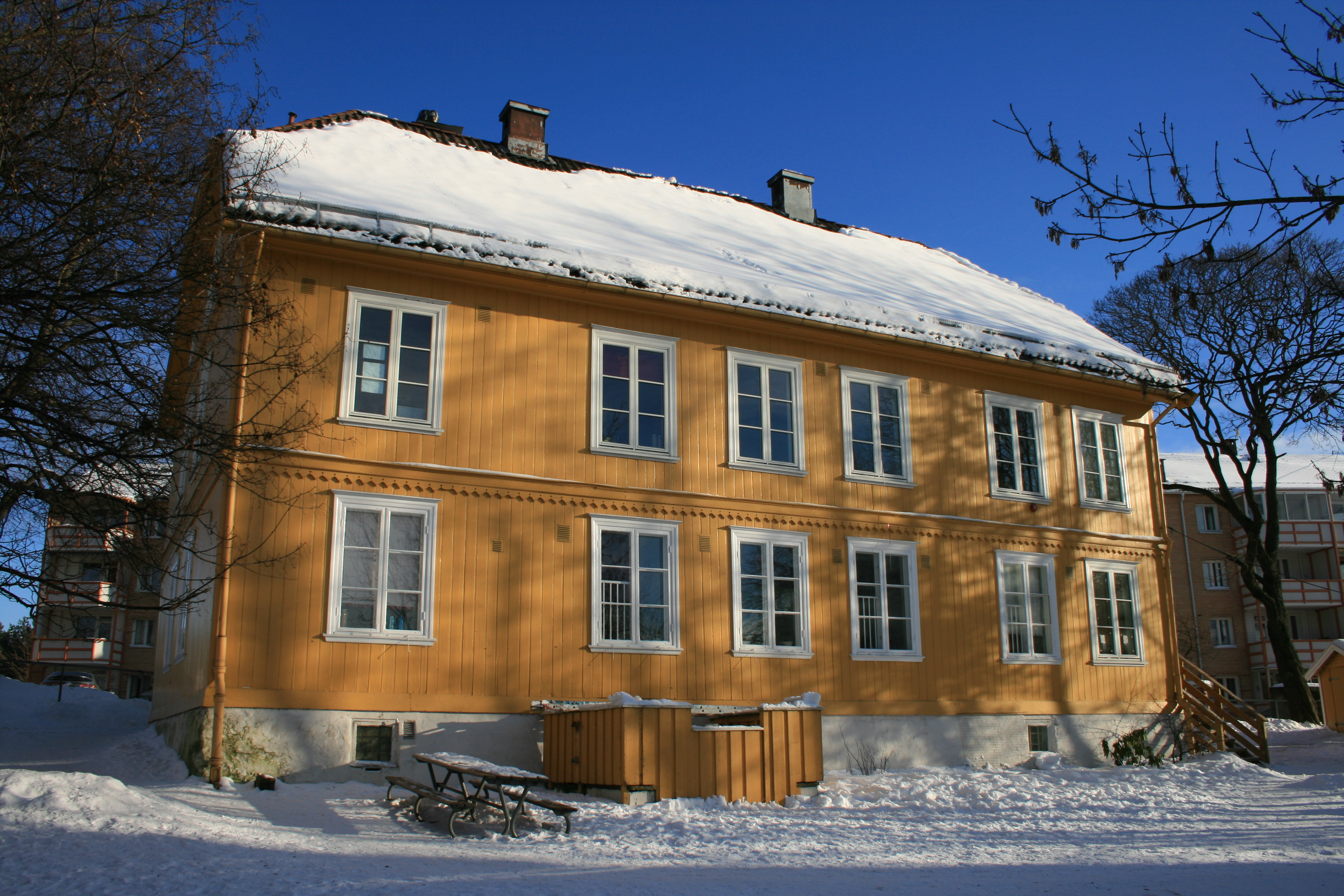
The old farm building at Valle

Valle-Hovin is a neighborhood in Oslo, Norway, best known for the sports and music venue of the same name.

It consists of two neighborhoods with unclear boundaries, Valle and Hovin. Valle was a farm under Nonneseter but was bought by private owners in 1765; the farm Hovin was probably under Torshov, then under Oslo Cathedral before the Reformation. It was bought by private owners in 1664. The farms Valle and Hovin were both bought by Oslo Municipality in 1915. The municipality planned to use the area for an airfield in the 1930s, but in the 1960s, it was decided that a sports complex Valle Hovin would be created. It is also used for larger musical shows. In 2001, the indoor arena, mostly used for soccer, Vallhall Arena was opened. In 2017, in Vålerengas, a new stadium, Intility Arena was opened.

The area was also built up during the 1950s, mostly with apartment blocks. The area is served by Helsfyr station on the Oslo Metro.
