= Sunny Slope Township, Bowman County, North Dakota =

Sunny Slope Township, North Dakota
- Township
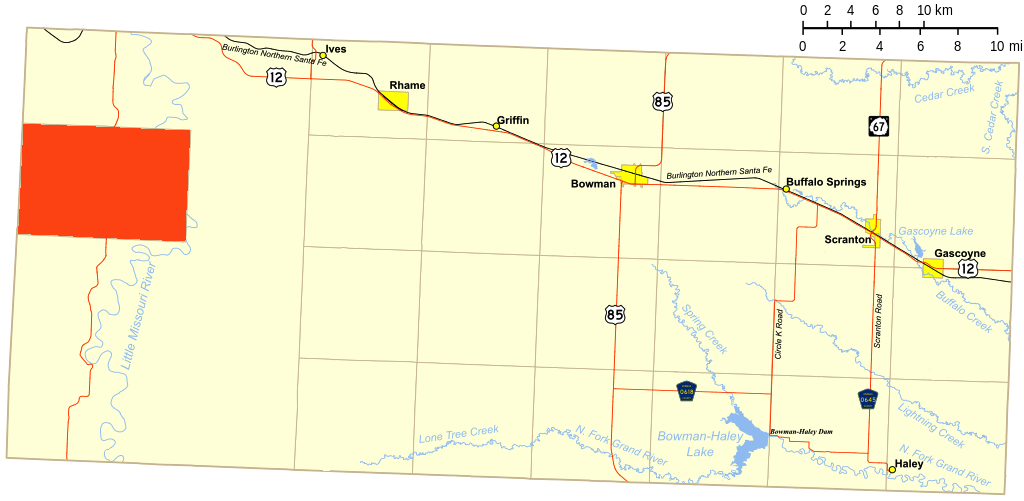
- Location of Sunny Slope Township
- Coordinates: 46°10′48″N 103°57′40″W
- Country: United States
- State: North Dakota
- County: Bowman

Population (2010)
  - Total: 9
- Time zone: UTC-7 (Mountain (MST))
  - Summer (DST): UTC-6 (MDT)

Sunny Slope Township is a civil township in Bowman County in the U.S. state of North Dakota. As of the 2010 census, its population was 9.
