= Adelaide Township, North Dakota =

- Township
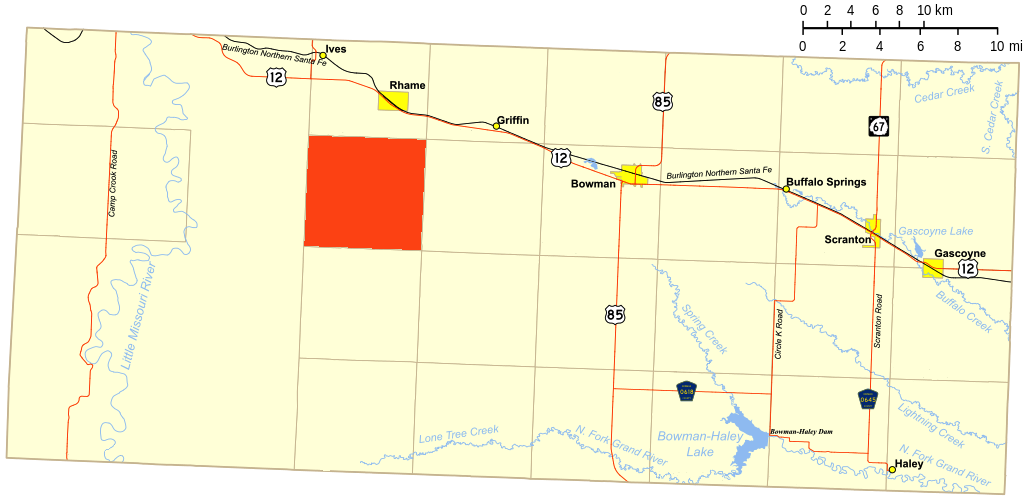
- Location of Adelaide Township
- Coordinates: 46°9′13″N 103°41′29″W
- Country: United States
- State: North Dakota
- County: Bowman

Area
  - Total: 35.7 sq mi (92.5 km^{2})
  - Land: 35.7 sq mi (92.4 km^{2})
  - Water: 0.039 sq mi (0.1 km^{2})
- Elevation: 3,163 ft (964 m)

Population (2010)
  - Total: 29
  - Density: 0.78/sq mi (0.3/km^{2})
- Time zone: UTC-7 (Mountain (MST))
  - Summer (DST): UTC-6 (MDT)
- Area code: 701
- FIPS code: 38-00540
- GNIS feature ID: 1759307

Adelaide Township is a township in Bowman County in the U.S. state of North Dakota. Its population during the 2010 Census was 29, down from a population of 31 in 2000.
