= Gascoyne Township, Bowman County, North Dakota =

Gascoyne Township, North Dakota
- Township
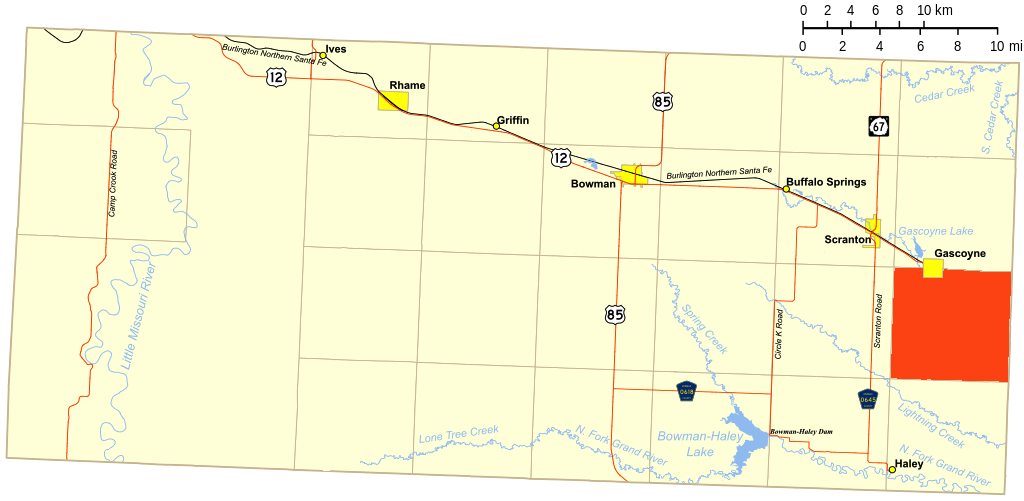
- Location of Gascoyne Township
- Coordinates: 46°05′23″N 103°03′35″W
- Country: United States
- State: North Dakota
- County: Bowman

Population (2010)
  - Total: 13
- Time zone: UTC-7 (Mountain (MST))
  - Summer (DST): UTC-6 (MDT)

Gascoyne Township is a civil township in Bowman County in the U.S. state of North Dakota. As of the 2010 census, its population was 13.
