= Bowman Township, North Dakota =

- Township
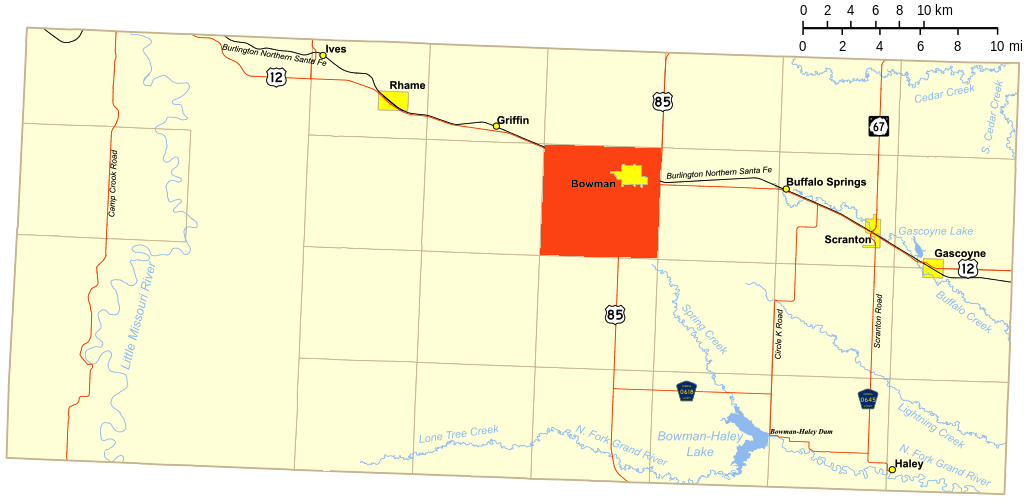
- Location of Bowman Township
- Coordinates: 46°9′33″N 103°27′04″W
- Country: United States
- State: North Dakota
- County: Bowman

Population (2010)
  - Total: 257
- Time zone: UTC-7 (Mountain (MST))
  - Summer (DST): UTC-6 (MDT)

Bowman Township is a township in Bowman County in the U.S. state of North Dakota. Its population during the 2010 Census was 257.
