= Marion Township, Bowman County, North Dakota =

Marion Township, North Dakota
- Township
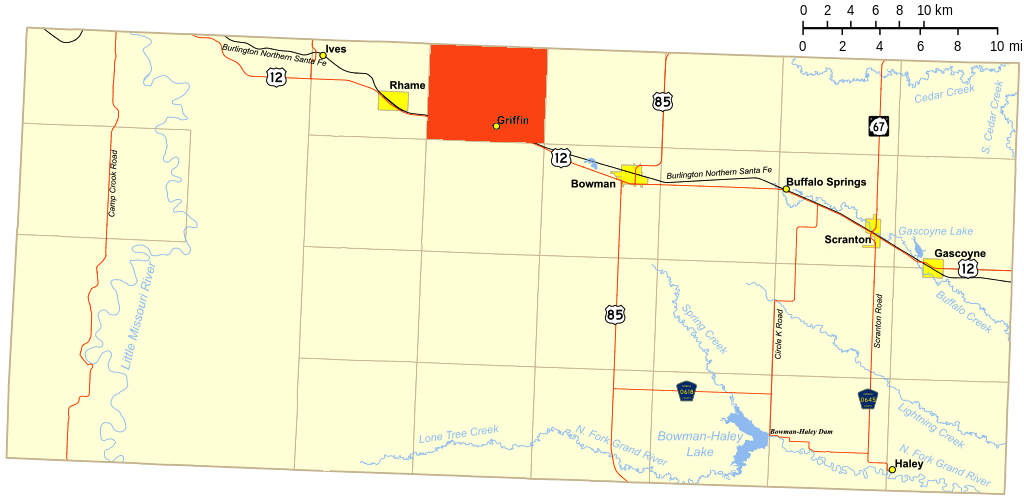
- Location of Marion Township
- Coordinates: 46°14′04″N 103°33′11″W
- Country: United States
- State: North Dakota
- County: Bowman

Population (2010)
  - Total: 17
- Time zone: UTC-7 (Mountain (MST))
  - Summer (DST): UTC-6 (MDT)

Marion Township is a township in Bowman County in the U.S. state of North Dakota. Its population during the 2010 Census was 17.
