= Stillwater Township, Bowman County, North Dakota =

Stillwater Township, North Dakota
- Township
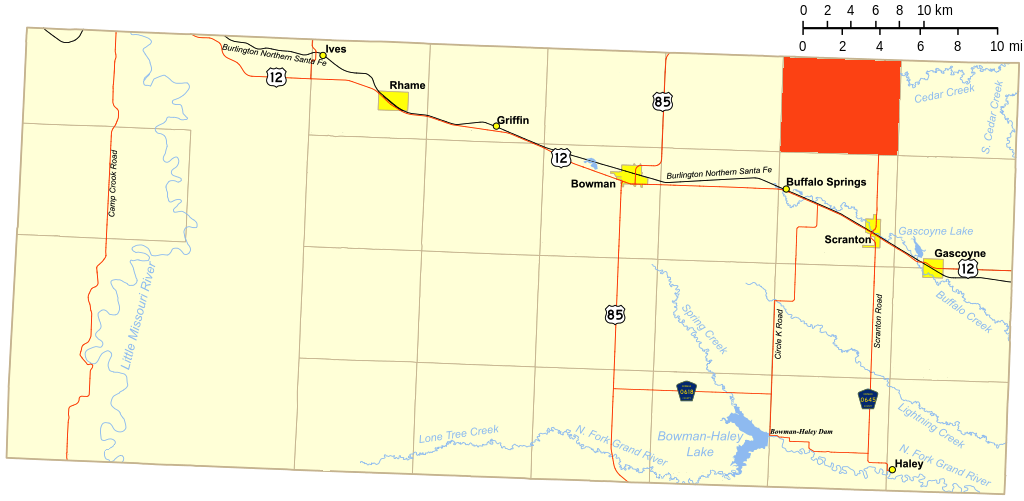
- Location of Stillwater Township
- Coordinates: 46°14′29″N 103°10′14″W
- Country: United States
- State: North Dakota
- County: Bowman

Population (2010)
  - Total: 28
- Time zone: UTC-7 (Mountain (MST))
  - Summer (DST): UTC-6 (MDT)

Stillwater Township is a township in Bowman County in the U.S. state of North Dakota. Its population during the 2010 Census was 28.
