= West Bowman, North Dakota =

- Unorganized Territory
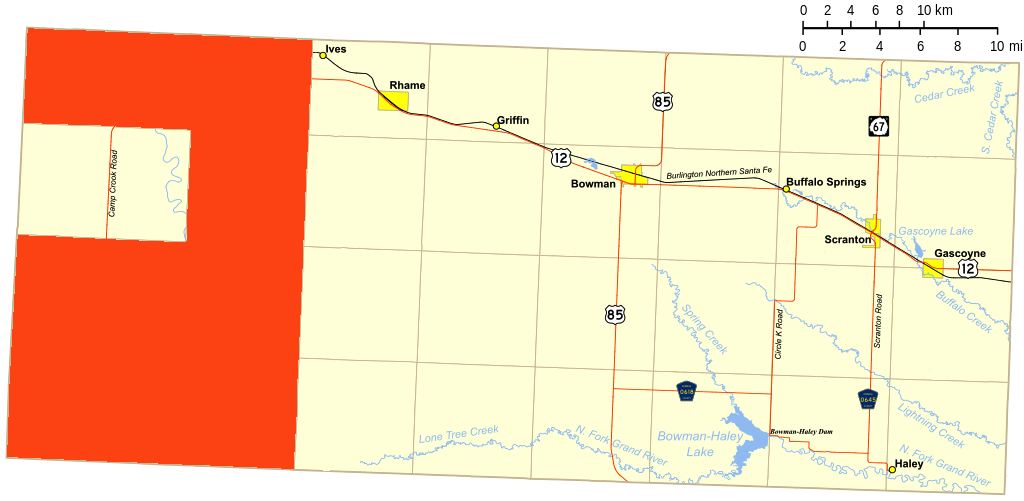
- Location of West Bowman
- Coordinates: 46°02′06″N 103°53′43″W
- Country: United States
- State: North Dakota
- County: Bowman
- Elevation: 2,904 ft (885 m)

Population (2010)
  - Total: 104
- Time zone: UTC-7 (Mountain (MST))
  - Summer (DST): UTC-6 (MDT)
- Area code: 701
- GNIS feature ID: 1036318

West Bowman is an unorganized territory in Bowman County in the U.S. state of North Dakota. As of the 2010 census, its population was 104.
