= Talbot Township, Bowman County, North Dakota =

Talbot Township, North Dakota
- Township
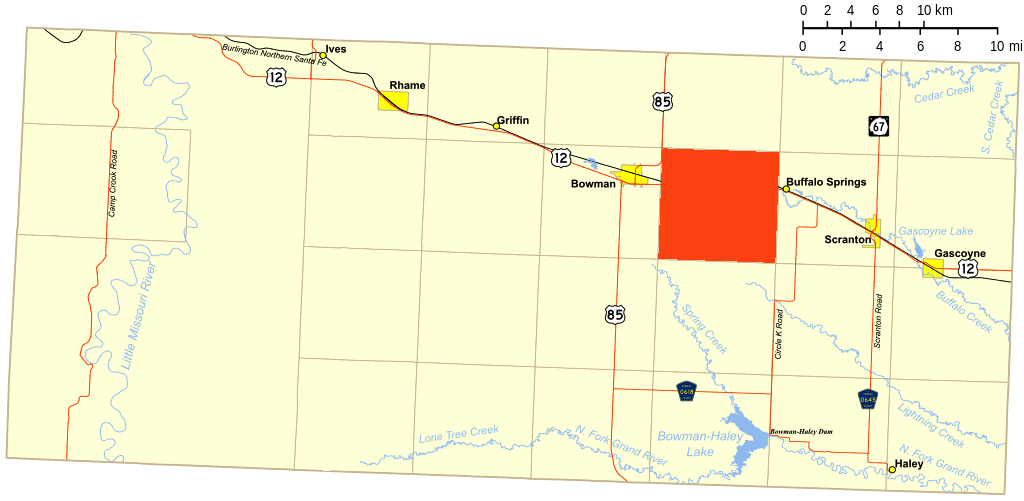
- Location of Talbot Township
- Coordinates: 46°9′13″N 103°41′29″W
- Country: United States
- State: North Dakota
- County: Bowman

Population (2010)
  - Total: 104
- Time zone: UTC-7 (Mountain (MST))
  - Summer (DST): UTC-6 (MDT)

Talbot Township is a civil township in Bowman County in the U.S. state of North Dakota. As of the 2010 census, its population was 104.
