= Bowman County, North Dakota =

County in North Dakota, United States

- County
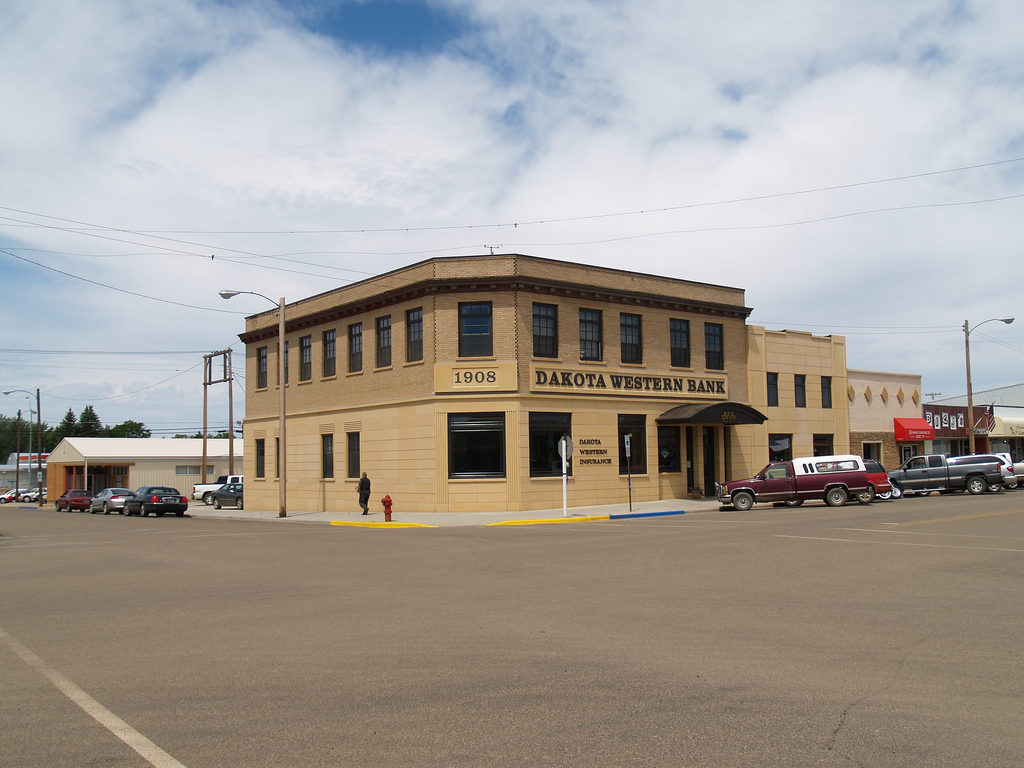
- Dakota Western Bank in Bowman

- Location within the U.S. state of North Dakota
- Coordinates: 46.110144°N 103.505943°W
- Country: United States
- State: North Dakota
- Founded: March 8, 1883 (created); July 5, 1907 (organized)
- Named for: Edward M. Bowman
- Seat: Bowman
- Largest city: Bowman

Area
  - Total: 1,167.054 sq mi (3,022.66 km^{2})
  - Land: 1,161.809 sq mi (3,009.07 km^{2})
  - Water: 5.245 sq mi (13.58 km^{2}) 0.45%

Population (2020)
  - Total: 2,993
  - Estimate (2025): 2,762 ▼
  - Density: 2.484/sq mi (0.959/km^{2})
- Time zone: UTC−7 (Mountain)
  - Summer (DST): UTC−6 (MDT)
- Area code: 701
- Congressional district: At-large
- Website: bowmannd.com/county

Bowman County is a county in the U.S. state of North Dakota. As of the 2020 census, the population was 2,993, and was estimated to be 2,762 in 2025. The county seat and the largest city is Bowman.

== History ==
The legislature of the Dakota Territory designated Bowman (named for Edward M. Bowman, a member of the territorial House of Representatives during the 1883 session) as a separate county on March 8, 1883, although it was not organized at that time. In 1885, its boundaries were altered ceding territory to Billings and Villard Counties (Villard itself was eliminated in 1887). In 1891, and again in 1896, the South Dakota legislature eliminated the not-yet-organized Bowman County, due to scant settlement in the area, but these actions either were not put into effect (the 1891 vote) or were overturned in judicial appeal (the 1896 vote).

A decision by the North Dakota Supreme Court on May 24, 1901, resurrected Bowman County. The decision caused the county's area to slightly increase; its former boundary descriptions were replaced by descriptions based on the boundary lines of adjacent jurisdictions, which added a strip along its south border and another strip along its east border.

Since the scantily populated county was still unorganized, in March 1903 the legislature attached the area to Stark County for judicial purposes. This state of affairs continued until November 1904, when the legislature again dissolved the county and assigned its territory to Billings County. However, on June 10, 1907, ND Governor John Burke issued a proclamation which re-created Bowman County. This proclamation did not attach the area to any other area for judicial purposes. On July 5, 1907, the new county was organized and Bowman was confirmed to be the county seat.

The US Navy ship USS Bowman County (LST-391), a tank landing ship in World War II, was named for the county.

== Geography ==
Bowman County lies at the southwestern corner of North Dakota; its south boundary line abuts the north boundary line of the state of South Dakota, and its west boundary line abuts the east boundary line of the state of Montana. The Little Missouri River flows northward through the west part of the county; the North Fork of the Grand River flows easterly through the lower part of the county, filling Bowman-Haley Lake in the process. Spring Creek flows south-southeasterly through the central part of the county, discharging into Bowman-Haley Lake.

Bowman County's terrain consists of semi-arid high hills running north–south through the west-central part of the county, with lower hills in the remaining territory. The area is partially used for agriculture. The western part slopes to the north and west; the eastern part slopes to the east and south. Its highest point is on the south boundary line, toward its southwestern corner, at 3,228 ft (984 m) ASL.

According to the United States Census Bureau, the county has a total area of 1,167.054 square miles (3,022.66 km^{2}), of which 1,161.809 square miles (3,009.07 km^{2}) is land and 5.245 square miles (13.58 km^{2}) (0.45%) is water. It is the 27th largest county in North Dakota by total area.

=== Major highways ===
- U.S. Highway 12
- U.S. Highway 85
- North Dakota Highway 67

=== Adjacent counties ===
- Slope County - north
- Adams County - east
- Harding County, South Dakota - south
- Fallon County, Montana - west

=== Lakes ===
- Bowman-Haley Lake
- Gascoyne Lake

== Demographics ==
Historical population
Census	Pop.	Note	%±
1910	4,668		—
1920	4,768		2.1%
1930	5,119		7.4%
1940	3,860		−24.6%
1950	4,001		3.7%
1960	4,154		3.8%
1970	3,901		−6.1%
1980	4,229		8.4%
1990	3,596		−15.0%
2000	3,242		−9.8%
2010	3,151		−2.8%
2020	2,993		−5.0%
2025 (est.)	2,762	▼	−7.7%
U.S. Decennial Census; 1790–1960 1900–1990; 1990–2000 2010–2020

As of the fourth quarter of 2024, the median home value in Bowman County was $186,905. As of the 2023 American Community Survey, there are 1,237 estimated households in Bowman County with an average of 2.32 persons per household. The county has a median household income of $83,773. Approximately 9.5% of the county's population lives at or below the poverty line. Bowman County has an estimated 65.2% employment rate, with 27.3% of the population holding a bachelor's degree or higher and 90.2% holding a high school diploma.

The top five reported ancestries (people were allowed to report up to two ancestries, thus the figures will generally add to more than 100%) were English (95.7%), Spanish (2.5%), Indo-European (1.8%), Asian and Pacific Islander (0.0%), and Other (0.0%). The median age in the county was 42.7 years.

Bowman County, North Dakota – racial and ethnic composition
Note: the US Census treats Hispanic/Latino as an ethnic category. This table excludes Latinos from the racial categories and assigns them to a separate category. Hispanics/Latinos may be of any race.

Race / ethnicity (NH = non-Hispanic)	Pop. 1980	Pop. 1990	Pop. 2000	Pop. 2010	Pop. 2020
White alone (NH)	4,204 (99.41%)	3,580 (99.56%)	3,195 (98.55%)	3,039 (96.45%)	2,760 (92.22%)
Black or African American alone (NH)	0 (0.00%)	0 (0.00%)	1 (0.03%)	3 (0.10%)	0 (0.00%)
Native American or Alaska Native alone (NH)	10 (0.24%)	4 (0.11%)	5 (0.15%)	13 (0.41%)	34 (1.14%)
Asian alone (NH)	2 (0.05%)	4 (0.11%)	1 (0.03%)	2 (0.06%)	17 (0.57%)
Pacific Islander alone (NH)	—	—	0 (0.00%)	0 (0.00%)	3 (0.10%)
Other race alone (NH)	7 (0.17%)	2 (0.06%)	0 (0.00%)	0 (0.00%)	0 (0.00%)
Mixed race or multiracial (NH)	—	—	18 (0.56%)	16 (0.51%)	50 (1.67%)
Hispanic or Latino (any race)	6 (0.14%)	6 (0.17%)	22 (0.68%)	78 (2.48%)	129 (4.31%)
Total	4,229 (100.00%)	3,596 (100.00%)	3,242 (100.00%)	3,151 (100.00%)	2,993 (100.00%)

=== 2024 estimate ===
As of the 2024 estimate, there were 2,886 people and 1,237 households residing in the county. There were 1,638 housing units at an average density of 1.41 per square mile (0.5/km^{2}). The racial makeup of the county was 94.8% White (91.8% NH White), 0.6% African American, 2.9% Native American, 0.1% Asian, 0.1% Pacific Islander, _% from some other races and 1.5% from two or more races. Hispanic or Latino people of any race were 4.8% of the population.

=== 2020 census ===
As of the 2020 census, there were 2,993 people, 1,294 households, and 835 families residing in the county. The population density was 2.6 inhabitants per square mile (1.0/km^{2}). There were 1,633 housing units at an average density of 1.41 per square mile (0.5/km^{2}).

Of the residents, 23.4% were under the age of 18 and 23.6% were 65 years of age or older; the median age was 43.8 years. For every 100 females there were 104.9 males, and for every 100 females age 18 and over there were 105.6 males.

The racial makeup of the county was 93.3% White, 0.0% Black or African American, 1.2% American Indian and Alaska Native, 0.6% Asian, 1.3% from some other race, and 3.5% from two or more races. Hispanic or Latino residents of any race comprised 4.3% of the population.

There were 1,294 households in the county, of which 26.6% had children under the age of 18 living with them and 19.7% had a female householder with no spouse or partner present. About 30.1% of all households were made up of individuals and 16.2% had someone living alone who was 65 years of age or older.

There were 1,633 housing units, of which 20.8% were vacant. Among occupied housing units, 76.4% were owner-occupied and 23.6% were renter-occupied. The homeowner vacancy rate was 2.2% and the rental vacancy rate was 15.3%.

=== 2010 census ===
As of the 2010 census, there were 3,151 people, 1,385 households, and 873 families residing in the county. The population density was 2.7 inhabitants per square mile (1.0/km^{2}). There were 1,683 housing units at an average density of 1.45 per square mile (0.6/km^{2}). The racial makeup of the county was 97.91% White, 0.10% African American, 0.57% Native American, 0.06% Asian, 0.00% Pacific Islander, 0.86% from some other races and 0.51% from two or more races. Hispanic or Latino people of any race were 2.48% of the population. In terms of ancestry, 47.4% were German, 28.1% were Norwegian, 9.9% were Irish, 6.4% were Swedish, 6.4% were English, 5.4% were American, and 5.2% were Polish.

Of the 1,385 households, 25.6% had children under the age of 18 living with them, 54.9% were married couples living together, 4.4% had a female householder with no husband present, 37.0% were non-families, and 32.9% of all households were made up of individuals. The average household size was 2.22 and the average family size was 2.82. The median age was 46.9 years.

The median income for a household in the county was $48,063 and the median income for a family was $63,897. Males had a median income of $41,542 versus $27,269 for females. The per capita income for the county was $27,354. About 3.9% of families and 6.7% of the population were below the poverty line, including 2.6% of those under age 18 and 14.8% of those age 65 or over.

== Communities ==
Detailed map of Bowman County

=== Cities ===
- Bowman (county seat)
- Gascoyne
- Rhame
- Scranton

=== Unincorporated communities ===
- Griffin
- Haley

=== Townships ===
- Adelaide
- Amor
- Bowman
- Boyesen
- Buena Vista
- Fischbein
- Gascoyne
- Gem
- Goldfield
- Grainbelt
- Grand River
- Haley
- Ladd
- Langberg
- Marion
- Minnehaha
- Nebo
- Rhame
- Scranton
- Star
- Stillwater
- Sunny Slope
- Talbot
- Whiting

=== Unorganized Territories ===
- Hart
- West Bowman

== Politics ==
Bowman County voters have been reliably Republican for decades. In no national election since 1964 has the county selected the Democratic Party candidate (as of 2024).

United States presidential election results for Bowman County, North Dakota
Year	Republican		Democratic		Third party(ies)	
Year	No.	%	No.	%	No.	%
1908	451	66.13%	209	30.65%	22	3.23%
1912	302	29.18%	361	34.88%	372	35.94%
1916	374	32.49%	685	59.51%	92	7.99%
1920	1,192	69.79%	321	18.79%	195	11.42%
1924	776	45.17%	67	3.90%	875	50.93%
1928	1,031	54.99%	821	43.79%	23	1.23%
1932	616	28.31%	1,292	59.38%	268	12.32%
1936	534	26.57%	1,118	55.62%	358	17.81%
1940	927	50.63%	882	48.17%	22	1.20%
1944	785	55.67%	609	43.19%	16	1.13%
1948	723	49.83%	597	41.14%	131	9.03%
1952	1,375	71.21%	540	27.96%	16	0.83%
1956	1,007	58.34%	715	41.43%	4	0.23%
1960	1,038	54.98%	847	44.86%	3	0.16%
1964	756	41.38%	1,070	58.57%	1	0.05%
1968	927	56.46%	559	34.04%	156	9.50%
1972	1,111	61.69%	643	35.70%	47	2.61%
1976	1,033	51.70%	911	45.60%	54	2.70%
1980	1,507	70.49%	454	21.23%	177	8.28%
1984	1,559	72.55%	562	26.15%	28	1.30%
1988	1,111	59.51%	737	39.48%	19	1.02%
1992	712	37.34%	506	26.53%	689	36.13%
1996	710	48.20%	489	33.20%	274	18.60%
2000	1,080	73.42%	330	22.43%	61	4.15%
2004	1,280	74.59%	397	23.14%	39	2.27%
2008	1,107	67.50%	478	29.15%	55	3.35%
2012	1,280	73.69%	414	23.83%	43	2.48%
2016	1,446	80.92%	227	12.70%	114	6.38%
2020	1,395	84.19%	228	13.76%	34	2.05%
2024	1,384	85.54%	207	12.79%	27	1.67%

== See also ==
- Bowman County School District 1
- National Register of Historic Places listings in Bowman County, North Dakota
- Bowman-Haley Dam
