= Jonathan Fishbein =

American physician

Jonathan Fishbein is an American physician and former director of the National Institutes of Health (NIH) Office for Policy in Clinical Research Operations. In 2005, Fishbein alleged that an NIH-funded clinical trial of the antiretroviral drug nevirapine, conducted in Africa, was invalid because of poor data collection, faulty record-keeping, and lax quality control. The NIH subsequently attempted to fire Fishbein, and he sought protection as a whistleblower.

The clinical trial in question was the HIVNET 012 study, which tested the antiretroviral drug nevirapine, used in some developing countries as a cost-effective method to prevent transmission of HIV from mother to unborn child. Fishbein was among several NIH employees to raise concerns about the study; he alleged that the NIH had become "so heavily invested in the trial's outcome" that it had lost objectivity about the quality of the result. Internal NIH documents showed that concerns had been raised about HIVNET012, but that the Institute did not notify the Bush Administration before the launch of a major project to subsidize nevirapine use in Africa to combat the spread of HIV. The NIH subsequently attempted to fire Fishbein; he alleged that the attempted dismissal was in retaliation for his complaints about HIVNET 012, while the agency cited poor performance during a probationary period as the cause for firing.

In addition to his concerns about nevirapene, Fishbein also alleged that the drug was being improperly tested on foster children. He further complained that female staff at NIH were being sexually harassed.

The NIH claim that Fishbein had unperformed at his position was undermined by Fishbein having been recommended for a cash performance bonus mere weeks before the attempt to terminate him.

In response to the allegations about nevirapene launched by Fishbein and others, the Institute of Medicine conducted an independent review of HIVNET 012 methodology and findings. The institute's review concluded that nevirapine was safe and effective in the prevention of mother-to-child HIV transmission, as HIVNET 012 had found, and that the study's methodology was sufficiently sound that scientists and policy-makers could rely on the study's findings.
