= Anna Fishbeyn =

Russian-American actress, writer and filmmaker

- Born: November 2, 1983 (age 42); Russia
- Education: The New School (MFA); Columbia University (PhD)
- Occupations: Actress; Writer; Director; Producer; Comedian
- Years active: 2010–present
- Known for: Galaxy 360: A Woman's Playground
- Website: movement360.tv//

Anna Fishbeyn (born November 2, 1983) is a Russian-American actress, writer, and filmmaker. She has a Ph.D. from Columbia University and is the founder of the production companies XOFeminist Productions and Anteriya Films. Her work often uses satire to explore themes of feminism, motherhood, and the immigrant experience.

Her body of work includes the Off-Broadway play My Stubborn Tongue, the novel The Matrimonial Flirtations of Emma Kaulfield, and the feature film Galaxy 360: A Woman's Playground.

== Early life and education ==
=== Childhood in the Soviet Union and immigration ===
Fishbeyn was born in Russia toward the end of the Soviet era. Her family, who are Russian Jews, applied for permission to emigrate, which resulted in a period of surveillance by the KGB. They fled to the United States as political refugees in the early 1980s, eventually settling in Chicago. The family faced challenges, including anti-Russian sentiment in America, and her educated parents had to take less prestigious jobs due to the language barrier.

=== Academic career ===
Fishbeyn received a Master of Fine Arts in Fiction from The New School.

She completed her education with a Ph.D. in Philosophy of Education from Columbia University. Her doctoral dissertation was titled Evil in the Novel and Its Implications for Moral Education. Her academic research, particularly into feminist philosophers like Judith Butler, informed the creation of her first play, Sex in Mommyville.

== Theater career ==
Fishbeyn's return to performing was prompted by a medical emergency during the birth of her son, which she has described as a catalyst for pursuing her artistic ambitions.

=== Sex in Mommyville ===
Her debut play, Sex in Mommyville (2010), is a comedic one-woman show about an artist and mother juggling her career, family, and personal life. Inspired by her own experiences, the play uses humor to address societal pressures on women. It was first performed at New York's The Flea Theater and later at other venues, including La MaMa Experimental Theatre Club. A review in Backstage noted her "charm to burn, as well as charisma, intelligence, and a wholesome sexiness" that made the character relatable.

=== My Stubborn Tongue ===
Fishbeyn's second play, My Stubborn Tongue, is an autobiographical solo show about her family's immigration story. In the play, she portrays 17 different characters to explore her journey between Russian-Jewish and American cultures.

The play ran Off-Broadway at the New Ohio Theatre in New York around 2014 and later had its London premiere on the West End at the Soho Theatre. A TheaterMania review called it a "funny and charming immigrant's tale" but criticized the production for a lengthy run time and "forced affectation".

== Film and television career ==
=== Web series and short films ===
Fishbeyn created the comedic web series Happy Hour Feminism, which used gender-reversal scenarios for satirical purposes. The series was an official selection at numerous film festivals and won several awards.

She also wrote, directed, and starred in the short musical film Invisible Alice, about sex trafficking. The film won multiple awards on the festival circuit, including Best Musical at the Action On Film International Film Festival and Best Director at the International Film Festival Milan and the Moscow Independent Film Festival.

=== Feature film: Galaxy 360: A Woman's Playground ===
Fishbeyn's feature film debut, Galaxy 360: A Woman's Playground, is a sci-fi comedy she wrote, directed, and starred in. Set in 2195 in a matriarchal society, the film centers on a male beauty pageant. Fishbeyn plays Illumina, the host of the pageant.

The film screened at festivals including the Cannes Film Festival and was a finalist at the Sundance New Frontier Exhibition. A review in Movie Marker described Fishbeyn as a "welcome talent" with "ferocious passion" but found the film "a tad too long".

=== Works in development ===
Fishbeyn has a feature film titled How to Seduce Your Dinner Guest and two television pilots, Healthy Nuts and Infidelity Club, in development.

== Writing career ==
Fishbeyn's debut novel, The Matrimonial Flirtations of Emma Kaulfield, was released in 2017 by Arcade Publishing, an imprint of Simon & Schuster. The book is a satirical story about a Russian Jewish immigrant in New York.

== Personal life ==
Fishbeyn has two children. She has cited the near-death experience during her son's birth as the pivotal event that motivated her to pursue a career as a performer.

== Works and accolades ==
=== Selected works ===
Year	Title	Medium	Role(s)
2010	Sex in Mommyville	Play	Writer, Performer
c. 2014	My Stubborn Tongue	Play	Writer, Performer
c. 2015	Happy Hour Feminism	Web Series	Writer, Star, Producer
2017	The Matrimonial Flirtations of Emma Kaulfield	Novel	Author
c. 2017	Invisible Alice	Short Film	Director, Star
2023	Galaxy 360: A Woman's Playground	Feature Film	Writer, Director, Star

=== Awards and recognition ===
Project	Award/Recognition	Awarding Body / Film Festival
Happy Hour Feminism	Best Web Series, Best Comedy, Best Screenplay, Best Actress	Multiple Festivals
Invisible Alice	Best Actress	Moscow Independent Film Festival
Invisible Alice	Best Director	Moscow Independent Film Festival; International Film Festival Milan
Invisible Alice	Best Musical	Action on Film Festival
Galaxy 360: A Woman's Playground	Finalist	Sundance New Frontier Exhibition
