= Klaus Kærgård =

Danish footballer (born 1976)

Klaus Kærgaard
Personal information
- Full name: Klaus Kærgaard
- Date of birth: 21 October 1976 (age 50)
- Place of birth: Holstebro, Denmark
- Height: 1.80 m (5 ft 11 in)
- Positions: Winger; attacking midfielder

Senior career*
Years	Team	Apps	(Gls)
1997–2005	Viborg FF	161	(38)
2005–2008	FC Midtjylland	10	(0)
Total		171	(38)
- * Club domestic league appearances and goals

Klaus Kærgaard (born 21 October 1976) is a Danish retired professional football, who most notably won the 2000 Danish Cup with Viborg FF. He was a forward for Danish clubs Viborg FF and FC Midtjylland. From 1998 to 2007, Kærgård played a combined total 171 games and scored 38 goals in the Danish Superliga championship for the two teams. He ended his career prematurely in 2007, due to injuries.

== Career statistics ==
=== Club ===
As of 24 May 2008.

Appearances and goals by club, season and competition
Club	Season	League			Continental (Note: UEFA Europa League and qualifiers)		Total	
Club	Season	Division	Apps	Goals	Apps	Goals	Apps	Goals
Viborg FF	1997–98	Danish Superliga	—		—		—	
Viborg FF	1998–99	Danish Superliga	24	5	—		24	5
Viborg FF	1999–2000	Danish Superliga	14	1	—		14	1
Viborg FF	2000–01	Danish Superliga	25	6	3	1	28	7
Viborg FF	2001–02	Danish Superliga	24	3	—		24	3
Viborg FF	2002–03	Danish Superliga	17	7	—		17	7
Viborg FF	2003–04	Danish Superliga	31	11	—		31	11
Viborg FF	2004–05	Danish Superliga	26	5	—		26	5
Viborg FF	Total		161	38	3	1	164	39
FC Midtjylland	2005–06	Danish Superliga	7	0	2	0	9	0
FC Midtjylland	2006–07	Danish Superliga	3	0	—		3	0
FC Midtjylland	2007–08	Danish Superliga	—		—		—	
FC Midtjylland	Total		10	0	2	0	12	0
Career total			171	38	5	1	176	39

== Honours ==
Viborg FF

- Danish Cup: 1999–2000
- Danish Super Cup: 2000
