= Edward M. Bowman (politician) =

American politician (fl. 1883)

Edward M. Bowman was a member of the Dakota Territory House of Representatives and the namesake of Bowman County, North Dakota. Bowman served the southern part of the territory during the 1883 legislative session, during which the county was established.
