= Gascoyne, North Dakota =

Gascoyne
- City
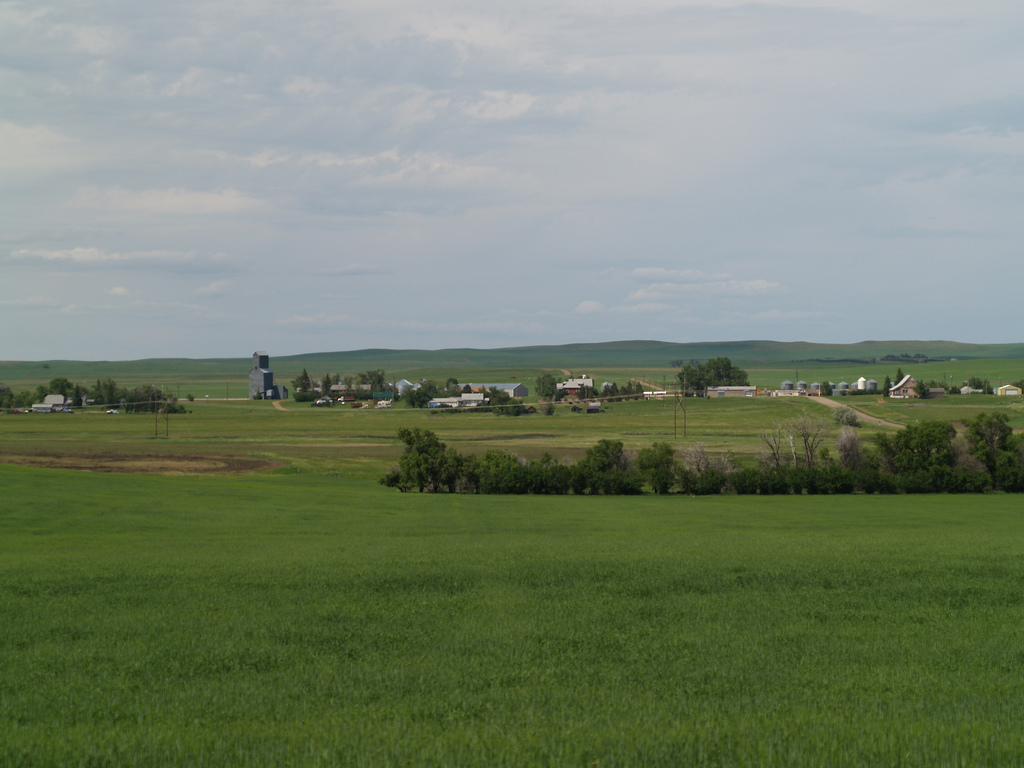
- Gascoyne

- Location of Gascoyne, North Dakota
- Coordinates: 46°07′08″N 103°04′44″W
- Country: United States
- State: North Dakota
- County: Bowman
- Founded: 1907

Area
  - Total: 1.00 sq mi (2.59 km^{2})
  - Land: 1.00 sq mi (2.59 km^{2})
  - Water: 0 sq mi (0.00 km^{2})
- Elevation: 2,762 ft (842 m)

Population (2020)
  - Total: 21
  - Estimate (2022): 21
  - Density: 21.0/sq mi (8.12/km^{2})
- Time zone: UTC–7 (Mountain (MST))
  - Summer (DST): UTC–6 (MDT)
- ZIP code: 58653
- Area code: 701
- FIPS code: 38-29540
- GNIS feature ID: 1036053

Gascoyne is a city in Bowman County, North Dakota, United States. The population was 21 at the 2020 census.

== History ==
The city was founded in 1907 and known originally as Fischbein before the name was changed to Gascoyne on March 25, 1908. The new name came from a construction foreman on the Milwaukee Road transcontinental rail line that was built through the city, though an alternate explanation suggests that the name refers to the large deposits of natural gas found in the area.

Reserves of lignite coal are also found in the area, and Gascoyne was the site of a coal mine for much of the 20th century. The most active period for the mine occurred between 1975 and 1995, when about 2.5 million tons of lignite were produced per year, primarily for the Big Stone Power Plant near Big Stone City, South Dakota. The mine began ceasing production in 1995, and was shut down completely in 1997. In 2001, Westmoreland Coal Company purchased the mine with an intent to resume mining and construct a 500 megawatt power plant on site. These plans were later suspended in 2008 due to environmental concerns.

== Geography ==
According to the United States Census Bureau, the city has a total area of 1.00 square mile (2.59 km^{2}), all land.

== Demographics ==
Historical population
Census	Pop.	Note	%±
1920	60		—
1930	97		61.7%
1940	48		−50.5%
1950	76		58.3%
1960	50		−34.2%
1970	34		−32.0%
1980	23		−32.4%
1990	22		−4.3%
2000	23		4.5%
2010	16		−30.4%
2020	21		31.3%
2022 (est.)	21		0.0%
U.S. Decennial Census; 2020 Census

=== 2010 census ===
As of the census of 2010, there were 16 people in 9 households, including 5 families, in the city. The population density was 16.0 inhabitants per square mile (6.2/km^{2}). There were 10 housing units at an average density of 10.0 per square mile (3.9/km^{2}). The racial makeup of the city was 100.0% White.

Of the 9 households 11.1% had children under the age of 18 living with them, 55.6% were married couples living together, and 44.4% were non-families. 44.4% of households were one person and 11.1% were one person aged 65 or older. The average household size was 1.78 and the average family size was 2.40.

The median age was 63.5 years. 12.5% of residents were under the age of 18; 0.0% were between the ages of 18 and 24; 25.1% were from 25 to 44; 18.8% were from 45 to 64; and 43.8% were 65 or older. The gender makeup of the city was 62.5% male and 37.5% female.

=== 2000 census ===
As of the census of 2000, there were 23 people in 9 households, including 8 families, in the city. The population density was 23.3 people per square mile (9.0/km^{2}). There were 15 housing units at an average density of 15.2 per square mile (5.8/km^{2}). The racial makup of the city was 100.00% White.

Of the 9 households 22.2% had children under the age of 18 living with them, 66.7% were married couples living together, 11.1% had a female householder with no husband present, and 11.1% were non-families. No households were one person and none had someone living alone who was 65 or older. The average household size was 2.56 and the average family size was 2.50.

The age distribution was 30.4% under the age of 18, 8.7% from 25 to 44, 26.1% from 45 to 64, and 34.8% 65 or older. The median age was 60 years. For every 100 females, there were 130.0 males. For every 100 females aged 18 and over, there were 128.6 males.

The median household income was $23,750 and the median family income was $23,750. Males had a median income of $27,500 versus $13,750 for females. The per capita income for the city was $10,206. There are 18.2% of families living below the poverty line and 30.3% of the population, including 50.0% of under eighteens and none of those over 64.
