= Vallhall Arena =

Multi-purpose indoor arena in Oslo, Norway

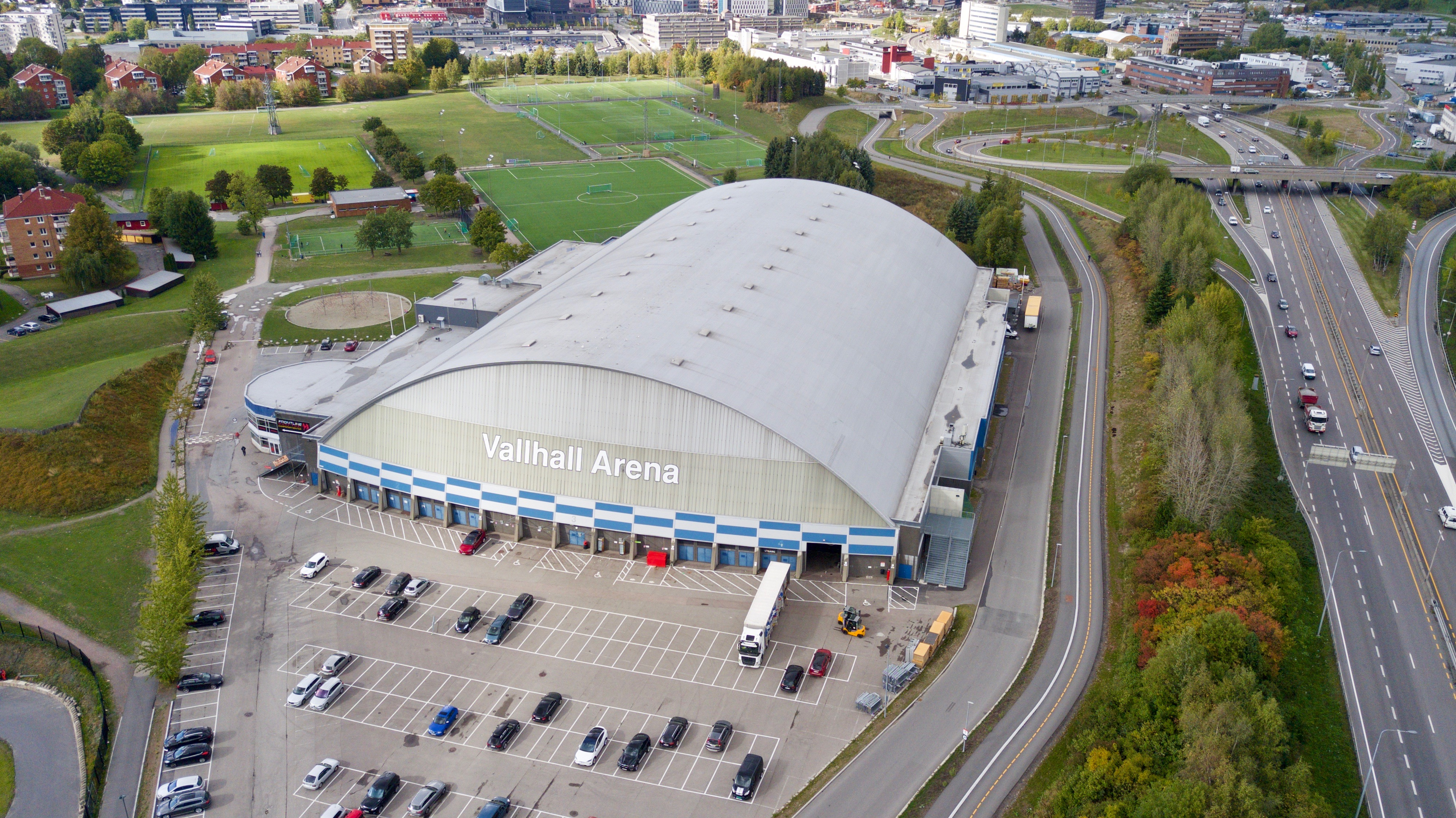
- Interactive map of Vallhall Arena
- Location: Valle-Hovin, Oslo, Norway
- Coordinates: 59.9204°N 10.8061°E
- Capacity: 5,500 (football); 12,500 (concerts)
- Surface: Artificial turf

Construction
- Opened: 2001
- Architect: Biong Arkitekter

Tenant
- Vålerenga Fotball

Vallhall Arena is a multi-purpose indoor arena, located in Valle-Hovin, Oslo, Norway. The stadium has a capacity of 5,500 people during matches. The Tippeligaen club Vålerenga uses the arena for training and friendly matches in the winter off-season.

The arena is made of artificial grass turf with a floor space of about 9000 square metres. It is mostly used for football matches, but it is also known for hosting events such as fairs and concerts.

When used as a concert hall, the arena has a capacity of up to 12,500 people. It's not far away from Valle Hovin, an outdoor concert arena. On 22 April 2001, Irish vocal pop band Westlife held a concert for their Where Dreams Come True Tour supporting their album Coast to Coast.

== See also ==
- List of indoor arenas in Norway
- List of indoor arenas in Nordic countries
