= Lillian Desow-Fishbein =

American painter

- Born: Lillian Desow; 1921; Detroit, Michigan, United States
- Died: August 6, 2004
- Occupation: Painter
- Notable work: The New Image Series

Lillian Desow-Fishbein (1921 – August 6, 2004) was an American painter who was active with the National Council of Jewish Women, American Jewish Congress, and the Art Institute Associates. In 1968, she and her husband, Jack Fishbein, traveled to Ethiopia to help raise awareness of the plight of Ethiopian Jews. She had two children, and taught art for 38 years. Her parents moved to the United States in 1920 from Poland, and she was the first child of a family of nine born in America. She attended Cass Technical High School in Detroit, and was later awarded an art scholarship to Cranbrook in Michigan.

Her work is held by the Smithsonian American Art Museum and the Detroit Institute of Arts.
