= Anne Fishbein =

American photographer (born 1958)

Anne Fishbein (born 1958) is an American photographer. Fishbein was born in Chicago, Illinois.

Her work is included in the collections of the Art Institute of Chicago, the San Francisco Museum of Modern Art and the National Gallery of Canada.
