= Fischbein Township, North Dakota =

- Township
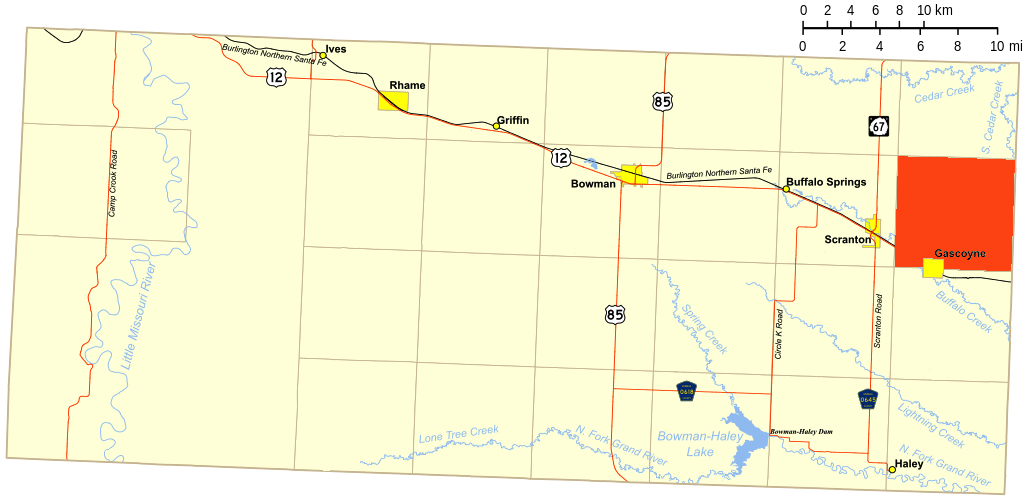
- Location of Fischbein Township
- Coordinates: 46°9′09″N 103°03′36″W
- Country: United States
- State: North Dakota
- County: Bowman

Population (2010)
  - Total: 15
- Time zone: UTC-7 (Mountain (MST))
  - Summer (DST): UTC-6 (MDT)

Fischbein Township is a township in Bowman County in the U.S. state of North Dakota. Its population during the 2010 Census was 15.
