= Eric Fischbein =

Swedish footballer

Personal information
- Full name: Eric Fischbein
- Date of birth: 11 March 1976 (age 50)
- Place of birth: Malmö, Sweden
- Height: 1.77 m (5 ft 10 in)
- Position: Midfielder

Youth career
- 1986–1995: SK Hakoah Malmö

Senior career*
Years	Team	Apps	(Gls)
1996–1997	Hammarby IF	3	(0)
1998–2002	IFK Malmö	116	(11)
2003–2004	Trelleborgs FF	54	(8)
2005–2006	Hammarby IF	26	(1)
2008–2010	Andrea Doria	–	(–)
2010–2013	IK Makkabi	–	(–)
- * Club domestic league appearances and goals as of 9 January 2013

Eric Fischbein (born 11 March 1976) is a Swedish former football midfielder who last represented IK Makkabi Fotboll in Stockholm. He played for Hammarby IF until the 2007 season and, in 2008, he played with fifth tier club FC Andrea Doria from Stockholm.

Fischbein, who is Jewish, was the first person to receive the AGO-award, which goes to outstanding Jewish sports performers in Sweden and is presented by the Jewish sports society IK Makkabi.
