= 2019 Eliteserien =

75th season of top-tier football league in Norway

Eliteserien
- Season: 2019
- Dates: 30 March – 1 December
- Champions: Molde; 4th title
- Relegated: Lillestrøm; Tromsø; Ranheim
- Champions League: Molde
- Europa League: Bodø/Glimt; Rosenborg; Viking
- Matches: 240
- Goals: 699 (2.91 per match)
- Top goalscorer: Torgeir Børven (21 goals)
- Biggest home win: Vålerenga 6–0 Bodø/Glimt (5 July 2019); Strømsgodset 6–0 Brann (24 November 2019)
- Biggest away win: Ranheim 1–5 Vålerenga (12 May 2019); Strømsgodset 0–4 Molde (22 June 2019); Brann 1–5 Viking (1 December 2019)
- Highest scoring: Mjøndalen 4–5 Bodø/Glimt (6 April 2019)
- Longest winning run: Bodø/Glimt, Kristiansund, Molde, Odd (4 games)
- Longest unbeaten run: Molde (14 games)
- Longest winless run: Vålerenga (12 games)
- Longest losing run: Tromsø (5 games)
- Highest attendance: 17,799; Rosenborg 0–2 Haugesund (16 May 2019)
- Lowest attendance: 1,353; Ranheim 0–2 Haugesund (14 April 2019)
- Average attendance: 5,773 ▼1.6%
- All statistics correct as of 1 December 2019.

The 2019 Eliteserien was the 75th season of top-tier football in Norway. This was third season of Eliteserien as rebranding from Tippeligaen.

The season began on 30 March and was scheduled to end 30 November 2019, not including play-off matches, but due to Rosenborg competing in the Europa League the final matchday was moved to 1 December. Fixtures for the 2019 season were announced on 19 December 2018. Rosenborg were the defending champions. Viking and Mjøndalen joined as the promoted clubs from the 2018 1. divisjon. They replaced Sandefjord and Start who were relegated to the 2019 1. divisjon.

Molde won their fourth title, with two matches to spare following a 4–0 home win against Strømsgodset on 10 November 2019.

== Overview ==
=== Summary ===
On 10 November, Molde were confirmed as Eliteserien champions following their 4–0 home win against Strømsgodset in the 28th round. They won their fourth title.

== Teams ==
Sixteen teams compete in the league – the top fourteen teams from the previous season, and two teams promoted from 1. divisjon. The promoted teams were Viking and Mjøndalen, returning to the top flight after an absence of one and three years respectively. They replaced Sandefjord (after a two-year spell in Eliteserien) and Start (relegated after a season's presence).

=== Stadiums and locations ===
Locations of the teams in 2019 Eliteserien

Note: Table lists in alphabetical order.

Team	Ap.	Location	Arena	Turf	Capacity
Bodø/Glimt	24	Bodø	Aspmyra Stadion	Artificial	5,635
Brann	62	Bergen	Brann Stadion	Natural	17,049
Haugesund	13	Haugesund	Haugesund Stadion	Natural	8,754
Kristiansund	3	Kristiansund	Kristiansund Stadion	Artificial	4,444
Lillestrøm	56	Lillestrøm	Åråsen Stadion	Natural	11,500
Mjøndalen	20	Mjøndalen	Consto Arena	Artificial	4,200
Molde	43	Molde	Aker Stadion	Artificial	11,249
Odd	38	Skien	Skagerak Arena	Artificial	11,767
Ranheim	9	Trondheim	Extra Arena	Artificial	3,000
Rosenborg	56	Trondheim	Lerkendal Stadion	Natural	21,421
Sarpsborg 08	8	Sarpsborg	Sarpsborg Stadion	Artificial	8,022
Stabæk	23	Bærum	Nadderud Stadion	Natural	4,938
Strømsgodset	32	Drammen	Marienlyst Stadion	Artificial	8,935
Tromsø	32	Tromsø	Alfheim Stadion	Artificial	6,687
Viking	69	Stavanger	Viking Stadion	Artificial	15,900
Vålerenga	59	Oslo	Intility Arena	Artificial	16,555

=== Personnel and kits ===
Team	Manager	Captain	Kit manufacturer	Sponsor
Bodø/Glimt	(Norway) Kjetil Knutsen	(Brazil) Ricardo	Diadora	Sparebanken Nord-Norge
Brann	(Norway) Lars Arne Nilsen	(Netherlands) Vito Wormgoor	Nike	Sparebanken Vest
Haugesund	(Norway) Jostein Grindhaug	(Norway) Christian Grindheim	Macron	Haugaland Kraft
Kristiansund	(Norway) Christian Michelsen	(Norway) Dan Peter Ulvestad	Macron	SpareBank 1 Nordvest
Lillestrøm	(Sweden) Jörgen Lennartsson	(Norway) Frode Kippe	Puma	DNB
Mjøndalen	(Norway) Vegard Hansen	(Norway) Christian Gauseth	Umbro	Sparebanken Øst
Molde	(Norway) Erling Moe	(Norway) Ruben Gabrielsen	Nike	Sparebanken Møre
Odd	(Norway) Dag-Eilev Fagermo	(Norway) Steffen Hagen	Hummel	SpareBank 1 Telemark
Ranheim	(Norway) Svein Maalen	(Norway) Mads Reginiussen	Umbro	SpareBank 1 SMN
Rosenborg	(Norway) Eirik Horneland	(Denmark) Mike Jensen	Adidas	SpareBank 1 SMN
Sarpsborg 08	(Norway) Geir Bakke	(Norway) Joachim Thomassen	Select	Borregaard
Stabæk	(Sweden) Jan Jönsson	(Norway) Andreas Hanche-Olsen	Macron	SpareBank 1 Østlandet
Strømsgodset	(Denmark) Henrik Pedersen	(Norway) Jakob Glesnes	Puma	DNB
Tromsø	(Finland) Simo Valakari	(Norway) Simen Wangberg	Select	Sparebanken Nord-Norge
Viking	(Norway) Bjarne Berntsen	(Norway) Zlatko Tripić	Diadora	Lyse
Vålerenga	(Norway) Ronny Deila	(Ghana) Adam Larsen Kwarasey	Umbro	DNB

=== Managerial changes ===
Team	Outgoing manager	Manner of departure	Date of vacancy	Table	Incoming manager	Date of appointment	Table
Rosenborg	(Netherlands) Rini Coolen	End of interim period	31 December 2018	Pre-season	(Norway) Eirik Horneland	9 January 2019	Pre-season
Haugesund	(Norway) Eirik Horneland	Signed by Rosenborg	7 January 2018	Pre-season	(Norway) Jostein Grindhaug	8 January 2019	Pre-season
Molde	(Norway) Ole Gunnar Solskjær	Signed by Manchester United	28 March 2019	Pre-season	(Norway) Erling Moe (Note: Solskjær was initially appointed as caretaker manager of Manchester United on 19 December 2018 by loan until June 2019, and Moe was appointed as caretaker manager until Solskjær's expected return in June, but Solskjær was ultimately signed with Manchester United. Moe was appointed as permanent manager on 29 April 2019.)	29 April 2019	Pre-season
Strømsgodset	(Norway) Bjørn Petter Ingebretsen	Health reasons	15 May 2019	14th	(Norway) Håkon Wibe-Lund (interim)	15 May 2019	14th
Stabæk	(Norway) Henning Berg	Signed by Omonia	6 June 2019	15th	(Sweden) Jan Jönsson	11 June 2019	15th
Strømsgodset	(Norway) Håkon Wibe-Lund (interim)	End of interim period	20 June 2019	15th	(Denmark) Henrik Pedersen	20 June 2019	15th
Lillestrøm	(Sweden) Jörgen Lennartsson	Sacked	2 December 2019	14th	(Norway) Tom Nordlie (interim)	3 December 2019	14th

== League table ==
Pos	Team	Pld	W	D	L	GF	GA	GD	Pts	Qualification or relegation
1	Molde (C)	30	21	5	4	72	31	+41	68	Qualification for the Champions League first qualifying round
2	Bodø/Glimt	30	15	9	6	64	44	+20	54	Qualification for the Europa League first qualifying round
3	Rosenborg	30	14	10	6	53	41	+12	52	Qualification for the Europa League first qualifying round
4	Odd	30	15	7	8	45	40	+5	52	
5	Viking	30	13	8	9	55	42	+13	47	Qualification for the Europa League second qualifying round (Note: Viking qualified for the Europa League second qualifying round as winners of the 2019 Norwegian Cup.)
6	Kristiansund	30	11	8	11	41	41	0	41	
7	Haugesund	30	9	13	8	44	37	+7	40	
8	Stabæk	30	10	10	10	38	36	+2	40	
9	Brann	30	10	10	10	32	37	−5	40	
10	Vålerenga	30	8	10	12	39	44	−5	34	
11	Strømsgodset	30	8	8	14	41	54	−13	32	
12	Sarpsborg 08	30	5	15	10	30	40	−10	30	
13	Mjøndalen	30	6	12	12	38	52	−14	30	
14	Lillestrøm (R)	30	7	9	14	32	47	−15	30	Qualification for the relegation play-offs
15	Tromsø (R)	30	8	6	16	39	58	−19	30	Relegation to First Division
16	Ranheim (R)	30	7	6	17	36	55	−19	27	Relegation to First Division

Source: Football Association of Norway (in Norwegian), Soccerway
Rules for classification: 1) Points; 2) Goal difference; 3) Goals scored; 4) Head-to-head points; 5) Head-to-head goal difference; 6) Head-to-head away goals scored (only if between two teams); 7) Head-to-head goals scored; 8) Play-off (only used to decide champions or relegation).
(C) Champions; (R) Relegated

== Relegation play-offs ==
The 14th-placed team, Lillestrøm takes part in a two-legged play-off against Start, the winners of the 1. divisjon promotion play-offs, to decide who will play in the 2020 Eliteserien.

7 December 2019
18:00 CET (UTC+1)

Start	2–1	Lillestrøm
Sigurðarson 54' (pen.), 69'	Report	Gustavsson 28'

Sør Arena, Kristiansand
Attendance: 4,013
Referee: Trygve Kjensli
11 December 2019
19:00 CET (UTC+1)

Lillestrøm	4–3	Start
Mikalsen 2'; Lowe 22' (o.g.); Gustavsson 49'; Melgalvis 61'	Report	Ramsland 76', 79', 82'

Åråsen Stadion, Lillestrøm
Attendance: 7,892
Referee: Ola Hobber Nilsen

Lillestrøm lost on the away goals rule after 5–5 on aggregate and were relegated to 1. divisjon.

== Results ==
Home \ Away	BOD	BRA	HAU	KRI	LIL	MIF	MOL	ODD	RAN	ROS	SRP	STB	STM	TRO	VÅL	VIK
Bodø/Glimt	—	1–2	2–2	3–0	4–0	0–0	3–2	3–0	5–1	2–0	1–1	3–3	2–0	4–0	4–0	2–1
Brann	1–1	—	0–0	2–1	1–0	0–0	0–0	1–0	0–1	0–1	2–1	2–1	1–1	2–3	1–1	1–5
Haugesund	1–1	1–1	—	0–0	0–2	0–0	1–2	4–1	0–1	2–1	1–1	3–0	2–2	5–1	1–4	1–0
Kristiansund	1–2	1–0	2–2	—	5–2	4–0	3–2	1–1	0–0	2–2	4–0	0–1	1–2	1–0	2–0	4–2
Lillestrøm	0–0	1–3	1–0	1–1	—	3–2	0–2	0–3	2–1	1–1	0–0	1–3	2–1	4–0	0–0	0–2
Mjøndalen	4–5	2–1	1–4	1–1	2–2	—	1–3	2–0	3–1	1–2	0–0	1–0	1–1	1–1	1–0	1–1
Molde	4–2	1–1	3–1	2–0	2–1	1–0	—	2–2	2–0	3–0	2–1	3–0	4–0	3–0	4–1	5–1
Odd	3–1	3–2	3–1	2–0	2–1	3–2	2–2	—	1–0	1–1	3–0	2–1	2–1	2–1	1–1	1–0
Ranheim	1–1	0–3	0–2	1–2	2–1	1–1	2–3	4–1	—	2–3	0–2	0–2	1–0	1–2	1–5	5–2
Rosenborg	3–2	0–0	0–2	1–0	3–1	3–2	3–1	1–1	3–2	—	1–0	3–2	0–0	5–2	3–0	5–1
Sarpsborg 08	1–1	1–1	1–1	0–1	1–0	1–1	1–1	2–0	1–3	1–1	—	0–0	2–2	3–2	1–0	2–2
Stabæk	2–0	0–1	1–1	2–0	1–1	4–2	1–2	0–0	0–0	3–1	3–3	—	2–1	0–1	1–1	0–0
Strømsgodset	1–3	6–0	3–2	2–3	1–1	2–3	0–4	2–3	1–0	3–3	2–1	0–2	—	3–1	3–2	0–0
Tromsø	1–2	1–2	2–2	5–0	1–1	2–2	2–1	1–2	4–2	1–0	2–0	1–1	0–1	—	0–0	0–2
Vålerenga	6–0	1–0	1–2	1–1	0–3	2–0	2–4	1–0	1–1	1–1	1–1	0–2	2–0	4–1	—	0–4
Viking	3–4	2–1	0–0	2–0	3–0	4–1	0–2	2–0	2–2	2–2	2–1	3–0	4–0	2–1	1–1	—

Source: Football Association of Norway (in Norwegian)
Legend: Blue = home team win; Yellow = draw; Red = away team win.

== Season statistics ==
=== Top scorers ===
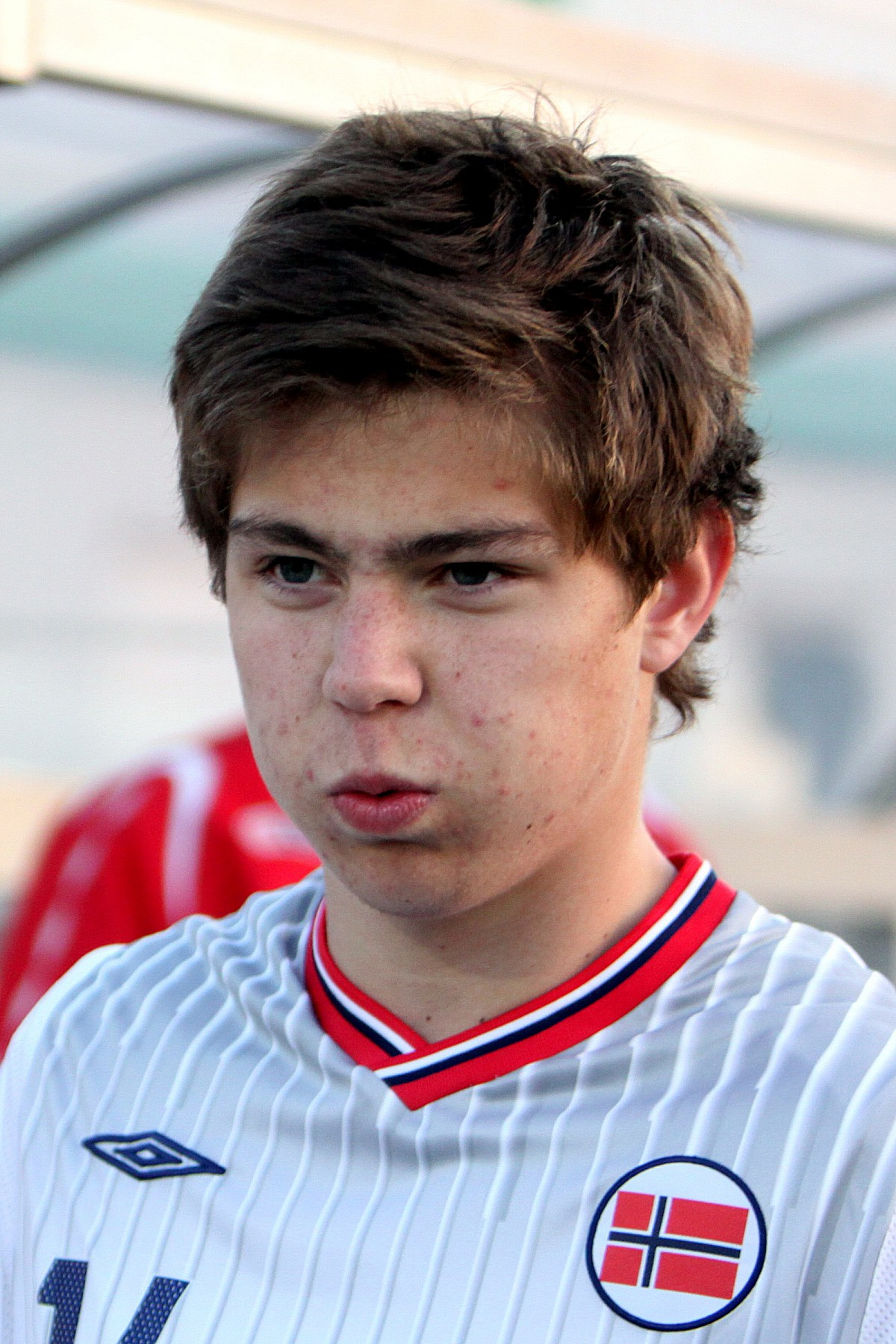
Odd's Torgeir Børven became the Eliteserien top scorer after scoring 21 goals.

Rank	Player	Club	Goals	Games	Average
1	(Norway) Torgeir Børven	Odd	21	30	0,70
2	(Nigeria) Leke James	Molde	17	28	0,61
3	(Norway) Ohi Omoijuanfo	Molde	15	27	0,56
4	(Norway) Håkon Evjen	Bodø/Glimt	13	29	0,45
5	(Norway) Magnus Wolff Eikrem	Molde	11	25	0,44
6	(Tunisia) Amor Layouni	Bodø/Glimt	10	21	0,48
6	(Norway) Amahl Pellegrino	Strømsgodset/Kristiansund	10	24	0,42
6	(Norway) Kristian Thorstvedt	Viking	10	26	0,38
9	(Norway) Tommy Høiland	Viking	9	22	0,41
9	(Norway) Lars-Jørgen Salvesen	Sarpsborg 08/Strømsgodset	9	26	0,35

=== Hat-tricks ===
Player	For	Against	Result	Date
(Sweden) Amor Layouni	Bodø/Glimt	Lillestrøm	4–0 (H)	5 May 2019
(Norway) Ohi Omoijuanfo	Molde	Viking	5–1 (H)	20 May 2019
(Senegal) Ibrahima Wadji	Haugesund	Mjøndalen	4–1 (A)	26 May 2019
(Nigeria) Leke James	Molde	Strømsgodset	4–0 (A)	22 June 2019
(Norway) Erik Botheim	Rosenborg	Tromsø	5–2 (H)	10 August 2019
(Norway) Amahl Pellegrino	Kristiansund	Viking	4–2 (H)	27 October 2019
(Denmark) Kasper Junker	Stabæk	Mjøndalen	4–2 (H)	24 November 2019

=== Clean sheets ===
Rank	Player	Club	Clean sheets
1	(Norway) Iven Austbø	Viking	11
2	(Sweden) Marcus Sandberg	Stabæk	10
3	(Norway) Håkon Opdal	Brann	8
3	(Norway) Helge Sandvik	Haugesund	8
5	(Brazil) Ricardo Friedrich	Bodø/Glimt	7
5	(Sweden) Andreas Linde	Molde	7
5	(Croatia) Marco Marić	Lillestrøm	7
5	(Republic of Ireland) Sean McDermott	Kristiansund	7
8	(Norway) André Hansen	Rosenborg	6
8	(Ghana) Adam Larsen Kwarasey	Vålerenga	6
8	(Norway) Julian Faye Lund	Mjøndalen	6
8	(Norway) Sondre Rossbach	Odd	6

=== Discipline ===
==== Player ====
- Most yellow cards: 8
  - (Norway) Zlatko Tripić (Viking)
- Most red cards: 1
  - (Ghana) Mohammed Abu (Vålerenga)
  - (Norway) Amin Askar (Sarpsborg 08)
  - (Norway) Fitim Azemi (Vålerenga)
  - (Norway) Fredrik André Bjørkan (Bodø/Glimt)
  - (Norway) Tobias Borchgrevink Børkeeiet (Stabæk)
  - (Norway) Vadim Demidov (Stabæk)
  - (Norway) Aron Dønnum (Vålerenga)
  - (Norway) Mikael Ingebrigtsen (Tromsø)
  - (Norway) Jesper Isaksen (Kristiansund)
  - (Denmark) Mike Jensen (Rosenborg)
  - (Mexico) Efraín Juárez (Vålerenga)
  - (Norway) Torbjørn Kallevåg (Haugesund)
  - (Northern Ireland) Kyle Lafferty (Sarpsborg 08)
  - (Norway) Ohi Omoijuanfo (Molde)
  - (Norway) Marcus Holmgren Pedersen (Tromsø)
  - (Nigeria) Usman Sale (Viking)
  - (The Gambia) Sheriff Sinyan (Lillestrøm)
  - (Norway) Alexander Søderlund (Rosenborg)
  - (Norway) Joackim Olsen Solberg (Mjøndalen)
  - (Norway) Ole Amund Sveen (Bodø/Glimt)

==== Club ====
- Most yellow cards: 55
  - Molde
- Most red cards: 4
  - Vålerenga

== League attendances ==
Pos	Team	Total	High	Low	Average	Change
1	Rosenborg	190,554	17,799	10,040	12,704	−22.6%
2	Brann	165,634	16,484	8,693	11,042	+5.9%
3	Viking	134,002	15,029	6,500	8,933	+13.1%^{1}
4	Vålerenga	117,516	14,418	5,037	7,834	−14.7%
5	Molde	96,828	9,010	5,952	6,916	−2.7%
6	Lillestrøm	86,868	9,884	4,337	5,791	+4.2%
7	Odd	83,978	7,295	4,492	5,599	+4.0%
8	Sarpsborg 08	82,892	7,042	4,767	5,526	+10.4%
9	Strømsgodset	79,458	8,505	4,576	5,297	−10.8%
10	Haugesund	62,878	7,001	3,305	4,186	−3.0%
11	Kristiansund	61,376	4,444	3,820	4,092	+1.2%
12	Stabæk	54,793	4,621	3,082	3,653	−0.1%
13	Bodø/Glimt	50,099	4,248	2,777	3,340	+3.8%
14	Tromsø	49,683	5,522	2,514	3,312	−9.4%
15	Mjøndalen	35,145	3,350	1,963	2,343	+27.2%^{1}
16	Ranheim	28,248	2,925	1,353	1,883	−6.7%
	League total	1,379,861	17,799	1,353	5,773	−1.6%

Updated to games played on 1 December 2019
Source: nifs.no
Notes:
1: Team played last season in 1. divisjon.

== Awards ==
Award	Winner	Club
Player of the Year	(Norway) Håkon Evjen	Bodø/Glimt
Young Player of the Year	(Norway) Håkon Evjen	Bodø/Glimt
Manager of the Year	(Norway) Kjetil Knutsen	Bodø/Glimt
Goal of the Year ^{Video}	(Norway) Ola Brynhildsen	Stabæk

Team of the Year (Verdens Gang)
Goalkeeper	(Sweden) Marcus Sandberg (Stabæk)				
Defenders	(Norway) Ruben Gabrielsen (Molde)		(Norway) Tore Reginiussen (Rosenborg)		(Norway) Kristoffer Haugen (Molde)
Midfielders	(Norway) Aron Dønnum (Vålerenga)	(Norway) Kristian Thorstvedt (Viking)	(Norway) Magnus Wolff Eikrem (Molde)	(Norway) Håkon Evjen (Bodø/Glimt)	(Kosovo) Herolind Shala (Vålerenga)
Forwards	(Norway) Zlatko Tripic (Viking)			(Tunisia) Amor Layouni (Bodø/Glimt)	
Team of the Year (Eurosport)
Goalkeeper	(Sweden) Marcus Sandberg (Stabæk)				
Defenders	(Norway) Kristoffer Haraldseid (Molde)		(Norway) Ruben Gabrielsen (Molde)	(Norway) Tore Reginiussen (Rosenborg)	(Norway) Fredrik André Bjørkan (Bodø/Glimt)
Midfielders	(Norway) Magnus Wolff Eikrem (Molde)		(Norway) Sondre Tronstad (Haugesund)		(Norway) Håkon Evjen (Bodø/Glimt)
Forwards	(Norway) Zlatko Tripic (Viking)		(Norway) Torgeir Børven (Odd)		(Tunisia) Amor Layouni (Bodø/Glimt)
Team of the Year (Nettavisen)
Goalkeeper	(Sweden) Marcus Sandberg (Stabæk)				
Defenders	(Norway) Ruben Gabrielsen (Molde)		(Norway) Tore Reginiussen (Rosenborg)	(Norway) Fredrik André Bjørkan (Bodø/Glimt)	(Norway) Martin Bjørnbak (Molde)
Midfielders	(Norway) Magnus Wolff Eikrem (Molde)		(Norway) Håkon Evjen (Bodø/Glimt)	(Norway) Fredrik Aursnes (Molde)	(Norway) Zlatko Tripic (Viking)
Forwards	(Nigeria) Leke James (Molde)			(Norway) Torgeir Børven (Odd)	
