= 2022 Eliteserien =

78th season of top-tier football league in Norway

Eliteserien
- Season: 2022
- Dates: 2 April – 13 November
- Champions: Molde; 5th title
- Relegated: Kristiansund; Jerv
- Champions League: Molde
- Europa Conference League: Bodø/Glimt; Rosenborg
- Matches played: 240
- Goals scored: 781 (3.25 per match)
- Top goalscorer: Amahl Pellegrino (25 goals)
- Biggest home win: Bodø/Glimt 7–0 Odd (6 August 2022)
- Biggest away win: Vålerenga 0–6 Bodø/Glimt (16 October 2022)
- Highest scoring: Bodø/Glimt 5–4 Viking (6 November 2022)
- Longest winning run: 17 matches Molde
- Longest unbeaten run: 25 matches Molde
- Longest winless run: 15 matches Sandefjord
- Longest losing run: 8 matches Kristiansund; Sarpsborg 08
- Highest attendance: 21,275; Rosenborg 3–2 Bodø/Glimt (30 October 2022)
- Lowest attendance: 2,005; Tromsø 2–5 Sarpsborg 08 (24 April 2022)
- Average attendance: 5,713

The 2022 Eliteserien was the 78th season of top-tier football in Norway. This was the sixth season of Eliteserien after rebranding from Tippeligaen. Molde were crowned the champions at the end of the season, winning their 5th Norwegian league title.

The season started on 2 April 2022 and ended on 13 November 2022, not including play-off matches.

Bodø/Glimt were the defending champions, having won the previous season. HamKam, Aalesund and Jerv joined as the promoted clubs from the 2021 Norwegian First Division. They replaced Brann, Stabæk and Mjøndalen who were relegated to the First Division.

== Teams ==
Sixteen teams competed in the league in this season – the top thirteen teams from the previous season, and three teams promoted from the First Division. The promoted teams were HamKam (returning to the top flight after a thirteen season absence), Aalesund (returning to the top flight after a one season absence) and Jerv (first season in the top flight). They replaced Brann, Stabæk and Mjøndalen, ending their top flight spells of six, eight and three years respectively.

=== Stadiums and locations ===
Locations of the teams in 2022 Eliteserien

Note: Table lists in alphabetical order.

Team	Ap.	Location	County	Arena	Turf	Capacity
Aalesund	18	Ålesund	Møre og Romsdal	Color Line Stadion	Artificial	10,778
Bodø/Glimt	27	Bodø	Nordland	Aspmyra Stadion	Artificial	8,300
HamKam	23	Hamar	Innlandet	Briskeby	Artificial	7,800
Haugesund	16	Haugesund	Rogaland	Haugesund Sparebank Arena	Natural	8,754
Jerv	1	Grimstad	Agder	Levermyr Stadion	Natural	3,300
Kristiansund	6	Kristiansund	Møre og Romsdal	Kristiansund Stadion	Artificial	4,444
Lillestrøm	58	Lillestrøm	Viken	Åråsen Stadion	Natural	11,500
Molde	46	Molde	Møre og Romsdal	Aker Stadion	Artificial	11,249
Odd	41	Skien	Vestfold og Telemark	Skagerak Arena	Artificial	11,767
Rosenborg	59	Trondheim	Trøndelag	Lerkendal Stadion	Natural	21,421
Sandefjord	10	Sandefjord	Vestfold og Telemark	Release Arena	Natural	6,582
Sarpsborg 08	11	Sarpsborg	Viken	Sarpsborg Stadion	Artificial	8,022
Strømsgodset	35	Drammen	Viken	Marienlyst Stadion	Artificial	8,935
Tromsø	34	Tromsø	Troms og Finnmark	Alfheim Stadion	Artificial	6,687
Viking	72	Stavanger	Rogaland	SR-Bank Arena	Artificial	15,900
Vålerenga	62	Oslo	Oslo	Intility Arena	Artificial	16,555

=== Personnel and kits ===
Team	President	Manager(s)	Captain	Kit manufacturer	Shirt sponsor
Aalesund	(Norway) Jan Petter Hagen	(Norway) Lars Arne Nilsen	(Sweden) David Fällman	Umbro	Sparebanken Møre
Bodø/Glimt	(Norway) Inge Henning Andersen	(Norway) Kjetil Knutsen	(Norway) Ulrik Saltnes	Diadora	Sparebanken Nord-Norge
HamKam	(Norway) Truls Nordby Johansen	(Denmark) Jakob Michelsen	(Norway) Aleksander Melgalvis	Puma	Eidsiva Energi
Haugesund	(Norway) Leif Helge Kaldheim	(Norway) Jostein Grindhaug	(Norway) Kevin Martin Krygård	Macron	Haugaland Kraft
Jerv	(Norway) Per Gunnar Topland	(Norway) Arne Sandstø	(Denmark) Mathias Wichmann	Umbro	J. J. Ugland
Kristiansund	(Norway) Vidar Solli	(Norway) Christian Michelsen	(Norway) Dan Peter Ulvestad	Macron	SpareBank 1 Nordvest
Lillestrøm	(Norway) Morten Kokkim	(Norway) Geir Bakke	(Norway) Gjermund Åsen	Puma	DNB
Molde	(Norway) Odd Ivar Moen	(Norway) Erling Moe	(Norway) Magnus Wolff Eikrem	Adidas	Sparebanken Møre
Odd	(Norway) Trond Haukvik	(Norway) Pål Arne Johansen	(Norway) Steffen Hagen	Hummel	SpareBank 1 Telemark
Rosenborg	(Norway) Cecilie Gotaas Johnsen	(Norway) Kjetil Rekdal	(Norway) Markus Henriksen	Adidas	SpareBank 1 SMN
Sandefjord	(Norway) Gunnar Bjønness	(Norway) Hans Erik Ødegaard (Sweden) Andreas Tegström	(Norway) Harmeet Singh	Macron	Jotun
Sarpsborg 08	(Norway) Hans Petter Arnesen	(Sweden) Stefan Billborn	(Norway) Joachim Thomassen	Select	Borregaard
Strømsgodset	(Norway) Ivar Strømsjordet	(Norway) Bjørn Petter Ingebretsen (Norway) Håkon Wibe-Lund	(Norway) Gustav Valsvik	Puma	DNB
Tromsø	(Norway) Helge Kræmer	(Norway) Gaute Helstrup	(Norway) Ruben Yttergård Jenssen	Select	Sparebanken Nord-Norge
Vålerenga	(Norway) Thomas Baardseng	(Norway) Dag-Eilev Fagermo	(Norway) Jonatan Tollås	Adidas	DNB
Viking	(Norway) Stig H. Christiansen	(Norway) Bjarte Lunde Aarsheim (Norway) Morten Jensen	(Norway) Veton Berisha	Diadora	Lyse

=== Managerial changes ===
Team	Outgoing manager	Manner of departure	Date of vacancy	Table	Incoming manager	Date of appointment	Table
Rosenborg	(Norway) Åge Hareide	Contract expired	31 December 2021	Pre-season	(Norway) Kjetil Rekdal	1 January 2022	Pre-season
Sarpsborg 08	(Norway) Lars Bohinen	Contract expired	31 December 2021	Pre-season	(Sweden) Stefan Billborn	7 January 2022	Pre-season
HamKam	(Norway) Kjetil Rekdal	Signed by Rosenborg	31 December 2021	Pre-season	(Denmark) Jakob Michelsen	9 January 2022	Pre-season
Odd	(Norway) Jan Frode Nornes	Sacked	8 January 2022	Pre-season	(Norway) Pål Arne Johansen	24 January 2022	Pre-season

== League table ==
Pos	Team	Pld	W	D	L	GF	GA	GD	Pts	Qualification or relegation
1	Molde (C)	30	25	3	2	71	25	+46	78	Qualification for the Champions League second qualifying round
2	Bodø/Glimt	30	18	6	6	86	41	+45	60	Qualification for the Europa Conference League second qualifying round
3	Rosenborg	30	16	8	6	69	44	+25	56	Qualification for the Europa Conference League second qualifying round
4	Lillestrøm	30	16	5	9	49	34	+15	53	
5	Odd	30	13	6	11	43	45	−2	45	
6	Vålerenga	30	13	5	12	52	49	+3	44	
7	Tromsø	30	10	13	7	46	49	−3	43	
8	Sarpsborg 08	30	12	5	13	57	54	+3	41	
9	Aalesund	30	10	9	11	32	45	−13	39	
10	Haugesund	30	10	8	12	42	46	−4	38	
11	Viking	30	9	8	13	48	54	−6	35	
12	Strømsgodset	30	9	6	15	44	55	−11	33	
13	HamKam	30	6	13	11	33	43	−10	31	
14	Sandefjord (O)	30	6	6	18	42	68	−26	24	Qualification for the relegation play-offs
15	Kristiansund (R)	30	5	8	17	37	60	−23	23	Relegation to First Division
16	Jerv (R)	30	5	5	20	30	69	−39	20	Relegation to First Division

Source: Football Association of Norway (in Norwegian)
Rules for classification: 1) Points; 2) Goal difference; 3) Goals scored; 4) Head-to-head points; 5) Head-to-head goal difference; 6) Head-to-head goals scored.
(C) Champions; (O) Play-off winners; (R) Relegated

== Positions by round ==
Team ╲ Round	1	2	3	4	5	6	7	8	9	10	11	12	13	14	15	16	17	18	19	20	21	22	23	24	25	26	27	28	29	30
Molde	3	1	3	5	7	3	3	3	2	2	2	2	2	2	2	1	1	1	1	1	1	1	1	1	1	1	1	1	1	1
Bodø/Glimt	7	4	1	3	5	6	4	5	8	5	3	4	3	3	3	3	3	2	3	2	2	3	4	2	2	2	2	2	2	2
Rosenborg	7	5	7	9	12	7	8	7	6	9	5	7	4	5	4	4	4	4	4	4	4	4	3	3	3	3	3	3	3	3
Lillestrøm	7	3	2	1	2	2	1	1	1	1	1	1	1	1	1	2	2	3	2	3	3	2	2	4	4	4	4	4	4	4
Odd	2	7	4	8	11	15	10	12	10	11	11	9	9	10	9	9	11	12	9	9	9	8	7	6	6	8	7	6	6	5
Vålerenga	11	9	14	10	4	5	9	9	11	12	14	14	13	13	10	6	6	6	5	5	5	5	5	5	5	5	5	5	5	6
Tromsø	16	11	11	13	14	14	12	13	13	13	13	12	12	12	13	11	9	8	8	8	8	7	9	9	7	6	6	7	7	7
Sarpsborg 08	11	8	9	3	3	3	7	8	7	4	7	3	8	9	11	12	12	14	14	14	13	11	11	11	9	7	8	8	8	8
Aalesund	3	10	10	6	6	9	6	4	5	6	9	5	6	6	7	7	10	11	11	12	11	12	12	12	11	12	9	10	9	9
Haugesund	15	15	16	16	15	12	14	14	14	14	12	13	14	14	14	14	13	9	10	11	10	10	10	10	12	10	12	9	10	10
Viking	3	2	5	2	1	1	2	2	3	3	6	8	5	4	5	5	5	5	6	6	6	6	6	7	8	9	10	11	11	11
Strømsgodset	11	16	13	14	13	8	5	6	4	7	4	6	7	8	6	8	7	7	7	7	7	9	8	8	10	11	11	12	12	12
HamKam	7	13	8	12	9	10	11	10	12	10	10	10	10	11	12	13	14	13	13	10	12	13	13	13	13	13	13	13	13	13
Sandefjord	1	6	12	7	10	13	15	11	9	8	8	11	11	7	8	10	8	10	12	13	14	14	14	14	14	14	14	14	14	14
Kristiansund	11	14	15	15	16	16	16	16	16	16	16	16	16	16	16	16	16	16	16	16	16	15	15	15	15	15	15	15	15	15
Jerv	3	12	6	11	8	11	13	15	15	15	15	15	15	15	15	15	15	15	15	15	15	16	16	16	16	16	16	16	16	16

Leader / 2023–24 UEFA Champions League first qualifying round
2023–24 UEFA Europa Conference League second qualifying round
Relegation play-offs
Relegation to 2023 1. divisjon

Source: nifs.no

== Results ==
Home \ Away	AAL	BOD	HAM	HAU	JER	KRI	LIL	MOL	ODD	ROS	SAN	SRP	STR	TRO	VIK	VÅL
Aalesund	—	1–2	0–0	1–2	2–1	1–0	2–1	0–2	1–1	0–0	1–0	1–3	1–0	2–2	2–1	2–2
Bodø/Glimt	2–0	—	2–2	1–1	5–0	5–0	1–1	1–4	7–0	2–2	4–1	4–1	2–2	1–1	5–4	5–1
HamKam	0–0	0–2	—	1–0	2–1	0–1	2–2	0–0	1–2	1–1	3–0	3–2	1–1	1–2	1–2	1–1
Haugesund	2–2	1–4	1–1	—	3–1	2–0	0–1	0–1	2–2	2–1	1–3	3–1	0–1	2–1	4–2	1–1
Jerv	0–1	0–2	1–2	1–0	—	1–0	1–0	2–4	0–1	2–4	1–2	0–5	1–0	1–1	2–2	2–5
Kristiansund	4–0	0–2	2–2	0–1	1–1	—	1–3	2–3	2–2	4–4	3–1	2–3	0–3	1–1	2–1	3–2
Lillestrøm	2–0	1–4	3–1	1–0	4–0	1–1	—	0–1	0–2	3–1	3–0	1–0	2–1	1–1	0–1	2–0
Molde	3–0	3–1	5–0	1–0	1–1	2–1	1–2	—	3–0	2–1	2–1	4–1	3–0	5–1	3–4	1–0
Odd	2–3	3–2	2–0	0–4	2–1	1–1	1–2	1–2	—	2–3	0–1	1–0	5–1	2–0	2–1	2–1
Rosenborg	2–1	3–2	2–1	3–3	3–2	3–1	3–1	0–0	1–0	—	3–0	2–3	3–0	3–0	4–1	3–0
Sandefjord	2–2	1–2	1–2	2–2	1–2	2–0	1–4	2–3	1–3	2–5	—	1–1	2–2	2–2	2–2	1–3
Sarpsborg 08	1–2	1–4	2–1	4–0	4–3	2–2	0–2	1–2	1–0	1–1	4–3	—	5–1	1–1	0–1	0–1
Strømsgodset	1–2	2–4	1–1	1–2	6–0	4–1	3–0	1–3	0–0	3–0	0–5	3–1	—	1–2	3–2	3–2
Tromsø	2–2	3–2	2–1	1–1	2–2	2–1	2–2	0–1	3–2	4–3	3–0	2–5	1–0	—	1–1	1–0
Viking	1–0	2–0	1–1	5–1	3–0	2–1	0–3	1–4	1–1	1–1	1–2	0–1	0–0	2–2	—	1–2
Vålerenga	4–0	0–6	1–1	2–1	1–0	3–0	3–1	1–2	0–1	0–4	4–0	3–3	4–0	1–0	4–2	—

Source: Football Association of Norway (in Norwegian)
Legend: Blue = home team win; Yellow = draw; Red = away team win.

== Relegation play-offs ==
Sandefjord, the 14th-placed team in Eliteserien defeated Kongsvinger, the winners of the First Division promotion play-offs 5-2 (aggregate) over two legs to qualify to remain in the Eliteserien in the following season.

16 November 2022
18:00 CET

Sandefjord	4–0	Kongsvinger
Ofkir 3'; Winbo 42'; Tveter 54'; Kurtovic 78'	Report

Sandefjord Arena, Sandefjord
Attendance: 5,020
Referee: Kai Erik Steen
19 November 2022
16:00 CET

Kongsvinger	2–1	Sandefjord
Langrekken 49'; Holter 79'	Report	Nyenetue 31'

Gjemselund Stadion, Kongsvinger
Attendance: 1,882
Referee: Tore Hansen

== Season statistics ==
=== Top scorers ===
Rank	Player	Club	Goals
1	(Norway) Amahl Pellegrino	Bodø/Glimt	25
2	(Norway) Hugo Vetlesen	Bodø/Glimt	16
3	(Ivory Coast) David Datro Fofana	Molde	15
3	(Norway) Tobias Heintz	Sarpsborg 08	15
3	(Denmark) Casper Tengstedt	Rosenborg	15
6	(Norway) Ole Sæter	Rosenborg	14
7	(Norway) Eric Kitolano	Tromsø	13
8	(Norway) Runar Espejord	Bodø/Glimt	12
8	(Norway) Mohamed Ofkir	Sandefjord	12
10	(Norway) Ola Brynhildsen	Molde	11
10	(Norway) Johan Hove	Strømsgodset	11

=== Hat-tricks ===
Player	For	Against	Result	Date
(Norway) Alexander Ruud Tveter	Sandefjord	Haugesund	3–1 (A)	3 April 2022
(Norway) Mohamed Ofkir	Sandefjord	Strømsgodset	5–0 (A)	23 April 2022
(Norway) Veton Berisha	Viking	Haugesund	5–1 (H)	30 April 2022
(Norway) Ole Sæter	Rosenborg	Kristiansund	3–1 (H)	25 June 2022
(United States) Sam Rogers	Rosenborg	Jerv	3–2 (H)	10 July 2022
(Norway) Amahl Pellegrino	Bodø/Glimt	Jerv	5–0 (H)	24 July 2022
(Norway) Hugo Vegard Vetlesen	Bodø/Glimt	Odd	7–0 (H)	6 August 2022
(Denmark) Casper Tengstedt	Rosenborg	Sandefjord	5–2 (A)	12 August 2022
(Norway) Tobias Heintz	Sarpsborg 08	Jerv	4–3 (H)	18 September 2022

Notes

^{4} Player scored 4 goals
(H) – Home team
(A) – Away team

=== Clean sheets ===
Rank	Player	Club	Clean sheets
1	(Norway) Jacob Karlstrøm	Molde	12
2	(Norway) Mads Hedenstad Christiansen	Lillestrøm	9
3	(Norway) André Hansen	Rosenborg	8
4	(Norway) Sten Grytebust	Aalesund	7
4	(Russia) Nikita Khaykin	Bodø/Glimt	7
4	(Norway) Viljar Myhra	Strømsgodset	7
4	(Sweden) Leopold Wahlstedt	Odd	7
8	(Iceland) Patrik Gunnarsson	Viking	6
8	(Norway) Magnus Sjøeng	Vålerenga	6
10	(Guatemala) Nicholas Hagen	HamKam	4
10	(Norway) Øystein Øvretveit	Jerv	4

=== Discipline ===
==== Player ====
- Most yellow cards: 9
  - (Croatia) Dario Canadija (Aalesund)
- Most red cards: 2
  - (Norway) Odin Bjørtuft (Odd)
  - (Denmark) Anton Skipper (Sarpsborg 08)

==== Club ====
- Most yellow cards: 59
  - Viking
- Most red cards: 5
  - Sarpsborg 08

== Awards ==
=== Monthly awards ===
Month	Coach of the Month		Player of the Month		Young Player of the Month		References
Month	Coach	Club	Player	Club	Player	Club	References
April	(Norway) Geir Bakke	Lillestrøm	(Nigeria) Igoh Ogbu	Lillestrøm	Not awarded		
May	(Norway) Bjørn Petter Ingebretsen (Norway) Håkon Wibe-Lund	Strømsgodset	(Norway) Veton Berisha	Viking	Not awarded		
July	(Norway) Dag-Eilev Fagermo	Vålerenga	(Norway) Amahl Pellegrino	Bodø/Glimt	(Ivory Coast) David Datro Fofana	Molde	
August	(Norway) Erling Moe	Molde	(Denmark) Casper Tengstedt	Rosenborg	(Norway) Osame Sahraoui	Vålerenga	
September	(Norway) Erling Moe	Molde	(Norway) Markus Kaasa	Molde	(Norway) Christos Zafeiris	Haugesund	
October	(Norway) Erling Moe	Molde	(Denmark) Casper Tengstedt	Rosenborg	(Norway) Dennis Gjengaar	Odd	

=== Annual awards ===
Award	Winner	Club
Player of the Year	(Norway) Hugo Vetlesen	Bodø/Glimt
Young Player of the Year	(Norway) Sivert Mannsverk	Molde
Manager of the Year	(Norway) Erling Moe	Molde

== League attendances ==
Pos	Team	Total	High	Low	Average	Change
1	Rosenborg	196,377	21,275	9,764	13,092	+99.1%
2	Viking	148,648	15,500	7,136	9,910	+64.0%
3	Vålerenga	130,044	16,555	5,520	8,670	+100.8%
4	Lillestrøm	101,148	10,527	4,567	6,743	+88.4%
5	Molde	95,823	10,755	5,045	6,388	+108.1%
6	Bodø/Glimt	88,953	7,837	4,809	5,930	+153.9%
7	Aalesund	82,184	10,778	4,194	5,479	+99.6%^{1}
8	Strømsgodset	73,065	5,887	3,897	4,871	+70.6%
9	Sarpsborg 08	71,707	5,831	4,094	4,780	+72.1%
10	Odd	68,035	7,164	3,380	4,536	+50.9%
11	HamKam	67,428	6,904	3,037	4,495	+108.7%^{1}
12	Haugesund	58,533	5,608	3,187	3,902	+49.3%
13	Kristiansund	56,909	4,444	3,410	3,794	+70.3%
14	Sandefjord	49,995	6,182	2,497	3,333	+87.8%
15	Tromsø	45,071	6,691	2,005	3,005	+70.0%^{1}
16	Jerv	37,315	3,002	2,090	2,488	+176.4%^{1}
	League total	1,371,235	21,275	2,005	5,713	+76.3%

Updated to games played on 13 November 2022
Source: nifs.no
Notes:
1: Team played last season in 1. divisjon.
