= 2021 Eliteserien =

77th season of top-tier football league in Norway

Eliteserien
- Season: 2021
- Dates: 9 May – 12 December
- Champions: Bodø/Glimt; 2nd title
- Relegated: Brann; Stabæk; Mjøndalen
- Champions League: Bodø/Glimt
- Europa Conference League: Molde; Viking; Lillestrøm
- Matches played: 240
- Goals scored: 732 (3.05 per match)
- Top goalscorer: Ohi Omoijuanfo (27 goals)
- Biggest home win: Haugesund 7–0 Mjøndalen (17 October 2021)
- Biggest away win: 0–3 (8 matches)
- Highest scoring: Bodø/Glimt 7–2 Strømsgodset (16 June 2021); Molde 5–4 Haugesund (8 August 2021)
- Longest winning run: 5 matches Kristiansund; Molde
- Longest unbeaten run: 18 matches Bodø/Glimt
- Longest winless run: 13 matches Mjøndalen
- Longest losing run: 6 matches Brann
- Highest attendance: 17,439; Rosenborg 4–1 Sandefjord (24 October 2021)

The 2021 Eliteserien was the 77th completed season of top-tier football in Norway. This was fifth season of Eliteserien as rebranding from Tippeligaen.

The season was originally scheduled to begin on 5 April and end on 27 November 2021, not including play-off matches. Restrictions enforced by the government due to the COVID-19 pandemic forced the Norwegian Football Federation to postpone the start several times and the league started on 9 May 2021. The last round was played on 12 December 2021.

Bodø/Glimt were the defending champions. Tromsø and Lillestrøm joined as the promoted clubs from the 2020 Norwegian First Division. They replaced Aalesund and IK Start who were relegated to the 2021 Norwegian First Division.

== Teams ==
Sixteen teams competed in the league – the top fourteen teams from the previous season, and two teams promoted from Norwegian First Division. The promoted teams were Tromsø and Lillestrøm, both returning to the top flight after an absence of just one year. They replaced Aalesund and IK Start, both relegated after a season's presence.

=== Stadiums and locations ===
Locations of the teams in 2021 Eliteserien

Note: Table lists in alphabetical order.

Team	Ap.	Location	County	Arena	Turf	Capacity
Bodø/Glimt	26	Bodø	Nordland	Aspmyra Stadion	Artificial	5,635
Brann	64	Bergen	Vestland	Brann Stadion	Natural	17,049
Haugesund	15	Haugesund	Rogaland	Haugesund Stadion	Natural	8,754
Kristiansund	5	Kristiansund	Møre og Romsdal	Kristiansund Stadion	Artificial	4,444
Lillestrøm	57	Lillestrøm	Viken	Åråsen Stadion	Natural	11,500
Mjøndalen	22	Mjøndalen	Viken	Consto Arena	Artificial	4,200
Molde	45	Molde	Møre og Romsdal	Aker Stadion	Artificial	11,249
Odd	40	Skien	Vestfold og Telemark	Skagerak Arena	Artificial	11,767
Rosenborg	58	Trondheim	Trøndelag	Lerkendal Stadion	Natural	21,421
Sandefjord	9	Sandefjord	Vestfold og Telemark	Release Arena	Natural	6,582
Sarpsborg 08	10	Sarpsborg	Viken	Sarpsborg Stadion	Artificial	8,022
Stabæk	25	Bærum	Viken	Nadderud Stadion	Natural	4,938
Strømsgodset	34	Drammen	Viken	Marienlyst Stadion	Artificial	8,935
Tromsø	33	Tromsø	Troms og Finnmark	Alfheim Stadion	Artificial	6,687
Viking	71	Stavanger	Rogaland	Viking Stadion	Artificial	15,900
Vålerenga	61	Oslo	Oslo	Intility Arena	Artificial	16,555

=== Personnel and kits ===
Team	Manager(s)	Captain	Kit manufacturer	Shirt sponsor
Bodø/Glimt	(Norway) Kjetil Knutsen	(Norway) Ulrik Saltnes (Norway) Patrick Berg	Diadora	Sparebanken Nord-Norge
Brann	(Norway) Eirik Horneland	(Norway) Kristoffer Barmen	Nike	Sparebanken Vest
Haugesund	(Norway) Jostein Grindhaug	(Denmark) Benjamin Hansen	Macron	Haugaland Kraft
Kristiansund	(Norway) Christian Michelsen	(Norway) Dan Peter Ulvestad	Macron	SpareBank 1 Nordvest
Lillestrøm	(Norway) Geir Bakke	(Norway) Thomas Lehne Olsen	Puma	DNB
Mjøndalen	(Norway) Vegard Hansen	(Norway) Christian Gauseth	Umbro	Sparebanken Øst
Molde	(Norway) Erling Moe	(Norway) Magnus Wolff Eikrem	Nike	Sparebanken Møre
Odd	(Norway) Jan Frode Nornes	(Norway) Steffen Hagen	Hummel	SpareBank 1 Telemark
Rosenborg	(Norway) Åge Hareide	(Norway) Markus Henriksen (Norway) André Hansen	Adidas	SpareBank 1 SMN
Sandefjord	(Norway) Hans Erik Ødegaard (Sweden) Andreas Tegström	(Norway) Harmeet Singh	Macron	Jotun
Sarpsborg 08	(Norway) Lars Bohinen	(Norway) Joachim Thomassen	Select	Borregaard
Stabæk	(Norway) Eirik Kjønø	(Norway) Yaw Amankwah	Macron	SpareBank 1 Østlandet
Strømsgodset	(Norway) Bjørn Petter Ingebretsen (Norway) Håkon Wibe-Lund	(Norway) Gustav Valsvik	Puma	DNB
Tromsø	(Norway) Gaute Helstrup	(Norway) Ruben Yttergård Jenssen	Select	Sparebanken Nord-Norge
Vålerenga	(Norway) Dag-Eilev Fagermo	(Norway) Jonatan Tollås	Umbro	DNB
Viking	(Norway) Bjarte Lunde Aarsheim (Norway) Morten Jensen	(Norway) Veton Berisha	Diadora	Lyse

=== Managerial changes ===
Team	Outgoing manager	Manner of departure	Date of vacancy	Table	Incoming manager(s)	Date of appointment	Table
Viking	(Norway) Bjarne Berntsen	Mutual consent	31 December 2020	Pre-season	(Norway) Bjarte Lunde Aarsheim (Norway) Morten Jensen	1 January 2021	Pre-season
Sandefjord	(Spain) Martí Cifuentes	Contract expired	31 December 2020	Pre-season	(Norway) Hans Erik Ødegaard (Sweden) Andreas Tegström	1 January 2021	Pre-season
Strømsgodset	(Denmark) Henrik Pedersen	Mutual consent	9 April 2021	Pre-season	(Norway) Bjørn Petter Ingebretsen (Norway) Håkon Wibe-Lund	12 April 2021	Pre-season
Sarpsborg 08	(Sweden) Mikael Stahre	Signed by Göteborg	2 June 2021	8th	(Norway) Lars Bohinen	6 June 2021	8th
Stabæk	(Sweden) Jan Jönsson	Mutual consent	4 July 2021	15th	(Norway) Eirik Kjønø	9 July 2021	15th
Brann	(Norway) Kåre Ingebrigtsen	Sacked	19 July 2021	15th	(Norway) Eirik Horneland (Note: Horneland was initially appointed on an interim basis, but he was made permanent manager on 19 November 2021.)	20 July 2021	15th

== League table ==
Pos	Team	Pld	W	D	L	GF	GA	GD	Pts	Qualification or relegation
1	Bodø/Glimt (C)	30	18	9	3	59	25	+34	63	Qualification for the Champions League first qualifying round
2	Molde	30	18	6	6	70	40	+30	60	Qualification for the Europa Conference League second qualifying round (Note: Since the winners of the 2021 Norwegian Cup, Molde, have already qualified for European competitions based on league position, the last European spot was passed down to the fourth placed team, Lillestrøm.)
3	Viking	30	17	6	7	60	47	+13	57	Qualification for the Europa Conference League second qualifying round
4	Lillestrøm	30	14	7	9	49	40	+9	49	Qualification for the Europa Conference League second qualifying round
5	Rosenborg	30	13	9	8	58	42	+16	48	
6	Kristiansund	30	14	4	12	41	46	−5	46	
7	Vålerenga	30	11	12	7	46	37	+9	45	
8	Sarpsborg 08	30	11	6	13	39	44	−5	39	
9	Strømsgodset	30	9	9	12	43	43	0	36	
10	Sandefjord	30	10	6	14	38	52	−14	36	
11	Haugesund	30	9	8	13	46	45	+1	35	
12	Tromsø	30	8	11	11	33	44	−11	35	
13	Odd	30	8	9	13	44	58	−14	33	
14	Brann (R)	30	5	11	14	38	55	−17	26	Qualification for the relegation play-offs
15	Stabæk (R)	30	6	7	17	35	62	−27	25	Relegation to First Division
16	Mjøndalen (R)	30	4	10	16	33	52	−19	22	Relegation to First Division

Source: Football Association of Norway (in Norwegian)
Rules for classification: 1) Points; 2) Goal difference; 3) Goals scored; 4) Head-to-head points; 5) Head-to-head goal difference; 6) Head-to-head away goals scored (only if between two teams); 7) Head-to-head goals scored; 8) Play-off (only used to decide champions or relegation).
(C) Champions; (R) Relegated

== Positions by round ==
Team ╲ Round	1	2	3	4	5	6	7	8	9	10	11	12	13	14	15	16	17	18	19	20	21	22	23	24	25	26	27	28	29	30
Bodø/Glimt	1	1	2	2	1	1	1	2	3	4	6	3	4	2	2	2	1	2	1	1	1	1	1	1	1	1	1	1	1	1
Molde	4	5	1	1	2	4	3	1	1	1	1	1	1	1	1	1	2	1	2	2	2	2	2	2	2	2	2	2	2	2
Viking	3	10	13	7	4	8	4	7	7	7	7	8	10	8	6	6	6	6	6	6	5	5	4	3	3	3	3	3	3	3
Lillestrøm	5	2	4	6	3	7	5	3	2	2	2	2	2	3	4	4	3	5	5	5	6	6	6	6	5	6	6	4	5	4
Rosenborg	6	3	5	9	6	3	6	8	9	11	11	9	7	5	5	3	5	4	4	3	4	4	3	4	4	4	4	5	4	5
Kristiansund	14	15	12	8	5	2	2	4	4	5	3	5	3	4	3	5	4	3	3	4	3	3	5	5	6	5	5	6	7	6
Vålerenga	6	4	7	10	7	5	7	6	5	3	4	4	6	7	7	7	7	8	8	9	7	7	7	7	7	7	7	7	6	7
Sarpsborg 08	6	12	14	14	14	13	12	10	11	12	12	12	12	12	12	12	12	12	12	12	12	12	11	10	10	8	8	8	8	8
Strømsgodset	1	8	3	4	9	10	8	9	8	8	9	10	8	10	11	9	9	9	9	7	8	9	9	9	8	9	10	10	11	9
Sandefjord	6	6	10	3	10	11	13	11	12	10	8	7	9	9	10	11	11	10	10	11	11	11	12	11	13	13	13	11	9	10
Haugesund	6	7	6	5	11	6	9	5	6	6	5	6	5	6	8	8	8	7	7	8	9	8	8	8	9	10	9	9	10	11
Tromsø	15	13	10	13	13	15	11	13	15	14	14	14	14	13	13	13	13	13	13	13	13	13	13	12	11	11	11	12	12	12
Odd	15	14	15	15	15	14	15	14	10	9	10	11	11	11	9	10	10	11	11	10	10	10	10	13	12	12	12	13	13	13
Brann	13	16	16	16	16	16	16	16	16	16	16	16	16	16	16	16	16	15	15	14	14	14	14	14	15	14	16	16	15	14
Stabæk	12	9	9	12	8	9	10	12	14	13	13	15	15	15	15	15	15	16	16	15	15	15	15	16	14	15	14	14	14	15
Mjøndalen	6	11	7	10	12	12	14	15	13	15	15	13	13	14	14	14	14	14	14	16	16	16	16	15	16	16	15	15	16	16

Leader / 2022–23 UEFA Champions League first qualifying round
2022–23 UEFA Europa Conference League second qualifying round
Relegation play-offs
Relegation to 2022 1. divisjon

Source: nifs.no

== Results ==
Home \ Away	BOD	BRA	HAU	KRI	LIL	MIF	MOL	ODD	ROS	SAN	SRP	SBK	STR	TRO	VIK	VÅL
Bodø/Glimt	—	2–2	2–0	3–0	2–0	2–0	0–2	1–1	2–2	1–0	2–1	4–1	7–2	3–0	2–2	1–0
Brann	1–2	—	1–3	3–1	1–1	1–1	0–1	1–3	2–2	3–2	2–1	1–1	3–0	1–1	0–2	0–3
Haugesund	2–2	1–0	—	3–0	0–3	7–0	1–2	1–3	0–0	1–2	2–1	0–0	2–1	3–0	4–2	3–1
Kristiansund	0–2	3–2	3–2	—	1–0	1–1	2–0	2–0	1–0	2–0	1–3	5–1	1–0	1–1	2–3	2–1
Lillestrøm	0–1	2–3	2–1	0–0	—	2–1	1–1	1–0	2–0	2–0	2–0	3–0	4–1	1–2	1–3	0–0
Mjøndalen	0–3	1–1	3–0	5–0	1–2	—	0–0	1–2	1–2	1–1	1–3	1–2	1–1	2–3	0–1	1–1
Molde	0–2	4–0	5–4	2–0	3–3	4–0	—	5–0	4–1	3–1	4–1	2–1	3–0	3–0	2–2	2–3
Odd	1–0	3–3	4–2	2–4	2–3	2–2	1–3	—	2–2	2–3	1–1	3–1	0–1	3–0	3–2	1–2
Rosenborg	0–0	3–2	0–0	1–0	1–3	3–1	2–3	5–0	—	4–1	0–1	4–2	2–2	3–2	5–0	2–2
Sandefjord	1–0	2–2	1–1	3–2	1–1	0–3	1–3	0–0	1–2	—	2–0	0–3	2–0	1–1	3–0	3–0
Sarpsborg 08	2–2	0–0	0–0	0–1	2–1	1–1	1–0	1–1	1–3	5–0	—	4–1	1–0	0–1	1–2	2–1
Stabæk	0–3	2–0	2–1	3–0	2–3	1–1	0–3	2–2	1–3	0–2	3–1	—	0–0	0–3	1–3	0–2
Strømsgodset	1–1	3–1	0–0	1–2	3–1	1–2	6–0	3–0	2–1	4–0	5–0	2–1	—	1–1	0–1	1–1
Tromsø	2–3	1–1	2–0	0–0	1–2	1–0	3–3	2–0	1–3	1–3	0–2	0–0	1–1	—	0–2	1–1
Viking	1–3	3–1	1–1	3–2	5–1	2–1	3–2	3–1	2–1	2–1	1–2	3–3	1–1	0–1	—	4–1
Vålerenga	1–1	1–0	2–1	1–2	2–2	2–0	1–1	1–1	1–1	3–1	4–1	3–1	3–0	1–1	1–1	—

Source: Football Association of Norway (in Norwegian)
Legend: Blue = home team win; Yellow = draw; Red = away team win.

== Relegation play-offs ==
The 14th-placed team in the Eliteserien, Brann, played against the winners of the First Division promotion play-offs, Jerv, on neutral ground to decide who would play in the Eliteserien next season.

15 December 2021
19:00 CET

Brann	4–4 (a.e.t.)	Jerv
Heggebø 49'; Skaanes 114'; Sakor 116'; Nilsen 120'	Report	Wichne 29'; Campos 93' (pen.), 112'; Ibrahim 117'
Penalties
Simba (penalty scored); Rasmussen (penalty scored); Heggebø (penalty scored); Sakor (penalty missed); Nilsen (penalty scored); Skaanes (penalty scored); Blomberg (penalty scored); Kolskogen (penalty scored); Taylor (penalty missed)	7–8	(penalty scored) Campos; (penalty scored) Wichmann; (penalty scored) Arrocha; (penalty missed) Norheim; (penalty scored) Sandberg; (penalty scored) Furtado; (penalty scored) Schröter; (penalty scored) Solli; (penalty scored) Ibrahim

Intility Arena, Oslo
Attendance: 600
Referee: Svein Oddvar Moen

4–4 after extra time. Jerv won 8–7 on penalties and were promoted to the Eliteserien; Brann were relegated to the Norwegian First Division.

== Season statistics ==
=== Top scorers ===
As of 12 December 2021

Rank	Player	Club	Goals
1	(Norway) Ohi Omoijuanfo	Molde	27
2	(Norway) Thomas Lehne Olsen	Lillestrøm	26
3	(Norway) Veton Berisha	Viking	22
4	(Norway) Erik Botheim	Bodø/Glimt	15
5	(Norway) Mushaga Bakenga	Odd	11
5	(Iceland) Viðar Jónsson	Sandefjord	11
5	(Mali) Ibrahima Koné	Sarpsborg 08	11
5	(Sweden) Stefano Vecchia	Rosenborg	11
9	(Norway) Jonathan Lindseth	Sarpsborg 08	10

=== Hat-tricks ===
Player	For	Against	Result	Date
(Norway) Ohi Omoijuanfo	Molde	Brann	4–0 (H)	16 May 2021
(Norway) Kristoffer Zachariassen	Rosenborg	Brann	3–2 (H)	20 May 2021
(Norway) Mushaga Bakenga	Odd	Brann	3–1 (A)	20 June 2021
(Norway) Ohi Omoijuanfo	Molde	Haugesund	5–4 (H)	8 August 2021
(Norway) Tobias Lauritsen	Odd	Haugesund	4–2 (H)	15 August 2021
(Norway) Amahl Pellegrino	Bodø/Glimt	Kristiansund	3–0 (H)	22 August 2021
(Mali) Ibrahima Koné ^{4}	Sarpsborg 08	Sandefjord	5–0 (H)	29 August 2021
(Senegal) Alioune Ndour	Haugesund	Mjøndalen	7–0 (H)	17 October 2021
(Norway) Veton Berisha	Viking	Lillestrøm	5–1 (H)	23 October 2021
(Norway) Moses Mawa	Kristiansund	Odd	4–2 (A)	7 November 2021
(Norway) Thomas Lehne Olsen	Lillestrøm	Strømsgodset	4–1 (H)	27 November 2021

Notes

^{4} Player scored 4 goals
(H) – Home team
(A) – Away team

=== Clean sheets ===
As of 12 December 2021

Rank	Player	Club	Clean sheets
1	(Russia) Nikita Khaykin	Bodø/Glimt	13
2	(Republic of Ireland) Sean McDermott	Kristiansund	9
2	(Norway) Egil Selvik	Haugesund	9
4	(Norway) Mads Hedenstad Christiansen	Lillestrøm	8
4	(Norway) Jacob Karlstrøm	Tromsø	8
4	(Sweden) Andreas Linde	Molde	8
7	(Norway) Anders Kristiansen	Sarpsborg 08	7
7	(Norway) Jacob Storevik	Sandefjord	7
9	(Norway) Viljar Myhra	Strømsgodset	6
9	(Sweden) Marcus Sandberg	Stabæk	6

=== Discipline ===
As of 12 December 2021

==== Player ====
- Most yellow cards: 8
  - (Norway) Lars Ranger (Lillestrøm)
- Most red cards: 1
17 players
- (Sweden) Adam Andersson (Rosenborg)
- (Norway) Martin Bjørnbak (Molde)
- (Slovenia) David Brekalo (Viking)
- (Iceland) Patrik Gunnarsson (Viking)
- (Norway) Kornelius Normann Hansen (Stabæk)
- (Norway) Markus Henriksen (Rosenborg)
- (Norway) Anders Jenssen (Tromsø)
- (Norway) Fredrik Pallesen Knudsen (Brann)
- (Mali) Ibrahima Koné (Sarpsborg 08)
- (Senegal) Alioune Ndour (Haugesund)
- (Nigeria) Igoh Ogbu (Lillestrøm)
- (Norway) Birk Risa (Molde)
- (Sweden) Anton Salétros (Sarpsborg 08)
- (Sweden) Marcus Sandberg (Stabæk)
- (Netherlands) Ian Smeulers (Sandefjord)
- (Sweden) Albin Sporrong (Mjøndalen)
- (Norway) Gustav Valsvik (Strømsgodset)

==== Club ====
- Most yellow cards: 53
  - Sarpsborg 08
  - Stabæk
- Most red cards: 2
  - Molde
  - Rosenborg
  - Sarpsborg 08
  - Stabæk
  - Viking

== Awards ==
=== Monthly awards ===
Month	Coach of the Month		Player of the Month		Young Player of the Month		References
Month	Coach	Club	Player	Club	Player	Club	References
May	(Norway) Christian Michelsen	Kristiansund	(Norway) Kristoffer Zachariassen	Rosenborg	(Norway) Erik Botheim	Bodø/Glimt	
June	(Norway) Erling Moe	Molde	(Norway) Ohi Omoijuanfo	Molde	(Norway) Mads Hedenstad Christiansen	Lillestrøm	
July	(Norway) Geir Bakke	Lillestrøm	(Norway) Thomas Lehne Olsen	Lillestrøm	Not awarded		
August	(Norway) Bjarte Lunde Aarsheim (Norway) Morten Jensen	Viking	(New Zealand) Joe Bell	Viking	(Norway) Osame Sahraoui	Vålerenga	
September	(Norway) Eirik Horneland	Brann	(Sweden) Stefano Vecchia	Rosenborg	(Norway) Noah Holm	Rosenborg	
October	(Norway) Kjetil Knutsen	Bodø/Glimt	(Norway) Ola Solbakken	Bodø/Glimt	(Norway) August Mikkelsen	Tromsø	
November	(Norway) Lars Bohinen	Sarpsborg 08	(Norway) Magnus Wolff Eikrem	Molde	(Norway) Hugo Vetlesen	Bodø/Glimt	

=== Annual awards ===
Award	Winner	Club
Coach of the Year	(Norway) Kjetil Knutsen	Bodø/Glimt
Player of the Year	(Norway) Patrick Berg	Bodø/Glimt
Young Player of the Year	(Norway) Mads Hedenstad Christiansen	Lillestrøm

== League attendances ==
Pos	Team	Total	High	Low	Average	Change
1	Rosenborg	81,051	17,439	600	6,235	+1,930.9%
2	Viking	76,513	14,105	600	5,465	+1,541.1%
3	Brann	64,680	13,524	600	4,975	+1,394.0%
4	Vålerenga	52,017	7,084	50	4,100	+1,950.0%
5	Lillestrøm	41,559	10,504	20	3,197	+1,498.5%^{1}
6	Odd	32,697	6,655	1,600	2,515	+746.8%
7	Molde	41,381	7,325	600	2,956	+721.1%
8	Strømsgodset	36,706	7,150	200	2,384	+842.3%
9	Sarpsborg 08	37,243	5,409	200	2,660	+951.4%
10	Haugesund	31,884	5,166	600	2,453	+636.6%
11	Bodø/Glimt	29,997	4,417	600	2,143	+543.5%
12	Kristiansund	25,983	4,444	600	1,999	+455.3%
13	Sandefjord	25,548	4,673	600	1,825	+470.3%
14	Stabæk	22,522	2,420	600	1,609	+659.0%
15	Tromsø	22,394	2,981	600	1,723	+417.4%^{1}
16	Mjøndalen	17,182	2,408	200	1,322	+422.5%
	League total	639,357	17,439	20	3,059	+936.9%

Updated to games played on 21 November 2021
Source: nifs.no
Notes:
1: Team played last season in 1. divisjon.
