= 2015 Tippeligaen =

71st season of top-tier football league in Norway

Tippeligaen
- Season: 2015
- Dates: 6 April – 8 November
- Champions: Rosenborg; 23rd title
- Relegated: Mjøndalen; Sandefjord
- Champions League: Rosenborg
- Europa League: Strømsgodset; Stabæk; Odd
- Matches: 240
- Goals: 774 (3.23 per match)
- Top goalscorer: Alexander Søderlund (22 goals)
- Biggest home win: Molde 6–1 Sandefjord (30 May 2015); Bodø/Glimt 6–1 Stabæk (8 November 2015)
- Biggest away win: Haugesund 0–6 Rosenborg (12 April 2015); Tromsø 0–6 Strømsgodset (2 August 2015)
- Highest scoring: Tromsø 4–5 Vålerenga (12 May 2015); Mjøndalen 3–6 Odd (2 August 2015)
- Longest winning run: 6 games Bodø/Glimt (9 August 2015)
- Longest unbeaten run: 11 games Strømsgodset (8 November 2015)
- Longest winless run: 15 games Sandefjord (2 August 2015)
- Longest losing run: 8 games Sandefjord (6 June 2015)
- Highest attendance: 21,401; Rosenborg 1–1 Molde (27 June 2015)
- Lowest attendance: 1,949; Mjøndalen 4–3 Tromsø (9 May 2015)
- Average attendance: 6,711 ▼3.6%

The 2015 Tippeligaen was the 71st completed season of top-tier football in Norway. The competition began on 6 April 2015, one week later than in the previous season. A short summer-break in June was scheduled between the rounds played on 12 July and 26 July, and the decisive match was played on 8 November 2015. Molde were the defending champions. Sandefjord, Tromsø and Mjøndalen joined as the promoted clubs from the 2014 1. divisjon. They replaced Brann, Sogndal and Sandnes Ulf who were relegated to the 2015 1. divisjon.

== Teams ==
The league was contested by 16 teams: the 13 best teams of the 2014 season; the two teams who won direct promotion from the 2014 1. divisjon, Sandefjord and Tromsø; and Mjøndalen, who won the promotion/relegation play-off finals against Brann.

=== Stadia and locations ===
Locations of the teams in 2015 Tippeligaen

Note: Table lists in alphabetical order.

Team	Ap.	Location	Arena	Turf	Capacity
Aalesund	14	Ålesund	Color Line Stadion	Artificial	10,778
Bodø/Glimt	21	Bodø	Aspmyra Stadion	Artificial	7,354
Haugesund	9	Haugesund	Haugesund Stadion	Natural	8,754
Lillestrøm	52	Lillestrøm	Åråsen Stadion	Natural	12,250
Molde	39	Molde	Aker Stadion	Artificial	11,800
Mjøndalen	19	Mjøndalen	Isachsen Stadion	Artificial	4,350
Odd	34	Skien	Skagerak Arena	Artificial	12,500
Rosenborg	52	Trondheim	Lerkendal Stadion	Natural	21,166
Sandefjord	5	Sandefjord	Komplett.no Arena	Natural	6,000
Sarpsborg 08	4	Sarpsborg	Sarpsborg Stadion	Artificial	4,700
Stabæk	19	Bærum	Nadderud Stadion	Natural	7,000
Start	39	Kristiansand	Sør Arena	Artificial	14,563
Strømsgodset	28	Drammen	Marienlyst Stadion	Artificial	8,935
Tromsø	28	Tromsø	Alfheim Stadion	Artificial	6,859
Vålerenga	55	Oslo	Ullevaal Stadion	Natural	28,000
Viking	66	Stavanger	Viking Stadion	Natural	16,600

=== Personnel and kits ===
Team	Manager	Kit manufacturer	Sponsor
Aalesund	(Norway) Trond Fredriksen (interim)	Umbro	Sparebanken Møre
Bodø/Glimt	(Norway) Jan Halvor Halvorsen	Diadora	Sparebank 1 Nord-Norge
Haugesund	(Norway) Jostein Grindhaug	Macron	Sparebanken Vest
Lillestrøm	(Iceland) Rúnar Kristinsson	Legea	DNB
Molde	(Norway) Ole Gunnar Solskjær	Nike	Sparebanken Møre
Mjøndalen	(Norway) Vegard Hansen	Umbro	Sparebanken Øst
Odd	(Norway) Dag-Eilev Fagermo	New Balance	Skagerak Energi
Rosenborg	(Norway) Kåre Ingebrigtsen	Adidas	SpareBank 1 SMN
Sandefjord	(Norway) Lars Bohinen	Macron	Jotun
Sarpsborg 08	(Norway) Geir Bakke	Select	Borregaard
Stabæk	(United States) Bob Bradley	Adidas	Sparebank 1 Oslo Akershus
Start	(Norway) Bård Borgersen (interim)	Umbro	Sparebanken Sør
Strømsgodset	(Norway) Bjørn Petter Ingebretsen	Diadora	DNB
Tromsø	(Norway) Bård Flovik (interim)	Select	Sparebank 1 Nord-Norge
Vålerenga	(Norway) Kjetil Rekdal	Adidas	DNB
Viking	(Sweden) Kjell Jonevret	Diadora	Lyse

=== Managerial changes ===
Team	Outgoing manager	Manner of departure	Date of vacancy	Table	Incoming manager	Date of appointment	Table
Aalesund	(Sweden) Jan Jönsson	Mutual agreement	30 November 2014	Pre-season	(Norway) Harald Aabrekk	1 January 2015	Pre-season
Lillestrøm	(Sweden) Magnus Haglund	Mutual agreement	30 November 2014	Pre-season	(Iceland) Rúnar Kristinsson	1 January 2015	Pre-season
Sarpsborg 08	(England) Brian Deane	Mutual agreement	30 November 2014	Pre-season	(Norway) Geir Bakke	1 January 2015	Pre-season
Aalesund	(Norway) Harald Aabrekk	Sacked	28 April 2015	16th	(Norway) Trond Fredriksen (interim)	28 April 2015	16th
Strømsgodset	(Denmark) David Nielsen	Mutual agreement	26 May 2015	9th	(Norway) Bjørn Petter Ingebretsen	26 May 2015	9th
Molde	(Norway) Tor Ole Skullerud	Sacked	6 August 2015	7th	(Norway) Erling Moe (interim)	7 August 2015	7th
Molde	(Norway) Erling Moe	Caretaker period ended	21 October 2015	7th	(Norway) Ole Gunnar Solskjær	21 October 2015	7th
Tromsø	(Norway) Steinar Nilsen	Sacked	18 August 2015	15th	(Norway) Bård Flovik (interim)	18 August 2015	15th
Start	(Norway) Mons Ivar Mjelde	Mutual agreement	7 September 2015	13th	(Norway) Bård Borgersen (interim)	7 September 2015	13th

== League table ==
Pos	Team	Pld	W	D	L	GF	GA	GD	Pts	Qualification or relegation
1	Rosenborg (C)	30	21	6	3	73	27	+46	69	Qualification for the Champions League second qualifying round (Note: Rosenborg qualified for the Europa League second qualifying round by winning the 2015 Norwegian Cup. However, since they already qualified for European competition based on their league position, the spot awarded to the cup winners was passed down the league.)
2	Strømsgodset	30	17	6	7	67	44	+23	57	Qualification for the Europa League second qualifying round
3	Stabæk	30	17	5	8	54	43	+11	56	Qualification for the Europa League first qualifying round
4	Odd	30	15	10	5	61	41	+20	55	Qualification for the Europa League first qualifying round
5	Viking	30	17	2	11	53	39	+14	53	
6	Molde	30	15	7	8	62	31	+31	52	
7	Vålerenga	30	14	7	9	49	41	+8	49	
8	Lillestrøm (Note: Lillestrøm started the season with a one point deduction due to poor financial reporting.)	30	12	9	9	45	43	+2	44	
9	Bodø/Glimt	30	12	4	14	53	56	−3	40	
10	Aalesund	30	11	5	14	42	57	−15	38	
11	Sarpsborg 08	30	8	10	12	37	49	−12	34	
12	Haugesund	30	8	7	15	33	52	−19	31	
13	Tromsø	30	7	8	15	36	50	−14	29	
14	Start (O)	30	5	7	18	35	64	−29	22	Qualification for the relegation play-offs
15	Mjøndalen (R)	30	4	9	17	38	69	−31	21	Relegation to First Division
16	Sandefjord (R)	30	4	4	22	36	68	−32	16	Relegation to First Division

Source: Football Association of Norway (in Norwegian), Soccerway
Rules for classification: 1) Points; 2) Goal difference; 3) Goals scored; 4) Head-to-head points; 5) Head-to-head goal difference; 6) Head-to-head away goals scored (between two teams).
(C) Champions; (O) Play-off winners; (R) Relegated

== Positions by round ==
Team ╲ Round	1	2	3	4	5	6	7	8	9	10	11	12	13	14	15	16	17	18	19	20	21	22	23	24	25	26	27	28	29	30
Rosenborg	1	1	2	1	1	1	1	1	1	1	1	1	1	1	1	1	1	1	1	1	1	1	1	1	1	1	1	1	1	1
Strømsgodset	14	11	12	10	12	13	9	11	9	9	8	8	7	7	6	5	5	5	5	6	6	5	5	5	3	3	3	2	2	2
Stabæk	7	12	9	5	5	2	2	2	2	2	2	2	2	2	2	2	3	2	2	2	2	2	2	2	2	2	2	3	3	3
Odd	9	2	1	2	4	5	5	3	5	6	5	5	6	6	7	7	6	6	6	5	5	4	4	4	4	4	4	4	4	4
Viking	12	9	10	12	9	7	7	7	4	4	6	6	4	3	5	4	4	4	4	3	3	3	3	3	5	5	5	5	5	5
Molde	8	7	4	4	2	4	3	5	6	5	4	4	5	5	4	6	7	7	7	7	7	7	7	7	7	7	7	7	6	6
Vålerenga	3	3	3	3	3	3	6	4	3	3	3	3	3	4	3	3	2	3	3	4	4	6	6	6	6	6	6	6	7	7
Lillestrøm	16	10	11	13	10	11	13	10	8	8	7	7	8	8	8	8	8	8	10	10	9	9	9	9	8	9	8	8	8	8
Bodø/Glimt	13	16	16	15	16	16	16	16	15	16	15	15	15	15	13	12	9	9	8	8	8	8	8	8	9	8	9	9	10	9
Aalesund	15	13	15	16	15	10	8	9	11	12	10	10	10	11	10	10	12	10	9	9	10	10	10	11	11	10	10	10	9	10
Sarpsborg 08	5	6	8	9	6	6	4	6	7	7	9	9	9	9	11	11	11	13	12	12	12	12	12	12	12	12	12	11	11	11
Haugesund	6	14	14	14	13	9	12	13	13	11	13	13	13	13	14	13	13	11	11	11	11	11	11	10	10	11	11	12	12	12
Tromsø	11	15	13	11	14	15	15	15	16	15	14	14	14	14	15	14	14	14	14	15	15	15	14	15	14	14	13	13	13	13
Start	10	4	6	8	11	8	11	12	12	13	12	12	12	10	9	9	10	12	13	13	13	13	15	13	13	13	14	14	14	14
Mjøndalen	4	5	7	7	8	14	10	8	10	10	11	11	11	12	12	15	15	15	15	14	14	14	13	14	15	15	15	15	15	15
Sandefjord	2	8	5	6	7	12	14	14	14	14	16	16	16	16	16	16	16	16	16	16	16	16	16	16	16	16	16	16	16	16

Leader
2016–17 UEFA Europa League First qualifying round
Relegation play-offs
Relegation to 2016–17 1. divisjon

Source: nifs.no

== Relegation play-offs ==
=== Final ===
The 14th-placed team, Start, took part in a two-legged play-off against Jerv, the winners of the 2015 1. divisjon promotion play-offs, to decide who would play in the 2016 Tippeligaen.

21 November 2015
12:00 CET (UTC+1)

Jerv	1–1	Start
Omoijuanfo 86'	Report	Stokkelien 19'

Levermyr Stadion, Grimstad
Attendance: 2,010
Referee: Trygve Kjensli
25 November 2015
19:00 CET (UTC+1)

Start	3–1	Jerv
Hollingen 42'; Børufsen 49'; DeJohn 83'	Report	Antwi 45'

Sør Arena, Kristiansand
Attendance: 12,245
Referee: Tom Harald Hagen

Start won 4–2 on aggregate and retained their place in the 2016 Tippeligaen; Jerv remained in the 1. divisjon.

== Results ==
Home \ Away	AAL	BOD	HAU	LSK	MIF	MFK	ODD	RBK	SF	S08	STB	IKS	SIF	TIL	VIF	VIK
Aalesund	—	2–0	2–1	1–1	4–2	1–2	1–3	0–1	2–1	2–2	1–1	2–0	2–1	0–2	2–0	0–4
Bodø/Glimt	1–0	—	1–2	0–3	5–1	1–3	2–4	1–0	2–1	3–1	6–1	5–1	3–5	1–0	1–1	0–3
Haugesund	3–1	2–4	—	3–3	1–1	0–0	1–2	0–6	2–1	1–1	2–2	0–2	4–0	0–1	0–1	0–2
Lillestrøm	3–1	3–0	2–0	—	3–0	2–1	1–1	0–5	3–2	3–1	0–2	1–1	1–2	1–0	1–1	2–1
Mjøndalen	1–2	1–2	2–1	1–4	—	0–3	3–6	3–2	2–2	1–1	1–4	1–1	2–4	4–3	0–1	1–0
Molde	5–1	1–2	0–1	2–2	3–1	—	1–2	1–0	6–1	0–0	3–3	4–0	3–1	4–0	0–0	4–1
Odd	1–1	2–1	0–0	5–0	2–2	2–2	—	1–2	4–3	1–1	2–0	3–3	2–0	3–2	1–2	1–0
Rosenborg	5–0	1–1	4–3	3–0	1–0	1–1	3–0	—	5–1	3–2	1–0	3–2	1–1	1–1	2–0	2–0
Sandefjord	1–3	3–1	0–1	0–0	2–1	2–4	0–1	1–2	—	1–0	2–4	4–1	1–2	1–1	0–3	1–2
Sarpsborg 08	3–1	2–2	3–0	1–3	2–2	1–4	2–0	0–2	2–1	—	0–1	3–1	1–6	1–0	1–1	0–2
Stabæk	1–4	3–2	1–1	3–2	1–0	1–0	1–2	2–3	4–0	0–0	—	3–2	3–2	2–1	2–0	1–0
Start	3–1	1–1	1–3	0–0	1–1	0–3	0–4	0–4	2–1	1–2	4–1	—	0–1	3–1	2–3	0–3
Strømsgodset	3–1	3–1	5–0	2–0	1–1	1–0	2–1	3–3	3–2	1–1	0–2	2–1	—	2–1	2–2	4–1
Tromsø	1–1	3–1	2–0	1–1	0–0	2–0	2–2	1–1	1–1	0–1	0–2	2–1	0–6	—	4–5	3–1
Vålerenga	1–2	1–2	2–0	2–0	4–2	0–1	2–2	1–2	2–0	3–1	0–2	1–1	3–1	1–0	—	2–4
Viking	4–1	2–1	0–1	1–0	3–1	2–1	1–1	1–4	2–0	3–1	2–1	1–0	1–1	3–1	3–4	—

Source: NIFS (in Norwegian)
Legend: Blue = home team win; Yellow = draw; Red = away team win.

== Season statistics ==
=== Top scorers ===
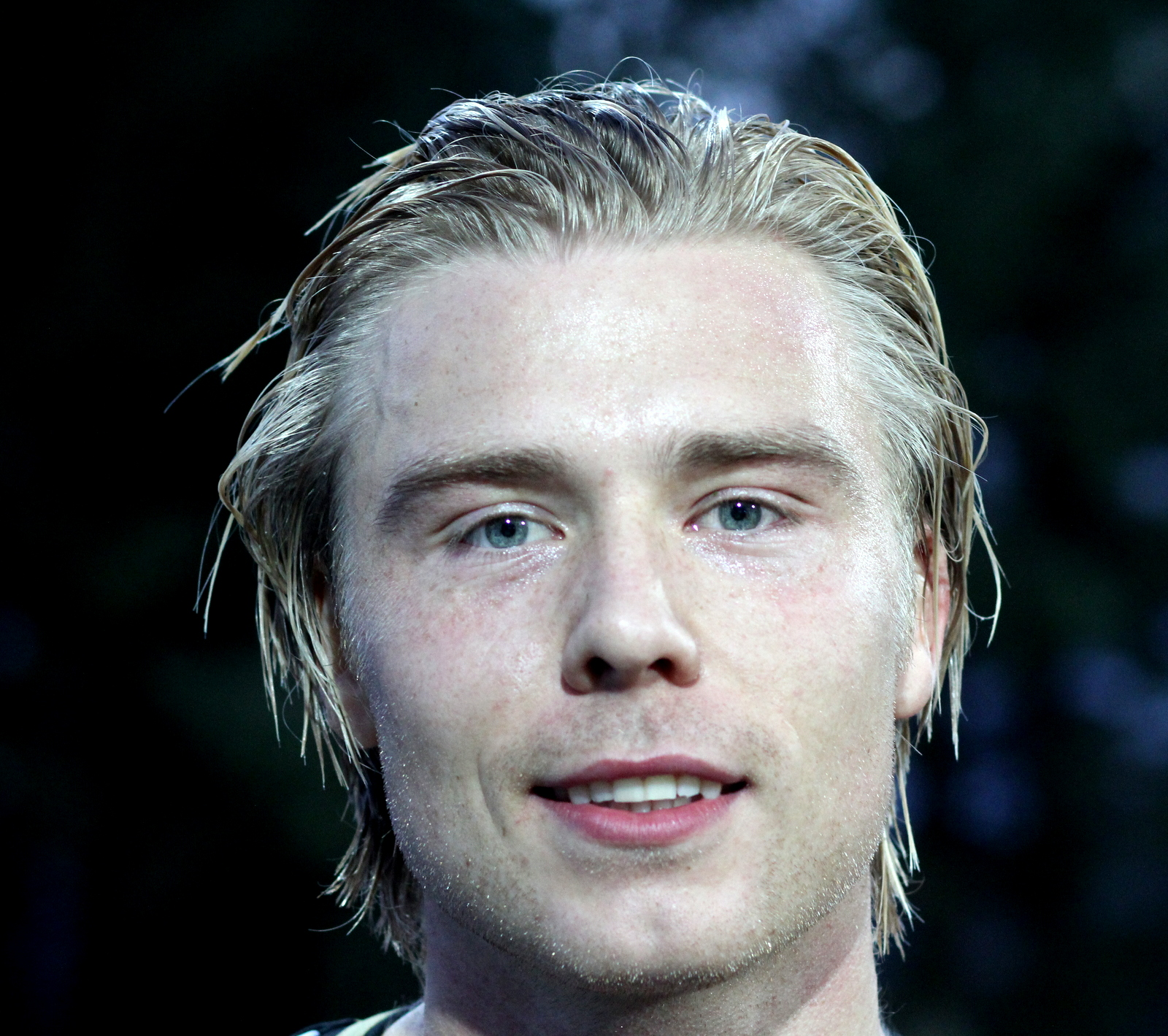
Rosenborgs's Alexander Søderlund became the top scorer in Tippeligaen after scoring 22 goals.

Rank	Player	Club	Goals	Games	Average
1	(Norway) Alexander Søderlund	Rosenborg	22	27	0,81
2	(Norway) Adama Diomande	Stabæk	17	21	0,81
3	(Canada) Olivier Occéan	Odd	15	27	0,56
4	(Norway) Ola Kamara	Molde	14	29	0,48
5	(Norway) Pål André Helland	Rosenborg	13	21	0,62
5	(Norway) Alexander Sørloth	Bodø/Glimt	13	26	0,50
5	(Norway) Trond Olsen	Bodø/Glimt	13	29	0,45
5	(Nigeria) Leke James	Aalesund	13	29	0,45
9	(Norway) Mohamed Elyounoussi	Molde	12	28	0,43
10	(Norway) Marcus Pedersen	Strømsgodset	11	10	1,10
10	(Norway) Veton Berisha	Viking	11	14	0,79
10	(Nigeria) Fred Friday	Lillestrøm	11	26	0,42
10	(Norway) Iver Fossum	Strømsgodset	11	30	0,37

=== Hat-tricks ===
Player	For	Against	Result	Date
(Nigeria) Fred Friday	Lillestrøm	Mjøndalen	4–1 (A)	3 April 2015
(Norway) Tommy Høiland	Molde	Start	4–0 (H)	10 May 2015
(Norway) Adama Diomande	Stabæk	Sandefjord	4–0 (H)	13 May 2015
(Norway) Mohamed Elyounoussi	Molde	Sandefjord	6–1 (H)	30 May 2015
(Norway) Ola Kamara	Molde	Sarpsborg 08	4–1 (A)	3 July 2015
(Denmark) Christian Gytkjær	Haugesund	Lillestrøm	3–3 (H)	4 July 2015
(Denmark) Christian Gytkjær	Haugesund	Aalesund	3–1 (H)	9 August 2015
(Norway) Alexander Sørloth^{4}	Bodø/Glimt	Start	5–1 (H)	9 August 2015
(Norway) Marcus Pedersen	Strømsgodset	Mjøndalen	4–2 (A)	30 August 2015
(Norway) Alexander Sørloth	Bodø/Glimt	Stabæk	6–1 (H)	8 November 2015
(Norway) Fredrik Nordkvelle	Odd	Lillestrøm	5–0 (H)	8 November 2015

Notes

^{4} Player scored 4 goals
(H) – Home team
(A) – Away team

=== Discipline ===
==== Player ====
- Most yellow cards: 8
  - (Denmark) Michael Christensen (Start)
- Most red cards: 1
  - 25 players

==== Club ====
- Most yellow cards: 52
  - Sandefjord
- Most red cards: 3
  - Lillestrøm
  - Molde

=== Attendances ===
Pos	Team	Total	High	Low	Average	Change
1	Rosenborg	270,589	21,401	13,779	18,039	+29.6%
2	Viking	154,080	14,463	7,086	10,272	+2.6%
3	Vålerenga	151,486	20,958	6,908	10,099	+3.5%
4	Molde	134,275	11,113	8,141	8,952	−3.1%
5	Odd	118,674	9,073	6,769	7,912	+10.5%
6	Strømsgodset	105,450	8,468	6,180	7,030	+4.8%
7	Aalesund	100,435	8,287	5,655	6,696	−11.9%
8	Start	92,326	9,239	4,683	6,155	+3.2%
9	Lillestrøm	82,913	9,071	3,881	5,528	−6.3%
10	Haugesund	80,790	6,634	4,533	5,386	−3.5%
11	Sandefjord	61,882	6,174	3,269	4,125	+53.5%^{1}
12	Stabæk	58,204	4,938	3,293	3,880	+1.2%
13	Sarpsborg 08	58,060	5,137	3,151	3,871	−1.9%
14	Tromsø	54,534	5,862	3,080	3,636	+30.9%^{1}
15	Bodø/Glimt	47,762	6,114	2,286	3,184	−5.9%
16	Mjøndalen	39,131	4,150	1,949	2,609	+125.9%^{1}
	League total	1,610,591	21,401	1,949	6,711	−3.6%

Updated to games played on 26 October 2015
Source: nifs.no, fotball.no
Notes:
1: Team played last season in 1. divisjon

== Awards ==
=== Annual awards ===
Award	Winner	Club
Player of the Year	(Norway) Ole Selnæs	Rosenborg
Goalkeeper of the Year	(Norway) Ørjan Nyland	Molde
Defender of the Year	(Norway) Jonas Svensson	Rosenborg
Midfielder of the Year	(Norway) Ole Selnæs	Rosenborg
Striker of the Year	(Norway) Alexander Søderlund	Rosenborg
Manager of the Year	(United States) Bob Bradley	Stabæk
Young Player of the Year	(Norway) Iver Fossum	Strømsgodset
