= Viljar Myhra =

Norwegian footballer (born 1996)

Personal information
- Full name: Viljar Røsholt Myhra
- Date of birth: 21 July 1996 (age 30)
- Place of birth: Skien, Norway
- Height: 1.94 m (6 ft 4 in)
- Position: Goalkeeper

Team information
- Current team: OB
- Number: 16

Youth career
- Astor FK
- Siljan IL
- 2009–2015: Odd

Senior career*
Years	Team	Apps	(Gls)
2015–2018	Odd	7	(0)
2019–2024	Strømsgodset	134	(0)
2024–	OB	59	(0)

International career
2014	Norway U18	3	(0)
2015	Norway U19	1	(0)
2017	Norway U21	2	(0)
- * Club domestic league appearances and goals as of 19 May 2026

Viljar Myhra (born 21 July 1996) is a Norwegian professional footballer who plays as a goalkeeper for Danish Superliga club OB.

== Club career ==
Myhra progressed through Odd's youth academy but failed to make his breakthrough in the first team. On 1 January 2019, following the expiration of his contract with Odd, he signed with Strømsgodset. He initially became the starting goalkeeper at the beginning of the 2019 season but lost his position in May 2019 when head coach Bjørn Petter Ingebretsen stepped down for health reasons. He reclaimed his position as the first-choice goalkeeper at the start of the 2020 season and was honoured as Player of the Season by the local newspaper Drammens Tidende at the season's conclusion.

On 31 January 2024, Myhra signed a five-year contract with Danish Superliga club OB. He immediately established himself as a starter in goal, but was unable to prevent OB from being relegated to the Danish 1st Division for the first time since 1998.

== International career ==
Myhra is a Norway youth international. On 4 October 2021, he received his first call-up to the Norway national team for the 2022 FIFA World Cup qualifiers against Turkey and Montenegro on 8 and 11 October, respectively. He did not make his debut.

== Career statistics ==
=== Club ===
As of match played 11 May 2026

Appearances and goals by club, season and competition
Club	Season	League			National cup		Europe		Total	
Club	Season	Division	Apps	Goals	Apps	Goals	Apps	Goals	Apps	Goals
Odd	2015	Tippeligaen	0	0	1	0	—		1	0
Odd	2016	Tippeligaen	0	0	1	0	—		1	0
Odd	2017	Eliteserien	5	0	3	0	1 (Note: Appearance in UEFA Europa League)	0	9	0
Odd	2018	Eliteserien	2	0	3	0	—		5	0
Odd	Total		7	0	8	0	1	0	16	0
Strømsgodset	2019	Eliteserien	17	0	1	0	—		18	0
Strømsgodset	2020	Eliteserien	30	0	0	0	—		30	0
Strømsgodset	2021	Eliteserien	27	0	1	0	—		28	0
Strømsgodset	2022	Eliteserien	30	0	0	0	—		30	0
Strømsgodset	2023	Eliteserien	30	0	1	0	—		31	0
Strømsgodset	Total		134	0	3	0	—		137	0
OB	2023–24	Danish Superliga	15	0	—		—		15	0
OB	2024–25	Danish 1st Division	21	0	1	0	—		22	0
OB	2025–26	Danish Superliga	23	0	1	0	—		24	0
OB	Total		59	0	2	0	—		61	0
Career total			200	0	13	0	1	0	214	0

== Honours ==
OB

- Danish 1st Division: 2024–25
