= Håkon Wibe-Lund =

Norwegian footballer and manager (born 1980)

Personal information
- Date of birth: 5 September 1980 (age 46)
- Position: Defender

Team information
- Current team: Strømsgodset (assistant)

Youth career
- Berger
- Svelvik
- NTG
- Lyn

Senior career*
Years	Team	Apps	(Gls)
2000	→ Fossum (loan)		
2001	Asker		
2002–2006	Kongsvinger	77	(0)
2007	Hønefoss		

Managerial career
- 2007: Svelvik
- 2008–2012: Hønefoss (player developer)
- 2013: Fredrikstad (assistant)
- 2013–2015: Fredrikstad
- 2015–2021: Strømsgodset (assistant)
- 2019: → Strømsgodset (caretaker)
- 2021–2022: Strømsgodset
- 2023: Odd (assistant)
- 2024: Häcken (assistant)
- 2025–: Strømsgodset (assistant)
- * Club domestic league appearances and goals

Håkon Wibe-Lund (born 5 September 1980) is a retired Norwegian football defender and current assistant manager for Strømsgodset in Eliteserien.

He hails from Svelvik and started his career in minnows Berger and Svelvik. He attended the Norwegian School of Elite Sport, playing for the school team and Lyn. Without reaching Lyn's first team, he was loaned out to Fossum in the autumn of 2000 before transferring to Asker in 2001.

Ahead of the 2002 season he went on to Kongsvinger, a former first-tier team now on the third tier. He registered 77 league games, but lost the 2004 season to injury. He joined second-tier club Hønefoss BK in 2007, but more injuries led him to retire and instead became player developer. He had already coached Svelvik.

In 2013 he became player developer and assistant coach of Fredrikstad under Lars Bakkerud, taking over as caretaker manager already in June the same year. Both Lars Bakkerud and director of sports Joacim Jonsson were on illness absence, and when Bakkerud still had not returned at the end of the season, Wibe-Lund got the job permanently on a two-year contract.

He resigned from Fredrikstad in May 2015 following six league matches without victory as well as a cup exit, only to become assistant coach of Strømsgodset in August 2015. In the summer 2019, manager Bjørn Petter Ingebretsen abruptly resigned amid health concerns, and Wibe-Lund became caretaking manager. His last outing as caretaker was a third-round cup exit against third-tier IF Fram Larvik on 19 June. He again became caretaker in April 2021, this time together with Bjørn Petter Ingebretsen, following the sacking of Henrik Pedersen.

Ahead of the 2023 season, Wibe-Lund was hired as assistant manager of Odds BK. As manager Pål Arne Johansen was bought by BK Häcken after the 2023 season, Wibe-Lund followed him as assistant manager there, but both were sacked in 2024 after nine months in the club. In 2025, Strømsgodset found themselves in a relegation spot. The club sacked the manager and hired Dag-Eilev Fagermo. As he did not manage to record any wins either, Håkon Wibe-Lund was also brought on board as assistant manager in late July 2025.

== Honours ==
Individual

- Eliteserien Coach of the Month: May 2022
