= Erling Moe =

Norwegian football coach (born 1970)

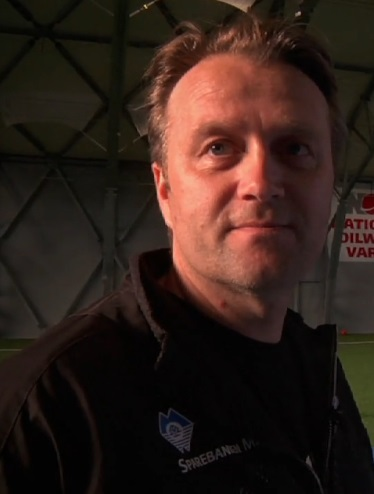

Personal information
- Full name: Erling Hagset Moe
- Date of birth: 22 July 1970 (age 56)
- Place of birth: Molde, Norway

Senior career*
| Years | Team | Apps | (Gls) |
| 19??–1996 | Træff | | |

Managerial career
- 1999–2002: Træff
- 2011: Kristiansund
- 2015: Molde
- 2015–2018: Molde (assistant)
- 2019–2024: Molde
- 2025: Beşiktaş (assistant)
- 2026: Kayserispor
- * Club domestic league appearances and goals

Erling Hagset Moe (born 22 July 1970) is a Norwegian professional football coach and former player. In his active playing career, Moe played for Træff until he was 26 years old.

== Coaching career ==
Moe was head coach at Træff from 1999 to 2002. During Moe's period as Træff's head coach, the club played in 2. divisjon, the third-highest level in Norwegian football. The team was relegated to the 3. divisjon in his last season at the club. Moe has been a part of the coaching staff at Molde since 2005, with the exception of being head coach in third tier club Kristiansund for the second half of the 2011 season. On 7 August 2015, he took over as manager for the club after Tor Ole Skullerud was sacked. He was appointed as caretaker until the club found a new manager. Ole Gunnar Solskjær was appointed on 21 October 2015 and Moe went back to his former role as first team coach. Moe again took caretaker charge in December 2018, when Solskjær was appointed interim manager of Manchester United. On 29 April 2019, Moe signed as permanent head coach till the end of the 2020 season.

The 2019 season, Moe's first full season as Molde's head coach ended with Molde winning the league title with 68 points, undefeated at home and with a 14 point gap margin to runners-up Bodø/Glimt. Of Molde's four title wins in history, this was won with the biggest title-winning margin.

== Personal life ==
Moe has stated that he is a fan of English club Coventry City.

== Managerial statistics ==
As of match played 17 May 2026

Managerial record by team and tenure
| Team | From | To | Record | | | | |
| Team | From | To | P | W | D | L | Win % |
|---|---|---|---|---|---|---|---|
| Kristiansund | 25 July 2011 | 22 October 2011 | 13 | 10 | 2 | 1 | 76.92 |
| Molde | 7 August 2015 | 20 October 2015 | 15 | 7 | 4 | 4 | 46.67 |
| Molde | 19 December 2018 | 8 December 2024 | 274 | 169 | 39 | 66 | 61.68 |
| Kayserispor | 25 February 2026 | 30 May 2026 | 11 | 3 | 2 | 6 | 27.27 |
| Total | | | 313 | 189 | 47 | 77 | 60.38 |

== Honours ==
Molde

- Eliteserien: 2019, 2022
- Norwegian Cup: 2021–22

Individual

- Eliteserien Coach of the Month: June 2021, August 2022, September 2022, October 2022, September 2024
- Eliteserien Coach of the Year: 2022
