= Eirik Kjønø =

Norwegian football coach (born 1991)

Personal information
- Date of birth: 27 February 1991 (age 35)
- Height: 1.74 m (5 ft 9 in)
- Position: Midfielder

Youth career
- –2007: Våg
- 2007–2009: Falkirk
- 2009–2010: Vindbjart

Senior career*
Years	Team	Apps	(Gls)
2010–2013	Vindbjart	17	(1)
2014–2016	Grorud	7	(0)

Managerial career
- 2012: Ready
- 2014–2018: Grorud (assistant)
- 2018–2021: Grorud
- 2021: Stabæk (assistant)
- 2021–2022: Stabæk
- 2023: Jerv
- * Club domestic league appearances and goals

Eirik Kjønø (born 27 February 1991) is a Norwegian football coach and former player.

== Playing career ==
Kjønø started his youth career with Kristiansand-based side Våg. In the summer of 2007, he joined Scottish side Falkirk on a two-year contract. He returned to Norway and Vindbjart in April 2009.

== Managerial career ==
Kjønø's first club as manager was Oslo-based club Ready, which he managed in 2012. In 2014, he joined Grorud as an assistant coach, before being promoted to head coach in 2018. The club achieved promotion to the Norwegian First Division under his management in 2019. On 4 February 2021, he was appointed assistant coach of Eliteserien club Stabæk. Following Jan Jönsson's exit from the club, Kjønø was promoted to head coach on 9 July 2021. Stabæk ended the 2021 season with relegation to the Norwegian First Division. After re-promotion came in jeopardy, Kjønø was sacked on 16 August 2022. He worked in the Football Association for a while before being hired as FK Jerv's new manager in August 2023. He was sacked after only 84 days in the job.

== Honours ==
- Young manager of the year in Norway: 2018, 2019
