= Marcus Sandberg =

Swedish footballer (born 1990)

Personal information
- Full name: Robert Marcus Sandberg
- Date of birth: 7 November 1990 (age 35)
- Place of birth: Rönnäng, Sweden
- Height: 1.91 m (6 ft 3 in)
- Position: Goalkeeper

Team information
- Current team: HamKam
- Number: 12

Youth career
- –2006: Rönnängs FF
- 2006–2008: IFK Göteborg

Senior career*
Years	Team	Apps	(Gls)
2008–2015	IFK Göteborg	43	(0)
2012	→ Ljungskile SK (loan)	26	(0)
2016–2018	Vålerenga	32	(0)
2018–2023	Stabæk	131	(0)
2023–	HamKam	94	(0)

International career^{‡}
2010	Sweden U19	1	(0)
2011	Sweden U21	3	(0)
- * Club domestic league appearances and goals as of 27 July 2026 ‡ National team caps and goals as of 13 June 2012

Marcus Sandberg (born 7 November 1990) is a Swedish professional footballer who plays for Eliteserien club HamKam as a goalkeeper.

== Career statistics ==
As of 27 July 2026

Appearances and goals by club, season and competition
Club	Season	League			Cup		Continental		Total	
Club	Season	Division	Apps	Goals	Apps	Goals	Apps	Goals	Apps	Goals
IFK Göteborg	2008	Allsvenskan	0	0	0	0	0	0	0	0
IFK Göteborg	2009	Allsvenskan	0	0	2	0	0	0	2	0
IFK Göteborg	2010	Allsvenskan	15	0	2	0	2	0	19	0
IFK Göteborg	2011	Allsvenskan	17	0	3	0	—		20	0
IFK Göteborg	2013	Allsvenskan	0	0	0	0	0	0	0	0
IFK Göteborg	2014	Allsvenskan	11	0	1	0	4	0	16	0
IFK Göteborg	2015	Allsvenskan	0	0	3	0	0	0	3	0
IFK Göteborg	Total		43	0	11	0	6	0	60	0
Ljungskile SK (loan)	2012	Superettan	26	0	0	0	—		26	0
Vålerenga	2016	Tippeligaen	16	0	1	0	—		17	0
Vålerenga	2017	Eliteserien	16	0	2	0	—		18	0
Vålerenga	2018	Eliteserien	0	0	1	0	—		1	0
Vålerenga	Total		32	0	4	0	0	0	36	0
Stabæk	2018	Eliteserien	12	0	0	0	—		12	0
Stabæk	2019	Eliteserien	30	0	3	0	—		33	0
Stabæk	2020	Eliteserien	30	0	0	0	—		30	0
Stabæk	2021	Eliteserien	29	0	3	0	—		32	0
Stabæk	2022	OBOS-ligaen	30	0	0	0	—		30	0
Stabæk	Total		131	0	6	0	0	0	137	0
HamKam	2023	Eliteserien	23	0	3	0	—		26	0
HamKam	2024	Eliteserien	30	0	0	0	—		30	0
HamKam	2025	Eliteserien	27	0	2	0	—		29	0
HamKam	2026	Eliteserien	14	0	1	0	—		15	0
HamKam	Total		94	0	6	0	0	0	100	0
Career total			336	0	17	0	6	0	349	0

== Honours ==
IFK Göteborg

- Svenska Cupen: 2012–13, 2014–15
