= Christian Michelsen (footballer) =

Norwegian footballer and coach (born 1976)

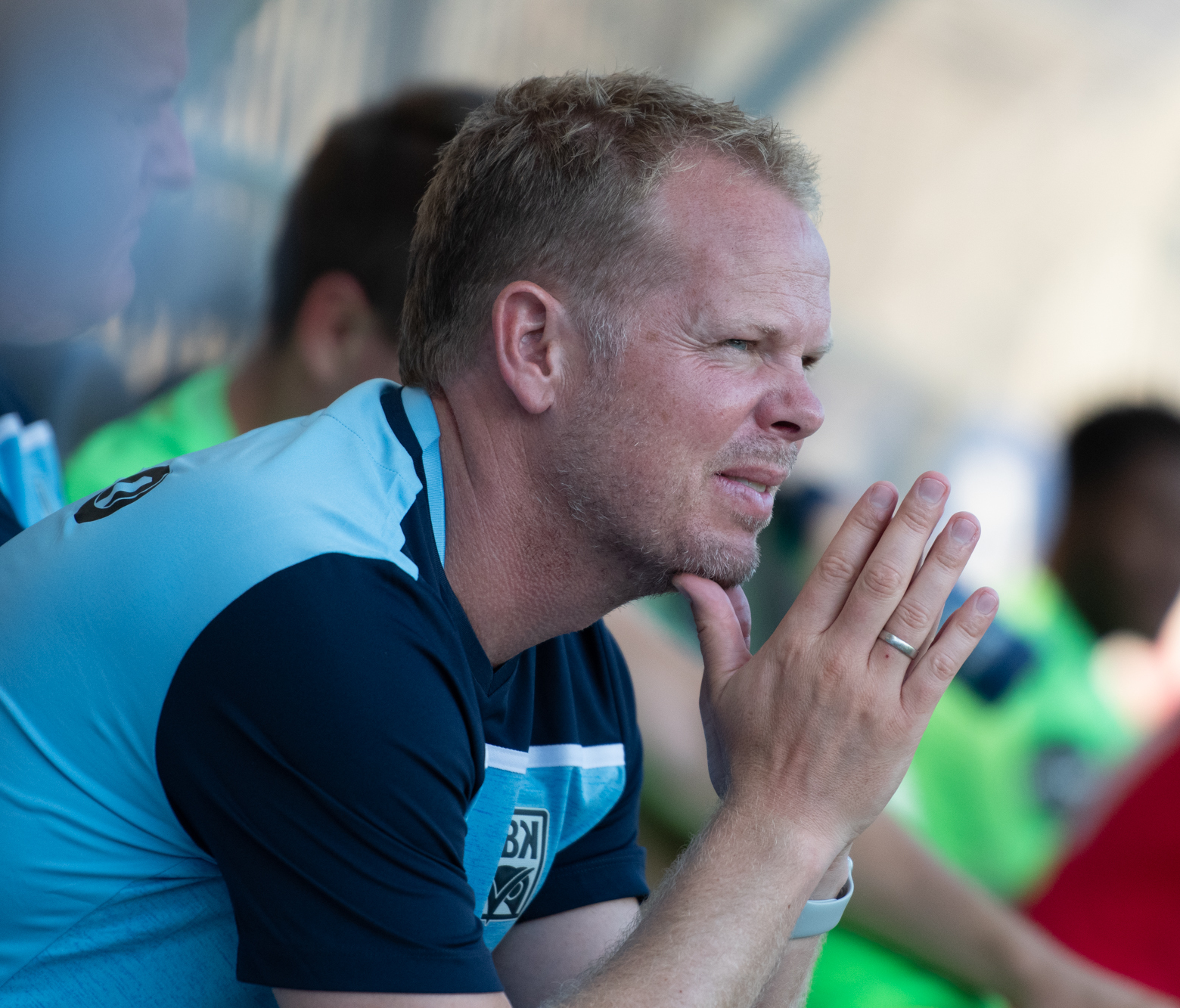

Personal information
- Full name: Christian Magnus Thim Michelsen
- Date of birth: 14 March 1976 (age 50)
- Place of birth: Kristiansund, Norway
- Position: Midfielder

Senior career*
| Years | Team | Apps | (Gls) |
| –1999 | Clausenengen | | |
| 1999–2003 | Stabæk | 87 | (13) |
| 2004–2007 | Moss | 110 | (22) |
| 2008–2012 | Kristiansund | | |

Managerial career
- 2012–2013: Kristiansund (assistant)
- 2014–2023: Kristiansund
- 2024–2025: Sarpsborg 08
- * Club domestic league appearances and goals

Christian Magnus Thim Michelsen (born 14 March 1976) is a Norwegian football coach and former player who was most recently the head coach of Sarpsborg 08.

== Playing career ==
He started his senior career in Clausenengen FK, then played for Stabæk in the Tippeligaen. From 1999 to 2003 he appeared 87 times in the Norwegian top flight with Stabæk, scoring 12 goals. 11 goals were scored in the 2000 season. After the 2003 season he signed with Moss FK. He joined Kristiansund BK ahead of the 2008 season. He retired after the 2012 season.

== Coaching career ==
After his retirement as active footballer in 2012, Michelsen became Geir Bakke's assistant coach at Kristiansund. He took over as head coach ahead of the 2014 season, when Bakke left the club to become assistant coach at Molde. In 2016, Michelsen led his team to promotion to the 2017 Eliteserien, which was Kristiansund BK's first season in the top division of Norwegian football. Michelsen's team surprised with a seventh place in their debut in the first tier. Kristiansund finished in fifth place in the 2018 season, an achievement that led to a Coach of the Year nomination for Michelsen. On 4 July 2019, Kristiansund announced that Michelsen had signed a contract extension which will keep him at the club till the end of the 2023 season. This has later been extended to 2025.

Kristiansund BK suffered its first relegation in the club's history in the 2022 Eliteserien. When re-promotion came in jeopardy, Michelsen was sacked in August 2023.

== Personal life ==
His brother Christopher Michelsen was also a footballer.

== Honours ==
Individual

- Eliteserien Coach of the Month: May 2021
