= Kjetil Knutsen =

Norwegian football manager (born 1968)

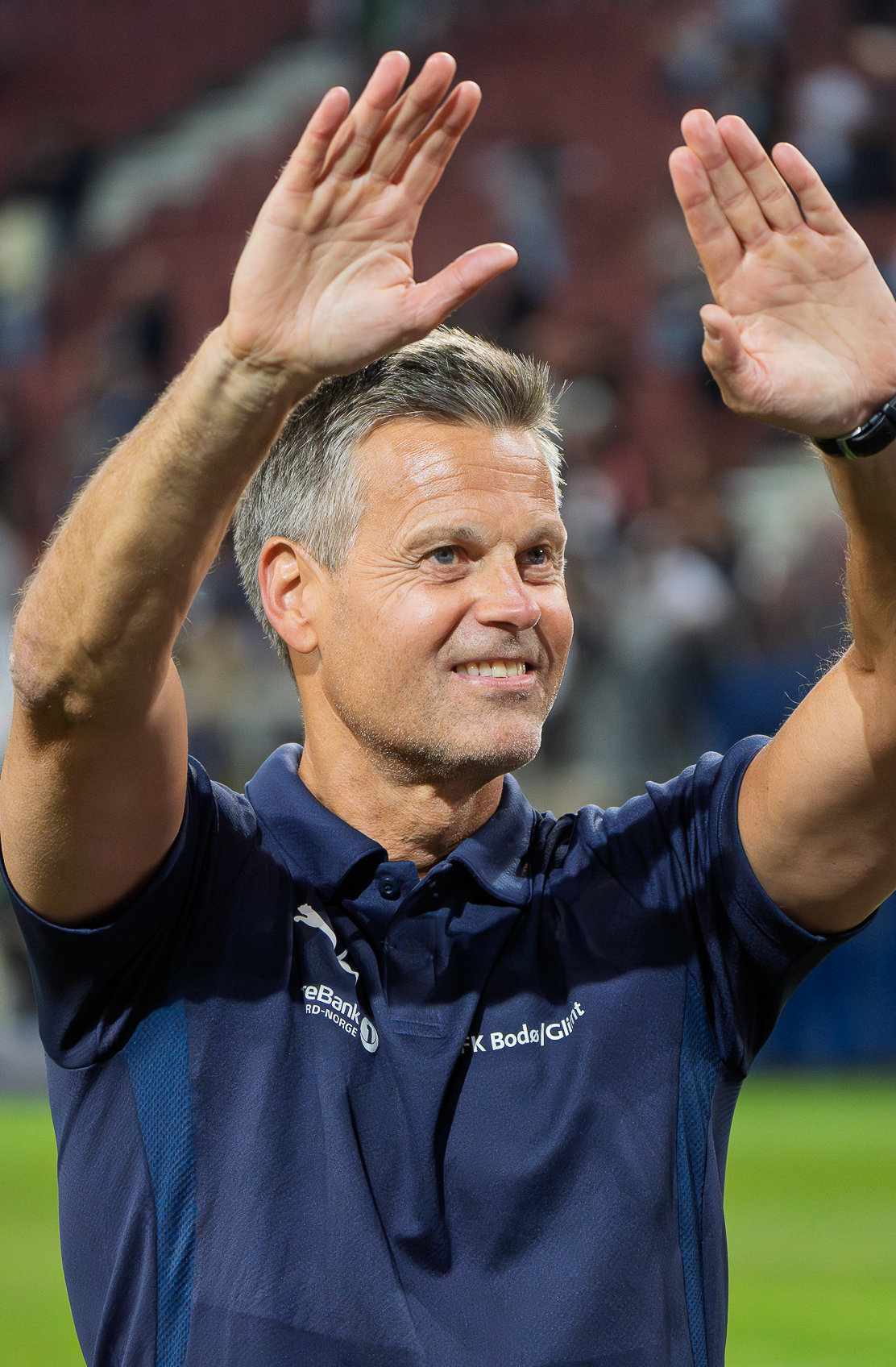
- Knutsen in 2025

Personal information
- Date of birth: 2 October 1967 (age 59)
- Place of birth: Arna, Bergen, Norway

Team information
- Current team: Bodø/Glimt (manager)

Youth career
- Years: Team
- Brann

Managerial career
- 1995–2004: Hovding
- 2009–2013: Fyllingsdalen
- 2014–2016: Åsane
- 2018–: Bodø/Glimt

Kjetil Knutsen (born 2 October 1968) is a Norwegian football coach who is the current manager of Eliteserien club Bodø/Glimt. He has won four national league titles with the club, leading them to their first ever league title in 2020, and been awarded the Eliteserien Coach of the Year three years in a row. Knutsen led Bodø/Glimt to their debut in the group stage of a major European tournament during the 2021–22 UEFA Europa Conference League and the semi-finals of the 2024–25 UEFA Europa League, where they became the first Norwegian team to reach the semi-finals of a major European competition.

== Career ==
Knutsen started his manager career at fifth-tier club TIL Hovding in 1995, initially as a junior coach, then as head coach. Knutsen would take the team up two divisions in nine years before leaving for a role at top-tier side Brann as head of first-team development. He was hired as head coach at Fyllingsdalen in 2012 and then at Åsane in 2014. After Knutsen was sacked from his position as head coach in Åsane, he joined Bodø/Glimt as assistant coach under head coach Aasmund Bjørkan.

In 2018, Knutsen became head coach for Bodø/Glimt after Bjørkan moved to the role of sports director. The team finished the 2019 Eliteserien in second place, and Knutsen received the Eliteserien Coach of the Year award for this accomplishment. In 2020, Knutsen led Bodø/Glimt to their first ever Norwegian national league title in a record-breaking season where they lost only one game, and he was again awarded Coach of the Year. In 2021, the team won their second Eliteserien title, and Knutsen was awarded Coach of the Year for a third consecutive time. That same season, Knutsen led Bodø/Glimt to the group stage of the UEFA Conference League, the club's debut in the group stage of a European tournament, where his outfit became the first team in history to score six times against a José Mourinho side in a 6–1 victory against Roma at Aspmyra. The team reached the quarter-finals before being knocked out by future champions Roma 5–2 on aggregate.

In 2022, Bodø/Glimt placed second in the league and reached the play-off round of the 2022–23 UEFA Champions League, where they lost to Dinamo Zagreb 4–2 on aggregate. The team competed in the group stage of the 2022–23 UEFA Europa League, finishing third in their group, and was later knocked out of the Conference League by Lech Poznań in the knockout round play-offs 1–0 on aggregate. Knutsen led Bodø/Glimt to a third national league title in 2023 and the knockout round play-offs of the Conference League, where they lost to Ajax 4–3 on aggregate.

Bodø/Glimt claimed a fourth league title in 2024 and reached the play-off round of the 2024–25 Champions League, where they lost to Red Star Belgrade 3–2 on aggregate. The team qualified for the 2024–25 Europa League knockout phase after finishing ninth in the league phase. Knutsen led Bodø/Glimt to the Europa League semi-finals after beating Lazio 2–3 in a penalty shoot-out, following a 3–3 draw on aggregate, becoming the first Norwegian team to reach the semi-finals of a major European competition.

== Managerial statistics ==
As of match played 20 November 2026

Team	From	To	Record				
Team	From	To	G	W	D	L	Win %
Fyllingsdalen	28 August 2009	15 October 2013	93	58	12	23	62.37
Åsane	1 January 2014	31 December 2016	95	40	24	31	42.11
Bodø/Glimt	1 January 2018	Present	404	245	79	80	60.64
Total			592	343	115	134	57.94

== Honours ==
Bodø/Glimt

- Eliteserien: 2020, 2021, 2023, 2024
- Norwegian Cup: 2025–26

Individual

- Eliteserien Coach of the Year: 2019, 2020, 2021
- Eliteserien Coach of the Month: October 2021, May 2023, April 2024
- Kniksen's honour award: 2024
