= Pål Arne Johansen =

Norwegian footballer and manager (born 1977)

Personal information
- Date of birth: 16 February 1977 (age 49)
- Height: 1.79 m (5 ft 10 in)
- Position: Midfielder

Team information
- Current team: Asteras Tripolis (assistant)

Youth career
- Sport-71
- –1993: Brønnøysund
- 1994: Bærum

Senior career*
Years	Team	Apps	(Gls)
1993	Brønnøysund		
1995–1997	Fossum		
1998−2000	Lyn	27	(2)
2001	Ull/Kisa		
2002	Bærum		
2003–2006	Groruddalen		

Managerial career
- 2003: Groruddalen (player-manager)
- 2016–2022: Norway U18 + U19 + U20
- 2022–2023: Odd
- 2023–2024: Häcken
- * Club domestic league appearances and goals

Pål Arne Johansen (born 16 February 1977) is a Norwegian professional football manager and former player who played as a midfielder. He is currently the assistant coach of Super League Greece club Asteras Tripolis.

== Career ==
Johansen hails from Brønnøy Municipality where he played youth football for Sport-71 and Brønnøysund, and made his senior debut for Brønnøy in 1993. Ahead of the 1994 season, he moved south to attend the Norwegian School of Elite Sport and play youth football for Bærum. His first senior team in Southeast Norway was Fossum, joining 1. divisjon team Lyn in 1998. After barely featuring in their promotion season of 2000, he went on to Ull/Kisa. In 2002, he joined Bærum, but after one season he pursued a coaching career, starting as player-manager of Groruddalen. He also immersed himself in theoretical football studies at the Norwegian School of Sport Sciences, co-writing the book Ferdighetsutvikling i fotball in 2002. Johansen was a player developer in Lyn, and in late 2005, when Lyn contested the 2005–06 Royal League, Johansen was acting assistant manager under Henning Berg. Johansen however resigned because of the values espoused by Lyn's directors.

Following his club exploits, Johansen was hired by the Football Association of Norway in 2006, first as assistant coach of the Norway women's national football team. Already after his first season he was named Young Manager of the Year by the football managers' association. He left the Norwegian women's national team after the 2009 UEFA Women's European Championship. He was the assistant manager of Hønefoss in the 2011 and 2012 seasons, and assistant manager of Legia Warsaw (again under Henning Berg) from July 2014 to October 2015. Ahead of the 2017 season he succeeded Eirik Horneland as head coach of Norway U18 and U19. He led Norway to the 2018 UEFA European Under-19 Championship (for the first time since 2005) and the 2019 FIFA U-20 World Cup (for the first time since 1993). On 24 January 2022, he was appointed head coach of Eliteserien club Odd.
