= Sparebanken Øst =

Bank based in Drammen, Norway

- Company type: Allmennaksjeselskap
- Traded as: OSE: SPOG
- Industry: Financial services
- Founded: 1843
- Headquarters: Drammen, Norway
- Area served: Eastern Norway
- Website: www.oest.no

Sparebanken Øst is a Norwegian savings bank, headquartered in Drammen, Norway. The banks main market is the eastern part of Norway. The bank was established in 1843.
