= Tor Ole Skullerud =

Norwegian footballer and manager (born 1970)

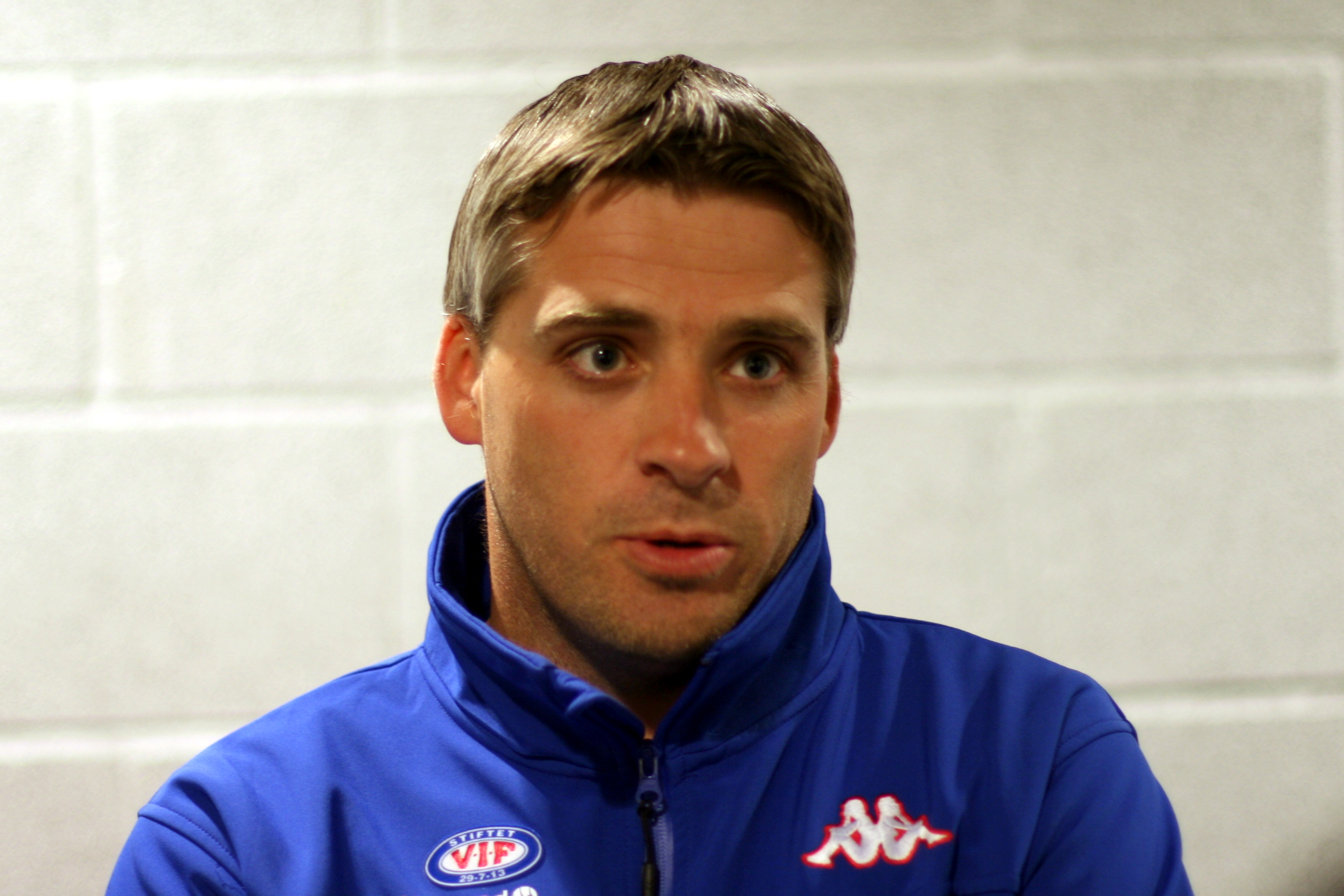

Personal information
- Date of birth: 10 December 1970 (age 55)
- Place of birth: Kongsvinger, Norway

Senior career*
Years	Team	Apps	(Gls)
- Kongsvinger
- Ready
- Frigg
- Grue
- Ullern

Managerial career
- 2005–2007: Norway U-18/U-19
- 2008–2009: Vålerenga (assistant manager)
- 2010: Norway U21 (assistant manager)
- 2010: Norway U21 (caretaker manager)
- 2010–2013: Norway U21 (assistant manager)
- 2013: Norway U21
- 2014–2015: Molde
- 2016–2018: Strømsgodset
- * Club domestic league appearances and goals

Tor Ole Skullerud (born 10 December 1970) is a Norwegian football manager and former player.

== Club career ==
Skullerud was born Kongsvinger, Norway. He played for hometown club of the same name, before turning out for Ready, Frigg, Grue and Ullern.

== Managerial career ==
=== Early career ===
Skullerud worked as a coach at Ullern and Bærum before taking over Norway's U-18 and U-19 teams. He was then appointed as assistant manager for Vålerenga, working under playing manager Martin Andresen.

=== Norway national youth teams ===
After being Per Joar Hansen's assistant in the under-21s, he took over as head coach in January 2013 after Hansen was appointed the new manager of Rosenborg.

He led Norway to the UEFA European Under-21 Championship in Israel. Norway was one of eight participating teams and finished second in their round with five points after a draw against the host nation Israel, a win against England and a draw with Italy. In the knockout phase, they faced eventual winners Spain, losing 3–0.

Skullerud was also briefly assistant coach under Per Mathias Høgmo with the men's national team. Skullerud is also a UEFA Prolis which is the highest education of coaches in Norway.

=== Molde ===
On 13 January 2014, he was presented as Ole Gunnar Solskjær's successor as head coach of Molde. His first season with Molde was an instant success, winning the double as winners of both the league title and the Norwegian Cup, the club's first ever double. Molde won the league with an eleven-point gap down to main rivals Rosenborg, and their 71 points was a new record for most points in the league. On 1 July 2015, Molde announced that Skullerud had decided not to continue as head coach at Molde after the 2015 season due to family reasons. After a run of mediocre results, culminating with Molde being eliminated by Dinamo Zagreb in the third qualifying round for the 2015–16 UEFA Champions League on 4 August, Skullerud was sacked on 6 August 2015.

== Managerial statistics ==
As of 7 June 2018

Team	Period	Record						
Team	Period	G	W	D	L	GF	GA	Win %
Molde	13 January 2014 – 6 August 2015	65	42	12	11	146	56	64.62
Strømsgodset	18 October 2016 – 6 June 2018	52	24	12	16	76	61	46.15

== Honours ==
=== Manager ===
Molde

- Eliteserien: 2014
- Norwegian Cup: 2014

=== Individual ===
- Eliteserien Manager of the Year: 2014
