= Haugaland Kraft =

Norwegian energy company

Haugaland Kraft AS
- Type: Municipal owned
- Industry: Power
- Founded: 1998
- Headquarters: Haugesund, Norway
- Area served: Haugaland and Sunnhordland
- Products: Electricity; Broadband
- Owner: 7 municipalities
- Website: www.hkraft.no

Haugaland Kraft is a Norwegian power company formed in 1998 as a merger between Haugesund Energi and Karmsund Kraftlag.

Haugaland Kraft is owned by the municipalities of Karmøy, Haugesund, Tysvær, Vindafjord, Bokn, Sveio, and Utsira.

The company produces and distributes electric power (mainly hydroelectricity) to customers. In recent years, the company has been exploring possibilities of building wind power stations, but it has proven to be difficult to get concession from local authorities for such plans. The company also offers broadband services.

The head office is located in Haugesund.
