= Dag-Eilev Fagermo =

Norwegian football coach (born 1967)

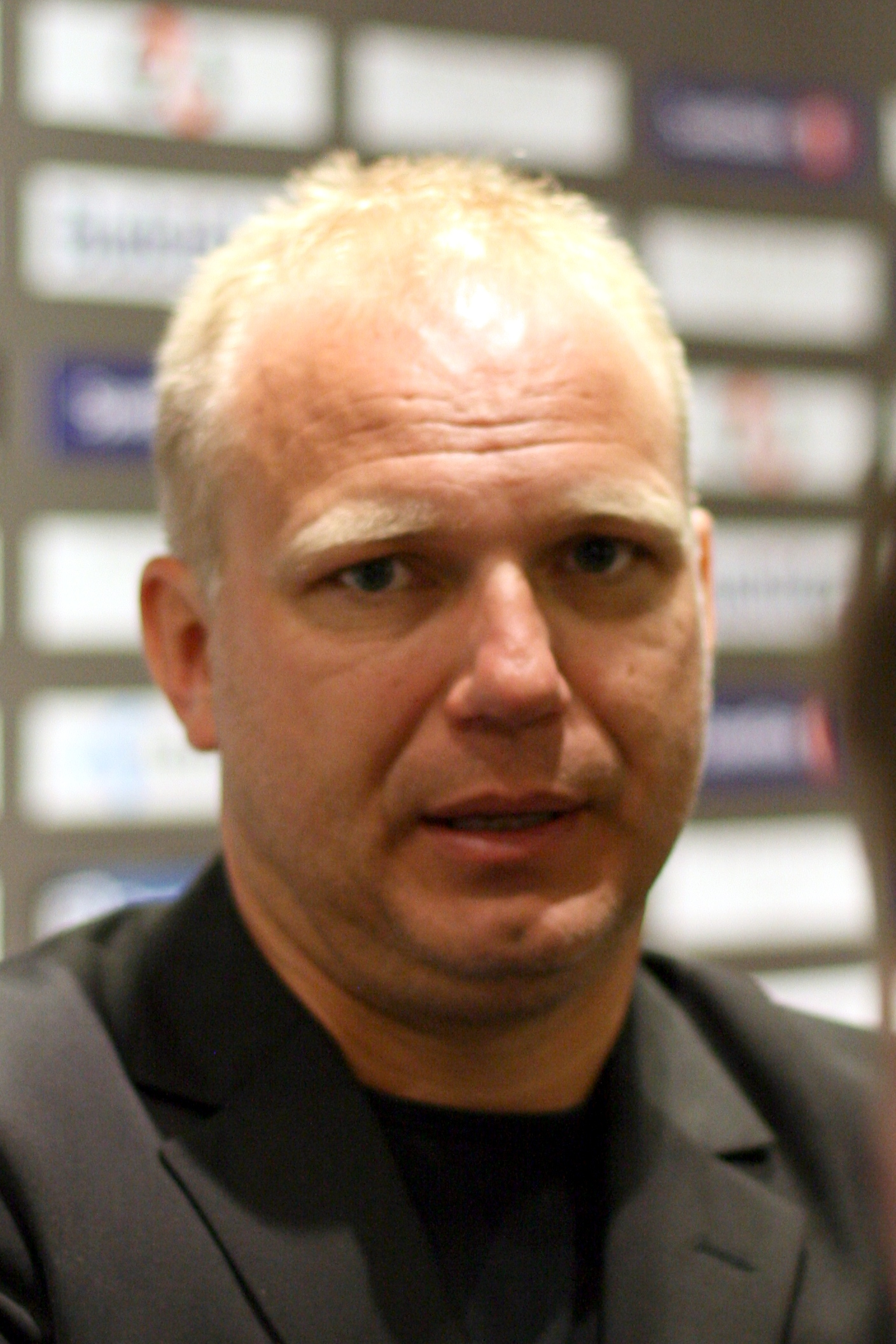

Personal information
- Full name: Dag-Eilev Akerhaugen Fagermo
- Date of birth: 28 January 1967 (age 59)
- Place of birth: Bærum, Norway

Team information
- Current team: Notodden (managing director)

Senior career*
Years	Team	Apps	(Gls)
- Raufoss
- Kjapp
- Snøgg

Managerial career
- 1995–2002: Skarphedin
- 2002–2004: Pors Grenland
- 2004–2005: Notodden
- 2006–2007: Strømsgodset
- 2007–2020: Odd
- 2020–2023: Vålerenga
- 2024: Lillestrøm
- 2025–2026: Strømsgodset
- 2026–: Notodden (managing director)
- * Club domestic league appearances and goals

Dag-Eilev Akerhaugen Fagermo (born 28 January 1967) is a Norwegian football coach.

== Coaching career ==
=== Early career ===
Fagermo was born in Bærum, and grew up in Raufoss, Norway. He started his coaching career in lower leagues with his first job as head coach being at Skarphedin in 1995. He took over Pors Grenland in 2002 and moved on to Notodden in 2004. Fagermo became head coach of second tier club Strømsgodset ahead of the 2006 season. Strømsgodset promoted to the top flight in Fagermo's first season in charge and finished in eleventh position in their first season back in the top flight in 2007.

=== Odd ===
Ahead of the 2008 season, he became head coach at Odd Grenland. Under Fagermo's management, Odd finished in third position in the 2014 Tippeligaen. This was Odd's first top flight medal since the 1956–57 season. Odd also finished in bronze medal position in 2016. In 2019, his last season at the club, Odd finished in fourth position dropping from third place in the final round of the season. Since Fagermo's appointment as head coach of Odd on 17 December 2007, he coached the team in twelve consecutive seasons.

=== Vålerenga ===
On 31 January 2020, Fagermo was announced as head coach of Vålerenga, replacing Ronny Deila.

After two-and-a-half seasons at Vålerenga, Fagermo was fired after a loss to his former club Strømsgodset.

=== Lillestrøm ===
In September 2024 Fagermo signed on as head coach for Lillestrøm after the club sacked David Nielsen after only a month at the club. The contract lasted only until the end of the year, and after the club was relegated, it was not renewed.

Fagermo would later go on to say that he regretted taking the job, citing that there wasn't enough time to change what he needed to keep the club in the top flight.

=== Return to Strømsgodset ===
On 10 June 2025 Fagermo was announced as the new head coach for Strømsgodset, signing a two-and-a-half year contract. The contract would see Fagermo return to the club after eighteen years. Only half a year after being appointed, and after not being able to save Strømsgodset from relegation, Fagermo was sacked by the club.

Following the sacking, Fagermo announced his retirement from being a football manager. Instead, he became part-time managing director of Second Division club Notodden FK.

== Managerial statistics ==
As of match played 30 November 2025

Managerial record by team and tenure
Team	From	To	Record				
Team	From	To	P	W	D	L	Win %
Strømsgodset	11 November 2005	15 December 2007	64	34	11	19	53.13
Odd	17 December 2007	30 January 2020	438	223	91	124	50.91
Vålerenga	31 January 2020	12 June 2023	110	50	28	32	45.45
Lillestrøm	30 September 2024	10 December 2024	7	1	0	6	14.29
Strømsgodset	10 June 2025	19 January 2026	22	4	3	15	18.18
Total			641	312	133	196	48.67

== Honours ==
Strømsgodset

- 1. divisjon: 2006

Individual

- Eliteserien Coach of the Month: July 2022
