= Sparebanken Møre =

Norwegian savings bank

- Company type: Savings bank
- Traded as: OSE: MORG
- Industry: Financial services
- Founded: 1985
- Headquarters: Ålesund, Norway
- Area served: Møre og Romsdal
- Number of employees: 459 (2026)
- Website: www.sbm.no

Sparebanken Møre is a Norwegian savings bank, headquartered in Ålesund, Norway. The banks main market is Møre og Romsdal. The bank was established when several savings banks in Møre og Romsdal merged.

The following savings banks joined the merger in 1985:

- Herøy og Leikong Sparebank (founded 1843)
- Stranda Sparebank (1848)
- Skodje og Vatne Sparebank (1861)
- Vanylven og Syvde Sparebank (1861)
- Vestnes Sparebank stiftet (1861)
- Sykkylven Sparebank (1862)
- Sunnylven Sparebank (1865)
- Geiranger Sparebank (1866)
- Haram Sparebank (1868)
- Norddal Sparebank (1870)
- Borgund Sparebank (1880)
- Stordal Sparebank (1897)
- Sande og Rovde Sparebank (1898)
- Vigra Sparebank (1912)
- Aalesunds Sparebank (1910)
- Aalesunds Håndverkeres Sparebank (1926)
- Aaheim Sparebank (1926)
- Hareid Sparebank (1927)
- Ulstein Sparebank (1927)
- Voll Sparebank (1928)
