= Bjørn Petter Ingebretsen =

Norwegian football coach (born 1967)

Personal information
- Full name: Bjørn Petter Ingebretsen
- Date of birth: 26 May 1967 (age 59)
- Place of birth: Flisa, Norway

Team information
- Current team: Mjøndalen (director of sports)

Managerial career
- Years: Team
- 2009–2013: Strømsgodset (assistant)
- 2015–2016: Strømsgodset
- 2016–2017: Strømsgodset (assistant)
- 2017: Fredrikstad (interim)
- 2018–2019: Strømsgodset
- 2021–2022: Strømsgodset
- 2023–: Mjøndalen (director of sports)

Bjørn Petter Ingebretsen (born 26 May 1967) is a Norwegian football coach who is the current director of sports of Mjøndalen. His latest position as head coach was for Eliteserien club Strømsgodset.

== Playing career ==
Ingebretsen was born in Flisa, Norway, and played youth football for Grue IL, alongside Ståle Solbakken. The two teens also had a short training spell with Arsenal in 1986. Solbakken described him as a «very good player», but many injuries and lack of speed put an end to the dream of a career as a professional player. Ingebretsen still played over 300 senior matches for Grue at an amateur level.^{[4]}

== Managing career ==
Ingebretsen began his coaching career in the early 2000s as a youth coach for the regional football administration in Buskerud, before he took the job as a player developer and youth coach at NTG / Lyn. In 2005, he was signed by Strømsgodset Toppfotball to head their youth development program.

During Ronny Deila's successful managing spell at the club from 2007 to 2014, Ingebretsen served as assistant coach from 2009 until the end of 2013. Ingebretsen started studying for his UEFA Pro license in October 2014.

On 26 May 2015, Ingebretsen took the job as interim manager for Strømsgodset, after David Nielsen ended his spell on a mutual agreement. Under his management, Strømsgodset won five of the first six league matches, and advanced from the first two qualifications rounds in the 2015–16 UEFA Europa League. After the good start, the team struggled more in the league and was eliminated from the Europa League. Nevertheless, on 18 August 2015, Ingebretsen signed a contract lasting until the end of the 2018 season and became the permanent manager instead of being the interim manager.

On 13 October 2016, Ingebretsen resigned from the managing position at Strømsgodset due to health problems. He remained in the club with a flexible role and returned as assistant manager in 2017.

On 29 October 2017, Ingebretsen was "loaned" out to Fredrikstad FK with his colleague from Strømsgodset, Alexander Straus, where Ingebretsen became the manager. His job was to save the club from relegation. Ingebretsen failed to save the club, and Fredrikstad was relegated from the 1. divisjon. After the spell af Fredrikstad, he returned to his work at Strømsgodset as a scout. Ingebretsen took over Strømsgodset again on 7 June 2018 after Tor Ole Skullerud resigned on 6 June 2018. He was initially signed on an interim basis, but was announced as permanent head coach on 30 July 2018. On 15 May 2019, Ingebretsen resigned from his position as head coach at Strømsgodset due to health problems.

== Personal life ==
Ingebretsen is married to Åse Kortgaard, with whom he has two children. His son, Bjarne Kortgaard Ingebretsen, is a football player and assistant coach at Mjøndalen IF, and his daughter Marte has also played football.

Outside of football, Bjørn Petter Ingebretsen has worked as a prison guard.

== Managerial statistics ==
As of 2 December 2018

Team	Nat	From	To	Record							
Team	Nat	From	To	G	W	D	L	GF	GA	GD	Win %
Strømsgodset	Norway	27 May 2015	13 October 2016	46	25	9	12	93	67	+26	54.35
Strømsgodset	Norway	30 July 2018	15 May 2019	22	5	8	9	39	35	+4	22.73
Total				68	30	17	21	132	102	+30	44.12

== Honours ==
Individual

- Eliteserien Coach of the Month: May 2022
