= SpareBank 1 Nord-Norge =

Norwegian savings bank

- Company type: Savings bank
- Industry: Banking
- Founded: 1836
- Headquarters: Tromsø, Norway
- Area served: Northern Norway
- Key people: Hans Olav Karde (CEO)
- Revenue: ▲NOK 1,666 million (2005)
- Operating income: NOK 794 million (2005)
- Net income: NOK 557 million (2005)
- Number of employees: 839 (2006)
- Website: www.snn.no

SpareBank 1 Nord-Norge is a Norwegian savings bank. The bank has 90 branch offices in Nordland, Tromsø, Finnmark and Svalbard and a head office in Tromsø. It has 250,000 private and 40,000 institutional customers with total assets of NOK 48 billion. It is a founding member of the bank alliance SpareBank 1, with a 19.5% ownership.

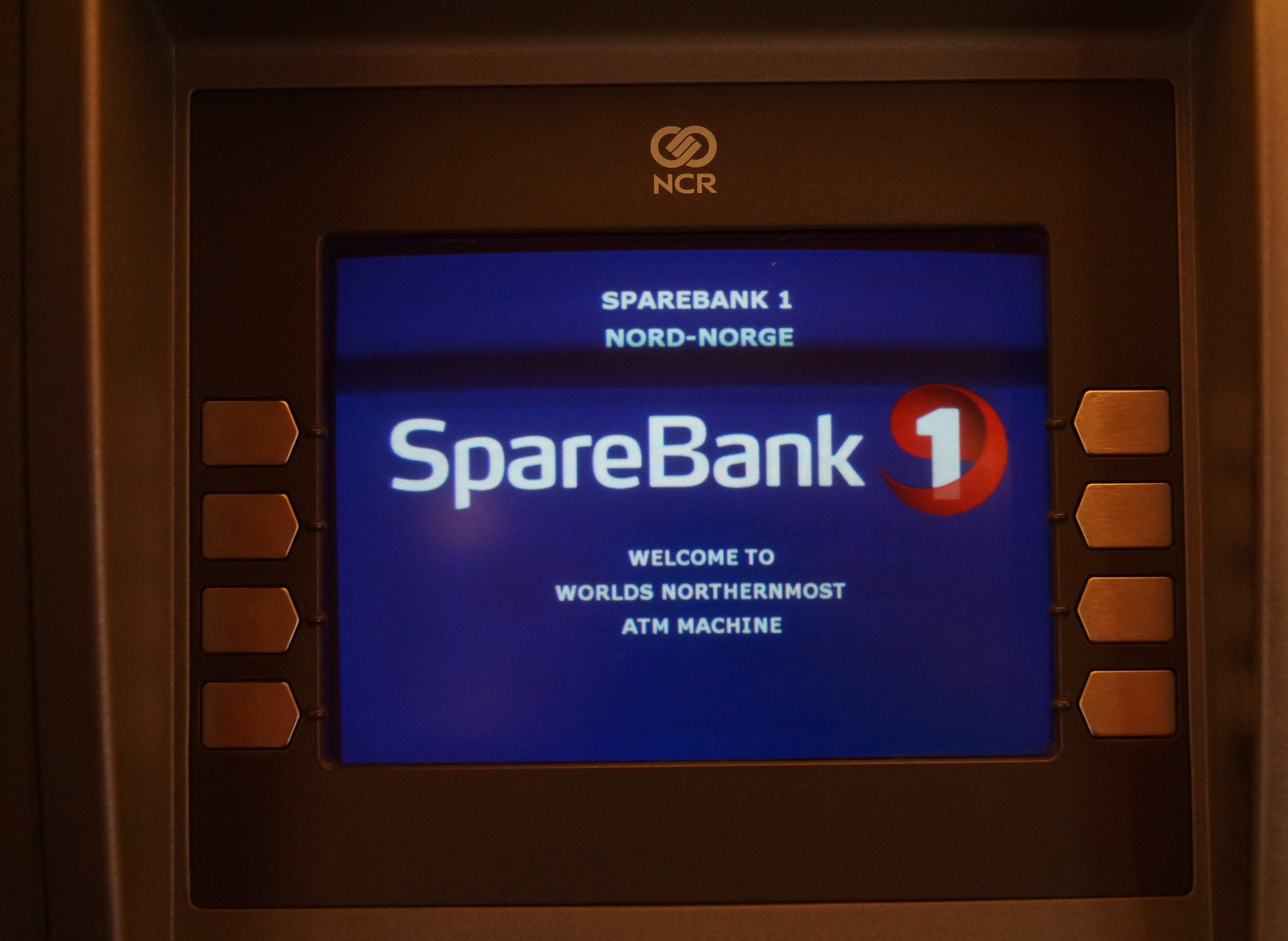
A SpareBank 1 Nord-Norge ATM, at the bank's Longyearbyen branch.

== History ==
The first of the many savings banks that now is part of Sparebanken Nord-Norge was Tromsø Sparebank, founded in 1836. After that, especially in the mid-19th century many savings banks were established in Northern Norway.

In the 1960s and onwards to the 1980s there was a trend of merging local savings banks to larger unites. Tromsø Sparebank merged with nine other banks in Troms and Finnmark to form a large Tromsø Sparebank in the period 1963-1984 while another savings bank, Sparebanken Nord, arose consisting of a merger between ten other banks in the same counties. In Nordland the bank Sparebanken Nordland emerged in 1985 after the merge of 14 local savings banks.

In 1988 Norway was struck by a bank crisis, and this forced Tromsø Sparebank and Sparebanken Nord to merge to form Sparebanken Nord-Norge. In 1991 Nordkapp Sparebank and in 1992 Sparebanken Nordland also joined.

In December 2018, the bank gained international attention when a man tried to steal NOK 70 000 from the Longyearbyen branch, the world most northerly bank making it the northernmost bank robbery.
