= Jostein Grindhaug =

Norwegian footballer and manager (born 1973)

Personal information
- Date of birth: 20 February 1973 (age 53)
- Place of birth: Åkrehamn, Norway
- Height: 1.81 m (5 ft 11 in)
- Position: Midfielder

Senior career*
Years	Team	Apps	(Gls)
- Åkra IL
1990–1993	Djerv 1919		
1994–1999	Haugesund		
2000	SK Nord		
2001–2007	Haugesund	135	(29)

Managerial career
- 2008: Åkra IL (coach)
- 2009–2015: Haugesund
- 2015–2019: Haugesund (Director of Football)
- 2019–2023: Haugesund
- 2025–: Haugesund (Director of Football)
- * Club domestic league appearances and goals

Jostein Grindhaug (born 20 February 1973) is a Norwegian football coach and former player. Hailing from Åkrehamn, he spent most of his active career with FK Haugesund.

== Playing career ==
He started his career in Åkra IL, and was signed by then-second tier club Djerv 1919 in 1990. Djerv 1919 were relegated in 1993, Grindhaug crucially missing a penalty kick in the last match of the season. Djerv 1919 then merged to form the new team FK Haugesund. Grindhaug had the honor of scoring the first league goal for the new club, and the club eventually found its way to the Norwegian Premier League, making its debut season in 1997.

Grindhaug played regularly until the summer of 1998, when his career was halted due to knee injuries. Following five operations, he returned to football in the winter of 1999–2000. He trialled at several clubs, turning down a contract offer from Beijing Guo'an before injuring himself in a trial match for Umeå FC. His comeback to football, thus, came on the third tier of Norwegian football for SK Nord. However, he managed to reclaim a spot in the FK Haugesund squad. He remained there until 1 November 2007, albeit struggling with injuries since February 2006. In total he scored 45 goals in 220 appearances for FK Haugesund over two periods; only Arild Andersen has more appearances for the relatively young club.

== Coaching career ==
Ahead of the 2009 season, Grindhaug was hired as the new head coach of FK Haugesund, replacing Rune Skarsfjord who left to become assistant coach in SK Brann. Grindhaug had at that time been a caretaker assistant coach for two weeks.

One month before signing Grindhaug, FK Haugesund had looked to hire Conny Karlsson; Other candidates were Roar Hansen, Jonas Wirmola and Kjetil Knutsen. Grindhaug, on the other hand, had worked in a coaching capacity at Åkra IL in 2008, however this contract was annulled due to a clause in which Grindhaug could leave for a bigger club. Grindhaug had formerly turned down an offer to be assistant coach of FK Haugesund in 2005. On 21 September, Grindhaug was demoted to backroomstaff for Haugesund and his assistant Mark Dempsey took over as manager. On 24 January 2019 Grindhaug became manager for Haugesund again, after former coach Eirik Horneland went to Rosenborg.

== Personal life ==
Jostein Grindhaug is married and has two children; one son and one daughter. They reside in Åkrehamn. Grindhaug is a supporter of Portsmouth F.C.
