= 2025 Eliteserien =

81st season of top-tier football league in Norway

Eliteserien
- Season: 2025
- Dates: 29 March – 30 November
- Champions: Viking (9th title)
- Relegated: Bryne; Strømsgodset; Haugesund
- Champions League: Viking; Bodø/Glimt
- Europa League: Tromsø
- Conference League: Brann
- Matches: 240
- Goals: 762 (3.18 per match)
- Best player: Patrick Berg
- Top goalscorer: Daniel Karlsbakk (18 goals)
- Best goalkeeper: Nikita Haikin (13 clean sheets)
- Biggest home win: Sandefjord 6–0 Kristiansund (20 July 2025); Bodø/Glimt 7–1 Kristiansund (12 September 2025) Rosenborg 6-0 Strømsgodset (30 November 2025)
- Biggest away win: Haugesund 0–5 Strømsgodset (6 April 2025); Kristiansund 0–5 KFUM (26 July 2025); Strømsgodset 0–5 Bodø/Glimt (15 August 2025)
- Highest scoring: Bodø/Glimt 7–2 Vålerenga (26 July 2025)
- Longest winning run: 9 matches Tromsø
- Longest unbeaten run: 16 matches Viking
- Longest winless run: 17 matches Haugesund
- Longest losing run: 11 matches Strømsgodset
- Highest attendance: 21,263; Rosenborg - Molde (27 April 2025)
- Lowest attendance: 0 (Note: Vålerenga's home game against Bryne was played without spectators due to fireworks use in the stands in a previous game.); Vålerenga - Bryne (30 August 2025)
- Total attendance: 1,709,895
- Average attendance: 7,123

The 2025 Eliteserien was the 81st season of top-tier football in Norway. This was the ninth season of Eliteserien after rebranding from Tippeligaen.

The season started on 29 March 2025 and ended on 30 November 2025, not including play-off matches.

Bodø/Glimt were the defending champions. Vålerenga and Bryne joined as the promoted clubs from the 2024 Norwegian First Division. They replaced Lillestrøm and Odd, who were relegated to the 2025 Norwegian First Division.

Viking won a closely contested championship title by a single point on the last day of the season, earning their 9th overall title, fending off the defending champions Bodø/Glimt. Viking's last title had come 34 years earlier in 1991. With the win, Viking earned an entry to the 2026–27 Champions League play-off round.

== Teams ==
Sixteen teams competed in the league – the top fourteen teams from the previous season and two teams promoted from the First Division. The promoted teams were Vålerenga and Bryne, who were promoted after respectively 1 and 21 seasons absent. They replaced Lillestrøm and Odd, ending their top flight spells of 4 and 16 years respectively.

=== Stadiums and locations ===
Locations of the teams in the 2025 Eliteserien
Locations of the teams in the 2025 Eliteserien in Oslo

Note: Table lists in alphabetical order.

Team	Ap.	Location	County	Arena	Turf	Capacity
Bodø/Glimt	30	Bodø	Nordland	Aspmyra Stadion	Artificial	8,200
Brann	67	Bergen	Vestland	Brann Stadion	Natural	17,500
Bryne	18	Bryne	Rogaland	Bryne Stadion	Natural	5,000
Fredrikstad	44	Fredrikstad	Østfold	Fredrikstad Stadion	Artificial	12,560
HamKam	26	Hamar	Innlandet	Briskeby Stadion	Artificial	8,068
Haugesund	19	Haugesund	Rogaland	Haugesund Sparebank Arena	Natural	8,983
KFUM Oslo	2	Oslo	Oslo	KFUM Arena	Artificial	3,300
Kristiansund	8	Kristiansund	Møre og Romsdal	Nordmøre Stadion	Artificial	4,364
Molde	49	Molde	Møre og Romsdal	Aker Stadion	Artificial	11,249
Rosenborg	62	Trondheim	Trøndelag	Lerkendal Stadion	Natural	21,423
Sandefjord	13	Sandefjord	Vestfold	Jotun Arena	Artificial	6,582
Sarpsborg 08	14	Sarpsborg	Østfold	Sarpsborg Stadion	Artificial	8,022
Strømsgodset	38	Drammen	Buskerud	Marienlyst Stadion	Artificial	8,935
Tromsø	37	Tromsø	Troms	Romssa Arena	Artificial	6,691
Viking	75	Stavanger	Rogaland	Lyse Arena	Artificial	15,900
Vålerenga	64	Oslo	Oslo	Intility Arena	Artificial	16,556

=== Personnel and kits ===
Team	Manager(s)	Captain	Kit manufacturer	Kit sponsors	
Team	Manager(s)	Captain	Kit manufacturer	Main	Other(s)
Bodø/Glimt	(Norway) Kjetil Knutsen	(Norway) Patrick Berg (Note: Bodø/Glimt play with a captaincy team who decide between themselves who will be the captain on a game-by-game basis, Patrick Berg is the most common choice. The full team consists of Ulrik Saltnes, Jostein Gundersen, Sondre Sørli, Patrick Berg, Sondre Brunstad Fet, Jens Petter Hauge and Brede Moe.)	Puma	SpareBank 1 Nord-Norge	List: Front: Action Now, Elkem; Back: The Quartz Corp, MOT; Sleeves: Bodø Energi / Elkem (in UEFA matches); Shorts: Leonhard Nilsen & Sønner, LæreriNord; Socks: Coop Norge
Brann	(Iceland) Freyr Alexandersson	(Norway) Fredrik Pallesen Knudsen	Nike	Sparebanken Norge	List: Front: Eviny, BOB BBL; Back: FotMob, MOT; Sleeves: REMA 1000; Shorts: Lerøy, EGD Holding; Socks: Tide
Bryne	(Norway) Kevin Knappen	(Norway) Eirik Saunes	Umbro	Sparebanken Norge	List: Front: Aarbakke, M44; Back: NYO3, Like Muligheter; Sleeves: Prosjektil; Shorts: Masiv, ECS; Socks: Servit
Fredrikstad	(Norway) Andreas Hagen	(Ghana) Leonard Owusu	Craft	OBOS	List: Front: Terje Høili, Stene Stål Gjenvinning; Back: Europris; Sleeves: Værste AS; Shorts: Unger Fabrikker, McDonald's; Socks: Toyota Østfold
HamKam	(Norway) Thomas Myhre	(Norway) Fredrik Sjølstad	Puma	OBOS	List: Front: CC Hamar, Eidsiva Energi; Back: SpareBank 1 Østlandet; Sleeves: Pepsi; Shorts: Norsk Tipping, AJ Produkter; Socks: None
Haugesund	(Finland) Toni Korkeakunnas	(Cape Verde) Bruno Leite (Note: Haugesund play with a captaincy team where the captain is decided on a game-by-game basis, Bruno Leite is the most common choice. The full team consists of Julius Eskesen, Amund Wichne, Parfait Bizoza, Morten Konradsen, Bruno Leite and Oscar Krusnell.)	Umbro	Haugaland Kraft	List: Front: DeepOcean, Haugesund Sparebank; Back: AutoStore System, Mær enn tri poeng; Sleeves: Wee.no; Shorts: PURO Hotels, Coop Norge; Socks: Volkswagen
KFUM	(Norway) Johannes Moesgaard	(Norway) Robin Rasch	Hummel	OBOS	List: Front: Kiwi Minipris; Back: Arctic Asset Management; Sleeves: Intility; Shorts: Nord West Eiendom, R Utemiljø; Socks: Nettavisen
Kristiansund	(Norway) Amund Skiri	(Norway) Dan Peter Ulvestad	Puma	SpareBank 1 Nordmøre	List: Front: Coop Norge, Lerøy; Back: Slatlem, MOT; Sleeves: FG Eiendom; Shorts: Olivita Kapsler, Alti Storkaia; Socks: Nordmøre Energiverk
Molde	(Norway) Magne Hoseth (Norway) Daniel Berg Hestad (caretakers)	(Norway) Magnus Wolff Eikrem	Adidas	Sparebanken Møre	List: Front: Wenaas; Back: Brunvoll, MOT; Sleeves: Istad; Shorts: BDO Global; Socks: Stiftelsen VI
Rosenborg	(Sweden) Alfred Johansson	(Norway) Ole Selnæs	Adidas	SpareBank 1 SMN	List: Front: Scandic Hotels; Back: Coop Norge, MOT; Sleeves: SalMar; Shorts: Adresseavisen; Socks: Vintervoll
Sandefjord	(Sweden) Andreas Tegström	(Sweden) Filip Ottosson	Macron	Jotun	List: Front: SpareBank 1 Sør-Norge, BDO Global; Back: Harmonie Norge, Fotballstiftelsen; Sleeves: iteam AS; Shorts: Color Line; Socks: None
Sarpsborg	(England) Martin Foyston	(Norway) Jo Inge Berget	Hummel	Borregaard	List: Front: Assist Consulting AS, Pretec Group; Back: Frigaard Gruppen, Lions Clubs International; Sleeves: Økonomi-deler; Shorts: DNB, Flexi Regnskap; Socks: None
Strømsgodset	(Norway) Dag-Eilev Fagermo	(Norway) Gustav Valsvik	Puma	Sparebanken Øst	List: Front: Kiwi Minipris, Å Energi; Back: H-vinduet Fjerdingstad, Blått hjerte; Sleeves: Quality Hotel River Station; Shorts: ARBO Entreprenør; Socks: None
Tromsø	(Norway) Jørgen Vik	(Norway) Ruben Yttergård Jenssen	Select	SpareBank 1 Nord-Norge	List: Front: Consto, Harila Bilforhandler; Back: Ishavskraft, MOT; Sleeves: Explo Energidrikk; Shorts: Extra (Coop), C&M Brannsikring; Socks: Kræmer
Viking	(Norway) Bjarte Lunde Aarsheim (Norway) Morten Jensen	(Norway) Zlatko Tripić	Diadora	Lyse	List: Front: OBOS, SpareBank 1 Sør-Norge; Back: Bouvet, Kraft og Kjærlighet; Sleeves: NiceMobil; Shorts: Coop Norge, BDO Global; Socks: Coop Norge
Vålerenga	(Norway) Geir Bakke	(Norway) Henrik Bjørdal	Adidas	OBOS	List: Front: Coop Norge, Eidsiva Energi; Back: Comfyballs, Vålerenga mot rasisme; Sleeves: Benchmark; Shorts: Coca-Cola, Hurtigruta Carglass; Socks: Nettavisen

=== Managerial changes ===
Team	Outgoing manager(s)	Manner of departure	Date of vacancy	Position in the table	Incoming manager(s)	Date of appointment
Molde	(Norway) Erling Moe	Sacked	8 December 2024	Pre-season	(Norway) Trond Strande (Norway) Eirik Mæland (caretakers)	8 December 2024
Sandefjord	(Norway) Hans Erik Ødegaard	Signed by Lillestrøm	10 December 2024	Pre-season	None (Note: Andreas Tegström was already co-manager and continued as the sole manager.)	10 December 2024
Brann	(Norway) Eirik Horneland	Resigned	10 December 2024	Pre-season	(Iceland) Freyr Alexandersson	13 January 2025
Tromsø	(Norway) Gard Holme	Mutual consent	8 January 2025	Pre-season	None (Note: Jørgen Vik was already co-manager and continued as the sole manager.)	8 January 2025
Molde	(Norway) Trond Strande (Norway) Eirik Mæland (caretakers)	End of caretaker period	9 January 2025	Pre-season	(Norway) Per-Mathias Høgmo	9 January 2025
Haugesund	(Denmark) Sancheev Manoharan	Mutual consent	26 May 2025	16th	(Finland) Toni Korkeakunnas	27 May 2025
Strømsgodset	(Norway) Jørgen Isnes	Mutual consent	26 May 2025	14th	(Norway) Børre Steenslid (Norway) Tomas Skaret Halvorsen (caretakers)	28 May 2025
Strømsgodset	(Norway) Børre Steenslid (Norway) Tomas Skaret Halvorsen (caretakers)	End of caretaker period	10 June 2025	14th	(Norway) Dag-Eilev Fagermo	10 June 2025
HamKam	(Denmark) Jakob Michelsen	Signed by Denmark women's national team	24 June 2025	13th	(Norway) Thomas Myhre	24 June 2025
Sarpsborg	(Norway) Christian Michelsen	Sacked	20 August 2025	11th	(Norway) Sander Nyland (caretaker)	20 August 2025
Molde	(Norway) Per-Mathias Høgmo	Mutual consent	14 September 2025	11th	(Norway) Magne Hoseth (Norway) Daniel Berg Hestad (caretakers)	14 September 2025
Sarpsborg	(Norway) Sander Nyland (caretaker)	End of caretaker period	25 September 2025	10th	(England) Martin Foyston	25 September 2025

== League table ==
Pos	Team	Pld	W	D	L	GF	GA	GD	Pts	Qualification or relegation
1	Viking (C)	30	22	5	3	77	36	+41	71	Qualification for the Champions League play-off round
2	Bodø/Glimt	30	22	4	4	85	28	+57	70	Qualification for the Champions League third qualifying round (Note: Bodø/Glimt, as one of the two clubs with the highest club coefficient that would otherwise have entered the League Path second qualifying round, entered the League Path third qualifying round due to the rebalancing of the default access list.)
3	Tromsø	30	18	3	9	50	36	+14	57	Qualification for the Europa League second qualifying round (Note: Lillestrøm from the 2025 Norwegian First Division qualified for the Europa League play-off round as winners of the 2025 Norwegian Football Cup.)
4	Brann	30	17	5	8	55	46	+9	56	Qualification for the Conference League second qualifying round
5	Sandefjord	30	15	3	12	55	42	+13	48	
6	Vålerenga	30	13	4	13	49	50	−1	43	
7	Rosenborg	30	11	9	10	45	42	+3	42	
8	Fredrikstad	30	11	9	10	38	35	+3	42	
9	Sarpsborg 08	30	11	8	11	48	50	−2	41	
10	Molde	30	12	3	15	46	42	+4	39	
11	HamKam	30	10	7	13	42	47	−5	37	
12	KFUM Oslo	30	8	11	11	42	41	+1	35	
13	Kristiansund	30	9	7	14	34	59	−25	34	
14	Bryne (R)	30	8	7	15	37	56	−19	31	Qualification for the relegation play-offs
15	Strømsgodset (R)	30	6	2	22	37	72	−35	20	Relegation to First Division
16	Haugesund (R)	30	2	3	25	22	80	−58	9	Relegation to First Division

Source: Football Association of Norway (in Norwegian)
Rules for classification: 1) Points; 2) Goal difference; 3) Goals scored; 4) Head-to-head points; 5) Head-to-head goal difference; 6) Head-to-head goals scored.
(C) Champions; (R) Relegated

== Results ==
Home \ Away	B/G	BRA	BRY	FFK	HAM	FKH	KFU	KBK	MOL	RBK	SAN	S08	SIF	TIL	VIK	VIF
Bodø/Glimt		3–0	5–0	5–0	3–0	2–0	3–0	7–1	4–1	4–0	2–0	1–2	1–0	1–1	2–4	7–2
Brann	1–2		3–2	1–0	3–1	4–1	1–1	4–2	0–3	0–0	1–0	2–2	2–1	3–1	3–1	3–2
Bryne	0–1	2–1		4–3	1–1	3–1	0–0	2–0	0–3	2–2	3–2	0–3	2–2	0–2	1–3	1–0
Fredrikstad	0–1	3–0	1–1		1–1	2–2	1–0	3–1	4–2	0–2	3–1	1–1	3–2	0–1	0–1	2–0
HamKam	1–3	1–1	1–0	1–1		5–0	0–0	2–1	2–1	4–0	3–1	1–3	1–2	1–3	2–5	2–1
Haugesund	0–4	0–2	1–4	0–0	0–3		0–2	0–0	0–2	0–3	2–3	3–2	0–5	2–3	1–4	2–3
KFUM	1–2	2–0	1–1	2–1	2–2	1–4		1–1	0–0	4–1	3–1	1–3	5–0	1–3	2–2	0–1
Kristiansund	1–1	2–2	2–1	0–1	1–3	2–0	0–5		2–1	4–1	2–2	0–0	2–1	1–3	0–1	0–2
Molde	2–2	4–0	2–0	1–2	1–0	2–1	2–3	0–1		4–2	1–3	0–2	4–1	2–0	0–1	4–1
Rosenborg	1–1	2–3	3–0	1–0	2–0	1–0	1–1	1–1	0–0		1–1	2–3	6–0	4–1	1–1	1–0
Sandefjord	1–2	0–3	1–0	0–0	2–0	4–0	2–0	6–0	3–0	2–0		3–2	3–2	1–0	1–2	2–1
Sarpsborg	2–5	1–4	1–1	0–2	4–0	3–1	2–1	0–1	1–0	2–2	2–1		2–3	0–1	3–3	1–1
Strømsgodset	0–5	1–2	0–2	0–3	0–3	2–0	1–1	1–2	3–1	1–2	2–6	2–1		2–3	1–2	0–2
Tromsø	2–1	1–2	3–1	0–0	1–0	1–0	2–0	2–3	1–0	1–0	0–1	4–0	3–1		1–3	2–1
Viking	2–4	3–0	5–1	3–0	3–0	5–1	3–1	3–1	1–0	2–1	3–1	0–0	1–0	4–4		5–1
Vålerenga	3–1	2–4	3–2	1–1	1–1	3–0	1–1	3–0 (Note: Vålerenga were awarded a 3–0 victory due to Kristiansund using a suspended player.)	2–3	0–2	2–1	4–0	2–1	1–0	3–1	

Source: Football Association of Norway (in Norwegian)
Legend: Blue = home team win; Yellow = draw; Red = away team win.

== Positions by round ==
Team ╲ Round	1	2	3	4	5	6	7	8	9	10	11	12	13	14	15	16	17	18	19	20	21	22	23	24	25	26	27	28	29	30
Viking	13	8	5	5	6	6	3	2	2	2	2	1	3	3	3	2	2	2	2	2	2	2	2	2	2	2	1	1	1	1
Bodø/Glimt	7	1	2	1	1	1	2	1	1	1	1	2	1	1	1	1	1	1	1	1	1	1	1	1	1	1	2	2	2	2
Tromsø	7	12	13	11	12	10	9	7	5	4	4	3	2	2	2	3	4	4	4	4	4	4	4	4	4	4	4	4	3	3
Brann	16	11	7	3	3	3	4	3	3	3	3	4	4	4	5	4	3	3	3	3	3	3	3	3	3	3	3	3	4	4
Sandefjord	13	7	11	9	4	4	7	5	6	5	6	5	7	5	4	5	5	6	6	7	8	9	7	5	5	5	7	6	5	5
Vålerenga	2	3	8	7	9	11	10	10	11	11	9	9	12	9	10	10	11	10	9	6	7	7	9	7	9	6	5	7	6	6
Rosenborg	5	2	1	2	2	2	1	4	4	6	5	7	5	6	6	6	6	5	5	5	5	5	5	6	6	8	8	8	9	7
Fredrikstad	1	6	4	4	8	7	5	6	7	9	10	10	8	8	8	8	7	8	10	10	6	6	8	10	7	7	6	5	7	8
Sarpsborg	4	4	2	6	7	5	6	8	8	8	7	6	6	7	7	9	10	11	12	11	10	10	11	9	10	9	9	11	10	9
Molde	15	15	15	15	11	9	11	12	13	12	14	14	14	13	13	11	9	9	8	9	11	11	10	11	12	13	12	9	8	10
HamKam	5	13	14	14	14	14	14	13	12	13	12	12	13	14	14	14	14	12	13	13	13	14	14	13	13	11	11	12	11	11
KFUM	2	9	12	13	13	13	15	15	15	14	13	13	11	10	9	7	8	7	7	8	9	8	6	8	8	10	10	10	12	12
Kristiansund	9	10	6	10	5	8	8	9	10	7	8	8	9	12	12	13	13	13	11	12	12	12	12	12	11	12	13	13	13	13
Bryne	11	14	10	12	15	15	13	11	9	10	11	11	10	11	11	12	12	14	14	14	14	13	13	14	14	14	14	14	14	14
Strømsgodset	9	5	9	8	10	12	12	14	14	15	15	15	15	15	15	15	15	15	15	15	15	15	15	15	15	15	15	15	15	15
Haugesund	11	16	16	16	16	16	16	16	16	16	16	16	16	16	16	16	16	16	16	16	16	16	16	16	16	16	16	16	16	16

Leader and Champions League play off round
Champions League second qualifying round
Europa League second qualifying round
Conference League second qualifying round
Relegation play-offs
Relegation to 2026 Norwegian First Division

Source: nifs.no

== Results by round ==
Team ╲ Round	1	2	3	4	5	6	7	8	9	10	11	12	13	14	15	16	17	18	19	20	21	22	23	24	25	26	27	28	29	30
Bodø/Glimt	W	W	D	W	W	W	L	W	W	W	L	D	W	W	W	W	D	W	L	W	W	D	W	W	W	W	L	W	W	W
Brann	L	W	W	W	W	D	D	W	W	L	W	D	W	L	L	W	W	W	W	D	W	W	L	L	W	W	L	D	L	W
Bryne	L	L	W	L	L	L	W	W	W	D	D	D	W	L	L	L	D	L	D	L	L	D	W	L	D	L	W	L	L	W
Fredrikstad	W	L	W	D	L	W	W	L	D	L	L	D	W	D	W	D	W	L	L	D	W	D	L	D	W	D	W	W	L	L
HamKam	W	L	L	L	D	L	D	W	W	L	D	D	L	D	W	L	L	W	D	L	L	L	W	D	W	W	W	L	W	L
Haugesund	L	L	L	D	L	L	L	L	L	L	D	L	L	L	L	L	W	L	L	D	L	L	L	L	L	L	W	L	L	L
KFUM	W	L	L	L	D	L	L	L	D	W	W	D	W	W	W	W	D	D	D	L	D	D	W	D	D	L	L	D	L	L
Kristiansund	L	W	W	L	W	L	W	L	L	W	D	D	D	L	L	L	D	D	W	D	L	W	L	W	D	L	L	W	L	L
Molde	L	L	D	D	W	W	L	L	L	W	L	L	L	W	W	W	W	D	W	L	L	L	W	L	L	L	W	W	W	L
Rosenborg	W	W	W	D	W	D	W	L	D	L	D	L	W	D	W	L	D	W	D	L	W	D	L	L	D	L	L	W	L	W
Sandefjord	L	W	L	W	W	W	L	W	L	W	L	W	L	W	W	L	L	D	D	L	L	L	W	W	W	D	L	W	W	W
Sarpsborg	W	D	W	L	D	W	D	L	D	D	W	W	D	D	L	L	L	L	L	W	W	L	D	W	L	W	L	L	W	W
Strømsgodset	L	W	L	W	L	L	L	L	L	L	L	L	L	L	L	W	L	L	D	W	W	W	L	D	L	L	L	L	L	L
Tromsø	W	L	L	D	L	W	W	W	W	W	W	W	W	W	L	D	D	L	L	W	W	W	W	L	L	W	W	L	W	W
Viking	L	W	W	D	D	W	W	W	W	W	D	W	L	L	W	W	W	W	W	W	D	W	D	W	W	W	W	W	W	W
Vålerenga	W	D	L	W	L	L	D	W	L	L	W	D	L	W	L	W	L	W	W	W	L	D	L	W	L	W	W	L	W	L

Source: Football Association of Norway (in Norwegian)
W = Win; D = Draw; L = Loss

== Relegation play-offs ==
The 14th-placed team in Eliteserien faced the winners of the First Division promotion play-offs over two legs to decide who would play in Eliteserien next season.

7 December 2025
17:00 CET

Bryne	0–4	Aalesund
	Report	Christensen 12', 26'; Ngongo 38' (pen.); Melland 42'

Bryne Stadion, Bryne
Attendance: 2,739
Referee: Mohammad Usman Aslam
11 December 2025
19:00 CET

Aalesund	0–1	Bryne
	Report	Moreira 77'

Color Line Stadion, Ålesund
Attendance: 8,067
Referee: Tore Hansen

Aalesund won 4–1 on aggregate.

== Season statistics ==
=== Top scorers ===
Rank	Player	Club	Goals
1	(Norway) Daniel Karlsbakk	Sarpsborg	18
2	(Denmark) Kasper Høgh	Bodø/Glimt	17
3	(Iceland) Stefán Ingi Sigurðarson	Sandefjord	15
4	(Denmark) Peter Christiansen	Viking	14
4	(Montenegro) Dino Islamović	Rosenborg	14
6	(Portugal) Ieltsin Camões	Tromsø	13
7	(Denmark) Elias Sørensen	Vålerenga	12
8	(Norway) Kristian Lien	HamKam	11
8	(Norway) Zlatko Tripić	Viking	11
10	(Norway) Vegard Erlien	Tromsø	9
10	(Iraq) Marko Farji	Strømsgodset	9

=== Clean sheets ===
Rank	Player	Club	Clean sheets
1	(Russia) Nikita Haikin	Bodø/Glimt	13
2	(Norway) Sander Tangvik	Rosenborg	11
3	(Denmark) Jakob Haugaard	Tromsø	10
4	(Norway) Jacob Karlstrøm	Molde	9
5	(Syria) Elias Hadaya	Sandefjord	8
6	(Norway) Emil Ødegaard	KFUM	7
7	(Senegal) Mamour Ndiaye	Sarpsborg 08	6
7	(Sweden) Marcus Sandberg	HamKam	6
9	(Norway) Mathias Dyngeland	Brann	5
9	(Denmark) Jonathan Fischer	Fredrikstad	5
9	(Norway) Arild Østbø	Viking	5

=== Hat-tricks ===
Player	For	Against	Result	Date
(Norway) Sander Kilen	Kristiansund	Tromsø	3–2 (A)	20 April 2025
(Norway) Vegard Erlien	Tromsø	Viking	4–4 (A)	27 April 2025
(Norway) Zlatko Tripić	Viking	Haugesund	5–1 (H)	30 April 2025
(Norway) Daniel Karlsbakk	Sarpsborg	Haugesund	3–1 (H)	6 July 2025
(Iceland) Stefán Ingi Sigurðarson	Sandefjord	Kristiansund	6–0 (H)	20 July 2025
(Montenegro) Dino Islamović ^{4}	Rosenborg	Tromsø	4–1 (H)	27 July 2025
(Mali) Sory Ibrahim Diarra	Haugesund	KFUM	4–1 (A)	2 November 2025

Notes

^{4} Player scored 4 goals
(H) – Home team
(A) – Away team

=== Discipline ===
==== Player ====
- Most yellow cards: 9
  - (Norway) Sverre Sandal (KFUM)
- Most red cards: 2
  - (Norway) Henrik Bjørdal (Vålerenga)
  - (Norway) Marius Berntsen Olsen (Kristiansund)

==== Club ====
- Most yellow cards: 66
  - Molde
- Fewest yellow cards: 20
  - Bodø/Glimt
- Most red cards: 4
  - Vålerenga
- Fewest red cards: 0
  - Fredrikstad

== Awards ==
=== Monthly awards ===
Month	Coach of the Month		Player of the Month		Young Player of the Month		Goal of the Month		References
Month	Coach	Club	Player	Club	Player	Club	Player	Club	References
April	(Sweden) Alfred Johansson	Rosenborg	(Senegal) Fallou Fall	Fredrikstad	(Iraq) Marko Farji	Strømsgodset	(Norway) Henrik Bjørdal	Vålerenga	
May	(Norway) Bjarte Lunde Aarsheim (Norway) Morten Jensen	Viking	(Norway) Henrik Falchener	Viking	(The Gambia) Abubacarr Sedi Kinteh	Tromsø	(Norway) Kent-Are Antonsen	Tromsø	
June/July	(Norway) Jørgen Vik	Tromsø	(Norway) Patrick Berg	Bodø/Glimt	(Norway) Jens Hjertø-Dahl	Tromsø	(Norway) Jo Inge Berget (June)	Sarpsborg 08	
June/July	(Norway) Jørgen Vik	Tromsø	(Norway) Patrick Berg	Bodø/Glimt	(Norway) Jens Hjertø-Dahl	Tromsø	(Norway) Fredrik Gulbrandsen (July)	Molde	
August/September	(Iceland) Freyr Alexandersson	Brann	(Norway) Ruben Yttergård Jenssen	Tromsø	(Norway) Johan Bakke	Strømsgodset	(Belgium) Denzel De Roeve (August)	Brann	
August/September	(Iceland) Freyr Alexandersson	Brann	(Norway) Ruben Yttergård Jenssen	Tromsø	(Norway) Johan Bakke	Strømsgodset	(Norway) Felix Horn Myhre (September)	Brann	
October	(Norway) Thomas Myhre	HamKam	(Denmark) Peter Christiansen	Viking	(Norway) Edvin Austbø	Viking	(Norway) Markus Haaland	Brann	
November	(Norway) Bjarte Lunde Aarsheim (Norway) Morten Jensen	Viking	(Norway) Emil Breivik	Molde	(Norway) Jens Hjertø-Dahl	Tromsø	Not awarded		

=== Annual awards ===
Award	Winner	Club
Coach of the Year	(Norway) Bjarte Lunde Aarsheim (Norway) Morten Jensen	Viking
Player of the Year	(Norway) Patrick Berg	Bodø/Glimt
Young Player of the Year	(Norway) Edvin Austbø	Viking

== League attendances ==
Pos	Team	Total	High	Low	Average	Change
1	Brann	241,295	17,500	14,081	16,086	+2.1%
2	Rosenborg	216,650	21,263	9,218	14,443	+4.5%
3	Viking	205,962	15,900	9,644	13,731	+11.1%
4	Vålerenga	166,495	16,556	0	11,100	+22.1%^{1}
5	Fredrikstad	137,488	12,560	6,760	9,166	+8.0%
6	Bodø/Glimt	102,644	8,173	5,910	6,843	+3.1%
7	Molde	94,018	9,293	5,057	6,268	−12.6%
8	Strømsgodset	79,037	8,332	3,852	5,269	+6.6%
9	Sarpsborg	76,152	8,022	3,849	5,077	−0.6%
10	Tromsø	74,369	6,691	3,632	4,958	+7.8%
11	Sandefjord	72,186	6,598	2,907	4,812	+20.8%
12	HamKam	59,714	6,118	2,828	3,981	−3.6%
13	Haugesund	56,275	6,066	2,731	3,752	−24.4%
14	Kristiansund	49,352	4,364	2,893	3,290	−8.5%
15	Bryne	45,702	5,500	2,003	3,047	+64.0%^{1}
16	KFUM	32,556	3,501	1,327	2,170	−23.9%
	League total	1,709,895	21,263	0	7,123	+3.1%

Source: nifs.no
Notes:
1: Team played last season in 1. divisjon.

== See also ==
- 2025 Norwegian First Division
- 2025 Norwegian Second Division
- 2025 Norwegian Third Division
- 2025 Norwegian Football Cup
- 2025–26 Norwegian Football Cup
