= 2024 Eliteserien =

80th season of top-tier football league in Norway

Eliteserien
- Season: 2024
- Dates: 31 March – 1 December
- Champions: Bodø/Glimt; 4th title
- Relegated: Lillestrøm; Odd
- Champions League: Bodø/Glimt; Brann
- Europa League: Fredrikstad
- Conference League: Viking; Rosenborg
- Matches: 240
- Goals: 681 (2.84 per match)
- Top goalscorer: Kristian Eriksen (14 goals)
- Biggest home win: Bodø/Glimt 6–0 Sarpsborg (24 August 2024)
- Biggest away win: Sarpsborg 1–7 HamKam (16 May 2024)
- Highest scoring: Sarpsborg 1–7 HamKam (16 May 2024); Molde 5–3 Tromsø (28 September 2024)
- Longest winning run: 7 matches Brann
- Longest unbeaten run: 9 matches Fredrikstad
- Longest winless run: 11 matches Lillestrøm
- Longest losing run: 6 matches Lillestrøm
- Highest attendance: 21,426; Rosenborg - KFUM (16 May 2024); Rosenborg - Molde (1 September 2024); Rosenborg - Brann (20 October 2024)
- Lowest attendance: 0 (Note: The round 15 fixture between Rosenborg and Lillestrøm was abandoned due to fan protests against VAR. The game was stopped multiple times by fans throwing objects onto the pitch, as part of nationwide fan protests against VAR and its implementation in Eliteserien. After objects were thrown a fourth time referee Rohit Saggi decided to abandon the match. The teams were forced by NFF to replay the match without spectators.); Rosenborg - Lillestrøm (21 August 2024)
- Average attendance: 6,907

The 2024 Eliteserien was the 80th season of top-tier football in Norway. This was the eighth season of Eliteserien after rebranding from Tippeligaen.

The season started on 31 March 2024 and ended on 1 December 2024, not including play-off matches.

Bodø/Glimt were the defending champions. Fredrikstad, KFUM and Kristiansund joined as the promoted clubs from the 2023 Norwegian First Division. They replaced Vålerenga, Stabæk and Aalesund, who were relegated to the 2024 Norwegian First Division.

Bodø/Glimt successfully defended their title, winning their fourth title in five years, and earned an entry to the 2025-26 UEFA Champions League play-off round.

== Teams ==
Sixteen teams compete in the league – the top thirteen teams from the previous season and three teams promoted from the First Division. The promoted teams were Fredrikstad, KFUM and Kristiansund. Kristiansund and Fredrikstad were promoted after respectively 1 and 11 seasons absent, while KFUM were promoted for the first time in their history. They replaced Vålerenga, Stabæk and Aalesund, ending their top flight spells of 22 years, 1 year and 2 years respectively.

=== Stadiums and locations ===
Locations of the teams in the 2024 Eliteserien

Note: Table lists in alphabetical order.

Team	Ap.	Location	County	Arena	Turf	Capacity
Bodø/Glimt	29	Bodø	Nordland	Aspmyra Stadion	Artificial	8,300
Brann	66	Bergen	Vestland	Brann Stadion	Natural	16,750
Fredrikstad	43	Fredrikstad	Østfold	Fredrikstad Stadion	Artificial	12,560
HamKam	25	Hamar	Innlandet	Briskeby Stadion	Artificial	7,800
Haugesund	18	Haugesund	Rogaland	Haugesund Arena	Natural	8,754
KFUM	1	Oslo	Oslo	KFUM Arena (Note: KFUM played some home games at Intility Arena.)	Artificial	3,300
Kristiansund	7	Kristiansund	Møre og Romsdal	Kristiansund Stadion (Note: Kristiansund played some home games at Aker Stadion.)	Artificial	4,444
Lillestrøm	60	Lillestrøm	Akershus	Åråsen Stadion	Natural	11,500
Molde	48	Molde	Møre og Romsdal	Aker Stadion	Artificial	11,249
Odd	43	Skien	Telemark	Skagerak Arena	Artificial	11,767
Rosenborg	61	Trondheim	Trøndelag	Lerkendal Stadion	Natural	21,421
Sandefjord	12	Sandefjord	Vestfold	Sandefjord Arena	Artificial	6,582
Sarpsborg	13	Sarpsborg	Østfold	Sarpsborg Stadion	Artificial	8,022
Strømsgodset	37	Drammen	Buskerud	Marienlyst Stadion	Artificial	8,935
Tromsø	36	Tromsø	Troms	Romssa Arena	Artificial	6,687
Viking	74	Stavanger	Rogaland	Viking Stadion	Artificial	15,900

=== Personnel and kits ===
Team	Manager(s)	Captain	Kit manufacturer	Kit sponsor(s)	
Team	Manager(s)	Captain	Kit manufacturer	Main	Other
Bodø/Glimt	(Norway) Kjetil Knutsen	(Norway) Patrick Berg (Note: Bodø/Glimt play with a captaincy team who decide between themselves who will be the captain on a game-by-game basis, Patrick Berg is the most common choice. The full team consists of Ulrik Saltnes, Jostein Gundersen, Sondre Sørli, Patrick Berg, Sondre Brunstad Fet, Jens Petter Hauge and Brede Moe.)	Puma	SpareBank 1 Nord-Norge	List: Front: Action Now, Elkem; Back: The Quartz Corp, MOT; Sleeves: Bodø Energi / Elkem (in UEFA matches); Shorts: Leonhard Nilsen & Sønner, LæreriNord; Socks: Coop Norge
Brann	(Norway) Eirik Horneland	(Norway) Fredrik Pallesen Knudsen	Nike	Sparebanken Vest	List: Front: Eviny, BOB BBL; Back: FotMob, MOT; Sleeves: REMA 1000; Shorts: Lerøy, EGD Holding; Socks: Tide
Fredrikstad	(Norway) Andreas Hagen	(Iceland) Júlíus Magnússon	Craft	OBOS	List: Front: Terje Høili, Stene Stål Gjenvinning; Back: Europris; Sleeves: Værste AS; Shorts: Unger Fabrikker, McDonald's; Socks: Toyota Østfold
HamKam	(Denmark) Jakob Michelsen	(Norway) Fredrik Sjølstad	Puma	OBOS	List: Front: CC Hamar, Eidsiva Energi; Back: SpareBank 1 Østlandet; Sleeves: Pepsi; Shorts: Norsk Tipping, AJ Produkter; Socks: None
Haugesund	(Denmark) Sancheev Manoharan	(Norway) Egil Selvik	Umbro	Haugaland Kraft	List: Front: DeepOcean, Haugesund Sparebank; Back: AutoStore System, Mær enn tri poeng; Sleeves: Wee.no; Shorts: PURO Hotels, Coop Norge; Socks: Volkswagen
KFUM	(Norway) Johannes Moesgaard	(Norway) Robin Rasch	Hummel	OBOS	List: Front: Kiwi Minipris; Back: Arctic Asset Management; Sleeves: Intility; Shorts: Nord West Eiendom, R Utemiljø; Socks: Nettavisen
Kristiansund	(Norway) Amund Skiri	(Norway) Dan Peter Ulvestad	Puma	SpareBank 1 Nordmøre	List: Front: Coop Norge, Lerøy; Back: Slatlem, MOT; Sleeves: FG Eiendom; Shorts: Olivita Kapsler, Alti Storkaia; Socks: Nordmøre Energiverk
Lillestrøm	(Norway) Dag-Eilev Fagermo	(Norway) Ruben Gabrielsen	Puma	Romerike Sparebank	List: Front: Åråsen Eiendom, Advokatfirmaet Nicolaisen; Back: Coop Norge, MOT; Sleeves: Creative Heads AS; Shorts: Åkrene Mek. Verksted, AJ Produkter; Socks: Romerikes Blad
Molde	(Norway) Erling Moe	(Norway) Magnus Wolff Eikrem	Adidas	Sparebanken Møre	List: Front: Wenaas; Back: Brunvoll, MOT; Sleeves: Istad; Shorts: BDO Global; Socks: Stiftelsen VI
Odd	(Norway) Knut Rønningene	(Norway) Steffen Hagen	Hummel	Skagerak Energi	List: Front: SpareBank 1 Sør-Norge, Aider Konsern; Back: Kirkens Bymisjon; Sleeves: None; Shorts: ABB; Socks: None
Rosenborg	(Sweden) Alfred Johansson	(Norway) Markus Henriksen	Adidas	SpareBank 1 SMN	List: Front: Scandic Hotels; Back: Coop Norge, MOT; Sleeves: SalMar; Shorts: Adresseavisen; Socks: Vintervoll
Sandefjord	(Norway) Hans Erik Ødegaard (Sweden) Andreas Tegström	(Sweden) Filip Ottosson	Macron	Jotun	List: Front: SpareBank 1 Sør-Norge, BDO Global; Back: Harmonie Norge, Fotballstiftelsen; Sleeves: iteam AS; Shorts: Color Line; Socks: None
Sarpsborg	(Norway) Christian Michelsen	(Norway) Jo Inge Berget	Hummel	Borregaard	List: Front: Assist Consulting AS, Pretec Group; Back: Frigaard Gruppen, Lions Clubs International; Sleeves: Økonomi-deler; Shorts: DNB, Flexi Regnskap; Socks: None
Strømsgodset	(Norway) Jørgen Isnes	(Norway) Gustav Valsvik	Puma	Sparebanken Øst	List: Front: Kiwi Minipris, Å Energi; Back: H-vinduet Fjerdingstad, Blått hjerte; Sleeves: Quality Hotel River Station; Shorts: ARBO Entreprenør; Socks: None
Tromsø	(Norway) Jørgen Vik (Norway) Gard Holme	(Norway) Ruben Yttergård Jenssen	Select	SpareBank 1 Nord-Norge	List: Front: Consto, Harila Bilforhandler; Back: Ishavskraft, MOT; Sleeves: Explo Energidrikk; Shorts: Extra (Coop), C&M Brannsikring; Socks: Kræmer
Viking	(Norway) Bjarte Lunde Aarsheim (Norway) Morten Jensen	(Norway) Zlatko Tripić	Diadora	Lyse	List: Front: OBOS, SpareBank 1 Sør-Norge; Back: Bouvet, Kraft og Kjærlighet; Sleeves: NiceMobil; Shorts: Coop Norge, BDO Global; Socks: Coop Norge

=== Managerial changes ===
Team	Outgoing manager	Manner of departure	Date of vacancy	Position in the table	Incoming manager	Date of appointment
Haugesund	(Denmark) Sancheev Manoharan (caretaker)	End of caretaker spell	3 December 2023	Pre-season	(Iceland) Óskar Hrafn Þorvaldsson	3 December 2023
Rosenborg	(Norway) Svein Maalen (caretaker)	End of caretaker spell	14 December 2023	Pre-season	(Sweden) Alfred Johansson	14 December 2023
Lillestrøm	(Norway) Eirik Bakke (caretaker)	End of caretaker spell	21 December 2023	Pre-season	(Sweden) Andreas Georgson	21 December 2023
Odd	(Norway) Pål Arne Johansen	Signed by Häcken	27 December 2023	Pre-season	(Norway) Kenneth Dokken	16 January 2024
Tromsø	(Norway) Gaute Helstrup	Signed by Bodø/Glimt	2 January 2024	Pre-season	(Norway) Jørgen Vik (Norway) Gard Holme	8 January 2024
Haugesund	(Iceland) Óskar Hrafn Þorvaldsson	Mutual consent	10 May 2024	13th	(Denmark) Sancheev Manoharan	10 May 2024
Sarpsborg	(Sweden) Stefan Billborn	Mutual consent	23 June 2024	15th	(Norway) Christian Michelsen	25 June 2024
Fredrikstad	(Faroe Islands) Mikkjal Thomassen	Signed by AIK	15 July 2024	5th	(Norway) Andreas Hagen	15 July 2024
Lillestrøm	(Sweden) Andreas Georgson	Signed by Manchester United	26 July 2024	8th	(Sweden) Robin Asterhed	26 July 2024
Lillestrøm	(Sweden) Robin Asterhed	Moved to assistant coach	23 August 2024	13th	(Denmark) David Nielsen	23 August 2024
Lillestrøm	(Denmark) David Nielsen	Mutual consent	30 September 2024	16th	(Norway) Dag-Eilev Fagermo	30 September 2024
Odd	(Norway) Kenneth Dokken	Sacked	13 November 2024	16th	(Norway) Knut Rønningene	13 November 2024

== League table ==
Pos	Team	Pld	W	D	L	GF	GA	GD	Pts	Qualification or relegation
1	Bodø/Glimt (C)	30	18	8	4	71	31	+40	62	Qualification for the Champions League play-off round
2	Brann	30	17	8	5	55	33	+22	59	Qualification for the Champions League second qualifying round
3	Viking	30	16	9	5	61	39	+22	57	Qualification for the Conference League second qualifying round
4	Rosenborg	30	16	5	9	52	39	+13	53	Qualification for the Conference League second qualifying round
5	Molde	30	15	7	8	64	36	+28	52	
6	Fredrikstad	30	14	9	7	39	35	+4	51	Qualification for the Europa League third qualifying round (Note: Fredrikstad qualified for the Europa League third qualifying round by winning the 2024 Norwegian Football Cup.)
7	Strømsgodset	30	10	8	12	32	40	−8	38	
8	KFUM	30	9	10	11	35	36	−1	37	
9	Sarpsborg	30	10	7	13	43	55	−12	37	
10	Sandefjord	30	9	7	14	41	46	−5	34	
11	Kristiansund	30	8	10	12	32	45	−13	34	
12	HamKam	30	8	9	13	34	39	−5	33	
13	Tromsø	30	9	6	15	34	44	−10	33	
14	Haugesund (O)	30	9	6	15	29	46	−17	33	Qualification for the relegation play-offs
15	Lillestrøm (R)	30	7	3	20	33	63	−30	24	Relegation to First Division
16	Odd (R)	30	5	8	17	26	54	−28	23	Relegation to First Division

Source: Football Association of Norway (in Norwegian)
Rules for classification: 1) Points; 2) Goal difference; 3) Goals scored; 4) Head-to-head points; 5) Head-to-head goal difference; 6) Head-to-head goals scored.
(C) Champions; (O) Play-off winners; (R) Relegated

== Positions by round ==
Team ╲ Round	1	2	3	4	5	6	7	8	9	10	11	12	13	14	15	16	17	18	19	20	21	22	23	24	25	26	27	28	29	30
Bodø/Glimt	3	2	1	1	1	1	1	1	1	1	1	1	1	1	1	1	1	1	1	1	1	1	1	1	1	1	1	2	1	1
Brann	2	6	6	5	5	3	2	4	3	4	4	5	5	5	5	5	4	3	2	2	2	4	2	2	2	2	2	1	2	2
Viking	7	9	9	11	9	6	5	6	5	5	5	4	4	3	4	2	2	2	4	4	4	3	4	4	4	4	3	3	3	3
Rosenborg	3	5	3	3	4	9	6	7	10	8	8	10	8	11	8	8	7	8	6	6	6	5	5	5	6	5	5	5	5	4
Molde	1	1	2	2	2	2	3	2	4	3	3	3	2	2	3	4	5	4	3	3	3	2	3	3	3	3	4	4	4	5
Fredrikstad	14	7	7	9	6	4	4	3	2	2	2	2	3	4	2	3	3	5	5	5	5	6	6	6	5	6	6	6	6	6
Strømsgodset	16	12	5	4	3	5	7	10	7	6	6	6	6	6	9	10	11	11	10	11	12	12	11	11	11	9	9	7	7	7
KFUM	8	13	13	9	10	7	9	5	6	7	7	8	10	8	6	6	8	6	7	7	7	7	7	7	7	7	7	8	8	8
Sarpsborg	12	15	14	16	13	10	11	14	13	14	14	15	13	12	13	11	9	9	11	12	8	9	12	12	12	12	10	10	11	9
Sandefjord	14	16	16	15	16	14	10	13	15	16	16	16	16	14	15	14	15	16	16	14	14	14	14	14	13	13	13	11	9	10
Kristiansund	5	3	10	6	7	8	8	11	9	11	9	9	7	10	7	7	6	7	9	10	11	8	8	9	8	10	11	12	10	11
HamKam	8	14	15	14	15	15	16	12	8	10	12	11	11	9	11	12	12	10	8	8	9	10	9	8	9	8	8	9	12	12
Tromsø	13	10	11	13	14	16	14	15	14	12	13	14	14	15	14	15	16	13	12	9	10	11	10	10	10	11	12	13	13	13
Haugesund	6	11	4	7	11	12	12	9	11	9	10	12	12	13	12	13	13	15	14	13	13	13	13	13	14	14	14	14	14	14
Lillestrøm	10	4	12	8	8	11	13	7	12	13	11	7	9	7	10	9	10	12	13	15	15	15	16	16	16	15	15	15	15	15
Odd	11	7	7	12	12	13	15	16	16	15	15	13	15	16	16	16	14	14	15	16	16	16	15	15	15	16	16	16	16	16

Leader and Champions League play off round
Champions League second qualifying round
Conference League second qualifying round
Relegation play-offs
Relegation to 2025 Norwegian First Division

Source: nifs.no

== Results ==
Home \ Away	BOD	BRA	FRE	HAM	HAU	KFU	KRI	LIL	MOL	ODD	ROS	SAN	SAR	STR	TRO	VIK
Bodø/Glimt	—	5–1	2–2	3–0	4–2	2–2	4–0	5–2	1–1	3–1	2–3	1–1	6–0	1–0	4–0	1–0
Brann	4–1	—	0–2	1–0	1–1	2–0	2–1	2–1	1–3	2–0	3–0	2–1	1–3	0–0	4–0	1–1
Fredrikstad	0–2	0–4	—	1–0	1–0	0–0	1–1	2–1	0–0	2–0	2–2	1–0	2–2	4–1	0–0	3–2
HamKam	1–0	1–2	0–1	—	2–2	0–2	1–0	5–0	0–1	1–0	0–2	1–1	0–2	0–1	0–0	3–3
Haugesund	0–1	0–1	1–0	0–1	—	0–1	1–0	0–2	0–3	2–1	1–3	2–1	1–2	0–0	2–0	1–0
KFUM	1–1	0–0	1–4	1–1	0–0	—	1–2	2–0	1–1	0–0	1–0	3–3	1–2	1–3	0–1	1–2
Kristiansund	2–4	2–2	3–1	1–1	2–2	1–1	—	2–1	0–4	0–0	0–4	2–1	3–1	0–0	1–0	0–1
Lillestrøm	0–5	0–2	0–3	1–1	0–1	2–1	2–3	—	1–2	3–0	1–1	0–3	2–2	3–1	0–1	1–4
Molde	3–3	2–1	6–1	3–0	2–1	2–3	2–0	3–0	—	1–2	2–2	0–1	2–4	4–0	5–3	2–2
Odd	0–2	0–3	0–2	1–2	1–2	1–3	1–1	2–1	0–4	—	1–3	2–2	1–1	2–0	1–0	3–3
Rosenborg	1–3	1–2	1–1	1–0	4–0	1–3	2–1	4–0	2–1	2–1	—	2–0	1–1	1–0	1–0	2–1
Sandefjord	2–1	2–2	0–1	1–2	4–3	2–1	1–0	0–1	3–1	1–0	0–1	—	4–1	2–2	1–2	0–3
Sarpsborg	1–2	1–1	0–1	1–7	2–2	0–2	0–2	1–0	2–2	0–1	4–1	2–1	—	1–3	2–1	1–2
Strømsgodset	0–1	2–3	2–0	1–1	2–0	1–0	2–2	3–2	1–0	1–1	1–0	1–1	2–1	—	0–1	0–1
Tromsø	0–0	2–4	3–0	3–3	0–1	1–2	0–0	1–2	0–2	4–0	3–2	3–0	0–3	2–0	—	2–2
Viking	1–1	1–1	1–1	3–0	5–1	1–0	2–0	1–4	1–0	3–3	4–2	3–2	1–0	5–2	2–1	—

Source: Football Association of Norway (in Norwegian)
Legend: Blue = home team win; Yellow = draw; Red = away team win.

== Relegation play-offs ==
The 14th-placed team in Eliteserien faced the winners of the First Division promotion play-offs over two legs to decide who would play in Eliteserien next season.

5 December 2024
18:30 CET

Moss	0–0	Haugesund
	Report

Melløs Stadion, Moss
Attendance: 2,557
Referee: Tore Hansen
8 December 2024
14:30 CET

Haugesund	2–0	Moss
Håpnes 24' (o.g.); Liseth 34'	Report

Haugesund Sparebank Arena, Haugesund
Attendance: 5,851
Referee: Rohit Saggi

== Season statistics ==
=== Top scorers ===
Rank	Player	Club	Goals
1	(Norway) Kristian Eriksen	Molde	14
2	(Denmark) Kasper Høgh	Bodø/Glimt	12
2	(Norway) Lars-Jørgen Salvesen	Viking	12
2	(Norway) Magnus Wolff Eikrem	Molde	12
5	(Norway) Aune Heggebø	Brann	11
6	(Norway) Morten Bjørlo	Fredrikstad	10
6	(Norway) Ola Brynhildsen	Molde	10
6	(Norway) Johannes Nuñez	KFUM	10
6	(Norway) Ole Sæter	Rosenborg	10
6	(Norway) Zlatko Tripić	Viking	10

=== Clean sheets ===
Rank	Player	Club	Clean sheets
1	(Denmark) Jonathan Fischer	Fredrikstad	13
2	(Russia) Nikita Haikin	Bodø/Glimt	12
3	(Norway) Mathias Dyngeland	Brann	11
4	(Norway) Per Kristian Bråtveit	Strømsgodset	9
4	(Denmark) Jakob Haugaard	Tromsø	9
6	(Norway) Egil Selvik	Haugesund	8
6	(Norway) Sander Tangvik	Rosenborg	8
8	(Poland) Albert Posiadała	Molde	7
8	(Norway) Emil Ødegaard	KFUM	7
10	(Sweden) Marcus Sandberg	HamKam	6

=== Hat-tricks ===
Player	For	Against	Result	Date
(Denmark) Henrik Meister ^{4}	Sarpsborg	Rosenborg	4–1 (H)	12 July 2024
(Norway) Sverre Nypan	Rosenborg	Lillestrøm	4–0 (H)	21 August 2024
(Norway) Lars-Jørgen Salvesen	Viking	Sandefjord	3–2 (H)	2 November 2024

Notes

^{4} Player scored 4 goals
(H) – Home team
(A) – Away team

=== Discipline ===
==== Player ====
- Most yellow cards: 8
  - (Norway) Ulrik Yttergård Jenssen (Rosenborg)
- Most red cards: 2
  - (Norway) Haitam Aleesami (KFUM)
  - (Norway) Stian Kristiansen (Sandefjord)
  - (Norway) Fredrik Sjølstad (HamKam)
  - (Angola) Vá (Lillestrøm)

==== Club ====
- Most yellow cards: 60
  - Haugesund
- Fewest yellow cards: 29
  - Bodø/Glimt
- Most red cards: 4
  - HamKam
- Fewest red cards: 0
  - Kristiansund
  - Molde
  - Rosenborg
  - Sarpsborg
  - Strømsgodset

== Awards ==
=== Monthly awards ===
Month	Coach of the Month		Player of the Month		Young Player of the Month		References
Month	Coach	Club	Player	Club	Player	Club	References
April	(Norway) Kjetil Knutsen	Bodø/Glimt	(Norway) Jostein Gundersen	Bodø/Glimt	(Norway) Oskar Sivertsen	Kristiansund	
May	(Faroe Islands) Mikkjal Thomassen	Fredrikstad	(Denmark) Jonathan Fischer	Fredrikstad	(Norway) Petter Nosa Dahl	KFUM	
July	(Norway) Johannes Moesgaard	KFUM	(Denmark) Henrik Meister	Sarpsborg 08	(Denmark) Henrik Meister	Sarpsborg 08	
August	(Sweden) Alfred Johansson	Rosenborg	(Norway) Marius Broholm	Rosenborg	(Norway) Marius Broholm	Rosenborg	
September	(Norway) Erling Moe	Molde	(Norway) Magnus Wolff Eikrem	Molde	(Norway) Fredrik Sjøvold	Bodø/Glimt	
October/November	(Norway) Eirik Horneland	Brann	(Chile) Niklas Castro	Brann	(Norway) Filip Loftesnes-Bjune	Sandefjord	

=== Annual awards ===
Award	Winner	Club
Coach of the Season	(Norway) Johannes Moesgaard	KFUM
Player of the Season	(Norway) Zlatko Tripic	Viking
Young Player of the Season	(Norway) Sverre Nypan	Rosenborg
Goal of the Season	(Norway) Ole Sæter	Rosenborg

== League attendances ==
Pos	Team	Total	High	Low	Average	Change
1	Brann	236,378	16,750	14,230	15,759	+3.7%
2	Rosenborg	207,236	21,426	0	13,816	−2.0%
3	Viking	185,465	15,900	10,024	12,364	−4.3%
4	Fredrikstad	127,350	12,504	5,578	8,490	+75.1%^{1}
5	Lillestrøm	110,554	9,731	5,918	7,370	−1.8%
6	Molde	107,632	10,746	5,753	7,175	+7.4%
7	Bodø/Glimt	99,595	8,257	5,415	6,640	−3.5%
8	Sarpsborg	76,621	8,022	3,897	5,108	+3.6%
9	Haugesund	74,441	7,620	3,615	4,963	−0.4%
10	Strømsgodset	74,121	6,206	4,207	4,941	−9.1%
11	Odd	70,974	6,325	3,781	4,732	−8.3%
12	Tromsø	68,981	6,991	3,637	4,599	−5.1%
13	HamKam	61,941	6,218	2,508	4,129	−1.0%
14	Sandefjord	59,777	6,598	3,115	3,985	+3.0%
15	Kristiansund	53,944	4,309	3,108	3,596	+10.8%^{1}
16	KFUM	42,764	4,018	1,764	2,851	+161.8%^{1}
	League total	1,657,774	21,426	0	6,907	−4.6%

Source: nifs.no
Notes:
1: Team played last season in 1. divisjon.
