= 2026 Eliteserien =

Football league season in Norway

Eliteserien
- Season: 2026
- Dates: 14 March – 13 December 2026
- Champions League: Bodø/Glimt; Viking
- Matches: 152
- Goals: 467 (3.07 per match)
- Top goalscorer: Amin Chiakha; Peter Christiansen (19 goals)
- Biggest home win: Viking 8–1 Kristiansund (13 September 2026)
- Biggest away win: Tromsø 0–5 Brann (29 April 2026)
- Highest scoring: Aalesund 5–5 Vålerenga (16 August 2026)
- Longest winning run: 9 matches Viking
- Longest unbeaten run: 12 matches Bodø/Glimt
- Longest winless run: 10 matches Start
- Longest losing run: 4 matches Fredrikstad
- Highest attendance: 21,426; Rosenborg 2–3 Aalesund (16 May 2026)
- Lowest attendance: 1,365; KFUM 1–2 Sandefjord (7 April 2026)
- All statistics correct as of 7 September 2026.

The 2026 Eliteserien is the 82nd season of top-tier football in Norway.

This is the tenth season of Eliteserien after rebranding from Tippeligaen.

The season started on 14 March and will end on 13 December 2026, not including playoff matches.

Viking are the defending champions. Lillestrøm, Start, and Aalesund joined as the promoted clubs from the 2025 Norwegian First Division. They replaced Strømsgodset, Haugesund, and Bryne, who were relegated to the 2026 Norwegian First Division.

== Teams ==
Locations of the teams in the 2026 Eliteserien
Locations of the teams in the 2026 Eliteserien in Oslo

Sixteen teams compete in the league – the top thirteen teams from the previous season and three teams promoted from the First Division. The promoted teams are Lillestrøm, Start, and Aalesund, who were promoted after respectively 1, 5, and 2 seasons absent. They replaced Strømsgodset, Haugesund, and Bryne, ending their top flight spells of 19, 15, and 1 year(s) respectively.

=== Changes from the previous season ===
Promoted to Eliteserien

- Lillestrøm
- Start
- Aalesund

Relegated to First Division

- Bryne
- Strømsgodset
- Haugesund

=== Stadiums and locations ===
Note: Table lists in alphabetical order

Team	Ap.	Location	County	Arena	Turf	Capacity
Aalesund	20	Ålesund	Møre og Romsdal	Color Line Stadion	Artificial	10,778
Bodø/Glimt	31	Bodø	Nordland	Aspmyra Stadion	Artificial	8,200
Brann	68	Bergen	Vestland	Brann Stadion	Natural	17,500
Fredrikstad	45	Fredrikstad	Østfold	Fredrikstad Stadion	Artificial	12,560
HamKam	27	Hamar	Innlandet	Briskeby Stadion	Artificial	8,068
KFUM	3	Oslo	Oslo	KFUM Arena	Artificial	3,300
Kristiansund	9	Kristiansund	Møre og Romsdal	Nordmøre Stadion	Artificial	4,364
Lillestrøm	60	Lillestrøm	Akershus	Åråsen	Natural	10,540
Molde	50	Molde	Møre og Romsdal	Aker Stadion	Artificial	11,249
Rosenborg	63	Trondheim	Trøndelag	Lerkendal Stadion	Natural	21,423
Sandefjord	14	Sandefjord	Vestfold	Jotun Arena	Artificial	6,582
Sarpsborg	15	Sarpsborg	Østfold	Sarpsborg Stadion	Artificial	8,022
Start	43	Kristiansand	Agder	Sparebanken Norge Arena Kristiansand	Artificial	14,448
Tromsø	38	Tromsø	Troms	Romssa Arena	Artificial	6,691
Viking	76	Stavanger	Rogaland	Lyse Arena	Artificial	15,900
Vålerenga	65	Oslo	Oslo	Intility Arena	Artificial	16,556

=== Personnel and kits ===
Team	Manager(s)	Captain	Kit manufacturer	Kit sponsors	
Team	Manager(s)	Captain	Kit manufacturer	Main	Other(s)
Aalesund	(Norway) Kjetil Rekdal	(Denmark) Paul Ngongo	Umbro	Sparebanken Møre	List: Front: Sundolitt, Intersport; Back: Tafjord Kraft, MOT; Sleeves: Jangaard; Shorts: Color Line; Socks: Sunnmørsposten
Bodø/Glimt	(Norway) Kjetil Knutsen	Captaincy team (Note: Bodø/Glimt play with a captaincy team who decide between themselves who will be the captain on a game-by-game basis, Patrick Berg is the most common choice. The full team consists of Berg, Sondre Brunstad Fet, Jostein Gundersen, Jens Petter Hauge, and Ulrik Saltnes.)	Puma	SpareBank 1 Nord-Norge	List: Front: Stingray Marine Solutions, Elkem; Back: The Quartz Corp, Action Now; Sleeves: Leonhard Nilsen & Sønner; Shorts: None; Socks: Coop Norge
Brann	(Norway) Eirik Horneland	(Norway) Fredrik Pallesen Knudsen	Nike	Sparebanken Norge	List: Front: Eviny, BOB; Back: FotMob, MOT; Sleeves: REMA 1000; Shorts: Lerøy, EGD Holding; Socks: None
Fredrikstad	(Denmark) Casper Røjkjær	Captaincy team (Note: Fredrikstad play with a captaincy team who decide between themselves who will be the captain on a game-by-game basis. The full team consists of Sigurd Kvile, Solomon Owusu, Simen Rafn, and Sondre Sørløkk.)	Craft	OBOS	List: Front: Terje Høili, Stene Stål Gjenvinning; Back: Europris, SpareBank 1 Østfold Akershus; Sleeves: Værste; Shorts: Unger, McDonald's; Socks: Toyota Østfold
HamKam	(Norway) Thomas Myhre	(Norway) Fredrik Sjølstad	Puma	OBOS	List: Front: CC Hamar, Eidsiva Energi; Back: SpareBank 1 Østlandet, Kiwi Ridabu; Sleeves: Pepsi; Shorts: Norsk Tipping, AJ Produkter; Socks: Betong ØST
KFUM	(Norway) Jørgen Isnes	(Norway) Robin Rasch	Hummel	OBOS	List: Front: SpareBank 1 Sør-Norge; Back: Arctic Asset Management, NMS Gjenbruk; Sleeves: Intility; Shorts: Kiwi, R Utemiljø; Socks: None
Kristiansund	(Norway) Amund Skiri	(Norway) Dan Peter Ulvestad	Puma	SpareBank 1 Nordmøre	List: Front: NEAS, Lerøy; Back: Slatlem Bil, MOT; Sleeves: Odin Utleie; Shorts: Olivita Kapsler, Alti; Socks: Betonmast
Lillestrøm	(Norway) Hans Erik Ødegaard	(Norway) Ruben Gabrielsen	Puma	Romerike Sparebank	List: Front: Åråsen Eiendom; Back: Oslo Bud & Vare, MOT; Sleeves: Apex Gruppen; Shorts: Åkrene Mek Verksted, AJ Produkter; Socks: Romerikes Blad
Molde	(Norway) Sindre Tjelmeland	(Norway) Emil Breivik	Adidas	Sparebanken Møre	List: Front: Wenaas Workwear; Back: Brunvoll, MOT; Sleeves: Istad; Shorts: BDO Global; Socks: None
Rosenborg	(Iceland) Freyr Alexandersson	(Norway) Jonas Svensson	Adidas	SpareBank 1 SMN	List: Front: Scandic Hotels, Slatlem Bil; Back: Coop Norge, MOT; Sleeves: SalMar; Shorts: Multiconsult, Adresseavisen; Socks: None
Sandefjord	(Sweden) Andreas Tegström	(Norway) Sander Risan Mørk	Macron	Jotun	List: Front: SpareBank 1 Sør-Norge, BDO Global; Back: Harmonie, Fotballstiftelsen; Sleeves: Komplett; Shorts: Color Line; Socks: None
Sarpsborg	(Norway) Even Sel	Captaincy team (Note: Sarpsborg play with a captaincy team who decide between themselves who will be the captain on a game-by-game basis. The full team consists of Sander Christiansen, Anders Hiim, Sigurd Rosted, Sondre Sørli, and Bjørn Inge Utvik.)	Hummel	Borregaard	List: Front: SpareBank 1 Østfold Akershus, Pretec Group; Back: Lions Clubs International; Sleeves: Økonomi-deler; Shorts: CBE Eiendom, Flexi Regnskap; Socks: None
Start	(Norway) Azar Karadas	(Norway) Eirik Schulze	Macron	Sparebanken Norge	List: Front: Obs BYGG, Murisør; Back: Murisør, IK Start Samfunn; Sleeves: Å Energi; Shorts: None; Socks: Recto Solskjerming
Tromsø	(Norway) Jørgen Vik	(Norway) Ruben Yttergård Jenssen	Select	SpareBank 1 Nord-Norge	List: Front: Consto, Harila Bilforhandler; Back: Nordlys, Redd Barna; Sleeves: Arctic Water; Shorts: Extra, C&M Brannsikring; Socks: Kræmer
Viking	(Norway) Bjarte Lunde Aarsheim (Norway) Morten Jensen	(Norway) Zlatko Tripić	Diadora	Lyse	List: Front: OBOS, SpareBank 1 Sør-Norge; Back: Bouvet, Kraft og Kjærlighet; Sleeves: OMV; Shorts: Coop Norge, BDO Global; Socks: Coop Norge
Vålerenga	(Norway) Johannes Moesgaard	(Norway) Ghayas Zahid	Adidas	OBOS	List: Front: Coop Norge, Eidsiva Energi; Back: SpareBank 1 Østlandet, Vålerenga mot rasisme; Sleeves: Elkjøp; Shorts: Coca-Cola, Hurtigruta Carglass; Socks: None

=== Managerial changes ===
Team	Outgoing manager(s)	Manner of departure	Date of vacancy	Position in the table	Incoming manager	Date of appointment
Sarpsborg	(England) Martin Foyston	Contract expired	6 December 2025	Pre-season	(Norway) Even Sel	22 December 2025
Molde	(Norway) Magne Hoseth (Norway) Daniel Berg Hestad (caretakers)	End of caretaker spell	21 December 2025	Pre-season	(Sweden) Martin Falk (caretaker)	21 December 2025
Rosenborg	(Sweden) Alfred Johansson	Sacked	5 May 2026	14th	(Norway) Alexander Tettey (caretaker)	5 May 2026
Vålerenga	(Norway) Geir Bakke	Sacked	6 May 2026	11th	(Norway) Petter Myhre (caretaker)	6 May 2026
KFUM	(Norway) Johannes Moesgaard	Signed by Vålerenga	13 May 2026	12th	(Norway) Thomas Holm (caretaker)	13 May 2026
Vålerenga	(Norway) Petter Myhre (caretaker)	End of caretaker spell	13 May 2026	11th	(Norway) Johannes Moesgaard	13 May 2026
KFUM	(Norway) Thomas Holm (caretaker)	End of caretaker spell	18 May 2026	13th	(Norway) Jørgen Isnes	18 May 2026
Fredrikstad	(Norway) Andreas Hagen	Sacked	18 May 2026	11th	(Denmark) Casper Røjkjær	20 May 2026
Molde	(Sweden) Martin Falk (caretaker)	End of caretaker spell	27 May 2026	5th	(Norway) Sindre Tjelmeland	27 May 2026
Brann	(Iceland) Freyr Alexandersson	Sacked	1 June 2026	11th	(Norway) Eirik Horneland	2 July 2026
Rosenborg	(Norway) Alexander Tettey (caretaker)	End of caretaker spell	17 June 2026	15th	(Iceland) Freyr Alexandersson	17 June 2026

== League table ==
Pos	Team	Pld	W	D	L	GF	GA	GD	Pts	Qualification or relegation
1	Bodø/Glimt (T)	27	21	2	4	67	25	+42	65	Qualification for the Champions League play-off round
2	Viking (T)	27	20	2	5	71	30	+41	62	Qualification for the Champions League second qualifying round
3	Rosenborg	26	14	4	8	53	32	+21	46	Qualification for the Conference League second qualifying round
4	Lillestrøm	26	14	3	9	39	35	+4	45	Qualification for the Conference League second qualifying round
5	Molde	27	13	5	9	66	48	+18	44	
6	Tromsø	27	12	7	8	46	42	+4	43	
7	Brann	26	10	3	13	47	44	+3	33	
8	Vålerenga	27	9	5	13	44	49	−5	32	
9	Sarpsborg	26	8	7	11	32	42	−10	31	
10	KFUM	26	8	7	11	33	46	−13	31	
11	HamKam	27	8	7	12	38	53	−15	31	
12	Fredrikstad	27	8	7	12	31	46	−15	31	
13	Sandefjord	26	7	7	12	31	39	−8	28	
14	Kristiansund	26	7	5	14	30	51	−21	26	Qualification for the relegation play-offs
15	Aalesund	26	5	9	12	45	60	−15	24	Relegation to First Division
16	Start	27	6	4	17	29	60	−31	22	Relegation to First Division

Updated to match(es) played on 21 November 2026. Source: Football Association of Norway (in Norwegian)
Rules for classification: 1) Points; 2) Goal difference; 3) Goals scored; 4) Head-to-head points; 5) Head-to-head goal difference; 6) Head-to-head goals scored.
(T) Qualified, but not yet for the particular phase indicated

== Results ==
Home \ Away	AAL	BOD	BRA	FFK	HAM	KFU	KBK	LSK	MOL	RBK	SAN	S08	STA	TIL	VIK	VIF
Aalesund			2–1	2–3	2–2	2–2	1–1	1–3	2–2		3–4	2–4	2–0	2–6	1–1	5–5
Bodø/Glimt	3–0		3–1	1–0	3–0		3–1	4–0	0–1	4–2	3–2		5–0	5–0	3–2	0–1
Brann		2–1		3–1	3–0	2–1		1–2	3–2	3–2	0–1	1–2	2–1	1–2	0–2	2–3
Fredrikstad		1–2	2–2		2–1	3–1	1–0	0–2		0–3	1–0	1–1	2–1	1–1	1–2	1–1
HamKam	1–1	0–2	1–5	0–0		4–0	2–2	2–0	1–5	0–3		3–0	2–1	1–4	2–1	1–0
KFUM	2–1	0–2			2–2		2–1	1–1	2–4	2–0	1–2	1–0	2–0	0–0	0–2	2–1
Kristiansund	1–4	0–3	3–2	2–0	1–1	2–2			2–1	1–3		0–0	1–2	2–0	1–2	1–0
Lillestrøm	3–2	0–2	3–2	1–4		2–1	1–2		2–2	0–2	3–1	4–0	3–1		1–2	2–0
Molde	1–2	2–4	1–2	5–1	4–1	2–0	1–0	0–1		2–0	2–1	3–3	6–1	3–2		5–1
Rosenborg	2–3	2–2	1–1	4–0	4–0		3–0	2–0			1–1	2–1	4–1	5–3	2–1	0–2
Sandefjord	1–0	0–3	0–0	1–1	2–2	0–1	2–0	0–2	5–5	0–0		0–2	3–0		1–1	
Sarpsborg	2–1	1–1		2–1	1–0	1–3	2–4		2–1	0–3	1–2		0–0	0–1	1–0	2–2
Start	1–1	1–4	2–0	0–1	2–4	4–1		0–1	1–1	0–3	1–0			1–1	0–3	2–0
Tromsø	1–1	0–2	0–5	4–0	3–2	1–1	2–0	0–0	2–0	2–0	3–1	0–0			3–2	4–0
Viking	2–1	5–0	3–2	3–2		5–1	8–1	3–0	4–1	3–0	2–1	2–1	6–3	3–1		
Vålerenga	6–1	1–2	3–1	1–1	0–3	2–2	3–1	0–2	3–4		1–0	3–2	1–2	4–0	0–1	

Updated to match(es) played on 21 November 2026. Source: Football Association of Norway (in Norwegian)
Legend: Blue = home team win; Yellow = draw; Red = away team win.

== Positions by round ==
Team ╲ Round	1	2	3	4	5	6	7	8	9	10	11	12	13	14	15	16	17	18	19	20	21	22	23	24	25	26	27	28	29	30
Bodø/Glimt	8	4	2	5	4	3	5	3	3	3	3	3	3	3	2	2	2	1	1	1	2	2	1	2	2	2	1			
Viking	11	6	3	2	2	2	2	2	1	1	1	1	1	1	1	1	1	2	2	2	1	1	2	1	1	1	2			
Rosenborg	14	16	16	13	13	13	14	12	15	15	15	15	13	10	8	10	9	7	8	6	5	5	5	4	4	3				
Lillestrøm	2	7	4	3	3	4	3	4	4	4	5	5	4	4	4	4	4	5	6	5	6	6	6	6	5	4				
Molde	3	9	11	7	6	5	4	5	5	5	4	4	5	5	5	5	5	4	4	4	4	4	3	3	3	5	5			
Tromsø	1	1	1	1	1	1	1	1	2	2	2	2	2	2	3	3	3	3	3	3	3	3	4	5	6	6	6			
Brann	10	14	9	12	14	14	11	13	10	13	14	14	11	9	10	9	6	6	5	7	7	7	7	9	7	7				
Vålerenga	7	2	5	4	7	11	10	10	8	12	9	9	10	8	7	8	10	11	11	11	12	14	11	10	8	8				
Sarpsborg	8	5	8	10	11	12	13	9	13	8	7	7	7	6	6	6	7	9	9	9	9	9	10	7	9	9				
KFUM	3	8	10	11	12	10	9	11	14	9	11	11	14	13	14	13	12	12	13	14	10	10	9	8	10	10				
HamKam	6	11	13	14	10	7	8	7	7	6	6	6	6	7	9	7	8	10	10	10	13	11	12	12	13	11				
Fredrikstad	16	10	6	6	9	9	12	14	11	11	10	10	9	12	12	11	11	8	7	8	8	8	8	11	11	12				
Sandefjord	12	15	12	8	8	8	7	6	6	7	8	8	8	11	11	12	13	13	12	12	11	12	13	13	12	13				
Kristiansund	5	3	7	9	5	6	6	8	9	10	13	13	15	15	15	15	14	14	14	13	15	15	15	15	15	14				
Aalesund	13	12	15	15	16	16	16	15	12	14	12	12	12	14	13	14	15	15	15	15	14	13	14	14	14	15				
Start	14	13	14	16	15	15	15	16	16	16	16	16	16	16	16	16	16	16	16	16	16	16	16	16	16	16	16			

Leader and Champions League play off round
Champions League second qualifying round
Conference League second qualifying round
Relegation play-offs
Relegation to 2027 Norwegian First Division

Source: nifs.no

== Results by round ==
Team ╲ Round	1	2	3	4	5	6	7	8	9	10	11	12	13	14	15	16	17	18	19	20	21	22	23	24	25	26	27	28	29	30
Aalesund	L	D	L	D	L	D	L	W	W	D	D	L	D	L	D	L	D	D	L	W	L	W	L	W	L	L				
Bodø/Glimt	D	W	W	L	W	W	L	W	W	W	D	L	W	W	W	W	W	W	W	W	W	L	W	W	W	W	W			
Brann	L	L	W	L	L	D	W	L	W	L	L	L	W	W	L	W	W	W	D	L	L	W	L	L	W	D				
Fredrikstad	L	W	W	D	L	L	L	L	W	D	W	L	L	L	L	W	W	W	W	L	D	D	D	L	L	D	D			
HamKam	W	L	L	L	W	W	D	W	L	W	D	L	D	L	L	W	D	L	D	L	L	L	W	L	D	W	D			
KFUM	W	L	L	D	L	W	D	L	L	W	D	D	L	L	L	W	W	D	L	L	W	W	W	D	D	L				
Kristiansund	W	W	L	L	W	D	D	L	L	L	L	D	L	D	L	L	W	L	D	W	L	L	L	L	W	W				
Lillestrøm	W	L	W	W	W	L	W	L	W	L	L	W	W	W	D	L	L	D	L	W	W	L	D	W	W	W				
Molde	W	L	L	W	D	W	W	L	W	L	W	W	D	L	W	D	L	W	W	W	W	L	D	W	L	D	L			
Rosenborg	L	L	L	W	D	D	L	W	L	L	D	W	W	W	W	L	W	W	L	W	W	W	D	W	W	W				
Sandefjord	L	L	W	W	D	L	W	W	L	D	L	L	D	L	L	L	L	W	D	D	L	W	D	L	W	D				
Sarpsborg	D	W	D	L	L	L	L	W	L	W	W	W	W	D	W	D	L	L	D	D	D	L	W	L	L	L				
Start	L	D	D	L	D	L	D	L	L	W	L	W	L	L	W	L	L	L	W	L	W	L	L	L	L	L	W			
Tromsø	W	W	W	W	W	W	D	W	L	D	D	L	W	W	D	W	L	L	D	L	L	W	D	D	L	L	W			
Viking	L	W	W	W	W	W	W	W	W	W	W	W	L	W	D	W	W	L	W	D	W	W	W	W	L	W	L			
Vålerenga	W	W	L	D	L	L	D	L	W	L	W	W	L	W	W	L	L	D	L	D	L	D	L	W	W	L	L			

Source: Football Association of Norway (in Norwegian)
W = Win; D = Draw; L = Loss

== Relegation play-offs ==
The 14th-placed team in Eliteserien will face the winners of the First Division promotion play-offs over two legs to decide who will play in Eliteserien next season.

== Season statistics ==
=== Top scorers ===
As of 22 November 2026

Rank	Player	Club	Goals
1	(Algeria) Amin Chiakha	Rosenborg	19
1	(Denmark) Peter Christiansen	Viking	19
3	(Norway) Kristian Lonebu	Molde	15
4	(Norway) Andreas Helmersen	Bodø/Glimt	14
5	(Norway) Leander Alvheim	Kristiansund	13
6	(Denmark) Lucas Haren	Vålerenga	11
6	(Denmark) Mathias Christensen	Aalesund	11
6	(Norway) Heine Åsen Larsen	Tromsø	11
9	(Norway) Emil Breivik	Molde	10
10	(Norway) Simen Kvia-Egeskog	Viking	9
10	(Norway) Marcus Reed	Aalesund	9
10	(Somalia) Bilal Njie	KFUM	9
10	(Norway) Noah Holm	Brann	9
10	(Iceland) Kristall Máni Ingason	Brann	9

=== Clean sheets ===
As of 21 November 2026

Rank	Player	Club	Clean sheets
1	(Russia) Nikita Haikin	Bodø/Glimt	12
2	(Sweden) Leopold Wahlstedt	Rosenborg	10
3	(Denmark) Jakob Haugaard	Tromsø	9
4	(Sweden) Pontus Dahlberg	Lillestrøm	7
5	(Syria) Elias Hadaya	Sandefjord	6
6	(Norway) Arild Østbø	Viking	5
7	(Norway) Leander Øy	Sarpsborg 08	4
7	(Sweden) Marcus Sandberg	HamKam	4
9	(Norway) Martin Børsheim	Fredrikstad	3
9	(Denmark) Oscar Hedvall	Vålerenga	3
9	(Norway) Emil Ødegaard	KFUM	3
9	(Poland) Albert Posiadała	Molde	3

=== Hat-tricks ===
As of 31 October 2026

Player	For	Against	Result	Date
(Norway) Jens Hjertø-Dahl	Tromsø	Fredrikstad	4–0 (H)	15 March 2026
(Iceland) Kristall Máni Ingason	Brann	Tromsø	5–0 (A)	29 April 2026
(Sweden) Alexander Warneryd	Tromsø	Aalesund	6–2 (A)	2 August 2026
(Republic of Ireland) Trent Koné-Doherty	Molde	HamKam	5–1 (A)	13 September 2026
(Norway) Sander Kilen	Molde	Start	6–1 (H)	18 October 2026
(Norway) Kristian Lonebu^{4}	Molde	Fredrikstad	5–1 (H)	25 October 2026
(Belgium) Evangelos Patoulidis	Sandefjord	Molde	5–5 (H)	8 November 2026

Notes

^{4} Player scored 4 goals
(H) – Home team
(A) – Away team

=== Discipline ===
As of 31 October 2026

==== Player ====
- Most yellow cards: 8
  - (Norway) Kristoffer Askildsen (Viking)
  - (Norway) Zlatko Tripić (Viking)
- Most red cards: 2
  - (Norway) Ousmane Diallo Toure (Start)
  - (South Africa) Samukele Kabini (Molde)
  - (Denmark) Jakob Vester (Sandefjord)

==== Club ====
- Most yellow cards: 54
  - Aalesund
  - Viking
- Fewest yellow cards: 14
  - Bodø/Glimt
- Most red cards: 5
  - KFUM
  - Sandefjord
- Fewest red cards: 0
  - Bodø/Glimt

== Awards ==
=== Monthly awards ===
Month	Coach of the Month		Player of the Month		Young Player of the Month		Goal of the Month		References
Month	Coach	Club	Player	Club	Player	Club	Player	Match	References
March/April	(Norway) Jørgen Vik	Tromsø	(Norway) Ruben Yttergård Jenssen	Tromsø	(Sweden) Alexander Warneryd	Tromsø	(Norway) Markus Karlsbakk	Lillestrøm 3-1 Start	
May	(Norway) Bjarte Lunde Aarsheim (Norway) Morten Jensen	Viking	(Norway) Zlatko Tripić	Viking	(Norway) Tobias Moi	Viking	(Norway) Sebastian Holm Mathisen	Sandefjord 1-0 Aalesund	
July	(Iceland) Freyr Alexandersson	Rosenborg	(Norway) Odin Bjørtuft	Bodø/Glimt	(Algeria) Amin Chiakha	Rosenborg	(Norway) Troy Nyhammer	Tromsø 4-0 Vålerenga	
August			(Norway) Isak Helstad Amundsen	Fredrikstad					

== League attendances ==
Pos	Team	Total	High	Low	Average	Change
1	Brann	144,248	17,500	14,569	16,028	−0.4%
2	Viking	126,069	15,900	15,503	15,759	+14.8%
3	Rosenborg	137,647	21,426	10,246	13,765	−4.7%
4	Vålerenga	125,332	16,556	8,506	12,533	+12.9%
5	Fredrikstad	75,501	10,290	6,885	8,389	−8.5%
6	Lillestrøm	73,322	10,556	5,746	8,147	+31.2%^{1}
7	Start	71,236	14,001	4,694	7,915	+80.3%^{1}
8	Bodø/Glimt	63,831	8,232	5,441	7,092	+3.6%
9	Molde	65,452	9,630	5,112	6,545	+4.4%
10	Sarpsborg 08	49,112	8,022	4,227	5,457	+7.5%
11	Tromsø	46,474	6,027	4,255	5,164	+4.2%
12	Aalesund	54,263	6,735	4,008	4,933	+15.5%^{1}
13	Sandefjord	47,222	6,598	3,485	4,722	−1.9%
14	HamKam	39,495	6,608	2,852	4,388	+10.2%
15	Kristiansund	27,845	3,805	2,708	3,094	−6.0%
16	KFUM	23,147	3,300	1,365	2,315	+6.7%
	League total	1,170,196	21,426	1,365	7,699	+8.1%

Updated to games played on 6 September 2026
Source: nifs.no
Notes:
1: Team played last season in First Division.

== See also ==
- 2026 Norwegian First Division
- 2026 Norwegian Second Division
- 2026 Norwegian Third Division
- 2025–26 Norwegian Football Cup
- 2026–27 Norwegian Football Cup
