= Marius Berntsen Olsen =

Norwegian footballer (born 2001)

Marius Olsen
Personal information
- Full name: Marius Berntsen Olsen
- Date of birth: 14 May 2001 (age 25)
- Height: 1.90 m (6 ft 3 in)
- Position: Centre-back

Team information
- Current team: GKS Katowice
- Number: 14

Youth career
- 2013–2016: Clausenengen
- 2017–2019: Kristiansund

Senior career*
Years	Team	Apps	(Gls)
2020–2022	Levanger	58	(6)
2023–2025	Kristiansund	66	(2)
2026–	GKS Katowice	4	(0)
- * Club domestic league appearances and goals as of 3 August 2026

Marius Berntsen Olsen (born 14 May 2001), commonly known as Marius Olsen, is a Norwegian professional footballer who plays as a centre-back for Ekstraklasa club GKS Katowice.

He previously represented Levanger and Kristiansund in Norway, making 50 appearances in the Eliteserien for the latter.

== Club career ==
=== Early career and Levanger ===
Olsen began playing football for Clausenengen before joining the youth set-up of Kristiansund in 2017. He subsequently represented Kristiansund at under-16, under-19 and reserve-team level.

In 2020, he moved from Kristiansund to Levanger, initially on loan and later on a permanent basis. Over three seasons in the Norwegian Second Division, Olsen made 58 league appearances and scored six goals for Levanger. He played 62 first-team matches for the club when Norwegian Cup appearances are also included.

=== Kristiansund BK ===
Olsen returned to Kristiansund on 29 March 2023, signing a contract through the end of the 2025 season. During his first season back at the club, he made 16 regular-season appearances in the Norwegian First Division and played in all four of Kristiansund's promotion play-off matches. He started both legs of the final against Vålerenga. Kristiansund recovered from a 2–0 first-leg defeat by winning the return match by the same score and secured promotion to the Eliteserien after a penalty shoot-out.

Olsen made 23 Eliteserien appearances in 2024 and a further 27 in 2025. On 4 October 2025, he scored his first Eliteserien goal, heading in the winning goal in a 2–1 home victory over local rivals Molde. By the end of his contract, he had made 81 first-team appearances for Kristiansund in all competitions and scored twice.

=== GKS Katowice ===
After leaving Kristiansund at the end of 2025, Olsen was without a club. In early March 2026, GKS Katowice assessed his fitness and physical condition before deciding to offer him a contract. His signing was announced on 4 March. He joined as a free agent on an initial contract until 30 June 2026, which included an option for two additional years.

He made his GKS and Ekstraklasa debut on 12 April 2026, starting in a 3–3 away draw with Lech Poznań. Olsen made four league appearances before the end of the season, starting each match. On 22 May, GKS activated the extension clause, prolonging his contract by two years, until June 2028.

== Career statistics ==
As of match played 17 May 2026

Appearances and goals by club, season and competition
Club	Season	League			National cup (Note: Includes Norwegian Cup)		Europe		Other		Total	
Club	Season	Division	Apps	Goals	Apps	Goals	Apps	Goals	Apps	Goals	Apps	Goals
Levanger	2020	Norwegian Second Division	9	0	0	0	—		—		9	0
Levanger	2021	Norwegian Second Division	24	2	2	0	—		—		26	2
Levanger	2022	Norwegian Second Division	25	4	2	0	—		—		27	4
Levanger	Total		58	6	4	0	—		—		62	6
Kristiansund	2023	Norwegian First Division	16	1	3	0	—		4 (Note: Appearances in Norwegian First Division promotion play-offs)	0	23	1
Kristiansund	2024	Eliteserien	23	0	3	0	—		—		26	0
Kristiansund	2025	Eliteserien	27	1	4	0	—		—		31	1
Kristiansund	2026	Eliteserien	—		1	0	—		—		1	0
Kristiansund	Total		66	2	11	0	—		4	0	81	0
GKS Katowice	2025–26	Ekstraklasa	4	0	0	0	—		—		4	0
GKS Katowice	2026–27	Ekstraklasa	0	0	0	0	0	0	—		0	0
GKS Katowice	Total		4	0	0	0	0	0	—		4	0
Career total			128	8	15	0	0	0	4	0	147	8
