= Jakob Vester =

Danish footballer (born 2004)

Personal information
- Full name: Jakob Vester Nielsen
- Date of birth: 28 December 2004 (age 21)
- Place of birth: Sevel, Vinderup, Denmark
- Height: 1.81 m (5 ft 11 in)
- Position: Midfielder

Team information
- Current team: Sandefjord
- Number: 37

Youth career
- –2020: FS Holstebro
- 2020–2023: FK Viborg

Senior career*
Years	Team	Apps	(Gls)
2023–2025	Viborg FF	56	(8)
2025–	Sandefjord	15	(1)

International career^{‡}
2023	Denmark U19	1	(0)
2024–2025	Denmark U20	8	(2)
- * Club domestic league appearances and goals as of 19:22, 31 October 2026 (UTC) ‡ National team caps and goals as of 21:12, 8 September 2025 (UTC)

Jakob Vester Nielsen (born 28 December 2004) is a Danish professional footballer who plays as a midfielder for Eliteserien club Sandefjord.

== Career ==
=== Viborg ===
Vester joined Viborg FF from FS Holstebro in the summer 2020. 17-year old Vester made his official first team debut for Viborg FF on 31 August 2022, in a cup match against Viby IF. Around two months later, in early November 2022, Vester extended his deal with Viborg until June 2024. On 12 March 2023, Vester made his official debut in the Danish Superliga when he was in the starting lineup in an unfamiliar position at right back against FC Nordsjælland, which ended 1–1. He made four more appearances until the end of the season. He made four more appearances until the end of the season.

In early July 2023, Vester suffered a crack in the outer bone of his foot, also known as a fatigue fracture, and missed the entire season. Viborg confirmed on 29 September 2023, that Vester had extended his contract until June 2027.

Vester got off to a fast start in the 2024–25 season, scoring four goals in the first five league games of the season.

=== Sandefjord ===
Vester was sold to Norwegian club Sandefjord on 31 December 2025, ending his five-year tenure with Viborg. His purchase by Sandefjord was the biggest transfer fee paid by the club at 4 million Danish kroner. On 7 April 2026, he successfully took a penalty kick to score his first goal for the club. Sandefjord won the game 2–1.

== Career statistics ==
As of match played 31 October 2026

Appearances and goals by club, season and competition
Club	Season	League			Cup (Note: Includes Danish Cup)		Other		Total	
Club	Season	Division	Apps	Goals	Apps	Goals	Apps	Goals	Apps	Goals
Viborg	2022–23	Danish Superliga	5	0	1	0	—		6	0
Viborg	2023–24	Danish Superliga	11	2	0	0	—		11	2
Viborg	2024–25	Danish Superliga	25	4	7	0	—		32	4
Viborg	2025–26	Danish Superliga	15	2	5	0	—		20	2
Viborg	Total		56	8	13	0	0	0	69	8
Sandefjord	2026	Eliteserien	15	1	0	0	0	0	15	1
Career Total			71	9	13	0	0	0	84	9
