= Ousmane Diallo Toure =

Norwegian footballer (born 2003)

Personal information
- Date of birth: 12 March 2003 (age 23)
- Height: 1.78 m (5 ft 10 in)
- Positions: Right-back; wing-back

Team information
- Current team: Start
- Number: 27

Youth career
- 2015–2019: Vålerenga

Senior career*
Years	Team	Apps	(Gls)
2020–2021	Vålerenga 2	30	(3)
2022–2025	Skeid 2	26	(1)
2022–2025	Skeid	67	(5)
2023	→ Træff (loan)	14	(0)
2026–	Start	9	(2)
- * Club domestic league appearances and goals as of 26 May 2026

Ousmane Diallo Toure (born 12 March 2003) is a Norwegian footballer who plays as a right wing-back for IK Start.

== Career ==
Since migrating to Norway from Spain in 2015, Toure played for Vålerenga as a youth player and subsequently a B team player. In the winter of 2022 he moved on to Skeid. He made his B team debut on 12 April 2022, followed by his first-team debut one week later, and also played in the 2022 cup. He therefore received a senior contract in the summer. In 2023 he was loaned out to SK Træff to gain experience.

Toure became a regular player for Skeid, but as the team was relegated to the third tier in 2025, Toure was picked up by IK Start ahead of the 2026 season. He made his Eliteserien debut in March 2026 against Aalesund. As he scored his second goal of the season, a 0–1 goal in an eventual 6–3 loss, Fædrelandsvennen analyzed that Toure stood on the brink of a breakthrough in the 2026 Eliteserien.

== Personal life ==
Toure has stated that "I believe every footballer in Oslo with an African background has experienced racist callouts".
