= Atle Vårvik =

Norwegian speed skater

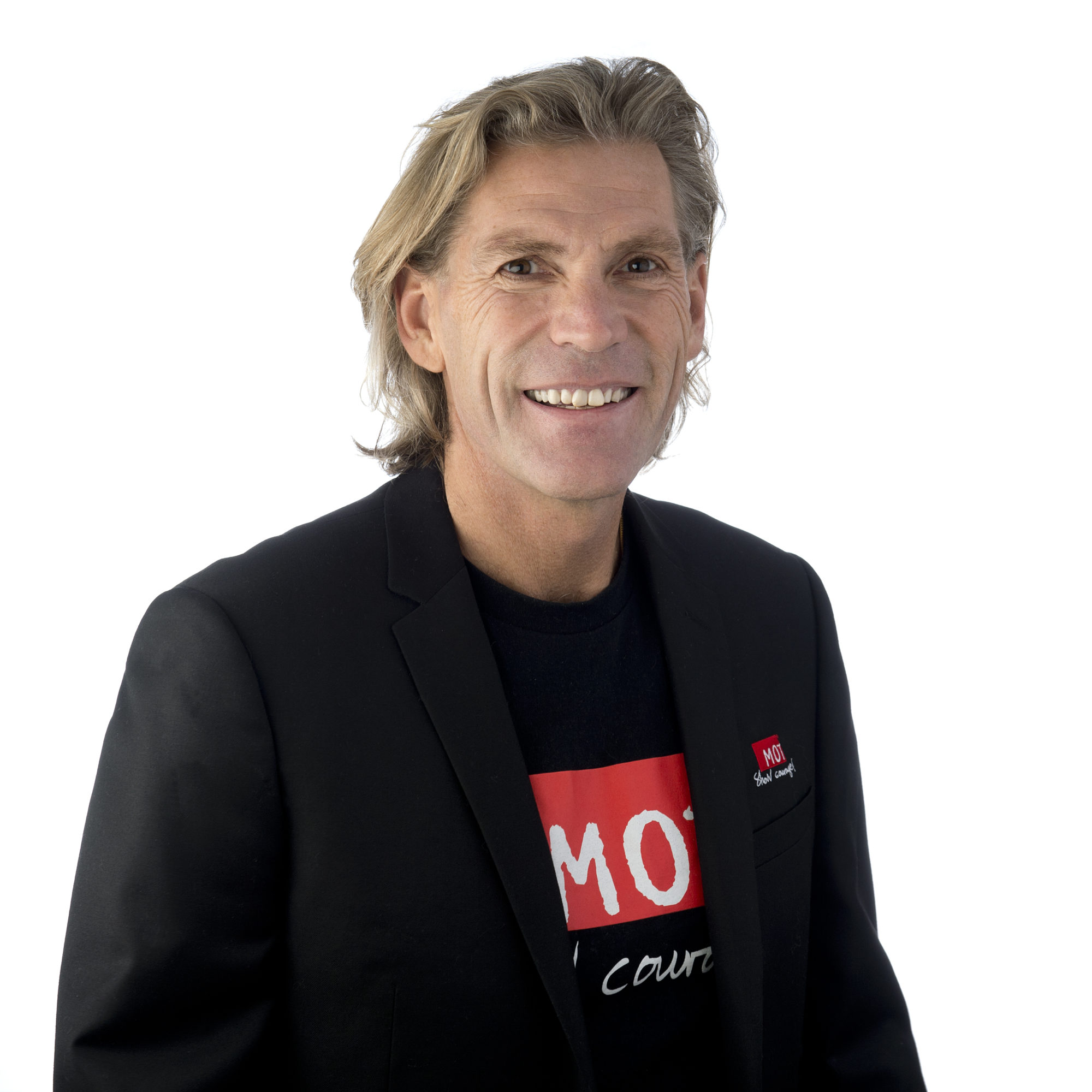
- Born: 12 December 1965; Trondheim, Norway
- Education: Norwegian University of Science and Technology
- Occupations: Social entrepreneur, speaker and mentor
- Known for: Principal founder and creator of MOT; Olympian and former speed skater Aerodynamic speed skating suit
- Spouse: Sigrun Vårvik
- Children: 2
- Parent(s): Kari and Kjell Vårvik

Atle Vårvik (born 12 December 1965) is a social entrepreneur and former speed skater.

Vårvik started MOT in 1994 and has, in the period 1994-2020 created MOT’s concept and brand profile that is today working on strengthening youth’s life, awareness, robustness, and courage on four continents.

Vårvik is a former Norwegian champion, Olympic participant, and one of the world’s best speed skaters. He shocked the entire speed skating world with the aerodynamic “Donald Duck suit”.

With no significant higher education, he is established as an entrepreneur within leader development, as a mentor and coach within business, top athletics, and the public sector.

In 2015, Vårvik received the Honorary Award from the Norwegian Confederation of Sports for his work with MOT, and in 2014, he got one of Norway’s greatest leadership and value awards – the Reitan Group’s “Årets Ladejarl”.

== Biography ==
Atle Vårvik is married to Sigrun, and together they have two sons, Kristian (1992) and Johann (1995).

Vårvik is a social entrepreneur that moves quickly from plan to implementation. He is results- and action-oriented. He creates systems that prevent social problems through strengthening people's values, attitude, quality of life, and feeling of mastery. He has been passionate about life and developing people since he was a young boy. Since 1977, he has been doing research on why crime and why some people ruin their own lives, others' lives, and the society.

Vårvik has a professional background as real estate agent. He also had part in the arrangement of the 1997 Nordic World Ski Championships. He has since leaving the charity MOT in 2020, established the concept “Positive leadership” were the main program was “Courage to lead”.

In 2005, Atle vas a “Minister” in the “P1-Government”. NRK (Norwegian Broadcasting) gathered a representative from each county in Norway, who were nominated by the listeners, and Atle represented the county “Sør-Trøndelag”. The P1-Government made a manifest that was handed over to the Norwegian Government. The manifest looked at Norway 100 years ahead, how Norway would look and what challenges Norway would meet in 100 years and how they could be solved. The vision was: “A courageous Norway – light, playful, and awake”.

== MOT ==
Vårvik had the idea to MOT and was MOT’s principal founder and creator. He is the main architect behind MOT's philosophy, programs, culture, concept, and brand profile, and the organizations MOT Norway and MOT Foundation. Vårvik has been the top leader of MOT in the period 1994-2020.

MOT is about developing youth's robustness and quality of life and about strengthening people's awareness and courage – courage to live, courage to care, and courage to say no. MOT was founded to prevent crime and social society problems.

== Honors and awards ==
In 2015, at Idrettsgallaen, Vårvik received the Honorary Award from the Norwegian Confederation of Sports for his work with MOT (and Johann Olav Koss for Right to Play). The Norwegian prime minister proclaimed the jury’s decision:

The Honorary Award points at role models within top athletics, who use their positions to build good values in society. The jury wants to express its admiration for two ideas showing great generosity and two dreams that have grown into something meaningful, both in Norwegian local communities as well as in conflicted and poor areas of the world. This year's award goes to two persons who have created something unique – something that makes a difference to many, and of what we all may be proud of.

In 2014, Vårvik received one of Norway’s greatest leadership and value awards – the Reitan Group’s value award and the title “Årets Ladejarl”. The jury’s decision:

"Atle Vårvik is passionate about a warmer and safer society. He has put the life of youth in the centre and built MOT’s philosophy on three values: courage to live, courage to care and courage to say no. As leader for MOT, Atle has contributed to inspire, create awareness and strengthen youth’s robustness. Robust youth with courage is useful to the society Atle develops local enthusiasts and ambassadors as commanders to build the brand profile. He has involved well known role models from top athletics, art and culture to achieve results. MOT, as a brand, shall remind youth that they can think themselves robust and dare to care about themselves and others.

Atle Vårvik engages in excellent value-based leadership and work, both nationally and internationally. He proves with MOT the importance of building strong concepts. Atle has had the ability to build a concept that gives people something to believe in. As leader he is a cultural architect with unique communication skills, a great philosophy and scent.

He is skilled at developing people for them to make good decisions and a role model for inspiration and personal responsibility. He has for many years shown the will and energy to implement that has triggered engagement and prevented indifference far beyond Norway’s borders. Atle is a strong identity-builder, culture-builder, director, and strategist. He is also a merchant in that he has created revenue and kept costs down."

== Athlete career ==
Atle Vårvik is a former Norwegian speed skater and top athlete.

Vårvik started his top athlete career when he cycled Den Store Styrkeprøven (The Great Trial of Strength) Trondheim to Oslo 540 km (340 mi) at the age of 13.

He participated in two Olympic Games and has experience from the culture within top athletics.

In 1994, Vårvik launched the special and aerodynamic speedskating suit the “Donald Duck suit”.

“The regulations for speed skating were changed after Atle Vårvik presented his “Donald Duck suit” – a suit that was later tested to have 2/3 of the air resistance compared to the ordinary suits”. Professor Lars Sætran, NTNU (Aftenposten)

=== Best results as speed skater ===
1. World Cup 5000m 93’/94’ – 8th place in the totals
2. World Championship 1988 best Norwegian result
3. Olympic Games 1992
4. Olympiske Games 1994
5. Norwegian Champion 10.000m 1992
6. Norwegian Champion speed skating marathon 1988
7. Norwegian Champion speed skating marathon 1989
8. Norwegian Champion junior 1983

Personal records
| Distance | Time | Date | Place | Field | Race |
|---|---|---|---|---|---|
| 500 m | 39,3 | 13 January 1993 | Hamar | Vikingskipet | Extended club race 1993 |
| 1 000 m | 1.18,6 | 10 January 1993 | Hamar | Vikingskipet | Out of race 1993 |
| 1 500 m | 1.58,7 | 13 January 1993 | Hamar | Vikingskipet | Extended club race 1993 |
| 3 000 m | 4.04,4 | 9 January 1993 | Hamar | Vikingskipet | Out of race 1993 |
| 5 000 m | 6.53,02 | 4 December 1993 | Hamar | Vikingskipet | World Cup nr.2 – 1993/94 |
| 10 000 m | 14.16,89 | 6 December 1993 | Hamar | Vikingskipet | World Cup nr.2 – 1993/94 |

Medal overview
Competed for Trondhjems Skøiteklub (1977/78– )
Single distance - Norwegian Championship
| Gold | Trondheim L 1992 | 10 000m |
| Silver | Hundorp F 1988 | 10 000m |
| Silver | Bergen S 1993 | 10 000m |
| Bronze | Stavanger Sk 1987 | 5 000m |
| Bronze | Trondheim L 1992 | 5 000m |
| Bronze | Stavanger Sk 1987 | 10 000m |
Maraton - Norwegian Championship
| Gold | Oppdal S 1988 | Maraton |
| Gold | Oppdal S 1989 | Maraton |

Overall in the World Cup
| Season | 5 000 m/10 000 m | |
| Season | Place | Points |
|---|---|---|
| 1985/86 | 47 | 0 p |
| 1993/94 | 8 | 70 p |

== Books ==
- The value book «mot til å leve» – 2003 (20.000 books printed/sold)
- The brand book «Sjer dåkk me» – 2004
- “Viljen” – 2004 (co-author)
- “Eventyret MOT” – 2005 (co-author)
- “Inspirasjonen” – 2012
- The MOT philosophy – 2017
- Life and leadership – a different autobiography – 2018
- The Diamond – 2017 and 2019
- “Norske idrettshelter – 25 years anniversary” – 2019
- Courage to live – 2020
