= Alfred Johansson (football manager) =

Swedish football manager (born 1990)

Personal information
- Full name: Erik Alfred Johansson
- Date of birth: 13 September 1990 (age 36)

Managerial career
- Years: Team
- 2023–2026: Rosenborg
- 2026–: Motherwell

Alfred Johansson (born 13 September 1990) is a Swedish football manager who is currently the manager of Scottish Premiership club Motherwell.

== Career ==
=== Copenhagen ===
On 22 July 2019, he was appointed as manager of the Copenhagen under-17s.

On 29 September 2022, he was appointed as manager of the Copenhagen under-19s, after Hjalte Nørregaard was appointed as the new assistant manager of the senior squad.

=== Rosenborg ===
On 14 December 2023, Johansson was appointed as head coach of Rosenborg. He signed a three-year contract lasting through 2026. On 13 August 2025, Johansson signed a three-year contract extension, making his contract with Rosenborg last through 2028. In May 2026, after a string of bad results, Johansson was sacked.

=== Motherwell ===
On 18 June 2026, Scottish Premiership club Motherwell announced that Johansson had been appointed as their new manager.

== Managerial statistics ==
As of match played 21 November 2026

Team	Nat	From	To	Record							
Team	Nat	From	To	G	W	D	L	GF	GA	GD	Win %
Rosenborg	(Norway)	14 December 2023	5 May 2026	83	39	18	26	150	109	+41	46.99
Motherwell	(Scotland)	18 June 2026	Present	21	6	5	10	26	32	−6	28.57
Career total				104	45	23	36	176	141	+35	43.27

== Honours ==
Individual

- Eliteserien Coach of the Month: August 2024, April 2025
