= Troms Kraft =

Norwegian power company

Troms Kraft AS
- Company type: Municipal owned
- Industry: Power
- Founded: 5 December 1997
- Headquarters: Tromsø, Norway
- Key people: Semming Semmingsen (CEO); Inge K. Hansen (Chairman)
- Revenue: ▲NOK 2,650 million (2006)
- Operating income: NOK 285 million (2006)
- Net income: NOK 124 million (2006)
- Number of employees: 433 (2007)
- Parent: Troms County Municipality (60%); City of Tromsø (40%)
- Website: tromskraft.no

Troms Kraft is a power company that operates twelve hydroelectric power plants and the power grid in fifteen municipalities in Troms, Norway. The retail division has 100,000 customers and traded 5 TWh of electricity in 2006, in addition to 40 GWh of district heating. Upon demerger on 1 January 2009, parts of Troms Kraft Marked AS were merged with Ishavskraft AS; Troms Kraft AS owns 50% of Ishavskraft AS. The company operates a fiberoptic broadband service in Tromsø. The company is also planning to construct Fakken windfarm.

Semming Semmingsen has held the role of CEO since June 2012.

== Subsidiaries ==
The subsidiaries of the company, includes Kraft & Kultur AB.

== Court case ==
On 22 November 2011, Troms Kraft announced that discrepancies had been discovered in the accounts of the subsidiary Kraft & Kultur in Sweden of between 1.2 and 1.8 billion Swedish kronor. The case is being investigated by the Swedish Economic Crime Authority (Økokrim) and the former leader of Kraft & Kultur was remanded in custody. In May 2012, an auditor's report concluded that the company's revenues had been inflated by approx. NOK 1.5 billion by means of accounting manipulation.

In September 2013, an investigation report was presented which had taken two years to prepare, which concluded that the loss could have been avoided.
