= Sancheev Manoharan =

Danish football manager (born 1986)

Personal information
- Date of birth: 30 July 1986 (age 40)
- Place of birth: Vejle, Denmark

Managerial career
- Years: Team
- –2011: Firehøje IF (youth)
- 2011–2021: AGF (youth)
- 2022–2023: Haugesund (head of development)
- 2023: Haugesund (caretaker)
- 2024: Haugesund (assistant)
- 2024–2025: Haugesund
- 2025–: Esbjerg

Sancheev Manoharan (born 30 July 1986) is a Danish football manager who is the head coach of Danish 1st Division club Esbjerg fB. He is of Sri Lankan Tamil descent.

== Early life ==
Manoharan was born in Denmark to parents of Sri Lankan Tamil origin who had fled the civil war in 1986 while his mother was pregnant. The family had originally intended to settle in Canada but chose instead to remain in Denmark, where he grew up and received what he later described as a "completely ordinary Danish upbringing".

He first played football with the small local club Firehøje IF between Billund and Vejle, beginning as a central midfielder before moving to left-back. He has openly acknowledged that he did not possess the level required for a professional playing career and instead found his path in coaching, beginning with Firehøje's under-10 team.

== Coaching career ==
In 2011, Manoharan was appointed as a youth manager of Danish side AGF. He managed the club's under-17 and under-19 teams. In 2022, he was appointed head of development of Norwegian side Haugesund. He was described as "responsible for the development of the playing style, transition to the first team and the overall responsibility for the employees at the academy" while working in that role. In 2023, he was appointed caretaker manager of Haugesund. He was awarded October 2023 Eliteserien Manager of the Month. In 2024, he was assistant to Óskar Hrafn Þorvaldsson before Þorvaldsson resigned in the summer and Manoharan was promoted to manager.

In June 2025, he became new manager of Danish 1st Division club Esbjerg fB.

== Personal life ==
Manoharan is of Tamil heritage and was born shortly after his parents fled the Sri Lankan Civil War. As a child and young adult he occasionally encountered difficulties with the pronunciation of his name; while working as a telephone salesman for Canal Digital, he temporarily used the name "Claus" to avoid repeated misunderstandings from customers.

He has spoken about his family and his role as a father, and he has pursued the UEFA Pro Licence as part of his long-term coaching ambitions. During his time at Haugesund, he was compared on a supporter podcast to The Simpsons character Apu Nahasapeemapetilon, a comparison he described as racist and reflective of the challenges faced by ethnic minorities in Scandinavian football.

== Honours ==
Individual

- Eliteserien Coach of the Month: October 2023
