= DeepOcean =

Norwegian subsea services company

- Company type: Privately held company
- Industry: Ocean services
- Founded: 2011
- Headquarters: Oslo, Norway, Norway
- Number of locations: Oslo, Haugesund, Aberdeen, Stavanger, Houston, Texas, Ciudad del Carmen, Takoradi, Sète
- Area served: Global
- Key people: Øyvind Mikaelsen (CEO)
- Services: IMR (Installation, Maintenance & Repair), Subsea Construction, Offshore Renewables, Recycling
- Number of employees: 1537
- Parent: DeepOcean Group Holding AS
- Divisions: DeepOcean Europe, DeepOcean Africa, DeepOcean Americas, DeepOcean APAC, DeepOcean Middle East
- Subsidiaries: Delta Subsea, Searov
- Website: Official website

DeepOcean is an Oslo, Norway - based company which provides subsea services to the global offshore industries such as Inspection Maintenance and Repair (IMR), Subsea Construction, Cable Lay, and Subsea Trenching. Its 1,537 employees project manage and operate a fleet of Vessels, ROV's and subsea Trenchers.

DeepOcean operates mostly in the Oil & Gas and Offshore Renewables industries globally, with offices located around the world.

== History ==
DeepOcean AS was established in 1999.

DeepOcean Group Holding (DeepOcean) was established in May 2011.

In 2012, DeepOcean AS, Trico Offshore Ltd, and CTC Marine Projects Ltd. merged to form DeepOcean.

In late 2016, Triton, a private equity investment company, became the largest shareholder of DeepOcean. The Triton funds invest in medium-sized businesses headquartered in Northern Europe, Italy and Spain.

In April 2022, it was announced that DeepOcean had acquired the Norwegian engineering and technology company, Installit AS and its subsidiaries.

May 2025, DeepOcean has acquired Shelf Subsea, an independent provider of subsea services with a strong position in the eastern hemisphere.

== Services ==
DeepOcean offers the following three main service lines: (i) Inspection, Maintenance and Repair (IMR) and subsea construction, (ii) Seabed Intervention (incl. trenching), and (iii) Cable Installation, servicing the Global Offshore Energy industry from inception to decommissioning.

== Offices worldwide ==
- Mexico
- Norway
- United States of America
- Ghana
- United Kingdom
- France
- Ghana
- Australia
- Singapore
- Papua New Guinea
- Indonesia
- India
- Malaysia
- Saudi Arabia

== Organisation ==
DeepOcean has a Supervisory Board of Directors as well as an Executive Management Team who oversee the daily management of DeepOcean's activities.

Board of Directors:

- Jo Lunder, Chairman of the Board
- Terje Askvig, Board member
- Kristian Diesen, Board member
- Marc van der Plas, Board member
- Mike Winkel, Board member
- Colette Cohen, Board member

Executive Management:

- Øyvind Mikaelsen, CEO
- Frode Garlid, CFO
- Ottar K Mæland, COO
- Matthias Jungwirth, CCO
