= SpareBank 1 Østlandet =

Norwegian savings bank

Sparebank 1 Østlandet

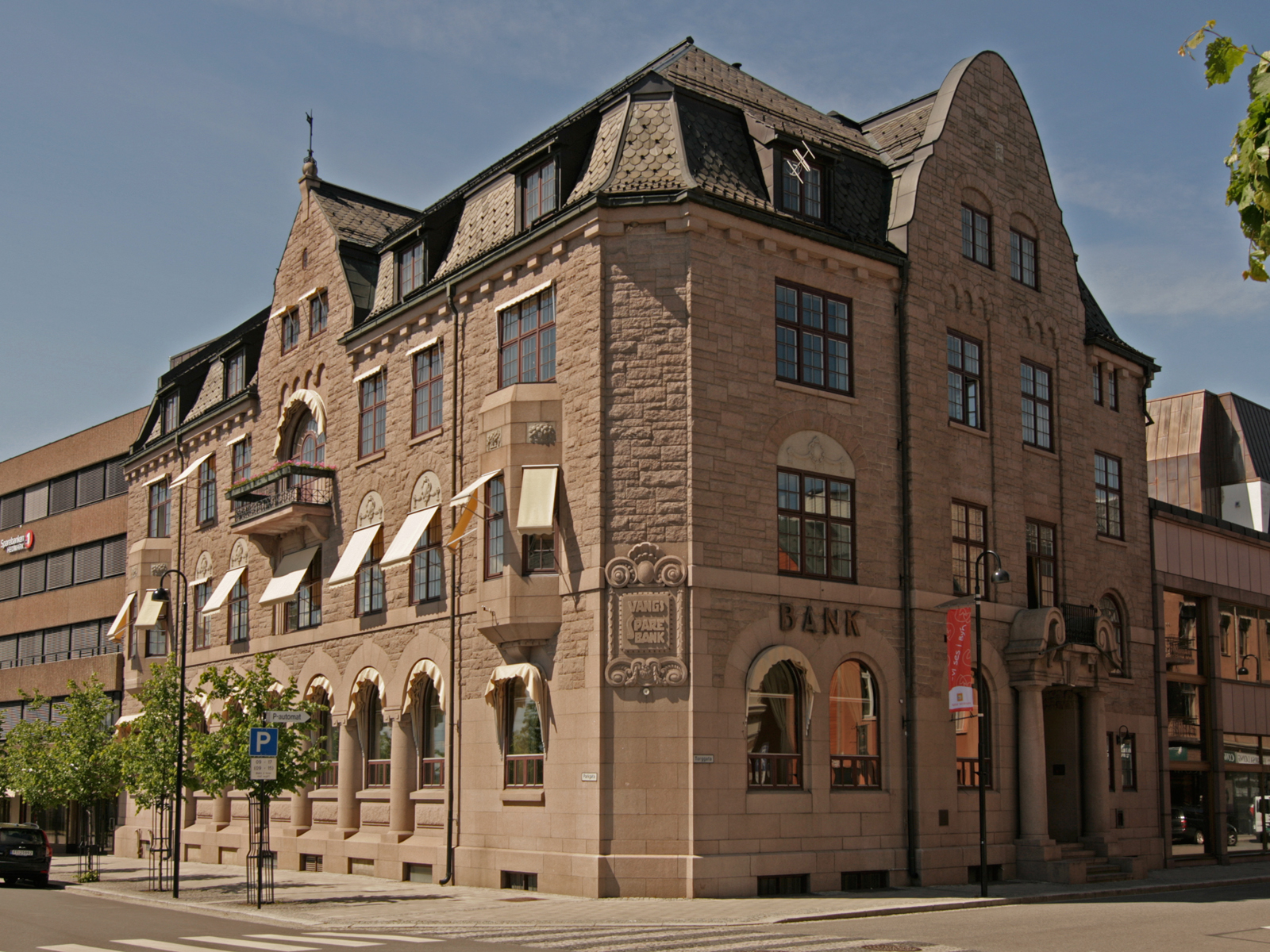
- Company type: Savings bank
- Industry: Banking
- Predecessors: Sparebanken Hedmark (1845–2017); Bank 1 Oslo Akershus (1898–2017)
- Founded: 1845
- Headquarters: Hamar, Norway
- Area served: Oslo; Innlandet; Viken
- Key people: Richard Heiberg (CEO)
- Number of employees: 1119 (2019)
- Website: www.sb1ostlandet.no

SpareBank 1 Østlandet (OSE: SPOL), formerly Sparebanken Hedmark and Bank 1 Oslo Akershus, is the fourth largest Norwegian savings bank and is based in eastern Norway. The bank´s major market is in the counties of Innlandet, Oslo and Viken. The company head office is situated in Hamar, and the bank has 37 branches in its market area. SpareBank 1 Østlandet is part of the SpareBank 1 alliance.

SpareBank 1 Østlandet´s equity certificate was listed at Oslo Stock Exchange at the 13th of June 2017 with the ticker SPOL.

SpareBank 1 Østlandet was the first Norwegian bank to share its profit by paying customer dividends.

Member of the alliance SpareBank 1 holding 12,4 % ownership of Sparebank 1 Gruppen AS, 2019.

Subsidiaries:

- Estate agency (EiendomsMegler 1 Innlandet AS)
- Estate agency (EiendomsMegler 1 Oslo Akershus AS)
- Leasing and asset financing (SpareBank 1 Finans Østlandet AS)
- Accounting and consultancy chain (TheVIT AS)

== History ==
The bank has its roots back to 1845, and today's modern bank is a result of several mergers of local savings banks through the history. The last found place in 2017 when Bank 1 Oslo Akershus AS was merged in.
