= SpareBank 1 Sør-Norge =

Norwegian savings bank

SpareBank 1 Sør-Norge ASA
- Company type: Savings bank
- Industry: Banking
- Predecessors: SpareBank 1 SR-Bank (1976–2024); SpareBank 1 Sørøst-Norge (2021–2024)
- Founded: 1 October 2024
- Headquarters: Stavanger, Norway
- Area served: Norway
- Key people: Benedicte Schilbred Fasmer - CEO
- Number of employees: 2300
- Website: www.sb1sornorge.no

SpareBank 1 Sør-Norge (OSE: SB1NO), formerly SpareBank 1 SR-Bank and SpareBank 1 Sørøst-Norge, is a Norwegian bank and lender with 36 offices from Bergen in the west to Oslo in the east, with head office located in Stavanger. As of 2019, the bank has more than 1,250 employees with its subsidiaries.

SpareBank 1 Sør-Norge is a financial group with national distribution and is Norway's second largest Norwegian-owned bank. In 2018 the bank went from being a regional bank to a bank for the whole Southern Norway.

SpareBank 1 Sør-Norge is part of the SpareBank 1 Alliance, which is a banking and product alliance between independent, locally based Norwegian banks.

As of October 1, 2024 SpareBank 1 SR-Bank and SpareBank 1 Sørøst-Norge merged as SpareBank 1 Sør-Norge.

== History ==
Sparebanken Rogaland was created in 1976 when 22 local savings banks in Rogaland merged to form Norway's first regional bank. Since then an additional 17 banks have jointed the company. In 1996 the bank was one of the founding members of SpareBank 1 and presently owns 19.5%.

== Sponsorships ==
Viking Stadion is called SR-Bank Arena for sponsorship purposes.
