= Craft Sportswear =

Swedish sportswear brand

Craft Sportswear (previously known as Craft of Scandinavia) is a Swedish producer of functional sports apparel. The company is based in Borås, an old and traditional textile industry town in the South of Sweden. The initial concept of its founder Anders Bengtsson was to develop underwear that propels moisture away from the skin during physical activity. Craft started with technical base layers and soon developed the three-layer principle with a second layer of insulation and moisture transportation as well as an outer shell for protection. Today, the company offers gear for many sports, it specializes in layer three for running, triathlon, bike and cross-country skiing.

== History ==
In 1973, Swede Anders Bengtsson started developing a base layer material that transports moisture (sweat) away from the skin. Bengtsson tested his designs by weighing his gear after exercise sessions. He used polyester fibers, which only absorb a minimum amount of moisture, and worked them into a weaving construction. The resulting capillary action further promotes moisture expulsion transporting sweat from the skin to the outer surface of the garment where it quickly evaporates. The brand Craft of Sweden was officially founded in 1977. In addition to technical baselayers, the company soon started producing second layer garments (focused on fleece material) and outerwear.

== Company takeovers ==
New Wave Group acquired the brand in 1996.

=== Critics ===
Craft is sometimes criticized for having its clothes produced in low-wage countries. This is where the production of fabrics and clothing takes place.
