= Amund Skiri =

Norwegian footballer (born 1978)

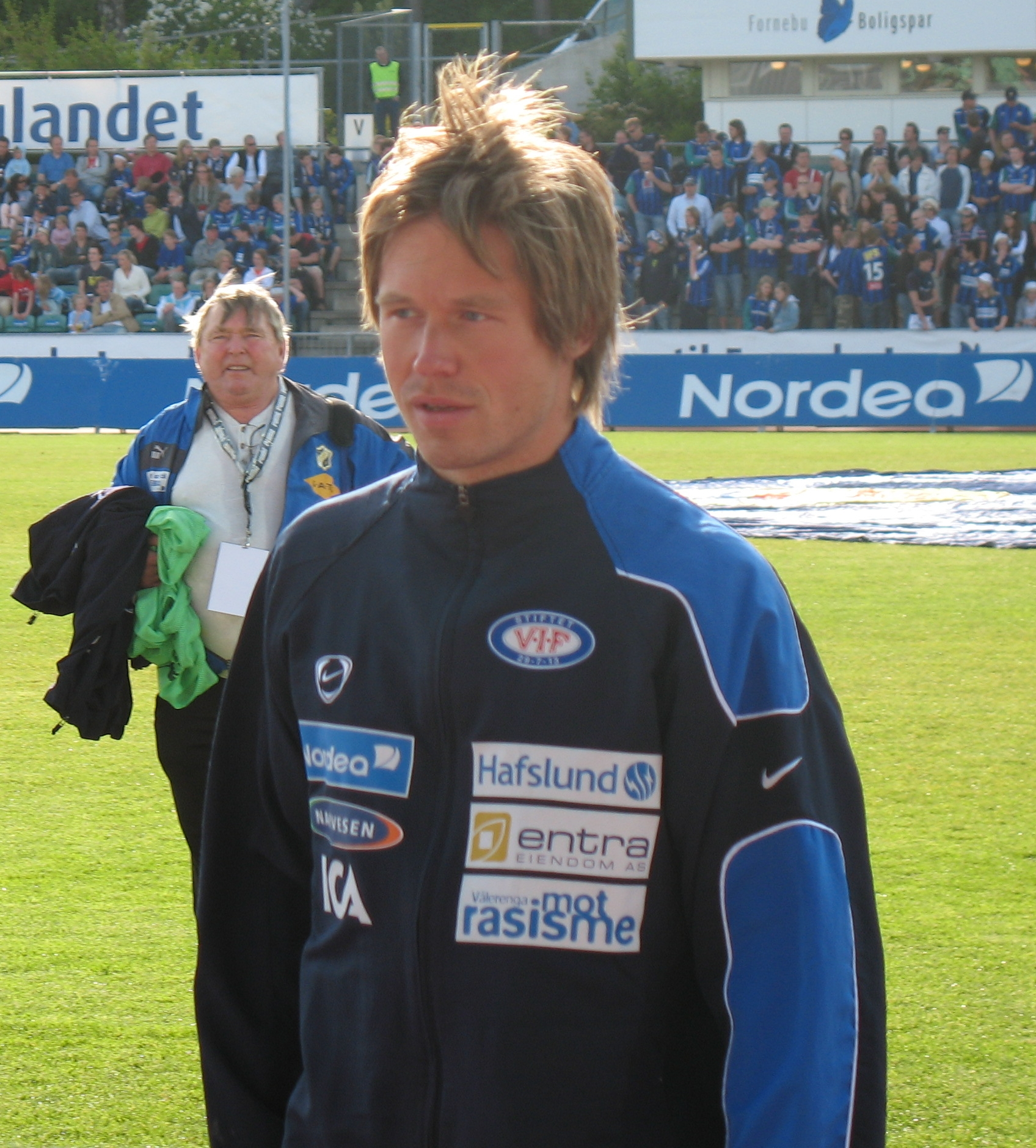

Personal information
- Full name: Amund Robertsen Skiri
- Date of birth: 25 February 1978 (age 48)
- Place of birth: Åndalsnes, Norway
- Height: 1.78 m (5 ft 10 in)
- Position: Defender

Team information
- Current team: Kristiansund (manager)

Youth career
- Åndalsnes IF

Senior career*
Years	Team	Apps	(Gls)
2001–2004	Aalesund	113	(13)
2005–2006	Vålerenga	25	(0)
2006–2012	Aalesund	118	(10)
2013–2016	Herd	25	(4)

Managerial career
- 2013–2016: Herd
- 2017–2018: Vålerenga (assistant)
- 2019–2023: Aalesund 2
- 2023–: Kristiansund
- * Club domestic league appearances and goals

Amund Robertsen Skiri (born 25 February 1978) is a Norwegian football coach and a former player who is the manager of Kristiansund. He's known for putting away the deciding penalty kick in the Norwegian cup final in 2009, giving Aalesund the victory and the medal. On 1 January 2017 he became assistant coach for Vålerenga. On 23 May 2026, Skiri signed a three-year contract extension with the club until 2029.

== Career statistics ==
Season	Club	Division	League		Cup		Total	
Season	Club	Division	Apps	Goals	Apps	Goals	Apps	Goals
2001	Aalesund	Adeccoligaen	30	3	0	0	30	3
2002	Aalesund	Adeccoligaen	29	5	4	0	33	5
2003	Aalesund	Tippeligaen	26	1	4	2	30	3
2004	Aalesund	Adeccoligaen	28	4	0	0	28	4
2005	Vålerenga	Tippeligaen	18	0	5	0	23	0
2006	Vålerenga	Tippeligaen	7	0	5	3	29	6
2006	Aalesund	Adeccoligaen	14	2	3	0	17	2
2007	Aalesund	Tippeligaen	25	4	3	1	28	5
2008	Aalesund	Tippeligaen	17	1	2	0	19	1
2009	Aalesund	Tippeligaen	25	2	6	0	31	2
2010	Aalesund	Tippeligaen	19	0	1	1	20	1
2011	Aalesund	Tippeligaen	8	1	4	0	12	1
2012	Aalesund	Tippeligaen	10	0	2	0	12	0
2013	Herd	3. divisjon	22	4	1	0	23	4
2014	Herd	2. divisjon	3	0	0	0	3	0
Career Total			281	27	40	7	321	34

== Managerial statistics ==
As of match played 22 November 2026

Managerial record by team and tenure
Team	From	To	Record					Ref.
Team	From	To	P	W	D	L	Win %	Ref.
Aalesund 2	1 January 2019	13 June 2023	72	38	15	19	52.78	
Kristiansund	26 August 2023	present	115	42	27	46	36.52	
Total			187	80	42	65	42.78	—

== Honours ==
Individual

- Norwegian First Division Coach of the Month: October 2023
