= Jørgen Isnes =

Norwegian footballer and manager (born 1979)

Personal information
- Date of birth: 30 August 1979 (age 47)
- Place of birth: Oslo, Norway
- Height: 1.88 m (6 ft 2 in)
- Position: Centre-back

Team information
- Current team: KFUM Oslo (head coach)

Senior career*
Years	Team	Apps	(Gls)
1997–2003	Skeid	58	(1)
2003	→ Manglerud Star (loan)	12	(1)
2004–2012	Lørenskog		

Managerial career
- 2009–2012: Lørenskog (player-coach)
- 2013–2014: Lørenskog
- 2015–2016: KFUM (assistant)
- 2016–2022: KFUM
- 2023–2025: Strømsgodset
- 2026–: KFUM
- * Club domestic league appearances and goals

Jørgen Isnes (born 30 August 1979) is a Norwegian professional football manager and former player who is the current head coach of KFUM Oslo.

== Playing career ==
Isnes began his senior career at Skeid and made his debut in the Eliteserien for Skeid away against Molde in July 1997. The following seasons, Isnes played for Skeid in the Eliteserien until 2003 when he went on loan to Manglerud Star. Before the 2004 season, he transferred to Lørenskog in the Norwegian Second Division where he later became captain. In 2009, he became a player-manager and he retired after the 2012 season.

== Coaching career ==
=== Lørenskog ===
Isnes was a player-coach Lørenskog for several seasons and continued as a coach after his retirement and remained at the club until 2014.

=== KFUM-Kameratene ===
In 2015, Isnes was appointed as an assistant coach for KFUM Oslo and after two seasons as an assistant coach he became head coach in 2016, despite interest from other clubs. Prior to his appointment as head coach, the team had been relegated from the first division.

In his first season as head coach, Isnes led his team to a 7th-place finish in the second division and the following season led his team a 2nd-place finish and a qualification for the first division. After wins over Fredrikstad and Åsane, the team were promoted to the first division.

In 2019, Isnes led the team to a 4th-place finish in the first division and were allowed to play for a qualification to the Eliteserien but lost to Start. After his success with KFUM, Isnes became a sought after coach for several Eliteserien clubs and was linked to become the coach of Odd.

Isnes continued at KFUM and after finishing 8th in 2020, it was a 5th-place finish that gave a new opportunity to be promoted to the Eliteserien in 2021. After knocking out Sogndal and Fredrikstad, a match against Jerv which went to a penalty shootout saw KFUM's opportunity for promotion lost. Isnes later rejected both Sarpsborg and Hamarkameratene who were looking for a new head coach. He also turned down an assistant coach role in Molde, instead preferring to continue at KFUM.

=== Strømsgodset ===
On 14 December 2022, Isnes was hired to become head coach of Eliteserien club Strømsgodset, his first coaching role in the Eliteserien. His first Eliteserien game in charge was a 1–0 victory over Aalesund.

In late May 2025 after a bad start to the season with only two out of eight wins, Isnes was fired.

=== Return to KFUM Oslo ===
In May 2026, over three years after leaving KFUM Oslo, the club announced that they had hired Isnes again, on a contract lasting until the end of 2029.

== Personal life ==
Isnes has been a supporter of Liverpool F.C. since he was a child and has named Jürgen Klopp as an inspiration to him.

== Managerial statistics ==
As of match played 22 November 2026

Team	Nat	From	To	Record					Ref.
Team	Nat	From	To	P	W	D	L	Win %	Ref.
Strømsgodset	(Norway)	1 January 2023	26 May 2025	78	32	11	35	41.03	
KFUM Oslo	(Norway)	18 May 2026	present	20	8	5	7	40.00	
Total				98	40	16	42	40.8	—

== Honours ==
Individual

- Norwegian First Division Coach of the Month: August 2022
