= Andreas Hagen (footballer) =

Norwegian footballer (born 1986)

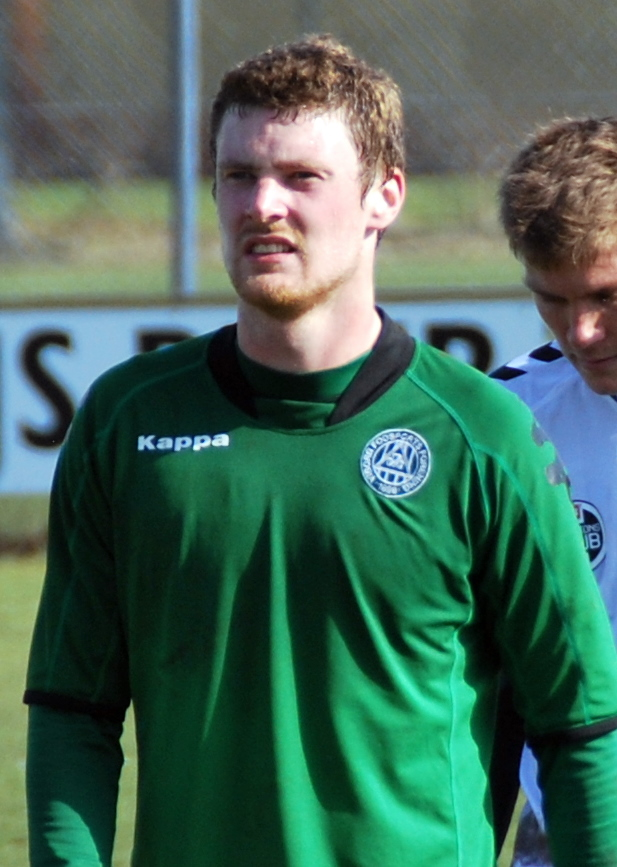
- Hagen in 2012 with Viborg

Personal information
- Date of birth: 16 February 1986 (age 40)
- Place of birth: Oslo, Norway
- Height: 1.86 m (6 ft 1 in)
- Position: Midfielder

Team information
- Current team: Lech Poznań (assistant)

Youth career
- Korsvoll
- Lyn
- Skeid

Senior career*
Years	Team	Apps	(Gls)
2004–2007	Skeid	22	(0)
2007	Jerv		
2008	Korsvoll		
2009–2012	Jerv		
2012–2014	Viborg	9	(0)
2014–2018	Jerv	115	(16)
2019	Fredrikstad	23	(3)

International career
2004	Norway U18	1	(0)

Managerial career
- 2024–2026: Fredrikstad
- * Club domestic league appearances and goals

Andreas Hagen (born 16 February 1986) is a Norwegian professional football manager and former player who is currently the assistant manager of Ekstraklasa club Lech Poznań.

== Playing career ==
Having had three spells in the Grimstad-based club FK Jerv, Hagen played in the 2013–14 Danish Superliga for Viborg FF. He was originally lured to Jerv by friend Knut Ugland.

Hagen was also capped once for Norway on youth level.

== Coaching career ==
Hagen became assistant manager of FK Jerv, and then Fredrikstad FK. When Mikkjal Thomassen was bought out by AIK in the summer of 2024, Hagen was promoted to caretaker manager. Shortly after advancing to the semi-final of the 2024 Norwegian Football Cup, the job was given to Hagen on a permanent basis. He left Fredrikstad in May 2026.

On 29 June 2026, Hagen was announced as an assistant coach to Niels Frederiksen at Ekstraklasa club Lech Poznań.

== Personal life ==
He is married to Kelsey Hood, an American soccer player who first played in Norway for FK Donn in 2010, then Amazon Grimstad from 2014 to 2022 interspersed with season-long stays in Vålerenga (2016) and Fredrikstad (2019). In 2023 Hood played for Sarpsborg 08.

== Managerial statistics ==
As of match played 16 May 2026

Managerial record by team and tenure
Team	From	To	Record					Ref.
Team	From	To	P	W	D	L	Win %	Ref.
Fredrikstad	15 July 2024	18 May 2026	69	30	15	24	43.48	
Total			69	30	15	24	43.48	—

== Honours ==
=== Managerial ===
Fredrikstad

- Norwegian Cup: 2024
