= Nordmøre Energiverk =

Power company based in Kristiansund, Norway

Nordmøre Energiverk AS
- Company type: Private
- Industry: Power
- Founded: 1991
- Headquarters: Kristiansund, Norway
- Area served: Nordmøre
- Key people: Knut J.Hansen (CEO); Dagfinn Ripnes (Chairman)
- Number of employees: 130 (2019)
- Website: neas.mr.no

Nordmøre Energiverk is a power company based in the town of Kristiansund in Møre og Romsdal county, Norway. The company operates hydroelectric power plants and the power grid in the municipalities of Aure, Averøy, Kristiansund, Smøla and Tingvoll. Along with the municipalities, TrønderEnergi owns 49% of the company. The company also operates fiberoptic broadband in the region.

== History ==
The company was created in 1991 after the merger of Nordmøre Interkommunale Kraftlag, Aure og Stemshaug Kraftlag, Averøya Kraftlag, Freiøya Kraftlag, Kristiansund Elektrisitetsverk, Smøla Kraftlag, Tingvoll Kommunale Kraftlag and Tustna Kraftlag. TrønderEnergi bought part of the company in 2001.
