= Lerøy =

Norwegian seafood company

Lerøy Seafood Group ASA
- Type: Allmennaksjeselskap
- Traded as: OSE: LSG
- Industry: Seafood
- Headquarters: Bergen, Norway, Bergen, Norway
- Area served: Global
- Key people: Henning Beltestad
- Products: Fish and Seafood
- Number of employees: 2000
- Website: www.leroy.no www.leroyseafood.com www.lsg.no

Lerøy Seafood Group ASA is a seafood production and distribution company based in Bergen, Norway

The company started operation in the 19th century when the fisherman Ole Mikkel Lerøen started selling fish and other seafood on the fish market of Bergen. In 1939 the primary subsidiary Hallvar Lærøy AS was founded. Until 1997 the company was family owned, when it became a public company resulting in the listing on Oslo Stock Exchange in 2002.

The company started exporting salmon in 1973 and gradually became dominant among Norway's salmon exporters.

In 2011, the company was named Norway's 12th largest exporting company.

As of 2012, the company was the second largest salmon and trout farming company in the world, and involved in fish farms in Hitra, Kristiansund, Troms, and Scotland (Shetland).
