= Eidsiva Energi =

Norwegian energy and ISP company

Eidsiva Energi AS

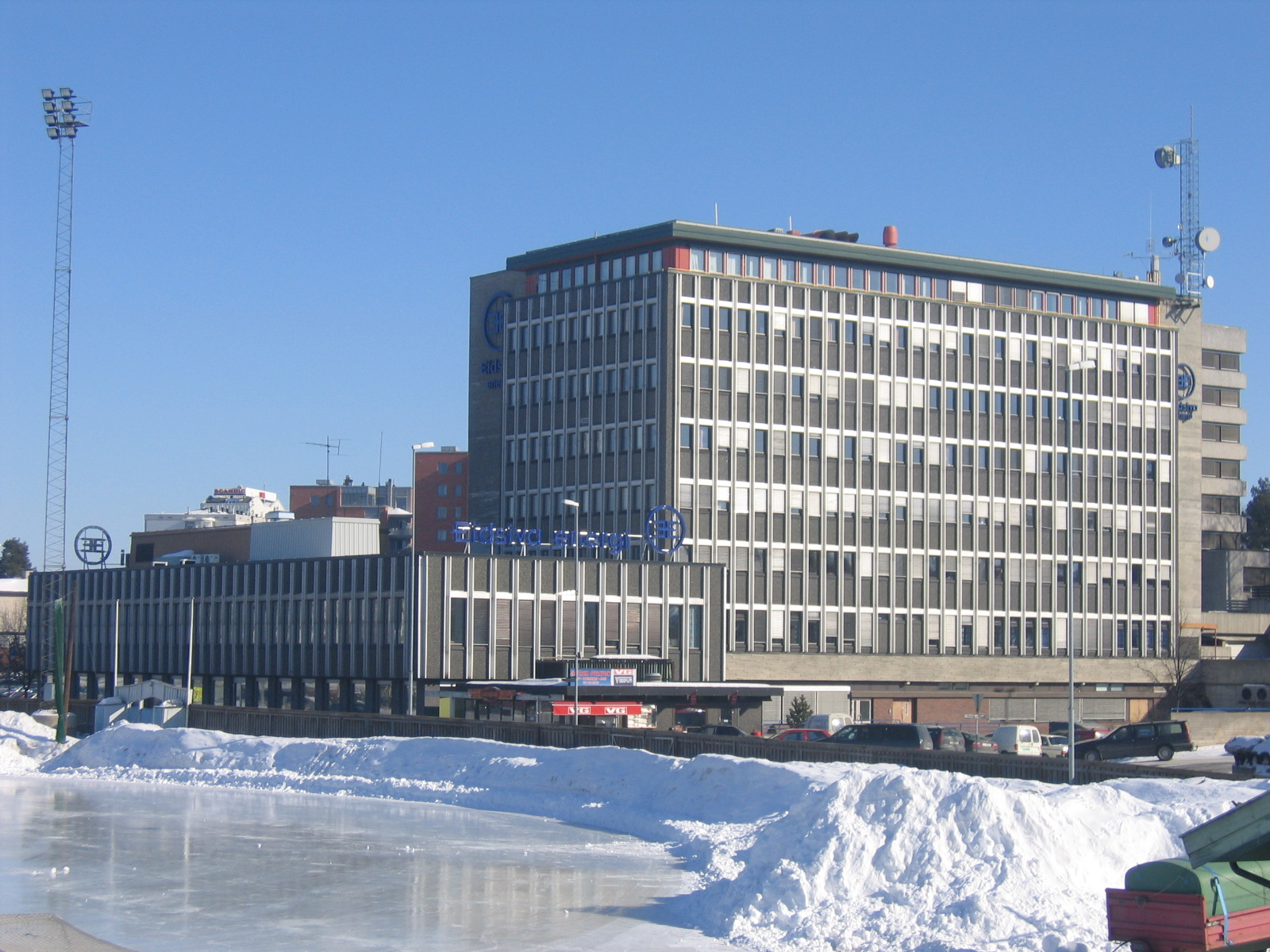
- Corporate headquarters in Hamar
- Type: Municipally owned
- Industry: Energy
- Founded: 2000
- Headquarters: Hamar, Norway
- Area served: Hedmark; Oppland
- Key people: Øistein Andresen (CEO); Pål Egil Rønn (chair)
- Products: Hydroelectricity
- Revenue: ▲NOK 3,500 million (2006)
- Number of employees: 1,000 (2007)
- Website: www.eidsiva.no

Eidsiva Energi is a Norwegian energy company based in Hamar with large sections of Hedmark and Oppland counties as its core market. The company is the largest producer, distributor, and trader of electricity in the county. The corporation had a revenue of 3.5 billion kr and market capitalization of 9 billion kr in 2006. It is owned by Hedmark County as well as by 25 municipalities. In 2019, it became a subsidiary of Hafslund.

The corporation is decentralised and has ten division offices in the two counties, while the head office is located in downtown Hamar, while the customer centre is located in Kongsvinger. It has 163,000 power- and grid customers as well as an electricity production of 3.2 terawatt-hours (12 PJ), all hydroelectricity, from 20 wholly owned and 24 partially owned power plants. It also operates 20,000 kilometers of power grid including 10,000 net stations and transformers. It also holds a 39.6% stake in Moelven Industrier.

== History ==
The company was established in July 2000 when Lillehammer og Gausdal Energiverk and Hamar-regionen Energiverk merged their respective grid- and trade divisions. On June 6, 2001 Eidsiva Energi and Hedmark Energi merged their grid- and trade divisions. On April 15, 2004 the three lower companies merged and thus creating one large corporation called Eidsiva energi Holding AS that included industrial investments and energy production. On April 28, 2005 the company bought Mjøskraft and Mjøskraft Strøm from Hafslund and changed its name to Eidsiva Energi AS in December. In September 2006 it took over the power plants from Vannkraft Øst and Oppland Energi.
