= MOT (charity) =

- Formation: 1994 in Norway
- Founder: Atle Vårvik
- Type: Non-governmental and non-profit national organizations - independent both religiously and politically
- Purpose: Humanitarian movement preventing social problems as exclusion, bullying, violence, substance use, crime, and mental problems
- Region served: Norway, South Africa, Denmark, Thailand, Latvia, Minnesota
- Products: One life skills concept, three values, and five MOT programmes in schools and communities
- Methods: Promote youth's robustness and quality of life, and safe class environments where all are included

MOT's life skills concept has five programmes which are offered to schools and municipalities on four continents – Europe, Africa, Asia and America.

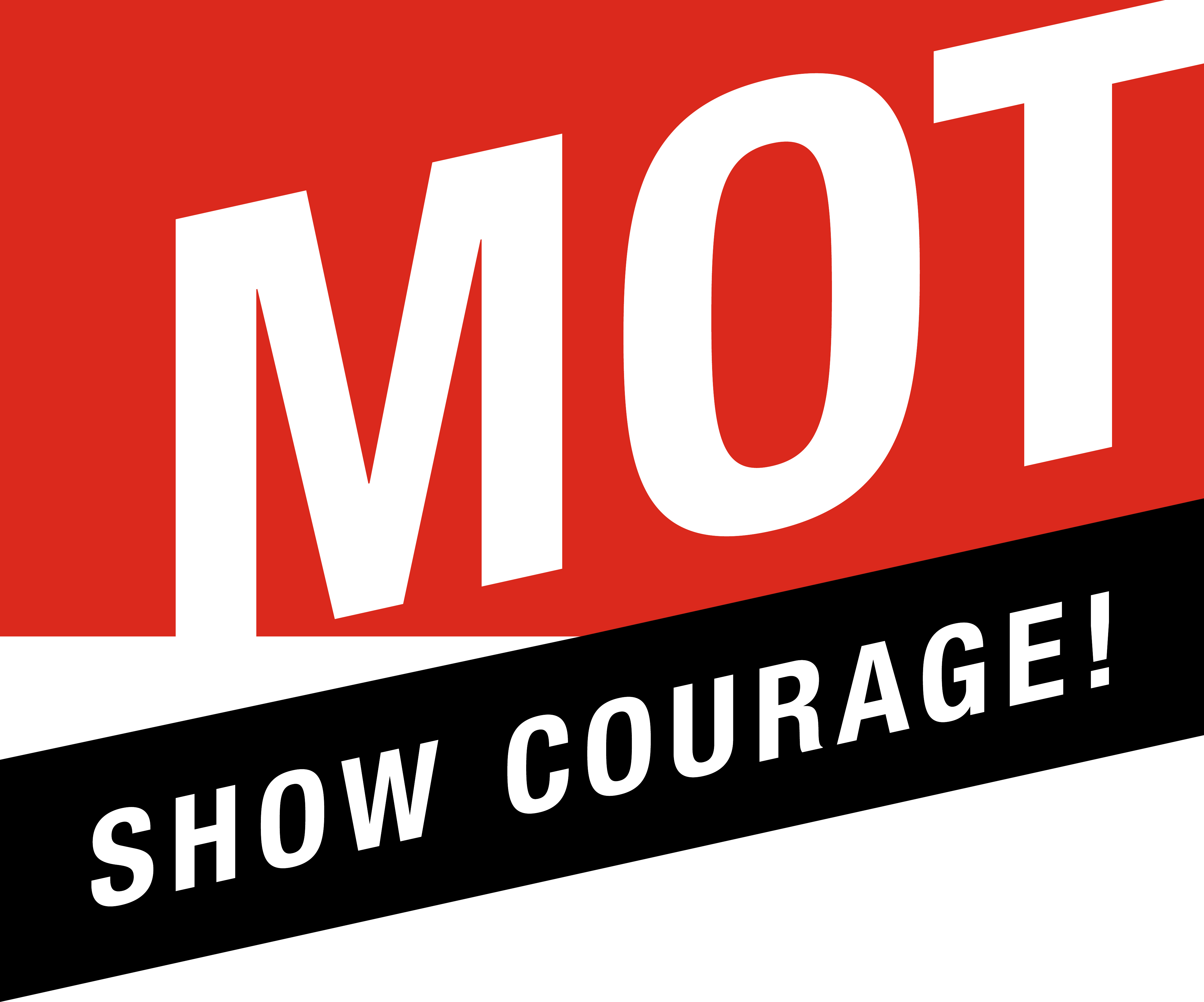
MOT Show Courage logo

MOT
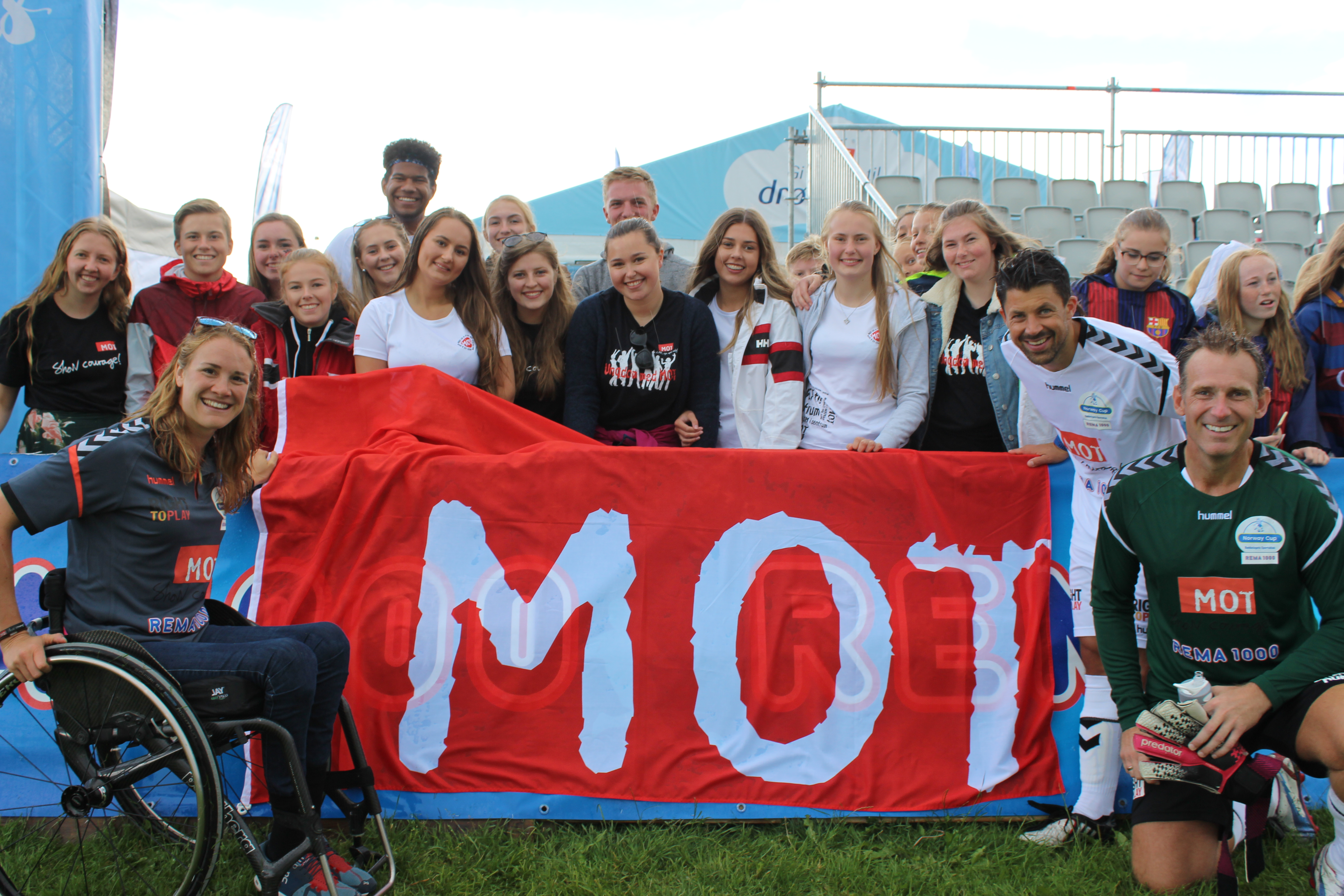
- Inventor: Atle Vårvik
- Inception: 13 April 1994
- Website: http://www.mot.global

MOT originates from Norway. The initiative to start MOT was taken by the former Olympians and Norwegian speedskaters Atle Vårvik and Johann Olav Koss after the Olympic Winter Games in 1994. MOT was founded to prevent crime and social society problems.

MOT's life skills concept is founded on the purpose to create a safer society through strengthening youth's robustness, awareness, and courage – the courage to live, courage to care, and courage to say no. The MOT Concept is offered to schools, municipalities, and countries on a partnership premise.

MOT is operating in five countries: Norway, South Africa, Denmark, Thailand, and Latvia.
