= Istad =

Norwegian power company

Istad AS
- Company type: Municipal owned
- Industry: Power
- Founded: 1918
- Headquarters: Oslo, Norway
- Area served: Norway
- Key people: (CEO); Torgeir Dahl (Chairman)
- Revenue: ▲885 million kr (2006)
- Operating income: 91 million kr (2006)
- Net income: 32 million kr (2006)
- Number of employees: 404 (2007)
- Website: istad.no

Istad AS is a power company based in the town of Molde in Møre og Romsdal county, Norway. The company owns the power grid in the municipalities of Aukra, Eide, Fræna, Gjemnes, Midsund, and Molde. It also operates a fiberoptic broadband in Molde. The company owns a 25% stake in the power plants on the river Driva.

The company dates back to 1918, and got the present corporate structure in 1981. It is owned by Trondheim Energi (subsidiary of Statkraft, 49%), Molde Municipality (34%), and Moldekraft (17%).
