= Bouvet ASA =

- Company type: Allmennaksjeselskap
- Traded as: OSE: BOUVET
- Industry: IT consulting
- Founded: 1995
- Headquarters: Oslo, Norway

Bouvet ASA is a Norwegian IT consulting company, headquartered in Oslo, Norway.

The company is the result of a merger between Mandator AS and Cell Network AS in 2001 with Cell Network as the acquiring company. The company changed its name to Bouvet in 2007.
