= 2020 Norwegian First Division =

1. divisjon
- Season: 2020
- Dates: 3 July – 13 December
- Champions: Tromsø
- Promoted: Tromsø; Lillestrøm
- Relegated: Kongsvinger; Øygarden
- Matches: 240
- Goals: 781 (3.25 per match)
- Top goalscorer: Henrik Udahl (19 goals)
- Biggest home win: KFUM Oslo 6–0 Øygarden (7 December 2020)
- Biggest away win: Ull/Kisa 0–7 Tromsø (29 September 2020)
- Highest scoring: Stjørdals-Blink 5–4 Sandnes Ulf (14 September 2020); Tromsø 5–4 Åsane (3 October 2020); Raufoss 5–4 KFUM Oslo (13 December 2020)
- Longest winning run: 8 games Tromsø
- Longest unbeaten run: 14 games Lillestrøm
- Longest winless run: 10 games HamKam
- Longest losing run: 6 games Kongsvinger

The 2020 1. divisjon (referred to as OBOS-ligaen for sponsorship reasons) was a Norwegian second-tier football league season.

== Teams ==
In the 2019 1. divisjon, Aalesund, Sandefjord and Start were promoted to the 2020 Eliteserien, while Notodden, Skeid and Tromsdalen were relegated to the 2020 2. divisjon.

Lillestrøm, Tromsø and Ranheim were relegated from the 2019 Eliteserien, while Stjørdals-Blink, Grorud and Åsane were promoted from the 2019 2. divisjon.

Locations of the teams in the 2020 1. divisjon

=== Stadia and personnel ===
Team	Location	Arena	Capacity	Manager
Åsane	Bergen	Myrdal gress	2,180	(Norway) Morten Røssland
Grorud	Oslo	Grorud Matchbane	1,700	(Norway) Eirik Kjønø
HamKam	Hamar	Briskeby Arena	7,800	(Norway) Kjetil Rekdal
Jerv	Grimstad	Levermyr Stadion	3,300	(Norway) Arne Sandstø
KFUM Oslo	Oslo	KFUM Arena	1,500	(Norway) Jørgen Isnes
Kongsvinger	Kongsvinger	Gjemselund Stadion	5,824	(Norway) Espen Nystuen (interim)
Lillestrøm	Lillestrøm	Åråsen Stadion	11,500	(Norway) Geir Bakke
Øygarden^{1}	Ågotnes	Ågotnes Stadion	1,200	(Norway) Mons Ivar Mjelde
Ranheim	Trondheim	Extra Arena	3,000	(Norway) Svein Maalen
Raufoss	Raufoss	Nammo Stadion	1,800	(Norway) Christian Johnsen
Sandnes Ulf	Sandnes	Øster Hus Arena	6,046	(Norway) Steffen Landro
Sogndal	Sogndalsfjøra	Fosshaugane Campus	5,622	(Norway) Eirik Bakke
Stjørdals-Blink	Stjørdalshalsen	M.U.S Stadion	2,000	(Norway) Roar Vikvang
Strømmen	Strømmen	Strømmen Stadion	2,000	(Norway) Ole Martin Nesselquist
Tromsø	Tromsø	Alfheim Stadion	6,687	(Norway) Gaute Helstrup
Ull/Kisa	Jessheim	Jessheim Stadion	4,500	(Norway) Trond Fredriksen

- ^{1} Ahead of the season, Nest-Sotra changed its name to Øygarden.

=== Managerial changes ===
Team	Outgoing manager	Manner of departure	Date of vacancy	Table	Incoming manager	Date of appointment	Table
Sandnes Ulf	(Norway) Bengt Sæternes	Contract expired	31 December 2019	Pre-season	(Norway) Steffen Landro	13 November 2019	Pre-season
Øygarden	(Norway) Steffen Landro	Signed by Sandnes Ulf	13 November 2019	Pre-season	(United States) Bryant Lazaro (Note: Lazaro was initially appointed as assistant coach in December 2019, but was appointed as head coach on 17 February 2020.)	17 February 2020	Pre-season
Kongsvinger	(Portugal) Vítor Gazimba	Mutual consent	11 December 2019	Pre-season	(Finland) Mika Lehkosuo	18 December 2019	Pre-season
Lillestrøm	(Norway) Tom Nordlie	Contract expired	11 December 2019	Pre-season	(Norway) Geir Bakke	1 January 2020	Pre-season
Tromsø	(Finland) Simo Valakari	Mutual consent	20 April 2020	Pre-season	(Norway) Gaute Helstrup	20 May 2020	Pre-season
HamKam	(Norway) Gaute Helstrup	Signed by Tromsø	19 May 2020	Pre-season	(Norway) Espen Olsen	21 May 2020	Pre-season
HamKam	(Norway) Espen Olsen	Structural changes	7 August 2020	16th	(Norway) Geir Frigård (interim)	7 August 2020	16th
HamKam	(Norway) Geir Frigård (interim)	End of caretaker spell	15 August 2020	16th	(Norway) Kjetil Rekdal	15 August 2020	16th
Øygarden	(United States) Bryant Lazaro	Mutual consent	18 September 2020	14th	(Norway) Mons Ivar Mjelde	18 September 2020	14th
Kongsvinger	(Finland) Mika Lehkosuo	Structural changes	30 September 2020	16th	(Norway) Espen Nystuen (interim)	30 September 2020	16th

== League table ==
Pos	Team	Pld	W	D	L	GF	GA	GD	Pts	Promotion, qualification or relegation
1	Tromsø (C, P)	30	19	6	5	60	29	+31	63	Promotion to Eliteserien
2	Lillestrøm (P)	30	16	9	5	49	26	+23	57	Promotion to Eliteserien
3	Sogndal	30	15	6	9	57	36	+21	51	Qualification for the promotion play-offs
4	Ranheim	30	13	8	9	61	41	+20	47	Qualification for the promotion play-offs
5	Åsane	30	12	9	9	60	48	+12	45	Qualification for the promotion play-offs
6	Raufoss	30	11	10	9	53	44	+9	42 (Note: Raufoss were deducted 1 point.)	Qualification for the promotion play-offs
7	Sandnes Ulf	30	11	8	11	46	55	−9	41	
8	KFUM Oslo	30	10	9	11	44	44	0	39	
9	HamKam	30	10	9	11	49	52	−3	39	
10	Strømmen	30	10	8	12	47	51	−4	35 (Note: Strømmen were deducted 3 points.)	
11	Jerv	30	9	8	13	41	57	−16	35	
12	Ull/Kisa	30	10	5	15	45	63	−18	35	
13	Grorud	30	9	7	14	45	56	−11	34	
14	Stjørdals-Blink (O)	30	8	9	13	52	59	−7	33	Qualification for the relegation play-offs
15	Kongsvinger (R)	30	6	10	14	35	53	−18	28	Relegation to Second Division
16	Øygarden (R)	30	6	9	15	37	67	−30	27	Relegation to Second Division

Source: NFF, Soccerway
Rules for classification: 1) Points; 2) Goal difference; 3) Goals scored; 4) Head-to-head points; 5) Head-to-head goal difference; 6) Head-to-head away goals scored (only if between two teams); 7) Head-to-head goals scored; 8) Play-off (only used to decide champions or relegation).
(C) Champions; (O) Play-off winners; (P) Promoted; (R) Relegated

== Positions by round ==
Team ╲ Round	1	2	3	4	5	6	7	8	9	10	11	12	13	14	15	16	17	18	19	20	21	22	23	24	25	26	27	28	29	30
Tromsø	8	4	2	1	1	1	1	1	1	1	1	1	1	1	1	1	1	1	1	1	1	1	1	1	1	1	1	1	1	1
Lillestrøm	7	3	3	4	8	9	10	10	10	10	7	6	5	5	4	4	4	3	3	2	2	2	2	2	2	2	2	2	2	2
Sogndal	2	1	4	6	10	7	3	3	3	3	3	3	3	3	2	2	2	2	2	3	3	3	3	3	3	3	3	3	3	3
Ranheim	5	2	1	2	2	2	2	2	2	2	2	2	2	2	3	3	3	4	4	4	4	4	4	4	4	4	4	4	4	4
Åsane	14	9	12	9	6	5	4	4	4	4	4	5	6	6	5	5	5	5	5	5	5	5	5	5	5	5	5	5	5	5
Raufoss	15	10	13	13	9	11	12	12	12	12	12	13	11	10	9	9	8	8	8	10	8	10	8	7	8	10	8	7	7	6
Sandnes Ulf	3	5	6	3	3	4	5	5	5	5	6	4	4	4	6	6	7	7	6	6	6	8	10	10	7	7	6	6	6	7
KFUM Oslo	6	6	5	5	4	3	9	9	9	9	10	10	9	9	11	12	13	11	11	9	9	9	6	6	6	6	7	8	8	8
HamKam	10	15	15	15	15	16	16	16	16	16	16	16	16	16	16	16	15	14	13	12	12	11	12	11	11	9	9	9	9	9
Strømmen	16	16	16	16	16	14	14	14	14	14	15	15	13	14	13	11	12	12	12	14	14	13	11	13	14	14	14	11	10	10
Jerv	12	11	14	10	7	6	6	6	6	6	8	9	10	11	12	10	10	10	10	7	7	6	7	8	9	7	10	10	12	11
Ull/Kisa	1	7	7	11	12	12	11	11	11	11	11	12	14	12	10	13	11	13	14	13	13	12	13	12	13	13	12	12	11	12
Grorud	13	12	9	8	11	10	8	8	8	8	5	7	7	7	8	8	9	9	9	11	11	14	14	14	12	12	13	14	13	13
Stjørdals-Blink	11	13	8	7	5	8	7	7	7	7	9	8	8	8	7	7	6	6	7	8	10	7	9	9	10	11	11	12	14	14
Kongsvinger	4	8	11	14	14	15	13	13	13	13	14	11	12	13	15	15	16	16	16	16	16	15	15	15	16	16	16	16	16	15
Øygarden	9	14	10	12	13	13	15	15	15	15	13	14	15	15	14	14	14	15	15	15	15	16	16	16	15	15	15	15	15	16

Promotion to Eliteserien
Promotion play-offs
Relegation play-offs
Relegation to 2. divisjon

Source: nifs.no

== Results ==
Home \ Away	GRO	HAM	JER	KFU	KIL	LIL	RAN	RAU	ULF	SOG	STJ	SIF	TRO	ULL	ÅSA	ØYG
Grorud	—	1–2	0–3	3–0	4–0	0–1	0–2	1–6	1–1	3–1	1–1	2–1	2–0	3–1	1–4	4–3
HamKam	1–1	—	2–3	2–2	2–3	1–1	3–4	0–1	2–0	2–1	2–2	1–1	0–2	3–1	2–1	3–4
Jerv	2–0	3–2	—	0–1	1–1	2–2	1–6	4–2	2–2	0–3	1–1	1–0	1–0	2–1	0–2	4–2
KFUM Oslo	3–1	1–1	2–1	—	1–1	1–2	1–1	2–1	1–0	4–1	0–1	1–2	1–1	3–0	0–0	6–0
Kongsvinger	0–1	1–2	1–1	1–2	—	0–3	1–0	3–3	1–1	0–0	3–2	2–1	0–2	3–0	2–4	1–1
Lillestrøm	1–1	2–0	1–0	2–0	2–0	—	3–1	2–2	4–2	0–2	0–1	1–0	3–0	2–2	1–1	3–0
Ranheim	5–3	1–1	5–0	0–1	3–2	1–1	—	3–0	1–1	1–0	2–2	5–1	1–2	2–3	3–1	6–1
Raufoss	2–2	0–2	1–1	5–4	2–0	2–0	0–0	—	0–0	2–1	3–1	1–1	1–1	1–1	3–1	1–2
Sandnes Ulf	3–1	1–2	3–1	3–1	1–0	1–1	2–1	2–1	—	2–1	4–1	2–2	0–3	2–1	1–1	4–3
Sogndal	2–1	4–2	1–0	3–0	5–2	0–1	4–0	1–0	0–2	—	3–2	3–0	1–1	6–1	2–2	2–0
Stjørdals-Blink	2–3	0–1	2–2	4–1	5–2	1–4	2–3	0–2	5–4	2–2	—	2–1	4–2	1–2	2–2	0–0
Strømmen	2–1	3–0	5–2	2–1	0–0	1–4	1–1	3–2	4–0	1–1	1–1	—	1–4	3–1	0–3	2–2
Tromsø	3–1	3–1	1–0	1–1	1–0	0–1	3–0	1–0	5–0	2–2	4–2	1–0	—	2–1	5–4	1–0
Ull/Kisa	2–1	2–2	2–2	1–1	0–2	1–0	1–0	1–4	3–0	2–0	2–1	4–0	0–7	—	0–3	6–1
Åsane	1–1	2–2	5–1	1–1	2–2	3–1	0–3	0–1	4–1	1–4	2–1	1–4	0–1	4–2	—	3–1
Øygarden	1–1	1–3	1–0	3–1	1–1	0–0	0–0	4–4	2–1	0–1	0–1	1–4	1–1	2–1	0–2	—

Source: NIFS (in Norwegian), Football Federation of Norway (in Norwegian)
Legend: Blue = home team win; Yellow = draw; Red = away team win.

== Play-offs ==
=== Promotion play-offs ===
The 3rd to 6th placed teams took part in the promotion play-offs; these were single leg knockout matches. In the first round, the 5th placed team played at home against the 6th placed team. The winner of the first round then met the 4th placed team on away ground in the second round. The winner of the second round then met the 3rd placed team on away ground. The winner of the third round advanced to play the 14th placed team in Eliteserien on neutral ground in the Eliteserien play-offs for a spot in the top-flight next season.

=== Relegation play-offs ===
The 14th-placed team took part in a two-legged play-off against the winners of the 2. divisjon play-offs to decide who would play in the 2021 1. divisjon.

17 December 2020
18:00 CET (UTC+1)

Stjørdals-Blink	3–0	Asker
Jones 22' (o.g.); Stokke 74'; Rødahl 86'	Report

M.U.S Stadion Sandskogan, Stjørdalshalsen
Attendance: 300
Referee: Marius Lien
20 December 2020
12:30 CET (UTC+1)

Asker	1–3	Stjørdals-Blink
Kastrati 12'	Report	Bransdal 43'; Bjørnholm-Jatta 58'; Rolstad 89'

Føyka Stadion, Asker
Attendance: 200
Referee: Christian Moen

Stjørdals-Blink won 6–1 on aggregate.

== Season statistics ==
=== Top scorers ===
Rank	Player	Club	Goals
1	(Norway) Henrik Udahl	Åsane	19
2	(Norway) Kristoffer Hoven	Sogndal	17
3	(Norway) Mats Lillebo	Stjørdals-Blink	16
4	(Norway) Oscar Aga	Grorud	15
5	(Norway) Magnus Grødem	Sandnes Ulf	14
5	(Norway) Kent Håvard Eriksen	Sandnes Ulf	14
7	(Norway) Erik Tønne	Ranheim	13
8	(Norway) Håkon Lorentzen	Åsane	11
8	(Norway) Kent-Are Antonsen	Tromsø	11
8	(Norway) Eric Kitolano	Tromsø	11

== Awards ==
=== Monthly awards ===
Month	Player of the Month		References
Month	Coach	Club	References
July	(Costa Rica) Diego Campos	Jerv	
August	(Norway) Erik Tønne	Ranheim	
September	(Norway) Emil Breivik	Raufoss	
October	(Finland) Kaan Kairinen	Lillestrøm	
November	(Nigeria) Ifeanyi Mathew	Lillestrøm	

=== Annual awards ===
Award	Winner	Club
Coach of the Year	(Norway) Morten Røssland	Åsane
Player of the Year	(Norway) Sivert Mannsverk	Sogndal
Breakthrough of the Year	(Norway) Henrik Udahl	Åsane
