= 2019 Norwegian First Division =

1. divisjon
- Season: 2019
- Dates: 30 March – 9 November
- Champions: Aalesund
- Promoted: Aalesund; Sandefjord
- Relegated: Notodden; Skeid; Tromsdalen
- Matches: 240
- Goals: 722 (3.01 per match)
- Top goalscorer: Pontus Engblom (19 goals)
- Biggest home win: KFUM Oslo 5–0 Jerv (5 May 2019); Aalesund 5–0 Tromsdalen (16 May 2019)
- Biggest away win: Tromsdalen 0–8 Ull/Kisa (14 April 2019)
- Highest scoring: Raufoss 6–4 Tromsdalen (2 June 2019)
- Longest winning run: 9 games Aalesund
- Longest unbeaten run: 18 games Aalesund
- Longest winless run: 16 games Tromsdalen
- Longest losing run: 7 games Tromsdalen
- Highest attendance: 7,150; Start 3–2 Jerv (16 May 2019)
- Lowest attendance: 50; Tromsdalen 0–1 Aalesund (20 October 2019); Tromsdalen 3–0 Raufoss (2 November 2019)
- Average attendance: 1,434 ▼15.5%

The 2019 1. divisjon (referred to as OBOS-ligaen for sponsorship reasons) was a Norwegian second-tier football league season.

Aalesund set a new record for most points in a 1. divisjon season with 79. They surpassed IK Start's previous record of 74 points, from the 2004 season.

== Season summary ==
On 20 October, Aalesund secured both promotion and league title with three games to spare by winning 1–0 away over Tromsdalen. The same day, Tromsdalen were the first team to be relegated as their defeat coincided with a victory for Strømmen. On 2 November, Sandefjord secured promotion to the first tier with one match to spare after their 1–0 win over Jerv at Komplett Arena. On the same day, Skeid were the second team to be relegated as their draw against Notodden meant that survival was out of reach before the ultimate round.

== Teams ==
In the 2018 1. divisjon, Viking and Mjøndalen were promoted to the 2019 Eliteserien, while Åsane, Florø and Levanger were relegated to the 2019 2. divisjon.

Start and Sandefjord were relegated from the 2018 Eliteserien, while Raufoss, Skeid and KFUM Oslo were promoted from the 2018 2. divisjon.

Locations of the teams in the 2019 1. divisjon

=== Stadia and personnel ===
Team	Location	Arena	Capacity	Manager
Aalesund	Ålesund	Color Line Stadion	10,778	(Norway) Lars Bohinen
HamKam	Hamar	Briskeby Arena	7,800	(Norway) Gaute Helstrup
Jerv	Grimstad	Levermyr Stadion	3,300	(Norway) Arne Sandstø
KFUM Oslo	Oslo	KFUM Arena	1,500	(Norway) Jørgen Isnes
Kongsvinger	Kongsvinger	Gjemselund Stadion	5,824	(Portugal) Vítor Gazimba
Nest-Sotra	Sotra	Ågotnes Stadion	1,200	(Norway) Steffen Landro
Notodden	Notodden	Idrettsparken	4,000	(Norway) Kenneth Dokken
Raufoss	Raufoss	Nammo Stadion	1,800	(Norway) Christian Johnsen
Sandefjord	Sandefjord	Komplett Arena	6,582	(Spain) Martí Cifuentes
Sandnes Ulf	Sandnes	Sandnes Stadion	4,969	(Norway) Bengt Sæternes
Skeid	Oslo	Nordre Åsen^{1}	2,000	(Norway) Tom Nordlie
Sogndal	Sogndalsfjøra	Fosshaugane Campus	5,622	(Norway) Eirik Bakke
Start	Kristiansand	Sør Arena	14,448	(Iceland) Jóhannes Harðarson
Strømmen	Strømmen	Strømmen Stadion^{2}	1,850	(Norway) Ole Martin Nesselquist
Tromsdalen	Tromsdalen	TUIL Arena	1,695	(England) Jonathan Hill
Ull/Kisa	Jessheim	Jessheim Stadion	3,500	(Norway) Trond Fredriksen

- ^{1}Skeid played their home games at Intility Arena from 25 May 2019.
- ^{2}Strømmen played their last home game at Jessheim Stadion due to nonapproved floodlights at Strømmen Stadion.

=== Managerial changes ===
Team	Outgoing manager	Manner of departure	Date of vacancy	Table	Incoming manager	Date of appointment	Table
HamKam	(Norway) Kevin Knappen	Contract expired	11 November 2018	Pre-season	(Norway) Gaute Helstrup	29 November 2018	Pre-season
Strømmen	(Norway) Espen Olsen	Contract expired	11 November 2018	Pre-season	(Norway) Ole Martin Nesselquist	29 November 2018	Pre-season
Ull/Kisa	(Norway) Vegard Skogheim	Contract expired	11 November 2018	Pre-season	(Norway) Trond Fredriksen	7 December 2018	Pre-season
Kongsvinger	(England) Mark Dempsey	Resigned	13 November 2018	Pre-season	(Portugal) Vítor Gazimba	16 January 2019	Pre-season
Tromsdalen	(Norway) Gaute Helstrup	Signed by HamKam	29 November 2018	Pre-season	(England) Jonathan Hill	10 January 2019	Pre-season
Start	(Norway) Kjetil Rekdal	Mutual agreement	2 April 2019	15th	(Iceland) Jóhannes Harðarson (Note: Harðarson was initially appointed as caretaker on 3 April 2019, and as interim head coach for the rest of the season on 10 July 2019. Harðarson was appointed as permanent head coach on 23 October 2019.)	3 April 2019	15th

== League table ==
Pos	Team	Pld	W	D	L	GF	GA	GD	Pts	Promotion, qualification or relegation
1	Aalesund (C, P)	30	25	4	1	67	25	+42	79	Promotion to Eliteserien
2	Sandefjord (P)	30	19	8	3	53	30	+23	65	Promotion to Eliteserien
3	Start (O, P)	30	19	5	6	54	31	+23	62	Qualification for the promotion play-offs
4	KFUM Oslo	30	13	9	8	58	42	+16	48	Qualification for the promotion play-offs
5	Kongsvinger	30	14	4	12	38	36	+2	46	Qualification for the promotion play-offs
6	Sogndal	30	13	6	11	51	39	+12	45	Qualification for the promotion play-offs
7	Nest-Sotra	30	14	6	10	43	31	+12	44 (Note: Nest-Sotra had been deducted a total of 4 points due to financial difficulties. They were deducted 1 point in May and 3 points in October.)	
8	Ull/Kisa	30	11	6	13	47	47	0	39	
9	Sandnes Ulf	30	11	5	14	46	49	−3	38	
10	HamKam	30	11	5	14	43	47	−4	38	
11	Raufoss	30	12	2	16	47	59	−12	38	
12	Jerv	30	8	9	13	34	54	−20	33	
13	Strømmen	30	7	10	13	32	46	−14	30 (Note: Strømmen were deducted 1 point.)	
14	Notodden (R)	30	6	7	17	35	53	−18	25	Qualification for the relegation play-offs
15	Skeid (R)	30	4	10	16	38	54	−16	22	Relegation to Second Division
16	Tromsdalen (R)	30	3	4	23	36	79	−43	13	Relegation to Second Division

Source: nifs.no (in Norwegian), Soccerway
Rules for classification: 1) Points; 2) Goal difference; 3) Goals scored; 4) Head-to-head points; 5) Head-to-head goal difference; 6) Head-to-head away goals scored (only if between two teams); 7) Head-to-head goals scored; 8) Play-off (only used to decide champions or relegation).
(C) Champions; (O) Play-off winners; (P) Promoted; (R) Relegated

== Positions by round ==
Team ╲ Round	1	2	3	4	5	6	7	8	9	10	11	12	13	14	15	16	17	18	19	20	21	22	23	24	25	26	27	28	29	30
Aalesund	3	2	3	1	1	1	1	1	1	1	1	1	1	1	1	1	1	1	1	1	1	1	1	1	1	1	1	1	1	1
Sandefjord	3	1	2	3	3	2	2	2	2	3	2	2	2	2	2	2	2	3	2	3	3	3	3	2	2	2	2	2	2	2
Start	11	6	4	7	9	5	3	3	3	2	3	4	3	3	3	3	3	2	3	2	2	2	2	3	3	3	3	3	3	3
KFUM Oslo	11	15	14	11	8	4	8	5	4	4	5	3	6	6	5	5	4	4	4	4	4	4	4	4	4	4	4	6	4	4
Kongsvinger	3	8	8	5	6	8	5	8	6	6	4	6	5	5	6	7	7	7	7	7	7	6	6	7	6	7	7	5	7	5
Sogndal	7	13	7	9	12	13	11	13	13	11	10	8	10	9	8	6	6	6	6	5	6	5	5	6	8	6	6	7	5	6
Nest-Sotra	16	14	9	13	10	11	13	11	11	12	12	11	8	8	10	9	9	8	8	8	8	8	8	5	5	5	5	4	6	7
Ull/Kisa	7	3	1	4	7	3	7	4	7	7	7	7	7	7	9	10	10	11	9	10	10	12	12	12	11	10	9	9	10	8
Sandnes Ulf	7	10	10	6	11	7	9	7	8	9	9	9	9	10	7	8	8	9	10	11	11	10	9	9	10	12	12	10	8	9
HamKam	11	6	12	12	13	12	12	10	10	10	11	12	12	12	11	11	11	12	12	12	12	11	10	10	12	9	10	11	11	10
Raufoss	2	9	11	7	4	6	4	6	5	5	6	5	4	4	4	4	5	5	5	6	5	7	7	8	7	8	8	8	9	11
Jerv	1	4	5	2	2	9	6	9	9	8	8	10	11	11	12	12	12	10	11	9	9	9	11	11	9	11	11	12	12	12
Strømmen	10	11	13	14	14	15	15	15	15	14	14	14	15	15	14	14	14	14	14	15	15	14	15	14	14	14	13	13	13	13
Notodden	11	12	15	15	15	14	14	14	14	15	15	15	14	14	15	15	15	15	15	13	13	13	13	13	13	13	14	14	14	14
Skeid	3	5	6	10	5	10	10	12	12	13	13	13	13	13	13	13	13	13	13	14	14	15	14	15	15	15	15	15	15	15
Tromsdalen	15	16	16	16	16	16	16	16	16	16	16	16	16	16	16	16	16	16	16	16	16	16	16	16	16	16	16	16	16	16

Promotion to Eliteserien
Promotion play-offs
Relegation play-offs
Relegation to 2. divisjon

Source: nifs.no

== Results ==
Home \ Away	AAL	HAM	JER	KFU	KIL	NSO	NOT	RAU	SAN	ULF	SKE	SOG	IKS	SIF	TUI	UKI
Aalesund	—	5–2	4–0	2–1	1–0	2–0	3–1	3–1	3–1	3–1	4–2	3–1	2–1	3–1	5–0	1–0
HamKam	1–2	—	2–2	4–4	2–0	3–2	1–2	1–2	1–0	2–3	2–1	0–0	4–0	1–2	2–1	2–0
Jerv	0–0	1–0	—	2–2	0–2	0–1	3–1	1–0	0–2	0–0	5–1	1–1	1–7	1–1	1–0	2–0
KFUM Oslo	2–4	2–0	5–0	—	0–1	2–1	4–1	2–1	3–3	3–0	2–1	1–0	1–2	1–0	1–1	5–1
Kongsvinger	1–1	2–1	1–1	0–0	—	1–0	1–0	1–0	2–3	1–2	0–2	3–0	4–2	3–2	3–2	1–2
Nest-Sotra	0–1	2–0	4–1	2–2	3–0	—	2–1	1–2	1–1	3–0	2–1	1–0	0–1	1–1	2–0	2–0
Notodden	0–1	1–2	1–1	1–1	2–0	2–3	—	0–1	0–2	0–4	1–1	1–3	0–2	3–0	3–3	0–0
Raufoss	2–1	1–2	4–2	1–0	0–0	2–1	1–4	—	0–2	2–5	4–5	1–1	1–2	1–0	6–4	4–2
Sandefjord	1–1	2–0	1–0	1–0	1–0	2–1	3–0	1–0	—	3–1	1–0	0–3	0–0	2–0	1–0	3–2
Sandnes Ulf	1–2	0–2	2–3	2–3	1–2	0–0	1–0	3–1	2–4	—	3–2	0–1	2–0	0–3^{1}	3–2	2–0
Skeid	0–1	1–0	0–0	1–1	0–2	1–2	2–2	2–3	2–2	0–0	—	2–2	1–1	1–1	3–0	1–2
Sogndal	2–3	3–0	4–0	4–2	2–1	0–1	4–1	1–3	1–1	1–1	4–2	—	0–1	4–2	5–2	3–0
Start	0–1	4–1	3–2	0–0	3–1	2–0	0–3	2–1	2–2	3–2	2–0	1–0	—	4–0	2–0	2–1
Strømmen	1–2	0–0	3–1	0–3	2–0	0–2	1–1	2–1	2–3	0–0	1–1	2–0	0–0	—	0–4	1–1
Tromsdalen	0–1	2–5	1–3	2–3	1–3	2–2	0–2	3–0	3–3	1–4	1–0	0–1	1–3	0–2	—	0–8
Ull/Kisa	2–2	0–0	1–0	4–2	0–2	1–1	3–1	5–1	0–2	2–1	3–2	3–0	0–2	2–2	2–0	—

Source: Football Association of Norway (in Norwegian)
Legend: Blue = home team win; Yellow = draw; Red = away team win.
- ^{1}Due to a frozen pitch at Sandnes Stadion, the game was cancelled and the result was set to 0–3.

== Play-offs ==
=== Promotion play-offs ===
The 3rd to 6th placed teams took part in the promotion play-offs; these were single-leg knockout matches. In the first round, the fifth-placed team played at home against the sixth-placed team. The winner of the first round then met the fourth-placed team on away ground in the second round. The winner of the second round then met the third-placed team on away ground. The winner of the third round advanced to play the 14th-placed team in Eliteserien over two legs in the Eliteserien play-offs for a spot in the top-flight next season.

==== First round ====
23 November 2019
18:00 CET (UTC+1)

Kongsvinger	1–0	Sogndal
Skagestad 17'	Report

Gjemselund Stadion, Kongsvinger
Attendance: 1,433
Referee: Ola Hobber Nilsen

==== Second round ====
27 November 2019
18:30 CET (UTC+1)

KFUM Oslo	2–0	Kongsvinger
Brix 24'; Larsen 74'	Report

Intility Arena, Oslo
Attendance: 1,311
Referee: Kristoffer Hagenes

==== Third round ====
1 December 2019
15:00 CET (UTC+1)

Start	1–0	KFUM Oslo
Lowe 32'	Report

Sør Arena, Kristiansand
Attendance: 2,615
Referee: Rohit Saggi

=== Relegation play-offs ===
The 14th placed team took part in a two-legged play-off against the winners of the 2. divisjon play-offs to decide who would play in the 2020 1. divisjon.

21 November 2019
19:00 CET (UTC+1)

Notodden	1–3	Åsane
Tagbajumi 21'	Report	Nygard 23'; Hammersland 34', 54'

Idrettsparken, Notodden
Attendance: 468
24 November 2019
14:00 CET (UTC+1)

Åsane	2–2	Notodden
Hammersland 20', 80'	Report	Bakke 6'; Gustavsen 25'

Myrdal Stadion, Bergen
Attendance: 802

Åsane won 5–3 on aggregate.

== Season statistics ==
=== Top scorers ===
Rank	Player	Club	Goals
1	(Sweden) Pontus Engblom	Sandefjord	19
2	(Chile) Niklas Castro	Aalesund	17
3	(Norway) Adem Güven	Kongsvinger	15
4	(Norway) Kent Håvard Eriksen	Sandnes Ulf	14
5	(Senegal) Pape Habib Guèye	Aalesund	13
5	(Iceland) Aron Sigurðarson	Start	13
7	(Norway) Sivert Gussiås	Strømmen	12
7	(Norway) Simen Nordli	HamKam	12
7	(Norway) Martin Ramsland	Start	12
10	(Norway) Torbjørn Agdestein	Aalesund	10
10	(Norway) Sigurd Hauso Haugen	Sogndal	10
10	(Nigeria) Kachi	Sandnes Ulf	10
10	(Norway) Moses Mawa	KFUM Oslo	10
10	(Norway) David Tavakoli	Skeid/KFUM Oslo	10
