= 2018 Norwegian First Division =

1. divisjon
- Season: 2018
- Dates: 2 April – 11 November
- Champions: Viking
- Promoted: Viking; Mjøndalen
- Relegated: Åsane; Florø; Levanger
- Matches: 240
- Goals: 728 (3.03 per match)
- Top goalscorer: Tommy Høiland (21 goals)
- Biggest home win: Kongsvinger 6–0 Sandnes Ulf (7 August 2018)
- Biggest away win: Strømmen 1–6 Viking (1 July 2018); Åsane 0–5 Strømmen (4 November 2018)
- Highest scoring: Ull/Kisa 4–5 Viking (29 April 2018); Kongsvinger 7–2 Åsane (7 October 2018)
- Longest winning run: 6 games Aalesund
- Longest unbeaten run: 13 games Mjøndalen
- Longest winless run: 20 games Levanger
- Longest losing run: 6 games Levanger
- Highest attendance: 15,900; Viking 3–1 Kongsvinger (11 November 2018)
- Lowest attendance: 100; Tromsdalen 3–1 Nest-Sotra (27 May 2018)
- Average attendance: 1,697 ▲19.3%

The 2018 1. divisjon (referred to as OBOS-ligaen for sponsorship reasons) was a Norwegian second-tier football league season.

The season began on 2 April 2018 and ended on 11 November 2018 (not including playoff matches).

== Team changes from 2017 ==
In the 2017 1. divisjon, Bodø/Glimt, Start and Ranheim were promoted to the 2018 Eliteserien, while Fredrikstad, Elverum and Arendal were relegated to the 2018 2. divisjon.

Sogndal, Aalesund and Viking were relegated from the 2017 Eliteserien, while HamKam, Nest-Sotra and Notodden were promoted from the 2017 2. divisjon.

== Teams ==
Locations of the teams in the 2018 1. divisjon

=== Stadia and personnel ===
Team	Location	Arena	Capacity	Manager
Aalesund	Ålesund	Color Line Stadion	10,778	(Norway) Lars Bohinen
Florø	Florø	Florø Stadion	2,700	(Norway) Terje Rognsø
HamKam	Hamar	Briskeby Arena	7,800	(Norway) Kevin Knappen
Jerv	Grimstad	Levermyr Stadion	3,300	(Norway) Arne Sandstø
Kongsvinger	Kongsvinger	Gjemselund Stadion	5,824	(England) Mark Dempsey
Levanger	Levanger	TOBB Arena	2,100	(Norway) Roger Naustan
Mjøndalen	Mjøndalen	Isachsen Stadion	4,200	(Norway) Vegard Hansen
Nest-Sotra	Sotra	Ågotnes Stadion	1,200	(Norway) Steffen Landro
Notodden	Notodden	Idrettsparken	4,000	(Norway) Kenneth Dokken
Sandnes Ulf	Sandnes	Sandnes Stadion	4,969	(Norway) Bengt Sæternes
Sogndal	Sogndalsfjøra	Fosshaugane Campus	5,622	(Norway) Eirik Bakke
Strømmen	Strømmen	Strømmen Stadion	1,850	(Norway) Espen Olsen
Tromsdalen	Tromsdalen	TUIL Arena	1,695	(Norway) Gaute Helstrup
Ull/Kisa	Jessheim	Jessheim Stadion	3,500	(Norway) Vegard Skogheim
Viking	Stavanger	Viking Stadion	15,900	(Norway) Bjarne Berntsen
Åsane	Åsane	Myrdal Gress	2,180	(Norway) Mons Ivar Mjelde

=== Managerial changes ===
Team	Outgoing manager	Manner of departure	Date of vacancy	Table	Incoming manager	Date of appointment	Table
Aalesund	(Norway) Trond Fredriksen	Sacked	12 December 2017	Pre-season	(Norway) Lars Bohinen	20 December 2017	Pre-season
Viking	(Norway) Bjarte Lunde Aarsheim (interim)	End of caretaker spell	18 December 2017	Pre-season	(Norway) Bjarne Berntsen	18 December 2017	Pre-season
Levanger	(Sweden) Magnus Powell	Contract expired	31 December 2017	Pre-season	(Norway) Roger Naustan	1 January 2018	Pre-season
Kongsvinger	(Norway) Hans-Erik Eriksen	Sacked	30 April 2018	15th	(England) Mark Dempsey	11 June 2018	10th

== League table ==
Pos	Team	Pld	W	D	L	GF	GA	GD	Pts	Promotion, qualification or relegation
1	Viking (C, P)	30	20	1	9	68	44	+24	61	Promotion to Eliteserien
2	Mjøndalen (P)	30	17	9	4	49	24	+25	60	Promotion to Eliteserien
3	Aalesund	30	18	5	7	58	31	+27	59	Qualification for the promotion play-offs
4	Sogndal	30	15	6	9	47	31	+16	51	Qualification for the promotion play-offs
5	Ull/Kisa	30	11	10	9	59	49	+10	43	Qualification for the promotion play-offs
6	Nest-Sotra	30	12	7	11	43	41	+2	43	Qualification for the promotion play-offs
7	Tromsdalen	30	12	7	11	43	47	−4	43	
8	Kongsvinger	30	12	6	12	59	49	+10	42	
9	HamKam	30	12	6	12	46	44	+2	42	
10	Sandnes Ulf	30	11	9	10	43	47	−4	42	
11	Strømmen	30	12	2	16	49	53	−4	38	
12	Notodden	30	10	6	14	36	40	−4	36	
13	Jerv	30	8	11	11	31	41	−10	35	
14	Åsane (R)	30	9	6	15	38	57	−19	33	Qualification for the relegation play-offs
15	Florø (R)	30	8	3	19	27	59	−32	27	Relegation to Second Division
16	Levanger (R)	30	3	6	21	32	71	−39	15	Relegation to Second Division

Source: nifs.no (in Norwegian), Soccerway
Rules for classification: 1) Points; 2) Goal difference; 3) Goals scored; 4) Head-to-head points; 5) Head-to-head goal difference; 6) Head-to-head away goals scored (only if between two teams); 7) Head-to-head goals scored; 8) Play-off (only used to decide champions or relegation).
(C) Champions; (P) Promoted; (R) Relegated

== Positions by round ==
Team ╲ Round	1	2	3	4	5	6	7	8	9	10	11	12	13	14	15	16	17	18	19	20	21	22	23	24	25	26	27	28	29	30
Viking	2	8	4	4	2	2	2	2	2	2	2	2	4	4	3	3	2	4	3	2	3	2	3	3	3	3	3	2	1	1
Mjøndalen	5	3	5	8	7	8	6	8	8	5	4	4	3	3	4	4	4	3	2	3	2	3	2	2	1	2	1	1	2	2
Aalesund	12	4	2	1	1	1	1	1	1	1	1	1	1	1	1	1	1	1	1	1	1	1	1	1	2	1	2	3	3	3
Sogndal	11	11	11	7	5	4	5	7	7	4	3	3	2	2	2	2	3	2	4	4	4	4	4	4	4	4	4	4	4	4
Ull/Kisa	6	10	6	5	6	6	4	3	4	7	5	6	5	5	5	5	5	6	7	7	7	5	5	5	5	6	5	6	5	5
Nest-Sotra	15	15	16	16	15	11	12	9	11	13	11	13	12	10	11	11	12	9	9	8	8	9	8	8	11	9	10	8	7	6
Tromsdalen	4	6	8	10	10	12	8	11	12	11	13	12	9	6	7	6	7	7	5	6	6	7	7	7	6	5	6	7	8	7
Kongsvinger	16	16	12	13	16	15	16	15	15	14	12	10	7	9	10	7	6	5	6	5	5	6	6	6	8	8	8	5	6	8
HamKam	9	14	13	12	13	10	10	14	10	10	7	9	11	12	12	13	13	13	10	11	10	8	10	11	9	11	9	10	9	9
Sandnes Ulf	3	1	1	3	3	3	3	4	3	3	6	7	8	8	6	8	8	8	11	10	9	11	9	9	7	7	7	9	10	10
Strømmen	13	7	10	6	9	9	13	13	14	15	15	15	16	14	14	14	15	15	14	15	14	14	14	14	13	12	12	12	11	11
Notodden	10	2	3	2	4	5	7	6	6	9	10	8	10	11	9	9	10	11	8	9	13	13	13	13	14	14	14	14	13	12
Jerv	14	13	15	14	14	14	11	10	9	6	8	5	6	7	8	10	11	12	12	12	11	10	12	10	10	10	11	11	12	13
Åsane	1	9	7	9	8	7	9	5	5	8	9	11	13	13	13	12	9	10	13	13	12	12	11	12	12	13	13	13	14	14
Florø	8	5	9	11	12	13	15	16	16	16	16	16	15	16	16	16	14	14	15	14	15	15	15	15	15	15	15	15	15	15
Levanger	7	12	14	15	11	16	14	12	13	12	14	14	14	15	15	15	16	16	16	16	16	16	16	16	16	16	16	16	16	16

Promotion to Eliteserien
Promotion play-offs
Relegation play-offs
Relegation to 2. divisjon

Source: nifs.no

== Results ==
Home \ Away	AAL	FLO	HAM	JER	KON	LEV	MJØ	NES	NOT	SAN	SOG	STR	TRO	ULL	VIK	ÅSA
Aalesund	—	4–0	1–2	1–1	2–1	4–0	2–1	0–1	3–0	4–0	0–0	2–2	4–0	3–2	1–3	1–0
Florø	1–4	—	0–1	3–2	1–0	0–2	0–2	0–2	1–4	1–3	1–2	2–1	1–0	1–1	3–2	1–2
HamKam	1–3	3–0	—	2–0	3–1	2–2	1–3	1–1	1–3	0–0	1–3	3–2	0–0	3–1	2–3	2–1
Jerv	0–3	1–0	2–3	—	1–2	0–0	0–0	4–1	1–0	1–1	0–0	1–0	0–1	1–1	3–2	1–1
Kongsvinger	1–3	5–1	2–1	2–0	—	2–1	0–1	2–2	2–0	6–0	1–3	1–2	1–1	2–1	0–2	7–2
Levanger	1–2	0–1	4–3	2–3	1–1	—	0–4	0–1	0–3	3–4	1–2	1–4	1–2	2–3	0–0	1–2
Mjøndalen	2–0	1–1	2–1	1–1	2–0	4–0	—	3–3	1–1	1–0	0–0	1–0	0–0	0–2	2–4	1–1
Nest-Sotra	1–0	0–1	1–0	2–2	2–2	4–1	1–2	—	1–0	2–3	0–1	0–2	2–0	0–3	5–0	1–0
Notodden	1–1	2–1	0–1	0–1	1–2	1–1	1–0	2–1	—	1–0	0–2	1–1	2–3	5–3	1–2	0–0
Sandnes Ulf	1–2	4–0	1–3	0–0	0–3	1–0	0–2	1–1	1–1	—	1–0	2–1	2–1	1–1	3–0	3–0
Sogndal	2–0	2–3	1–0	0–0	4–1	5–1	3–4	1–0	0–1	2–2	—	5–1	1–1	1–2	1–0	1–4
Strømmen	0–1	2–0	3–2	2–3	2–6	3–0	0–1	1–2	1–0	2–1	1–0	—	1–3	3–2	1–6	3–0
Tromsdalen	2–2	1–0	0–2	1–0	3–3	1–2	0–2	3–1	4–2	2–2	0–3	3–2	—	3–0	0–2	1–0
Ull/Kisa	3–0	1–1	1–1	4–1	1–1	3–2	2–2	1–1	1–2	2–2	2–0	2–1	4–2	—	4–5	1–1
Viking	0–2	2–1	2–0	4–1	3–1	3–0	0–2	2–3	3–1	5–2	2–0	2–0	2–4	1–0	—	4–0
Åsane	2–3	3–1	1–1	2–0	3–1	3–3	0–2	3–1	1–0	0–2	1–2	0–5	3–1	1–5	1–2	—

Source: Norwegian Football Federation (in Norwegian), NIFS (in Norwegian)
Legend: Blue = home team win; Yellow = draw; Red = away team win.

== Play-offs ==
=== Promotion play-offs ===
The 3rd to 6th placed teams took part in the promotion play-offs; these were single leg knockout matches. In the first round, the 3rd placed team played at home against the 6th placed team, and the 4th placed team played at home against the 5th placed team. The two winners then played against each other in the second round, where the team with the highest table position played at home. The winner of the second round, Aalesund, advanced to play the 14th placed team in Eliteserien over two legs in the Eliteserien play-offs for a spot in the top-flight next season.

==== First round ====
25 November 2018
16:00 CET (UTC+1)

Aalesund	1–0	Nest-Sotra
Guèye 52'	Summary

Color Line Stadion, Ålesund
Attendance: 3,102
Referee: Tommy Skjerven
25 November 2018
16:00 CET (UTC+1)

Sogndal	1–0	Ull/Kisa
Haugen 90'	Summary

Fosshaugane Campus, Sogndalsfjøra
Attendance: 1,902
Referee: Trygve Kjensli

==== Second round ====
29 November 2018
18:00 CET (UTC+1)

Aalesund	3–1	Sogndal
Friðjónsson 48' (pen.); Guèye 55', 90'	Summary	Fredriksen 50'

Color Line Stadion, Ålesund
Attendance: 3,458
Referee: Kristoffer Hagenes

=== Relegation play-offs ===
The 14th placed team, Åsane, took part in a two-legged play-off against KFUM Oslo, the winners of the 2. divisjon play-offs, to decide who would play in the 2019 1. divisjon. KFUM Oslo won 4-3 on aggregate and were therefore promoted, while Åsane got relegated.

17 November 2018
13:00 CET (UTC+1)

KFUM Oslo	1–2	Åsane
Larsen 54'	Summary	Huseklepp 74'; Ogungbaro 85'

KFUM Arena, Oslo
Referee: Marius Lien
25 November 2018
13:00 CET (UTC+1)

Åsane	1–3	KFUM Oslo
Bruun-Hanssen 17'	Summary	Larsen 58'; Mawa 73'; Sortevik 81'

Myrdal Gress, Bergen
Attendance: 925
Referee: Mohammad Usman Aslam

KFUM Oslo won 4–3 on aggregate.

== Season statistics ==
=== Top scorers ===
Rank	Player	Club	Goals
1	(Norway) Tommy Høiland	Viking	21
2	(Iceland) Hólmbert Friðjónsson	Aalesund	19
3	(Norway) Sindre Mauritz-Hansen	Strømmen	17
4	(Norway) Sigurd Haugen	Sogndal	15
4	(Nigeria) Shuaibu Ibrahim	Kongsvinger	15
6	(Norway) Kristoffer Normann Hansen	Ull/Kisa	13
6	(Norway) Alexander Dang	Nest-Sotra	13
8	(Norway) Torbjørn Agdestein	Aalesund	12
8	(Norway) Johnny Furdal	Nest-Sotra / Viking	12
10	(Norway) Ole Andreas Nesset	Ull/Kisa	11
10	(Norway) Adem Güven	Kongsvinger	11
10	(Norway) Vegard Lysvoll	Tromsdalen	11

=== Attendances ===
Pos	Team	Total	High	Low	Average	Change
1	Viking	118,499	15,900	6,009	7,900	+7.0%^{1}
2	Aalesund	72,177	5,524	4,362	4,812	−20.6%^{1}
3	Sogndal	31,338	3,113	1,587	2,089	−35.6%^{1}
4	Mjøndalen	27,627	3,630	1,352	1,842	+8.3%
5	HamKam	25,358	4,683	952	1,691	+27.1%^{2}
6	Sandnes Ulf	25,012	4,364	1,300	1,667	+6.2%
7	Kongsvinger	22,981	2,912	1,024	1,532	+9.4%
8	Jerv	18,755	1,705	985	1,250	−14.8%
9	Florø	14,751	1,586	610	983	−20.5%
10	Ull/Kisa	11,077	1,332	465	738	+3.5%
11	Notodden	9,997	1,373	472	666	+2.3%^{2}
12	Levanger	8,848	1,042	220	590	−24.2%
13	Åsane	7,557	1,031	290	504	−6.1%
14	Strømmen	6,144	739	190	410	−6.4%
15	Tromsdalen	5,803	1,160	100	387	+2.9%
16	Nest-Sotra	4,722	840	169	315	+22.1%^{2}
	League total	407,513	15,900	100	1,697	+19.3%

Source: nifs.no
Notes:
1: Team played last season in Eliteserien.
2: Team played last season in 2. divisjon.

== Awards ==
Award	Winner	Club
Manager of the season	(Norway) Steffen Landro	Nest-Sotra
Player of the season	(Norway) Johnny Furdal	Nest-Sotra / Viking
Young player of the season	(Norway) Kristian Thorstvedt	Viking
OBOS Player of the season	(Iceland) Hólmbert Friðjónsson	Aalesund
