= 2021 Norwegian Second Division =

Norwegian football season

Norwegian Second Division
- Season: 2021
- Dates: 19 June 2021 – 14 November 2021
- Champions: Kongsvinger (Group 1); Skeid (Group 2)
- Promoted: Kongsvinger; Skeid
- Relegated: Florø; Fløya; Senja; Fram Larvik; Nardo; Rosenborg 2
- Matches played: 364
- Goals scored: 1,282 (3.52 per match)
- Top goalscorer: Group 1: Adem Güven (21 goals); Group 2: Melvin Frithzell & Abel William Stensrud (22 goals)
- Biggest home win: Skeid 12–0 Rosenborg 2 (6 November 2021)
- Biggest away win: Odd 2 0–6 Levanger (10 October 2021); Rosenborg 2 1–7 Øygarden (14 November 2021)
- Highest scoring: Skeid 12–0 Rosenborg 2 (6 November 2021)

The 2021 Norwegian Second Division (referred to as PostNord-ligaen for sponsorship reasons) was a Norwegian football third-tier league season. The league consisted of 28 teams divided into 2 groups of 14 teams.

The league was played as a double round-robin tournament, where all teams played 26 matches. The season started on 19 June 2021 and concluded on 14 November 2021.

Kongsvinger earned promotion from group 1 on 23 October 2021, three rounds before the end of the season. Skeid secured promotion from group 2 on 6 November 2021, following a 12–0 win against Rosenborg 2.

== Team changes ==
The following teams changed division since the 2020 season.

=== To 2. divisjon ===
Relegated from 1. divisjon

- Kongsvinger
- Øygarden

=== From 2. divisjon ===
Promoted to 1. divisjon

- Bryne
- Fredrikstad

== Group 1 ==
=== Teams ===
Locations of the 2021 2. divisjon group 1 teams.

The following 14 clubs compete in group 1:

Club	Location	Stadium	Capacity
Alta	Alta	Finnmarkshallen	1,200
Asker	Asker	Føyka Stadion	2,400
Brattvåg	Brattvåg	Brattvåg Stadion	1,500
Bærum	Bærum	Sandvika Stadion	1,500
Eidsvold Turn	Eidsvoll	Myhrer Stadion	1,500
Florø	Florø	Florø Stadion	2,800
Fløya	Tromsø	Fløya Arena	1,500
Hødd	Ulsteinvik	Nye Høddvoll	4,081
Kongsvinger	Kongsvinger	Gjemselund Stadion	5,824
Kvik Halden	Halden	Halden Stadion	4,200
Moss	Moss	Melløs Stadion	4,000
Senja	Silsand	Senja Stadion	1,500
Tromsdalen	Tromsø	TUIL Arena	3,000
Vålerenga 2	Oslo	Intility Arena	16,555

=== League table ===
Pos	Team	Pld	W	D	L	GF	GA	GD	Pts	Promotion, qualification or relegation
1	Kongsvinger (C, P)	26	22	2	2	88	26	+62	68	Promotion to First Division
2	Hødd	26	18	6	2	67	18	+49	60	Qualification for promotion play-offs
3	Asker	26	15	4	7	60	37	+23	49	
4	Tromsdalen	26	13	6	7	52	34	+18	45	
5	Brattvåg	26	12	5	9	55	48	+7	41	
6	Alta	26	12	5	9	49	47	+2	41	
7	Kvik Halden	26	12	5	9	46	48	−2	41	
8	Eidsvold Turn	26	11	6	9	45	47	−2	39	
9	Bærum	26	9	3	14	41	51	−10	30	
10	Moss	26	8	5	13	44	51	−7	29	
11	Vålerenga 2	26	7	5	14	43	63	−20	26	
12	Florø (R)	26	5	3	18	29	63	−34	18	Relegation to Third Division
13	Fløya (R)	26	2	8	16	29	72	−43	14	Relegation to Third Division
14	Senja (R)	26	2	5	19	22	65	−43	11	Relegation to Third Division

Source: NIFS (in Norwegian)
Rules for classification: 1) Points; 2) Goal difference; 3) Goals scored; 4) Head-to-head points; 5) Head-to-head goal difference; 6) Head-to-head goals scored.
(C) Champions; (P) Promoted; (R) Relegated

=== Results ===
Home \ Away	ALT	ASK	BRA	BÆR	ETF	FLO	FLØ	HØD	KIL	KVH	MOS	SEN	TRO	VIF
Alta	—	3–1	1–1	2–1	1–3	3–0	5–1	1–4	2–3	4–3	3–1	3–1	1–1	2–2
Asker	1–2	—	3–3	3–0	4–2	2–0	3–2	2–2	2–3	3–1	2–1	4–1	3–2	1–2
Brattvåg	2–0	0–2	—	2–0	1–1	3–1	3–1	3–1	0–4	3–1	3–3	2–0	3–2	5–0
Bærum	3–2	1–2	1–3	—	3–0	3–2	1–2	0–1	0–2	6–2	4–1	2–0	2–0	2–2
Eidsvold Turn	4–0	2–2	2–0	3–1	—	4–1	2–0	0–4	1–4	1–1	2–2	2–1	2–2	3–2
Florø	1–2	2–1	1–2	1–1	3–1	—	1–1	1–4	0–5	0–1	0–2	3–0	1–1	1–2
Fløya	2–4	1–4	4–3	1–2	0–3	1–2	—	2–6	0–3	1–1	2–5	1–1	1–1	1–1
Hødd	1–1	1–1	1–0	3–1	2–0	7–1	1–0	—	0–0	3–0	1–1	3–0	4–0	7–1
Kongsvinger	3–2	3–1	5–4	4–0	6–0	4–0	4–1	1–0	—	7–0	5–1	5–0	1–3	2–0
Kvik Halden	0–0	1–2	3–2	1–0	3–1	3–2	2–2	0–1	3–2	—	1–0	5–1	3–1	5–1
Moss	3–0	0–4	1–0	2–2	1–3	3–1	6–0	1–3	0–4	0–2	—	4–0	4–0	2–5
Senja	0–1	0–2	2–3	4–1	1–1	1–2	1–1	0–4	3–3	2–3	0–0	—	1–3	1–0
Tromsdalen	3–1	2–0	2–2	4–1	2–1	3–0	6–0	0–0	1–2	2–0	3–0	2–0	—	4–1
Vålerenga 2	2–3	0–5	6–2	2–3	0–1	3–2	1–1	1–3	2–3	1–1	1–0	5–1	0–2	—

Source: Norwegian Football Federation
Legend: Blue = home team win; Yellow = draw; Red = away team win.

=== Top scorers ===
Rank	Player	Club	Goals
1	(Norway) Adem Güven	Kongsvinger	21
2	(Norway) Didrik Sereba	Asker	19
3	(Norway) Robin Hjelmeseth	Hødd	15
3	(Norway) Martin Hoel Andersen	Kongsvinger	15
5	(Norway) Oskar Løken	Hødd	14
6	(Norway) Brage Berg Pedersen	Kongsvinger	13
6	(Norway) Sondre Sandnes Beite	Brattvåg	13
8	(Norway) Morten Gamst Pedersen	Alta	12
9	(Norway) Sigurd Grønli	Tromsdalen	11
9	(Norway) Øystein Lundblad Næsheim	Kvik Halden	11
9	(Norway) Ole Andreas Nesset	Eidsvold Turn	11

== Group 2 ==
=== Teams ===
Locations of the 2021 2. divisjon group 2 teams.

The following 14 clubs compete in group 2:

Club	Location	Stadium	Capacity
Arendal	Arendal	Norac Stadion	5,000
Egersund	Egersund	Idrettsparken	2,000
Fløy	Flekkerøy	Arkicon Arena	2,000
Fram Larvik	Larvik	Framparken	2,500
Kjelsås	Oslo	Grefsen Stadion	2,000
Levanger	Levanger	TOBB Arena	2,200
Nardo	Trondheim	Nissekollen Idrettspark	1,800
Notodden	Notodden	Optime Arena	4,000
Odd 2	Skien	Skagerak Arena	11,767
Rosenborg 2	Trondheim	SalMar Banen	1,000
Skeid	Oslo	Nordre Åsen Kunstgress	2,500
Sotra	Sotra	Straume Stadion	1,200
Vard Haugesund	Haugesund	Haugesund Sparebank Arena	8,754
Øygarden	Ågotnes	Ågotnes Stadion	1,200

=== League table ===
Pos	Team	Pld	W	D	L	GF	GA	GD	Pts	Promotion, qualification or relegation
1	Skeid (C, P)	26	17	5	4	63	22	+41	56	Promotion to First Division
2	Arendal	26	13	9	4	57	38	+19	48	Qualification for promotion play-offs
3	Egersund	26	15	3	8	55	40	+15	48	
4	Levanger	26	13	4	9	65	41	+24	43	
5	Vard Haugesund	26	13	4	9	39	32	+7	43	
6	Notodden	26	11	6	9	53	43	+10	39	
7	Øygarden	26	10	9	7	41	34	+7	39	
8	Odd 2	26	10	4	12	32	42	−10	34	
9	Kjelsås	26	8	9	9	43	44	−1	33	
10	Sotra	26	10	3	13	41	48	−7	33	
11	Fløy-Flekkerøy	26	5	12	9	30	38	−8	27	
12	Fram Larvik (R)	26	6	9	11	33	42	−9	27	Relegation to Third Division
13	Nardo (R)	26	6	6	14	31	55	−24	24	Relegation to Third Division
14	Rosenborg 2 (R)	26	2	3	21	29	93	−64	9	Relegation to Third Division

Source: NIFS (in Norwegian)
Rules for classification: 1) Points; 2) Goal difference; 3) Goals scored; 4) Head-to-head points; 5) Head-to-head goal difference; 6) Head-to-head goals scored.
(C) Champions; (P) Promoted; (R) Relegated

=== Results ===
Home \ Away	ARE	EIK	FLE	FRA	KJE	LEV	NAR	NOT	ODD	RBK	SKE	SOT	VAR	ØYG
Arendal	—	5–2	1–1	2–1	0–0	1–1	2–2	2–1	3–0	9–2	2–2	4–1	1–0	3–1
Egersund	3–0	—	4–1	3–1	3–1	0–1	3–0	1–3	1–2	2–0	2–2	5–0	2–0	1–0
Fløy-Flekkerøy	2–2	2–4	—	0–0	2–2	2–3	3–0	1–1	2–1	2–1	0–1	0–0	2–2	0–0
Fram Larvik	1–1	3–2	1–1	—	2–1	0–0	2–2	2–3	0–1	3–0	1–2	3–1	0–4	1–1
Kjelsås	2–2	1–0	1–4	1–1	—	0–1	0–1	3–2	3–2	6–1	2–2	3–1	3–1	2–2
Levanger	3–1	0–1	1–0	2–4	1–2	—	6–0	2–4	3–0	5–1	1–2	2–1	3–4	8–0
Nardo	2–2	2–3	3–2	2–0	0–0	1–4	—	0–2	1–3	3–2	0–4	3–1	0–0	2–3
Notodden	1–2	2–3	0–1	4–1	3–3	2–2	1–1	—	1–0	7–2	2–3	3–0	3–1	1–0
Odd 2	2–3	1–2	0–0	2–2	1–1	0–6	2–1	6–1	—	1–0	1–0	2–1	0–2	1–1
Rosenborg 2	0–4	6–3	1–1	1–2	1–3	5–2	1–3	0–2	2–3	—	0–3	0–2	0–1	1–7
Skeid	1–2	2–3	2–0	2–0	4–0	2–1	2–1	2–2	2–0	12–0	—	3–0	5–0	2–1
Sotra	4–1	4–1	0–0	3–2	3–1	3–4	3–1	0–0	3–0	5–0	1–0	—	0–2	3–2
Vard Haugesund	0–1	1–1	5–1	1–0	1–0	3–1	2–0	3–2	0–1	1–1	0–1	2–1	—	2–0
Øygarden	3–1	0–0	2–0	0–0	3–2	2–2	2–0	2–0	1–0	1–1	0–0	4–0	3–1	—

Source: Norwegian Football Federation
Legend: Blue = home team win; Yellow = draw; Red = away team win.

=== Top scorers ===
Rank	Player	Club	Goals
1	(Sweden) Melvin Frithzell	Notodden	22
1	(Norway) Abel William Stensrud	Skeid	22
3	(Norway) Arne Gunnes	Levanger	21
4	(Norway) Andreas Hellum	Arendal	17
5	(Norway) Erling Myklebust	Vard Haugesund	16
6	(Norway) Johnny Buduson	Skeid	15
7	(Faroe Islands) Patrik Johannesen	Egersund	13
7	(Norway) Stian Michalsen	Egersund	13
9	(Norway) Ole Erik Midtskogen	Kjelsås	11
10	(Norway) Lars Kilen	Sotra	10
10	(Norway) Jørgen Voilås	Notodden	10

== Promotion play-offs ==
The teams who finished in second place in their respective group qualified for the promotion play-offs, where they faced each other over two legs. The winner went on to play against the 14th-placed team in the First Division for a place in the First Division next season.

20 November 2021
16:00 CET

Hødd	2–1	Arendal
Hjelmeseth 22'; Bruun-Hanssen 59'	Report	Meinseth 74'

Høddvoll, Ulsteinvik
Attendance: 954
Referee: Magnus Nicolai Koløy
27 November 2021
15:00 CET

Arendal	2–2	Hødd
Johansen 20'; Hellum 45' (pen.)	Report	Wrele 13'; Løken 62'

Norac Stadion, Arendal
Attendance: 1,274
Referee: Ajdin Medic

Hødd won 4–3 on aggregate.
