= 2023 Eliteserien =

79th season of top-tier football league in Norway

Eliteserien
- Season: 2023
- Dates: 10 April – 3 December
- Champions: Bodø/Glimt; 3rd title
- Relegated: Vålerenga; Stabæk; Aalesund
- Champions League: Bodø/Glimt
- Europa League: Molde (via Norwegian Football Cup)
- Conference League: Brann; Tromsø
- Matches: 240
- Goals: 748 (3.12 per match)
- Top goalscorer: Amahl Pellegrino (24 goals)
- Biggest home win: Molde 5–0 Sandefjord (29 May 2023); Sarpsborg 6–1 Sandefjord (2 July 2023); Haugesund 6–1 Aalesund (28 October 2023)
- Biggest away win: HamKam 0–4 Molde (7 May 2023); Vålerenga 0–4 Molde (15 July 2023); Stabæk 0–4 Bodø/Glimt (5 November 2023); Aalesund 0–4 Viking (26 November 2023)
- Highest scoring: Viking 7–3 HamKam (30 April 2023)
- Longest winning run: 10 matches Viking
- Longest unbeaten run: 13 matches Viking
- Longest winless run: 14 matches Stabæk
- Longest losing run: 7 matches Stabæk
- Highest attendance: 21,266; Rosenborg - Bodø/Glimt (17 September 2023)
- Lowest attendance: 2,214; Stabæk - Haugesund (23 April 2023)
- Average attendance: 7,239
- All statistics correct as of 3 December 2023.

The 2023 Eliteserien was the 79th season of top-tier football in Norway. This was the seventh season of Eliteserien after rebranding from Tippeligaen. Bodø/Glimt were crowned the champions at the end of the season, winning their 3rd Norwegian league title.

The season started on 10 April 2023 and ended on 3 December 2023, not including play-off matches.

Molde were the defending champions. Brann and Stabæk joined as the promoted clubs from the 2022 Norwegian First Division. They replaced Kristiansund and Jerv who were relegated to the 2023 Norwegian First Division.

== Teams ==
Sixteen teams competed in the league – the top fourteen teams from the previous season, and two teams promoted from the First Division. The promoted teams were Brann and Stabæk, both returning to the top flight after a season's absence. They replaced Kristiansund and Jerv, ending their top flight spells of six years and one year respectively.

=== Stadiums and locations ===
Locations of the teams in the 2023 Eliteserien

Note: Table lists in alphabetical order.

Team	Ap.	Location	County	Arena	Turf	Capacity
Aalesund	19	Ålesund	Møre og Romsdal	Color Line Stadion	Artificial	10,778
Bodø/Glimt	28	Bodø	Nordland	Aspmyra Stadion	Artificial	8,300
Brann	65	Bergen	Vestland	Brann Stadion	Natural	16,750
HamKam	24	Hamar	Innlandet	Briskeby	Artificial	7,800
Haugesund	17	Haugesund	Rogaland	Haugesund Sparebank Arena	Natural	8,754
Lillestrøm	59	Lillestrøm	Viken	Åråsen Stadion	Natural	11,500
Molde	47	Molde	Møre og Romsdal	Aker Stadion	Artificial	11,249
Odd	42	Skien	Vestfold og Telemark	Skagerak Arena	Artificial	11,767
Rosenborg	60	Trondheim	Trøndelag	Lerkendal Stadion	Natural	21,421
Sandefjord	11	Sandefjord	Vestfold og Telemark	Release Arena	Natural	6,582
Sarpsborg	12	Sarpsborg	Viken	Sarpsborg Stadion	Artificial	8,022
Stabæk	26	Bærum	Viken	Nadderud Stadion	Artificial	4,938
Strømsgodset	36	Drammen	Viken	Marienlyst Stadion	Artificial	8,935
Tromsø	35	Tromsø	Troms og Finnmark	Romssa Arena	Artificial	6,687
Viking	73	Stavanger	Rogaland	SR-Bank Arena	Artificial	15,900
Vålerenga	63	Oslo	Oslo	Intility Arena	Artificial	16,555

=== Personnel and kits ===
Team	Manager(s)	Captain	Kit manufacturer	Shirt sponsor
Aalesund	(Norway) Christian Johnsen	(Sweden) David Fällman	Umbro	Sparebanken Møre
Bodø/Glimt	(Norway) Kjetil Knutsen	(Norway) Ulrik Saltnes	Diadora	SpareBank 1 Nord-Norge
Brann	(Norway) Eirik Horneland	(Norway) Sivert Heltne Nilsen	Nike	Sparebanken Vest
HamKam	(Denmark) Jakob Michelsen	(Norway) Aleksander Melgalvis	Puma	OBOS
Haugesund	(Denmark) Sancheev Manoharan (caretaker)	(Denmark) Peter Therkildsen	Umbro	Haugaland Kraft
Lillestrøm	(Norway) Eirik Bakke (caretaker)	(Norway) Gjermund Åsen	Puma	DNB
Molde	(Norway) Erling Moe	(Norway) Magnus Wolff Eikrem	Adidas	Sparebanken Møre
Odd	(Norway) Pål Arne Johansen	(Norway) Steffen Hagen	Hummel	Skagerak Energi
Rosenborg	(Norway) Svein Maalen (caretaker)	(Norway) Markus Henriksen	Adidas	SpareBank 1 SMN
Sandefjord	(Norway) Hans Erik Ødegaard (Sweden) Andreas Tegström	(Norway) Sander Moen Foss	Macron	Jotun
Sarpsborg	(Sweden) Stefan Billborn	(Norway) Joachim Thomassen	Hummel	Borregaard
Stabæk	(United States) Bob Bradley	(Norway) Fredrik Krogstad	Nike	SpareBank 1 Østlandet
Strømsgodset	(Norway) Jørgen Isnes	(Norway) Gustav Valsvik	Puma	Sparebanken Øst
Tromsø	(Norway) Gaute Helstrup	(Norway) Ruben Yttergård Jenssen	Select	SpareBank 1 Nord-Norge
Viking	(Norway) Bjarte Lunde Aarsheim (Norway) Morten Jensen	(Norway) Zlatko Tripić	Diadora	Lyse
Vålerenga	(Norway) Geir Bakke	(Norway) Stefan Strandberg	Adidas	OBOS

=== Managerial changes ===
Team	Outgoing manager	Manner of departure	Date of vacancy	Position in the table	Incoming manager	Date of appointment
Strømsgodset	(Norway) Bjørn Petter Ingebretsen (Norway) Håkon Wibe-Lund	Mutual consent	13 November 2022	Pre-season	(Norway) Jørgen Isnes	14 December 2022
Aalesund	(Norway) Lars Arne Nilsen	Mutual consent	4 May 2023	16th	(Norway) Marius Bøe (caretaker)	4 May 2023
Vålerenga	(Norway) Dag-Eilev Fagermo	Mutual consent	12 June 2023	13th	(Norway) Jan Frode Nornes (caretaker)	12 June 2023
Aalesund	(Norway) Marius Bøe (caretaker)	End of caretaker spell	13 June 2023	16th	(Norway) Christian Johnsen	13 June 2023
Rosenborg	(Norway) Kjetil Rekdal	Mutual consent	16 June 2023	9th	(Norway) Svein Maalen (caretaker)	16 June 2023
Lillestrøm	(Norway) Geir Bakke	Signed by Vålerenga	12 July 2023	8th	(Norway) Simon Mesfin (caretaker)	12 July 2023
Vålerenga	(Norway) Jan Frode Nornes (caretaker)	End of caretaker spell	12 July 2023	13th	(Norway) Geir Bakke	12 July 2023
Lillestrøm	(Norway) Simon Mesfin (caretaker)	End of caretaker spell	10 August 2023	6th	(Norway) Eirik Bakke (caretaker)	10 August 2023
Stabæk	(Norway) Lars Bohinen	Mutual consent	5 September 2023	15th	(United States) Bob Bradley	10 September 2023
Haugesund	(Norway) Jostein Grindhaug	Mutual consent	10 September 2023	12th	(Denmark) Sancheev Manoharan (caretaker)	10 September 2023

== League table ==
Pos	Team	Pld	W	D	L	GF	GA	GD	Pts	Qualification or relegation
1	Bodø/Glimt (C)	30	22	4	4	78	38	+40	70	Qualification for the Champions League second qualifying round
2	Brann	30	19	4	7	55	35	+20	61	Qualification for the Conference League second qualifying round
3	Tromsø	30	19	4	7	48	33	+15	61	Qualification for the Conference League second qualifying round
4	Viking	30	18	4	8	61	48	+13	58	
5	Molde	30	15	6	9	65	39	+26	51	Qualification for the Europa League second qualifying round (Note: Molde qualified for the Europa League second qualifying round by winning the 2023 Norwegian Football Cup.)
6	Lillestrøm	30	13	4	13	49	49	0	43	
7	Strømsgodset	30	13	3	14	37	35	+2	42	
8	Sarpsborg	30	12	5	13	55	52	+3	41	
9	Rosenborg	30	11	6	13	46	50	−4	39	
10	Odd	30	10	8	12	42	44	−2	38	
11	HamKam	30	10	4	16	39	59	−20	34	
12	Haugesund	30	9	6	15	34	40	−6	33	
13	Sandefjord	30	8	7	15	47	55	−8	31	
14	Vålerenga (R)	30	7	8	15	39	50	−11	29	Qualification for the relegation play-offs
15	Stabæk (R)	30	7	8	15	30	48	−18	29	Relegation to First Division
16	Aalesund (R)	30	5	3	22	23	73	−50	18	Relegation to First Division

Source: Football Association of Norway (in Norwegian)
Rules for classification: 1) Points; 2) Goal difference; 3) Goals scored; 4) Head-to-head points; 5) Head-to-head goal difference; 6) Head-to-head goals scored.
(C) Champions; (R) Relegated

== Results ==
Home \ Away	AAL	BOD	BRA	HAM	HAU	LIL	MOL	ODD	ROS	SAN	SRP	STB	STR	TRO	VIK	VÅL
Aalesund	—	0–3	1–3	0–2	0–0	1–1	3–0	0–3	1–0	0–3	3–2	1–1	1–0	2–3	0–4	0–1
Bodø/Glimt	1–0	—	2–2	3–0	2–1	3–1	2–2	2–0	3–2	4–3	2–0	4–0	2–0	0–2	5–1	4–2
Brann	5–1	4–2	—	2–1	3–0	2–2	3–2	2–1	3–1	0–0	1–0	4–1	1–0	2–1	0–2	3–1
HamKam	2–1	4–4	0–2	—	0–3	0–0	0–4	0–1	3–0	2–0	1–1	3–2	2–0	1–2	3–0	0–2
Haugesund	6–1	1–3	0–2	3–2	—	1–0	1–2	2–1	1–2	3–2	0–0	3–0	1–0	1–2	0–2	1–1
Lillestrøm	5–1	1–2	0–2	3–1	1–0	—	2–1	4–4	3–0	4–2	1–2	3–1	4–3	0–1	1–3	2–0
Molde	3–0	1–3	2–0	1–1	1–0	4–0	—	4–1	1–1	5–0	5–1	2–3	3–2	1–4	4–0	0–0
Odd	4–1	0–2	2–0	2–0	1–1	0–1	1–0	—	0–0	3–2	0–3	4–0	1–1	1–2	1–1	2–1
Rosenborg	4–0	1–1	0–2	4–0	1–0	1–2	3–1	3–2	—	1–1	0–3	1–1	1–3	2–1	1–0	1–3
Sandefjord	4–0	2–5	1–1	0–1	0–0	1–0	2–2	4–1	3–2	—	5–1	0–0	2–0	0–0	1–2	1–2
Sarpsborg	3–1	0–2	2–1	2–3	2–1	3–1	1–3	0–0	5–2	6–1	—	2–2	1–2	4–0	1–3	3–2
Stabæk	1–0	0–4	0–1	5–2	3–0	1–0	0–1	0–0	2–2	2–1	1–1	—	0–1	0–1	0–1	2–1
Strømsgodset	1–0	2–0	3–0	0–1	1–2	1–2	1–1	3–1	0–1	1–0	5–2	2–1	—	0–1	1–0	1–3
Tromsø	1–2	2–3	3–1	2–1	2–1	3–1	1–0	0–1	3–1	1–0	2–1	2–1	0–1	—	1–1	0–0
Viking	3–1	3–2	3–1	7–3	2–0	2–0	3–4	3–2	1–5	4–3	2–1	1–0	1–1	3–4	—	1–1
Vålerenga	3–1	1–3	1–2	3–0	1–1	3–4	0–4	2–2	1–3	2–3	0–2	0–0	0–1	1–1	1–2	—

Source: Football Association of Norway (in Norwegian)
Legend: Blue = home team win; Yellow = draw; Red = away team win.

== Relegation play-offs ==
The 14th-placed team in Eliteserien will face the winners of the First Division promotion play-offs over two legs to decide who will play in Eliteserien next season.

6 December 2023
19:00 CET

Kristiansund	0–2	Vålerenga
	Report	Håkans 65'; Juklerød 86'

Kristiansund Stadion, Kristiansund
Attendance: 4,042
Referee: Rohit Saggi
10 December 2023
17:00 CET

Vålerenga	0–2 (a.e.t.)	Kristiansund
	Report	Rakneberg 76'; Broholm 82'
Penalties
Børven (penalty scored); Bjørdal (penalty scored); Ofkir (penalty scored); Ilić (penalty scored); Borchgrevink (penalty missed)	4–5	(penalty scored) Stokke; (penalty scored) Willumsson; (penalty scored) Broholm; (penalty scored) Ulvestad; (penalty scored) Aasbak

Intility Arena, Oslo
Attendance: 10,459
Referee: Svein Oddvar Moen

2–2 on aggregate. Kristiansund won 5–4 on penalties.

== Season statistics ==
=== Top scorers ===
Rank	Player	Club	Goals
1	(Norway) Amahl Pellegrino	Bodø/Glimt	24
2	(Norway) Bård Finne	Brann	16
3	(Nigeria) Akor Adams	Lillestrøm	15
3	(Cameroon) Faris Moumbagna	Bodø/Glimt	15
3	(Norway) Vegard Erlien	Tromsø	15
6	(Norway) Thomas Lehne Olsen	Lillestrøm	14
7	(Norway) Zlatko Tripić	Viking	13
8	(Iraq) Danilo Al-Saed	Sandefjord	11
9	(Norway) Lars-Jørgen Salvesen	Viking	10
10	5 players		9

=== Hat-tricks ===
Player	For	Against	Result	Date
(Norway) Amahl Pellegrino	Bodø/Glimt	Stabæk	4–0 (H)	16 April 2023
(Nigeria) Akor Adams	Lillestrøm	Stabæk	3–1 (H)	4 June 2023
(Norway) Eric Kitolano	Molde	Sarpsborg	5–1 (H)	22 July 2023
(Norway) Amahl Pellegrino	Bodø/Glimt	Vålerenga	4–2 (H)	24 September 2023
(Norway) Jo Inge Berget	Sarpsborg	Rosenborg	5–2 (H)	8 October 2023

== Awards ==
=== Monthly awards ===
Month	Coach of the Month		Player of the Month		Young Player of the Month		References
Month	Coach	Club	Player	Club	Player	Club	References
April	(Norway) Eirik Horneland	Brann	(Norway) Amahl Pellegrino	Bodø/Glimt	(Norway) David Møller Wolfe	Brann	
May	(Norway) Kjetil Knutsen	Bodø/Glimt	(Norway) Bård Finne	Brann	(Norway) Joel Mvuka	Bodø/Glimt	
June	(Norway) Gaute Helstrup	Tromsø	(Norway) Sakarias Opsahl	Tromsø	(Norway) Tobias Gulliksen	Strømsgodset	
July	(Norway) Bjarte Lunde Aarsheim (Norway) Morten Jensen	Viking	(Norway) Zlatko Tripić	Viking	(Norway) Jakob Napoleon Romsaas	Tromsø	
August	(Norway) Bjarte Lunde Aarsheim (Norway) Morten Jensen	Viking	(Slovenia) David Brekalo	Viking	(Norway) Sverre Nypan	Rosenborg	
September	(Norway) Eirik Horneland	Brann	(Norway) Amahl Pellegrino	Bodø/Glimt	(Norway) Magnus Bech Riisnæs	Vålerenga	
October	(Denmark) Sancheev Manoharan	Haugesund	(Denmark) Peter Therkildsen	Haugesund	Not awarded		
November	(Norway) Eirik Horneland	Brann	(Norway) Bård Finne	Brann	(Norway) Magnus Sjøeng	Vålerenga	

=== Annual awards ===
Award	Winner	Club
Coach of the Season	(Norway) Eirik Horneland	Brann
Player of the Season	(Norway) Amahl Pellegrino	Bodø/Glimt
Young Player of the Season	(Norway) Sverre Nypan	Rosenborg

== League attendances ==
Pos	Team	Total	High	Low	Average	Change
1	Brann	228,056	16,832	11,603	15,204	+45.8%^{1}
2	Rosenborg	211,473	21,266	10,705	14,098	+7.7%
3	Viking	193,841	15,900	9,477	12,923	+30.4%
4	Vålerenga	158,123	16,556	7,578	10,542	+21.6%
5	Lillestrøm	112,555	10,540	5,823	7,504	+11.3%
6	Bodø/Glimt	103,216	8,244	5,832	6,881	+16.0%
7	Molde	100,213	10,730	5,431	6,681	+4.6%
8	Strømsgodset	81,504	7,014	4,385	5,434	+11.6%
9	Aalesund	78,017	9,050	4,042	5,201	−5.1%
10	Odd	77,406	8,331	3,844	5,160	+13.8%
11	Haugesund	74,755	8,210	3,416	4,984	+27.7%
12	Sarpsborg	73,987	8,022	3,574	4,932	+3.2%
13	Tromsø	72,683	6,691	2,910	4,846	+61.3%
14	HamKam	62,566	6,500	2,945	4,171	−7.2%^{2}
15	Sandefjord	58,015	6,598	2,689	3,868	+16.1%
16	Stabæk	50,922	4,938	2,214	3,395	+55.0%^{1}
	League total	1,737,332	21,266	2,214	7,239	+26.7%

Updated to games played on 3 December
Source: nifs.no
Notes:
1: Team played last season in 1. divisjon.
2: Reduced capacity for parts of the season due to construction work.
