= Tommy Knarvik =

Norwegian footballer (born 1979)

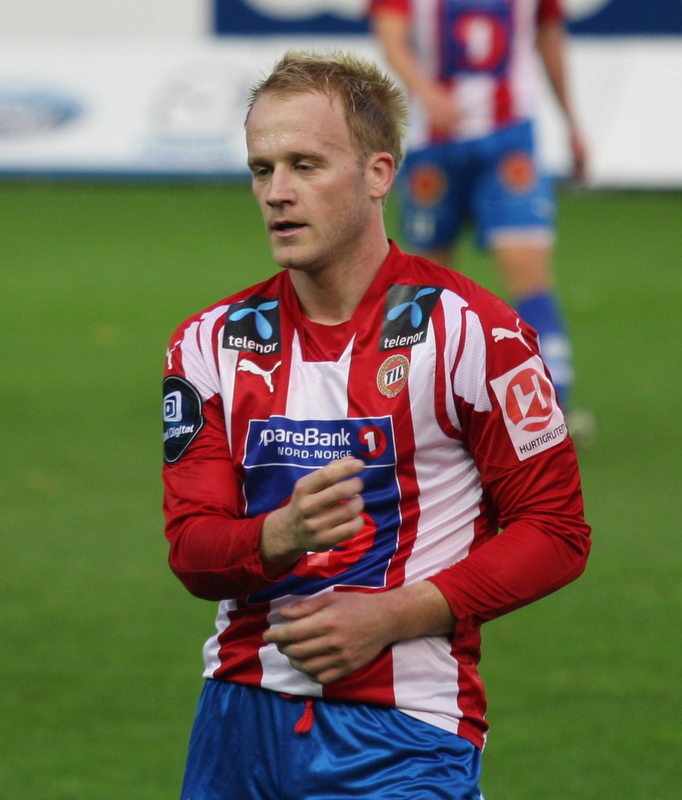

Personal information
- Date of birth: 1 November 1979 (age 46)
- Place of birth: Bergen, Norway
- Height: 1.76 m (5 ft 9 1/2 in)
- Position: Midfielder

Team information
- Current team: Sotra SK (manager)

Youth career
- 1992–1995: IL Skjergard
- 1995–1998: Leeds United

Senior career*
Years	Team	Apps	(Gls)
1997–2001	Leeds United	0	(0)
2000–2004	SK Brann	85	(12)
2004	→ Bryne FK (loan)	6	(0)
2005	Sogndal	16	(1)
2006–2007	Sandefjord	50	(12)
2008–2011	Tromsø	75	(9)
2011–2012	Viking	13	(0)
2012–2014	Bodø/Glimt	33	(8)

International career
2001	Norway U21	3	(0)

Managerial career
- 2014: Nest-Sotra (assistant)
- 2015–2016: Stord IL
- 2017–2019: Sotra SK
- 2021–: Øygarden FK
- * Club domestic league appearances and goals

Tommy Knarvik (born 1 November 1979) is a Norwegian football coach and a former player who is the manager of Øygarden FK.

As a player he came through the academy at Leeds United and also represented Norway U21s at international level.

== Career ==
He most known for his period in SK Brann. In his early years, Knarvik was a junior player at Leeds United, where he won the FA Youth Cup in 1997. He was awarded the title of "Young Player of the Year" at Leeds, despite competition from such players as Jonathan Woodgate and Harry Kewell. Knarvik only made one appearance for the senior team: as a substitute against Portsmouth in the FA Cup on 23 January 1999.

He had a trial at Hartlepool United in November 2000.

After a few good seasons in Brann, his performance dropped. He was loaned out to Bryne FK but the manager there did not offer a regular contract. Brann then let him go, and Knarvik got a chance in the Adeccoliga club Sogndal. Once again, he did not perform as expected and played only one season in Sogndal. He afterwards played for Sandefjord Fotball.

On 14 November 2007 Tromsø announced that they had signed Knarvik on a four-year contract.

He stayed at Tromsø until 14 March 2011, when he signed for Viking FK.

In 2012 he signed for Bodø/Glimt where he played two more seasons before retiring as a player.

== Coaching career ==
Upon resignation he joined Nest-Sotra as assistant manager.

After four months at Nest-Sotra] he left the club after disagreeing with the board and players on the future of the club. From the start of the 2015 season he was appointed manager of Stord Idrettslag. He left the position in September 2016.

== Career statistics ==
Season	Club	League			Cup		Total	
Season	Club	Division	Apps	Goals	Apps	Goals	Apps	Goals
2006	Sandefjord	Tippeligaen	26	8	6	3	32	11
2007	Sandefjord	Tippeligaen	24	4	2	0	26	4
2008	Tromsø	Tippeligaen	26	4	4	1	30	5
2009	Tromsø	Tippeligaen	27	4	4	0	31	4
2010	Tromsø	Tippeligaen	22	1	1	0	23	1
2011	Viking	Tippeligaen	13	0	1	0	14	0
2012	Bodø/Glimt	Adeccoligaen	30	8	4	1	34	9
2013	Bodø/Glimt	Adeccoligaen	3	0	1	0	4	0
Career total			171	29	23	5	194	34

== Honours ==
- Norwegian Cup: 2004
