= Eirik Horneland =

Norwegian footballer and manager (born 1975)

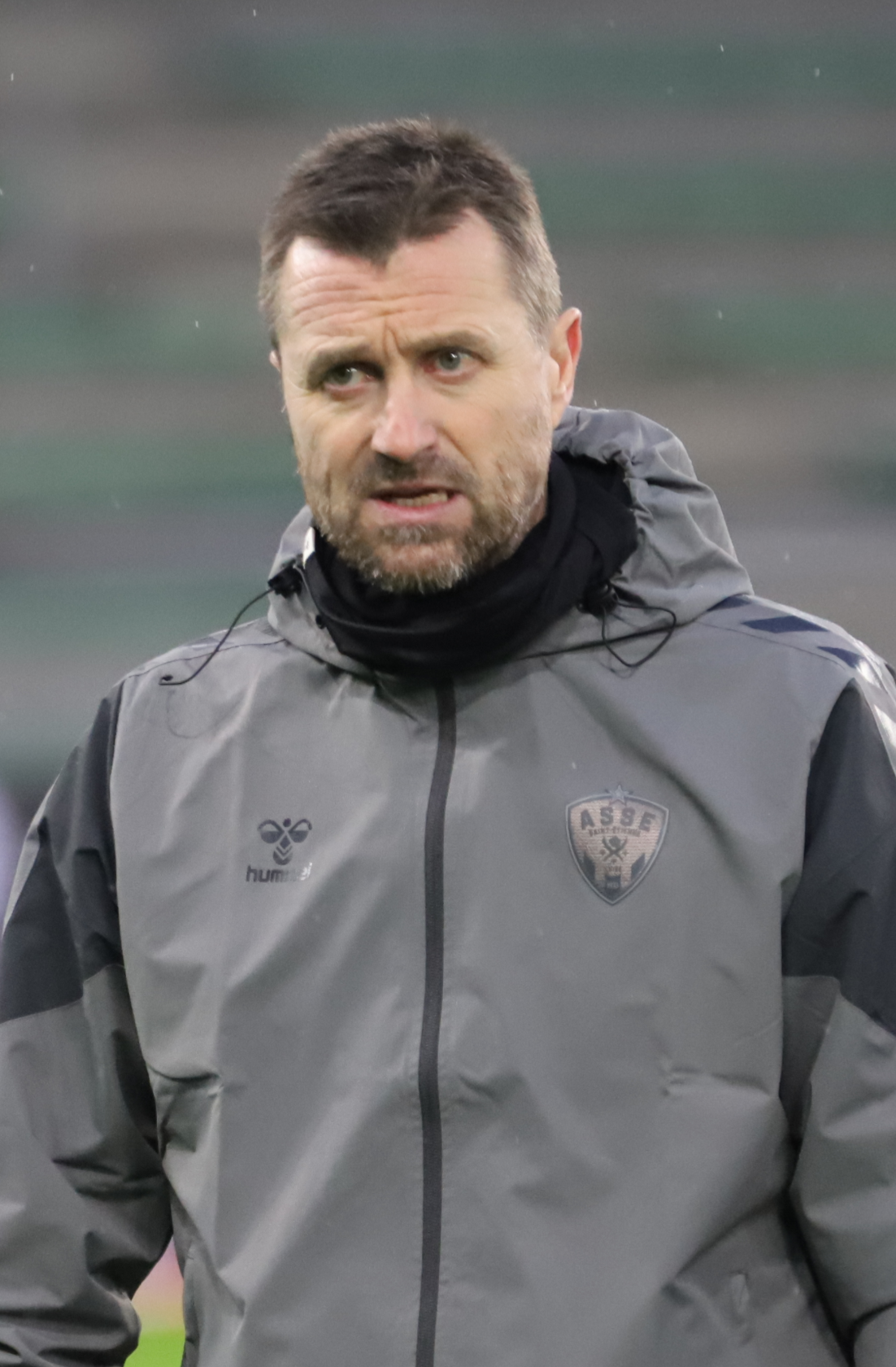
- Horneland with Saint-Étienne in 2025

Personal information
- Full name: Eirik Horneland
- Date of birth: 14 March 1975 (age 51)
- Place of birth: Haugesund, Norway
- Position: Defender

Team information
- Current team: Brann (head coach)

Senior career*
Years	Team	Apps	(Gls)
1993–2005	Vard Haugesund		
2000	→ Haugesund (loan)	3	(0)
2006–2009	Haugesund	87	(4)
Total		90	(4)

Managerial career
- 2015–2016: Norway U19
- 2016–2019: Haugesund
- 2019–2020: Rosenborg
- 2021–2024: Brann
- 2024–2026: Saint-Étienne
- 2026–: Brann
- * Club domestic league appearances and goals

Eirik Horneland (born 14 March 1975) is a Norwegian football manager and former player who managers the Norwegian club Brann. He played as a defender and spent most of his playing years at Vard Haugesund before finishing his career at Haugesund. After retiring as a player, Horneland moved into coaching, first as an assistant manager at Haugesund, before becoming the coach of the Norway national under-19 football team.

Horneland returned to Haugesund as manager in 2016, where strong league finishes earned him a move to Rosenborg in 2019. Horneland resigned from his position after a run of poor results in June 2020 and became assistant manager at Brann in October of that year. He was later promoted to head coach and won the Norwegian Football Cup with the club in 2023. After finishing runners-up in the league two years in a row, Horneland left Brann following the 2024 season and joined French club Saint-Étienne. He left the club in January 2026 by mutual agreement.

== Club career ==
Horneland started his professional playing career at Vard Haugesund in 1993. He spent twelve years at the club, which included a short loan spell at Haugesund, before moving to the latter in 2006. Horneland retired after the 2009 season.

== Managerial career ==
=== Haugesund and Norway U–19 ===
In 2010, he become the assistant manager of Haugesund, whilst occasionally featuring in friendlies for the club and matches with the reserves team. After five seasons at the club, Horneland left to become the coach of the Norway national under-19 football team in 2015.

He returned to Haugesund as head coach in October 2016 and led the team to several strong league finishes.

=== Rosenborg ===
In January 2019, Horneland was appointed as the new manager of Rosenborg. He led the team to a third place league finish in the 2019 season and the group stage of the 2019–20 UEFA Europa League. In June 2020, Horneland resigned from his position shortly after the start of the 2020 Eliteserien due to poor results.

=== Brann ===
On 18 October, 2020, Horneland was appointed as the new assistant manager of Brann. After the sacking of Kåre Ingebrigtsen in July 2021, Horneland was appointed as caretaker manager and later promoted to the role of head coach on 10 August. Following Brann's play-off relegation to the Norwegian First Division in 2021, Horneland led the team to a promotion to Eliteserien in the next season, where they broke the league record for points and goals, and received the league's Coach of the Year award. In 2023, Horneland led Brann to their seventh Norwegian Football Cup title and the play-off round of the 2023–24 UEFA Europa Conference League, where they lost to AZ on penalties. After finishing second in the league for a second year in a row, Horneland left Brann in December 2024.

=== Saint-Étienne ===
On 20 December 2024, Horneland signed with Ligue 1 side Saint-Étienne. He led his first training session on 29 December and managed his first league match with the team on 4 January 2025 in a 3–1 win against Reims.

=== Return to Brann ===
On 2 July 2026, Horneland returned to his former club Brann, signing a contract until the end of the 2030 season.

== Media career ==
During the 2026 FIFA World Cup, Horneland worked as a pundit for the Norwegian broadcaster NRK.

== Managerial statistics (all official matches) ==
As of match played 22 November 2026

Team	From	To	Record							
Team	From	To	G	W	D	L	GF	GA	GD	Win %
Haugesund	15 October 2016	7 January 2019	77	37	14	26	117	91	+26	48.05
Rosenborg	7 January 2019	26 June 2020	51	22	13	16	83	66	+17	43.14
Brann	10 August 2021	10 December 2024	135	85	25	25	342	166	+176	62.96
Saint-Étienne	20 December 2024	31 January 2026	43	16	9	18	78	74	+4	37.21
Brann	2 July 2026	Present	25	14	5	6	52	36	+16	56.00
Total			329	172	66	91	669	431	+238	52.28

== Honours ==
=== Manager ===
Brann

- 1. divisjon: 2022
- Norwegian Cup: 2022

Individual

- Norwegian First Division Coach of the Month: July 2022, September 2022
- Norwegian First Division Coach of the Year: 2022
- Eliteserien Coach of the Month: September 2021, April 2023, September 2023, November 2023, October/November 2024
- Eliteserien Coach of the Year: 2023
