= Florø TIF =

Norwegian sports club

- Full name: Florø Turn og Idrettsforening
- Founded: 1893
- Ground: Florø Stadion
- Location: Florø, Norway

Florø TIF (Florø Turn og Idrettsforening) is a sports club from the town of Florø which is located in Kinn Municipality, Vestland county, Norway. It was founded in 1893. It has sections for athletics, gymnastics, judo, powerlifting, kickboxing, orienteering, volleyball and table tennis.

The athletics section uses Florø Stadion as their home field.
