= Øygarden FK =

Norwegian football club

- Full name: Øygarden Fotballklubb
- Founded: 1 January 2020; 6 years ago
- Dissolved: 2 June 2022; 3 years ago
- Ground: Ågotnes Stadion, Ågotnes
- Capacity: 1,200
- League: 2. divisjon
- 2021: 2. divisjon group 2, 7th of 14
- Website: https://oygardenfk.no/
Home colours	Away colours

Øygarden Fotballklubb was a Norwegian association football club located in Øygarden Municipality, Vestland county. Founded in 2020, they took over the elite license from Nest-Sotra and began playing in the 1. divisjon, the second tier of the Norwegian football league system. Øygarden FK was a cooperation between Øygarden clubs Nordre Fjell, Sund SK, Skogsvåg IL, Telavåg IL, Skjergard IL and Nest-Sotra. In 2019, the clubs agreed to establish a new elite team. The club went bankrupt in May 2022.

== History ==
=== Founding ===
On 26 September 2019, Nest-Sotra announced that they would apply to the Football Association of Norway (NFF) to have their elite licence taken over by the planned club Øygarden FK, effective from the 2020 season. This was approved by the NFF on 31 October 2019. Nest-Sotra stated that economical difficulties played an important role for their decision. Nest-Sotra finished in seventh place in the 2019 1. divisjon, the second tier of the Norwegian football league system, a season where the team was deducted 4 points due to financial problems.

=== Relegation and bankruptcy ===
Bryant Lazaro became the club's first head coach in February 2020. He was sacked halfway through the season, with Mons Ivar Mjelde replacing him. Following a 6–0 loss against KFUM Oslo in December 2020, Øygarden were officially relegated from the 2020 1. divisjon. Tommy Knarvik was appointed new head coach of the club two days later. In the 2021 2. divisjon, the club finished seventh in group 2. In May 2022, Øygarden went bankrupt with a debt of 5.8 million NOK. They officially withdrew their team from all competitions on 2 June 2022.

=== List of seasons ===
Season		Pos.	Pl.	W	D	L	GS	GA	P	Cup	Notes
2020	1. divisjon	↓ 16	30	6	9	15	37	67	27	Cancelled	Relegated to the 2. divisjon
2021	2. divisjon	7	26	10	9	7	41	34	39	Third round	
