= 2022 Norwegian First Division =

Association football season in Norway

Norwegian First Division
- Season: 2022
- Dates: 2 April – 29 October
- Champions: Brann
- Promoted: Brann; Stabæk
- Relegated: Grorud; Stjørdals-Blink
- Matches: 240
- Goals: 789 (3.29 per match)
- Top goalscorer: Bård Finne; Gift Orban (16 goals)
- Highest attendance: 16,617; Brann 3–0 Sandnes Ulf (16 May 2022)
- Lowest attendance: 125; Grorud 1–1 Raufoss (3 October 2022)
- Average attendance: 2,121

The 2022 Norwegian First Division (referred to as OBOS-ligaen for sponsorship reasons) is a Norwegian second-tier football league season.

The league started on 2 April 2022, and is scheduled to end on 29 October 2022, not including play-off matches.

== Teams ==
Locations of the teams in the 2022 Norwegian First Division

In the 2021 1. divisjon, HamKam, Aalesund, and Jerv were promoted to the 2022 Eliteserien, while Strømmen and Ull/Kisa were relegated to the 2022 2. divisjon.

Mjøndalen, Stabæk, and Brann were relegated from the 2021 Eliteserien, while Kongsvinger and Skeid were promoted from the 2021 2. divisjon.

=== Stadiums and locations ===
| Team | Location | Arena | Capacity |
|---|---|---|---|
| Åsane | Bergen | Åsane Arena | 3,300 |
| Brann | Bergen | Brann Stadion | 16,750 |
| Bryne | Bryne | Bryne Stadion | 4,000 |
| Fredrikstad | Fredrikstad | Fredrikstad Stadion | 12,500 |
| Grorud | Oslo | Grorud Match Kunstgress | 1,700 |
| KFUM Oslo | Oslo | KFUM-Arena | 2,000 |
| Kongsvinger | Kongsvinger | Gjemselund Stadion | 5,824 |
| Mjøndalen | Mjøndalen | Consto Arena | 4,200 |
| Ranheim | Trondheim | EXTRA Arena | 3,000 |
| Raufoss | Raufoss | NAMMO Stadion | 1,800 |
| Sandnes Ulf | Sandnes | Øster Hus Arena | 6,043 |
| Skeid | Oslo | Nordre Åsen Kunstgressbane | 2,500 |
| Sogndal | Sogndalsfjøra | Fosshaugane Campus | 5,622 |
| Stabæk | Bærum | Nadderud Stadion | 4,938 |
| Start | Kristiansand | Sparebanken Sør Arena | 14,448 |
| Stjørdals-Blink | Stjørdalshalsen | M.U.S Stadion Sandskogan | 2,000 |

== League table ==
| Pos | Team | Pld | W | D | L | GF | GA | GD | Pts | Promotion, qualification or relegation |
|---|---|---|---|---|---|---|---|---|---|---|
| 1 | Brann (C, P) | 30 | 26 | 3 | 1 | 95 | 16 | +79 | 81 | Qualification for the Europa Conference League third qualifying round and promotion to Eliteserien (Note: Brann qualified for the Europa Conference League third qualifying round as winners of the 2022 Norwegian Football Cup.) |
| 2 | Stabæk (P) | 30 | 16 | 10 | 4 | 62 | 28 | +34 | 58 | Promotion to Eliteserien |
| 3 | Start | 30 | 16 | 6 | 8 | 63 | 38 | +25 | 54 | Qualification for the promotion play-offs |
| 4 | KFUM Oslo | 30 | 15 | 7 | 8 | 61 | 48 | +13 | 52 | Qualification for the promotion play-offs |
| 5 | Sandnes Ulf | 30 | 14 | 5 | 11 | 54 | 52 | +2 | 47 | Qualification for the promotion play-offs |
| 6 | Kongsvinger | 30 | 13 | 7 | 10 | 43 | 37 | +6 | 46 | Qualification for the promotion play-offs |
| 7 | Sogndal | 30 | 12 | 7 | 11 | 55 | 53 | +2 | 43 | |
| 8 | Ranheim | 30 | 12 | 7 | 11 | 49 | 52 | −3 | 43 | |
| 9 | Mjøndalen | 30 | 13 | 3 | 14 | 39 | 47 | −8 | 42 | |
| 10 | Fredrikstad | 30 | 9 | 8 | 13 | 46 | 51 | −5 | 35 | |
| 11 | Bryne | 30 | 9 | 8 | 13 | 42 | 52 | −10 | 35 | |
| 12 | Raufoss | 30 | 9 | 8 | 13 | 35 | 54 | −19 | 35 | |
| 13 | Åsane | 30 | 8 | 8 | 14 | 42 | 67 | −25 | 32 | |
| 14 | Skeid (O) | 30 | 8 | 4 | 18 | 39 | 54 | −15 | 28 | Qualification for the relegation play-offs |
| 15 | Grorud (R) | 30 | 4 | 8 | 18 | 34 | 69 | −35 | 20 | Relegation to Second Division |
| 16 | Stjørdals-Blink (R) | 30 | 4 | 5 | 21 | 30 | 71 | −41 | 17 | Relegation to Second Division |

Source: NFF (in Norwegian)
Rules for classification: 1) Points; 2) Goal difference; 3) Goals scored; 4) Head-to-head points; 5) Head-to-head goal difference; 6) Head-to-head goals scored.
(C) Champions; (O) Play-off winners; (P) Promoted; (R) Relegated

== Positions by round ==
| Team ╲ Round | 1 | 2 | 3 | 4 | 5 | 6 | 7 | 8 | 9 | 10 | 11 | 12 | 13 | 14 | 15 | 16 | 17 | 18 | 19 | 20 | 21 | 22 | 23 | 24 | 25 | 26 | 27 | 28 | 29 | 30 |
|---|---|---|---|---|---|---|---|---|---|---|---|---|---|---|---|---|---|---|---|---|---|---|---|---|---|---|---|---|---|---|
| Brann | 2 | 3 | 2 | 3 | 3 | 2 | 2 | 1 | 1 | 1 | 1 | 1 | 1 | 1 | 1 | 1 | 1 | 1 | 1 | 1 | 1 | 1 | 1 | 1 | 1 | 1 | 1 | 1 | 1 | 1 |
| Stabæk | 4 | 6 | 3 | 7 | 6 | 6 | 4 | 4 | 3 | 4 | 4 | 3 | 3 | 2 | 2 | 4 | 4 | 3 | 4 | 5 | 4 | 3 | 3 | 2 | 2 | 2 | 2 | 2 | 2 | 2 |
| Start | 1 | 2 | 8 | 6 | 5 | 3 | 3 | 3 | 7 | 8 | 8 | 7 | 9 | 9 | 9 | 9 | 9 | 9 | 7 | 8 | 8 | 6 | 6 | 6 | 4 | 3 | 4 | 4 | 4 | 3 |
| KFUM Oslo | 7 | 5 | 6 | 4 | 8 | 9 | 7 | 7 | 5 | 6 | 7 | 5 | 4 | 7 | 7 | 8 | 6 | 6 | 5 | 4 | 3 | 2 | 2 | 3 | 3 | 4 | 3 | 3 | 3 | 4 |
| Sandnes Ulf | 5 | 1 | 1 | 1 | 2 | 4 | 5 | 5 | 4 | 5 | 6 | 9 | 6 | 5 | 4 | 3 | 3 | 2 | 3 | 3 | 5 | 5 | 5 | 4 | 5 | 5 | 6 | 6 | 6 | 5 |
| Kongsvinger | 13 | 8 | 10 | 10 | 11 | 10 | 10 | 11 | 13 | 13 | 12 | 12 | 11 | 11 | 11 | 11 | 11 | 10 | 10 | 9 | 9 | 9 | 8 | 7 | 7 | 6 | 5 | 5 | 5 | 6 |
| Sogndal | 3 | 4 | 4 | 5 | 4 | 7 | 8 | 6 | 8 | 7 | 5 | 6 | 8 | 6 | 6 | 5 | 5 | 7 | 8 | 6 | 6 | 7 | 9 | 9 | 8 | 8 | 7 | 7 | 9 | 7 |
| Ranheim | 16 | 14 | 9 | 8 | 9 | 8 | 9 | 8 | 6 | 3 | 2 | 2 | 2 | 3 | 3 | 2 | 2 | 4 | 2 | 2 | 2 | 4 | 4 | 5 | 6 | 7 | 8 | 8 | 7 | 8 |
| Mjøndalen | 6 | 7 | 5 | 2 | 1 | 1 | 1 | 2 | 2 | 2 | 3 | 4 | 7 | 8 | 5 | 6 | 8 | 8 | 9 | 10 | 10 | 10 | 10 | 10 | 9 | 9 | 9 | 9 | 8 | 9 |
| Fredrikstad | 7 | 9 | 6 | 9 | 7 | 5 | 6 | 9 | 9 | 10 | 10 | 10 | 10 | 10 | 10 | 10 | 10 | 11 | 12 | 11 | 12 | 12 | 12 | 12 | 12 | 11 | 12 | 11 | 12 | 10 |
| Bryne | 12 | 15 | 16 | 16 | 16 | 14 | 14 | 14 | 12 | 12 | 13 | 13 | 13 | 13 | 13 | 13 | 13 | 13 | 13 | 13 | 13 | 13 | 13 | 13 | 13 | 13 | 13 | 12 | 10 | 11 |
| Raufoss | 14 | 12 | 12 | 12 | 10 | 11 | 11 | 12 | 10 | 9 | 9 | 8 | 5 | 4 | 8 | 7 | 7 | 5 | 6 | 7 | 7 | 8 | 7 | 8 | 10 | 10 | 10 | 10 | 11 | 12 |
| Åsane | 15 | 13 | 14 | 13 | 13 | 14 | 12 | 10 | 11 | 11 | 11 | 11 | 12 | 12 | 12 | 12 | 12 | 12 | 11 | 12 | 11 | 11 | 11 | 11 | 11 | 12 | 11 | 13 | 13 | 13 |
| Skeid | 11 | 15 | 15 | 15 | 15 | 16 | 15 | 15 | 16 | 16 | 16 | 15 | 15 | 15 | 14 | 14 | 14 | 14 | 14 | 14 | 14 | 14 | 14 | 14 | 14 | 14 | 14 | 14 | 14 | 14 |
| Grorud | 7 | 9 | 11 | 11 | 12 | 12 | 13 | 13 | 14 | 14 | 14 | 14 | 14 | 14 | 15 | 15 | 15 | 16 | 16 | 16 | 16 | 16 | 16 | 16 | 16 | 16 | 15 | 15 | 15 | 15 |
| Stjørdals-Blink | 7 | 11 | 13 | 14 | 14 | 15 | 16 | 16 | 15 | 15 | 15 | 16 | 16 | 16 | 16 | 16 | 16 | 15 | 15 | 15 | 15 | 15 | 15 | 15 | 15 | 15 | 16 | 16 | 16 | 16 |

| Promotion to 2023 Eliteserien |
| Promotion play-offs |
| Relegation play-offs |
| Relegation to 2023 2. divisjon |

Source: nifs.no

== Results ==
| Home \ Away | BRA | BRY | FRE | GRO | KFU | KON | MJØ | RAN | RAU | ULF | SKE | SOG | STB | STA | STJ | ÅSA |
|---|---|---|---|---|---|---|---|---|---|---|---|---|---|---|---|---|
| Brann | — | 2–1 | 3–0 | 7–0 | 4–1 | 3–0 | 7–0 | 5–0 | 3–0 | 3–0 | 3–0 | 1–1 | 1–1 | 1–0 | 5–0 | 1–1 |
| Bryne | 1–5 | — | 0–2 | 2–1 | 1–2 | 1–1 | 2–1 | 1–2 | 5–0 | 0–2 | 0–3 | 3–3 | 0–0 | 2–0 | 0–0 | 2–1 |
| Fredrikstad | 1–3 | 1–3 | — | 3–1 | 1–2 | 0–0 | 2–1 | 1–1 | 0–4 | 1–2 | 2–0 | 5–2 | 2–4 | 1–0 | 2–2 | 2–2 |
| Grorud | 0–2 | 2–2 | 2–2 | — | 1–3 | 1–2 | 0–1 | 2–1 | 1–1 | 1–3 | 1–1 | 2–0 | 0–4 | 0–3 | 1–2 | 3–1 |
| KFUM Oslo | 1–5 | 3–3 | 2–1 | 2–2 | — | 1–0 | 3–0 | 1–2 | 1–1 | 3–2 | 3–0 | 3–2 | 0–0 | 0–1 | 3–1 | 2–2 |
| Kongsvinger | 1–3 | 2–1 | 0–1 | 2–2 | 3–1 | — | 2–1 | 2–2 | 4–1 | 3–1 | 1–0 | 0–0 | 0–1 | 2–2 | 5–0 | 1–1 |
| Mjøndalen | 3–1 | 2–1 | 2–0 | 3–0 | 2–1 | 1–0 | — | 1–2 | 1–2 | 4–1 | 1–0 | 0–4 | 2–4 | 0–0 | 2–1 | 1–1 |
| Ranheim | 0–4 | 1–1 | 3–2 | 2–1 | 4–1 | 0–2 | 2–1 | — | 3–2 | 1–2 | 4–0 | 3–3 | 0–1 | 2–2 | 2–1 | 3–3 |
| Raufoss | 0–5 | 2–0 | 2–1 | 1–1 | 0–3 | 0–1 | 2–1 | 1–1 | — | 1–1 | 1–0 | 0–3 | 0–4 | 1–2 | 2–2 | 1–0 |
| Sandnes Ulf | 0–3 | 2–1 | 0–4 | 2–4 | 2–2 | 4–1 | 0–2 | 3–2 | 1–4 | — | 0–0 | 6–0 | 2–2 | 3–5 | 0–0 | 6–0 |
| Skeid | 2–3 | 1–2 | 3–3 | 3–2 | 1–5 | 4–0 | 1–2 | 1–0 | 2–2 | 0–1 | — | 2–3 | 2–3 | 3–2 | 3–1 | 2–0 |
| Sogndal | 0–4 | 2–1 | 1–1 | 4–0 | 1–2 | 2–1 | 1–0 | 2–0 | 2–0 | 1–2 | 0–1 | — | 4–3 | 1–2 | 6–1 | 2–3 |
| Stabæk | 1–2 | 2–2 | 0–0 | 1–1 | 2–2 | 1–0 | 2–0 | 3–2 | 2–0 | 0–1 | 2–0 | 0–0 | — | 5–0 | 4–2 | 4–0 |
| Start | 0–2 | 6–0 | 1–0 | 5–0 | 3–2 | 0–1 | 1–1 | 2–1 | 2–2 | 1–2 | 3–2 | 5–1 | 0–0 | — | 3–1 | 4–1 |
| Stjørdals-Blink | 1–2 | 0–2 | 1–2 | 1–0 | 1–3 | 1–4 | 1–2 | 0–1 | 1–2 | 1–2 | 1–0 | 1–3 | 3–2 | 0–3 | — | 2–4 |
| Åsane | 0–2 | 1–2 | 4–3 | 3–2 | 0–3 | 1–2 | 3–1 | 1–2 | 1–0 | 2–1 | 3–2 | 1–1 | 0–4 | 1–5 | 1–1 | — |

Source: NFF (in Norwegian)
Legend: Blue = home team win; Yellow = draw; Red = away team win.

== Play-offs ==
=== Promotion play-offs ===
The teams from third to sixth place will take part in the promotion play-offs; these are single leg knockout matches. In the first round, the fifth-placed team will play at home against the sixth-placed team. The winner of the first round will meet the fourth-placed team on away ground in the second round. The winner of the second round will meet the third-placed team on away ground. The winner of the third round will face the 14th-placed team in the Eliteserien over two legs in the Eliteserien play-offs for a spot in the top-flight next season.

First round
5 | Sandnes Ulf | 0
6 | Kongsvinger | 1

Second round
4 | KFUM Oslo | 1
6 | Kongsvinger | 2

Third round
3 | Start | 0
6 | Kongsvinger | 1

First round

3 November 2022
18:00 CET

| Sandnes Ulf | 0–1 | Kongsvinger |
|---|---|---|
| | Report | Taylor 82' |

Øster Hus Arena, Sandnes
Attendance: 1,518
Referee: Svein Tore Sinnes

Second round

8 November 2022
18:00 CET

| KFUM Oslo | 1–2 | Kongsvinger |
|---|---|---|
| Hestnes 2' | Report | Gerson 49'; Andersen 89' |

Intility Arena, Oslo
Attendance: 1,763
Referee: Kristoffer Hagenes

Third round

13 November 2022
17:00 CET

| Start | 0–1 | Kongsvinger |
|---|---|---|
| | Report | Gerson 88' (pen.) |

Sør Arena, Kristiansand
Attendance: 6,621
Referee: Mohammad Usman Aslam

=== Relegation play-offs ===
The 14th-placed team took part in a two-legged play-off against the winners of the Second Division play-offs, to decide who would play in the First Division next season.

Semifinal
2 | Arendal | 0 | 3 | 3
3 | Ull/Kisa | 1 | 0 | 1

Final
1 | Skeid | 6 | 2 | 8
Arendal | 0 | 1 | 1

2 November 2022
14:00 CET

| Skeid | 6–0 | Arendal |
|---|---|---|
| Buduson 3', 43'; Hoven 54'; Romsaas 56'; Effiom 67', 80' | Report |

Nordre Åsen, Oslo
Attendance: 552
Referee: Steinar Hauge
5 November 2022
14:00 CET

| Arendal | 1–2 | Skeid |
|---|---|---|
| Johansen 79' | Report | Nordengen 61'; Buduson 83' |

Norac Stadion, Arendal
Attendance: 519
Referee: Marius Lien

Skeid won 8–1 on aggregate.

== Season statistics ==
=== Top scorers ===
| Rank | Player | Club | Goals |
|---|---|---|---|
| 1 | (Norway) Bård Finne | Brann | 16 |
| 1 | (Nigeria) Gift Orban | Stabæk | 16 |
| 3 | (Norway) Mathias Rasmussen | Brann | 15 |
| 4 | (Norway) Vegard Erlien | Ranheim | 14 |
| 4 | (Norway) Aune Heggebø | Brann | 14 |
| 6 | (Norway) Martin Ramsland | Sandnes Ulf | 13 |
| 7 | (Norway) Jonatan Braut Brunes | Start | 12 |
| 7 | (Norway) Marcus Mehnert | Ranheim | 12 |
| 7 | (Norway) Nicolay Solberg | Fredrikstad | 12 |
| 10 | (Chile) Niklas Castro | Brann | 11 |
| 10 | (Iceland) Jónatan Ingi Jónsson | Sogndal | 11 |
| 10 | (Norway) Eirik Schulze | Start | 11 |

=== Discipline ===
==== Player ====
- Most yellow cards: 9
  - (Sweden) Jakob Lindström (Fredrikstad)
  - (Norway) Ole Amund Sveen (Mjøndalen)
  - (Norway) Erik Tønne (Ranheim)
- Most red cards: 2
  - (Norway) Nicolai Fremstad (Raufoss)
  - (Ghana) Isaac Twum (Mjøndalen / Sogndal)
  - (Norway) Morten Strand (Stjørdals-Blink)
  - (England) Curtis Edwards (Stabæk)
  - (Canada) David Paulmin (Stjørdals-Blink)

== Awards ==
=== Monthly awards ===
| Month | Coach of the Month | | Player of the Month | | Young Player of the Month | | References |
| Month | Coach | Club | Player | Club | Player | Club | References |
|---|---|---|---|---|---|---|---|
| June | Not awarded | | (Norway) Mathias Rasmussen | Brann | (Norway) Nicolas Pignatel Jenssen | Stabæk | |
| July | (Norway) Eirik Horneland | Brann | (Nigeria) Gift Orban | Stabæk | (Norway) Emanuel Grønner | Sogndal | |
| August | (Norway) Jørgen Isnes | KFUM | (Norway) Robin Rasch | KFUM | (Norway) Petter Nosa Dahl | KFUM | |
| September | (Norway) Eirik Horneland | Brann | (Norway) Mathias Bringaker | Kongsvinger | (Nigeria) Gift Orban | Stabæk | |

=== Annual awards ===
| Award | Winner | Club |
|---|---|---|
| Coach of the Year | (Norway) Eirik Horneland | Brann |
| Player of the Year | (Norway) Mathias Rasmussen | Brann |
| Young Player of the Year | (Nigeria) Gift Orban | Stabæk |
