= Ågotnes Stadion =

Stadium in Norway

- Interactive map of Ågotnes Stadion
- Location: Ågotnes, Norway
- Coordinates: 60.40848°N 4.993892°E
- Owner: Øygarden Municipality
- Capacity: 1,200
- Surface: Grass
- Field size: 105 by 65 metres (114.8 yd × 71.1 yd)

Construction
- Groundbreaking: 1987
- Opened: 1990
- Renovated: 2013–14

Tenants
- Nordre Fjell IL (athletics, association football); Nest-Sotra Fotball (association football)

Ågotnes Stadion is a multi-purpose stadium located at Ågotnes in Øygarden Municipality, Norway. It is the home of Norwegian 1. divisjon club Øygarden and 4. divisjon (fifth tier) club Nordre Fjell. The stadium has a current capacity of 1,200 spectators.

== History ==
Ågotnes Stadion was opened in 1990. Former second tier club Nest-Sotra played their home games at Ågotnes until their elite licence was taken over by Øygarden FK ahead of the 2020 season.

== Attendances ==
This shows the average attendance on Nest-Sotra's home games since their promotion to the 2014 1. divisjon.

†	1. divisjon
	2. divisjon

Attendance
Season	Avg	Min	Max	Rank	Ref
2014	797	569	1,056	10†	
2015	750	518	1,500	13†	
2016–2017	N/A				
2018	315	169	840	16†	
2019	319	184	602	15†	
