= Bryant Lazaro =

American professional football coach

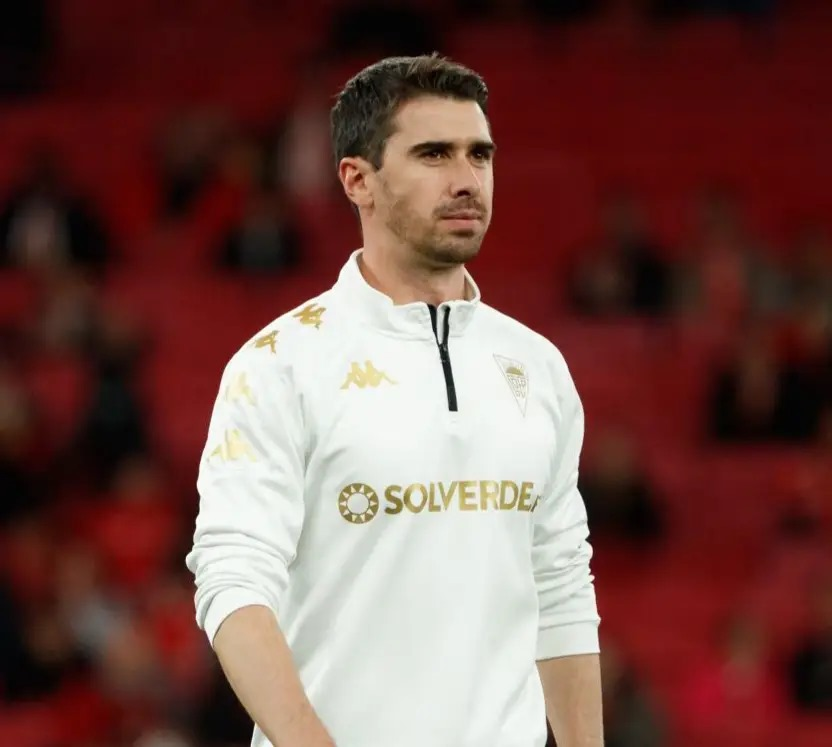

Personal information
- Full name: Bryant Lazaro
- Date of birth: May 23, 1988 (age 38)
- Place of birth: Fort Lauderdale, Florida, United States

Team information
- Current team: Saint-Étienne (assistant manager)

Managerial career
- Years: Team
- 2013–2016: Levante UD (academy)
- 2016–2017: Sevilla U21
- 2018–2019: Tromsø IL 2
- 2019–2020: Alta IF
- 2020: Øygarden FK
- 2021–2022: Deportivo Cuenca (development director)
- 2022–2024: Norwegian Football Coaches Association (coach educator)
- 2023–2024: Vålerenga U19
- 2024–2026: Estoril (assistant)
- 2026–: Saint-Étienne (assistant)

Bryant Lazaro (born 1988) is an American professional football coach who is currently assistant manager at the Ligue 2 club Saint-Étienne.

== Early life and education ==
Lazaro was born in 1988 in Fort Lauderdale, Florida. He holds a Ph.D. in sports science from the UCAM University in Murcia, Spain. As well as two Master's degrees from the Real Madrid Graduate School, including one in talent development in football and an MBA in Sports Management. He also holds a UEFA and CONMEBOL Pro License.

== Career ==
Lazaro began his coaching career in Spain at Levante UD's academy in Valencia in 2012, while he worked as the LaLiga Club's director of international formation, overseeing coach education to foreign entities. In July 2016, he joined Sevilla FC's U-21 coaching staff, which became the sparring squad for the first team, coached by Jorge Sampaoli, Juan Manuel Lillo, and Lionel Scaloni.

In 2018, Lazaro moved to Norway to become the head coach for Tromsø IL 2, the reserve team of Tromsø IL. For the 2019 season, he was appointed head coach of Alta IF in the Norwegian 2. divisjon. During his tenure, Alta IF finished in 6th place.

In February 2020, Lazaro became the head coach of Øygarden FK. Bruce Grobbelaar joined Lazaro's coaching staff in May 2020. Lazaro served as head coach until September of that year.

In July 2021, Lazaro was appointed Head of Football Development at Deportivo Cuenca in the Ecuadorian Serie A, where he oversaw the club's youth divisions and supported the first team for the remainder of the 2021 season.

He returned to Norway in 2022, working as a coach educator for the Norwegian Football Coaches Association, overseeing conferences with Marcelo Bielsa, Quique Setién and José Couceiro. In early 2023, he joined Vålerenga Fotball as U19 and U17 head coach, winning the U17 national league in his first season.

In mid-2024, Lazaro was appointed assistant manager of G.D. Estoril Praia in Portugal's Primeira Liga, working with head coach Ian Cathro.

In June 2026, Lazaro followed Cathro to AS Saint-Étienne in France's Ligue 2, joining the club's coaching staff as an assistant.
