= Melvin Frithzell =

Swedish footballer (born 1996)

Personal information
- Full name: Melvin Tony Frithzell
- Date of birth: August 9, 1996 (age 30)
- Place of birth: Sweden
- Height: 1.83 m (6 ft 0 in)
- Position: Forward

Team information
- Current team: Rosengård 1917
- Number: 15

Youth career
- –2011: Malmö FF
- 2011–2012: Kvarnby IK

Senior career*
Years	Team	Apps	(Gls)
2013–2016	Kvarnby IK		(40)
2017	IFK Värnamo	24	(10)
2018	FC Helsingør	3	(1)
2018	Landskrona BoIS	7	(1)
2019	IK Frej	16	(5)
2019	Örgryte IS	6	(0)
2020	Hødd	14	(6)
2021–2024	Notodden	68	(44)
2024–	Rosengård 1917	11	(1)
- * Club domestic league appearances and goals as of 1 January 2025

Melvin Frithzell (born 9 August 1996) is a Swedish footballer who plays as a forward for Rosengård 1917.
