= Steffen Landro =

Norwegian footballer

Personal information
- Full name: Steffen Pettersen Landro
- Date of birth: 9 October 1985 (age 41)
- Place of birth: Bergen, Norway
- Height: 1.75 m (5 ft 9 in)

Team information
- Current team: 07 Vestur (manager)

Youth career
- Years: Team
- –2002: Øygard
- 2003: Molde
- 2004: Nest-Sotra

Managerial career
- 2014–2015: Nest-Sotra (assistant)
- 2015: Nest-Sotra (co-manager)
- 2016: Nest-Sotra (co-manager)
- 2017–2019: Nest-Sotra
- 2020–2021: Sandnes Ulf
- 2021–2023: Ull/Kisa
- 2024–: 07 Vestur

Steffen Pettersen Landro (born 9 October 1985) is a Norwegian professional football manager. He is head coach of Faroe Islands Premier League club 07 Vestur.

== Club career ==
Landro didn't have a playing career of his own, taking up coaching at a young age, but have played lower leagues for local amateur side Nordre Fjell. As a youth player he trained with Norwegian Premier League sides Brann and Molde, a career halted by injury in his cruciate ligaments.

== Managerial career ==
He started as an assistant for Nest-Sotra in 2014, managing their reserves team and youth team, taking over as co-manager with former player and co-assistant Ruben Hetlevik in May 2015, when the club sacked Danish manager Michael Schjønberg. Due to both Landro and Hetlevik lacking UEFA A Licence badges, Peter Fossmark managed the team from July and the remainder of the 2015 season, which saw them relegated. Landro and Hetlevik returned as head coaches for the 2016 season, finishing second in the Norwegian Second Division.

Landro turned to sole head coach ahead of the 2017 season, managing them to promotion in his first season. In the next season Nest-Sotra finished sixt, losing out in the promotion play-offs in Norwegian First Division, which earned him Manager of the Year Award in that league in 2018.

In the 2020 season, new co-operation club Øygarden FK will replace Nest-Sotra in the Norwegian First Division, while Landro signed a two-year contract with Sandnes Ulf in the same division on 14 November 2019. After being sacked in 2021, he was instead appointed to save Ull/Kisa from relegation to the third tier. Nevertheless, Ull/Kisa were relegated, and did not manage promotion from the 2022 2. divisjon either, following a 2nd place in the league. In July 2023, Landro left the club, stating that the economic situation of Ull/Kisa was different than he had envisioned.

In January 2024, Landro was appointed as manager of Faroe Islands Premier League side 07 Vestur.

== Personal life ==
Landro is also a poker player, and made a living of playing cards for a while, and follows the NBA closely.
