= Florø Stadion =

Sports venue in Florø, Vestland, Norway

Coordinates: 61°35′51″N 5°01′18″E

Florø stadion
- Interactive map of Florø stadion
- Location: Florø, Kinn Municipality, Norway
- Operator: Kinn
- Capacity: 1,370 (seats)
- Record attendance: 2,710 (Florø vs Nest-Sotra, 15 October 2016)

Tenants
- Florø SK (football); Florø TIF (track and field)

Florø stadion is a multi-use stadium in the town of Florø which is located in Kinn Municipality, Vestland county, Norway. It is used for football matches, as the home ground of 2. divisjon team Florø SK, and for track and field meets by Florø TIF.

The attendance record at Florø Stadion is 2,710 and was set in the 2016 2. divisjon match against Nest-Sotra on 15 October 2016. Florø won the game 2–0 and secured the team their first ever promotion to the 1. divisjon, the second tier of the Norwegian football league system.
