= Florø SK =

Norwegian sports club

- Full name: Florø Sportsklubb
- Founded: 12 June 1912; 114 years ago
- Ground: Florø Stadion
- Capacity: 2,800
- Head coach: Gonçalo Pereira
- League: Fourth Division
- 2024: Third Division group 1, 14th of 14 (relegated)
Home colours	Away colours	Third colours

Florø Sportsklubb is a Norwegian sports club from the town of Florø which is located in Kinn Municipality, Vestland county, Norway. It has sections for association football, team handball and swimming.

The club was founded in 1912 as Florø FK. Florø FK was later incorporated into Florø-Varg, founded in 1929. In 1945 Florø-Varg merged with Atgeir, a worker's football club founded in 1931, to form Florø SK.

== Men's football ==
Florø Stadion is their home field. Their team colors are blue and black.

=== History ===
The men's football team currently plays in the 3. divisjon, the fourth tier of the Norwegian football league system. Florø was relegated to the 4. divisjon (fifth tier) in 2005, and promoted back to 3. divisjon in the following 2006 season. They played in 3. divisjon from 2007 to their promotion from the 2013 3. divisjon. In 2014, 2015 and 2016, the team played in the 2. divisjon. Florø won their group in the 2016 2. divisjon and was promoted to the 2017 1. divisjon where they finished in 8th position. In 2018, they were relegated to the 2. divisjon.

=== Recent history ===
Season		Pos.	Pl.	W	D	L	GS	GA	P	Cup	Notes
2001	2. divisjon	↓ 13	26	4	5	17	32	69	17	1st round	Relegated
2002	3. divisjon	8	22	9	3	10	41	42	30		
2003	3. divisjon	7	22	7	4	11	43	56	25	―	
2004	3. divisjon	9	22	6	4	12	33	58	22	―	
2005	3. divisjon	↓ 12	22	2	5	15	28	57	11	2nd qualifying round	Relegated
2006	4. divisjon	↑ 1	16	14	1	1	66	16	43	―	Promoted
2007	3. divisjon	6	22	10	2	10	50	57	32	―	
2008	3. divisjon	7	22	8	5	9	34	48	29	1st qualifying round	
2009	3. divisjon	10	22	6	3	13	36	70	21	2nd qualifying round	
2010	3. divisjon	6	22	9	5	8	30	40	32	1st qualifying round	
2011	3. divisjon	11	26	10	3	13	51	49	33	1st qualifying round	
2012	3. divisjon	2	26	17	3	6	74	35	54	2nd round	
2013	3. divisjon	↑ 1	24	19	4	1	89	26	61	2nd round	Promoted
2014	2. divisjon	6	26	9	10	7	53	49	37	3rd round	
2015	2. divisjon	6	26	11	6	9	43	32	39	1st round	
2016	2. divisjon	↑ 1	26	21	4	1	78	22	67	1st round	Promoted
2017	1. divisjon	8	30	10	8	12	42	46	38	4th round	
2018	1. divisjon	↓ 15	30	8	3	19	27	59	27	2nd round	Relegated
2019	2. divisjon	7	26	9	8	9	36	41	35	2nd round	
2020	2. divisjon	10	13	4	2	7	26	25	14	Cancelled	
2021	2. divisjon	↓ 12	26	5	3	18	29	63	18	2nd round	Relegated
2022	3. divisjon	4	26	15	4	7	53	27	49	1st round	
2023	3. divisjon	8	26	9	3	14	41	65	30		
2024	3. divisjon	↓ 14	26	1	1	24	21	97	4		Relegated

== Florø SK2 ==
In some seasons, a reserve squad, Florø SK2, has been one of the Norwegian reserve football teams to compete in the lower tiers of the Norwegian football league system. While Florø SK2 competed in the 2019 4. divisjon (fifth-level of Norwegian football), as of December 2020, the reserve club's page on the Florø SK official website is blank.
