= Gaute Helstrup =

Norwegian footballer and manager (born 1976)

Personal information
- Full name: Gaute Ugelstad Helstrup
- Date of birth: 15 May 1976 (age 50)
- Height: 1.75 m (5 ft 9 in)
- Position: Midfielder

Team information
- Current team: Malmö

Youth career
- –1990: Krokelvdalen
- 1991–1994: Tromsdalen

Senior career*
Years	Team	Apps	(Gls)
1994–1997	Tromsdalen		
1998–2000	Tromsø	31	(2)
2001	Haugesund	24	(0)
2002–2006	Tromsdalen		

Managerial career
- 2005–2006: Tromsdalen (assistant)
- 2007–2008: Tromsdalen (developer)
- 2009–2010: Tromsdalen (assistant)
- 2011–2018: Tromsdalen
- 2019–2020: HamKam
- 2020–2023: Tromsø
- 2024–2026: Bodø/Glimt (assistant)
- 2026–: Malmö
- * Club domestic league appearances and goals

Gaute Ugelstad Helstrup (born 15 May 1976) is a professional football manager and former Norwegian football midfielder who is the manager of Malmö.

== Career ==
He joined Tromsdalen at the age of 15, made his first-team debut at the age of 18 and played there his entire career. The exception was four seasons in the Eliteserien, in Tromsø and Haugesund.

== Coaching career ==
Helstrup served as assistant coach of Tromsdalen in 2005 and 2006, then player developer. From 2009 through 2010 he was again assistant under Morten Pedersen, then manager. After guiding Tromsdalen to a record-high 7th place in the 2018 1. divisjon he was picked up by Hamarkameratene as their new manager.

In May 2020 he was bought free from his Hamarkameratene contract and signed by Tromsø as manager. In his first season, Helstrup was tasked with bringing Tromsø back to the Eliteserien after their relegation the season prior. With two games left to play of the season, the promotion spot was confirmed with a win over Raufoss. His next two seasons at Tromsø saw the team finishing 12th and 7th in the top flight, before finishing third in the 2023 season, Tromsø's best place in the league for twelve years.

Ahead of the 2024 season, Helstrup was brought in as the new assistant coach of Bodø/Glimt under head coach Kjetil Knutsen. He signed a four-year contract with the club.

== Managerial statistics ==
As of match played 21 November 2026

Managerial record by team and tenure
Team	From	To	Record					Ref.
Team	From	To	P	W	D	L	Win %	Ref.
Tromsdalen	3 December 2010	29 November 2018	246	130	44	72	52.8	
HamKam	29 November 2018	19 May 2020	32	12	5	15	37.5	
Tromsø	19 May 2020	31 December 2023	130	60	37	33	46.2	
Malmö	30 June 2026	Present	20	9	5	6	45.0	
Total			428	211	91	126	49.3	—

== Honours ==
Individual

- Eliteserien Coach of the Month: June 2023
