= Mark Dempsey (English footballer) =

British professional footballer and coach (born 1964)

Personal information
- Full name: Mark James Dempsey
- Date of birth: 14 January 1964 (age 62)
- Place of birth: Crumpsall, Manchester, England
- Height: 5 ft 8 in (1.73 m)
- Position: Midfielder

Youth career
- 1980–1982: Manchester United

Senior career*
Years	Team	Apps	(Gls)
1982–1986	Manchester United	1	(0)
1985	→ Swindon Town (loan)	5	(0)
1986–1988	Sheffield United	63	(8)
1988	→ Chesterfield (loan)	3	(0)
1988–1991	Rotherham United	75	(7)
1991–1994	Macclesfield Town	54	(2)
1998–2002	Radcliffe Borough	178	(18)
Total		201	(17)

Managerial career
- 1997–1998: Alfreton Town
- 2010–2014: Molde (assistant)
- 2014: Cardiff City (assistant)
- 2015: Haugesund (assistant)
- 2016: Haugesund
- 2016: Djurgården
- 2017: Molde (assistant)
- 2017–2018: Start
- 2018: Kongsvinger
- 2018–2019: Manchester United (first team coach)
- 2019–2022: Manchester United (senior academy coach)
- 2022–: Manchester United (under-23 lead coach)
- * Club domestic league appearances and goals

Mark James Dempsey (born 14 January 1964) is an English football coach and former player.

Dempsey was born in Crumpsall, Manchester. He played as a midfielder in The Football League for Manchester United, Swindon Town, Sheffield United, Chesterfield and Rotherham United. He later dropped into Non-League football with Barrow FC, Altrincham FC, Alfreton Town, Buxton FC and Radcliffe Borough amongst others. He was a youth coach with Manchester United before moving to Norway. He has six children, two of them adopted.

== Managerial career ==
In February 2009, he took up a post in youth development with Tromsø and the northern Norway region. On 9 November 2010, Dempsey joined Molde as part of new manager Ole Gunnar Solskjær's backroom staff. He followed Solskjær to Cardiff City in January 2014 as part of a new-look backroom staff after the sacking of Malky Mackay.

=== Haugesund ===
In 2016, Dempsey was Haugesund's manager after taking over from Jostein Grindhaug after the 2015 season. Dempsey resigned as manager of Haugesund on 14 July 2016.

=== Djurgården ===
In August 2016, Dempsey became manager of Swedish top-flight side Djurgården.

=== Molde return ===
On 29 December 2016, Molde announced that Dempsey had returned to the club as an assistant manager, working alongside Erling Moe, on a 2 1/2-year contract.

=== Start ===
On 1 December 2017, Dempsey was appointed manager of Start. On 18 May 2018, Dempsey was sacked by Start due to poor results.

=== Kongsvinger ===
Dempsey was announced as the new manager of Norwegian 2nd tier club Kongsvinger on 11 June 2018.

=== Manchester United ===
Dempsey rejoined Manchester United after the departure of José Mourinho in December 2018 as part of caretaker manager Ole Gunnar Solskjær's coaching staff, taking on the role of a technical coach. In 2019, whilst Manchester United were on their pre-season tour of Australia, Dempsey was struck ill and was admitted to hospital. He was subsequently off work for the next couple of months, before returning to his role in December 2019.

In 2022, he was part of the coaching team that successfully guided Norway's U21s to qualify for the European U21 finals in Romania and Georgia in the summer of 2023.

== Managerial statistics ==
As of match played 11 November 2018

Managerial record by team and tenure
Team	From	To	Record				
Team	From	To	P	W	D	L	Win %
Haugesund	1 January 2016	14 July 2016	19	10	5	4	52.6
Djurgården	3 August 2016	6 November 2016	14	9	1	4	64.3
Start	1 December 2017	18 May 2018	10	1	1	8	10.0
Kongsvinger	12 July 2018	13 November 2018	15	6	4	5	40.0
Total			58	26	11	21	44.8

== Honours ==
Rotherham United

- Football League Fourth Division: 1988–89
