= Christian Johnsen =

Norwegian footballer and manager (born 1977)

Personal information
- Date of birth: 10 June 1977 (age 49)
- Height: 1.85 m (6 ft 1 in)
- Position: Forward

Senior career*
Years	Team	Apps	(Gls)
–1997	Faaberg		
1998–2000	Moss	43	(8)
2000–2003	Raufoss	77	(41)
2004	Örebro	2	(0)

Managerial career
- c.2006: Stabæk (youth)
- 2010–2011: Fram (developer/assistant)
- 2017–2022: Raufoss
- 2023–2024: Aalesund
- * Club domestic league appearances and goals

Christian Johnsen (born 10 June 1977) is a retired Norwegian football striker and current manager.

Joining Moss FK from Faaberg IL ahead of the 1998 season, he played two and a half seasons for them in Eliteserien and then three and a half seasons in Raufoss IL. After finishing second top goalscorer in the 2003 1. divisjon with 17 goals, he transferred to Örebro SK of Allsvenskan. After one season he had to retire following career-ruining injuries, and blamed ÖSK's artificial turf.

Johnsen enrolled at the Norwegian School of Sport Sciences. He also started a career in coaching, first for a Stabæk boys' team, later as player developer and assistant in Fram. At the time he resided in Sandefjord and worked at the Norwegian School of Elite Sport.

In 2017 he became head coach of Raufoss. He soon steered the team to promotion from the 2018 2. divisjon. Stabilizing Raufoss in the 1. divisjon, he resigned after the 2022 season.

In 2023 he was appointed as the new head coach of Aalesunds FK following the departure of Lars Arne Nilsen.
