= Nest-Sotra Fotball =

Norwegian football club

Nest-Sotra
- Full name: Nest-Sotra Fotball
- Founded: 1 January 1968; 58 years ago, as IL Nest
- Ground: Ågotnes Stadion, Ågotnes
- Capacity: 2,000
- Chairman: Ole Kårtveit
Home colours	Away colours

Nest-Sotra Fotball is a Norwegian association football club from Sotra in Hordaland county, Norway. In 2020, their elite license was taken over by the new club Øygarden FK, which is a cooperation between the clubs Nordre Fjell, Sund SK, Skogsvåg IL, Telavåg IL, Skjergard IL and Nest-Sotra all in Øygarden Municipality.

The club was founded on 1 January 1968, and its team colors are green and white. Its traditional base is in Skålvik, but it now plays its matches at Ågotnes Stadion in Ågotnes.

== History ==
The club was founded in 1968 by members of IL Øygard. These members protested against the IL Øygard board's decision regarding who should become the club's new head coach and therefore created a new club called IL Nest. Karstein Lunde was elected as IL Nest's first chairman. The name was changed to IL Nest-Sotra in 1994. They did not play in the league system before 1972 when they lost their debut game 2–3 against Laksevåg TIL.

The team played in the 2. divisjon between 1995 and 1998 and from 2001 to 2003 and after a few years in lower leagues, the team again played in the 2. divisjon in 2008. The club won promotion to the 1. divisjon for the first time in 2013. In 2019, Nest-Sotra decided that their elite license, from 2020 and onwards, will be taken over by the new club Øygarden FK, which is a cooperation between Nordre Fjell, Sund SK, Skogsvåg IL, Telavåg IL, Skjergard IL and Nest-Sotra. The decision was announced by the club on 26 September 2019 and among the reasons for their decision was the club's lack of financial control. During the 2019 season, Nest-Sotra were deducted a total of four points due to financial difficulties.

=== Recent seasons ===
Season		Pos.	Pl.	W	D	L	GS	GA	P	Cup	Notes
2001	2. divisjon	11	26	9	4	13	49	51	31	Third round	
2002	2. divisjon	6	26	12	2	12	48	63	38	Second round	
2003	2. divisjon	↓ 12	26	8	5	13	40	48	29	Third round	Relegated to the 3. divisjon
2004	3. divisjon	1	22	16	4	2	86	24	52	Second qualifying round	Lost play-offs for promotion
2005	3. divisjon	2	22	17	1	4	79	25	52	First qualifying round	
2006	3. divisjon	2	22	17	1	4	80	31	52	First qualifying round	
2007	3. divisjon	↑ 1	22	19	3	0	79	25	60	First qualifying round	Promoted to the 2. divisjon
2008	2. divisjon	10	26	8	7	11	46	52	31	First round	
2009	2. divisjon	10	26	8	5	13	51	77	29	Third round	
2010	2. divisjon	4	26	14	4	8	54	50	46	Second round	
2011	2. divisjon	9	26	9	6	11	51	45	33	First round	
2012	2. divisjon	4	26	12	3	11	50	47	39	Third round	
2013	2. divisjon	↑ 1	26	20	3	3	70	24	63	Second round	Promoted to the 1. divisjon
2014	1. divisjon	12	30	10	7	13	49	51	37	Second round	
2015	1. divisjon	↓14	30	8	7	15	41	51	31	Second round	Relegated to the 2. divisjon
2016	2. divisjon	2	26	19	4	3	83	26	61	Fourth round	
2017	2. divisjon	↑ 1	26	15	9	2	60	22	54	Third round	Promoted to the 1. divisjon
2018	1. divisjon	6	30	12	7	11	43	41	43	Third round	Lost play-offs for promotion
2019	1. divisjon	7	30	14	6	10	43	31	44	Third round	

== Head coaches ==
Nest-Sotra Fotball head coaches from 1993 to present
- (Norway) Atle Sviland (1993–1996)
- (Norway) Karl Fredrik Sande (1997–1998)
- (Norway) Rolf Barmen (1999–2001)
- (Norway) Helge Nilsen (2002–2004)
- (Norway) Petter Fossmark (2005–2006)
- (Norway) Bernt Inge Tørum (2007–2008)
- (Norway) Petter Bakke (2009 – Summer 2011)
- (Denmark) David Nielsen (Summer 2011 – 11 November 2013)
- (Norway) Alexander Straus (2014 – August 2014)
- (Norway) Ruben Hetlevik/ (Norway) Steffen Landro (August 2014 – December 2014)
- (Norway) Michael Schjønberg (January 2015 – May 2015)
- (Norway) Petter Fossmark/ (Norway) Steffen Landro (May 2015 – December 2015)
- (Norway) Ruben Hetlevik/ (Norway) Steffen Landro (January 2016 – December 2016)
- (Norway) Steffen Landro (January 2017 – November 2019)
