= Terra Securities scandal =

Map showing the involved municipalities. Red municipalities are directly involved, while the green have had similar products from Terra Securities

The Terra Securities scandal was a scandal that became public in November 2007. It involved highly speculative investments by eight municipalities of Norway in various hedge funds in the United States bond market. The funds were sold by Terra Securities to the municipalities, while the products were delivered by Citigroup. The municipalities involved were Narvik, Rana, Hattfjelldal and Hemnes in Nordland county, Vik and Bremanger in Sogn og Fjordane county, Haugesund in Rogaland county, and Kvindesdal in Vest-Agder county. All of these municipalities were large producers of hydroelectricity.

The investments were very complicated. They were geared, and they involved high risk through a small upside but a very large downside. Terra Securities, now bankrupt, was a subsidiary of Terra Markets, which is owned 66.73% by Terra-Gruppen, an alliance and co-branding company owned by 78 local savings banks in Norway. The remaining 33.27% was owned by the management of the company. Citigroup is the third largest bank in the United States.

== Background ==
In 2001, Vik municipality found a loophole in the Municipality Act and invested borrowed money in the stock market, by first investing and then seeking permission later. This utilization of the loophole was confirmed by the Norwegian Ministry of Local Government and Regional Development in 2002, because the money borrowed was secured in future income. Vik had borrowed 70 million kr through DnB Markets based on annual payments of NOK 10M, secured through income from hydroelectric power production. This money was then invested in bonds through Terra Securities in 2001 and 2002.

In the same year, in 2001, the four Nordland municipalities of Narvik, Rana, Hemnes, and Hattfjelldal borrowed money to invest in complicated bonds issued by Citigroup and sold through Terra Securities. The municipalities also signed a confidentiality clause with Terra, which ensured that no independent third party could evaluate the quality of the investments. It has been questioned if such a clause, under the circumstances, was legal.

In Narvik's case, part of the capital came from the municipal sale of 50% of Narvik Energi, the municipal power company, in 2002 to DONG Energy and HelgelandsKraft. The other three municipalities had ownership in HelgelandsKraft (Rana 26.8%, Hemnes 7.0% and Hattfjelldal 2.5%) as well as property tax income from power stations owned by Statkraft. These municipalities were investing future income from these sources.

The main advisors in Terra were Knut Anders Opstad and Harald Norberg. They had tried to sell the investments to all municipalities with income from power production by contacting the Association of Norwegian Power Municipalities, but had been rejected by the organization.

== Nature of the investments ==
After the reinvestment in 2007, the municipalities gained a potential upside on their investments of between 0.5% and 3.0% above risk-free placements, but instead risked losing not only their entire investment, but in a worst-case scenario twice what they invested. A total of 451 million kr was invested, but was 'geared' by borrowing an additional amount corresponding to ten times the investment, so that – in reality – the municipalities were actually investing between 4-5 billion kr. In a worst-case scenario the municipalities could lose 900 million kr.

The investment model was so complex that the CEO of Terra Securities could not confirm that even he actually understood how it worked. The deficit from the investment came in late 2007 caused by a credit bubble in the United States.

The investments made by Haugesund involved a placement of 227.5 million kr as a security for Citigroup, in case loans to United States municipalities were defaulted beyond 3.32%; Haugesund would have to pay this to Citigroup. The mayor of Haugesund, Petter Steen jr. claims that he thought the municipality was buying a bond in Statkraft. Instead they were selling such a bond as security for the hedging they were performing for Citigroup.

Total investments in Terra/Citigroup scheme:

- Bremanger Municipality: 170 million kr
- Hattfjelldal Municipality: 103 million kr
- Haugesund Municipality: 220 million kr
- Hemnes Municipality: 84 million kr
- Kvinesdal Municipality: 32 million kr
- Narvik Municipality: 52 million kr
- Rana Municipality: 297 million kr
- Vik Municipality: 38.5 million kr

== Reaction to the scandal ==
After the financial newspaper Finansavisen began reporting the case, and the municipalities suspected that they had been misled, they hired expertise from the law firm Lund & Co. as well the financial advisory firm Pareto. The Financial Supervisory Authority of Norway announced that they would perform an investigation of the case, regarding the legality of the products sold and the information provided by Terra. Minister of Local Government and Regional Development Magnhild Meltveit Kleppa asked the County Governor of Nordland to investigate whether the agreements made were legal according to the Municipality Act.

Terra-Gruppen started an internal investigation, but has since only relocated the two advisors, claiming that top management could not be held responsible for any issues in connection with the products. However, Sverre Leiro, CEO of NorgesGruppen and one of the two independent members of the board of Terra-Gruppen resigned on 23 November 2007, claiming that remaining as a board member could tarnish his and NorgesGruppen's reputation.

On 26 November 2007, Terra announced that they were willing to take the downside of the investments made in 2007 by the four Nordland municipalities, a total loss of 150 million kr. This would result in a net loss for the municipalities of 150 million kr. By 27 November the municipalities had rejected the offer. Local politicians in Narvik feared that they would be forced to sell the remaining stake in Narvik Energi if they could not extract themselves from the agreement with Terra.

On 28 November 2007, the Financial Supervisory Authority of Norway announced that they would withdraw all operating licenses held by Terra Securities. Director of the authority, Bjørn Skogstad Aamo said the reasons were "numerous and serious breaches of requirements for good and correct information to clients". Subsequently, the company filed for bankruptcy and the CEO of Terra-Gruppen, Ola Sundt Ravnestad, announced his resignation. Ravnestad will receive 5.5 million kr in remuneration after he retires from the job.

Due to the bankruptcy of Terra Securities, Citigroup announced, on 30 November 2007, that they would sell the funds on the open market, essentially inflicting a cost of approximately 350 million kr on the municipalities.

On 7 December 2007, Tønsberg District Court gave the eight municipalities arrest in all personal property of the broker Knut Anders Opstad, including his private holding company, Opstad Invest AS. Representatives for the municipalities indicated they would also seek arrest of the other involved parties' property.

On 17 June 2008, Rana Municipality dismissed their Chief Municipal Officer, Jan Reitehaug, and the Financial Director. This was the result of an independent consultant report that concluded that the municipality had breached four paragraphs of the Municipality Act as well as the municipalities' own financial policies. Furthermore, it revealed that the Chief Municipal Officer did not realise that the representatives were brokers — but thought they were merely advisors. The administration also failed to obtain political approval for several of the transactions, and failed to register broker fees because they did not understand what they were.

In August 2008, several of the municipalities announced they were considering taking legal action against Citigroup, in either the United Kingdom or the United States, to hold Citigroup responsible for the losses. On 8 September, the eight municipal councils involved unanimously voted to hold DnB NOR and Depfa Bank liable for their losses, by issuing loans that were illegal according to the Municipality Act. The municipalities will no longer honour the loan commitments, and stop payments. Kjell-Idar Juvik claimed he hoped the banks would be willing to negotiate the matter, and hoped to avoid legal proceedings, but said that municipalities would not hesitate to bring the matter to court. DnB Nor announced that following day that they are considering taking legal action against the municipalities to force them to continue payments.

=== Press coverage ===
The incident has been subject to extensive press coverage with headlines and entire first pages in both local and national newspapers, as well as in-depth research articles in the financial press. TV coverage has involved both news and debate programs on several channels, along with the inevitable ironic comments by comedians in various satirical TV shows.

== Parties involved ==
=== Municipalities ===
- Eight municipalities were involved. It is claimed that they were inadequately informed by Terra Securities representatives of the high risks involved. Also, the legality of furnishing "future expected income" as security for loans has been questioned. The municipalities risk huge losses from their speculative investments. The municipalities have been represented by their mayors:
  - Asgeir Almås (Labour, Hattfjelldal Municipality)
  - Karen Margrethe Kuvaas (Labour, Narvik Municipality)
  - Kjell-Idar Juvik (Labour, Hemnes Municipality)
  - Erik Lidal (Centre, Vik Municipality)
  - Odd Omland (Labour, Kvinesdal Municipality)
  - Petter Steen jr. (Conservative, Haugesund Municipality)
  - Kåre Olav Svarstad (Labour, Bremanger Municipality)
  - Geir Waage (Labour, Rana Municipality)

=== Financial services companies ===
- Lund & Co. (judicial) and Pareto Group (financial)—have acted as advisors for the municipalities.
- Terra Securities (now bankrupt) – sold the funds to the municipalities, allegedly without informing of the true nature of the risk.
- Terra Securities IS—an "inner company". The owners received almost 200 million NOK from this company last year. The role of this company and its relation to the now defunct company Terra Securities ASA is not fully known.
- Owners of Terra Securities (Terra-Gruppen owned by 78 savings banks as well as the executive managers Ola Sundt Ravnestad and Odd Arne Pedersen)—Have received hundreds of million NOK from Terra Securities since the illegal transactions were initiated. They risk legal action from involved parties, and loss of goodwill.
- DnB NOR— Gave loans to the municipalities to make the investments. Legality of loans are questioned.

==== Banks ====
- Depfa Bank— Gave loans to Haugesund and Narvik.
- Citigroup— Issued the bonds to Terra, who sold on the securities to the Norwegian municipalities. While "the risks were clearly conveyed by Citigroup to Terra" (according representatives from Citigroup), the risks of the prospects were allegedly not communicated to the final buyers. The scope of commissions and other remunerations from the purportedly illegal transactions is not known. The letter dated November 27, 2007 from The Financial Supervisory Authority of Norway to Terra Securities ASA, states that "The Supervisory Authority contends that Terra Securities ASA's presentation appears inadequate and misleading, as central elements such as the possibility of potential extra payments and losses, together with the size of these, has been omitted. (...) The material from Citigroup is significantly more detailed than the material from Terra Securities ASA. However, this document also lacks information about crucial risk issues for the municipalities, namely the risk of having to furnish additional security in the form of cash. (...) The Supervisory Authority contends that Citigroup's presentation, as well as the presentation from Terra Securities ASA, appears inadequate and misleading because central elements such as information about potential extra payments and the scope of these are omitted." (translated)
- SEB Merchant Bank— Acted as a broker between Citigroup and Terra Securities, and was initially opposed to the Citigroup funds scheme.

=== Government agencies ===
- Financial Supervisory Authority of Norway— Control authority that withdrew Terra Securities' licence. The Authority is making further enquiries concerning the legality of the conduct of certain persons and parties involved in Terra.
- Norwegian National Authority for the Investigation and Prosecution of Economic and Environmental Crime— The police unit that will eventually charge any parties deemed to have violated Norwegian law.
- County Governor of Nordland— Investigating whether the municipalities have breached the Municipality Act during the investment process.

=== Individual brokers ===
- Harald Norberg and Knut Anders Opstad—The two brokers who actually sold the funds to the municipalities.

== Outcome ==
Terra Securities ASA filed for bankruptcy on 28 November 2007, the day after they received a letter from the Financial Supervisory Authority of Norway announcing the withdrawal of permissions to operate. The letter stated, "The Supervisory Authority contends that Citigroup's presentation, as well as the presentation from Terra Securities ASA, appears insufficient and misleading because central elements like information about potential extra payments and the size of these are omitted."

== Documentary film ==
In 2012, the documentary Finanseventyret, directed by Oddvar Einarson, was released about this situation. Also in 2012, the documentary Når boblene brister, directed by Hans Petter Moland, was released on the same topic.
