= 2016 Tippeligaen =

72nd season of top-tier football league in Norway

Tippeligaen
- Season: 2016
- Dates: 11 March – 6 November
- Champions: Rosenborg; 24th title
- Relegated: Bodø/Glimt; Start
- Champions League: Rosenborg
- Europa League: Brann; Odd; Haugesund
- Matches: 240
- Goals: 653 (2.72 per match)
- Top goalscorer: Christian Gytkjær (19 goals)
- Biggest home win: Aalesund 6–0 Tromsø (24 April 2016); Brann 6–0 Aalesund (22 July 2016); Rosenborg 6–0 Haugesund (23 July 2016)
- Biggest away win: Start 0–5 Stabæk (29 May 2016)
- Highest scoring: Bodø/Glimt 3–4 Haugesund (20 April 2016); Rosenborg 5–2 Sarpsborg 08 (9 July 2016); Lillestrøm 3–4 Rosenborg (6 August 2016)
- Longest winning run: Rosenborg (6 games)
- Longest unbeaten run: Rosenborg (26 games)
- Longest winless run: Start (24 games)
- Longest losing run: Bodø/Glimt (6 games)
- Highest attendance: 21,298; Rosenborg 3–1 Molde (28 May 2016)
- Lowest attendance: 2,375; Sogndal 0–2 Strømsgodset (23 October 2016)
- Average attendance: 6,971 ▲3.9%

The 2016 Tippeligaen was the 72nd completed season of top-tier football in Norway. The competition began on 11 March 2016. Due to the 2016 UEFA European Championship, there was a break between the rounds played on 29 May and 3 July. The decisive matches of the home-and-away season were played on 6 November 2016. A promotion/relegation play-off between the third-from-bottom team of the Tippeligaen and the winner of the promotion play-offs of the 2016 1. divisjon was contested on 30 November and 4 December 2016.

The league was contested by 16 teams: the 13 best teams of the 2015 season; the two teams who won direct promotion from the 2015 1. divisjon, Sogndal and Brann; and Start, who won the promotion/relegation play-off finals against Jerv.

The 2016 season was the last season the league was named Tippeligaen. The league changed its name to Eliteserien ahead of the 2017 season, a non-sponsor affiliated name controlled by the Football Association of Norway.

== Teams ==
Sixteen teams competed in the league – the top fourteen teams from the previous season, and two teams promoted from 1. divisjon.

=== Stadia and locations ===
Locations of the teams in 2016 Tippeligaen

Note: Table lists in alphabetical order.

Team	Ap.	Location	Arena	Turf	Capacity
Aalesund	15	Ålesund	Color Line Stadion	Artificial	10,778
Bodø/Glimt	22	Bodø	Aspmyra Stadion	Artificial	7,354
Brann	59	Bergen	Brann Stadion	Natural	17,686
Haugesund	10	Haugesund	Haugesund Stadion	Natural	8,754
Lillestrøm	53	Lillestrøm	Åråsen Stadion	Natural	12,250
Molde	40	Molde	Aker Stadion	Artificial	11,800
Odd	35	Skien	Skagerak Arena	Artificial	12,500
Rosenborg	53	Trondheim	Lerkendal Stadion	Natural	21,405
Sarpsborg 08	5	Sarpsborg	Sarpsborg Stadion	Artificial	4,700
Sogndal	17	Sogndalsfjøra	Fosshaugane Campus	Artificial	5,539
Stabæk	20	Bærum	Nadderud Stadion	Natural	7,000
Start	40	Kristiansand	Sør Arena	Artificial	14,563
Strømsgodset	29	Drammen	Marienlyst Stadion	Artificial	8,935
Tromsø	29	Tromsø	Alfheim Stadion	Artificial	6,859
Vålerenga	56	Oslo	Ullevaal Stadion	Natural	28,000
Viking	67	Stavanger	Viking Stadion	Natural	16,300

=== Personnel and kits ===
Team	Manager	Kit manufacturer	Sponsor
Aalesund	(Norway) Trond Fredriksen	Umbro	Sparebanken Møre
Brann	(Norway) Lars Arne Nilsen	Hummel	Sparebanken Vest
Bodø/Glimt	(Norway) Aasmund Bjørkan	Diadora	Sparebanken Nord-Norge
Haugesund	(Italy) Andrea Loberto	Macron	Sparebanken Vest
Lillestrøm	(Norway) Arne Erlandsen	Legea	DNB ASA
Molde	(Norway) Ole Gunnar Solskjær	Nike	Sparebanken Møre
Odd	(Norway) Dag-Eilev Fagermo	New Balance	Skagerak Energi
Rosenborg	(Norway) Kåre Ingebrigtsen	Adidas	SpareBank 1 SMN
Sarpsborg 08	(Norway) Geir Bakke	Select	Borregaard
Sogndal	(Norway) Eirik Bakke	Umbro	Sparebanken Vest
Stabæk	(Spain) Antoni Ordinas	Adidas	SpareBank 1 Oslo Akershus
Start	(Norway) Steinar Pedersen	Umbro	Sparebanken Sør
Strømsgodset	(Norway) Tor Ole Skullerud	Puma	DNB ASA
Tromsø	(Norway) Bård Flovik	Select	Sparebanken Nord-Norge
Vålerenga	(Norway) Kjetil Rekdal	Umbro	DNB
Viking	(Sweden) Kjell Jonevret	Diadora	Lyse Energi

=== Managerial changes ===
Team	Outgoing manager	Manner of departure	Date of vacancy	Table	Incoming manager	Date of appointment	Table
Stabæk	(United States) Bob Bradley	Contract expired	10 November 2015	Pre-season	(Scotland) Billy McKinlay	30 November 2015	Pre-season
Bodø/Glimt	(Norway) Jan Halvor Halvorsen	Contract expired	18 November 2015	Pre-season	(Norway) Aasmund Bjørkan	18 November 2015	Pre-season
Start	(Norway) Bård Borgersen	Contract expired	31 December 2015	Pre season	(Norway) Steinar Pedersen	1 January 2016	Pre season
Haugesund	(Norway) Jostein Grindhaug	Contract expired	31 December 2015	Pre season	(England) Mark Dempsey	1 January 2016	Pre season
Stabæk	(Scotland) Billy McKinlay	Resigned	8 July 2016	15th	(Spain) Antoni Ordinas	8 July 2016	15th
Haugesund	(England) Mark Dempsey	Resigned	14 July 2016	6th	(Italy) Andrea Loberto	14 July 2016	6th
Lillestrøm	(Iceland) Rúnar Kristinsson	Sacked	18 September 2016	15th	(Norway) Arne Erlandsen	19 September 2016	15th
Strømsgodset	(Norway) Bjørn Petter Ingebretsen	Resigned	13 October 2016	8th	(Norway) Tor Ole Skullerud	18 October 2016	8th
Vålerenga	(Norway) Kjetil Rekdal	Structural changes	21 October 2016	11th	(Norway) Ronny Deila	21 October 2016	11th

== League table ==
Pos	Team	Pld	W	D	L	GF	GA	GD	Pts	Qualification or relegation
1	Rosenborg (C)	30	21	6	3	65	25	+40	69	Qualification for the Champions League second qualifying round (Note: Rosenborg qualified for the Europa League second qualifying round by winning the 2016 Norwegian Cup. However, since they already qualified for European competition based on their league position, the spot awarded to the cup winners was passed down the league.)
2	Brann	30	16	6	8	42	27	+15	54	Qualification for the Europa League second qualifying round
3	Odd	30	15	6	9	44	35	+9	51	Qualification for the Europa League first qualifying round
4	Haugesund	30	12	10	8	47	43	+4	46	Qualification for the Europa League first qualifying round
5	Molde	30	13	6	11	48	42	+6	45	
6	Sarpsborg 08	30	12	9	9	35	37	−2	45	
7	Strømsgodset	30	12	8	10	44	40	+4	44	
8	Viking	30	12	7	11	33	35	−2	43	
9	Aalesund	30	12	6	12	46	51	−5	42	
10	Vålerenga	30	10	8	12	41	39	+2	38	
11	Sogndal	30	8	12	10	33	37	−4	36	
12	Lillestrøm	30	8	10	12	45	50	−5	34	
13	Tromsø	30	9	7	14	36	46	−10	34	
14	Stabæk (O)	30	8	7	15	35	42	−7	31	Qualification for the relegation play-offs
15	Bodø/Glimt (R)	30	8	6	16	36	45	−9	30	Relegation to First Division
16	Start (R)	30	2	10	18	23	59	−36	16	Relegation to First Division

Source: Football Association of Norway (in Norwegian), Soccerway
Rules for classification: 1) Points; 2) Goal difference; 3) Goals scored; 4) Head-to-head points; 5) Head-to-head goal difference; 6) Head-to-head away goals scored (between two teams).
(C) Champions; (O) Play-off winners; (R) Relegated

== Positions by round ==
Team ╲ Round	1	2	3	4	5	6	7	8	9	10	11	12	13	14	15	16	17	18	19	20	21	22	23	24	25	26	27	28	29	30
Rosenborg	12	6	5	1	1	1	1	1	1	1	1	1	1	1	1	1	1	1	1	1	1	1	1	1	1	1	1	1	1	1
Brann	6	9	6	4	5	4	4	5	5	6	6	7	6	7	4	5	4	3	3	3	3	4	4	2	2	2	2	2	2	2
Odd	4	5	7	3	2	3	2	2	2	3	2	3	2	2	2	2	2	2	2	2	2	2	2	3	3	3	3	3	3	3
Haugesund	3	1	4	9	7	5	5	7	7	4	5	5	7	5	6	4	5	6	5	5	4	3	3	4	4	5	5	4	5	4
Molde	9	4	2	2	3	2	3	3	3	2	3	2	3	6	7	7	8	9	8	8	7	5	5	5	6	4	4	6	4	5
Sarpsborg 08	13	14	13	15	16	11	9	9	9	9	9	9	8	8	8	8	6	5	6	6	5	6	6	7	5	6	6	5	6	6
Strømsgodset	7	13	8	11	8	6	6	4	4	5	4	4	4	3	3	3	3	4	4	4	6	7	7	8	7	8	8	7	7	7
Viking	2	3	3	6	4	7	8	8	6	8	7	6	5	4	5	6	7	7	7	7	8	8	8	6	8	7	7	8	8	8
Aalesund	5	8	11	14	15	14	10	12	13	14	14	12	12	12	14	14	15	15	14	14	15	15	14	13	12	10	10	9	9	9
Vålerenga	16	16	16	16	13	15	13	14	11	11	12	14	13	14	15	15	13	13	10	10	10	9	9	10	10	11	11	11	11	10
Sogndal	15	7	9	7	9	10	12	11	10	10	10	10	10	9	9	9	9	8	9	9	9	10	10	9	9	9	9	10	10	11
Lillestrøm	8	10	14	10	10	8	7	6	8	7	8	8	9	10	10	11	10	11	12	11	12	13	13	15	15	15	14	12	12	12
Tromsø	11	12	10	8	11	12	14	10	12	12	13	11	11	11	11	12	12	10	11	12	11	12	12	11	11	13	13	14	13	13
Stabæk	14	15	15	13	12	13	15	15	15	15	15	15	15	15	13	13	14	14	15	15	14	14	15	14	13	14	15	15	15	14
Bodø/Glimt	1	2	1	5	6	9	11	13	14	13	11	13	14	13	12	10	11	12	13	13	13	11	11	12	14	12	12	13	14	15
Start	10	11	12	12	14	16	16	16	16	16	16	16	16	16	16	16	16	16	16	16	16	16	16	16	16	16	16	16	16	16

Leader
2017–18 UEFA Europa League first qualifying round
Relegation play-offs
Relegation to 2017 1. divisjon

Source: nifs.no

== Results ==
Home \ Away	AAL	BOD	SKB	HAU	LSK	MFK	ODD	RBK	S08	SIL	STB	IKS	SIF	TIL	VIF	VIK
Aalesund	—	1–0	1–2	3–3	2–0	0–2	1–0	1–1	2–2	1–4	1–0	1–1	4–2	6–0	2–2	1–2
Bodø/Glimt	0–1	—	1–3	3–4	1–1	1–2	2–1	0–0	0–2	2–0	3–1	2–0	4–2	0–3	0–0	0–2
Brann	6–0	1–0	—	1–0	1–2	2–1	0–0	1–1	2–1	2–0	1–0	1–0	1–0	1–0	4–1	0–0
Haugesund	3–0	2–1	3–2	—	2–2	3–3	3–1	1–1	1–1	0–1	3–1	2–1	1–1	2–1	1–1	4–1
Lillestrøm	1–1	1–1	1–0	1–1	—	1–0	2–4	3–4	4–0	1–2	1–2	1–1	2–0	2–4	2–0	1–2
Molde	1–0	3–2	2–0	0–0	4–2	—	4–2	1–3	0–1	0–0	3–0	2–2	4–2	1–1	4–0	0–1
Odd	4–1	2–1	1–3	2–1	1–3	2–0	—	1–0	0–0	3–1	0–1	3–0	2–1	0–0	1–2	2–2
Rosenborg	1–0	2–1	3–0	6–0	2–1	3–1	1–2	—	5–2	3–1	3–1	2–0	1–0	3–1	3–1	4–0
Sarpsborg 08	1–0	1–2	1–0	0–1	3–0	4–0	0–0	2–2	—	0–0	1–1	1–0	1–0	2–2	0–2	1–0
Sogndal	2–4	2–2	0–0	1–0	2–2	4–3	0–1	1–1	3–0	—	1–1	2–2	0–1	0–0	1–0	1–2
Stabæk	3–0	1–0	1–1	0–1	1–2	1–2	1–2	0–2	1–2	0–1	—	3–0	0–1	0–3	2–1	1–0
Start	1–4	1–4	1–2	1–0	1–1	1–1	1–2	0–2	1–4	1–1	0–5	—	2–2	2–1	2–4	0–1
Strømsgodset	4–2	2–0	2–2	2–0	3–1	0–2	1–1	2–0	4–0	2–1	2–2	1–1	—	1–0	3–2	1–1
Tromsø	1–2	1–2	1–0	2–2	2–1	0–2	3–1	1–2	1–2	2–0	2–2	0–0	2–0	—	0–3	2–1
Vålerenga	0–1	1–1	3–2	0–1	1–1	3–0	0–1	0–2	3–0	1–1	1–1	2–0	1–1	4–0	—	0–2
Viking	2–3	2–0	0–1	3–2	2–2	1–0	0–2	0–2	0–0	0–0	2–2	2–0	0–1	2–0	0–2	—

Source: NIFS (in Norwegian)
Legend: Blue = home team win; Yellow = draw; Red = away team win.

== Relegation play-offs ==
The 14th-placed team, Stabæk, took part in a two-legged play-off against Jerv, the winners of the 2016 1. divisjon promotion play-offs, to decide who would play in the 2017 Eliteserien.

30 November 2016
12:00 CET (UTC+1)

Jerv	1–0	Stabæk
Ogungbaro 76'	Report

Levermyr Stadion, Grimstad
Attendance: 1,750
Referee: Dag Roger Nebben
4 December 2016
18:00 CET (UTC+1)

Stabæk	2–0	Jerv
Omoijuanfo 83', 85'	Report

Nadderud Stadion, Bærum
Attendance: 4,528
Referee: Svein Oddvar Moen

Stabæk won 2–1 on aggregate and retained their place in the 2017 Eliteserien; Jerv remained in the 1. divisjon.

== Season statistics ==
=== Top scorers ===
Rank	Player	Club	Goals	Games	Average
1	(Denmark) Christian Gytkjær	Rosenborg	19	28	0,68
2	(Norway) Mos	Aalesund	13	29	0,45
3	(Norway) Fitim Azemi	Bodø/Glimt	11	29	0,38
4	(Canada) Olivier Occéan	Odd	10	28	0,36
4	(Norway) Torbjørn Agdestein	Haugesund	10	30	0,33
6	(Nigeria) Fred Friday	Lillestrøm	8	14	0,57
6	(Norway) Marcus Pedersen	Strømsgodset	8	19	0,42
6	(Norway) Ghayas Zahid	Vålerenga	8	28	0,29
6	(Denmark) Mike Jensen	Rosenborg	8	28	0,29
6	(Norway) Thomas Lehne Olsen	Tromsø	8	30	0,27

=== Hat-tricks ===
Player	For	Against	Result	Date
(Norway) Kristoffer Tokstad	Sarpsborg 08	Start	4–1 (A)	21 April 2016
(Norway) Mos	Aalesund	Tromsø	6–0 (H)	24 April 2016
(Denmark) Christian Gytkjær	Rosenborg	Lillestrøm	4–3 (A)	6 August 2016
(Norway) Espen Ruud	Odd	Lillestrøm	4–2 (A)	11 September 2016

Notes

(H) – Home team
(A) – Away team

=== Discipline ===
==== Player ====
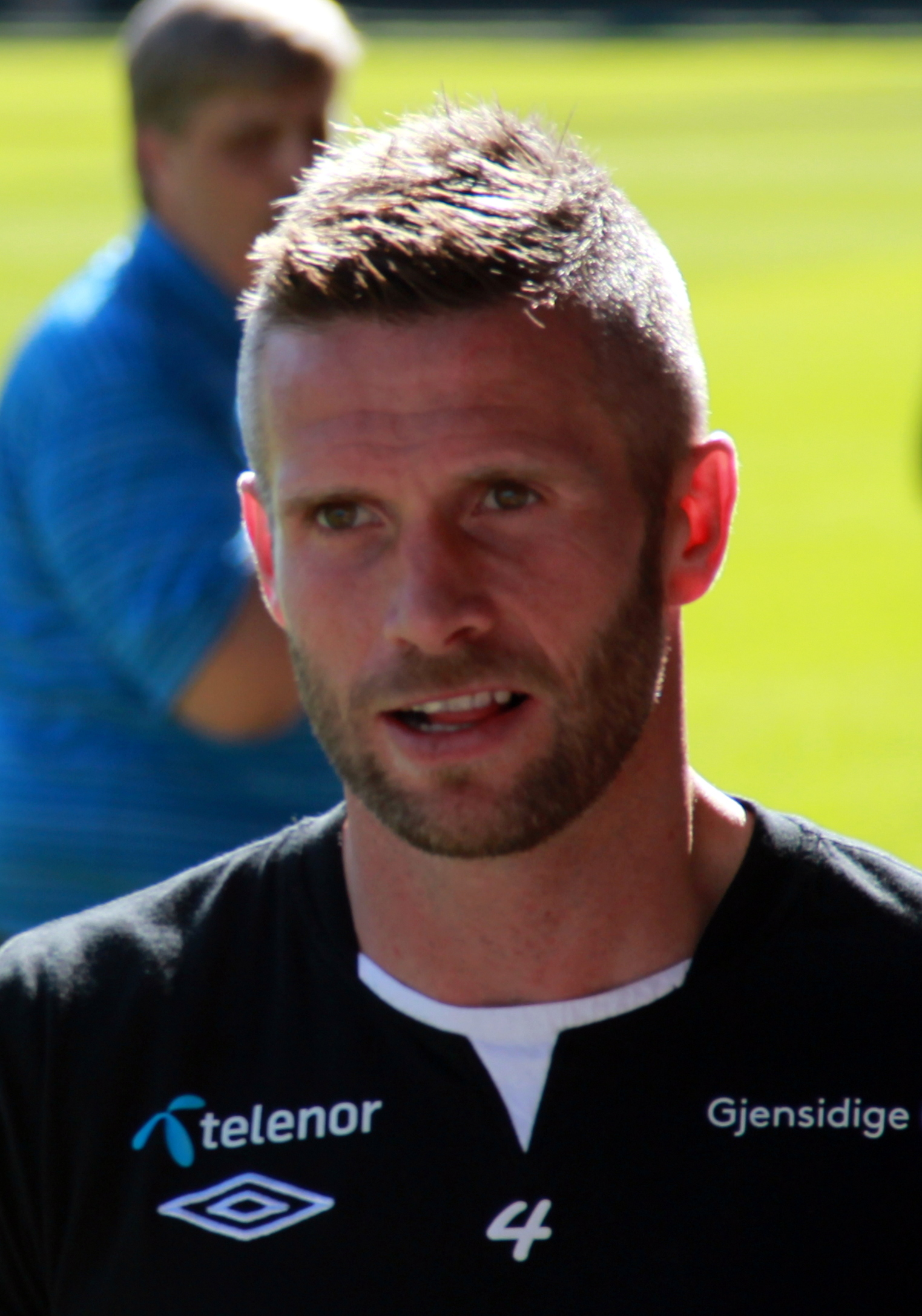
Kjetil Wæhler received the most yellow cards this season with 10.

- Most yellow cards: 10
  - (Norway) Kjetil Wæhler (Vålerenga)
- Most red cards: 2
  - (Guinea-Bissau) Francisco Júnior (Strømsgodset)
  - (Norway) Frode Kippe (Lillestrøm)

==== Club ====
- Most yellow cards: 56
  - Brann
- Most red cards: 4
  - Strømsgodset

=== Attendances ===
Pos	Team	Total	High	Low	Average	Change
1	Rosenborg	263,781	21,298	14,142	17,585	−2.5%
2	Brann	185,703	17,686	9,331	12,380	+22.3%
3	Vålerenga	136,106	19,038	6,379	9,074	−10.1%
4	Viking	132,195	11,347	7,069	8,813	−14.2%
5	Molde	125,886	11,348	7,459	8,392	−6.3%
6	Odd	120,582	10,678	6,440	8,039	+1.6%
7	Strømsgodset	102,392	7,661	6,095	6,826	−2.9%
8	Aalesund	95,546	10,013	5,215	6,370	−4.9%
9	Lillestrøm	87,836	9,085	4,081	5,856	+5.9%
10	Haugesund	78,183	7,722	4,081	5,212	−3.2%
11	Start	66,985	7,273	3,401	4,466	−27.4%
12	Tromsø	56,787	6,429	3,118	4,056	+11.6%
13	Sarpsborg 08	58,148	5,107	3,296	3,877	+0.2%
14	Stabæk	57,130	4,938	3,052	3,809	−1.8%
15	Bodø/Glimt	55,023	7,564	2,398	3,668	+15.2%
16	Sogndal	47,152	5,600	2,375	3,143	+9.2%
	League total	1,673,113	21,298	2,375	6,971	+3.9%

Updated to games played on 6 November 2016
Source: nifs.no, fotball.no

== Awards ==
=== Annual awards ===
Award	Winner	Club
Player of the Year	(Denmark) Mike Jensen	Rosenborg
Goalkeeper of the Year	(Poland) Piotr Leciejewski	Brann
Defender of the Year	(Norway) Jonas Svensson	Rosenborg
Midfielder of the Year	(Denmark) Mike Jensen	Rosenborg
Striker of the Year	(Denmark) Christian Gytkjær	Rosenborg
Manager of the Year	(Norway) Lars Arne Nilsen	Brann
Young Player of the Year	(Norway) Sander Berge	Vålerenga
