= Norne Securities =

Norwegian investment bank

Norne Securities AS
- Company type: Private/AS
- Industry: Financial services
- Founded: 3 July 2008; 17 years ago in Bergen, Norway
- Headquarters: Oslo & Bergen, Norway
- Area served: Norway
- Key people: Erik Valen (CEO); Stein Andreas Hannevik (Chairman)
- Total assets: NOR 400 billion (2017)
- Owner: Norne Ownership Company AS
- Number of employees: 43 (2026)
- Subsidiaries: Terra Markets
- Website: norne.no

Norne Securities AS is a Norwegian investment bank. The firm has total assets of over NOK 400 billion, 170 offices and 660,000 customers.

== History ==
- In 2008, Norne Securities was founded in Bergen, Norway by 15 independent Norwegian savings banks
- In 2012, Norne Securities acquired Terra Markets from Norwegian savings bank, Eika Gruppen

== Ownership ==
Norne Securities is owned by 15 independent Norwegian savings banks

Name	Ownership percentage
Sparebanken Vest	47.58%
Sparebanken Sør	17.08%
Fana Sparebank	9.71%
Helgeland Sparebank	7.47%
Must Invest AS	2.90%
Sparebanken East	2.48%
Spareskillingsbanken	2.24%
Voss Sparebank	2.02%
Haugesund Sparebank	1.94%
Flekkefjord Sparebank	1.49%
Søgne and Greipstad Sparebank	1.49%
Skudenes & Aakra Sparebank	1.49%
Lillesands Sparebank	0.75%
Luster Sparebank	0.75%
Etne Sparebank	0.60%
