= Terra Securities =

Norwegian financial services company

Terra Securities ASA
- Company type: ASA/Subsidiary
- Industry: Financial services
- Founded: 1997; 29 years ago
- Defunct: 2007; 19 years ago
- Fate: Bankruptcy
- Headquarters: Oslo, Norway
- Area served: Norway
- Key people: Svein Erik Nordang (CEO); Gabriel Block-Watne (Chairman)
- Operating income: NOK 384 million
- Net income: NOK 179 million
- Number of employees: 63 (2007)
- Parent: Terra Markets (Norne Securities)

Terra Securities ASA was a Norwegian security company that sold various financial instruments, index options, hedge funds and other investment securities through 78 local savings banks that are members of Terra-Gruppen. In 2006 it had a market share of 1.92% on Oslo Stock Exchange, rating it as the 21st largest of 49 security companies in Norway. The company was a subsidiary of Terra Markets that is owned by Norne Securities.

In 2007 the company was hit by the Terra Securities scandal that after having misinformed eight municipalities in Norway as to the risk of their investments. On 28 November 2007 the company filed for bankruptcy after the Financial Supervisory Authority of Norway had stripped Terra Securities of its brokerage license.
