= Svein Erik Nordang =

Norwegian businessperson and broker (born 1968)

Svein Erik Nordang (born 17 November 1968) is a Norwegian businessperson and broker.

He was the chief executive officer of Terra Securities until it filed for bankruptcy on 28 November 2007 due to loss of all concession from the Financial Supervisory Authority of Norway due to the Terra Securities scandal. He was hired in Terra Securities in 2001, and was promoted to CEO in 2006.

He lives in Oslo.
