= Nygårds Hydroelectric Power Station =

Nygårds Power Station
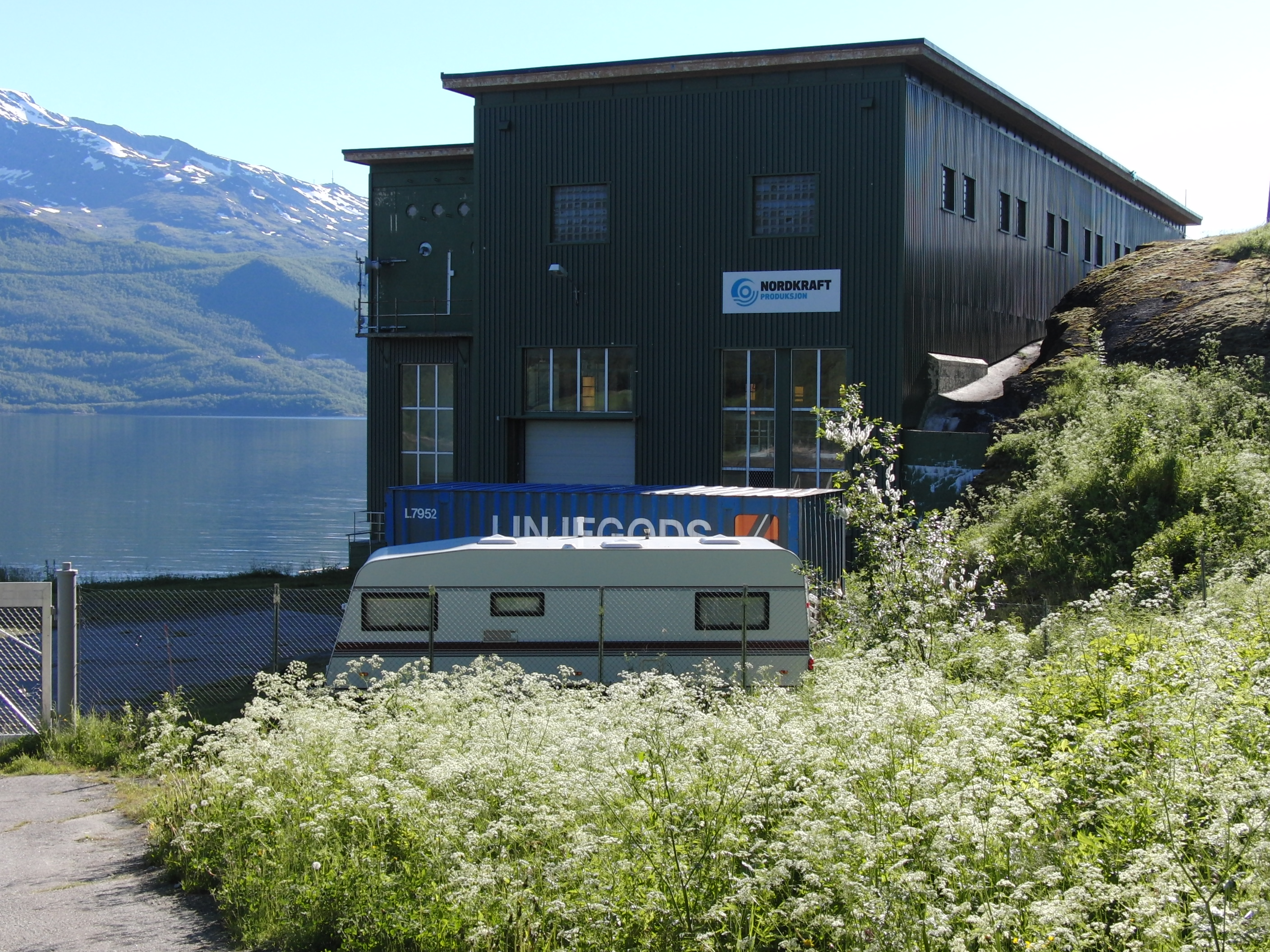
- Official name: Nygård kraftverk
- Country: Norway
- Location: Narvik Municipality
- Coordinates: 68°28′33″N 17°37′33″E
- Status: Operational
- Opening date: 1932; 93 years ago
- Owner(s): Nordkraft

Upper reservoir
- Creates: Trollvatn

Lower reservoir
- Creates: Rombaksfjorden (Norwegian Sea)

Power Station
- Hydraulic head: 250-259 m
- Turbines: 3
- Installed capacity: 25 MW
- Capacity factor: 50.3%
- Annual generation: 110 GW·h

Nygårds Power Station is a hydroelectric power plant in Storelva in Narvik Municipality. It has a power output of 25 megawatts (34,000 hp) generated by three vertical Francis turbines. Originally, it was used also for the generation of single phase AC for the railway, but today only three phase AC is produced.

== See also ==
- Nygårdsfjellet Wind Farm
- Rombaksfjorden
