= Ditlef =

Ditlef is a given name. Notable people with the name include:

- Ditlef Hvistendahl Christiansen (1865–1944), Norwegian Supreme Court Justice
- Ditlef Eckhoff (born 1942), Norwegian jazz musician

== See also ==
- Detlef
