= SpareBank 1 Nordmøre =

Norwegian savings bank

- Type: Savings bank
- Industry: Banking
- Founded: 1835
- Headquarters: Kristiansund, Norway
- Area served: Møre og Romsdal, Norway
- Revenue: ▲NOK 158 million (2005)
- Operating income: NOK 68 million (2005)
- Net income: NOK 48 million (2005)
- Number of employees: 163 (2026)
- Website: www.snv.no

SpareBank 1 Nordmøre is a Norwegian savings bank with branches in Nordmøre in addition to Molde and Ålesund. The bank has 11 branch offices with a head office in Kristiansund and has total assets of NOK 5 billion. The bank is part of the bank alliances SpareBank 1 and Samarbeidende Sparebanker.

There are branch offices located in Aure, Averøy, Gjemnes, Heim, Hustadvika, Kristiansund, Molde, Smøla, Tingvoll, and Ålesund.

== History ==
The bank can trace its roots back to 1835 when Kristiansunds Sparebank was created. During the 1960s Kristiansunds Sparebank merged with some other local savings banks. In 1973 the two banks in Kristiansund merged with each other in addition to Øre and Smølen and changed its name to Nordmøre Sparebank. In 2000 the bank took the brand name SpareBank 1 when it joined the SpareBank 1 alliance and changed its juridical name to SpareBank 1 Nordmøre. The bank also took over VÅR Bank's operations in Møre and Romsdal when it was bought by SpareBank 1.

=== List of banks that merged ===
- Bremnes Sparebank (1908)
- Frei Sparebank (1912)
- Halsa Spaebank (1909)
- Kristiansunds Sparebank (1835)
- Kristiansunds Spareskillingsbank (1861)
- Kvernes Sparebank (1894)
- Smølen Sparebank (1903)
- Straumsnes Sparebank (1920)
- Tustna Sparebank (1912)
- Valsøyfjord Sparebank (1895)
- Øre Sparebank (1910)
