= Kuvaas =

Kuvaas is a surname. Notable people with the surname include:

- Karen Margrethe Kuvaas (born 1947), Norwegian politician
- Torstein Olav Kuvaas (1908–1996), Norwegian politician
