= Sparebanken Norge =

Norwegian savings bank

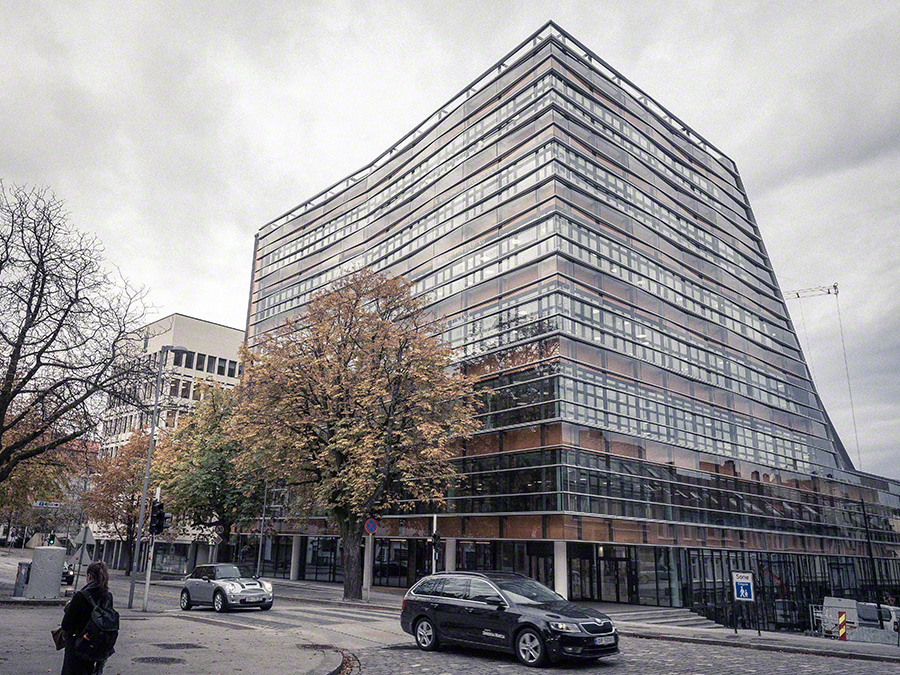
- Group headquarters in Bergen
- Type: Savings bank
- Industry: Banking
- Predecessors: Sparebanken Vest; Sparebanken Sør
- Founded: 2 May 2025
- Headquarters: Bergen, Norway
- Area served: Norway
- Number of employees: 1,321
- Website: www.sparebankennorge.no

Sparebanken Norge (OSE: SBNOR) is a Norwegian banking and financial services group. It was created on 2 May 2025 as a merger between Sparebanken Vest and Sparebanken Sør. The group's headquarters are jointly in Bergen and Kristiansand. As of October 2025, it was the largest savings bank in Norway with 69 branches. As of 2024, the two merging banks had 517 billion kroner in assets under management, making it the largest in this regard amongst savings banks in Norway.

As of June 2026, the CEO of Sparebanken Norge is Jan Erik Kjerpeseth.

== Merger and restructuring ==
Both Sparebanken Vest and Sparebanken Sør were regional savings banks in their time created through mergers of small, local savings banks. Sparebanken Vest had its base in Bergen, with operations through Møre og Romsdal, Vestland and Rogaland. Sparebanken Sør was based in Kristiansand and had its main operations in Agder. The oldest of the predecessors was Bergens Sparebank, which was established in 1823. Prior to the merger, Sparebanken Vest was the third-largest and Sparebanken Sør the fifth-largest savings banks in Norway. The merger negotiations were carried out through early 2024, and announced on 28 August. Equity holders of Sparebanken Vest received 64.3 percent of the new equity, while 35.7 percent went to the equity holders of Sparebanken Sør. At the time of the announcement, the banks had a combined 517 billion kroner in assets under management and gross loans of 429 billion. This made it the largest savings bank in Norway.

The bank is undergoing restructuring as part of the integration of the Sparebanken Vest and Sparebanken Sør. In October 2025, Sparebanken Norge announced that it was moving 60 employees from Arendal to the head office in Kristiansand. In December 2025, Sparebanken Norge said that many employees had accepted severance packages following the merger. In June 2026, the bank announced that it would further reduce staffing during the calendar year.
