= Samarbeidende Sparebanker =

Norwegian bank holding company

Samarbeidende Sparebanker AS is a Norwegian bank holding company that owns 19.50 percent of SpareBank 1 Gruppen. As of May 2025, the group is owned by the following Norwegian savings banks:

- SpareBank 1 Gudbrandsdal
- SpareBank 1 Hallingdal Valdres
- SpareBank 1 Helgeland
- SpareBank 1 Lom og Skjåk
- SpareBank 1 Nordmøre
- SpareBank 1 Ringerike Hadeland
- SpareBank 1 Sogn og Fjordane
- SpareBank 1 Østfold Akershus
