= Asgeir Almås =

Norwegian politician

Asgeir Kåre Almås
- Born: June 15, 1948 (age 77)
- Occupation: politician

Asgeir Kåre Almås (born June 15, 1948) is a Norwegian politician for the Norwegian Labour Party and mayor of Hattfjelldal Municipality.

In 2007 he was one of the eight mayors that led the municipalities in their accusations against Terra-Gruppen in the Terra Securities scandal, where Hattfjelldal risked losing 103 million kr.
