= Andrea Loberto =

Italian football manager

Personal information
- Date of birth: 7 November 1974 (age 51)
- Place of birth: Milan, Italy

Team information
- Current team: Saint-Étienne (assistant)

Managerial career
- Years: Team
- 2005–2013: Vålerenga (youth)
- 2014–2015: Rosenborg (youth)
- 2015–2016: Haugesund (assistant)
- 2016: → Haugesund (caretaker)
- 2017: Fredrikstad
- 2018–2020: Aalesund (assistant)
- 2021: Brann (assistant)
- 2022: Vålerenga (player developer)
- 2023–2024: Stabæk (assistant)
- 2025–: Saint-Étienne (assistant)

Andrea Loberto (born 7 November 1974) is an Italian football manager who is currently assistant manager of Saint-Étienne in France.

Moving to Norway to pursue a career there, he was youth coach in Vålerenga and Rosenborg before becoming assistant manager of Haugesund. He became manager on a caretaker basis in the summer of 2016, overseeing the second half of 2016 Eliteserien. In 2017 he managed Fredrikstad, before returning to the assistant manager role at Aalesund and Brann. After Brann was relegated, Loberto applied for the position as player developer at Vålerenga, and edged out 82 other applicants to get the job. Before the end of the year, he was signed by Stabæk as their new assistant manager ahead of the 2023 season. In this, Loberto reunited with his old manager from Aalesund, Lars Bohinen.
