= ODIN Fund Management =

ODIN Forvaltning
- Company type: Subsidiary
- Industry: Financial services
- Founded: 1990
- Headquarters: Oslo, Norway
- Products: Mutual funds
- Number of employees: 63 (2026)
- Parent: Sparebank 1
- Website: www.odinfundmanagement.com

ODIN Fund Management is one of the largest Norwegian mutual funds managers, established in 1990 under the name Independent Fund Management. The name was changed to ODIN Forvaltning in 1992. The equity funds ODIN Norge and ODIN Norden are among the top ten of Norwegian funds, both in terms of number of retail customers and assets under management, and both have been cited as previously delivering impressive returns by domestic media, alongside several of their smaller funds.

The company is one of the largest fund managers in Norway, which from 2012 to 2015 increased total assets from NOK 25 to 40 billion.
