= Nygårdsfjellet Wind Farm =

Wind farm in Narvik, Norway

Nygårdsfjellet
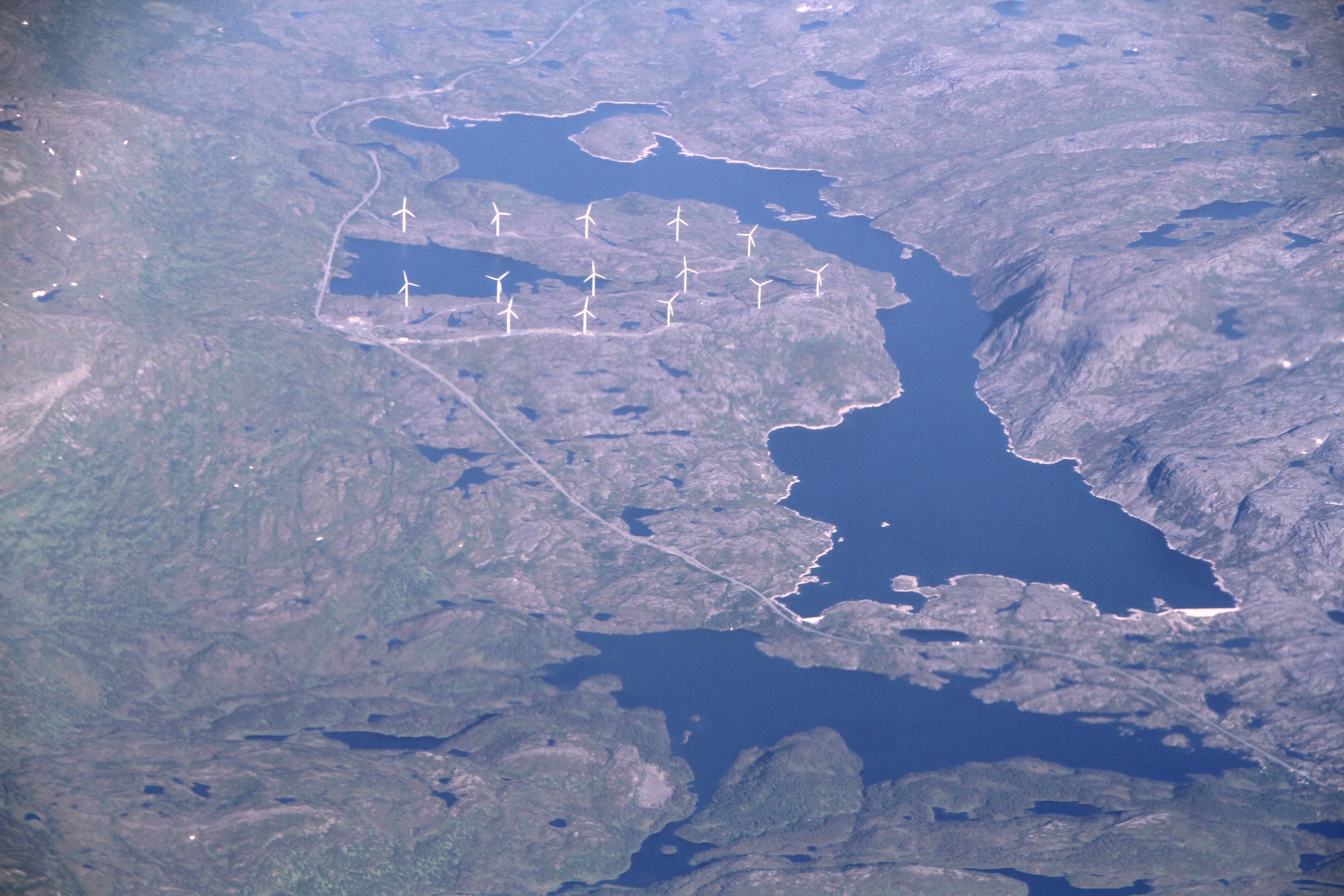
- The 14 wind turbines of Nygårdsfjellet Wind Farm
- Official name: Nygårdsfjellet vindpark
- Country: Norway
- Location: Narvik
- Coordinates: 68.506°N 17.8913°E
- Status: Operational
- Commission date: 2006
- Owners: Narvik Energi; DONG Energy

Wind farm
- Type: Onshore
- Hub height: 80 metres (260 ft)
- Rotor diameter: 90 metres (300 ft)
- Site elevation: 400 metres (1,300 ft)

Power generation
- Units operational: 14 x 2.3 MW
- Make and model: Siemens Gamesa SWT-2.3-93 (14)
- Nameplate capacity: 32.2 MW
- Capacity factor: 36.9%
- Annual net output: 104.2 GW·h

External links
- Commons: Related media on Commons

Nygårdsfjellet Wind Farm is a windfarm located in Narvik Municipality in Nordland county, Norway. The wind turbines are located at an elevation of 400 metres (1,300 ft) above sea level. The farm is owned by Nordkraft Vind, a joint venture between Narvik Energi and DONG Energy. It started production in 2006 with three 2.3 megawatts (3,100 hp) turbines, an annual production of 26 gigawatt-hours (94 TJ) and with plans to add more turbines.

In 2011 an additional 11 turbines of the same capacity were commissioned, bringing the total capacity to 32.2 megawatts (43,200 hp) and the annual production to 104.2 gigawatt-hours (375 TJ) corresponding to the average consumption of 5,200 Norwegian households.

== See also ==
- Nygårds Hydroelectric Power Station
