= SpareBank 1 =

Norwegian alliance of regional savings banks

SpareBank 1 Gruppen AS

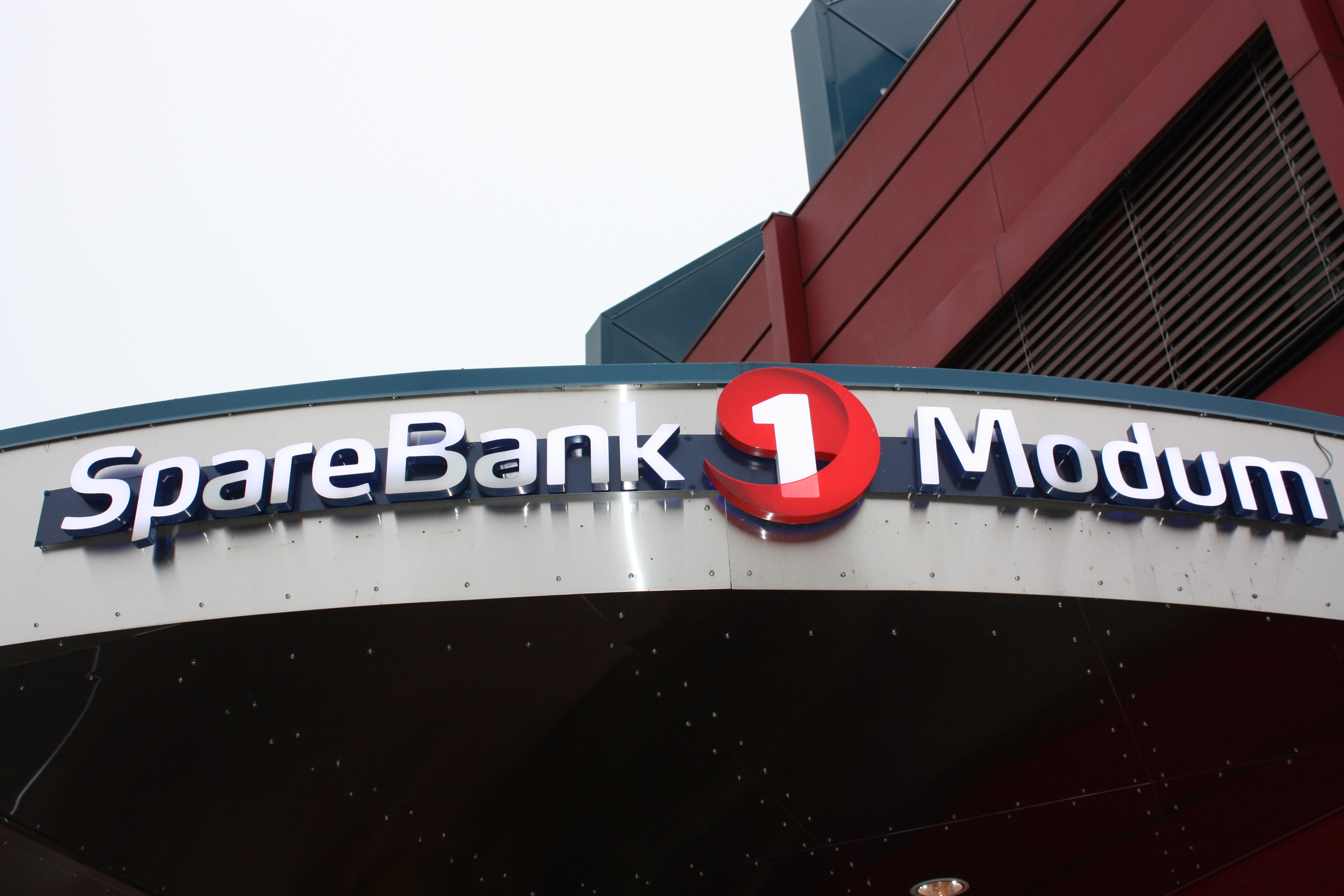
- SpareBank 1 Modum
- Company type: Private
- Industry: Banking, Insurance and Pension
- Founded: 1996
- Headquarters: Oslo, Norway
- Area served: Norway
- Key people: Turid Grotmoll (CEO)
- Owner: SpareBank 1 Sør-Norge ASA (19.5%); SpareBank 1 Nord-Norge (19.5%); SpareBank 1 SMN (19.5%); Samarbeidende Sparebanker AS (19.5%); SpareBank 1 Østlandet (12.4%); LO (9.6%)
- Number of employees: 6,300 (2010)
- Website: www.sparebank1.no

SpareBank 1 is a Norwegian alliance and brand name for a group of savings banks. The alliance is organised through the holding company SpareBank 1 Gruppen AS owned by the participating banks. In total the alliance is Norway's second largest bank with total assets of NOK 625 billion, 352 branches and 6300 employees. The alliance has its head office in Oslo, Norway. The banks in the SpareBank 1 Alliance distribute SpareBank 1 groups' products and collaborate in key areas such as brands, work processes, expertise development, IT operations and system development.

Companies in the group include the mutual fund company ODIN Forvaltning, the life insurance company SpareBank 1 Livsforsikring, the insurance company SpareBank 1 Skadeforsikring, the credit card company SpareBank 1 Medlemskort, SpareBank 1 Utvikling, the commercial bank Bank 1 Oslo, the car finance company SpareBank 1 Bilplan (19.9%) and the securities company First Securities (24.5%).

== History ==
In 1996 the original members of the alliance, Sparebanken SMN, Sparebanken Nord-Norge, Sparebanken Rogaland and Sparebanken Vest founded the alliance, at first (but never branded) as Sparebankgruppen. The same year the company bought the life insurance company DAVID Livsforsikring, now SpareBank 1 Livsforsikring, in addition to part of the mutual fund company ODIN Forvaltning, now wholly owned by SpareBank 1. In 1997 the alliance of small savings banks Samarbeidende Sparebanker.

In 1998 the Swedish bank FöreningsSparbanken (now Swedbank) purchased 24% of the company. The same year Sparebank 1 established a credit card company followed in 1999 with the establishment of the real estate agent EiendomsMegler 1. The company also buys part of First Securities.

The same year SpareBank 1 purchased VÅR Bank from the labour union Landsorganisasjonen (LO). This bank was renamed Bank 1 Oslo, with branches in Oslo and Akershus while other branches of the bank were taken over by other alliance members. LO acquired at the same time 10% of the stocks in SpareBank 1.

In 2003 the first major member of the alliance leaves when Sparebanken Vest sells its shares. In 2006 Sparebanken Hedmark entered the group, while FöreningsSparbanken sold its shares.

== Member banks ==
SpareBank 1 Gruppen is owned by the participating banks. SpareBank 1 Sør-Norge ASA (19.5%), SpareBank 1 Nord-Norge (19.5%), SpareBank 1 SMN (19.5%), SpareBank 1 Østlandet (12.4%) all own part of the company directly while the remaining banks own through Samarbeidende Sparebanker AS (19.5%). The labor union LO (9.6%) also has an ownership in the company.

As of May 2025, Samarbeidende Sparebanker consists of:

- SpareBank 1 Gudbrandsdal
- SpareBank 1 Hallingdal Valdres
- SpareBank 1 Helgeland
- SpareBank 1 Lom og Skjåk
- SpareBank 1 Nordmøre
- SpareBank 1 Ringerike Hadeland
- SpareBank 1 Sogn og Fjordane
- SpareBank 1 Østfold Akershus

Other associates:

- BN Bank ASA
- Kredittbanken ASA

== Sponsorships ==
Sparebank 1 sponsors the Norwegian Tippeligaen football team Viking F.K. The Sparebank 1 logo can be found on the back across the top of the shirt.
