= Ditlef Hvistendahl Christiansen =

Ditlef Hvistendahl Christiansen (29 March 1865 – 1 July 1944) was a Norwegian Supreme Court Justice.

He was born in Tønsberg as a son of Mathilde Georgine Hvistendahl (1834–1911) and ship-owner Johan Henrik Christiansen (1823–1904). He was a brother of barrister Johan Henrik Christiansen. In 1898 he married physician's daughter Antonette Zimmer. Their son Hans Zimmer Christiansen became district manager in the Norwegian State Railways.

He finished his secondary education in 1883, and graduated from the Royal Frederick University in 1888 with a cand.jur. degree. He was hired as a civil servant in the Ministry of Labour in 1894 and moved to the Ministry of Justice in 1898. He was an Assessor in Oslo City Court from 1900, and then a Supreme Court Justice from 1911 to 1936. From 1927 he was also a member of the Labour Court of Norway.

He was a board member of the Norwegian Association of Judges, a supervisory council member of the insurance company Glitne, and from 1919 to 1929 a deputy member of the Norwegian Insurance Council. He died in July 1944.
