= SpareBank 1 SMN =

Norwegian savings bank

Coordinates: 63°25′54″N 10°23′59″E

- Type: Savings bank
- Traded as: (OSE: MING)
- Industry: Banking
- Founded: 1823
- Headquarters: Trondheim, Norway
- Area served: Norway
- Key people: Finn Haugan (CEO)
- Number of employees: 711 (2005)
- Website: www.smn.no

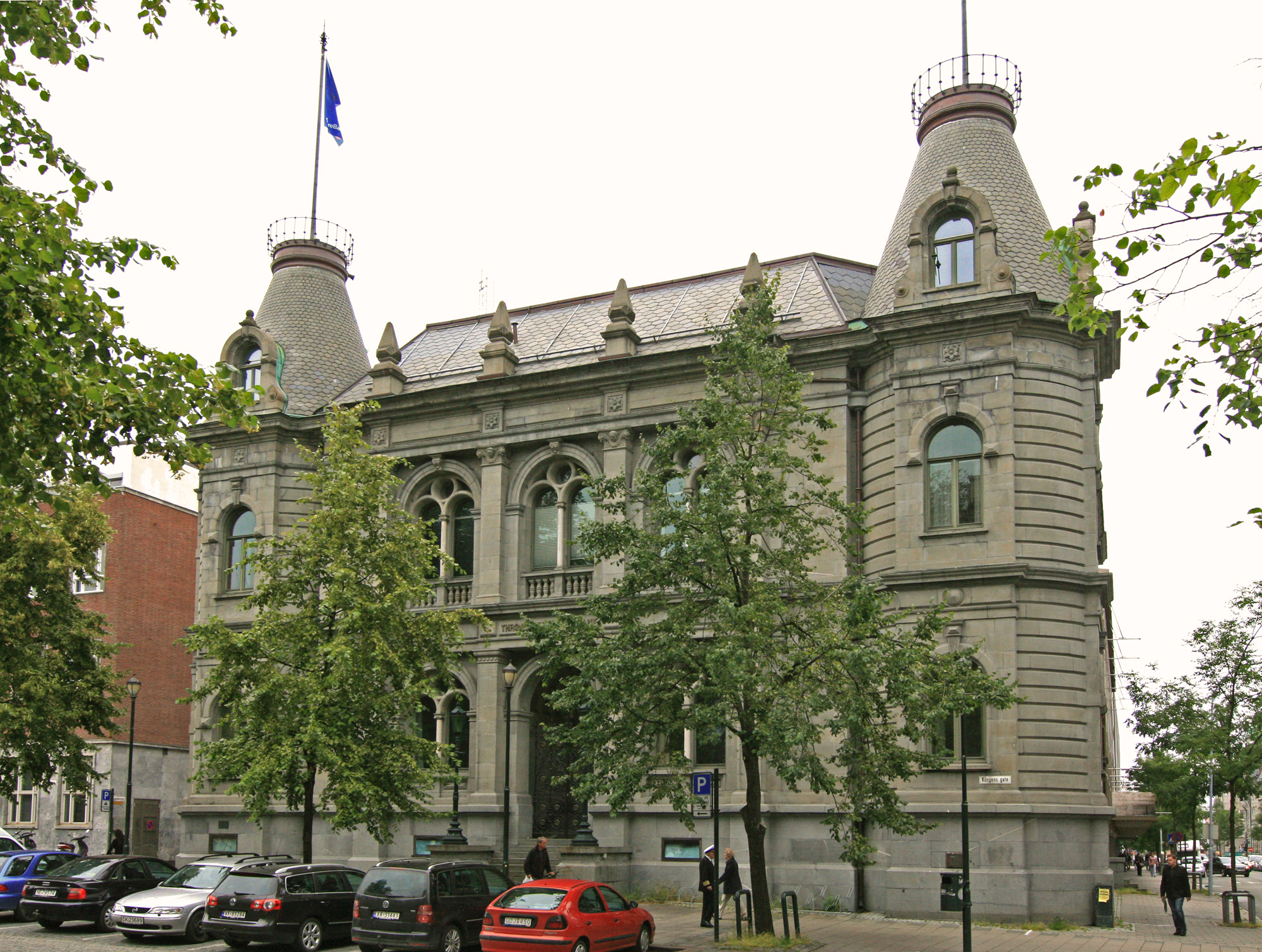
Head office of Sparebanken Midt-Norge in downtown Trondheim

SpareBank 1 SMN is a Norwegian savings bank based in Trøndelag.

The bank has 71 branches in 51 municipalities in Central Norway and is part of the bank alliance SpareBank 1. In Nord-Trøndelag and Sør-Trøndelag the bank is branded SpareBank 1 Midt-Norge while it is branded SpareBank 1 Romsdals Fellesbank in Møre og Romsdal but in April 2008 the bank changed its name to Sparebank 1 SMN. The company has its head office in Trondheim. The CEO is Finn Haugan.

The bank has total assets of NOK 46 billion, making it the 9th largest bank in Norway. In Trøndelag the bank has a market share of 38% while it has a 28% marked share in Romsdal. The bank serves both private customers in addition to agricultural, small and medium-sized businesses in addition to the public sector.

== History ==
The bank has roots to Trondhjems Sparebank which was founded to 1823. Sparebanken Midt-Norge was created in 1984 when 23 savings banks in Trøndelag merged to create a regional savings bank. In 1988 Spareskillingsbanken was also merged into the bank. The bank created grunnfondsbevis in 1994 and listed itself on Oslo Stock Exchange. In 1996 it was one of the founding banks of the alliance SpareBank 1, where it today holds a 19.5% ownership. In 2005 it bought the commercial bank Romsdals Fellesbank.

== Awards ==
In collaboration with the Royal Norwegian Society of Sciences and Letters, the bank awards the biannual Gunnerus Sustainability Award.
