= Terra Markets =

Investment bank

Terra Markets AS
- Formerly: Orion Securities AS (1999–2009)
- Company type: Private
- Industry: Financial services
- Founded: 1999; 27 years ago as Orion Securities AS in Oslo, Norway
- Defunct: 12 December 2013
- Headquarters: Oslo, Norway
- Area served: Norway
- Key people: Lise Vedde (CEO); Audun Bø (Chairman)
- Number of employees: 75 (2011)
- Parent: Eika Gruppen (2009–2012); Norne Securities (2012–present)
- Subsidiaries: Terra Securities (1997–2007)

Terra Markets AS (formerly known as Orion Securities AS) is a Norwegian investment banking firm in the Norne Securities group. Terra Markets employs 75 professionals in brokerage, equity research, market making and corporate finance. The equity research team consists of 15 analysts who cover approximately 150 listed companies in Norway. The team has a particularly strong coverage of small and midcap companies on the Oslo Stock Exchange and is in the Norwegian market. Terra Markets is a member of the stock exchanges in Oslo.

== History ==
- In 2009, Terra Group acquired the investment firm Orion Securities AS, and later changed its name to Terra Markets AS.
- In 2012, Terra Markets was acquired by Norne Securities AS
