= BN Bank =

Commercial bank in Norway

BN Bank ASA
- Company type: Subsidiary
- Industry: Financial services
- Founded: 1961; 65 years ago
- Headquarters: Trondheim, Norway
- Area served: Norway
- Key people: Finn Haugan
- Revenue: 1,503,000,000 Norwegian krone (2024)
- Net income: NOK 238 million (2006)
- Number of employees: 107 (2007)
- Parent: SpareBank 1 Gruppen AS
- Website: www.bnbank.no

BN Bank ASA, formerly known as Bolig- og Næringsbanken, is a Norwegian commercial bank based in Trondheim with a branch office in Oslo. Owned by the SpareBank 1-alliance, the bank has 50,000 customers and total assets of NOK 48 billion. The bank has specialized in mortgages, private financing and account saving, and does not offer advanced investment products. The bank was listed on the Oslo Stock Exchange between 1989 and 2005 when it was acquired by Glitnir.
