= Eika Gruppen =

Alliance of Norwegian savings banks

Eika Gruppen AS
- Type: Private
- Industry: Financial services
- Founded: 1997; 29 years ago
- Headquarters: Oslo, Norway
- Area served: Norway
- Key people: Hege Beate Toft Karlsen (CEO); Øivind Larsen (Chairman)
- Products: Securities, Insurance, Real estate agencies, Financing, Debit cards and Credit cards

Eika Gruppen, formerly Terra-Gruppen, branded as Terra is a strategic alliance among 77 local Norwegian savings banks that co-ordinates work within the areas defined as falling within the alliance. The group supplies products and services to banks and other actors within the financial sector. The services of Eika include product development, procurement of services and products relating to information technology and payment processing, project management, training and expertise development. The financial companies provides a wide range of financial products, including securities, insurance and real estate agencies, financing and debit cards and credit cards. The alliance has its headquarters in Oslo, Norway, and the owner banks have total assets of NOK 250 billion.

== Subsidiaries ==
- Aktiv Eiendomsmegling (real estate agencies incl franchise)
- Aktiv Eiendomsoppgjør (real estate services)
- Eika BoligKreditt (mortgage finance)
- Eika Kredittbank (credit and debit cards, consumer finance)
- Eika Kapitalforvaltning (funds manager)
- Eika Forsikring (insurance)

== History ==
The alliance was founded in 1997 as Eika Gruppen as a consequence of the new trends in Norwegian banking. Previously there had been a massive merging among Norwegian savings banks, resulting in a number of regional savings banks, the largest of these being Sparebanken NOR that was a merger between a total of more than one hundred banks. In 1996 a lot of the other large, regional banks formed an alliance called SpareBank 1 to provide an umbrella for their operations. At the same time both the large savings banks and the commercial banks had two new trends; a new technological platform with online banking and the banks providing the total range of financial services, also including savings, securities and insurance. Also the small, independent savings banks who had not merged needed to provide these services. As a result they formed Eika Gruppen. Since 1997, the group has acquired subsidiaries to perform a larger and larger sprectre of products. The alliance changed its name to Terra-Gruppen in 2000.

In 2007, Terra-Gruppen received a major blow in the Terra Securities scandal where former Terra Securities had sold very questionable, complex and geared investments to eight municipalities. On November 28, 2007, Terra Securities lost all concessions from the Financial Supervisory Authority of Norway and filed for bankruptcy the same day. As a consequence, CEO Ola Sundt Ravnestad retired as CEO, following board member Sverre Leiro who had retired a week earlier. New CEO was Stein Ole Larsen.

Konsernsjef (Stein Ole Larsen) and visekonsernsjef (Lise Vedde-Fjærestad) resigned in 2012, on the same day that media reported about Finanstilsynet's criticism of the company.

In 2012 the board resolved to return to the original Eika name and this was implemented from 21 March 2013.
