= Sverre Leiro =

Norwegian businessperson (born 1947)

Sverre Leiro (born 26 April 1947) is a Norwegian businessperson

He was the chief executive officer in NorgesGruppen until 2011, when he stepped down. He instead became chair of the Federation of Norwegian Enterprises and chair of Moelven Industrier. From 2006 to 2007 he was a board member of Terra-Gruppen, but withdrew on 23 November 2007 due to the Terra Securities scandal.
