= Norwegian Insurance Council =

Government agency of Norway

Norwegian Insurance Council (Norwegian: Forsikringsrådet) was a supervisory authority for the insurance industry in Norway.

It was created following the Insurance Companies Act of 29 July 1911, replacing a committee named Komiteen til å føre tilsyn med private forsørgelses- og understøttelsesselskaper. From 1958 it also supervised pension funds.

In 1986 it was merged with the Bank Inspection Agency and the Broker Control Agency to form the Financial Supervisory Authority of Norway.
