= Narvik Energi =

Norwegian power company

Narvik Energi AS
- Type: Private
- Industry: Power
- Founded: 21 December 1913
- Founder: City of Narvik
- Headquarters: Narvik, Norway
- Key people: Olaf Andreas Larsen (CEO); Sigve Nils Stokland (Chairman)
- Products: Electricity
- Revenue: ▲NOK 413 million (2006)
- Operating income: NOK 210 million (2006)
- Net income: NOK 135 million (2006)
- Owner: City of Narvik (50.01%); DONG Energy (33.33%); HelgelandsKraft (16.66%)
- Number of employees: 100 (2007)
- Website: www.narvik-energi.no

Narvik Energi is a power company that serves Narvik in Norway. It operates seven hydroelectric power stations and Nygårdsfjellet wind farm. The company is owned by the City of Narvik (50.01%), DONG Energy (33.33%) and HelgelandsKraft (16.66%). Total annual average production is 950 GWh.

== Operations ==
The company operates the power stations of Nygård, Håkvikelva, Sildvik, Sørfjord I, Sørfjord II, Sirkevann and Taraldsvik. The power grid is through the Narvik Energinett, that is owned 49% by HelgelandsKraft.

The company owns its windfarms through the 50% owned companies Nordkraft Vind (that operates Nygårdsfjellet), Vesterålskraft Vind and Lofotkraft Vind.

== History ==
On 21 December 1913 the Narvik Kommunale Elektrisitetsverk was established by the municipality. The same year the first power station, Høybakkfoss, was opened and street lighting was established in Narvik, while Silvannfos was built two years later. The company also established an electrical article store and installation division, but these were closed in 1995 and 1990, respectively. In 1922 Mølnfoss was opened, and in 1923 the Norwegian State Railways announced that Ofotbanen was to be electrified, and NKE built Nygårdsvassdraget to cover the need, opening in 1932. In 1949 Håkvikvassdraget was rebuilt with one new power station.

In 1995 the company, that had been a municipal agency, was transformed to a limited company with the municipality as sole owner. From 1998 to 2001 Narvik Energi increased its ownership in Nordkraft from 17% to 100%, but at the same time HelgelandsKraft and Vesterålskraft bought part of Narvik Energi. In 2002 the Danish state enterprise Energi E2 (now DONG) bought a third of the company, through buying out Vesterålskraft, part of HelgelandsKrafts ownership and through an issue. In 2003 the power grid was demerged into a Narvik Energinett and 49% sold to HelgelandsKraft. In 2005 the wind farm at Nygårdsfjellet was opened. In 2006 all the electrical production was concentrated in the wholly owned subsidiary Nordkraft.
