= Petter Steen Jr. =

Norwegian politician (born 1962)

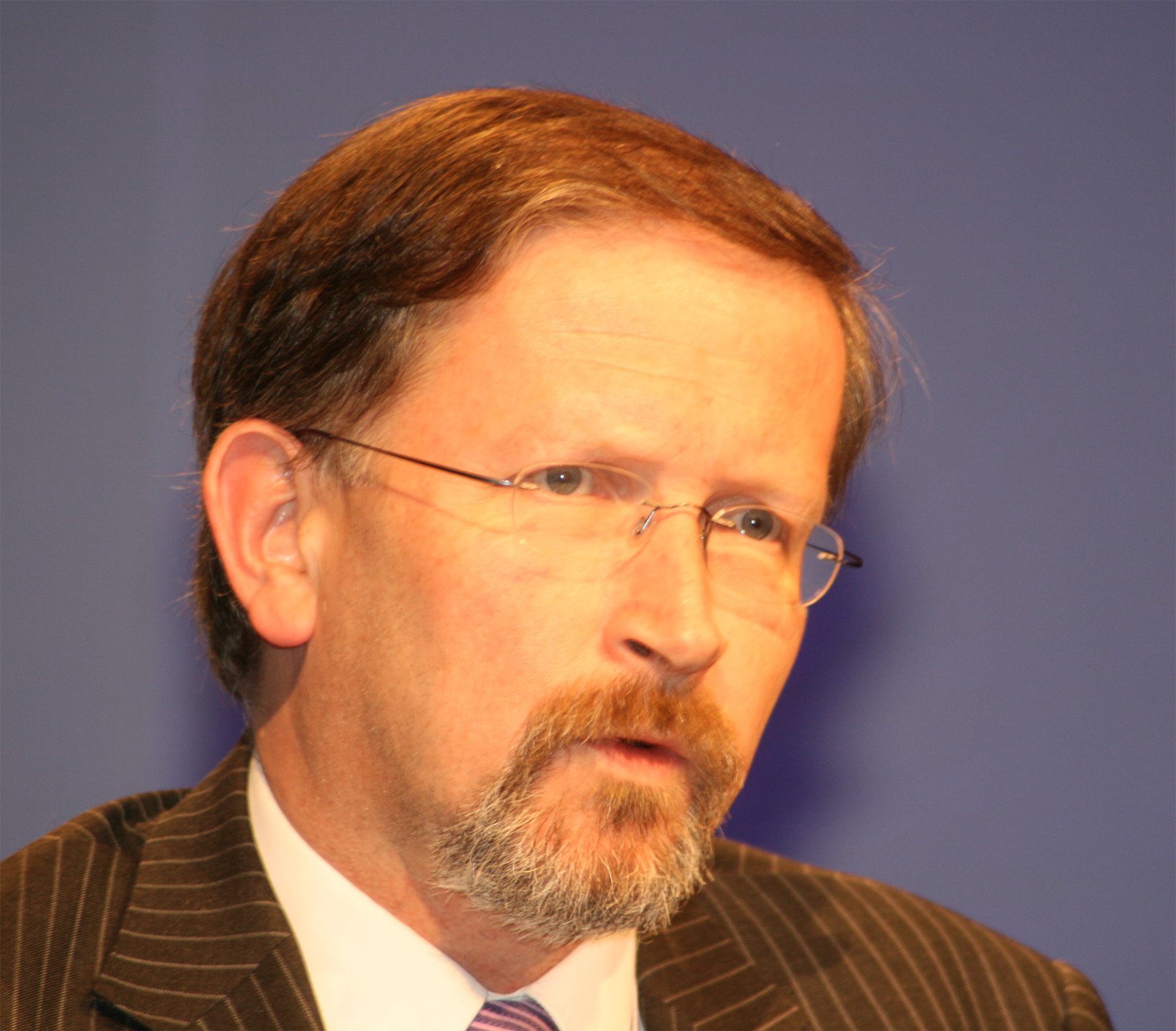
- Steen in 2009

Mayor of Haugesund Municipality
- In office 2001–2015
- Preceded by: Finn Martin Vallersnes
- Succeeded by: Arne-Christian Mohn

Personal details
- Born: 1 August 1962 (age 64)
- Party: Conservative
- Education: Stavanger Teacher College
- Occupation: Politician

Petter Steen Jr. (born 1 August 1962) is a Norwegian politician for the Conservative Party who served as the mayor of Haugesund Municipality from 2001 to 2015.

Steen was educated at Stavanger Teacher College (1986), after which he worked in the public schools in Sveio Municipality until he was elected mayor in 2001.
