= Sparebanken Sør =

Defunct Norwegian savings bank

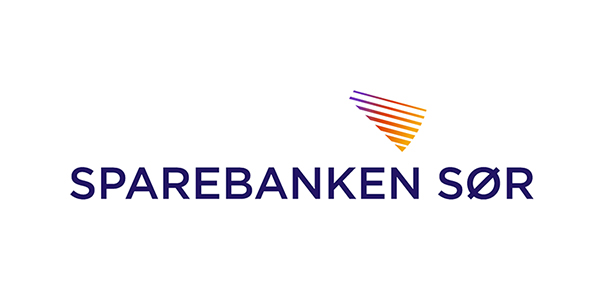
- Type: Savings bank
- Industry: Financial services
- Founded: 1984; 42 years ago
- Defunct: 1 May 2025; 14 months ago
- Successors: Sparebanken Norge
- Headquarters: Kristiansand, Norway
- Area served: Agder; Telemark
- Subsidiaries: Sør Boligkreditt AS; Sørmegleren (90%)
- Website: www.sor.no

Sparebanken Sør was a Norwegian banking and financial services group based in Kristiansand, Norway. The savings bank main market was located in the counties of Agder, Telemark and Rogaland.

There were 31 branches in this district serving the customers. The internet and mobile banking services are among the most modern in Norway. Sparebanken Sør was an independent savings bank with total assets of BNOK 90, and 500 man-years as of 1 January 2014.

The bank's main products were savings, loans and domestic and international payment services. In cooperation with other savings banks, Sparebanken Sør owned companies for insurance, securities and leasing/factoring, and the bank sold their products.

Sparebanken Sør was regulated by the Financial Supervisory Authority of Norway (Finanstilsynet).

== History ==
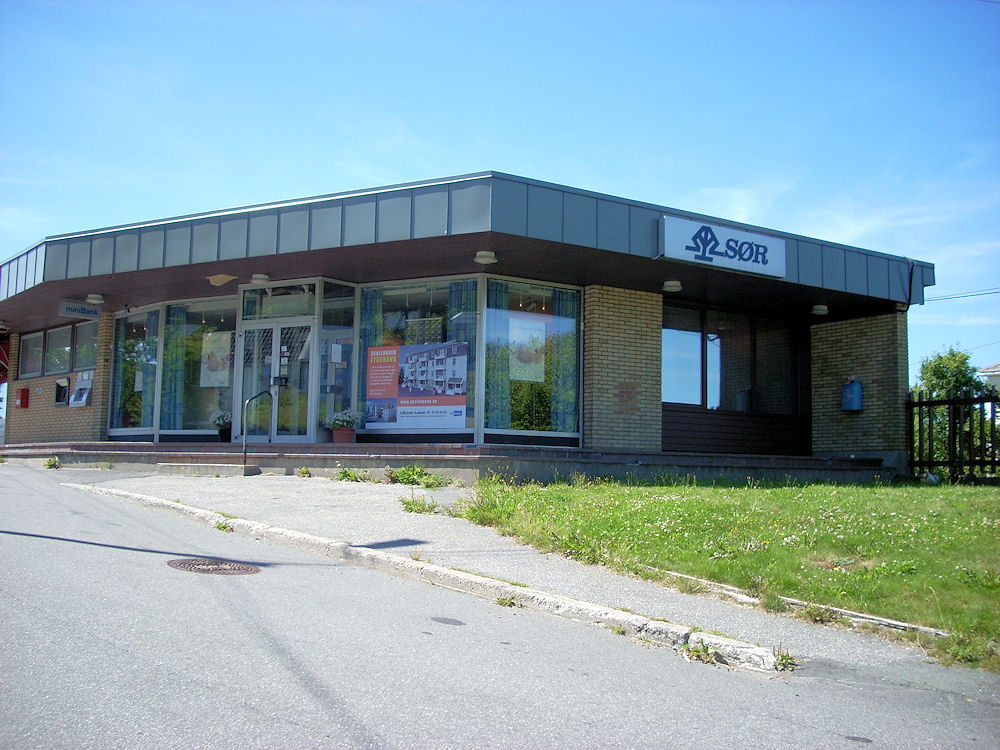
Former branch office at Eydehavn in Arendal Municipality

Sparebanken Sør’s history goes back to the year 1824 and 1825, when Christianssands Sparebank and Arendals Sparebank – two of the first banks in Norway – were established, respectively. In 1973, the bank merged with four other savings banks in the county of Aust-Agder and formed Aust-Agder Sparebank.

Sparebanken Sør was established in 1984, after a merger between Aust-Agder Sparebank, two other savings banks in Aust-Agder and nine in Vest-Agder. Since then, the bank has merged with savings banks in Telemark and opened branches in Grenland.

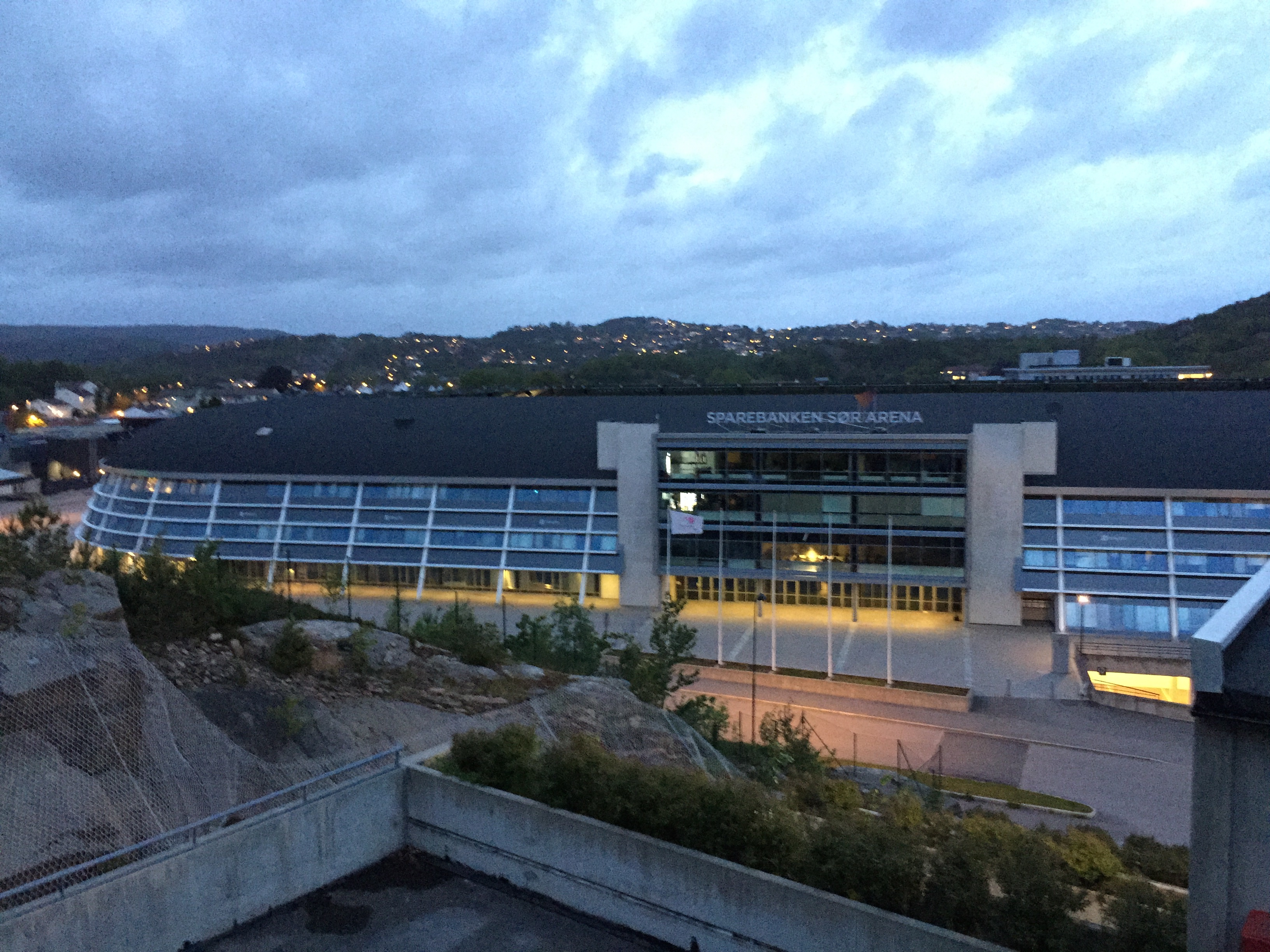
Sør Arena has a sponsorship agreement for its name withe the bank

From 2007 to 2009, the bank lost 230 million kroner on investments and loans to IK Start, a Kristiansand-based football club, its operating company Start Toppfotball and the stadium Sør Arena. The bank spent 50 million kroner on sponsorship, including purchasing the stadium name, bought shares in the company and lent money to build the stadium. In 2008, the bank as creditor was forced to take over the stadium, and subsequently also the club. In April 2011, CEO Morten Kraft was forced to resign after the incident. The Financial Supervisory Authority of Norway has criticized the bank for mixing its roles as creditor and investor, and for poor risk management.

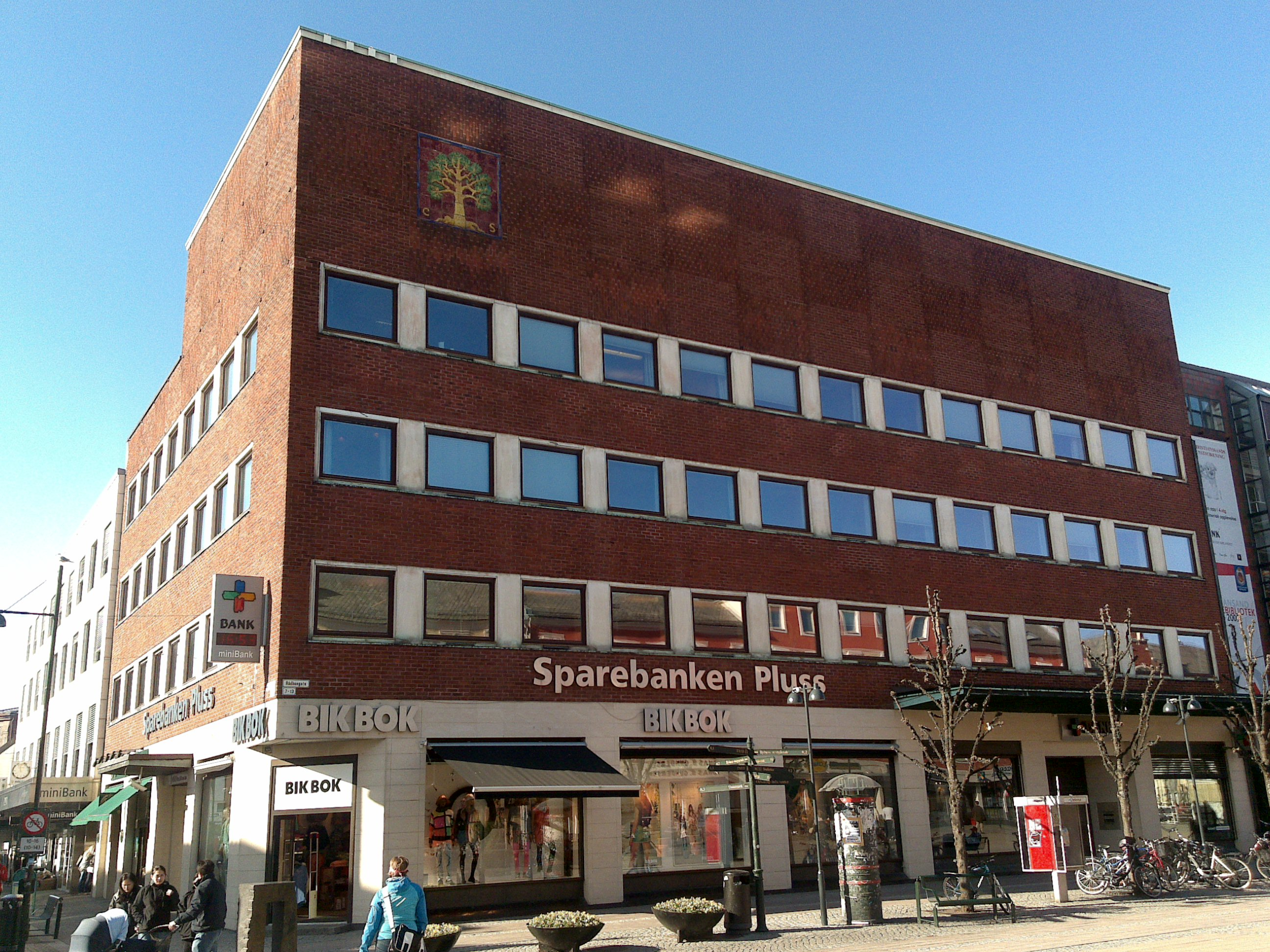
Head offices in Kristiansand, while it was still the offices of Sparebanken Pluss

Sparebanken Pluss, the company's main local competitor, based in Kristiansand, was taken over on 1 January 2014. After the merger, there was an increase in costs for customers, and the Norwegian Consumer Council warned customers about the lack of local competition following the merger.

Sparebanken Sør merged with Sparebanken Vest on 2 May 2025 to form Sparebanken Norge. Owners of Sparebanken Sør's equity received 35.7 percent of the new equity. At the time, Sparebanken Sør was the fifth-largest savings bank in Norway. Sparebanken Norge became the largest.
