= Bergens Sparebank =

Former Norwegian bank

Bergens Sparebank was a Norwegian savings bank based in Bergen. It was established in 1823, making it the second-oldest savings bank in Norway and the oldest in Bergen. It merged with 25 savings banks in 1982 to become Sparebanken Vest.
