= Karen Margrethe Kuvaas =

Norwegian politician

Karen Margrethe Kuvaas (born June 14, 1947) is a Norwegian politician for the Norwegian Labour Party and since 2007 mayor of Narvik Municipality.

Kuvaas took over as mayor succeeding her party colleague Olav Sigurd Alstad following the 2007 election. In November she was one of the four Nordland mayors who fronted the municipalities case in the Terra Securities scandal.
