= Ola Sundt Ravnestad =

Norwegian banker

Ola Sundt Ravnestad (born May 31, 1961 in Gloppen Municipality, Norway) is a Norwegian businessperson, banker and entrepreneur. He was the chief executive officer of the bank alliance Terra-Gruppen, that he founded along with a number of savings banks in the year 1997.

Sundt Ravnestad is an educated marine engineer, and siviløkonom (lit. 'civil economist'), from BI Norwegian Business School.
