= HelgelandsKraft =

Norwegian energy company

AS Helgelandskraft
- Company type: Municipal owned
- Industry: Power
- Founded: 1964
- Headquarters: Mosjøen, Norway
- Area served: Helgeland
- Key people: Ove Arnstein Brattbakk (CEO); Nils Magnar Johnsen (Chair)
- Products: Hydroelectricity; District heating
- Revenue: ▲NOK 1,074 million (2006)
- Operating income: NOK 263 million (2006)
- Net income: NOK 151 million (2006)
- Number of employees: 237 (2006)
- Parent: 14 municipalities
- Website: www.helgelandkraft.no

HelgelandsKraft is a power company that serves Helgeland in Norway. It owns eight hydro electric power plants with average annual production of 678 GWh as well as the power grid in the fourteen municipalities of Helgeland, that also own the company. It also operates district heating in Mo i Rana and a private equity company.

The company is owned by the municipalities of Alstahaug (10.1%), Brønnøy (9.6%), Dønna (4.4%), Grane (2.5%), Hattfjelldal (2.5%), Hemnes (7%), Herøy (3.8%), Leirfjord (3.2%), Nesna (4.6%), Rana (26.8%), Sømna (3.2%), Vefsn (18.3%), Vega (2.8%) and Vevelstad (1.2%).

== History ==
The companies roots date back to 1895 when Båsmo Gruber installed the district's first electric generator. In 1907 the first hydroelectric power plant was built in Helgeland, at Revelfossen in Tverråga. Through a number of mergers between the various municipal power companies AL Helgeland Kraftlag was created in 1964. Because of new regulations in the 1990s it was transformed to a limited company.

== Power plants ==
- Sjona Power Plant, 224 GWh (810 TJ)
- Grytåga Power Plant, 240 GWh (860 TJ)
- Fagervollan Power Plant, 56 GWh (200 TJ)
- Kaldåga Power Plant, 62 GWh (220 TJ)
- Forsland Power Plant, 28 GWh (100 TJ)
- Langfjord Power Plant, 33 GWh (120 TJ)
- Ildgrubfossen Power Plant, 28 GWh (100 TJ)
- Andåsfossen Power Plant, 6.5 GWh (23 TJ)
