= Sparebanken Vest =

Norwegian savings bank

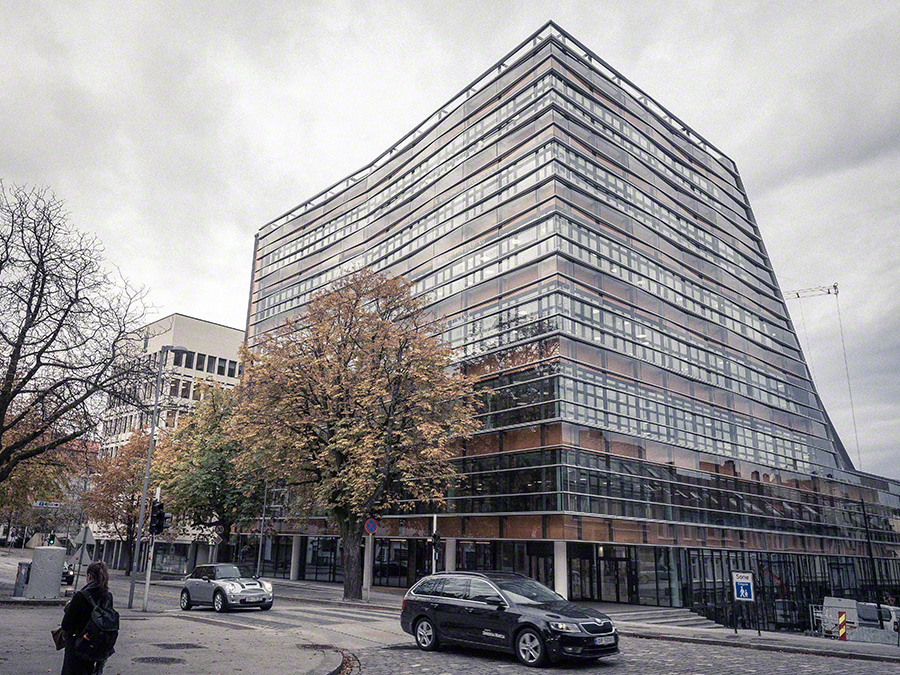
- The headquarters of Sparebanken Norge in Bergen
- Type: Savings bank
- Industry: Banking
- Founded: 1982; 44 years ago
- Defunct: 2 May 2025; 14 months ago
- Fate: Merger
- Successor: Sparebanken Norge
- Headquarters: Bergen, Norway
- Area served: Western Norway
- Revenue: NOK 55,7 billion
- Net income: 2,064,000,000 Norwegian krone (2019)
- Total assets: 197,166,000,000 Norwegian krone (2019)
- Number of employees: 732
- Website: www.spv.no

Sparebanken Vest was a savings bank based in Bergen, Norway, serving Western Norway. It was the third-largest savings bank in Norway. Sparebanken Vest had branches throughout Møre og Romsdal, Vestland and Rogaland.

The bank was formed in 1982 through the 25 savings banks in Hordaland. The oldest and largest of these was Bergens Sparebank, which dated back to 1823. Bergens Sparebank began merging with surrounding savings banks in 1964. The equity of the bank was listed on the Oslo Stock Exchange in 1995. It was part of the original group of banks which created SpareBank 1 in 1996. For a while the bank was therefore branded as SpareBank 1 Vest. It left the alliance in 2003, selling its shares in it in 2005. Sparebanken grew through the purchase of Vår Bank og Forsikring in 2000 and Fokus Bank's operations in Sogn og Fjordane in 2007. It merged with Sparebanken Sør on 2 May 2025 to form Sparebanken Norge.
