= SpareBank 1 Helgeland =

Norwegian savings bank

Helgeland Sparebank
- Type: Savings bank
- Traded as: OSE: HELG
- Industry: Financial services
- Founded: 1977
- Headquarters: Mosjøen, Norway
- Area served: Northern Norway
- Number of employees: 162 (2019)
- Website: www.hsb.no

Helgeland Sparebank is a Norwegian savings bank, headquartered in Mosjøen, Norway. The banks main market is the Helgeland district of northern Norway. The bank was established in 1977 with the merger of Vefsn Sparebank, Herøy Sparebank, Brønnøysund Sparebank, Velfjord Sparebank and Vevelstad Sparebank.
