= Business alliance =

Agreement between many buisnesses

A business alliance is an agreement between businesses, usually motivated by cost reduction and improved service for the customer. Alliances are often bounded by a single agreement with equitable risk and opportunity share for all parties involved and are typically managed by an integrated project team. An example of this is code sharing in airline alliances.

== Types ==
There are five basic categories or types of alliances:

- Sales: A sales alliance occurs when two companies agree to go to market together to sell complementary products and services.
- Solution-specific: A solution-specific alliance occurs when two companies agree to jointly develop and sell a specific marketplace solution.
- Geographic-specific: A geographic-specific alliance is developed when two companies agree to jointly market or co-brand their products and services in a specific geographic region.
- Investment: An investment alliance occurs when two companies agree to join their funds for mutual investment.
- Joint venture: A joint venture is an alliance that occurs when two or more companies agree to undertake economic activity together.

In many cases, alliances between companies can involve two or more categories or types of alliances.

== Horizontal alliances ==
A type of an alliance is a horizontal alliance. For example, a horizontal alliance can occur between logistics service providers, i.e., the cooperation between two or more logistics companies that are potentially competing. In a horizontal alliance, these partners can benefit twofold. On one hand, they can "access tangible resources which are directly exploitable." In this example extending common transportation networks, their warehouse infrastructure and the ability to provide more complex service packages can be achieved by combining resources. On the other hand, partners can "access intangible resources, which are not directly exploitable." This typically includes know-how and information and, in turn, innovation.

== Governance ==
Any alliance is susceptible to failures due to not achieving either cooperation or coordination, or both. Such inefficiencies originate from two well-known limitations in human nature, that are opportunism and bounded rationality. To enhance the success rate of alliances calls for proper levels of governance efforts. Contracts and relational norms are the two most commonly used governance mechanisms by business actors. They can also impact how business actors handle conflicts during the course of the focal collaboration as well as extend the current alliance to future collaborative relationships. Contractual and relational governance mechanisms have complex interactions, with one influencing the other's use and effectiveness in their different dimensions.

== See also ==
- Business group
- Competition regulator
- Strategic alliance
