= Financial Supervisory Authority of Norway =

- Finanstilsynet

Agency overview
- Formed: 1986
- Type: Government agency
- Jurisdiction: Norway
- Headquarters: Oslo, Norway
- Agency executive: Morten Baltzersen, Director
- Parent agency: Norwegian Ministry of Finance
- Website: http://www.finanstilsynet.no

The Financial Supervisory Authority of Norway (Norwegian: Finanstilsynet) is a Norwegian government agency responsible for supervision of financial companies within Norway based on law and regulations from Storting, the Norwegian Ministry of Finance and international accounting standards. The agency is located in Oslo and is under the supervision of the Ministry of Finance.

== History ==
It was established in 1986 through a merger of the Bank Inspection Agency, the Broker Control Agency and the Norwegian Insurance Council.

Primary companies supervised by the authority are banks, insurance companies, credit companies, financing companies, pension funds, security companies, stock exchanges, security registries, real estate agencies, debt collection agencies, accountants and auditors.

It was formerly named Kredittilsynet (lit. the Credit Supervisory Authority), but changed its name to Finanstilsynet in December 2009.

== See also ==
- Securities Commission
- List of financial supervisory authorities by country
