= 2025 KFUM-Kameratene Oslo season =

KFUM Oslo
2025 season
- Chairman: Christian Harlem
- Head coach: Johannes Moesgaard
- Stadium: KFUM Arena
- Eliteserien: 12th
- 2025 Norwegian Cup: Quarter-finals
- 2025–26 Norwegian Cup: Advanced to Fourth round
- Top goalscorer: League: Obilor Okeke (6); All: David Hickson Gyedu; Johannes Nuñez; Obilor Okeke (7 goals each)
- Highest home attendance: 3,501 (vs. Vålerenga, Eliteserien, 26 May 2025)
- Lowest home attendance: 1,327 (vs. Haugesund, Eliteserien, 2 November 2025)
- Average home league attendance: 2,151
- Biggest win: 5–0 vs Strømsgodset (H); Eliteserien, 22 June 2025; 5–0 vs Kristiansund (A); Eliteserien, 26 July 2025
- Biggest defeat: 0–3 vs Bodø/Glimt (A); Eliteserien, 27 April 2025; 1–4 vs Haugesund (H); Eliteserien, 2 November 2025
Home colours	Away colours

The 2025 season is the 86th season in the history of KFUM Oslo and their second consecutive season in the top flight of Norwegian football. The club will compete in the Eliteserien and the Norwegian Football Cup.

The team based in Oslo began the domestic league campaign with a modest performance, collecting 4 points from 7 matches. However, the situation was markedly different in the cup competition, where the team advanced to the fourth round after securing three victories.

== Squad ==
As of 23 December 2025

No.	Player	Nationality	Date of birth (age)	Signed from	Signed in	Contract ends	Apps	Goals
Goalkeepers
1	Emil Ødegaard	(Norway)	29 April 1999 (aged 26)	(Norway) Lillestrøm	2021	2025	110	0
12	William da Rocha	(Norway)	15 June 2002 (aged 23)	(Norway) Kjelsås	2024	2026	6	0
31	Henri Sørlie	(Norway)	4 April 2007 (aged 18)	(Norway) Langhus	2023	Undisclosed	1	0
Defenders
2	Daniel Schneider	(Norway)	1 March 2002 (aged 23)	(Norway) Lyn	2025	2028	25	0
3	Ayoub Aleesami	(Norway)	9 February 1996 (aged 29)	(Norway) Fredrikstad	2022	Undisclosed	80	4
5	Fredrik Berglie	(Norway)	28 December 1996 (aged 28)	(Norway) Sandefjord	2025	2027	28	0
13	Brage Skaret	(Norway)	28 April 2002 (aged 23)	(Norway) Fredrikstad	2025	2028	9	0
15	Mathias Tønnessen	(Norway)	22 November 2003 (aged 22)	(Norway) Skeid	2018	2026	73	0
16	Jonas Hjorth	(Norway)	30 January 2001 (aged 24)	(Norway) Follo	2023	2027	70	4
33	Amin Nouri	(Norway)	10 January 1990 (aged 35)	(Norway) HamKam	2024	2025	59	2
42	David Hickson Gyedu	(Norway)	9 July 1997 (aged 28)	(Norway) Skeid	2024	2026	65	9
Midfielders
6	Mansour Sinyan	(Norway)	13 July 1999 (aged 26)	(Sweden) Östersunds FK	2025	2027	5	1
7	Robin Rasch (captain)	(Norway)	10 January 1994 (aged 31)	(Norway) Follo	2016	2027	243	44
8	Simen Hestnes	(Norway)	5 February 1996 (aged 29)	(Norway) Skeid	2022	2026	134	21
14	Håkon Helland Hoseth	(Norway)	19 March 1999 (aged 26)	(Norway) Ullern	2020	2028	146	11
17	Teodor Berg Haltvik	(Norway)	9 April 2000 (aged 25)	(Norway) Raufoss	2023	2025	78	6
21	Sondre Halvorsen	(Norway)	3 August 2004 (aged 21)	(Norway) Follo	2023	Undisclosed	3	0
25	Sverre Sandal	(Norway)	6 June 2003 (aged 22)	(Norway) Nordstrand	2022	2025	96	8
30	Marko Vuckovic	(Norway)	6 April 2010 (aged 15)	(Norway) Vålerenga	2025	2028	1	0
Forwards
9	Henrik Udahl	(Norway)	12 January 1997 (aged 28)	(Norway) HamKam	2025	2025	10	0
10	Moussa Njie	(Norway)	2 September 1995 (aged 30)	(Norway) Sandefjord	2022	2027	91	18
11	Bilal Njie	(Somalia)	13 June 1998 (aged 27)	(Norway) Odd	2025	2027	51	17
19	Niclas Schjøth Semmen	(Norway)	13 November 2002 (aged 23)	(Norway) Drøbak-Frogn	2024	Undisclosed	15	3
22	Bjørn Martin Kristensen	(Philippines)	4 May 2002 (aged 23)	(Norway) Aalesund	2025	Undisclosed	32	3
28	Mame Mor Ndiaye	(Senegal)	23 May 1997 (aged 28)	(Norway) Åsane	2024	2025	49	7

=== New contracts ===
Date	Pos.	No.	Player	Until	Ref.
6 January 2025	DF	33	(Norway) Amin Nouri	2025	
21 October 2025	MF	14	(Norway) Håkon Helland Hoseth	2028	
29 October 2025	FW	10	(Norway) Moussa Njie	2027	
5 December 2025	MF	7	(Norway) Robin Rasch	2027	

== Transfers ==
=== In ===
Date	Pos.	No.	Player	From	Fee	Ref.
1 January 2025	FW	22	(Philippines) Bjørn Martin Kristensen	(Norway) Aalesund	Undisclosed	
1 January 2025	MF	6	(Norway) Mansour Sinyan	(Sweden) Östersunds FK	Undisclosed	
7 January 2025	DF	5	(Norway) Fredrik Berglie	(Norway) Sandefjord	Free transfer	
15 March 2025	DF	2	(Norway) Daniel Schneider	(Norway) Lyn	Undisclosed	
14 August 2025	FW	11	(Somalia) Bilal Njie	(Norway) Odd	Free transfer	
18 August 2025	DF	13	(Norway) Brage Skaret	(Norway) Fredrikstad	Undisclosed	

=== Out ===
Date	Pos.	No.	Player	To	Fee	Ref.
31 December 2024	DF	5	(Norway) Akinsola Akinyemi	(Norway) Skeid	Released	
31 December 2024	GK	12	(Norway) Andreas Vedeler	(Norway) Bærum	Released	
31 December 2024	GK	35	(Norway) Idar Lysgård	(Sweden) Vasalunds IF	Released	
31 December 2024	FW	99	(Norway) Adama Diomande	(United Arab Emirates) Forte Virtus	Released	
8 January 2025	MF	6	(Norway) Remi-André Svindland	(Norway) Bryne	Undisclosed	
4 February 2025	DF	29	(Norway) Kristoffer Lassen Harrison	(Norway) Moss	Undisclosed	
10 March 2025	MF	30	(Norway) Adnan Hadzic	(Norway) Skeid	Undisclosed	
15 March 2025	DF	2	(Norway) Haitam Aleesami	(Norway) Bodø/Glimt	Undisclosed	
15 August 2025	FW	11	(Norway) Obilor Okeke	(Sweden) Hammarby IF	Undisclosed	
18 August 2025	FW	9	(Norway) Johannes Nuñez	(Norway) Fredrikstad	€600,000	

=== Loans in ===
Date	Pos.	No.	Player	From	Date until	Ref.
2 September 2025	FW	9	(Norway) Henrik Udahl	(Norway) HamKam	End of season	

=== Loans out ===
Date	Pos.	No.	Player	To	Date until	Ref.
25 March 2025	FW	–	(Norway) Yasir Sa'Ad	(Norway) Skeid	End of season (Note: On 23 July 2025, Sa'Ad's loan was extended until the end of the season.)	
26 March 2025	DF	23	(Norway) Mohammed Hopsdal Abbas	(Norway) Strømmen	End of season	
24 July 2025	DF	26	(Norway) Joachim Prent-Eckbo	(Norway) Asker	End of season (Note: On 26 August 2025, Prent-Eckbo's loan was extended until the end of the season.)	
2 September 2025	DF	4	(The Gambia) Momodou Lion Njie	(Norway) Sarpsborg 08	End of season	

== Pre-season and friendlies ==
1 February 2025 Friendly	KFUM	6–0	Arendal	Oslo
14:00 CET (UTC+1)	Okeke 14'; Kristensen 31'; Marhuag 53'; Ndiaue 54'; Haltvik 57', 65'	Report		Stadium: KFUM Arena

10 February 2025 Friendly	KFUM (Norway)	2–0	(Sweden) AIK	Málaga, Spain
14:00 CET (UTC+1)	Nuñez 29' (pen.), 44'	Report	Thychosen (yellow card) 47'; Wilson Omondi (yellow card) 47'	Stadium: Marbella Football Center

15 February 2025 Friendly	KFUM	0–0	Kristiansund
13:00 CET (UTC+1)		Report

23 February 2025 Friendly	KFUM	1–1	Sarpsborg 08	Lillestrøm
15:00 CET (UTC+1)	Hestnes 1'	Report	Guðjohnsen 67'	Stadium: LSK-Hallen

28 February 2025 Friendly	Lillestrøm	0–5	KFUM	Lillestrøm
13:00 CET (UTC+1)		Report	Sandal 39', 53'; Hestnes 59'; Tønnessen 67'; Hoseth 71'	Stadium: LSK-Hallen

8 March 2025 Friendly	Fredrikstad	0–1	KFUM	Fredrikstad
14:00 CET (UTC+1)		Report	Tønnessen 7'	Stadium: Fredrikstad Stadion

15 March 2025 Friendly	Sandefjord	1–0	KFUM	Sandefjord
13:00 CET (UTC+1)	Patoulidis 49'	Report		Stadium: Sandefjord Arena

22 March 2025 Friendly	Strømsgodset	2–1	KFUM	Drammen
15:30 CET (UTC+1)	Therkelsen 18'; Mehnert 44'	Report	Gyedu 33'	Stadium: Marienlyst Stadion

== Competitions ==
=== Overview ===
Competition	First match	Last match	Starting round	Final position	Record							
Competition	First match	Last match	Starting round	Final position	Pld	W	D	L	GF	GA	GD	Win %
Eliteserien	30 March 2025	30 November 2025	Matchday 1	12th	30	8	11	11	42	41	+1	26.67
2025 Norwegian Cup	13 April 2025	25 June 2025	First round	Quarter-finals	5	4	0	1	11	3	+8	80.00
2025–26 Norwegian Cup	24 September 2025	See 2026 season	Third Round	See 2026 season	1	1	0	0	3	1	+2	100.00
Total					36	13	11	12	56	45	+11	36.11

Source: Soccerway

=== Eliteserien ===
==== League table ====
Pos	Team	Pld	W	D	L	GF	GA	GD	Pts	Qualification or relegation
10	Molde	30	12	3	15	46	42	+4	39	
11	HamKam	30	10	7	13	42	47	−5	37	
12	KFUM Oslo	30	8	11	11	42	41	+1	35	
13	Kristiansund	30	9	7	14	34	59	−25	34	
14	Bryne (R)	30	8	7	15	37	56	−19	31	Qualification for the relegation play-offs

Source: Football Association of Norway (in Norwegian)
Rules for classification: 1) Points; 2) Goal difference; 3) Goals scored; 4) Head-to-head points; 5) Head-to-head goal difference; 6) Head-to-head goals scored.
(R) Relegated

==== Results summary ====
Overall								Home						Away					
Pld	W	D	L	GF	GA	GD	Pts	W	D	L	GF	GA	GD	W	D	L	GF	GA	GD
30	8	11	11	42	41	+1	35	5	5	5	26	22	+4	3	6	6	16	19	−3

Source: Soccerway

==== Results by round ====
Round	1	2	3	4	5	6	7	8	9	10	11	12	13	14	15	16	17	18	19	20	21	22	23	24	25	26	27	28	29	30
Ground	H	A	H	A	A	H	A	H	A	H	A	H	A	H	A	H	A	H	H	A	H	A	H	A	H	A	H	A	H	A
Result	W	L	L	L	D	L	L	L	D	W	W	D	W	W	W	W	D	D	D	L	D	D	W	D	D	L	L	D	L	L
Position	2	9	12	13	13	13	15	15	15	14	13	13	11	10	9	7	8	7	7	8	9	8	6	8	8	10	10	10	12	12

A = Away; H = Home; W = Win; D = Draw; L = Loss

==== Matches ====
The match schedule was announced on 20 December 2024.

Win Draw Loss Fixtures

30 March 2025 1	KFUM	3–1	Sandefjord	Oslo
17:00 CEST (UTC+2)	Nuñez 45+2'; Hestnes 63'; Mou. Njie 77'; Tønnessen (yellow card) 90+3'	Report	Risan Mørk 43'; Kristiansen (yellow card) 70'; Egeli (yellow card) 86'	Stadium: KFUM Arena; Attendance: 1,806; Referee: Christian Moen

6 April 2025 2	Viking	3–1	KFUM	Stavanger
19:15 CEST (UTC+2)	Urbančič 39'; Austbø (yellow card) 53'; Falchener (yellow card) 62'; Tønnessen 74' (o.g.); Tripić 83' (pen.)	Report	Mom. Njie (yellow card) 20'; Mou. Njie 29'; Gyedu (yellow card) 40'	Stadium: Lyse Arena; Attendance: 12,612; Referee: Tore Hansen

21 April 2025 3	KFUM	1–3	Sarpsborg 08	Oslo
17:00 CEST (UTC+2)	Sandal (red card) 21'; Semmen 86'; Kristensen (yellow card) 89'	Report	Karlsbakk 3', 53'; Halvorsen 28'	Stadium: KFUM Arena; Attendance: 1,898; Referee: Mohammad Usman Aslam

27 April 2025 4	Bodø/Glimt	3–0	KFUM	Bodø
17:00 CEST (UTC+2)	Evjen (yellow card) 15'; Høgh 80', 87' (pen.); Saltnes 90'	Report	Rasch (yellow card) 46'	Stadium: Aspmyra Stadion; Attendance: 5,910; Referee: Mathias Støfringshaug

2 May 2025 5	HamKam	0–0	KFUM	Hamar
19:00 CEST (UTC+2)	Kirkevold (yellow card) 42'; Bjarnason (yellow card) 81'	Report	Semmen (yellow card) 75'; Haltvik (yellow card) 82'	Stadium: Briskeby Stadion; Attendance: 2,828; Referee: Sigurd Smehus Kringstad

11 May 2025 6	KFUM	1–3	Tromsø	Oslo
17:00 CEST (UTC+2)	Nuñez 1'; Tønnessen (yellow card) 45+3'	Report	Skjærvik 6'; Kinteh (yellow card) 79'; Camões 90+2'; Antonsen 90+4'	Stadium: KFUM Arena; Attendance: 2,157; Referee: Eivind Bodding

16 May 2025 7	Fredrikstad	1–0	KFUM	Fredrikstad
18:00 CEST (UTC+2)	Sørløkk 5'; Fall (yellow card) 53'	Report	Sandal (yellow card) 34'; Okeke (yellow card) 53'	Stadium: Fredrikstad Stadion; Attendance: 11,578; Referee: Sivert Øksnes Amland

26 May 2025 8	KFUM	0–1	Vålerenga	Oslo
19:00 CEST (UTC+2)	Kristensen (yellow card) 19'; Hestnes (red card) 40'; Aleesami (yellow card) 72'	Report	Thorvaldsen (yellow card) 54', (goal) 65'; Olsen (yellow card) 88'	Stadium: KFUM Arena; Attendance: 3,501; Referee: Marius Hansen Grøtta

1 June 2025 9	Rosenborg	1–1	KFUM	Trondheim
17:00 CEST (UTC+2)	Ceïde (yellow card) 47'; Jenssen (yellow card) 69'; Broholm 74'	Report	Aleesami (yellow card) 22'; Sandal (yellow card) 77'; Ndiaye 83'	Stadium: Lerkendal Stadion; Attendance: 12,311; Referee: Svein Tore Sinnes

22 June 2025 10	KFUM	5–0	Strømsgodset	Oslo
17:00 CEST (UTC+2)	Sandal (yellow card) 35'; Gyedu 53'; Okeke 59', 82', (yellow card) 83'; Hjort 69'; Haltvik 90+2'	Report	Krasniqi (yellow card) 35'; Enersen (yellow card) 76'; Valsvik (yellow card) 89'	Stadium: KFUM Arena; Attendance: 1,927; Referee: Christian Moen

29 June 2025 11	Molde	2–3	KFUM	Molde
17:00 CEST (UTC+2)	Daga (yellow card) 18'; Karlstrøm (yellow card) 32'; Berisha 49' (pen.); Abdullai 71'	Report	Nuñez 34' (pen.); Hestnes 41'; Aleesami (yellow card) 45'; Okeke 56'	Stadium: Aker Stadion; Attendance: 5,544; Referee: Marius Waskaas Lien

6 July 2025 12	KFUM	1–1	Bryne	Oslo
14:30 CEST (UTC+2)	Njie (yellow card) 64'; Steffensen 79' (o.g.); Gyedu (yellow card) 84'	Report	Kryger 53'; de Boer (red card) 64'	Stadium: KFUM Arena; Attendance: 1,423; Referee: Eivind Bodding

13 July 2025 13	Haugesund	0–2	KFUM	Haugesund
17:00 CEST (UTC+2)		Report	Aleesami 43'; Kristensen (yellow card) 78'; Sandal 86'	Stadium: Haugesund Stadion; Attendance: 3,178; Referee: Sivert Øksnes Amland

19 July 2025 14	KFUM	2–0	Brann	Oslo
14:00 CEST (UTC+2)	Nuñez 31'; Gyedu 45'; Schneider (yellow card) 59' (yellow-red card) 74'	Report	Guðmundsson (yellow card) 50'; Kornvig (yellow card) 55'; Sørensen (yellow card) 82'; Helland (yellow card) 82' (yellow-red card) 90'	Stadium: KFUM Arena; Attendance: 3,017; Referee: Rohit Saggi

26 July 2025 15	Kristiansund	0–5	KFUM	Kristiansund
17:00 CEST (UTC+2)	Alvheim (yellow card) 27'; Igor (yellow card) 65'; Olsen (yellow card) 79'	Report	Nuñez 3'; Hjort 25'; Kristensen 73'; Okeke 87'; Sinyan 90+1'	Stadium: Nordmøre Stadion; Attendance: 3,107; Referee: Mohammad Usman Aslam

3 August 2025 16	KFUM	4–1	Rosenborg	Oslo
17:00 CEST (UTC+2)	Gyedu 17'; Sinyan (yellow card) 34'; Okeke 73', 76'; Nouri (yellow card) 80'; Volden 90' (o.g.)	Report	Islamović 53' (pen.); Nordli (yellow card) 80'	Stadium: KFUM Arena; Attendance: 3,003; Referee: Daniel Higraff

10 August 2025 17	Bryne	0–0	KFUM	Bryne
17:00 CEST (UTC+2)	Steffensen (yellow card) 35'	Report	Sandal (yellow card) 27'; Aleesami (yellow card) 76'	Stadium: Bryne Stadion; Attendance: 2,866; Referee: Marius Waskaas Lien

17 August 2025 18	KFUM	0–0	Molde	Oslo
17:00 CEST (UTC+2)	Sandal (yellow card) 40'; Mom. Njie (yellow card) 90'; Hjort (yellow card) 90+7'	Report	Risa (yellow card) 49'; Abdullai (yellow card) 83'	Stadium: KFUM Arena; Attendance: 2,123; Referee: Sigurd Smehus Kringstad

22 August 2025 19	KFUM	2–2	HamKam	Oslo
19:00 CEST (UTC+2)	Hestnes 48'; Hoseth 65'; Kristensen (yellow card) 87'	Report	Roaldsøy 14', (yellow card) 68'; Simenstad 88'; Amundsen-Day (yellow card) 90'	Stadium: KFUM Arena; Attendance: 1,911; Referee: Sivert Øksnes Amland

31 August 2025 20	Tromsø	2–0	KFUM	Tromsø
17:00 CEST (UTC+2)	Camões 3'; Edvardsson (yellow card) 51'; Hjertø-Dahl (yellow card) 59'; Cornic 68'; Kinteh (red card) 85'	Report		Stadium: Romssa Arena; Attendance: 4,356; Referee: Svein Tore Sinnes

14 September 2025 21	KFUM	2–2	Viking	Oslo
17:00 CEST (UTC+2)	Gyedu 1'; Hestnes 19', (yellow card) 72'; Sandal (yellow card) 69'; B. Njie (yellow card) 70'	Report	D'Agostino 5', (yellow card) 55'; Roseth 73'	Stadium: KFUM Arena; Attendance: 2,323; Referee: Eivind Bodding

20 September 2025 22	Vålerenga	1–1	KFUM	Oslo
18:00 CEST (UTC+2)	Nogueira (yellow card) 60'; Hedvall (yellow card) 62'; Thorvaldsen 90+8'	Report	Sandal (yellow card) 34', (goal) 63'; M. Njie (yellow card) 56'; B. Njie (yellow card) 56'; Hjorth (yellow card) 66'	Stadium: Intility Arena; Attendance: 13,479; Referee: Kristoffer Hagenes

1 October 2025 23	KFUM	2–1	Fredrikstad	Oslo
19:00 CEST (UTC+2)	Gyedu 28'; B. Njie 41'; Berglie (yellow card) 56'; Tønnessen (yellow card) 89'	Report	Shein (yellow card) 82'; Sørløkk 90+3'	Stadium: KFUM Arena; Attendance: 1,539; Referee: Marius Hansen Grøtta

5 October 2025 24	Strømsgodset	1–1	KFUM	Drammen
17:00 CEST (UTC+2)	Bakke (yellow card) 75'; Dahl 90+5'	Report	M. Njie (yellow card) 68'; Ndiaye (yellow card) 83'; Hestnes (yellow card) 87'; Kristensen 90+1'	Stadium: Marienlyst Stadion; Attendance: 3,852; Referee: Sivert Øksnes Amland

19 October 2025 25	KFUM	1–1	Kristiansund	Oslo
17:00 CEST (UTC+2)	Sandal (yellow card) 50'; Ndiaye 80'	Report	Ulvestad 3'	Stadium: KFUM Arena; Attendance: 1,435; Referee: Tore Hansen

25 October 2025 26	Sarpsborg 08	2–1	KFUM	Sarpsborg
18:00 CEST (UTC+2)	Karlsbakk 8' (pen.), (yellow card) 90+5'; Sørli 20'	Report	Kristensen (yellow card) 22'; Sandal 76'; Tønnessen (yellow card) 79'; Nouri (yellow card) 90+7'	Stadium: Sarpsborg Stadion; Attendance: 3,886; Referee: Marius Waskaas Lien

2 November 2025 27	KFUM	1–4	Haugesund	Oslo
17:00 CET (UTC+1)	Ndiaye 67'	Report	Niyukuri 10'; Diarra 29', 47', 50'; Koskela (yellow card) 42'; Bizoza (yellow card) 64'; Fischer (yellow card) 86'	Stadium: KFUM Arena; Attendance: 1,327; Referee: Svein Tore Sinnes

9 November 2025 28	Brann	1–1	KFUM	Bergen
17:00 CET (UTC+1)	Kornvig (yellow card) 37'; Mathisen 57'	Report	Tønnessen (yellow card) 6'; Berglie (yellow card) 16'; Nouri 74'	Stadium: Brann Stadion; Attendance: 14,560; Referee: Christian Moen

21 November 2025 29	KFUM	1–2	Bodø/Glimt	Oslo
19:00 CET (UTC+1)	Ndiaye (yellow card) 34'; Haltvik 46'; Berglie (yellow card) 63'; Nouri (yellow card) 66'; Tønnessen (yellow card) 72'; Udahl (yellow card) 90+9'	Report	Sjøvold 30'; Jørgensen 90+4'	Stadium: KFUM Arena; Attendance: 2,869; Referee: Mohammad Usman Aslam

30 November 2025 30	Sandefjord	2–0	KFUM	Sandefjord
17:00 CET (UTC+1)	Smajlović (yellow card) 8', (goal) 37'; Egerli 45+3'; Melchior (yellow card) 80'	Report	Hjorth (yellow card) 30'; Haltvik (yellow card) 55'	Stadium: Sandefjord Arena; Attendance: 5,013; Referee: Eivind Bodding

=== Norwegian Cup ===
==== 2025 ====
13 April 2025 First round	Grei	1–5	KFUM	Oslo
16:00 CEST (UTC+2)	Barrow 23'; Løvlund (yellow card) 86'	Report	Mou. Njie 25'; Gyedu 32'; Sandal (yellow card) 45'; Nuñez 69', 77'; Semmen 74'	Stadium: Grei kunstgress Referee: Mohammad Hafezi

24 April 2025 Second round	Ready	0–3	KFUM	Oslo
18:00 CEST (UTC+2)	Seip (yellow card) 56'; Dahl (yellow card) 89'	Report	Rasch 42'; Semmen 70'; Mou. Njie 90' (pen.)	Stadium: Gressbanen; Referee: Stian Røvig Sletner

8 May 2025 Third round	Tromsø	0–1	KFUM	Tromsø
18:00 CEST (UTC+2)	Norheim (yellow card) 47'	Report	Hjort 23'; Aleesami (yellow card) 62'; Kristensen (yellow card) 69'; Nuñez (yellow card) 90'	Stadium: Romssa Arena; Attendance: 1,306; Referee: Kristoffer Hagenes

20 May 2025 Fourth round	Bryne	0–2	KFUM	Bryne
18:00 CEST (UTC+2)	Norheim (yellow card) 64' (yellow-red card) 76'; Husebø (yellow card) 67'	Report	Berglie (yellow card) 38'; Okeke 40'; Sandal (yellow card) 49'; Hestnes (yellow card) 63'; Gyedu 78'	Stadium: Bryne Stadion; Attendance: 1,422; Referee: Rohit Saggi

25 June 2025 Quarter-finals	Lillestrøm	2–0	KFUM	Lillestrøm
18:00 CEST (UTC+2)	Karlsbakk 51'; Diop 84'	Report	Kristensen (yellow card) 26'; Tønnessen (yellow card) 38'	Stadium: Åråsen Stadion; Attendance: 6,152; Referee: Marius Hansen Grøtta

==== 2025–26 ====
17 September 2025 Third round	Kongsvinger	1–3	KFUM	Kongsvinger
18:00 CEST (UTC+2)	Haren 68'	Report	Njie 9'; Nilsson 75' (o.g.); Kristensen 78'	Stadium: Gjemselund Stadion; Attendance: 877; Referee: Marius Waskaas Lien

The remaining rounds took place during the 2026 season.

== Squad statistics ==
=== Appearances and goals ===
Players with no appearances are not included on the list.

No.	Pos	Nat	Player	Total		Eliteserien		2025 Norwegian Cup		2025–26 Norwegian Cup	
No.	Pos	Nat	Player	Apps	Goals	Apps	Goals	Apps	Goals	Apps	Goals
1	GK	(Norway) NOR	Emil Ødegaard	35	0	29	0	5	0	1	0
2	DF	(Norway) NOR	Daniel Schneider	25	0	20	0	4	0	1	0
3	DF	(Norway) NOR	Ayoub Aleesami	30	1	24	1	5	0	1	0
4 (Note: Njie wore number 4 until his loan on 2 September 2025. Mehl replaced him as number 4.)	DF	(The Gambia) GAM	Momodou Lion Njie	14	0	10	0	4	0	0	0
4	DF	(Norway) NOR	Magnus Kiperberg Mehl	1	0	0	0	0	0	1	0
5	DF	(Norway) NOR	Fredrik Berglie	28	0	25	0	3	0	0	0
6	MF	(Norway) NOR	Mansour Sinyan	5	1	3	1	1	0	1	0
7	MF	(Norway) NOR	Robin Rasch	10	1	8	0	2	1	0	0
8	MF	(Norway) NOR	Simen Hestnes	31	4	26	4	4	0	1	0
9 (Note: Nuñez wore number 9 until his departure on 18 August 2025. Udahl replaced him as number 9.)	FW	(Norway) NOR	Johannes Nuñez	16	7	13	5	3	2	0	0
9	FW	(Norway) NOR	Henrik Udahl	10	0	9	0	0	0	1	0
10	FW	(Norway) NOR	Moussa Njie	23	4	20	2	3	2	0	0
11 (Note: Okeke wore number 11 until his departure on 15 August 2025. Njie replaced him as number 11.)	FW	(Norway) NOR	Obilor Okeke	14	7	11	6	3	1	0	0
11	FW	(Somalia) SOM	Bilal Njie	14	2	13	1	0	0	1	1
12	GK	(Norway) NOR	William da Rocha	1	0	1	0	0	0	0	0
13	DF	(Norway) NOR	Brage Skaret	9	0	8	0	0	0	1	0
14	MF	(Norway) NOR	Håkon Helland Hoseth	20	1	18	1	2	0	0	0
15	DF	(Norway) NOR	Mathias Tønnessen	34	0	29	0	4	0	1	0
16	DF	(Norway) NOR	Jonas Hjorth	33	3	27	2	5	1	1	0
17	MF	(Norway) NOR	Teodor Berg Haltvik	32	2	26	2	5	0	1	0
19	FW	(Norway) NOR	Niclas Schjøth Semmen	10	3	7	1	3	2	0	0
22	FW	(Philippines) PHI	Bjørn Martin Kristensen	32	3	26	2	5	0	1	1
25	MF	(Norway) NOR	Sverre Sandal	31	3	26	3	4	0	1	0
26	DF	(Norway) NOR	Joachim Prent-Eckbo	4	0	1	0	3	0	0	0
27	MF	(Norway) NOR	Thomas Ekroll	1	0	0	0	1	0	0	0
28	FW	(Senegal) SEN	Mame Mor Ndiaye	22	3	20	3	1	0	1	0
30	MF	(Norway) NOR	Marko Vuckovic	1	0	1	0	0	0	0	0
33	DF	(Norway) NOR	Amin Nouri	31	1	25	1	5	0	1	0
42	DF	(Norway) NOR	David Hickson Gyedu	31	7	27	5	4	2	0	0
