= 2023 KFUM-Kameratene Oslo season =

KFUM Oslo
2023 season
- Head coach: Johannes Moesgaard
- Stadium: KFUM Arena
- 1. divisjon: 2nd (promoted)
- Norwegian Cup: Fourth round
- Top goalscorer: League: Johannes Nuñez (10); All: Johannes Nuñez (12)
Home colours	Away colours

The 2023 season was KFUM-Kameratene Oslo's 84th season in existence and their 5th consecutive season in Norwegian First Division. It was Johannes Moesgaard's first season as head coach.

On 14 December 2022, it was announced that head coach Jørgen Isnes left the club to take over Strømsgodset. On 23 December, it was announced that assistant coach Johannes Moesgaard took over as head coach.

On 5 December 2023, after winning against Skeid in the penultimate round of the series, KFUM secured the historic promotion to Eliteserien.

== Players ==
=== First team squad ===
As of 15 September 2023

Note: Flags indicate national team as defined under FIFA eligibility rules; some limited exceptions apply. Players may hold more than one non-FIFA nationality.

No.	Pos.	Nation	Player
1	GK	NOR	Emil Ødegaard
2	DF	NOR	Keivan Ghaedamini
4	DF	NOR	Momodou Lion Njie
5	DF	NOR	Akinsola Akinyemi
6	MF	NOR	Remi-André Svindland
7	MF	NOR	Robin Rasch
8	MF	NOR	Simen Hestnes
9	FW	NOR	Johannes Nuñez
11	FW	NOR	Moussa Njie
12	GK	NOR	Andreas Vedeler
13	GK	NOR	Morten Stakkeng Vang
14	MF	NOR	Håkon Helland Hoseth
15	DF	NOR	Mathias Tønnessen
16	DF	NOR	Jonas Lange Hjorth

No.	Pos.	Nation	Player
17	FW	NOR	Teodor Berg Haltvik
18	FW	NOR	Obilor Denzel Okeke
19	FW	NOR	Yasir Abdiqadir Sa'Ad
20	DF	NOR	Ayoub Aleesami
21	FW	NOR	Sondre Spieler Halvorsen
22	DF	NOR	Mohamed Abbas
23	MF	NOR	Kristian Solberg Aarstad
25	MF	NOR	Sverre Hakimi Sandal
26	DF	NOR	Joachim Prent-Eckbo
27	FW	NOR	Andreas Hegdahl Gundersen
28	FW	NOR	Jones El-Abdellaoui (on loan from Vålerenga)
29	DF	NOR	Kristoffer Lassen Harrison
30	MF	NOR	Adnan Hadzic
33	DF	NOR	William Alexander Silfver-Ramage

== Transfers ==
=== Winter ===
In: Note: Flags indicate national team as defined under FIFA eligibility rules; some limited exceptions apply. Players may hold more than one non-FIFA nationality.

No.	Pos.	Nation	Player
5	DF	NOR	Akinsola Akinyemi (from Grorud)
12	GK	NOR	Andreas Vedeler (from Eidsvold Turn)
13	GK	NOR	Morten Stakkeng Vang (promoted from junior squad)
16	DF	NOR	Jonas Lange Hjorth (from Follo)
17	MF	NOR	Teodor Berg Haltvik (from Raufoss)
18	FW	NOR	Obilor Okeke (from Fredrikstad)
19	FW	NOR	Yasir Sa'Ad (from Skeid 2)
22	FW	NOR	Petter Nosa Dahl (on loan from Bodø/Glimt)
25	MF	NOR	Sverre Sandal (loan return from Nordstrand)
27	FW	NOR	Andreas Hegdahl Gundersen (from Levanger)
29	DF	NOR	Kristoffer Lassen Harrison (from Stabæk)

Out: Note: Flags indicate national team as defined under FIFA eligibility rules; some limited exceptions apply. Players may hold more than one non-FIFA nationality.

No.	Pos.	Nation	Player
5	DF	NOR	Aaron Kiil Olsen (to Vålerenga)
12	GK	NOR	Mats Gulbrandsen Viken (to Sandefjord)
17	DF	NOR	Fredrik Kristensen Dahl (to Strømsgodset)
19	FW	NOR	Philip Eng Romsaas (released)
21	MF	NOR	Tore André Sørås (to HamKam)
22	FW	NOR	Petter Nosa Dahl (to Bodø/Glimt)
27	MF	NOR	Mohammed Mahnin (to Ull/Kisa)
28	GK	NOR	Jonas Vatne Brauti (to Arendal)
29	FW	NOR	Filip Møller Delaveris (loan return to Brann)
33	DF	NOR	Jørgen Hammer (retired)

=== Summer ===
In: Note: Flags indicate national team as defined under FIFA eligibility rules; some limited exceptions apply. Players may hold more than one non-FIFA nationality.

No.	Pos.	Nation	Player
21	FW	NOR	Sondre Spieler Halvorsen (from Follo)
22	DF	NOR	Mohammed Hopsdal Abbas (from Nordstrand)
28	MF	NOR	Jones El-Abdellaoui (on loan from Vålerenga)
30	MF	NOR	Adnan Hadzic (from (Denmark) SønderjyskE)
31	GK	IRI	Sosha Makani (free transfer)
33	DF	NOR	William Silvfer-Ramage (promoted from junior squad)

Out: Note: Flags indicate national team as defined under FIFA eligibility rules; some limited exceptions apply. Players may hold more than one non-FIFA nationality.

No.	Pos.	Nation	Player
3	DF	NOR	Dadi Dodou Gaye (to Tromsø)
10	FW	NOR	Thomas Klemetsen Jakobsen (to Moss)
22	FW	NOR	Petter Nosa Dahl (loan return to Bodø/Glimt)
37	MF	NOR	Håkon Stavrum (retired)

== Competitions ==
=== Overview ===
Competition	First match	Last match	Starting round	Final position	Record							
Competition	First match	Last match	Starting round	Final position	Pld	W	D	L	GF	GA	GD	Win %
1. divisjon	10 April 2023	12 November 2023	Matchday 1	Runners-up	30	17	7	6	51	31	+20	56.67
Norwegian Cup	24 May 2023	28 June 2023	First round	Fourth round	4	3	0	1	10	6	+4	75.00
Total					34	20	7	7	61	37	+24	58.82

Last updated: 12 November 2023
Source: Soccerway

=== 1. divisjon ===
==== League table ====
Pos	Team	Pld	W	D	L	GF	GA	GD	Pts	Promotion, qualification or relegation
1	Fredrikstad (C, P)	30	18	10	2	50	23	+27	64	Promotion to Eliteserien
2	KFUM Oslo (P)	30	17	7	6	51	31	+20	58	Promotion to Eliteserien
3	Kongsvinger	30	16	4	10	53	39	+14	52	Qualification for the promotion play-offs
4	Kristiansund (O, P)	30	14	8	8	56	38	+18	50	Qualification for the promotion play-offs
5	Start	30	12	10	8	49	36	+13	46	Qualification for the promotion play-offs

Source: Norwegian Football Federation (in Norwegian)
Rules for classification: 1) Points; 2) Goal difference; 3) Goals scored; 4) Head-to-head points; 5) Head-to-head goal difference; 6) Head-to-head goals scored.
(C) Champions; (O) Play-off winners; (P) Promoted

==== Results summary ====
Overall								Home						Away					
Pld	W	D	L	GF	GA	GD	Pts	W	D	L	GF	GA	GD	W	D	L	GF	GA	GD
30	17	7	6	51	31	+20	58	10	3	2	27	12	+15	7	4	4	24	19	+5

Last updated: 12 November 2023.

==== Results by round ====
Round	1	2	3	4	5	6	7	8	9	10	11	12	13	14	15	16	17	18	19	20	21	22	23	24	25	26	27	28	29	30
Ground	H	A	H	A	H	A	H	A	H	A	H	A	H	A	A	H	A	H	A	H	A	H	A	H	A	H	H	A	H	A
Result	D	L	L	D	D	D	W	L	W	W	W	W	W	L	W	W	W	W	L	L	D	W	W	W	W	W	D	W	W	D
Position	6	15	16	15	16	16	12	14	11	9	7	6	3	5	5	4	3	3	3	3	4	3	2	2	2	2	2	2	2	2

A = Away; H = Home; W = Win; D = Draw; L = Loss

==== Matches ====
The league fixtures were announced on 20 December 2023.

10 April 2023 1	KFUM Oslo	1–1	Sogndal	Oslo
15:00 CEST (UTC+2)	Klemetsen Jakobsen 59'; Nosa Dahl (yellow card) 80'	Report	Twum (yellow card) 29' (goal) 57'; Hoven (yellow card) 90+3'	Stadium: KFUM Arena; Attendance: 923; Referee: Mischa Huru Kellerhals

16 April 2023 2	Raufoss	4–0	KFUM Oslo	Raufoss
15:00 CEST (UTC+2)	Helmersen 10'; Gudjónsson 40'; Østerud 53'; Fremstad 69'; Hammer (yellow card) 78'; Fagernes (yellow card) 90+2'	Report	Aleesami (yellow card) 66'; Akinyemi (yellow card) 70'; Hestnes (yellow card) 90+4'	Stadium: Nammo Stadion; Attendance: 777; Referee: Jørgen Haugen

23 April 2023 3	KFUM Oslo	0–1	Ranheim	Oslo
15:00 CEST (UTC+2)	Hestnes (yellow card) 85'	Report	Solli 37'	Stadium: KFUM Arena; Attendance: 684; Referee: Anders Bodding

30 April 2023 4	Åsane	1–1	KFUM Oslo	Bergen
15:00 CEST (UTC+2)	Eng Strand (yellow card) 32'; Nygard 55'; Ndiaye (yellow card) 62'; Ueland (yellow card) 74'	Report	Aleesami (yellow card) 44'; Sandal 66'	Stadium: Åsane Arena; Attendance: 492; Referee: Martin Berg

3 May 2023 5	KFUM Oslo	2–2	Start	Oslo
18:00 CEST (UTC+2)	Svindland 25'; Nosa Dahl (yellow card) 37'; Rasch 90+1'	Report	Wormgoor (yellow card) 31'; Robstad (yellow card) 50'; Skogvold 56', 90+5'; Osestad (yellow card) 90'	Stadium: KFUM Arena; Attendance: 972; Referee: Eivind Bodding

6 May 2023 6	Mjøndalen	2–2	KFUM Oslo	Mjøndalen
15:00 CEST (UTC+2)	Jansen (yellow card) 40'; Hansen 45+1'; Lien 80'	Report	Svindland 1'; Sandal (yellow card) 39'; Hestnes 70'	Stadium: Consto Arena; Attendance: 1,095; Referee: Ajdin Medic

13 May 2023 7	KFUM Oslo	2–0	Kongsvinger	Oslo
15:00 CEST (UTC+2)	Okeke 37'; Svindland (yellow card) 77'; Nuñez 90+2' (yellow card) 90+2'	Report	Aamodt Eriksen (yellow card) 65'	Stadium: KFUM Arena; Attendance: 878; Referee: Henrikke Holm Nervik

16 May 2023 8	Fredrikstad	1–0	KFUM Oslo	Fredrikstad
18:00 CEST (UTC+2)	Stray Molde 22'	Report		Stadium: Fredrikstad Stadion; Attendance: 6,829; Referee: Magnus Nicolai Koløy

21 May 2023 9	KFUM Oslo	4–2	Moss	Oslo
17:00 CEST (UTC+2)	Rasch 48' (pen.) (yellow card) 90'; Lion Njie (yellow card) 55'; Gaye (yellow card) 78'; Sa'Ad (yellow card) 85'; Hestnes 87'; Lassen Harrison 90+4'; Nuñez 90+5'	Report	Farah 12' (penalty missed) 57'; Braga (yellow card) 36' (goal) 89'; Haugli (yellow card) 74'	Stadium: KFUM Arena; Attendance: 1,194; Referee: Mathias Støfringshaug

29 May 2023 10	Bryne	0–1	KFUM Oslo	Bryne
15:00 CEST (UTC+2)	Rotihaug (yellow card) 39'; Kryger (yellow card) 78'; Diaw (yellow card) 79'; Mneney (yellow card) 83'	Report	Rasch 13'; Tønnessen (yellow card) 66'	Stadium: Bryne Stadion; Attendance: 1,037; Referee: Eivind Bodding

4 June 2023 11	KFUM Oslo	2–0	Kristiansund	Oslo
15:00 CEST (UTC+2)	Rasch 61'; Sandal 85'	Report	Kartum (yellow card) 44'; Mawa (yellow card) 57'	Stadium: KFUM Arena; Attendance: 1,031; Referee: Ali al Hatam

11 June 2023 12	Skeid	0–4	KFUM Oslo	Oslo
15:00 CEST (UTC+2)	Tønsberg Andresen (yellow card) 17'; Naustdal (yellow card) 85'	Report	Nuñez 19'; Rasch 43' (yellow card) 51'; Berg Haltvik 78'; Sa'Ad 86'	Stadium: Nordre Åsen Idrettspark; Attendance: 657; Referee: Stian Røvig Sletner

25 June 2023 13	KFUM Oslo	3–1	Sandnes Ulf	Oslo
15:00 CEST (UTC+2)	Hestnes 11'; Nuñez 14'; Svindland 35'; Lion Njie (yellow card) 39'	Report	Øregaard (yellow card) 37'; Høiland (yellow card) 39'; Jensen 79'; Hiim (yellow card) 90'	Stadium: KFUM Arena; Attendance: 783; Referee: Ajdin Medic

1 July 2023 14	Jerv	4–3	KFUM Oslo	Grimstad
15:00 CEST (UTC+2)	Brenden (yellow card) 54' (goal) 63'; Pedro (yellow card) 59' (goal) 89' (pen.); Auklend 72'; Philibert 83' (yellow card) 85'	Report	Nuñez 41'; Okeke 52' (yellow card) 61'; Lion Njie (yellow card) 57'; Auklend 66' (o.g.); Nosa Dahl (yellow card) 90'	Stadium: J.J. Ugland Stadion – Levermyr; Attendance: 1,692; Referee: Ole-Alexander Ekeli Valen

8 July 2023 15	Hødd	0–1	KFUM Oslo	Ulsteinvik
15:00 CEST (UTC+2)	Hellevik Larsen (yellow card) 44'; Skeide (yellow card) 70'	Report	Okeke 32'; Akinyemi (yellow card) 71'	Stadium: Høddvoll; Attendance: 948; Referee: Anders Bodding

6 August 2023 16	KFUM Oslo	2–1	Åsane	Oslo
15:00 CEST (UTC+2)	Lysgård 40' (o.g.); Ødegaard (yellow card) 47'; Berg Haltvik 74'	Report	Fredriksen 48' (pen.); Bruun-Hanssen (yellow card) 68'	Stadium: KFUM Arena; Attendance: 854; Referee: Jørgen Haugen

9 August 2023 17	Moss	0–1	KFUM Oslo	Moss
18:00 CEST (UTC+2)	Alexandersson (yellow card) 59'	Report	Svindland (yellow card) 14'; Lange Hjorth 60'; Nuñez (yellow card) 66'; Njie (yellow card) 90+3'	Stadium: Melløs Stadion; Attendance: 1,434; Referee: Mischa Huru Kellerhals

13 August 2023 18	KFUM Oslo	2–1	Fredrikstad	Oslo
17:00 CEST (UTC+2)	Hestnes 41'; Lion Njie (yellow card) 48'; Svindland 59'	Report	Alba 17'; Skaret (yellow card) 33'	Stadium: KFUM Arena; Attendance: 1,548; Referee: Eivind Bodding

19 August 2023 19	Ranheim	4–2	KFUM Oslo	Trondheim
15:00 CEST (UTC+2)	Solli 4'; Tønne 36'; Eggen Rismark 49'; Akinyemi 50' (o.g.); Reginiussen (yellow card) 85'; Amble Haugen (yellow card) 90'	Report	Nuñez 75'; Njie 86'	Stadium: EXTRA Arena; Attendance: 1,177; Referee: Ajdin Medic

23 August 2023 20	KFUM Oslo	0–1	Hødd	Oslo
18:00 CEST (UTC+2)	Sandal (yellow card) 41'	Report	Mogensen 37'; Munkeby Sundnes (yellow card) 68'; Økland (yellow card) 90'; Scriven (yellow card) 90'	Stadium: KFUM Arena; Attendance: 854; Referee: Ali al Hatam

27 August 2023 21	Kongsvinger	1–1	KFUM Oslo	Kongsvinger
17:00 CEST (UTC+2)	Vinjor (yellow card) 50'; Holtan 53' (yellow card) 56'	Report	Rasch 18'	Stadium: Gjemselund Stadion; Attendance: 1,764; Referee: Jan Morten Tennøy

3 September 2023 22	KFUM Oslo	6–2	Jerv	Oslo
15:00 CEST (UTC+2)	Akinyemi 30', 49' (yellow card) 32'; Okeke 46'; Nuñez 55'; Njie (yellow card) 73' (goal) 84', 87'	Report	Pedro 10', 90'; Wichmann (yellow card) 30'	Stadium: KFUM Arena; Attendance: 836; Referee: Juuso Vuorinen

16 September 2023 23	Sandnes Ulf	1–2	KFUM Oslo	Sandnes
15:00 CEST (UTC+2)	Austbø 5'; Hay (yellow card) 38'; Belli Moldskred (yellow card) 53'	Report	Nuñez 39' (pen.); Lange Hjorth (yellow card) 60'; Akinyemi 90+4'	Stadium: Øster Hus Arena; Attendance: 1,396; Referee: Mohammad Hafezi

24 September 2023 24	KFUM Oslo	1–0	Mjøndalen	Oslo
15:00 CEST (UTC+2)	Svindland 58'; Njie (yellow card) 74'	Report	Øverby (yellow card) 39'; Rønning Ovenstad (yellow card) 40'	Stadium: KFUM Arena; Attendance: 874; Referee: Martin Berg

30 September 2023 25	Kristiansund	0–2	KFUM Oslo	Kristiansund
15:00 CEST (UTC+2)	Isaksen (yellow card) 90'	Report	Svindland 36'; Okeke 84'	Stadium: Kristiansund Stadion; Attendance: 3,095; Referee: Steinar Hauge

8 October 2023 26	KFUM Oslo	1–0	Bryne	Oslo
15:00 CEST (UTC+2)	El-Abdellaoui 88'	Report	Sødal (yellow card) 71'	Stadium: KFUM Arena; Attendance: 1,237; Referee: Magnus Nicolai Koløy

22 October 2023 27	KFUM Oslo	0–0	Raufoss	Oslo
15:00 CEST (UTC+2)		Report	Fremstad (yellow card) 22'; Haruna (yellow card) 42'; Emsis (yellow card) 81'	Stadium: KFUM Arena; Attendance: 1,223; Referee: Steinar Hauge

28 October 2023 28	Sogndal	0–3	KFUM Oslo	Sogndalsfjøra
15:00 CEST (UTC+2)		Report	Nuñez 19'; Lange Hjorth (yellow card) 32'; Hestnes 36'; Rasch (yellow card) 82'; Berg Haltvik 89'	Stadium: Fosshaugane Campus; Attendance: 1,526; Referee: Mathias Støfringshaug

5 November 2023 29	KFUM Oslo	1–0	Skeid	Oslo
15:00 CET (UTC+1)	Svindland 67'; Nuñez (yellow card) 82'; Sandal (yellow card) 90'	Report	Tønsberg Andresen (yellow card) 52'; Steiring (yellow card) 90'	Stadium: Intility Arena; Attendance: 2,449; Referee: Mohammad Hafezi
Note: The match was played on Intility Arena due to the KFUM's home stadium KFUM Arena's undergoing renovation.

12 November 2023 30	Start	1–1	KFUM Oslo	Kristiansand
15:00 CET (UTC+1)	Sanyang 42'	Report	Nuñez 28'; Rasch (yellow card) 44'; Berg Haltvik (yellow card) 49'	Stadium: Sør Arena; Attendance: 7,276; Referee: Jan Morten Tennøy

=== Norwegian Football Cup ===
24 May 2023 First round	Hønefoss	1–4	KFUM Oslo	Hønefoss
18:00 CEST (UTC+2)	Muqkurtaj (yellow card) 61' el Amrani 67' (pen.); Nestaker (yellow card) 90'	Report	Rasch 11' (pen.); Sa'Ad 18'; Nuñez 25'; Nosa Dahl 32' (yellow card) 76'; Lassen Harrison (yellow card) 66'	Stadium: Aka Arena; Attendance: 613; Referee: Herman Leiulfsrud Aass

1 June 2023 Second round	Gjelleråsen	1–2	KFUM Oslo	Gjelleråsen
18:00 CEST (UTC+2)	Khris 61'	Report	Helland Hoseth 65'; Hestnes 74'	Stadium: Li kunstgress Referee: Mohammad Hafezi

7 June 2023 Third round	KFUM Oslo	4–2 (a.e.t.)	Åsane	Oslo
17:00 CEST (UTC+2)	Sandal 31', 49'; Akinyemi (yellow card) 63' (yellow-red card) 66'; Lange Hjorth (yellow card) 83'; Nuñez 98' (pen.); Sa'Ad 105' (yellow card) 105'; Okeke (yellow card) 120'	Report	Lotsberg 79'; Myklebust 85'; Sildnes (yellow card) 87'; Østgaard (yellow card) 96'; Austevoll (yellow card) 114'	Stadium: KFUM Arena; Attendance: 721; Referee: Eivind Bodding

28 June 2023 Fourth round	Kjelsås	2–0	KFUM Oslo	Oslo
18:00 CEST (UTC+2)	Aslaksrud 90+2'; Vinge 90+5'	Report		Stadium: Grefsen Stadion; Attendance: 1,303; Referee: Ola Hobber Nilsen
