= 2026 KFUM-Kameratene Oslo season =

KFUM Oslo
2026 season
- Chairman: Christian Harlem
- Manager: Johannes Moesgaard (until 13 May); Jørgen Isnes (from 18 May)
- Stadium: KFUM-Arena
- Eliteserien: 12th
- 2025–26 Norwegian Cup: Semi-finals
- 2026–27 Norwegian Cup: Pre-season
Home colours	Away colours

The 2026 season is the 87th season in the history of KFUM-Kameratene Oslo and the third consecutive season in the Eliteserien. In addition, KFUM-Kameratene Oslo will participate in the 2026–27 Norwegian Football Cup. The team also completed its participation in the 2025–26 Norwegian Football Cup by reaching the semi-finals.

== Transfers ==
=== In ===
Pos.	Player	Transferred from	Fee	Date	Source
FW	(Norway) Mostafa Najafzadeh	(Norway) Vålerenga Fotball Youth		19 November 2025	
MF	(Somalia) Yasir Abdiqadir Sa'Ad	(Norway) Skeid	Loan return	31 December 2025	
DF	(Norway) Mohammed Hopsdal Abbas	(Norway) Strømmen	Loan return	31 December 2025	
DF	(The Gambia) Momodou Lion Njie	(Norway) Sarpsborg 08	Loan return	31 December 2025	
DF	(Norway) Eirik Saunes	(Norway) Bryne		3 January 2026	
GK	(Poland) Krzysztof Bąkowski	(Poland) Lech Poznań	Loan	7 February 2026	
FW	(Norway) Magnus Grødem	(Switzerland) Yverdon-Sport FC		16 February 2026	
MF	(Norway) Magnus Wolff Eikrem	Unattached		16 February 2026	
MF	(Norway) Tore André Sørås	(Norway) Hamarkameratene		18 February 2026	

=== Out ===
Pos.	Player	Transferred to	Fee	Date	Source
MF	(Somalia) Yasir Abdiqadir Sa'Ad	(Norway) Rana FK		31 December 2025	
FW	(Senegal) Mame Mor Ndiaye	(China) Foshan Nanshi		31 December 2025	
FW	(Norway) Henrik Udahl	(Norway) Hamarkameratene	Loan return	31 December 2025	
DF	(Norway) Mathias Tønnessen	(Norway) Tromsø	NOK 13 million	2 January 2026	
MF	(Norway) Sverre Sandal	(England) Luton Town	~NOK 15 million	2 February 2026	
FW	(Norway) Sondre Spieler Halvorsen	(Norway) Tromsdalen		2 February 2026	
GK	(Norway) William Da Rocha	(Norway) Kongsvinger	Undisclosed	10 February 2026	
DF	(Norway) Mohammed Hopsdal Abbas	(Norway) Eik Tønsberg		2 March 2025	

== Pre-season and friendlies ==
31 January 2026 Friendly	KFUM Oslo (Norway)	1–1	(Norway) Skeid

7 February 2026 Friendly	Lillestrøm (Norway)	7–2	(Norway) KFUM Oslo

13 February 2026 Friendly	KFUM Oslo (Norway)	1–1	(Norway) Kongsvinger

17 February 2026 Friendly	Fredrikstad (Norway)	1–1	(Norway) KFUM Oslo

21 February 2026 Friendly	Vålerenga (Norway)	1–0	(Norway) KFUM Oslo

28 February 2026 Friendly	Strømsgodset (Norway)	0–3	(Norway) KFUM Oslo

21 June 2026 Friendly	Molde (Norway)	5–1	(Norway) KFUM Oslo	Molde
18:00				Stadium: Aker Stadion

4 July 2026 Friendly	Vendsyssel (Denmark)	2–0	(Norway) KFUM Oslo	Denmark
14:00	44'; 59'

== Competitions ==
=== Overall record ===
Competition	First match	Last match	Starting round	Final position	Record							
Competition	First match	Last match	Starting round	Final position	Pld	W	D	L	GF	GA	GD	Win %
Eliteserien	15 March 2026		Matchday 1		11	3	3	5	12	17	−5	27.27
2025–26 Norwegian Football Cup	7 March 2026	22 April 2026	Fourth round	Semi-finals	3	2	0	1	6	5	+1	66.67
2026–27 Norwegian Football Cup					0	0	0	0	0	0	+0	—
Total					14	5	3	6	18	22	−4	35.71

Last updated: 29 May 2026
Source: Competitions

=== Eliteserien ===
Pos	Team	Pld	W	D	L	GF	GA	GD	Pts	Qualification or relegation
10	Fredrikstad	11	4	2	5	15	20	−5	14	
11	Brann	12	4	1	7	24	20	+4	13	
12	KFUM	11	3	3	5	12	17	−5	12	
13	Aalesund	11	2	5	4	15	20	−5	11	
14	Kristiansund	11	3	2	6	11	18	−7	11	Qualification for the relegation play-offs

Updated to match(es) played on 30 May 2026. Source: Football Association of Norway (in Norwegian)
Rules for classification: 1) Points; 2) Goal difference; 3) Goals scored; 4) Head-to-head points; 5) Head-to-head goal difference; 6) Head-to-head goals scored.

==== Results summary ====
Overall								Home						Away					
Pld	W	D	L	GF	GA	GD	Pts	W	D	L	GF	GA	GD	W	D	L	GF	GA	GD
11	3	3	5	12	17	−5	12	3	1	2	6	4	+2	0	2	3	6	13	−7

Last updated: 29 May 2026.

==== Results by round ====
Round	1	2	3	4	5	6	7	8	9	10	11
Ground	H	A	H	A	A	H	A	H	A	H	H
Result	W	L	L	D	L	W	D	L	L	W	D
Position											

Updated to match(es) played on 29 May 2026. Source:
A = Away; H = Home; W = Win; D = Draw; L = Loss

==== Matches ====
The match schedule was issued on 19 December 2025.

15 March 2026 1	KFUM Oslo	2–0	Start	Oslo
				Stadium: KFUM-Arena

22 March 2026 2	Fredrikstad	3–1	KFUM Oslo

7 April 2026 3	KFUM Oslo	1–2	Sandefjord	Oslo
				Stadium: KFUM-Arena

12 April 2026 4	Aalesund	2–2	KFUM Oslo

19 April 2026 5	HamKam	4–0	KFUM Oslo

26 April 2026 6	KFUM Oslo	1–0	Sarpsborg 08	Oslo
				Stadium: KFUM-Arena

3 May 2026 7	Vålerenga	2–2	KFUM Oslo

10 May 2026 8	KFUM Oslo	0–2	Viking	Oslo
				Stadium: KFUM-Arena

16 May 2026 9	Brann	2–1	KFUM Oslo

25 May 2026 10	KFUM Oslo	2–0	Rosenborg	Oslo
				Stadium: KFUM-Arena

29 May 2026 11	KFUM Oslo	0–0	Tromsø	Oslo
19:00				Stadium: KFUM-Arena; Referee: Sigurd Smehus Kringstad

=== Norwegian Football Cup ===
==== 2025–26 ====
7 March 2026 Fourth round	KFUM Oslo	2–1	Tromsø

19 March 2026 Quarter-finals	KFUM Oslo	3–2	Fredrikstad

22 April 2026 Semi-finals	Bodø/Glimt	2–1 (a.e.t.)	KFUM Oslo

==== 2026–27 ====
22–23 August 2026 First round	Ready	v	KFUM Oslo
