= Sverre Sandal =

Norwegian footballer (born 2002)

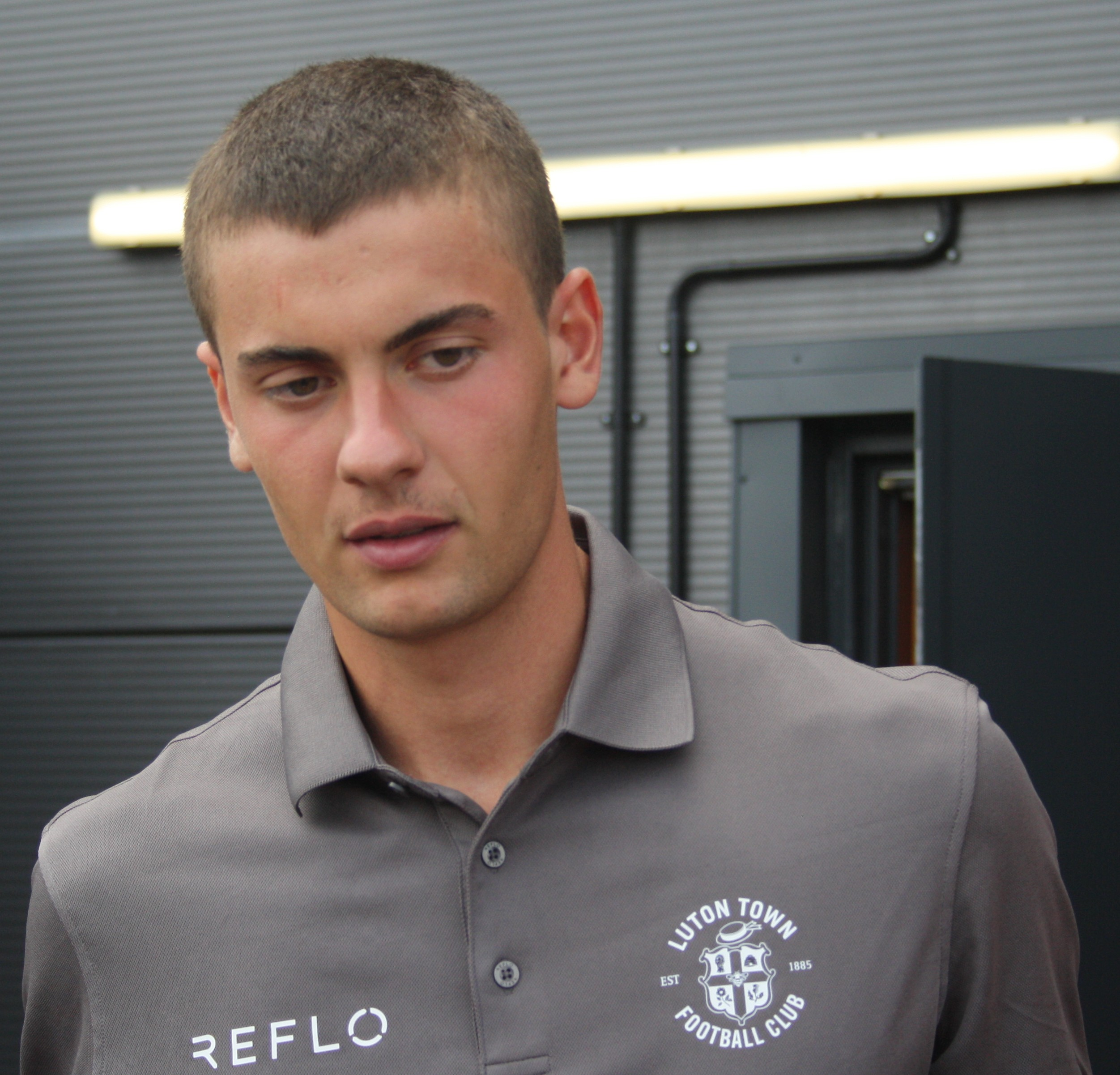
- Sandal in 2026 with Luton Town

Personal information
- Full name: Sverre Hakami Sandal
- Date of birth: 6 June 2003 (age 23)
- Place of birth: Oslo, Norway
- Height: 1.93 m (6 ft 4 in)
- Position: Midfielder

Team information
- Current team: Luton Town
- Number: 4

Youth career
- –2016: Hauketo
- 2017–2021: Nordstrand

Senior career*
Years	Team	Apps	(Gls)
2021	Nordstrand	11	(1)
2022–2024	KFUM II	12	(3)
2022	→ Nordstrand (loan)	19	(2)
2023–2026	KFUM	81	(5)
2026–	Luton Town	3	(0)
- * Club domestic league appearances and goals as of 11:53, 6 May 2026 (UTC)

Sverre Hakami Sandal (born 6 June 2003) is a Norwegian footballer who plays as a midfielder for EFL League One club Luton Town.

== Career ==
=== Early life ===
Sandal was born in Oslo in 2003 to an English mother and a Norwegian father. He started his footballing career in the youth system at Hauketo, before joining Nordstrand in 2017.

=== Nordstrand ===
Sandal was taken into the Nordstrand first-team squad in 2021.

In February 2022, Sandal joined KFUM, who would immediately loan him back to Nordstrand. He left the club at the end of his loan.

=== KFUM ===
In the 2023 season, Sandal helped KFUM in their promotion to the Eliteserien, playing all but one game.

In the 2024 season, he developed into an important player for the club, again featuring in most of the club's top-flight matches that season.

Ahead of the 2025 season, TV 2 Direkte praised Sandal's performances, describing him as "Ekeberg's Yaya Touré". He left the club at the end of the season.

=== Luton Town ===
In February 2026, Sandal signed for EFL League One club Luton Town in a deadline day deal. Due to the differing schedules of Norwegian and English football, he made only three substitute appearances for the club in the 2025–26 season as he did not have a pre-season to build up fitness.

Sandal was sidelined for the majority of the following 2026–27 season following a knee injury requiring surgery.

== Career statistics ==
As of match played 8 August 2026

Appearances and goals by club, season and competition
Club	Season	League			National Cup (Note: Includes Norwegian Football Cup and FA Cup)		League Cup (Note: Includes EFL Cup)		Other		Total	
Club	Season	Division	Apps	Goals	Apps	Goals	Apps	Goals	Apps	Goals	Apps	Goals
Nordstrand	2021	3. divisjon	11	1	1	0	–		–		12	1
KFUM II	2022	3. divisjon	0	0	0	0	–		–		0	0
KFUM II	2023	3. divisjon	6	2	0	0	–		–		6	2
KFUM II	2024	3. divisjon	6	1	0	0	–		–		6	1
KFUM II	Total		12	3	0	0	–		–		12	3
Nordstrand (loan)	2022	3. divisjon	19	2	1	0	–		–		20	2
KFUM	2023	1. divisjon	29	2	4	2	–		–		33	4
KFUM	2024	Eliteserien	26	0	6	0	–		–		32	0
KFUM	2025	Eliteserien	26	3	5	0	–		–		31	3
KFUM	Total		81	5	15	2	–		–		96	7
Luton Town	2025–26	League One	3	0	–		–		0	0	3	0
Luton Town	2026–27	League One	0	0	0	0	1	0	0	0	1	0
Luton Town	Total		3	0	0	0	1	0	0	0	4	0
Career total			126	11	17	2	0	0	0	0	143	13
