= Haltvik =

Haltvik is a Norwegian surname. Notable people with the surname include:

- Katinka Haltvik (born 1991), Norwegian handball player
- Teodor Berg Haltvik (born 2000), Norwegian footballer
- Trine Haltvik (born 1965), Norwegian handball coach and former player
