= 2019 Norwegian Second Division =

2. divisjon
- Season: 2019
- Champions: Stjørdals-Blink (Group 1); Grorud (Group 2)
- Promoted: Stjørdals-Blink; Grorud; Åsane
- Relegated: Vidar; Sola; Byåsen; Elverum; Oppsal; Mjølner
- Matches played: 364
- Goals scored: 1,173 (3.22 per match)
- Top goalscorer: Gr. 1: Markus Naglestad (25 goals); Gr. 2: Håkon Lorentzen (14 goals)

The 2019 2. divisjon (referred to as PostNord-ligaen for sponsorship reasons) was a Norwegian football third-tier league season. The league consisted of 28 teams divided into 2 groups of 14 teams.

The league was played as a double round-robin tournament, where all teams played 26 matches. The season began on 13 April and concluded on 26 October.

== Team changes ==
The following teams changed division since the 2018 season.

Locations of the 2019 2. divisjon teams.
Green: Group 1; Red: Group 2.

=== To 2. divisjon ===
Promoted from 3. divisjon

- Oppsal
- Kvik Halden
- Sola
- Sotra
- Byåsen
- Senja

Relegated from 1. divisjon

- Åsane
- Florø
- Levanger

=== From 2. divisjon ===
Promoted to 1. divisjon

- Raufoss
- Skeid
- KFUM Oslo

Relegated to 3. divisjon

- Nybergsund
- Hønefoss
- Stabæk 2
- Fløy
- Vålerenga 2
- Vard Haugesund

== League tables ==
=== Group 1 ===
Pos	Team	Pld	W	D	L	GF	GA	GD	Pts	Promotion, qualification or relegation
1	Stjørdals-Blink (C, P)	26	18	6	2	69	22	+47	60	Promotion to First Division
2	Kvik Halden	26	18	4	4	57	26	+31	58	Qualification for promotion play-offs
3	Fredrikstad	26	16	5	5	52	28	+24	53	
4	Egersund	26	13	6	7	60	36	+24	45	
5	Levanger	26	13	2	11	38	40	−2	41	
6	Arendal	26	12	3	11	49	40	+9	39	
7	Hødd	26	10	5	11	40	45	−5	35	
8	Moss	26	10	4	12	35	46	−11	34	
9	Brattvåg	26	9	6	11	43	50	−7	33	
10	Bryne	26	7	7	12	30	41	−11	28	
11	Nardo	26	8	5	13	27	43	−16	27 (Note: Nardo have been deducted 2 points due to financial difficulties.)	
12	Vidar (R)	26	5	6	15	32	51	−19	21	Relegation to Third Division
13	Sola (R)	26	6	2	18	32	61	−29	20	Relegation to Third Division
14	Byåsen (R)	26	4	5	17	28	63	−35	17	Relegation to Third Division

Source: nifs.no (in Norwegian)
Rules for classification: 1) Points; 2) Goal difference; 3) Goals scored; 4) Head-to-head points; 5) Head-to-head goal difference; 6) Head-to-head away goals scored (only if between two teams); 7) Head-to-head goals scored; 8) Play-off (only used to decide champions or relegation).
(C) Champions; (P) Promoted; (R) Relegated

=== Group 2 ===
Pos	Team	Pld	W	D	L	GF	GA	GD	Pts	Promotion, qualification or relegation
1	Grorud (C, P)	26	15	6	5	47	32	+15	51	Promotion to First Division
2	Åsane (O, P)	26	15	5	6	66	31	+35	50	Qualification for promotion play-offs
3	Kjelsås	26	13	8	5	50	30	+20	47	
4	Asker	26	13	7	6	39	28	+11	46	
5	Fram Larvik	26	12	7	7	50	34	+16	43	
6	Alta	26	12	5	9	44	41	+3	41	
7	Florø	26	9	8	9	36	41	−5	35	
8	Odd 2	26	10	2	14	46	45	+1	32	
9	Sotra	26	8	6	12	34	37	−3	30	
10	Bærum	26	7	8	11	39	55	−16	29	
11	Senja	26	7	6	13	31	47	−16	27	
12	Elverum (R)	26	7	5	14	34	46	−12	26	Relegation to Third Division
13	Oppsal (R)	26	6	6	14	35	60	−25	24	Relegation to Third Division
14	Mjølner (R)	26	6	5	15	30	54	−24	23	Relegation to Third Division

Source: nifs.no (in Norwegian)
Rules for classification: 1) Points; 2) Goal difference; 3) Goals scored; 4) Head-to-head points; 5) Head-to-head goal difference; 6) Head-to-head away goals scored (only if between two teams); 7) Head-to-head goals scored; 8) Play-off (only used to decide champions or relegation).
(C) Champions; (O) Play-off winners; (P) Promoted; (R) Relegated

== Promotion play-offs ==
The teams who finished in second place in their respective group qualified for the promotion play-offs, where they faced each other over two legs. The winner, Åsane, then played against the 14th placed team in 1. divisjon for a place in the 2020 1. divisjon.

2 November 2019
14:00 CET (UTC+1)

Åsane	2–0	Kvik Halden
Fredriksen 63'; Stava 75'	Report

Myrdal Stadion, Bergen
Attendance: 305
Referee: Daniel Higraff
9 November 2019
13:00 CET (UTC+1)

Kvik Halden	1–2	Åsane
Krans 48'	Report	Hammersland 5', 74'

Halden Stadion, Halden
Attendance: 633
Referee: Marius Lien

Åsane won 4–1 on aggregate.

== Top scorers ==
=== Group 1 ===
Rank	Player	Club	Goals
1	(Norway) Markus Naglestad	Egersund	25
2	(Norway) Mats Lillebo	Stjørdals-Blink	23
3	(Norway) Tim Nilsen	Fredrikstad	15
3	(Norway) Sondre Hopmark Stokke	Stjørdals-Blink	15
5	(The Gambia) Bubacarr Sumareh	Egersund	14
6	(Norway) Youssef Chaib	Kvik Halden	13
6	(Denmark) Sami Kamel	Brattvåg	13
8	(Norway) Thomas Klemetsen Jakobsen	Vidar	12
8	(Norway) Henrik Kjelsrud Johansen	Fredrikstad	12
8	(Norway) Håkon Bjørdal Leine	Brattvåg	12

=== Group 2 ===
Rank	Player	Club	Goals
1	(Norway) Håkon Lorentzen	Åsane	14
2	(Norway) Joakim Vatle Hammersland	Åsane	13
2	(Norway) Walid Chafouk Idrissi	Kjelsås	13
2	(Norway) Magnus Solum	Elverum	13
5	(Norway) Thierry Dabove	Grorud	11
5	(Norway) Tobias Lauritsen	Odd 2	11
5	(Senegal) Mame Mor Ndiaye	Fram Larvik	11
5	(Netherlands) Guyon Philips	Alta	11
5	(Norway) Jone Rugland	Sotra/Fram Larvik	11
10	(Denmark) Lorent Callaku	Florø	10
10	(Norway) Oliver Valaker Edvardsen	Grorud	10
10	(Norway) Wilhelm Osman Veum-Adra	Oppsal	10
