= Krzysztof Bąkowski =

Polish footballer

Personal information
- Full name: Krzysztof Maciej Bąkowski
- Date of birth: 4 January 2003 (age 23)
- Place of birth: Poznań, Poland
- Height: 1.90 m (6 ft 3 in)
- Position: Goalkeeper

Team information
- Current team: Chrobry Głogów
- Number: 22

Youth career
- –2011: Suchary Suchy Las
- 2011–2013: Warta Poznań
- 2013–2019: Lech Poznań

Senior career*
Years	Team	Apps	(Gls)
2019–2026	Lech Poznań II	48	(0)
2019–2026	Lech Poznań	0	(0)
2021–2022	→ Stomil Olsztyn (loan)	16	(0)
2023	→ Stal Rzeszów (loan)	14	(0)
2023	→ Radomiak Radom (loan)	1	(0)
2024	→ Polonia Warsaw (loan)	3	(0)
2024–2025	→ Stal Rzeszów (loan)	30	(0)
2026	→ KFUM (loan)	2	(0)
2026–	Chrobry Głogów	0	(0)

International career
2017–2018	Poland U15	6	(0)
2018–2019	Poland U16	5	(0)
2019–2020	Poland U17	10	(0)
2021	Poland U19	2	(0)
2022–2023	Poland U21	3	(0)
- * Club domestic league appearances and goals as of 18:56, 1 June 2026 (UTC)

Krzysztof Maciej Bąkowski (born 4 January 2003) is a Polish professional footballer who plays as a goalkeeper for I liga club Chrobry Głogów.

== Career statistics ==
As of match played 22 March 2026

Appearances and goals by club, season and competition
Club	Season	League			National cup (Note: Includes Polish Cup, Norwegian Cup)		Continental		Other		Total	
Club	Season	Division	Apps	Goals	Apps	Goals	Apps	Goals	Apps	Goals	Apps	Goals
Lech Poznań II	2020–21	II liga	31	0	2	0	—		—		33	0
Lech Poznań II	2022–23	II liga	13	0	0	0	—		—		13	0
Lech Poznań II	2025–26	III liga, group II	4	0	—		—		—		4	0
Lech Poznań II	Total		48	0	2	0	—		—		50	0
Stomil Olsztyn (loan)	2021–22	I liga	16	0	1	0	—		—		17	0
Stal Rzeszów (loan)	2022–23	I liga	13	0	—		—		1 (Note: Appearance in I liga promotion play-offs)	0	14	0
Radomiak Radom (loan)	2023–24	Ekstraklasa	1	0	1	0	—		—		2	0
Polonia Warsaw (loan)	2023–24	I liga	3	0	—		—		—		3	0
Stal Rzeszów (loan)	2024–25	I liga	30	0	0	0	—		—		30	0
KFUM (loan)	2026	Eliteserien	2	0	1	0	—		—		3	0
Chrobry Głogów	2026–27	I liga	0	0	0	0	—		—		0	0
Career total			113	0	5	0	—		1	0	119	0
