= Teodor Berg Haltvik =

Norwegian footballer (born 1999)

Personal information
- Date of birth: 9 April 2000 (age 26)
- Place of birth: Trondheim, Norway
- Height: 1.82 m (6 ft 0 in)
- Position: Forward

Team information
- Current team: Sønderjyske
- Number: 14

Youth career
- –2014: Strindheim
- 2015–2016: Rosenborg

Senior career*
Years	Team	Apps	(Gls)
2017–2020	Rosenborg 2	75	(30)
2021–2022	Raufoss	50	(4)
2023–2026	KFUM	73	(9)
2026–	Sønderjyske	1	(0)
- * Club domestic league appearances and goals as of 6 August 2026

Teodor Berg Haltvik (born 9 April 2000) is a Norwegian footballer who plays as a forward for Sønderjyske.

== Career ==
He started his youth career in Strindheim IL and then Rosenborg. For the latter team he won the 2019 Norwegian U20 Cup. Ahead of the 2020 season he trained with Hamarkameratene.

Ahead of the 2021 season he transferred from Rosenborg's B team to First Division team Raufoss IL. He was nominated for the Breakthrough of the Year Award in the 2021 1. divisjon.

The first time he played against Rosenborg, he scored as Raufoss won a friendly match.

In January 2023 he moved on to league rivals KFUM. KFUM won promotion, and Haltvik made his Eliteserien debut in 2024.

On 30 July 2026, Haltvik joined Danish Superliga side Sønderjyske on a three-year contract.

== Career statistics ==
As of 6 August 2026

Appearances and goals by club, season and competition
Club	Season	Division	League		Cup		Continental		Total	
Club	Season	Division	Apps	Goals	Apps	Goals	Apps	Goals	Apps	Goals
Rosenborg 2	2017	3. divisjon	19	6	0	0	—		19	6
Rosenborg 2	2018	3. divisjon	17	2	0	0	—		17	2
Rosenborg 2	2019	3. divisjon	26	19	0	0	—		26	19
Rosenborg 2	2020	2. divisjon	13	3	0	0	—		13	4
Rosenborg 2	Total		75	30	0	0	—		75	30
Raufoss	2021	OBOS-ligaen	26	2	3	0	—		29	2
Raufoss	2022	OBOS-ligaen	24	2	1	0	—		25	2
Raufoss	Total		50	4	4	0	—		54	4
KFUM	2023	OBOS-ligaen	12	3	3	0	—		15	3
KFUM	2024	Eliteserien	25	0	6	1	—		31	1
KFUM	2025	Eliteserien	26	2	6	0	—		32	2
KFUM	2026	Eliteserien	10	4	2	2	—		12	6
KFUM	Total		73	9	17	3	—		90	12
Sønderjyske	2026–27	Danish Superliga	1	0	0	0	—		1	0
Career total			199	43	21	3	—		220	46

== Personal life ==
He is a nephew of handball player Trine Haltvik.
