= FK Senja =

Norwegian football club

- Full name: Fotballklubben Senja
- Founded: 1949 (Silsand OIL)
- Ground: Senja Stadion
- Coach: Jan Tore Bakli
- League: 4. divisjon
- 2022: 3. divisjon group 6, 14th of 14 (relegated)
Home colours	Away colours

Fotballklubben Senja is a Norwegian association football club from Silsand, Troms.

The men's team currently plays in the Norwegian Fourth Division, having been relegated from the 2022 Norwegian Third Division.

== Recent history ==
In 2026 They won at home VS Skarp in the 4th division and they won 3-0 and Skarp's number 15 got a red card for bringing senja's number 7 to make a penalty and Sondre Konstatin Urås rolled it past the keeper down the midel and they won 16-0 vs Nordresia at home and sondre Konstatin Urås scored 9 times and got man of the match.
Skarp leads the 4th division and senja is at 3rd place.
And FK senja have a Black 3rd kit for when white or blue cant be used

Season		Pos.	Pl.	W	D	L	GS	GA	P	Cup	Notes
2007	3. divisjon	↑ 1	22	17	3	2	100	33	54	First round	Promoted
2008	2. divisjon	↓ 12	26	6	2	18	36	92	20	First round	Relegated
2009	3. divisjon	↑ 1	22	19	2	1	103	28	59	First round	Promoted
2010	2. divisjon	8	26	10	5	11	48	52	35	Second round	
2011	2. divisjon	5	26	14	2	10	57	66	44	Second round	
2012	2. divisjon	3	26	15	5	6	54	44	50	First round	
2013	2. divisjon	↓ 14	26	6	2	18	41	58	20	First round	Relegated
2014	3. divisjon	↑ 1	22	17	4	1	75	16	55	First round	Promoted
2015	2. divisjon	10	26	9	3	14	48	59	30	Third round	
2016	2. divisjon	↓ 9	26	7	8	11	34	41	29	Second round	Relegated
2017	3. divisjon	2	26	17	0	9	63	33	51	First round	
2018	3. divisjon	↑ 1	26	18	4	4	63	23	58	Second round	Promoted
2019	2. divisjon	11	26	7	6	13	31	47	27	First round	
2020	2. divisjon	13	13	2	3	8	13	33	8	Cancelled	
2021	2. divisjon	↓ 14	26	2	5	19	22	65	11	Second round	Relegated
2022	3. divisjon	↓ 14	26	5	4	17	33	80	19	First round	Relegated
2026	4. divisjon	3	43	15	1	6	80	20	43		
