= Remi-André Svindland =

Norwegian footballer (born 1997)

Personal information
- Date of birth: 29 October 1997 (age 29)
- Place of birth: Elverum, Norway
- Height: 1.78 m (5 ft 10 in)
- Position: Central midfielder

Team information
- Current team: Bryne
- Number: 6

Youth career
- Elverum

Senior career*
Years	Team	Apps	(Gls)
2013–2018	Elverum	78	(11)
2018–2020	Moss	48	(2)
2020–2025	KFUM	133	(13)
2025–	Bryne	2	(0)
- * Club domestic league appearances and goals as of 15 April 2026

Remi-André Svindland (born 29 October 1997) is a Norwegian footballer who plays as a midfielder for Bryne FK.

== Career ==
Born and raised in Elverum, he started playing youth football in Elverum IL, where he made his senior debut in the 2013 1. divisjon. Following Elverum's relegation, they returned to the second tier in 2017. The following season, he moved to Moss FK, having also been considered by Fredrikstad FK.

In 2020 he moved on to KFUM. He achieved a special mention in the club history when he scored the goal that secured KFUM's promotion to the 2024 Eliteserien, the club's first-ever appearance on that level. He made his Eliteserien debut in April 2024 against Hamkam.

In 2025 he left KFUM for another newly promoted Eliteserien team, Bryne FK. Already in his second training, he suffered an injury. As a result, he did not play a single competitive match in 2025. When he played a full match in 2026, it was 532 minutes since last time.
