= David Hickson Gyedu =

Norwegian footballer (born 1997)

David Hickson
Personal information
- Full name: David Hickson Gyedu
- Date of birth: 9 July 1997 (age 29)
- Position: Left back

Team information
- Current team: KFUM
- Number: 42

Youth career
- Vestli
- Årvoll
- Skeid
- 2013: Gjelleråsen
- 2014: Lyn
- 2016: Vålerenga

Senior career*
Years	Team	Apps	(Gls)
2015	Lyn	15	(3)
2016	Vålerenga 2	15	(2)
2017–2023	Skeid	125	(10)
2024–	KFUM	62	(5)
- * Club domestic league appearances and goals as of 23 July 2026

David Hickson Gyedu (born 9 July 1997) is a Norwegian football defender who plays as a left back or wing back for KFUM.

Hickson hails from Stovner borough. He started his career in Vestli IL, before moving southward in the Groruddalen valley to play for Årvoll IL and then Skeid as a teenager. He was eventually rejected in Skeid, and played for Gjelleråsen at the age of 16, then Lyn from the west end of Oslo. He also made his senior debut for Lyn in the 2015 2. divisjon. After Lyn was relegated, Hickson tried his luck for Vålerenga before returning to Skeid in 2017.

Hickson made his breakthrough in Skeid in the curtailed 2020 2. divisjon season. Skeid bounced up and down between the 1. divisjon and 2. divisjon. Being relegated in 2018, the team returned in 2022 and managed to survive relegation. In 2023 Hickson scored a "perfect volley" in the league opener, but his contract was due to expire. Skeid was relegated from the 2023 1. divisjon, and so Hickson trained with Eliteserien team Hamarkameratene in January 2024. Later that same month, he signed for the Oslo-based Eliteserien team KFUM. He scored his first KFUM goals in the 2024 cup against Frigg.
