= Erik Jonvik =

Norwegian footballer (born 1990)

Personal information
- Full name: Erik Lundanes Jonvik
- Date of birth: 29 December 1990 (age 35)
- Position: Midfielder

Team information
- Current team: Kvik Halden

Youth career
- Berg IL

Senior career*
| Years | Team | Apps | (Gls) |
| 2008–2010 | KFUM Oslo | | |
| 2011–2012 | Sarpsborg 08 | | |
| 2013– | KFUM Oslo | | |
- * Club domestic league appearances and goals as of 30 August 2015

Erik Jonvik (born 29 December 1990) is a Norwegian footballer who is playing as a midfielder for KFUM Oslo.

He had a stint for Sarpsborg 08, joining them after the 2010 season. The team then made its debut on the first tier, with Jonvik appearing 21 times. They were relegated, and after one season with Sarpsborg 08 in the Norwegian First Division he returned to KFUM in 2013.

Jonvik has also appeared for the national futsal team, scoring a goal in their first official match, a 2–1 win against Ireland.
