= Isaiah Skovsgaard =

Norwegian footballer (born 2011

Personal information
- Full name: Isaiah Zion Kabi Skovsgaard
- Date of birth: 23 January 2011 (age 15)
- Position: Striker

Team information
- Current team: KFUM Oslo
- Number: 29

Youth career
- –2024: Frigg
- 2025: Vålerenga

Senior career*
Years	Team	Apps	(Gls)
2026–	KFUM Oslo	2	(0)
- * Club domestic league appearances and goals as of 21 November 2026

Isaiah Zion Kabi Skovsgaard (born 23 January 2011) is a Norwegian professional footballer who plays as a striker for Eliteserien club KFUM Oslo.

== Club career ==
Skovsgaard made the move to KFUM Oslo in January 2026, having previously played for the academies of Frigg and Eliteserien rivals Vålerenga. On 15 August 2026 he made his professional debut as a substitute for Rasmus Eggen Vinge, delivering an assist in his eleven minutes on the pitch against Lillestrøm SK. He became the youngest KFUM Oslo debutant ever, and drew comparisons with Norwegian striker legend John Carew from head coach Jörgen Isnes.
