= Obilor Okeke =

Norwegian footballer (born 2002)

Personal information
- Full name: Obilor Denzel Okeke
- Date of birth: 23 July 2002 (age 24)
- Place of birth: Oslo, Norway
- Height: 1.70 m (5 ft 7 in)
- Position: Winger

Team information
- Current team: Brommapojkarna
- Number: 7

Youth career
- –2014: Bærumsløkka
- 2015: Oppsal
- 2016: Stabæk
- 2017–2018: Vålerenga
- 2019–2020: Skeid

Senior career*
Years	Team	Apps	(Gls)
2020	Skeid	1	(0)
2021	Asker	25	(8)
2022	Fredrikstad	23	(1)
2023–2025	KFUM	53	(12)
2025–2026	Hammarby IF	9	(0)
2026–	Brommapojkarna	3	(0)

International career^{‡}
2021	Norway U19	2	(0)
2023	Norway U21	2	(0)
- * Club domestic league appearances and goals as of 7 July 2026 ‡ National team caps and goals as of 24 March 2025

Obilor Denzel Okeke (born 23 July 2002) is a Norwegian footballer who plays as a winger for Allsvenskan club Brommapojkarna.

== Career ==
He played youth football for several clubs, including Bærumsløkka, Oppsal and Stabæk, before spending two seasons in Vålerenga and two in Skeid. Having barely made his senior debut in Skeid, he broke through in 2021 when he played for 2. divisjon team Asker. He was on trial with Viking FK before the start of the season, and ended up signing for 1. divisjon team Fredrikstad FK.

His start in Fredrikstad was slow, with only three substitutions during his first few months at the club. Altogether, he started 6 matches, compared to 17 where he came in as a substitute.

After one season in Fredrikstad, he instead joined KFUM Oslo. In the 2023 1. divisjon, Okeke won promotion to Eliteserien with KFUM and was awarded as the league's Young Player of the Year. In the start of 2024, Okeke struggled with hives which made training painful—and also took a mental toll on the player. He finally made his Eliteserien debut in late June, three months into the season. He scored his first Eliteserien goal in October against Sandefjord. He then played the 2024 Norwegian Football Cup final which KFUM lost. The 2025 Eliteserien saw Okeke score more often.

== Personal life ==
Of Nigerian descent, Obilor Okeke is a son of sprinter Aham Okeke. He is nicknamed Obi. His favourite team is Chelsea.

== Honours ==
Individual

- Norwegian First Division Young Player of the Year: 2023
