= 2020 Norwegian Second Division =

2. divisjon
- Season: 2020
- Dates: 10 July 2020 – 12 December 2020
- Champions: Fredrikstad (Group 1); Bryne (Group 2)
- Promoted: Fredrikstad; Bryne
- Matches played: 219
- Goals scored: 722 (3.3 per match)
- Top goalscorer: Gr. 1: Johnny Buduson (15 goals); Gr. 2: Joacim Holtan (15 goals)

The 2020 2. divisjon (referred to as PostNord-ligaen for sponsorship reasons) was a Norwegian football third-tier league season. The league consisted of 28 teams divided into 2 groups of 14 teams. The groups were announced by the NFF on 7 December 2019.

Under normal circumstances, the league would have been played as a double round-robin tournament, where all teams play 26 matches. However, this season, due to the COVID-19 pandemic, the league was split after 13 rounds, meaning the teams only played each other once in this stage. The seven best ranked teams in each of the two groups qualified for a second stage, the promotion groups, where they were to play six more matches. The seven worst ranked teams in each of the two groups did not play any more matches after the first stage, and no teams were relegated.

On 12 November, four of the last six matches in group 1 were cancelled because the teams had nothing left to play for. The two teams finishing in first and second place had already been determined. One match was also cancelled in group 2 for the same reason.

== Team changes ==
The following teams changed division since the 2019 season.

Locations of the 2020 2. divisjon teams.
Green: Group 1; Red: Group 2.

=== To 2. divisjon ===
Promoted from 3. divisjon

- Eidsvold Turn
- Vålerenga 2
- Fløy-Flekkerøy
- Vard Haugesund
- Rosenborg 2
- Fløya

Relegated from 1. divisjon

- Notodden
- Skeid
- Tromsdalen

=== From 2. divisjon ===
Promoted to 1. divisjon

- Stjørdals-Blink
- Grorud
- Åsane

Relegated to 3. divisjon

- Vidar
- Sola
- Byåsen
- Elverum
- Oppsal
- Mjølner

== League tables ==
=== Group 1 ===
Pos	Team	Pld	W	D	L	GF	GA	GD	Pts	Promotion, qualification or relegation
1	Fredrikstad	13	13	0	0	45	12	+33	39	Qualification for promotion group 1
2	Hødd	13	8	2	3	21	7	+14	26	Qualification for promotion group 1
3	Skeid	13	8	1	4	29	17	+12	25	Qualification for promotion group 1
4	Kvik Halden	13	8	1	4	29	20	+9	25	Qualification for promotion group 1
5	Alta	13	8	1	4	25	17	+8	25	Qualification for promotion group 1
6	Brattvåg	13	5	4	4	26	17	+9	19	Qualification for promotion group 1
7	Tromsdalen	13	5	3	5	26	17	+9	18	Qualification for promotion group 1
8	Vålerenga 2	13	5	2	6	14	29	−15	17	
9	Eidsvold Turn	13	5	1	7	25	33	−8	16	
10	Florø	13	4	2	7	26	25	+1	14	
11	Kjelsås	13	3	5	5	21	21	0	14	
12	Moss	13	3	2	8	16	24	−8	11	
13	Senja	13	2	3	8	13	33	−20	8 (Note: Senja have been deducted 1 point.)	
14	Fløya	13	0	1	12	10	54	−44	1	

Source: fotball.no (in Norwegian)
Rules for classification: 1) Points; 2) Goal difference; 3) Goals scored; 4) Head-to-head points; 5) Head-to-head goal difference; 6) Head-to-head away goals scored (only if between two teams); 7) Head-to-head goals scored; 8) Play-off (only used to decide champions or relegation).

==== Promotion group 1 ====
Pos	Team	Pld	W	D	L	GF	GA	GD	Pts	Promotion, qualification or relegation
1	Fredrikstad (C, P)	19	17	1	1	60	19	+41	52	Promotion to First Division
2	Skeid	19	12	2	5	36	21	+15	38	Qualification for the promotion play-offs
3	Hødd	17	9	3	5	28	14	+14	30	
4	Alta	17	9	2	6	33	26	+7	29	
5	Kvik Halden	17	9	2	6	37	31	+6	29	
6	Brattvåg	18	6	6	6	32	28	+4	24	
7	Tromsdalen	18	6	4	8	31	24	+7	22	

Source: nifs.no (in Norwegian)
Rules for classification: 1) Points; 2) Goal difference; 3) Goals scored; 4) Head-to-head points; 5) Head-to-head goal difference; 6) Head-to-head away goals scored (only if between two teams); 7) Head-to-head goals scored; 8) Play-off (only used to decide champions or relegation).
(C) Champions; (P) Promoted

=== Group 2 ===
Pos	Team	Pld	W	D	L	GF	GA	GD	Pts	Promotion, qualification or relegation
1	Bryne	13	9	3	1	33	16	+17	30	Qualification for promotion group 2
2	Vard Haugesund	13	9	1	3	29	10	+19	28	Qualification for promotion group 2
3	Egersund	13	7	2	4	34	15	+19	23	Qualification for promotion group 2
4	Asker	13	6	5	2	21	15	+6	23	Qualification for promotion group 2
5	Arendal	13	6	3	4	22	10	+12	21	Qualification for promotion group 2
6	Fløy-Flekkerøy	13	6	3	4	18	13	+5	21	Qualification for promotion group 2
7	Sotra	13	6	2	5	17	18	−1	20	Qualification for promotion group 2
8	Levanger	13	5	4	4	20	18	+2	17 (Note: Levanger have been deducted 2 points.)	
9	Notodden	13	5	1	7	16	24	−8	16	
10	Nardo	13	2	6	5	12	20	−8	12	
11	Bærum	13	1	8	4	13	18	−5	11	
12	Rosenborg 2	13	3	2	8	12	24	−12	11	
13	Odd 2	13	2	3	8	9	31	−22	9	
14	Fram Larvik	13	1	3	9	17	41	−24	6	

Source: fotball.no (in Norwegian)
Rules for classification: 1) Points; 2) Goal difference; 3) Goals scored; 4) Head-to-head points; 5) Head-to-head goal difference; 6) Head-to-head away goals scored (only if between two teams); 7) Head-to-head goals scored; 8) Play-off (only used to decide champions or relegation).

==== Promotion group 2 ====
Pos	Team	Pld	W	D	L	GF	GA	GD	Pts	Promotion, qualification or relegation
1	Bryne (C, P)	19	13	5	1	47	23	+24	44	Promotion to First Division
2	Asker	19	10	7	2	38	21	+17	37	Qualification for the promotion play-offs
3	Egersund	19	10	4	5	48	22	+26	34	
4	Vard Haugesund	19	11	1	7	34	19	+15	34	
5	Arendal	19	9	5	5	32	18	+14	32	
6	Fløy-Flekkerøy	18	6	3	9	21	27	−6	21	
7	Sotra	18	6	2	10	21	34	−13	20	

Source: nifs.no (in Norwegian)
Rules for classification: 1) Points; 2) Goal difference; 3) Goals scored; 4) Head-to-head points; 5) Head-to-head goal difference; 6) Head-to-head away goals scored (only if between two teams); 7) Head-to-head goals scored; 8) Play-off (only used to decide champions or relegation).
(C) Champions; (P) Promoted

== Promotion play-offs ==
The teams who finished in second place in their respective group qualified for the promotion play-offs, where they faced each other over two legs. The winner, Asker then played against the 14th placed team in the 1. divisjon for a place in the 2021 1. divisjon.

6 December 2020
13:00 CET

Asker	1–1	Skeid
Isegran 76'	Report	Buduson 12'

Føyka Stadion, Asker
Attendance: 200
Referee: Ajdin Medic
12 December 2020
13:00 CET

Skeid	1–1 (a.e.t.)	Asker
Braaten 66'	Report	Kastrati 6'
Penalties
Buduson (penalty scored); Ali (penalty missed); Braaten (penalty scored); Hestnes (penalty scored); Berglie (penalty missed)	3–4	Mauritz-Hansen (penalty scored); Skaug (penalty scored); Fazi (penalty scored); Jones (penalty scored)

Nordre Åsen, Oslo
Attendance: 200
Referee: Jan Morten Tennøy

2–2 on aggregate. Asker won 4–3 on penalties.

== Top scorers ==
=== Group 1 ===
Rank	Player	Club	Goals
1	(Norway) Johnny Buduson	Skeid	15
2	(Norway) Henrik Kjelsrud Johansen	Fredrikstad	14
3	(Norway) Nicolay Solberg	Fredrikstad	13
4	(Norway) Jonatan Braut Brunes	Florø	10
4	(Norway) Christian Reginiussen	Alta	10
6	(Norway) Herman Henriksen	Eidsvold Turn	9
6	(Spain) Maikel	Fredrikstad	9
6	(Norway) Sondre Sandnes Beite	Brattvåg	9
9	(Norway) Riki Alba	Fredrikstad	8
9	(Norway) Robin Hjelmeseth	Hødd	8

=== Group 2 ===
Rank	Player	Club	Goals
1	(Norway) Joacim Holtan	Bryne	15
2	(Norway) Erling Flotve Myklebust	Vard Haugesund	13
3	(Norway) Thierry Dabove	Bryne	12
4	(Norway) Fitim Kastrati	Asker	11
5	(Norway) Roy Miljeteig	Vard Haugesund	9
5	(Senegal) Mame Mor Ndiaye	Fram Larvik	9
5	(Norway) Robert Undheim	Bryne	9
8	(Norway) Alexander Dang	Egersund	8
8	(Sweden) Ermal Hajdari	Egersund	8
10	(Norway) Arne Gunnes	Nardo	7
10	(The Gambia) Bob Sumareh	Egersund	7
