= Sola FK =

Norwegian football club

- Full name: Sola Fotballklubb
- Founded: 1934; 92 years ago
- Ground: Sola stadion, Sola Municipality
- Chairman: Tom Heradstveit
- Manager: Øystein Elvestad
- League: 3. divisjon (men)
- 2024: 3. divisjon group 2, 9th of 14
Home colours	Away colours

Sola Fotballklubb is a Norwegian association football club from Sola Municipality in Rogaland county.

== Overview ==
The women's football team played in the 1. divisjon, the second tier of Norwegian football, up to and including the 2012 season, after which it resigned its place in the 1. divisjon.

The men's football team currently plays in the 3. divisjon, the fourth tier of the Norwegian football league system, after being relegated from the 2019 2. divisjon. The club played in 3. divisjon for many years, except for the years 2006, 2009 and 2013 when it had visits in the 4. divisjon. They played in the 2. divisjon from 1997 to 1999. 2015 was the first season since 1999 that the club played in the second division.

Svein Fjælberg and Gunnar Aase has played for the team. Aase also coached the men's team in 2003 together with Børre Meinseth.

== Recent seasons ==
Season	League									Cup	Notes
Season	Division	Pos.	Pl.	W	D	L	GS	GA	P	Cup	Notes
2011	3. divisjon	8	26	10	5	11	50	58	35	Second qual. round	
2012	3. divisjon	↓ 13	26	6	4	16	36	77	22	First qual. round	Relegated
2013	4. divisjon	↑ 1	22	20	1	1	109	26	61	Second qual. round	Promoted
2014	3. divisjon	↑ 1	26	19	5	2	77	27	62	Second round	Promoted
2015	2. divisjon	5	26	9	8	9	49	52	35	Second round	
2016	2. divisjon	↓ 13	26	6	3	17	27	60	21	First round	Relegated
2017	3. divisjon	5	26	11	5	10	46	35	38	First round	
2018	3. divisjon	↑ 1	26	17	4	5	65	31	55	First round	Promoted
2019	2. divisjon	↓ 13	26	6	2	18	32	61	20	First round	Relegated
2020	Season cancelled										
2021	3. divisjon	2	13	8	2	3	34	18	26	Second round	
2022	3. divisjon	↓ 12	26	7	3	16	33	54	24	First round	Relegated
