= Mathias Tønnessen =

Norwegian footballer (born 2003)

Personal information
- Date of birth: 22 November 2003 (age 22)
- Height: 1.89 m (6 ft 2 in)
- Position: Centre-back

Team information
- Current team: Tromsø
- Number: 3

Youth career
- –2017: Skeid
- 2018–2022: KFUM Oslo

Senior career*
Years	Team	Apps	(Gls)
2019–2023	KFUM Oslo 2	31	(6)
2022–2025	KFUM Oslo	62	(0)
2026–	Tromsø	6	(0)

International career^{‡}
2023	Norway U20	1	(0)
- * Club domestic league appearances and goals as of 31 August 2026 ‡ National team caps and goals as of 19 January 2026

Mathias Tønnessen (born 22 November 2003) is a Norwegian footballer who plays as a centre-back for Eliteserien side Tromsø.

== Career ==
=== KFUM Oslo ===
Tønnessen came through Skeid's youth setup, before transferring to KFUM Oslo at the age of fifteen. Although he played as a winger early in his career, he changed to playing as a centre-back in 2022.

After playing the 2022 season almost exclusively in the Norwegian Fourth Division for KFUM's second team, first team head coach Johannes Moesgaard chose to move Tønnessen to the first team ahead of the 2023 season. Here, Tønnessen would get his breakthrough, playing most of the games in the league that season, which ended with promotion for KFUM and Tønnessen. In September 2023, Nettavisen had Tønnessen tenth on their list of the ten biggest talents in the Norwegian First Division.

Tønnessen signed a new three-year contract with the club in January 2024 ahead of his first season in the Eliteserien. Only five games into the 2024 season, in a game against Sarpsborg 08, Tønnessen sustained a meniscus injury, that would keep him out of play until December, when he was subbed on in the final game of the season. After his injury the previous season, Tønnessen returned for the 2025 season, playing twenty-nine out of thirty games in the league.

=== Tromsø ===
On 2 January 2026, Tromsø announced that they had signed Tønnessen, on a five-year deal. The deal was reported to cost Tromsø around €1,100,000, setting a new transfer fee record for Tromsø. Tromsø's interest went back several years, and a previous bid during the summer transfer window in 2023 had been rejected by KFUM Oslo.

== International career ==
In October 2023, Tønnessen was called up to the Norway U20 team for their games against Czechia and Romania. He started the game against Romania, before being subbed off in the 82nd minute.

== Personal life ==
Tønnessen is the son of former Norwegian record holder in the triple jump, Lene Espegren Tønnessen. His father Espen Tønnessen was a coach in the same sport, working for Olympiatoppen. Mathias Tønnessen is nicknamed "Tønna", literally "The Barrel", though derived from his name not from his slender stature.

== Career statistics ==
As of 31 August 2026

Appearances and goals by club, season and competition
Club	Season	League			National Cup		Europe		Total	
Club	Season	Division	Apps	Goals	Apps	Goals	Apps	Goals	Apps	Goals
KFUM Oslo 2	2019	Norwegian Fourth Division	1	0	—		—		1	0
KFUM Oslo 2	2021	Norwegian Fourth Division	5	1	—		—		5	1
KFUM Oslo 2	2022	Norwegian Fourth Division	23	5	—		—		23	5
KFUM Oslo 2	2023	Norwegian Third Division	2	0	—		—		2	0
KFUM Oslo 2	Total		31	6	—		—		31	6
KFUM Oslo	2022	Norwegian First Division	1	0	3	0	—		4	0
KFUM Oslo	2023	Norwegian First Division	27	0	3	0	—		30	0
KFUM Oslo	2024	Eliteserien	5	0	0	0	—		5	0
KFUM Oslo	2025	Eliteserien	29	0	5	0	—		34	0
KFUM Oslo	Total		62	0	11	0	—		73	0
Tromsø	2026	Eliteserien	6	0	0	0	5 (Note: One appearance in UEFA Europa League, four appearances in UEFA Conference League)	0	11	0
Career total			99	6	11	0	5	0	115	6
