= Mame Mor Ndiaye =

Senegalese footballer (born 1997)

Personal information
- Date of birth: 23 May 1997 (age 29)
- Place of birth: Thiès, Senegal
- Height: 1.87 m (6 ft 2 in)
- Position: Striker

Team information
- Current team: Foshan Nanshi

Senior career*
| Years | Team | Apps | (Gls) |
| 2018–2020 | Fram | 48 | (22) |
| 2020–2022 | Raufoss | 56 | (16) |
| 2023 | Åsane | 30 | (11) |
| 2024–2025 | KFUM | 42 | (6) |
| 2026 | Foshan Nanshi | 28 | (8) |
- * Club domestic league appearances and goals as of 31 October 2026

Mame Mor Ndiaye (born 23 May 1997) is a Senegalese football striker who plays for Foshan Nanshi.

Ndiaye moved with his entire family from Senegal to Brescia in Italy as a child. After being discovered in a small, local team he enjoyed a period in Brescia Primavera before playing for Rigamonti Castegnato and Rezzato. In the summer of 2018, he trained with Walsall F.C. in England. As a transfer agreement could not be made, Ndiaye stayed in England and trained with Bilston Town. Eventually, his England-based agent found an opening in Norway. Ndiaye signed for IF Fram Larvik in the third tier.

Ndiaye did not become an instant goalscorer at Fram. In early 2019 he was on trial at Kvik Halden FK, and in November 2019 he trained with first-tier club Kristiansund BK, but remained in Fram. His goalscoring picked up with 11 goals in 24 games in 2019, and 9 in 13 games in 2020.

In the summer of 2020, he had attracted interest from a handful of clubs, and ended up signing for Raufoss IL, a team firmly placed in the second tier. Ndiaye declined joining any of the teams that battled against relegation to the third tier.

The 2021 season was successful, with Ndiaye scoring 10 goals in the 2021 1. divisjon. This happened despite a dislocated shoulder in the latter stages of the season. He went on to play significantly less in 2022, especially as a starter. According to a journalist in ‘’Oppland Arbeiderblad’’, the coaches wanted their forwards to employ an even more physical style and run more. He did not leave during the summer transfer window, vowing to regain his starting spot. After the 2022 season, though, his contract with Raufoss expired. While on the lookout for a new club, he trained with IK Start. In February 2023, Ndiaye signed for Åsane.

The 2023 1. divisjon became rather successful for Ndiaye, again with 10 goals. He was the 6th top goalscorer in the league, and the most prolific goalscorer among those who did not take penalty kicks. Nettavisen named Ndiaye as the 14th best player of the 2023 1. divisjon, stating that his goals were the main reason that Åsane avoided relegation.

Nevertheless, Ndiaye only had a 1-and-a-half-year contract and Åsane hesitated in offering a new one. He signed for Eliteserien team KFUM in March 2024, shortly before the winter transfer window closed.

On 27 February 2026, Ndiaye signed with China League One club Foshan Nanshi.

== Style of play ==
Ndiaye is regarded as a target forward. His favourite player was Didier Drogba, and his favourite team AC Milan. He stated that despite holding an Italian passport, "my experience is that it’s tough there for a coloured person."

== Career statistics ==
=== Club ===
As of match played 31 October 2026

Appearances and goals by club, season and competition
| Club | Season | League | | | National cup | | Continental | | Other | | Total | |
| Club | Season | Division | Apps | Goals | Apps | Goals | Apps | Goals | Apps | Goals | Apps | Goals |
|---|---|---|---|---|---|---|---|---|---|---|---|---|
| Fram | 2018 | 2. divisjon | 11 | 2 | — | | — | | — | | 11 | 2 |
| Fram | 2019 | 2. divisjon | 24 | 11 | 4 | 3 | — | | — | | 28 | 14 |
| Fram | 2020 | 2. divisjon | 13 | 9 | — | | — | | — | | 13 | 9 |
| Fram | Total | | 48 | 22 | 4 | 3 | — | | — | | 52 | 25 |
| Raufoss | 2020 | 1. divisjon | 11 | 3 | — | | — | | 1 | 1 | 12 | 4 |
| Raufoss | 2021 | 1. divisjon | 23 | 10 | 1 | 0 | — | | — | | 24 | 10 |
| Raufoss | 2022 | 1. divisjon | 22 | 3 | 1 | 0 | — | | — | | 23 | 3 |
| Raufoss | Total | | 56 | 16 | 2 | 0 | — | | 1 | 1 | 59 | 17 |
| Åsane | 2023 | 1. divisjon | 30 | 11 | 1 | 0 | — | | — | | 31 | 11 |
| KFUM | 2024 | Eliteserien | 22 | 3 | 5 | 1 | — | | — | | 27 | 4 |
| KFUM | 2025 | Eliteserien | 20 | 3 | 2 | 0 | — | | — | | 22 | 3 |
| KFUM | Total | | 42 | 6 | 7 | 1 | — | | — | | 49 | 7 |
| Foshan Nanshi | 2026 | China League One | 28 | 8 | 0 | 0 | — | | — | | 28 | 8 |
| Career total | | | 204 | 63 | 13 | 3 | 0 | 0 | 1 | 1 | 218 | 67 |
