= 2018 Norwegian Third Division =

3. divisjon
- Season: 2018
- Champions: Oppsal; Kvik Halden; Sola; Sotra; Byåsen; Senja
- Promoted: Oppsal; Kvik Halden; Sola; Sotra; Byåsen; Senja
- Relegated: 24 teams
- Top goalscorer: Henrik Udahl (26 goals)

The 2018 3. divisjon (referred to as Norsk Tipping-ligaen for sponsorship reasons) was a fourth-tier Norwegian football league season. The league consisted of 84 teams divided into 6 groups of teams and began on 13 April 2018.

The league was played as a double round-robin tournament, where all teams played 26 matches.

== League tables ==
=== Group 1 ===
Pos	Team	Pld	W	D	L	GF	GA	GD	Pts	Promotion or relegation
1	Oppsal (P)	26	21	4	1	85	17	+68	67	Promotion to Second Division
2	Træff	26	15	8	3	65	37	+28	53	
3	Molde 2	26	17	2	7	66	42	+24	53	
4	Spjelkavik	26	12	4	10	55	46	+9	40	
5	Lokomotiv Oslo	26	12	4	10	42	35	+7	40	
6	Follo	26	9	8	9	39	47	−8	35	
7	Herd	26	10	4	12	46	48	−2	34	
8	Drøbak/Frogn	26	11	1	14	48	62	−14	34	
9	Ullern	26	10	3	13	58	54	+4	33	
10	Ready	26	9	5	12	43	53	−10	32	
11	Rilindja (R)	26	9	4	13	42	65	−23	31	Relegation to Fourth Division
12	Kristiansund 2 (R)	26	6	6	14	48	67	−19	24	Relegation to Fourth Division
13	KFUM 2 (R)	26	6	6	14	41	60	−19	24	Relegation to Fourth Division
14	Hødd 2 (R)	26	3	5	18	34	79	−45	14	Relegation to Fourth Division

Source: fotball.no (in Norwegian)
Rules for classification: 1) Points; 2) Goal difference; 3) Goals scored; 4) Head-to-head points; 5) Head-to-head goal difference; 6) Head-to-head away goals scored (only if between two teams); 7) Head-to-head goals scored; 8) Play-off (only used to decide champions or relegation).
(P) Promoted; (R) Relegated

=== Group 2 ===
Pos	Team	Pld	W	D	L	GF	GA	GD	Pts	Promotion or relegation
1	Kvik Halden (P)	26	20	3	3	65	16	+49	63	Promotion to Second Division
2	Eidsvold Turn	26	18	6	2	67	20	+47	60	
3	Lørenskog	26	17	4	5	58	34	+24	55	
4	Strømsgodset 2	26	16	1	9	82	35	+47	49	
5	Kråkerøy	26	12	6	8	40	34	+6	42	
6	Gjelleråsen	26	11	7	8	55	48	+7	40	
7	Valdres	26	12	2	12	52	46	+6	38	
8	Lillestrøm 2	26	11	4	11	54	46	+8	37	
9	Vestfossen	26	11	2	13	48	53	−5	35	
10	Skjetten	26	8	4	14	39	60	−21	28	
11	Bjørnevatn (R)	26	6	4	16	23	61	−38	22	Relegation to Fourth Division
12	Skedsmo (R)	26	5	6	15	29	50	−21	21	Relegation to Fourth Division
13	Østsiden (R)	26	4	9	13	35	68	−33	21	Relegation to Fourth Division
14	Selbak (R)	26	0	4	22	24	100	−76	4	Relegation to Fourth Division

Source: fotball.no (in Norwegian)
Rules for classification: 1) Points; 2) Goal difference; 3) Goals scored; 4) Head-to-head points; 5) Head-to-head goal difference; 6) Head-to-head away goals scored (only if between two teams); 7) Head-to-head goals scored; 8) Play-off (only used to decide champions or relegation).
(P) Promoted; (R) Relegated

=== Group 3 ===
Pos	Team	Pld	W	D	L	GF	GA	GD	Pts	Promotion or relegation
1	Sola (P)	26	17	4	5	65	31	+34	55	Promotion to Second Division
2	Ørn-Horten	26	15	7	4	66	24	+42	52	
3	Vindbjart	26	15	2	9	58	48	+10	47	
4	Tønsberg	26	13	7	6	54	30	+24	46	
5	Donn	26	12	5	9	63	48	+15	41	
6	Halsen	26	12	4	10	55	42	+13	40	
7	Pors	26	11	4	11	58	51	+7	37	
8	Staal Jørpeland	26	10	7	9	52	46	+6	37	
9	Start 2	26	10	6	10	63	50	+13	36	
10	Madla	26	10	6	10	46	49	−3	36	
11	Sandefjord 2 (R)	26	10	3	13	51	53	−2	33	Relegation to Fourth Division
12	Urædd (R)	26	8	3	15	41	53	−12	27	Relegation to Fourth Division
13	Åssiden (R)	26	4	4	18	30	84	−54	16	Relegation to Fourth Division
14	Egersund 2 (R)	26	3	2	21	24	117	−93	11	Relegation to Fourth Division

Source: fotball.no (in Norwegian)
Rules for classification: 1) Points; 2) Goal difference; 3) Goals scored; 4) Head-to-head points; 5) Head-to-head goal difference; 6) Head-to-head away goals scored (only if between two teams); 7) Head-to-head goals scored; 8) Play-off (only used to decide champions or relegation).
(P) Promoted; (R) Relegated

=== Group 4 ===
Pos	Team	Pld	W	D	L	GF	GA	GD	Pts	Promotion or relegation
1	Sotra (P)	26	17	5	4	80	32	+48	56	Promotion to Second Division
2	Fyllingsdalen	26	17	3	6	63	31	+32	54	
3	Lysekloster	26	16	4	6	75	30	+45	52	
4	Viking 2	26	14	4	8	77	44	+33	46	
5	Brodd	26	13	4	9	66	47	+19	43	
6	Brann 2	26	13	3	10	72	50	+22	42	
7	Fana	26	13	1	12	49	44	+5	40	
8	Vardeneset	26	11	4	11	52	64	−12	37	
9	Sogndal 2	26	11	1	14	53	68	−15	34	
10	Stord	26	8	6	12	51	62	−11	30	
11	Tertnes (R)	26	9	3	14	39	68	−29	30	Relegation to Fourth Division
12	Øystese (R)	26	7	3	16	39	75	−36	24	Relegation to Fourth Division
13	Førde (R)	26	4	8	14	32	68	−36	20	Relegation to Fourth Division
14	Varegg (R)	26	3	3	20	18	83	−65	12	Relegation to Fourth Division

Source: nifs.no (in Norwegian)
Rules for classification: 1) Points; 2) Goal difference; 3) Goals scored; 4) Head-to-head points; 5) Head-to-head goal difference; 6) Head-to-head away goals scored (only if between two teams); 7) Head-to-head goals scored; 8) Play-off (only used to decide champions or relegation).
(P) Promoted; (R) Relegated

=== Group 5 ===
Pos	Team	Pld	W	D	L	GF	GA	GD	Pts	Promotion or relegation
1	Byåsen (P)	26	18	4	4	66	25	+41	58	Promotion to Second Division
2	Rosenborg 2	26	15	7	4	80	35	+45	52	
3	Tillerbyen	26	12	7	7	49	34	+15	43	
4	Brumunddal	26	11	10	5	43	32	+11	43	
5	Verdal	26	10	7	9	31	37	−6	37	
6	Orkla	26	11	2	13	51	56	−5	35	
7	Gjøvik-Lyn	26	10	5	11	39	48	−9	35	
8	Steinkjer	26	10	4	12	48	46	+2	34	
9	Melhus	26	9	7	10	42	44	−2	34	
10	Kolstad	26	9	6	11	51	63	−12	33	
11	Levanger 2 (R)	26	9	4	13	48	65	−17	31	Relegation to Fourth Division
12	Tynset (R)	26	8	4	14	45	48	−3	28	Relegation to Fourth Division
13	Løten (R)	26	7	7	12	35	58	−23	28	Relegation to Fourth Division
14	Ottestad (R)	26	4	4	18	32	69	−37	16	Relegation to Fourth Division

Source: nifs.no (in Norwegian)
Rules for classification: 1) Points; 2) Goal difference; 3) Goals scored; 4) Head-to-head points; 5) Head-to-head goal difference; 6) Head-to-head away goals scored (only if between two teams); 7) Head-to-head goals scored; 8) Play-off (only used to decide champions or relegation).
(P) Promoted; (R) Relegated

=== Group 6 ===
Pos	Team	Pld	W	D	L	GF	GA	GD	Pts	Promotion or relegation
1	Senja (P)	26	18	4	4	63	23	+40	58	Promotion to Second Division
2	Frigg	26	16	7	3	64	14	+50	55	
3	Lyn	26	17	2	7	74	40	+34	53	
4	Fløya	26	14	5	7	56	35	+21	47	
5	Junkeren	26	13	7	6	76	42	+34	46	
6	Harstad	26	13	3	10	57	52	+5	42	
7	Grei	26	12	4	10	47	39	+8	40	
8	Finnsnes	26	8	10	8	41	34	+7	34	
9	Skjervøy	26	8	5	13	49	55	−6	29	
10	Melbo	26	8	4	14	36	61	−25	28	
11	Skarp (R)	26	6	9	11	49	57	−8	27	Relegation to Fourth Division
12	Korsvoll (R)	26	6	4	16	28	56	−28	22	Relegation to Fourth Division
13	Stålkameratene (R)	26	4	4	18	38	94	−56	16	Relegation to Fourth Division
14	Sortland (R)	26	3	4	19	28	104	−76	13	Relegation to Fourth Division

Source: nifs.no (in Norwegian)
Rules for classification: 1) Points; 2) Goal difference; 3) Goals scored; 4) Head-to-head points; 5) Head-to-head goal difference; 6) Head-to-head away goals scored (only if between two teams); 7) Head-to-head goals scored; 8) Play-off (only used to decide champions or relegation).
(P) Promoted; (R) Relegated

== Top scorers ==
Rank	Player	Club	Goals
1	(Norway) Henrik Udahl	Fana	26
2	(Norway) Sindre Haarberg	Brodd	25
3	(Norway) Vital Curtis Kaba	Frigg	24
3	(Norway) Øystein Lundblad Næsheim	Kvik Halden	24
3	(Norway) Ivar Johannes Unhjem	Junkeren	24
6	(Norway) Sondre Bergstedt Flaat	Skarp	23
7	(Norway) Lasse Bransdal	Oppsal	21
8	(Norway) Andreas Hanssen	Byåsen	19
8	(Norway) Erik Bjørkli Helgetun	Orkla	19
8	(Norway) Stian Ingebrethsen	Donn	19
8	(Norway) Christer Johnsgård	Senja	19
8	(Norway) Sindre Sakshaug	Steinkjer	19
8	(Norway) Kristoffer Stava	Sotra	19
