= Fredrik Berglie =

Norwegian footballer (born 2002)

Personal information
- Full name: Fredrik Tobias Berglie
- Date of birth: 28 December 1996 (age 29)
- Place of birth: Norway
- Position: Central defender

Team information
- Current team: KFUM
- Number: 5

Youth career
- Halsen

Senior career*
Years	Team	Apps	(Gls)
2013–2018	Halsen		
2019–2022	Skeid	89	(5)
2023–2024	Sandefjord	40	(1)
2025–	KFUM	35	(0)
- * Club domestic league appearances and goals as of 23 July 2026

Fredrik Berglie (born 28 December 1996) is a Norwegian footballer who plays as a centre-back for KFUM.

== Career ==
He grew up in the Larvik-based club Halsen IF, where he also made his senior debut. Ahead of the 2018 3. divisjon campaign, he was repurposed from a central midfielder to defender. Berglie moved to Oslo and Skeid in 2019, and was made team captain by manager Gard Holme in 2020.

After four seasons, Berglie received an offer to return to Vestfold and sign for Sandefjord Fotball. He moved on to KFUM in 2025.
