= Ayoub Aleesami =

Norwegian footballer (born 1997)

Personal information
- Date of birth: 9 February 1996 (age 30)
- Height: 1.85 m (6 ft 1 in)
- Position: Defender

Team information
- Current team: KFUM
- Number: 3

Youth career
- Holmlia
- –2013: Lyn
- 2014–2015: Skeid

Senior career*
Years	Team	Apps	(Gls)
2015–2019	Skeid	67	(3)
2020–2022	Fredrikstad	49	(3)
2022–	KFUM	71	(3)
- * Club domestic league appearances and goals as of 1 December 2025

Ayoub Aleesami (born 9 February 1996) is a Norwegian professional footballer who plays as a defender for KFUM.

== Personal life ==
Ayoub Aleesami is the younger brother of Haitam Aleesami, both being of Moroccan descent. While Ayoub and Haitam have similar appearances, the latter is vastly more known due to him playing internationally, thus Ayoub is often confused for Haitam in the street.

== Career ==
Aleesami started his career in Holmlia SK. He also played youth football for Lyn, leaving after the 2013 season for Skeid, for whom he made his senior debut in the 2015 2. divisjon. In the winter of 2015–16 he trained with Halmstads BK among others, but decided to pen a two-year contract with Skeid.

Being a defender, Aleesami scored very seldomly, but managed to get a goal in the 2018 Norwegian Football Cup where Skeid eliminated first-tier club Sandefjord. In October 2018, he scored the only goal against Arendal, which put Skeid in a promising position in the hunt for promotion. Winning promotion, Skeid experienced a good start to their 2019 1. divisjon campaign.

After Skeid was relegated, Aleesami started the 2020 2. divisjon campaign with them, before moving to rivals Fredrikstad FK in July. His brother played there many years prior. Fredrikstad won promotion in 2020 and Skeid in 2021; when the teams met in 2022, Aleesami scored the decisive goal of the match. However, Aleesami was mostly benched by Fredrikstad in 2022, and in the summer he moved back to Oslo and KFUM.

In the 2023 1. divisjon, Aleesami helped KFUM win promotion. As the team prepared for the 2024 Eliteserien, they made a surprise signing when Ayoub's brother Haitam decided to return to Norway. It was the first time the brothers had played on the same team. Ayoub Aleesami made his Eliteserien debut in May 2024 against Fredrikstad, and scored his first Eliteserien goal against Molde, converting a corner with a header. He also scored against Stabæk in the cup.

== Honours ==
Skeid

- 2. divisjon: 2018

Fredrikstad

- 2. divisjon: 2020
