= Håkon Helland Hoseth =

Norwegian footballer (born 2002)

Håkon Hoseth
Personal information
- Full name: Håkon Helland Hoseth
- Date of birth: 19 March 1999 (age 27)
- Place of birth: Norway
- Height: 1.82 m (6 ft 0 in)
- Position: Midfielder

Team information
- Current team: KFUM
- Number: 14

Youth career
- Ullern

Senior career*
| Years | Team | Apps | (Gls) |
| 2015–2019 | Ullern | 89 | (6) |
| 2020– | KFUM | 138 | (8) |
- * Club domestic league appearances and goals as of 23 July 2026

Håkon Helland Hoseth (born 19 March 1999) is a Norwegian footballer who plays as a midfielder for KFUM.

== Career ==
He grew up in the Oslo-based club Ullern IF, where he also made his senior debut in 2015. He moved to KFUM in 2020. With Hoseth having played 97 games for Ullern, 89 in the league and 8 in the cup, Ullern IF were proud of developing another elite midfielder three years after Felix Horn Myhre left the club.

In the 2023 1. divisjon, Hoseth won promotion to Eliteserien with KFUM, thus making his Eliteserien debut in 2024. His first Eliteserien goal came as fast as on 7 April 2024. Described as a "dream strike", the goal secured a draw with Kristiansund. His second goal came in the last match of the season, finalizing a 2–0 win over Hamkam in what was described as a "dreadful" and "pitch-black" game for the losing team. In 2025 Hoseth again scored against Hamkam.

== Personal life ==
He is a second cousin of footballer Pål André Helland.
