= Oppsal IF =

Norwegian sports club

- Full name: Oppsal Idrettsforening
- Founded: 4 August 1912
- Ground: Trasop idrettspark Oppsal Arena (basketball, handball)

Oppsal Idrettsforening (founded on 4 August 1912 as Bryn Atletklubb) is a multi-sports club from Oslo, Norway. The club has sections for basketball, football, handball, ice hockey, cross-country skiing, athletics and orienteering.

The club's home ground is Trasop. Trasop consists of a combined athletics and football field (grass), as well as a gravel field and an artificial turf field. The handball section has their home matches in Oppsal Arena.

== History ==
Oppsal Idrettsforening is the result of several mergers. Bryn Atletklubb is the very oldest predecessor, so the date this club was founded, 4 August 1912, is considered the club's foundation date.

- Bryn Atletklubb (founded on 4 August 1912) and Bryn Sportsklubb (founded in autumn 1912) merged in 1914 to form Bryn Sport- og Atletklubb, but this name was changed in 1925 to Bryn Idrettsforening.
- Bryn Sportsklubb merged on 4 September 1927 with Oppsal Sportsklubb (founded on 10 August 1915) and Ulven Idrettsforening (founded on 1 July 1916). Together they formed Idrettsforeningen Bjart.
- Bjart joined forces in 1945 with Idrettsforeningen Freidig (founded on 15 June 1928) and Ulven Idrettsforening (founded on 22 June 1913). The association took the name Idrettsforeningen B.F.G..
- B.F.G. merged on 1 January 1970 with Oppsal Idrettsforening (founded 1 July 1940) and Trasop Ishockeyklubb (founded 6 January 1965). The result of the merger was Oppsal Idrettsforening. On 9 November 2005, the club changed this name to Oppsal Alliance-Idrettsforening.

== Basketball ==
Oppsal Basket was established in 1972 when Oslo Basket joined Oppsal IF. As part of the larger Oppsal Allianseidrettslag since 2005, the basketball section has grown from a small senior-focused group into one of Norway’s largest basketball clubs. By 2022, it had 460 members, fielding teams at all levels, including a men’s 1st division team, and has a strong record of national-level participation.

== Handball ==
The history of the handball section goes a long time back. The men's team was dominant in the domestic competitions in the 1970s, and qualified for European participation 9 times. In recent years, the women's team are the section's flagship. The women's team recently gained promotion to REMA 1000-ligaen after a season on level 2 in Norwegian handball.

== Football ==
Oppsal IF Fotball
- Full name: Oppsal Idrettsforening Fotball
- Founded: June 1, 1946; 79 years ago
- Ground: Trasop Idrettspark
- League: 3. divisjon
- 2024: 3. divisjon, 7th of 14
- Website: https://oppsal-if-fotball.spoortz.no/
Home colours

The men's association football team currently compete in the 3. divisjon, the fourth tier of the Norwegian football league system, after being relegated from the 2019 2. divisjon.

=== Recent men's seasons ===
Season		Pos.	Pl.	W	D	L	GS	GA	P	Cup	Notes
2015	3. divisjon	↑ 1	26	18	4	4	74	28	58	First round	Promoted to 2. divisjon
2016	2. divisjon	↓ 10	26	8	5	13	36	53	29	First round	Relegated to 3. divisjon
2017	3. divisjon	4	26	14	3	9	58	49	45	First round	
2018	3. divisjon	↑ 1	26	21	4	1	85	17	67	First round	Promoted to 2. divisjon
2019	2. divisjon	↓ 13	26	6	6	14	35	60	24	First round	Relegated to 3. divisjon
2020	Season cancelled										
2021	3. divisjon	5	13	5	4	4	17	20	19	First round	
2022	3. divisjon	11	26	7	6	13	38	49	27	First round	
