= Momodou Lion Njie =

Gambian footballer

Personal information
- Date of birth: 10 December 2001 (age 24)
- Place of birth: Oslo, Norway
- Height: 1.91 m (6 ft 3 in)
- Position: Centre-back

Team information
- Current team: KFUM Oslo
- Number: 4

Youth career
- 2014–2016: Kolbotn
- 2017: Vålerenga
- 2017–2018: Kolbotn
- 2019: Follo
- 2020: Skeid

Senior career*
Years	Team	Apps	(Gls)
2018	Kolbotn	14	(2)
2019	Follo 2	11	(0)
2021	Moss FK	16	(2)
2022–	KFUM	79	(2)
2025	→ Sarpsborg 08 (loan)	1	(0)

International career^{‡}
2024–	Gambia	6	(0)
- * Club domestic league appearances and goals as of 23 July 2026 ‡ National team caps and goals as of 11 May 2026

Momodou Lion Njie (born 10 December 2001) is a professional footballer who plays as a centre-back for KFUM. Born in Norway, he plays for the Gambia national team.

== Club career ==
Njie is a product of the academy of Kolbotn and made his debut with Kolbotn in the Norwegian Fourth Division in 2018. He also had stints as a youth player in Vålerenga, Follo FK and Skeid during which he also played for Follo's reserves. In 2021, he played for Moss FK in the Norwegian Second Division. On 13 January 2022, he transferred to KFUM in the Norwegian First Division. He helped KFUM Oslo achieve promotion to the Eliteserien for the 2024 season, and on 9 January 2024 extended his contract with the club.

A 10 million kr move to US Lecce in January 2025 ultimately collapsed. On 2 September 2025, he joined Sarpsborg on loan in the Eliteserien for the remainder of the 2025 season.

== International career ==
Born in Norway, Njie is of Gambian descent. He was called up to The Gambia national team for a set of 2025 Africa Cup of Nations qualification matches in September 2025. He made his debut in a 1–0 away win over Tunisia.

== Personal life ==
Njie is the cousin of the professional footballers Moussa and Bilal Njie. All three played for KFUM at the same time. He is the nephew of the Gambian musician Ousu ‘Lion’ Njie.
