= Bilal Njie =

Somali footballer (born 1998)

Personal information
- Full name: Bilal Elmi Njie
- Date of birth: 13 June 1998 (age 28)
- Place of birth: Oslo, Norway
- Height: 1.83 m (6 ft 0 in)
- Position: Winger

Team information
- Current team: KFUM
- Number: 10

Youth career
- –2014: Holmlia
- 2014–2017: Vålerenga

Senior career*
Years	Team	Apps	(Gls)
2017	Vålerenga 2	20	(5)
2017	Vålerenga	1	(0)
2018–2020	Odd	38	(3)
2020–2022	KFUM	29	(9)
2022–2024	Haugesund	49	(11)
2024–2025	Odd	37	(2)
2025–	KFUM	34	(10)

International career^{‡}
2023–	Somalia	6	(1)
- * Club domestic league appearances and goals as of 22 November 2026 ‡ National team caps and goals as of 22 November 2026

Bilal Elmi Njie (born 13 June 1998) is a footballer who plays as a winger for Eliteserien club KFUM. Born in Norway, he plays for the Somalia national team.

== Career ==
=== Vålerenga ===
Njie began his career at Vålerenga, and made his first team debut on 30 September 2017 in a 4-2 loss vs. Stabæk Fotball, coming on as a late substitute. He also made 20 appearances for the reserve team in the 2017 season.

=== Odd ===
Before the 2018 season, Njie signed a three-year contract with the Skien-based club Odd, instead of signing with his youth club Vålerenga. According to Njie, he chose to sign with Odd because of their well-known ability to develop young players.

=== KFUM ===
Njie signed for KFUM-Kameratene Oslo on 5 October 2020.

On 5 December 2021, in the promotion playoffs for a spot in the Eliteserien, Njie scored two goals in their quarterfinal win over Fredrikstad, including a stoppage time equalizer to send the match to penalty kicks.

== International career ==
Bilal was born in Norway to a Gambian father and Somali mother, and was eligible for all three national teams. He played for the Somalia national team in a set of friendlies in October 2023.

== Personal life ==
Bilal is the younger brother of the footballer Moussa Njie.

== Career statistics ==
=== Club ===
As of match played 22 November 2026

Appearances and goals by club, season and competition
Club	Season	League			Cup		Other		Total	
Club	Season	Division	Apps	Goals	Apps	Goals	Apps	Goals	Apps	Goals
Vålerenga	2017	Eliteserien	1	0	0	0	—		1	0
Odd	2018	Eliteserien	22	3	4	1	—		26	4
Odd	2019	Eliteserien	6	0	0	0	—		6	0
Odd	2020	Eliteserien	10	0	—		—		10	0
Odd	Total		38	3	4	1	—		42	4
KFUM	2020	1. divisjon	11	3	—		—		11	3
KFUM	2021	1. divisjon	18	6	3	1	3	4	24	11
KFUM	2022	1. divisjon	0	0	2	1	0	0	2	1
KFUM	Total		29	9	5	2	3	4	37	15
Haugesund	2022	Eliteserien	23	6	4	0	—		27	6
Haugesund	2023	Eliteserien	26	5	2	3	—		28	8
Haugesund	Total		49	11	6	3	—		55	14
Odd	2024	Eliteserien	24	2	2	0	—		26	2
Odd	2025	OBOS-ligaen	15	0	0	0	—		15	0
Odd	Total		39	2	2	0	—		41	2
KFUM	2025	Eliteserien	13	1	1	1	—		14	2
KFUM	2026	Eliteserien	21	9	0	0	—		21	9
KFUM	Total		34	10	1	1	—		35	11
Career total			190	33	18	7	3	4	211	45

=== International ===
As of match played 16 November 2026

Appearances and goals by national team and year
National team	Year	Apps	Goals
Somalia	2026	6	1
Total		6	1

Scores and results list Somalia's goal tally first.

List of international goals scored by Bilal Njie
No.	Date	Venue	Opponent	Score	Result	Competition
1.	25 September 2026	Independence Stadium, Bakau, Gambia	Gambia	1–1	1–2	2027 Africa Cup of Nations qualification
