= 2022 Norwegian Third Division =

Norwegian football season

Norwegian Third Division
- Season: 2022
- Promoted: Lyn; Aalesund 2 Brann 2 Fram Larvik; Junkeren; Strømsgodset 2
- Relegated: 17 teams
- Matches played: 1,092
- Goals scored: 4,397 (4.03 per match)
- Top goalscorer: David Tavakoli (27 goals)

The 2022 Norwegian Third Division (referred to as Norsk Tipping-ligaen for sponsorship reasons) was a fourth-tier Norwegian football league season. The league consisted of 84 teams divided into 6 groups of 14 teams each. The season started on 9 April 2022 and ended on 23 October 2022. The league was played as a double round-robin tournament, where all teams played 26 matches.

== League tables ==
=== Group 1 ===
Pos	Team	Pld	W	D	L	GF	GA	GD	Pts	Promotion or relegation
1	Lyn (P)	26	22	4	0	88	24	+64	70	Promotion to Second Division
2	Nordstrand	26	20	2	4	60	26	+34	62	
3	Os	26	13	5	8	72	54	+18	44	
4	Grorud 2	26	13	4	9	57	49	+8	43	
5	Lokomotiv Oslo	26	12	4	10	40	42	−2	40	
6	Skeid 2	26	10	9	7	55	58	−3	39	
7	Sandviken	26	10	6	10	53	60	−7	36	
8	Fyllingsdalen	26	11	2	13	51	55	−4	35	
9	Stabæk 2	26	9	5	12	53	53	0	32	
10	Frøya	26	10	2	14	38	54	−16	32	
11	Oppsal	26	7	6	13	38	49	−11	27	
12	Kjelsås 2 (R)	26	5	7	14	30	41	−11	22	Relegation to Fourth Division
13	Grei (R)	26	4	5	17	35	74	−39	17	Relegation to Fourth Division
14	Ready (R)	26	4	3	19	32	63	−31	15	Relegation to Fourth Division

Source: NIFS (in Norwegian)
Rules for classification: 1) Points; 2) Goal difference; 3) Goals scored; 4) Head-to-head points; 5) Head-to-head goal difference; 6) Head-to-head goals scored.
(P) Promoted; (R) Relegated

=== Group 2 ===
Pos	Team	Pld	W	D	L	GF	GA	GD	Pts	Promotion or relegation
1	Aalesund 2 (P)	26	19	4	3	60	17	+43	61	Promotion to Second Division
2	Førde	26	17	4	5	68	32	+36	55	
3	Elverum	26	16	7	3	64	34	+30	55	
4	Florø	26	15	4	7	53	27	+26	49	
5	Molde 2	26	15	2	9	76	49	+27	47	
6	Spjelkavik	26	11	7	8	45	43	+2	40	
7	Hønefoss	26	11	4	11	56	46	+10	37	
8	Brumunddal	26	8	6	12	51	48	+3	30	
9	Volda	26	8	5	13	44	53	−9	29	
10	Hødd 2	26	8	4	14	48	66	−18	28	
11	Raufoss 2	26	8	4	14	38	70	−32	28	
12	Kongsvinger 2 (R)	26	6	7	13	47	67	−20	25	Relegation to Fourth Division
13	Lillehammer (R)	26	4	7	15	27	55	−28	19	Relegation to Fourth Division
14	Toten (R)	26	3	1	22	26	96	−70	10	Relegation to Fourth Division

Source: NIFS (in Norwegian)
Rules for classification: 1) Points; 2) Goal difference; 3) Goals scored; 4) Head-to-head points; 5) Head-to-head goal difference; 6) Head-to-head goals scored.
(P) Promoted; (R) Relegated

=== Group 3 ===
Pos	Team	Pld	W	D	L	GF	GA	GD	Pts	Promotion or relegation
1	Brann 2 (P)	26	18	3	5	66	27	+39	57	Promotion to Second Division
2	Fana	26	16	3	7	68	43	+25	51	
3	Lysekloster	26	13	6	7	62	38	+24	45	
4	Brodd	26	14	2	10	36	35	+1	44	
5	Vidar	26	12	6	8	54	42	+12	42	
6	Bjarg	26	12	5	9	47	44	+3	41	
7	Sandnes Ulf 2	26	10	6	10	62	63	−1	36	
8	Viking 2	26	10	5	11	57	55	+2	35	
9	Stord	26	11	2	13	62	70	−8	35	
10	Djerv 1919	26	9	6	11	56	52	+4	33	
11	Bremnes	26	9	2	15	45	64	−19	29	
12	Sola (R)	26	7	3	16	33	54	−21	24	Relegation to Fourth Division
13	Haugesund 2 (R)	26	6	5	15	46	67	−21	23	Relegation to Fourth Division
14	Åkra (R)	26	5	6	15	38	78	−40	21	Relegation to Fourth Division

Source: NIFS (in Norwegian)
Rules for classification: 1) Points; 2) Goal difference; 3) Goals scored; 4) Head-to-head points; 5) Head-to-head goal difference; 6) Head-to-head goals scored.
(P) Promoted; (R) Relegated

=== Group 4 ===
Pos	Team	Pld	W	D	L	GF	GA	GD	Pts	Promotion or relegation
1	Fram Larvik (P)	26	18	7	1	60	20	+40	61	Promotion to Second Division
2	Follo	26	18	4	4	63	31	+32	58	
3	Pors	26	16	4	6	67	39	+28	52	
4	Eik Tønsberg	26	14	7	5	54	31	+23	49	
5	Fredrikstad 2	26	11	6	9	64	49	+15	39	
6	Sprint-Jeløy	26	9	8	9	50	53	−3	35	
7	Sarpsborg 08 2	26	10	3	13	46	58	−12	33	
8	Randesund	26	8	8	10	40	51	−11	32	
9	Halsen	26	9	4	13	46	65	−19	31	
10	Vindbjart	26	7	8	11	53	48	+5	29	
11	Mandalskameratene	26	7	6	13	52	59	−7	27	
12	Start 2 (Note: Start 2 escaped relegation as the best 12th-placed team due to Øygarden's withdrawal from the 2022 Norwegian Second Division.)	26	7	5	14	44	57	−13	26	
13	Express (R)	26	5	4	17	33	66	−33	19	Relegation to Fourth Division
14	Urædd (R)	26	3	6	17	27	72	−45	15	Relegation to Fourth Division

Source: NIFS (in Norwegian)
Rules for classification: 1) Points; 2) Goal difference; 3) Goals scored; 4) Head-to-head points; 5) Head-to-head goal difference; 6) Head-to-head goals scored.
(P) Promoted; (R) Relegated

=== Group 5 ===
Pos	Team	Pld	W	D	L	GF	GA	GD	Pts	Promotion or relegation
1	Junkeren (P)	26	23	3	0	86	24	+62	72	Promotion to Second Division
2	Byåsen	26	19	2	5	84	25	+59	59	
3	Nardo	26	17	5	4	79	42	+37	56	
4	Strindheim	26	14	3	9	74	48	+26	45	
5	Kolstad	26	12	3	11	59	63	−4	39	
6	Rosenborg 2	26	11	4	11	62	60	+2	37	
7	Rana	26	12	1	13	59	64	−5	37	
8	Bodø/Glimt 2	26	10	3	13	58	56	+2	33	
9	Tiller	26	10	3	13	62	65	−3	33	
10	Steinkjer	26	10	2	14	36	61	−25	32	
11	Orkla	26	7	5	14	50	72	−22	26	
12	Trygg/Lade (R)	26	6	1	19	30	62	−32	19	Relegation to Fourth Division
13	Melhus (R)	26	5	4	17	28	72	−44	19	Relegation to Fourth Division
14	Innstranda (R)	26	4	5	17	33	86	−53	17	Relegation to Fourth Division

Source: NIFS (in Norwegian)
Rules for classification: 1) Points; 2) Goal difference; 3) Goals scored; 4) Head-to-head points; 5) Head-to-head goal difference; 6) Head-to-head goals scored.
(P) Promoted; (R) Relegated

=== Group 6 ===
Pos	Team	Pld	W	D	L	GF	GA	GD	Pts	Promotion or relegation
1	Strømsgodset 2 (P)	26	19	3	4	88	38	+50	60	Promotion to Second Division
2	Gjelleråsen	26	19	0	7	77	42	+35	57	
3	Fløya	26	15	4	7	58	35	+23	49	
4	Lørenskog	26	14	6	6	61	34	+27	48	
5	Mjølner	26	13	3	10	59	43	+16	42	
6	Tromsø 2	26	13	2	11	69	44	+25	41	
7	Fu/Vo	26	11	4	11	49	48	+1	37	
8	Lillestrøm 2	26	10	4	12	44	53	−9	34	
9	Mjøndalen 2	26	10	3	13	50	54	−4	33	
10	Skjetten	26	10	2	14	49	76	−27	32	
11	Skjervøy	26	8	4	14	37	58	−21	28	
12	Harstad (R)	26	7	2	17	50	78	−28	23	Relegation to Fourth Division
13	Bossekop (R)	26	5	5	16	37	78	−41	20	Relegation to Fourth Division
14	Senja (R)	26	5	4	17	33	80	−47	19	Relegation to Fourth Division

Source: NIFS (in Norwegian)
Rules for classification: 1) Points; 2) Goal difference; 3) Goals scored; 4) Head-to-head points; 5) Head-to-head goal difference; 6) Head-to-head goals scored.
(P) Promoted; (R) Relegated

== Top scorers ==
Rank	Player	Club	Goals
1	(Norway) David Tavakoli	Lyn	27
2	(Norway) Oliver Aaser Midtgård	Nordstrand	25
2	(Norway) Tim Nilsen	Fana	25
4	(Portugal) Nelson de Jesus Correia	Florø	22
4	(Norway) Simen Haughom	Vidar	22
6	(Norway) Martin Tornes Kjørsvik	Molde 2	20
6	(Norway) Marius Bustgaard Larsen	Pors	20
6	(Norway) Mads Kjernsby Rismoen	Fu/Vo	20
6	(Norway) Ivar Johannes Unhjem	Junkeren	20
10	(Norway) Sander Aamelfot	Førde	17
10	(Norway) Omar Fonstad el Ghaouti	Hønefoss	17
10	(Norway) Vuk Fajfric	Lørenskog	17
10	(Norway) Alexander Iversen	Rana	17
10	(Norway) Elias Heggland Myrlid	Brann 2	17
10	(Norway) Magnus Solum	Elverum	17
10	(Norway) Emil Åkvåg	Gjelleråsen	17
