= KFUM Arena =

Football stadium in Oslo, Norway

- "Arenaen" ("The Arena")
- Interactive map of KFUM Arena
- Location: Ekebergveien 109, 1178 Oslo; Norway
- Coordinates: 59°53′22″N 10°46′59″E
- Owner: KFUM Oslo
- Operator: KFUM Oslo
- Capacity: 3,300
- Surface: Artificial turf
- Record attendance: 2,236 (KFUM Oslo vs Odds Ballklubb, September 26th 2019)
- Field size: 105 by 64 metres (114.8 yd × 70.0 yd)

Construction
- Built: 2007
- Opened: 19 November 2007
- Renovated: 2015
- Cost: NOK 10 million

Tenant
- KFUM Oslo (2007–present)

KFUM Arena is a football stadium located at Ekeberg in Oslo, Norway, and is the home of Norwegian Eliteserien club KFUM Oslo. The stadium is under reconstruction to temporarily get a capacity of 3,300 seats. KFUM is a translation of the English language YMCA.

== Facilities ==
The arena is owned by KFUM-Kameratene Oslo. It was opened on 19 November 2007. The construction costs were estimated to around NOK 10 million. The pitch itself is 64 x 105 meters and has artificial turf, under-soil heating and an automatic watering system. The stadium is located next to a sports hall; KFUM-hallen.

In the aftermath of KFUM's promotion to the second tier in 2015, the artificial turf was changed and the stands were upgraded.

There are plans of major upgrades of the existing facilities. The project has been named KFUM Familiearena and will increase the seated capacity to 2,400. The arena will also include a swimming-pool, fitness-center, a kindergarten, indoor football arena for kids, a cafe, offices and meeting areas.

Before their inaugural season in Eliteserien, KFUM temporarily increased the capacity to 3,300.

== Attendances ==
The attendance record is as of today at 2236 from the quarter-finals in the Norwegian championship in 2019 against Odds ballklubb, a match KFUM lost 2–5. The previous record was 1866 spectators when KFUM met Vålerenga in the third round of the Norwegian Cup in 2016. Vålerenga won the game 2–0.

=== Average attendances ===
This shows the average attendance on KFUM Oslo's home games in one of the two top tiers since 2016, their first season at the second tier since the opening of KFUM Arena.

†	1. divisjon
	2. divisjon

Attendance
Season	Avg	Min	Max	Rank	Ref.
2016	466	204	1,243	16†	
2017–2018	N/A				
2019	901	505	1,701	11†	
2020* (in progress)	197	155	200	15†	

* Due to COVID-19 restrictions the maximum number of spectators in Oslo in 2020 was limited to 200.
