= KFUM-Kameratene Oslo =

KFUM Oslo
- Full name: KFUM-Kameratene Oslo
- Nickname: "Kåffa"
- Founded: 1 January 1939; 87 years ago
- Ground: KFUM Arena, Ekeberg, Oslo
- Capacity: 3,300
- Manager: Jørgen Isnes
- League: Eliteserien
- 2025: Eliteserien, 12th of 16
- Website: www.kaaffa.no
Home colours	Away colours

KFUM-Kameratene Oslo is the sports branch of the local YMCA in Oslo, Norway. It has departments for association football, futsal, volleyball, and track and field. The football team currently plays in Eliteserien from 2024, the top tier of the Norwegian football league system after promotion from Norwegian First Division in 2023.

The club was founded on 1 January 1939, the clubs traditional base are in downtown Oslo. Today the team plays its matches at KFUM Arena, located at Ekebergsletta.

== Football ==
In 2008, KFUM-Kameratene Oslo won their 3. divisjon group and the promotion playoff, earning a spot in the 2. divisjon, the 3rd tier of Norwegian football. The team had previously fallen short in the 2004 promotion playoff. In their debut season at the third tier, KFUM finished in a strong fourth place. They narrowly missed promotion again in 2010 and 2013, finishing second both times.

In 2015, under the guidance of former footballer Ståle Andersen, KFUM finally clinched promotion to the 1. divisjon by winning Group 1. The team continued to impress in 2018, finishing second in the 2. divisjon group 2 and qualifying for the promotion playoffs. They secured promotion to the 2019 1. divisjon. divisjon by defeating Åsane 4–3 on aggregate in the playoffs.

In 2023, KFUM made history by earning promotion to the Eliteserien for the first time. The decisive moment came with a 1–0 victory over Skeid, with Remi-André Svindland scoring the winning goal in the 67th minute.

== Recent history ==
Season	League	Pos.	Pl.	W	D	L	GS	GA	P	Cup	Notes
2006	3. divisjon	3	22	12	5	5	62	27	41	Second qualifying round	
2007	3. divisjon	2	22	15	3	2	72	22	48	Second round	
2008	3. divisjon	↑ 1	22	18	3	1	103	15	57	Second round	Promoted to the 2. divisjon
2009	2. divisjon	4	26	14	6	6	55	34	48	First round	
2010	2. divisjon	2	26	18	3	5	69	30	56	Second round	
2011	2. divisjon	9	26	10	8	8	55	38	38	Second round	
2012	2. divisjon	7	26	11	5	10	48	49	38	Second round	
2013	2. divisjon	2	26	17	6	3	62	26	57	Second round	
2014	2. divisjon	5	26	13	6	7	44	31	45	First round	
2015	2. divisjon	↑ 1	26	20	2	4	62	28	62	Second round	Promoted to the 1. divisjon
2016	1. divisjon	↓ 15	30	6	8	16	31	48	26	Third round	Relegated to 2. divisjon
2017	2. divisjon	7	26	10	4	12	43	39	34	Third round	
2018	2. divisjon	↑ 2	26	13	8	5	47	32	47	Third round	Promoted to the 1. divisjon
2019	1. divisjon	4	30	13	9	8	58	42	48	Quarter-final	
2020	1. divisjon	8	30	10	9	11	44	44	39	Cancelled	
2021	1. divisjon	5	30	12	8	10	46	45	44	Quarter-final	
2022	1. divisjon	4	30	15	7	8	61	48	52	Third round	
2023	1. divisjon	↑ 2	30	17	7	6	51	31	58	Fourth round	Promoted to the Eliteserien
2024	Eliteserien	8	30	9	10	11	35	36	37	Semi-final	
2025	Eliteserien	12	30	8	11	11	42	41	35	Quarter-final	
2026 (in progress)	Eliteserien	10	25	8	7	10	32	41	31	Semi-final	

== Players and staff ==
=== Current squad ===
As of 4 September 2026

Note: Flags indicate national team as defined under FIFA eligibility rules; some limited exceptions apply. Players may hold more than one non-FIFA nationality.

No.	Pos.	Nation	Player
1	GK	NOR	Emil Ødegaard
2	DF	NOR	Daniel Schneider
3	DF	NOR	Ayoub Aleesami
5	DF	NOR	Fredrik Berglie
6	MF	NOR	Jacob Blixt Flaten
7	MF	NOR	Robin Rasch (captain)
8	MF	NOR	Brage Tobiassen
9	MF	NOR	Martin Tangen Vinjor
10	FW	SOM	Bilal Njie
11	MF	NOR	Ola Visted (on loan from Viking)
13	DF	NOR	Brage Skaret
14	MF	NOR	Håkon Helland Hoseth
16	MF	NOR	Jonas Lange Hjorth
17	FW	NOR	Julian Gonstad
18	FW	NOR	Rasmus Eggen Vinge
19	DF	NOR	Eirik Saunes

No.	Pos.	Nation	Player
20	FW	NOR	Mostafa Najafzadeh
21	MF	NOR	Sander Sjøkvist
22	FW	PHI	Bjørn Martin Kristensen
23	FW	NOR	Magnus Wolff Eikrem
24	DF	NOR	Håkon Røsten
25	GK	NOR	Håvar Jenssen
27	MF	NOR	Tore André Sørås
28	FW	NOR	Magnus Grødem
29	FW	NOR	Isaiah Skovsgaard
30	MF	NOR	Marko Vučković
31	GK	NOR	Darian Weber Mink
32	MF	NGR	Samuel Tochukwu
33	DF	NOR	Amin Nouri
42	FW	NOR	David Hickson Gyedu
—	MF	NGR	Promise Meliga

For season transfers, see List of Norwegian football transfers winter 2025–26, and List of Norwegian football transfers summer 2026.

=== Out on loan ===
Note: Flags indicate national team as defined under FIFA eligibility rules; some limited exceptions apply. Players may hold more than one non-FIFA nationality.

No.	Pos.	Nation	Player
4	DF	GAM	Momodou Lion Njie (at Moss until 31 December 2026)
6	MF	GAM	Mansour Sinyan (at KÍ until 31 December 2026)
11	FW	SOM	Moussa Njie (at Moss until 31 December 2026)
15	DF	NOR	Magnus Kiperberg Mehl (at Tromsdalen until 31 December 2026)

=== Coaching staff ===
Position	Name
Head coach	Jørgen Isnes
Assistant coaches	Moa Danjani; Thomas Holm
Goalkeeper coach	Kamil Olsztyński
First team manager	Guttorm Lande
Team manager	Terje Granli
Academy manager	Erik Jonvik
Equipment manager	Dag Magelsen
Fitness coach	Gitte Madsen

=== Administrative staff ===
Position	Name
Administrative director	Thor-Erik Stenberg
Assistant director	Christoffer Dahl
Operations manager	Terje Andersen
Sports director	Daniel Fredheim Holm

== Futsal ==
KFUM-Kameratene Oslo Futsal is the futsal department of KFUM-Kameratene Oslo They won the Norwegian Futsal Premier League in 2009–10, after receiving silver medals in the inaugural season.
