= 2024 Hamarkameratene season =

HamKam
2024 season
- Chairman: Truls Nordby Johansen
- Head coach: Jakob Michelsen
- Stadium: Briskeby Stadion
- Eliteserien: 12th
- Norwegian Cup: Fourth round
- Top goalscorer: League: Moses Mawa (6); All: Moses Mawa; Niklas Ødegård; Gard Simenstad (6)
Home colours	Away colours

The 2024 season was Hamarkameratene's 126th season in existence and the club's third consecutive season in the top flight of Norwegian football. In addition to the domestic league, Hamarkameratene participating in this season's edition of the Norwegian Football Cup.

== Players ==
=== First team squad ===
As of 4 September 2023

Note: Flags indicate national team as defined under FIFA eligibility rules; some limited exceptions apply. Players may hold more than one non-FIFA nationality.

No.	Pos.	Nation	Player
1	GK	NOR	Sander Østraat
2	DF	NOR	Vegard Kongsro
4	DF	NOR	Halvor Rødølen Opsahl
6	DF	NOR	John Olav Norheim
7	MF	NOR	Kristian Lønstad Onsrud
8	MF	DEN	Oliver Kjærgaard
9	FW	NOR	Henrik Udahl
10	FW	NOR	Moses Mawa
11	MF	NOR	Tore André Sørås
12	GK	SWE	Marcus Sandberg
14	DF	NED	Luc Mares
15	MF	NOR	William Osnes-Ringen

No.	Pos.	Nation	Player
16	FW	NOR	Pål Alexander Kirkevold
17	MF	NOR	Niklas Ødegård (on loan from Molde)
18	DF	NOR	Gard Simenstad
19	MF	SWE	William Kurtovic
20	FW	NOR	Julian Gonstad
21	MF	ISL	Viðar Ari Jónsson
22	DF	NOR	Snorre Strand Nilsen
23	MF	NOR	Fredrik Sjølstad
24	MF	NOR	Arne Ødegård
25	MF	NOR	Jonas Dobloug Rasen
26	DF	ISL	Brynjar Ingi Bjarnason

== Transfers ==
=== Winter ===
In: Note: Flags indicate national team as defined under FIFA eligibility rules; some limited exceptions apply. Players may hold more than one non-FIFA nationality.

No.	Pos.	Nation	Player
1	GK	NOR	Sander Kaldråstøyl Østraat (from Haugesund)
14	DF	NED	Luc Mares (from Start)
15	MF	NOR	William Osnes-Ringen (from Vålerenga 2)
18	DF	NOR	Gard Simenstad (from Raufoss)
22	DF	NOR	Snorre Strand Nilsen (from Kristiansund)

Out: Note: Flags indicate national team as defined under FIFA eligibility rules; some limited exceptions apply. Players may hold more than one non-FIFA nationality.

No.	Pos.	Nation	Player
1	GK	NOR	Lars Jendal (to Sogndal)
3	DF	DEN	Jens Martin Gammelby (to (Denmark) Silkeborg)
5	DF	CAN	Julian Dunn (to (Canada) Halifax Wanderers)
9	FW	NOR	Jonas Enkerud (to (Finland) Gnistan)
15	FW	CIV	Ibrahim Romeo Olola (to (Albania) Lushnja)
18	MF	NOR	Morten Bjørlo (loan return to Rosenborg)
22	MF	USA	Kobe Hernandez-Foster (to (United States) Birmingham Legion)
27	DF	NOR	Amin Nouri (to KFUM)
28	GK	NOR	Petter Eichler Jensen (to Raufoss)
30	MF	CIV	Archange Mondouo (deceased)
33	DF	NOR	Aleksander Melgalvis (to Ridabu)

== Pre-season and friendlies ==
Win Draw Loss Fixtures

25 January 2024 Friendly	HamKam (Norway)	5–2	(Norway) Skeid	Lillestrøm
12:30 CET (UTC+1)	Kongsro 8'; Kirkevold 32' (pen.); Kjærgaard 35'; Unknown 59' (o.g.); Mawa 90'	Report	Ali Alzubi 53'; Shahid 73'	Stadium: LSK-Hallen; Attendance: 50; Referee: Stian Røvik Sletner

30 January 2024 Friendly	Raufoss (Norway)	1–2	(Norway) HamKam	Raufoss
11:00 CET (UTC+1)	Dunn 67' (o.g.)	Report	Kjærgaard 5'; Jónsson 17'	Stadium: Raufoss Storhall; Referee: Pål Riiser Berg

7 February 2024 Friendly	HamKam (Norway)	0–1	(Denmark) Fredericia	Antalya, Turkey
15:00 CET (UTC+1)		Report	Gammelgaard 22'

10 February 2024 Friendly	HamKam (Norway)	2–1	(Denmark) Lyngby	Antalya, Turkey
12:00 CET (UTC+1)	Onsrud 31'; Kirkevold 55'	Report	Romer 90' (pen.)

17 February 2024 Friendly	Aalborg (Denmark)	2–1	(Norway) HamKam	Aalborg, Denmark
13:30 CET (UTC+1)	Bakiz 44', 58'	Report	Nilsen 46'	Stadium: Gistrup Kunstgræsbane

23 February 2024 Friendly	HamKam (Norway)	0–4	(Norway) Fredrikstad	Lillestrøm
10:15 CET (UTC+1)		Report	Aukland 13'; Traoré 38'; Sørløkk 42'; Begby 89'	Stadium: LSK-Hallen; Referee: Mohammad Usman Aslam

5 March 2024 Friendly	HamKam (Norway)	3–1	(Norway) Kongsvinger	Marbella, Spain
16:00 CET (UTC+1)	Kirkevold 41' (pen.); Mawa 65', 90'	Report	Ravn-Haren 52'	Stadium: Marbella La Quinta; Referee: Marius Hansen Grøtta

10 March 2024 Friendly	Haugesund (Norway)	1–1	(Norway) HamKam	Marbella, Spain
14:00 CET (UTC+1)	Eskesen 58'	Report	Nilsen 75'	Stadium: Marbella La Quinta; Referee: Tore Hansen

13 March 2024 Friendly	HamKam (Norway)	4–2	(Norway) Strømmen	Ottestad
	Udahl 31', 52', 68'; Rasen 84'	Report	Sundberg 26'; Aasen 66'	Stadium: HIAS-Bana

16 March 2024 Friendly	HamKam (Norway)	0–0	(Norway) Sarpsborg 08	Ottestad
15:00 CET (UTC+1)		Report		Stadium: HIAS-Bana

23 March 2024 Friendly	Tromsø (Norway)	0–1	(Norway) HamKam	Tromsø
13:00 CET (UTC+1)		Report	Nilsen 35'	Stadium: Romssa Arena

== Competitions ==
=== Overview ===
Competition	First match	Last match	Starting round	Final position	Record							
Competition	First match	Last match	Starting round	Final position	Pld	W	D	L	GF	GA	GD	Win %
Eliteserien	2 April 2024	1 December 2024	Matchday 1	12th	30	8	9	13	34	39	−5	26.67
Norwegian Cup	10 April 2024	8 May 2024	First round	Fourth round	4	3	1	0	14	5	+9	75.00
Total					34	11	10	13	48	44	+4	32.35

Last updated: 1 December 2024
Source: Soccerway

=== Eliteserien ===
==== League table ====
Pos	Team	Pld	W	D	L	GF	GA	GD	Pts	Qualification or relegation
10	Sandefjord	30	9	7	14	41	46	−5	34	
11	Kristiansund	30	8	10	12	32	45	−13	34	
12	HamKam	30	8	9	13	34	39	−5	33	
13	Tromsø	30	9	6	15	34	44	−10	33	
14	Haugesund (O)	30	9	6	15	29	46	−17	33	Qualification for the relegation play-offs

Source: Football Association of Norway (in Norwegian)
Rules for classification: 1) Points; 2) Goal difference; 3) Goals scored; 4) Head-to-head points; 5) Head-to-head goal difference; 6) Head-to-head goals scored.
(O) Play-off winners

==== Results summary ====
Overall								Home						Away					
Pld	W	D	L	GF	GA	GD	Pts	W	D	L	GF	GA	GD	W	D	L	GF	GA	GD
30	8	9	13	34	39	−5	33	4	4	7	15	17	−2	4	5	6	19	22	−3

Last updated: 1 December 2024.

==== Results by round ====
Round	1	2	3	4	5	6	7	8	9	10	11	12	13	14	15	16	17	18	19	20	21	22	23	24	25	26	27	28	29	30
Ground	A	H	A	H	A	A	H	A	H	A	H	A	H	A	H	A	H	A	H	A	H	A	H	A	H	H	A	H	A	H
Result	D	L	L	L	D	D	D	W	W	L	L	W	D	W	L	L	D	W	W	L	D	L	W	D	L	W	D	L	L	L
Position	8	14	15	14	15	15	16	12	8	10	12	11	11	9	11	12	12	10	8	8	9	10	9	8	9	8	8	9	12	12

A = Away; H = Home; W = Win; D = Draw; L = Loss

==== Matches ====
The league fixtures were announced on 20 December 2023.

2 April 2024 1	KFUM Oslo	1–1	HamKam	Oslo
19:00 CEST (UTC+2)	Njie (yellow card) 86'; Dahl 90'	Report	Mawa 12'; Onsrud (yellow card) 29'; Kurtović (yellow card) 86'; Ødegård (yellow card) 86'	Stadium: Intility Arena; Attendance: 4,018; Referee: Mohammad Usman Aslam
Note: The match was played on Intility Arena due to the KFUM's home stadium KFUM Arena's undergoing renovation.

7 April 2024 2	HamKam	0–1	Molde	Hamar
17:00 CEST (UTC+2)		Report	Linnes (yellow card) 31'; Hagelskjær (yellow card) 36' (goal) 45'	Stadium: Briskeby Stadion; Attendance: 3,822; Referee: Svein Tore Sinnes

14 April 2024 3	Rosenborg	1–0	HamKam	Trondheim
17:00 CEST (UTC+2)	Selnæs 16'; Nemčík (yellow card) 47'; Nypan (yellow card) 87'	Report	Sørås (yellow card) 38'; Norheim (yellow card) 41' (yellow-red card) 80'; Mares (yellow card) 87'	Stadium: Lerkendal Stadion; Attendance: 11,278; Referee: Marius Hansen Grøtta

17 April 2024 16	Brann	1–0	HamKam	Bergen
17:00 CEST (UTC+2)	Heggebø 82'; Horneland (yellow card) 86'	Report	Ødegård (yellow card) 36'	Stadium: Brann Stadion; Attendance: 14,808; Referee: Marius Lien

21 April 2024 4	HamKam	0–1	Strømsgodset	Hamar
14:30 CEST (UTC+2)		Report	Taaje 43'; Melkersen (yellow card) 64'	Stadium: Briskeby Stadion; Attendance: 3,108; Referee: Kristoffer Hagenes

28 April 2024 5	Lillestrøm	1–1	HamKam	Lillestrøm
17:00 CEST (UTC+2)	Charles (yellow card) 5'; Vá 39' (red card) 45'; Knudtzon (yellow card) 45+4'	Report	Onsrud (yellow card) 24'; Ødegård 51'; Kjærgaard (yellow card) 71'	Stadium: Åråsen Stadion; Attendance: 6,190; Referee: Daniel Higraff

5 May 2024 6	Kristiansund	1–1	HamKam	Kristiansund
17:00 CEST (UTC+2)	Mikaelsson 29'; Willumsson (yellow card) 81'	Report	Mares 22' (pen.); Mawa (yellow card) 84'; Simenstad (yellow card) 86'	Stadium: Kristiansund Stadion; Attendance: 3,280; Referee: Tore Hansen

12 May 2024 7	HamKam	2–2	Haugesund	Hamar
17:00 CEST (UTC+2)	Ødegård 4'; Sjølstad (yellow card) 21'; Norheim 74'; Kongsro (yellow card) 90'	Report	Leite (yellow card) 43'; Bærtelsen (yellow card) 58'; Diarra 59'; Konradsen 61'	Stadium: Briskeby Stadion; Attendance: 3,011; Referee: Marius Lien

16 May 2024 8	Sarpsborg 08	1–7	HamKam	Sarpsborg
18:00 CEST (UTC+2)	Sher (yellow card) 62'; Chrupalla 65'; Casas (yellow card) 90'	Report	Onsrud 4', 28'; Norheim 17'; Jónsson 24'; Kurtovic (yellow card) 36'; Simenstad 39'; Udahl 76'; Kirkevold 87'	Stadium: Sarpsborg Stadion; Attendance: 6,154; Referee: Marius Hansen Grøtta

20 May 2024 9	HamKam	1–0	Bodø/Glimt	Hamar
17:00 CEST (UTC+2)	Simenstad 20'; Mares (yellow card) 51'; Kurtovic (yellow card) 61'; Norheim (yellow card) 73'	Report		Stadium: Briskeby Stadion; Attendance: 5,012; Referee: Rohit Saggi

26 May 2024 10	Viking	3–0	HamKam	Stavanger
17:00 CEST (UTC+2)	D’Agostino (yellow card) 9'; Auklend 16', 77'; Kvia-Egeskog 45+3'	Report		Stadium: SR-Bank Arena; Attendance: 10,024; Referee: Sigurd Smehus Kringstad

1 June 2024 11	HamKam	1–2	Brann	Hamar
18:00 CEST (UTC+2)	Kurtovic (yellow card) 9'; Mawa (yellow card) 11'; Simenstad 51'; Kjærgaard (yellow card) 90+5'	Report	Soltvedt 9' (pen.); Heltne Nilsen (yellow card) 29'; Crone (yellow card) 50'; Blomberg 74'; Kristiansen (yellow card) 85'; Sery Larsen (yellow card) 90+5'	Stadium: Briskeby Stadion; Attendance: 6,218; Referee: Mathias Støfringshaug

27 June 2024 12	Sandefjord	1–2	HamKam	Sandefjord
19:00 CEST (UTC+2)	Gjone (yellow card) 16'; Ottosson 41'; Cheng (yellow card) 90+7'	Report	Viðar 9'; Udahl 60' (pen.)	Stadium: Jotun Arena; Attendance: 3,241; Referee: Sivert Øksnes Amland

7 July 2024 13	HamKam	0–0	Tromsø	Hamar
17:00 CEST (UTC+2)	Mawa (yellow card) 27'; Sjølstad (red card) 69'	Report	Nordås (yellow card) 66'; Winther (yellow card) 90'; Guddal (yellow card) 90+7'	Stadium: Briskeby Stadion; Attendance: 4,406; Referee: Mohammad Usman Aslam

13 July 2024 14	Odd	1–2	HamKam	Skien
17:00 CEST (UTC+2)	Ingebrigtsen 29'; Ivančević (yellow card) 84'	Report	Norheim 24'; Viðar (yellow card) 31'; Sørås 63'	Stadium: Skagerak Arena; Attendance: 3,783; Referee: Sigurd Smehus Kringstad

21 July 2024 15	HamKam	0–1	Fredrikstad	Hamar
17:00 CEST (UTC+2)	Sørås (yellow card) 50'	Report	Molde 63'	Stadium: Briskeby Stadion; Attendance: 4,486; Referee: Daniel Higraff

4 August 2024 17	HamKam	3–3	Viking	Hamar
17:00 CEST (UTC+2)	Viðar (yellow card) 24'; Kirkevold (yellow card) 47'; Bjørshol 60' (o.g.); Langås 72' (o.g.); Brynjar Ingi 84'	Report	Tripić 26' (pen.); Austbø 66'; Østbø (yellow card) 85'; Svendsen 86'; Salvesen (yellow card) 87'	Stadium: Briskeby Stadion; Attendance: 3,504; Referee: Christian Moen

10 August 2024 18	Haugesund	0–1	HamKam	Haugesund
16:00 CEST (UTC+2)	Bizoza (yellow card) 64'; Tounekti (yellow card) 73'	Report	Mares (yellow card) 45+1'; Mawa 50'; Norheim (yellow card) 78'; Nilsen (yellow card) 90+5'	Stadium: Haugesund Sparebank Arena; Attendance: 3,678; Referee: Marius Hansen Grøtta

18 August 2024 19	HamKam	1–0	Odd	Hamar
17:00 CEST (UTC+2)	Sørås (yellow card) 53'; Mawa 62'; Sjølstad (red card) 68'; Onsrud (yellow card) 79'	Report		Stadium: Briskeby Stadion; Attendance: 4,209; Referee: Tore Hansen

25 August 2024 20	Molde	3–0	HamKam	Molde
17:00 CEST (UTC+2)	Haugan 22'; Posiadała (yellow card) 32'; Eriksen (yellow card) 61'; Eikrem 68', 73'	Report		Stadium: Aker Stadion; Attendance: 6,433; Referee: Ola Hobber Nilsen

1 September 2024 21	HamKam	1–1	Sandefjord	Hamar
17:00 CEST (UTC+2)	Kongsro 62'; Simenstad (yellow card) 89'	Report	Cheng (yellow card) 55'; Sigurðarson 69'; Kristiansen (yellow card) 72'	Stadium: Briskeby Stadion; Attendance: 4,316; Referee: Marius Lien

13 September 2024 22	Bodø/Glimt	3–0	HamKam	Bodø
19:00 CEST (UTC+2)	Høgh 54', 64'; Evjen 68'	Report	Ofkir (yellow card) 27'	Stadium: Aspmyra Stadion; Attendance: 5,879; Referee: Svein Tore Sinnes

21 September 2024 23	HamKam	5–0	Lillestrøm	Hamar
18:00 CEST (UTC+2)	Kongsro 11', 45+2'; Ofkir 16'; Mawa 33'; Sørås (yellow card) 73'; Brynjar Ingi 88'	Report	Elkær (yellow card) 24'; Diop (yellow card) 60'	Stadium: Briskeby Stadion; Attendance: 4,719; Referee: Mohammad Usman Aslam

29 September 2024 24	Strømsgodset	1–1	HamKam	Drammen
14:30 CEST (UTC+2)	Taaje (yellow card) 28'; Andersen 36'	Report	Brynjar Ingi (yellow card) 53'; Nilsen 88'	Stadium: Marienlyst Stadion; Attendance: 4,507; Referee: Espen Eskås

20 October 2024 25	HamKam	0–2	Sarpsborg 08	Hamar
17:00 CEST (UTC+2)	Sørås (yellow card) 42'	Report	Carstensen 6', 39'; Sher (yellow card) 45+2'; Wichne (yellow card) 72'	Stadium: Briskeby Stadion; Attendance: 4,155; Referee: Daniel Higraff

27 October 2024 26	HamKam	1–0	Kristiansund	Hamar
17:00 CET (UTC+1)	Ofkir (yellow card) 21': Sørås (yellow card) 86'; Udahl 90+6' (pen.) (yellow card) 90+7'	Report	Isaksen (yellow card) 66'; George (yellow card) 90+3'	Stadium: Briskeby Stadion; Attendance: 3,134; Referee: Svein Tore Sinnes

3 November 2024 27	Tromsø	3–3	HamKam	Tromsø
17:00 CET (UTC+1)	Erlien 29' (pen.), 67' (pen.); Nordås 51'; Skjærvik (yellow card) 75'; Paintsil (yellow card) 90+1'	Report	Mawa 22', 25'; Bjarnason (yellow card) 48'; Norheim 90+4'	Stadium: Romssa Arena; Attendance: 4,052; Referee: Marius Hansen Grøtta

10 November 2024 28	HamKam	0–2	Rosenborg	Hamar
17:00 CET (UTC+1)		Report	Sæter 3' (pen.); Broholm 6'; Zeidan (yellow card) 28'	Stadium: Briskeby Stadion; Attendance: 5,334; Referee: Sigurd Smehus Kringstad

23 November 2024 29	Fredrikstad	1–0	HamKam	Fredrikstad
17:00 CET (UTC+1)	Magnússon (yellow card) 64'; Johansen 79'	Report	Michelsen (yellow card) 51'; Simenstad (yellow card) 64'; Norheim (yellow card) 90+3'	Stadium: Fredrikstad Stadion; Attendance: 5,578; Referee: Mohammad Usman Aslam

1 December 2024 30	HamKam	0–2	KFUM Oslo	Hamar
17:00 CET (UTC+1)	Sjølstad (yellow card) 16'; Sørås (yellow card) 23'; Mares (red card) 55'; Kirkevold (yellow card) 76'; Bjarnason (yellow card) 90'	Report	Hestnes 24'; Hoseth 49'	Stadium: Briskeby Stadion; Attendance: 2,508; Referee: Sivert Øksnes Amland

=== Norwegian Football Cup ===
10 April 2024 First round	Ridabu	0–5	HamKam	Ridabu
18:00 CEST (UTC+2)		Report	Udahl 27' (pen.); Jónsson 35'; Norheim 57'; Ødegård 58'; Simenstad 72'	Stadium: Black River Park kunstgress Attendance: 1,462; Referee: Haakon Arve Pedersen Bue

24 April 2024 Second round	Elverum	2–4	HamKam	Elverum
18:00 CEST (UTC+2)	Dadras 10'; Høiby (yellow card) 48'; Alhajjar 82'; Olsen (yellow card) 89'	Report	Kjærgaard 20'; Ødegård 25', 35'; Kirkevold 78'	Stadium: Elverum Stadion; Attendance: 743; Referee: Stian Røvig Sletner

1 May 2024 Third round	Egersund	1–3	HamKam	Egersund
14:30 CEST (UTC+2)	Elvevold 33'; Dia (red card) 43'	Report	Ødegård 13'; Mares 41' (pen.); Udahl 54'	Stadium: Idrettsparken; Attendance: 1,125; Referee: Svein Tore Sinnes

8 May 2024 Fourth round	Vålerenga	2–2 (a.e.t.) (4–3 p)	HamKam	Oslo
18:00 CEST (UTC+2)	Hagen 5'; Riisnæs 23' (yellow card) 64'; Bjørdal (yellow card) 27'; Rijks (yellow card) 87'; Hammer Kjelsen (yellow card) 90+1'; Borchgrevink (yellow card) 120'	Report	Kiil Olsen 53' (o.g.); Kurtovic (yellow card) 54'; Kirkevold (yellow card) 82'; Simenstad 90+4' (yellow card) 119'	Stadium: Intility Arena; Attendance: 7,042; Referee: Kristoffer Hagenes
	Penalties
	Kreuzriegler (penalty missed); Kamara (penalty scored); Hedenstad (penalty scored); Kiil Olsen (penalty missed); Borchgrevink (penalty scored); Ambina (penalty scored)		(penalty missed) Mares; (penalty scored) Simenstad; (penalty missed) Gonstad; (penalty scored) Kirkevold; (penalty scored) Jónsson; (penalty missed) Norheim
