= 2023 Hamarkameratene season =

HamKam
2023 season
- Chairman: Truls Nordby Johansen
- Head coach: Jakob Michelsen
- Stadium: Briskeby Stadion
- Eliteserien: 11th
- Norwegian Cup: Quarter-finals
- Top goalscorer: League: Henrik Udahl (7); All: Henrik Udahl (10)
Home colours	Away colours

The 2023 season was Hamarkameratene's 125th season in existence and the club's second consecutive season in the top flight of Norwegian football. In addition to the domestic league, Hamarkameratene participated in this season's edition of the Norwegian Football Cup.

== Players ==
=== First team squad ===
As of 4 September 2023

Note: Flags indicate national team as defined under FIFA eligibility rules; some limited exceptions apply. Players may hold more than one non-FIFA nationality.

No.	Pos.	Nation	Player
1	GK	NOR	Lars Jendal
2	DF	NOR	Vegard Kongsro
3	DF	DEN	Jens Martin Gammelby
4	DF	NOR	Halvor Rødølen Opsahl
5	DF	CAN	Julian Dunn
6	DF	NOR	John Olav Norheim
7	MF	NOR	Kristian Lønstad Onsrud
8	MF	DEN	Oliver Kjærgaard
9	FW	NOR	Jonas Enkerud
10	FW	NOR	Moses Mawa
11	MF	NOR	Tore André Sørås
12	GK	SWE	Marcus Sandberg
14	FW	NOR	Henrik Udahl
15	FW	CIV	Ibrahim Romeo Olola

No.	Pos.	Nation	Player
16	FW	NOR	Pål Alexander Kirkevold
17	MF	NOR	Morten Bjørlo (on loan from Rosenborg)
18	MF	NOR	Enok Naustdal
19	MF	SWE	William Kurtovic
20	FW	NOR	Julian Gonstad
21	MF	ISL	Viðar Ari Jónsson
22	DF	GUA	Kobe Hernandez-Foster
23	MF	NOR	Fredrik Sjølstad
24	MF	NOR	Arne Ødegård
25	MF	NOR	Jonas Dobloug Rasen
26	DF	ISL	Brynjar Ingi Bjarnason
27	DF	NOR	Amin Nouri
28	GK	NOR	Petter Eichler Jensen
33	DF	NOR	Aleksander Melgalvis Andreassen

== Transfers ==
=== Winter ===
In: Note: Flags indicate national team as defined under FIFA eligibility rules; some limited exceptions apply. Players may hold more than one non-FIFA nationality.

No.	Pos.	Nation	Player
3	DF	DEN	Jens Martin Gammelby (from (Denmark) Brøndby)
4	DF	NOR	John Olav Norheim (from Jerv)
8	MF	DEN	Oliver Kjærgaard (from (Denmark) Helsingør)
11	MF	NOR	Tore André Sørås (from KFUM)
12	GK	SWE	Marcus Sandberg (from Stabæk)
14	FW	NOR	Henrik Udahl (from Vålerenga)
17	FW	SWE	Rasmus Wiedesheim-Paul (on loan from Rosenborg)
19	MF	SWE	William Kurtovic (from Sandefjord)
24	MF	NOR	Arne Hopland Ødegård (promoted from junior squad)
25	MF	NOR	Jonas Dobloug Rasen (promoted from junior squad)
26	DF	ISL	Brynjar Ingi Bjarnason (from Vålerenga)
28	GK	NOR	Petter Eichler Jensen (promoted from junior squad, previously on loan at Lillehammer)
30	MF	CIV	Archange Mondouo (from (Ivory Coast) Tito FC Gbolouville)

Out: Note: Flags indicate national team as defined under FIFA eligibility rules; some limited exceptions apply. Players may hold more than one non-FIFA nationality.

No.	Pos.	Nation	Player
3	DF	CRC	Fernán Faerrón (loan return to (Costa Rica) Desamparados)
6	DF	NOR	Markus Nakkim (to (United States) Orange County)
8	DF	NOR	Vetle Skjærvik (to Lillestrøm)
10	MF	NOR	Emil Sildnes (to Åsane)
11	MF	NOR	Morten Bjørlo (to Rosenborg)
12	MF	CAN	Clément Bayiha (to (Canada) York United)
17	FW	DEN	Victor Lind (loan return to (Denmark) Midtjylland)
19	FW	NOR	Marcus Pedersen (to Løten)
58	DF	TUR	Hasan Kurucay (to (Germany) Eintracht Braunschweig)
73	MF	LAT	Eduards Dašķevičs (to (Latvia) Riga)
77	FW	UKR	Yuriy Yakovenko (released)
91	MF	NGR	Rilwan Hassan (to (Indonesia) Sreenidi Deccan)

=== Summer ===
In: Note: Flags indicate national team as defined under FIFA eligibility rules; some limited exceptions apply. Players may hold more than one non-FIFA nationality.

No.	Pos.	Nation	Player
10	FW	NOR	Moses Mawa (from Kristiansund)
15		CIV	Ibrahim Romeo Olola (from (Ivory Coast) CO Monajoce)
18	MF	NOR	Morten Bjørlo (on loan from Rosenborg)
21	FW	ISL	Viðar Ari Jónsson (from (Iceland) FH)

Out: Note: Flags indicate national team as defined under FIFA eligibility rules; some limited exceptions apply. Players may hold more than one non-FIFA nationality.

No.	Pos.	Nation	Player
17	FW	SWE	Rasmus Wiedesheim-Paul (loan return to Rosenborg)
21	MF	NOR	Benjamin Faraas (to (Belgium) Club NXT)
96	GK	GUA	Nicholas Hagen (to (Israel) Bnei Sakhnin)

== Pre-season and friendlies ==
Win Draw Loss Fixtures

18 March 2023 Friendly	Eidsvold (Norway)	1–2	(Norway) HamKam	Eidsvoll
14:00 CET (UTC+1)				Stadium: Eidsvoll Kunstgress

21 March 2023 Friendly	Raufoss (Norway)	3–0	(Norway) HamKam	Raufoss
19:00 CET (UTC+1)				Stadium: Raufoss Storhall

2 April 2023 Friendly	Tromsø (Norway)	1–0	(Norway) HamKam	Tromsø
13:00 CEST (UTC+2)				Stadium: Romssa Arena

== Competitions ==
=== Overview ===
Competition	First match	Last match	Starting round	Final position	Record							
Competition	First match	Last match	Starting round	Final position	Pld	W	D	L	GF	GA	GD	Win %
Eliteserien	10 April 2023	3 December 2023	Matchday 1	11th	30	10	4	16	39	59	−20	33.33
Norwegian Cup	24 May 2023	13 July 2023	First round	Quarter-finals	5	4	0	1	21	3	+18	80.00
Total					35	14	4	17	60	62	−2	40.00

Source: Soccerway

=== Eliteserien ===
==== League table ====
Pos	Team	Pld	W	D	L	GF	GA	GD	Pts
9	Rosenborg	30	11	6	13	46	50	−4	39
10	Odd	30	10	8	12	42	44	−2	38
11	HamKam	30	10	4	16	39	59	−20	34
12	Haugesund	30	9	6	15	34	40	−6	33
13	Sandefjord	30	8	7	15	47	55	−8	31

Source: Football Association of Norway (in Norwegian)
Rules for classification: 1) Points; 2) Goal difference; 3) Goals scored; 4) Head-to-head points; 5) Head-to-head goal difference; 6) Head-to-head goals scored.

==== Results summary ====
Overall								Home						Away					
Pld	W	D	L	GF	GA	GD	Pts	W	D	L	GF	GA	GD	W	D	L	GF	GA	GD
30	10	4	16	39	59	−20	34	6	3	6	21	22	−1	4	1	10	18	37	−19

==== Results by round ====
Round	1	2	3	4	5	6	7	8	9	10	11	12	13	14	15	16	17	18	19	20	21	22	23	24	25	26	27	28	29	30
Ground	H	A	H	A	H	H	A	H	A	A	H	A	H	A	H	A	H	A	H	A	H	A	H	A	H	A	H	A	H	A
Result	W	L	W	L	L	L	L	D	L	L	L	L	W	W	W	L	L	W	W	L	D	L	D	W	L	L	W	W	L	D
Position	2	5	2	9	12	14	15	13	15	15	15	16	15	14	13	13	15	12	11	11	11	12	12	11	12	12	12	11	11	11

A = Away; H = Home; W = Win; D = Draw; L = Loss

==== Matches ====
The league fixtures were announced on 9 December 2022.

10 April 2023 1	HamKam	2–0	Sandefjord	Hamar
17:00 CEST (UTC+2)	Udahl 29' (pen.), 45+3'	Report		Stadium: Briskeby Stadion; Attendance: 3,715; Referee: Sivert Amland

16 April 2023 2	Haugesund	3–2	HamKam	Haugesund
17:00 CEST (UTC+2)	Sande 45'; Diarra 49' (pen.); Krusnell 89'	Report	Faraas 84'; Wiedesheim-Paul 90+2'	Stadium: Haugesund Stadion; Attendance: 7,239; Referee: Svein Tore Sinnes

23 April 2023 3	HamKam	2–0	Strømsgodset	Hamar
17:00 CEST (UTC+2)	Udahl 75'; Kirkevold 89'	Report		Stadium: Briskeby Stadion; Attendance: 3,289; Referee: Steinar Hauge

30 April 2023 4	Viking	7–3	HamKam	Stavanger
17:00 CEST (UTC+2)	D'Agostino 48'; Svendsen 50'; Bjørshol 61'; Salvesen 69'; Pattynama 72'; Tripić 78' (pen.); Tangen 85'	Report	Kirkevold 23'; Norheim 74'; Andreassen 83'	Stadium: Viking Stadion; Attendance: 9,932; Referee: Marius Hansen Grøtta

7 May 2023 5	HamKam	0–4	Molde	Hamar
17:00 CEST (UTC+2)		Report	Bjarnason 7' (o.g.); Eikrem 53'; Eriksen 56'; Mannsverk 61' (pen.)	Stadium: Briskeby Stadion; Attendance: 4,518; Referee: Marius Lien

13 May 2023 6	HamKam	1–2	Tromsø	Hamar
17:00 CEST (UTC+2)	Melgalvis 72' (pen.)	Report	Bassi 45'; Vesterlund 90+11' (pen.)	Stadium: Briskeby Stadion; Attendance: 3,315; Referee: Ajdin Medic

16 May 2023 7	Vålerenga	3–0	HamKam	Oslo
18:00 CEST (UTC+2)	Jatta 18'; Håkans 24'; Bjørdal 45+2'	Report		Stadium: Intility Arena; Attendance: 13,752; Referee: Mohammad Usman Aslam

29 May 2023 8	HamKam	0–0	Lillestrøm	Hamar
19:15 CEST (UTC+2)		Report		Stadium: Briskeby Stadion; Attendance: 3,695; Referee: Daniel Higraff

4 June 2023 9	Rosenborg	4–0	HamKam	Trondheim
17:00 CEST (UTC+2)	Skarsem 18', 71'; Aga 52'; Nelson 56'	Report		Stadium: Lerkendal Stadion; Attendance: 10,704; Referee: Espen Eskås

11 June 2023 10	Bodø/Glimt	3–0	HamKam	Bodø
17:00 CEST (UTC+2)	Pellegrino 64', 67'; Vetlesen 79'	Report		Stadium: Aspmyra Stadion; Attendance: 6,291; Referee: Steinar Hauge

25 June 2023 11	HamKam	0–1	Odd	Hamar
17:00 CEST (UTC+2)		Report	Hien 83'	Stadium: Briskeby Stadion; Attendance: 4,037; Referee: Kristoffer Hagenes

2 July 2023 12	Brann	2–1	HamKam	Bergen
17:00 CEST (UTC+2)	Torsvik 45+2'; Finne 83' (pen.)	Report	Kirkevold 90+3'	Stadium: Brann Stadion; Attendance: 14,542; Referee: Svein Oddvar Moen

7 July 2023 13	HamKam	2–1	Aalesund	Hamar
19:00 CEST (UTC+2)	Udahl 66'; Opsahl 80'	Report	Karlsbakk 71'	Stadium: Briskeby Stadion; Attendance: 3,244; Referee: Christian Moen

16 July 2023 14	Sarpsborg 08	2–3	HamKam	Sarpsborg
17:00 CEST (UTC+2)	Ngouali 16'; Lundqvist 24'	Report	Udahl 8' (pen.); Norheim 36'; Onsrud 38'	Stadium: Sarpsborg Stadion; Attendance: 4,169; Referee: Jan Morten Tennøy

23 July 2023 15	HamKam	3–2	Stabæk	Hamar
17:00 CEST (UTC+2)	Kirkevold 32'; Onsrud 49'; Gammelby 90+4'	Report	Bakenga 51', 77'	Stadium: Briskeby Stadion; Attendance: 3,576; Referee: Sigurd Smehus Kringstad

30 July 2023 16	Lillestrøm	3–1	HamKam	Lillestrøm
17:00 CEST (UTC+2)	Åsen 23'; Dragsnes 36'Skogvold 83' (pen.)	Report	Udahl 35'	Stadium: Åråsen Stadion; Attendance: 6,790; Referee: Daniel Higraff

6 August 2023 17	HamKam	0–2	Brann	Hamar
17:00 CEST (UTC+2)		Report	Kartum 22'; Castro 23'	Stadium: Briskeby Stadion; Attendance: 5,346; Referee: Mohammad Usman Aslam

13 August 2023 18	Aalesund	0–2	HamKam	Ålesund
17:00 CEST (UTC+2)		Report	Kirkevold 39', 47'	Stadium: Color Line Stadion; Attendance: 5,864; Referee: Espen Eskås

20 August 2023 19	HamKam	3–0	Rosenborg	Hamar
17:00 CEST (UTC+2)	Yttergård Jenssen 15' (o.g.); Onsrud 43'; Kongsro 82'	Report	Þorvaldsson (yellow card) 59'	Stadium: Briskeby Stadion; Attendance: 6,500; Referee: Steinar Hauge

3 September 2023 21	HamKam	4–4	Bodø/Glimt	Hamar
19:15 CEST (UTC+2)	Haikin 1' (o.g.); Gammelby 25'; Bjarnason 74'; Onsrud 71'	Report	Pellegrino 49', 61'; Berg 66', 68'	Stadium: Briskeby Stadion; Attendance: 4,532; Referee: Sigurd Smehus Kringstad

17 September 2023 22	Tromsø	2–1	HamKam	Tromsø
17:00 CEST (UTC+2)	Opsahl 33'; Yttergård Jenssen 38'	Report	Kjærgaard 53'	Stadium: Romssa Arena; Attendance: 4,790; Referee: Jan Morten Tennøy

24 September 2023 23	HamKam	1–1	Sarpsborg 08	Hamar
17:00 CEST (UTC+2)	Mawa 50'	Report	Victor Torp Overgaard 17'	Stadium: Briskeby Stadion; Attendance: 3,522; Referee: Kai Erik Steen

4 October 2023 20	Stabæk	5–2	HamKam	Bærum
19:00 CEST (UTC+2)	Walstad 16'; Bakenga 30', 52'; Næss 58'; Edwards 66'	Report	Norheim 44'; Bjørlo 82'	Stadium: Nadderud Stadion; Attendance: 2,710; Referee: Daniel Higraff

8 October 2023 24	Sandefjord	0–1	HamKam	Sandefjord
17:00 CEST (UTC+2)		Report	Udahl 61' (pen.)	Stadium: Release Arena; Attendance: 2,689; Referee: Rohit Saggi

22 October 2023 25	HamKam	0–3	Haugesund	Hamar
17:00 CEST (UTC+2)		Report	Therkildsen 30'; Eskesen 88'; Søderlund 90+5'	Stadium: Briskeby Stadion; Attendance: 4,011; Referee: Marius Hansen Grøtta

29 October 2023 26	Odd	2–0	HamKam	Skien
17:00 CET (UTC+1)	Baccay 2'; Jørgensen 48'	Report		Stadium: Skagerak Arena; Attendance: 4,261; Referee: Mohammad Usman Aslam

4 November 2023 27	HamKam	3–0	Viking	Hamar
18:00 CET (UTC+1)	Mawa 63'; Kjærgaard 66'; Enkerud 90+6'	Report		Stadium: Briskeby Stadion; Attendance: 2,945; Referee: Ola Hobber Nilsen

12 November 2023 28	Strømsgodset	0–1	HamKam	Drammen
17:00 CET (UTC+1)		Report	Tómasson 49' (o.g.)	Stadium: Marienlyst stadion Attendance: 4,385; Referee: Sigurd Smehus Kringstad

26 November 2023 29	HamKam	0–2	Vålerenga	Hamar
17:00 CET (UTC+1)		Report	Ilić 82'; Håkans 90+4'	Stadium: Briskeby Stadion; Attendance: 6,321; Referee: Kai Erik Steen

2 December 2023 30	Molde	1–1	HamKam	Molde
17:00 CET (UTC+1)	Grødem 90+2' (pen.)	Report	Jónsson 28'	Stadium: Aker Stadion; Attendance: 5,431; Referee: Jan Morten Tennøy

=== Norwegian Football Cup ===
24 May 2023 First round	Nybergsund	0–5	HamKam	Nybergsund
18:00 CEST (UTC+2)		Report	Udahl 22', 23', 50'; Wiedesheim-Paul 35'; Sjølstad 44'	Stadium: Nybergsund Stadion; Attendance: 472; Referee: Johan William Grundt

1 June 2023 Second round	Mjølner	0–8	HamKam	Narvik
18:00 CEST (UTC+2)		Report	Faraas 23', 52', 63', 82'; Enkerud 54', 90'; Wiedesheim-Paul 77', 89'	Stadium: Narvik kunstgress Attendance: 450; Referee: Stian Røvig Sletner

7 June 2023 Third round	Bærum	1–3 (a.e.t.)	HamKam	Sandvika
19:00 CEST (UTC+2)	Dacic 65'	Report	Kirkevold 82'; Enkerud 92'; Gammelby 120'	Stadium: AJ Arena; Attendance: 479; Referee: Marius Lien

28 June 2023 Fourth round	Gjøvik-Lyn	0–5	HamKam	Gjøvik
18:00 CEST (UTC+2)		Report	Wiedesheim-Paul 35', 72'; Bjarnason 44'; Kjærgaard 47'; Enkerud 76'	Stadium: Gjøvik Stadion; Attendance: 1,962; Referee: Daniel Higraff

13 July 2023 Quarter-finals	HamKam	0–2	Bodø/Glimt	Hamar
18:00 CEST (UTC+2)		Report	Grønbæk 55'; Berg 76'	Stadium: Briskeby Stadion; Attendance: 3,861; Referee: Tore Hansen
