= 2022 Hamarkameratene season =

HamKam
2022 season
- Chairman: Truls Nordby Johansen
- Head coach: Jakob Michelsen
- Stadium: Briskeby Stadion
- Eliteserien: 13th
- Norwegian Cup: Third round
- Top goalscorer: League: Five players (4); All: Jonas Enkerud (7)
| Home colours | Away colours |

The 2023 season was Hamarkameratene's 124th season in existence and the club's first season return in the top flight of Norwegian football. In addition to the domestic league, Hamarkameratene participated in this season's edition of the Norwegian Football Cup.

== Players ==
=== First team squad ===
As of 13 April 2022

Note: Flags indicate national team as defined under FIFA eligibility rules; some limited exceptions apply. Players may hold more than one non-FIFA nationality.

| No. | Pos. | Nation | Player |
|---|---|---|---|
| 1 | GK | NOR | Lars Jendal |
| 2 | DF | NOR | Vegard Kongsro |
| 3 | DF | CRC | Fernán Faerrón (on loan from Desamparados) |
| 4 | DF | NOR | Amin Nouri |
| 5 | DF | CAN | Julian Dunn |
| 6 | DF | NOR | Markus Nakkim |
| 7 | MF | NOR | Kristian Lønstad Onsrud |
| 8 | DF | NOR | Vetle Skjærvik |
| 9 | FW | NOR | Jonas Enkerud |
| 10 | MF | NOR | Emil Sildnes |
| 11 | MF | NOR | Morten Bjørlo |
| 12 | DF | CAN | Clément Bayiha |
| 14 | DF | NOR | Halvor Rødølen Opsahl |
| 15 | DF | NOR | Thorbjørn Kristiansen |

| No. | Pos. | Nation | Player |
|---|---|---|---|
| 16 | FW | NOR | Pål Alexander Kirkevold |
| 17 | FW | DEN | Victor Lind (on loan from Midtjylland) |
| 19 | FW | NOR | Marcus Pedersen |
| 20 | FW | NOR | Julian Gonstad |
| 21 | MF | NOR | Benjamin Thoresen Faraas |
| 22 | DF | USA | Kobe Hernandez-Foster |
| 23 | MF | NOR | Fredrik Sjølstad |
| 33 | DF | NOR | Aleksander Melgalvis Andreassen |
| 58 | DF | TUR | Hasan Kuruçay |
| 73 | MF | LAT | Eduards Dašķevičs |
| 91 | MF | NGR | Rilwan Olanrewaju Hassan |
| 96 | GK | GUA | Nicholas Hagen |

== Transfers ==
=== Winter ===
In: Note: Flags indicate national team as defined under FIFA eligibility rules; some limited exceptions apply. Players may hold more than one non-FIFA nationality.

| No. | Pos. | Nation | Player |
|---|---|---|---|
| 1 | GK | NOR | Lars Jendal (loan return from Arendal) |
| 2 | DF | NOR | Vegard Kongsro (from Bodø/Glimt) |
| 3 | DF | CRC | Fernán Faerrón (on loan from (Costa Rica) Desamparados) |
| 4 | DF | USA | Sam Rogers (from (United States) OKC Energy, previously on loan) |
| 4 | DF | NOR | Amin Nouri (from Sogndal) |
| 5 | DF | CAN | Julian Dunn (from (Canada) Toronto) |
| 12 | DF | CAN | Clément Bayiha (from (Canada) CF Montréal) |
| 16 | FW | NOR | Pål Alexander Kirkevold (from Stabæk) |
| 19 | MF | DEN | Oliver Sørensen (on loan from (Denmark) Midtjylland) |
| 22 | DF | USA | Kobe Hernandez-Foster (from (Germany) Wolfsburg U19) |
| 23 | MF | NOR | Fredrik Sjølstad (from Molde) |
| 77 | FW | UKR | Yuriy Yakovenko (from (Denmark) Esbjerg) |

Out: Note: Flags indicate national team as defined under FIFA eligibility rules; some limited exceptions apply. Players may hold more than one non-FIFA nationality.

| No. | Pos. | Nation | Player |
|---|---|---|---|
| 4 | DF | USA | Sam Rogers (to Rosenborg) |
| 5 | DF | NOR | Steinar Strømnes (retired) |
| 12 | GK | POL | Łukasz Jarosiński (retired) |
| 18 | MF | NOR | Niklas Rekdal (to Brattvåg) |
| 22 | DF | SWE | Rasmus Lindkvist (to (Sweden) GIF Sundsvall) |
| 23 | FW | CAN | Theo Bair (loan return to (Canada) Vancouver Whitecaps) |
| 25 | DF | NOR | Davod Arzani (to Asker) |
| 53 | FW | SWE | Albert Berisha (to Eidsvold Turn) |
| — | MF | NOR | Van Zan Lian Bawi Hrin (to Lillehammer, previously on loan at Elverum) |
| — | MF | NOR | Erik Olaf Krohnstad (to Lysekloster, previously on loan) |
| — | FW | NOR | Jarmund Øyen Kvernstuen (to Ull/Kisa, previously on loan at Bærum) |

=== Summer ===
In: Note: Flags indicate national team as defined under FIFA eligibility rules; some limited exceptions apply. Players may hold more than one non-FIFA nationality.

| No. | Pos. | Nation | Player |
|---|---|---|---|
| 17 | FW | DEN | Victor Lind (on loan from (Denmark) Midtjylland) |
| 18 | MF | NOR | Enok Naustdal (from Florø) |
| 19 | FW | NOR | Marcus Pedersen (free transfer) |
| 91 | MF | NGR | Rilwan Hassan (from (Denmark) SønderjyskE) |

Out: Note: Flags indicate national team as defined under FIFA eligibility rules; some limited exceptions apply. Players may hold more than one non-FIFA nationality.

| No. | Pos. | Nation | Player |
|---|---|---|---|
| 6 | MF | NOR | Kristian Eriksen (to Molde) |
| 17 | FW | NGR | Jibril Antala Abubakar (released) |
| 19 | MF | DEN | Oliver Sørensen (loan return to (Denmark) FC Midtjylland) |

== Competitions ==
=== Overview ===
| Competition | First match | Last match | Starting round | Final position | Record | | | | | | | |
| Competition | First match | Last match | Starting round | Final position | Pld | W | D | L | GF | GA | GD | Win % |
|---|---|---|---|---|---|---|---|---|---|---|---|---|
| Eliteserien | 12 April 2022 | 13 November 2022 | Matchday 1 | 13th | 30 | 6 | 13 | 11 | 33 | 43 | −10 | 20.00 |
| Norwegian Cup | 19 May 2022 | 17 August 2022 | First round | Third round | 4 | 2 | 1 | 1 | 10 | 1 | +9 | 50.00 |
| Total | | | | | 34 | 8 | 14 | 12 | 43 | 44 | −1 | 23.53 |

Last updated: 13 November 2022
Source: Soccerway

=== Eliteserien ===
==== League table ====
| Pos | Team | Pld | W | D | L | GF | GA | GD | Pts | Qualification or relegation |
|---|---|---|---|---|---|---|---|---|---|---|
| 11 | Viking | 30 | 9 | 8 | 13 | 48 | 54 | −6 | 35 | |
| 12 | Strømsgodset | 30 | 9 | 6 | 15 | 44 | 55 | −11 | 33 | |
| 13 | HamKam | 30 | 6 | 13 | 11 | 33 | 43 | −10 | 31 | |
| 14 | Sandefjord (O) | 30 | 6 | 6 | 18 | 42 | 68 | −26 | 24 | Qualification for the relegation play-offs |
| 15 | Kristiansund (R) | 30 | 5 | 8 | 17 | 37 | 60 | −23 | 23 | Relegation to First Division |

Source: Football Association of Norway (in Norwegian)
Rules for classification: 1) Points; 2) Goal difference; 3) Goals scored; 4) Head-to-head points; 5) Head-to-head goal difference; 6) Head-to-head goals scored.
(O) Play-off winners; (R) Relegated

==== Results summary ====
| Overall | | | | | | | | Home | | | | | | Away | | | | | |
| Pld | W | D | L | GF | GA | GD | Pts | W | D | L | GF | GA | GD | W | D | L | GF | GA | GD |
|---|---|---|---|---|---|---|---|---|---|---|---|---|---|---|---|---|---|---|---|
| 30 | 6 | 13 | 11 | 33 | 43 | −10 | 31 | 4 | 6 | 5 | 17 | 17 | 0 | 2 | 7 | 6 | 16 | 26 | −10 |

Last updated: 13 November 2022.

==== Results by round ====
| Round | 1 | 2 | 3 | 4 | 5 | 6 | 7 | 8 | 9 | 10 | 11 | 12 | 13 | 14 | 15 | 16 | 17 | 18 | 19 | 20 | 21 | 22 | 23 | 24 | 25 | 26 | 27 | 28 | 29 | 30 |
|---|---|---|---|---|---|---|---|---|---|---|---|---|---|---|---|---|---|---|---|---|---|---|---|---|---|---|---|---|---|---|
| Ground | H | A | H | A | H | A | H | A | H | A | H | H | A | H | A | H | A | H | A | H | A | H | A | H | A | A | H | A | H | A |
| Result | D | L | W | D | D | D | D | D | L | W | W | D | D | L | D | L | L | D | D | W | L | L | L | W | L | D | D | W | L | L |
| Position | 7 | 13 | 8 | 12 | 9 | 10 | 11 | 10 | 12 | 10 | 10 | 10 | 10 | 11 | 12 | 13 | 14 | 13 | 13 | 10 | 12 | 13 | 13 | 13 | 13 | 13 | 13 | 13 | 13 | 13 |

A = Away; H = Home; W = Win; D = Draw; L = Loss

==== Matches ====
| 2 April 2022 1 | HamKam | 2–2 | Lillestrøm | Hamar |
| 16:00 CEST (UTC+2) | Eriksen 11'; Enkerud 21' | Report | Edh 65'; Adams 70' | Stadium: Briskeby Stadion; Attendance: 6,500; Referee: Tore Hansen |

| 10 April 2022 2 | Tromsø | 2–1 | HamKam | Tromsø |
| 18:00 CEST (UTC+2) | Psyché 10'; Opsahl 51' | Report | Kirkevold 13' | Stadium: Alfheim Stadion; Attendance: 2,181; Referee: Marius Hansen Grøtta |

| 18 April 2022 3 | HamKam | 3–0 | Sandefjord | Hamar |
| 18:00 CEST (UTC+2) | Kongsro 42'; Kuruçay 77'; Enkerud 81' | Report | | Stadium: Briskeby Stadion; Attendance: 3,597; Referee: Svein Tore Sinnes |

| 24 April 2022 4 | Kristiansund | 2–2 | HamKam | Kristiansund |
| 18:00 CEST (UTC+2) | Gjertsen 17'; Nilsen 63' | Report | Kuruçay 44'; Yakovenko 85' | Stadium: Kristiansund Stadion; Attendance: 3,827; Referee: Mohammad Usman Aslam |

| 8 May 2022 5 | HamKam | 0–0 | Aalesund | Hamar |
| 20:00 CEST (UTC+2) | | Report | | Stadium: Briskeby Stadion; Attendance: 3,037; Referee: Kai Erik Steen |

| 16 May 2022 6 | Vålerenga | 1–1 | HamKam | Oslo |
| 20:00 CEST (UTC+2) | Zuta 75' | Report | Enkerud 56' | Stadium: Intility Arena; Attendance: 14,357; Referee: Sivert Øksnes Amland |

| 22 May 2022 7 | HamKam | 1–1 | Rosenborg | Hamar |
| 20:00 CEST (UTC+2) | Eriksen 69' | Report | Rogers 25' | Stadium: Briskeby Stadion; Attendance: 6,904; Referee: Kristoffer Hagenes |

| 25 May 2022 8 | Viking | 1–1 | HamKam | Stavanger |
| 18:00 CEST (UTC+2) | Sandberg 10' | Report | Solbakken 64' (o.g.) | Stadium: Viking Stadion; Attendance: 8,543; Referee: Marius Lien |

| 28 May 2022 9 | HamKam | 1–2 | Odd | Hamar |
| 16:00 CEST (UTC+2) | Kongsro 46' | Report | Jevtović 24' (pen.); Lauritsen 28' | Stadium: Briskeby Stadion; Attendance: 3,340; Referee: Rohit Saggi |

| 19 June 2022 10 | Jerv | 1–2 | HamKam | Grimstad |
| 18:00 CEST (UTC+2) | Schröter 83' | Report | Kirkevold 6'; Melgalvis 31' | Stadium: J.J. Ugland Stadion – Levermyr; Attendance: 2,604; Referee: Marius Hansen Grøtta |

| 26 June 2022 11 | HamKam | 3–2 | Sarpsborg 08 | Hamar |
| 18:00 CEST (UTC+2) | Melgalvis 17'; Eriksen 44'; Enkerud 65' | Report | Kuruçay 14' (o.g.); Jonathan Lindseth 42' | Stadium: Briskeby Stadion; Attendance: 3,902; Referee: Espen Eskås |

| 3 July 2022 12 | HamKam | 0–0 | Molde | Hamar |
| 18:00 CEST (UTC+2) | | Report | | Stadium: Briskeby Stadion; Attendance: 5,018; Referee: Sivert Øksnes Amland |

| 10 July 2022 13 | Haugesund | 1–1 | HamKam | Haugesund |
| 20:00 CEST (UTC+2) | Njie 33' | Report | Eriksen 45+3' | Stadium: Haugesund Stadion; Attendance: 3,662; Referee: Tore Hansen |

| 16 July 2022 14 | HamKam | 0–2 | Bodø/Glimt | Hamar |
| 18:00 CEST (UTC+2) | | Report | Pellegrino 77', 82' | Stadium: Briskeby Stadion; Attendance: 5,316; Referee: Daniel Higraff |

| 24 July 2022 15 | Strømsgodset | 1–1 | HamKam | Drammen |
| 20:00 CEST (UTC+2) | Jack 49' | Report | Onsrud 74' | Stadium: Marienlyst Stadion; Attendance: 4,358; Referee: Christian Moen |

| 31 July 2022 16 | HamKam | 0–1 | Kristiansund | Hamar |
| 18:00 CEST (UTC+2) | | Report | Aasbak 44' | Stadium: Briskeby Stadion; Attendance: 3,203; Referee: Svein Tore Sinnes |

| 7 August 2022 17 | Rosenborg | 2–1 | HamKam | Trondheim |
| 18:00 CEST (UTC+2) | Tengstedt 14'; Sæter 71' | Report | Onsrud 32' | Stadium: Lerkendal stadion Attendance: 11,387; Referee: Daniel Higraff |

| 14 August 2022 18 | HamKam | 1–1 | Vålerenga | Hamar |
| 20:00 CEST (UTC+2) | Faraas 90+3' | Report | Udahl 45+3' | Stadium: Briskeby Stadion; Attendance: 5,492; Referee: Tore Hansen |

| 20 August 2022 19 | Bodø/Glimt | 2–2 | HamKam | Bodø |
| 18:00 CEST (UTC+2) | Pellegrino 40', 72' (pen.) | Report | Kuruçay 54'; Kirkevold 86' | Stadium: Aspmyra Stadion; Attendance: 6,303; Referee: Marius Hansen Grøtta |

| 28 August 2022 20 | HamKam | 1–0 | Haugesund | Hamar |
| 18:00 CEST (UTC+2) | Sjølstad 18' | Report | | Stadium: Briskeby Stadion; Attendance: 4,318; Referee: Rohit Saggi |

| 4 September 2022 21 | Sarpsborg 08 | 2–1 | HamKam | Sarpsborg |
| 18:00 CEST (UTC+2) | Skålevik 90+3'; Heintz 90+6' (pen.) | Report | Hernandez-Foster 5' | Stadium: Sarpsborg Stadion; Attendance: 5,238; Referee: Sivert Øksnes Amland |

| 11 September 2022 22 | HamKam | 1–2 | Viking | Hamar |
| 18:00 CEST (UTC+2) | Bjørlo 8' | Report | Løkberg 9'; Svendsen 80' | Stadium: Briskeby Stadion; Attendance: 4,562; Referee: Kai Erik Steen |

| 17 September 2022 23 | Odd | 2–0 | HamKam | Skien |
| 18:00 CEST (UTC+2) | Jevtović 49' (pen.), 89' (pen.) | Report | | Stadium: Skagerak Arena; Attendance: 3,818; Referee: Kristoffer Hagenes |

| 2 October 2022 24 | HamKam | 2–1 | Jerv | Hamar |
| 17:00 CEST (UTC+2) | Melgalvis 28', 49' | Report | Andersen 63' | Stadium: Briskeby Stadion; Attendance: 3,871; Referee: Marius Lien |

| 9 October 2022 25 | Molde | 5–0 | HamKam | Molde |
| 17:00 CEST (UTC+2) | Eikrem 8', 37'; Brynhildsen 13'; Kaasa 26'; Fofana 72' | Report | | Stadium: Aker Stadion; Attendance: 7,092; Referee: Mohammad Usman Aslam |

| 16 October 2022 26 | Aalesund | 0–0 | HamKam | Ålesund |
| 17:00 CEST (UTC+2) | | Report | | Stadium: Color Line Stadion; Attendance: 4,392; Referee: Christian Moen |

| 23 October 2022 27 | HamKam | 1–1 | Strømsgodset | Hamar |
| 17:00 CEST (UTC+2) | Kuruçay 31' | Report | Hove 41' | Stadium: Briskeby Stadion; Attendance: 4,374; Referee: Daniel Higraff |

| 30 October 2022 28 | Sandefjord | 1–2 | HamKam | Sandefjord |
| 17:00 CET (UTC+1) | Rufo 50' | Report | Sjølstad 25'; Kirkevold 60' | Stadium: Release Arena; Attendance: 2,744; Referee: Rohit Saggi |

| 6 November 2022 29 | HamKam | 1–2 | Tromsø | Hamar |
| 17:00 CET (UTC+1) | Nouri 54' | Report | Kitolano 72'; Nordås 80' | Stadium: Briskeby Stadion; Attendance: 3,994; Referee: Tommy Skjerven |

| 13 November 2022 30 | Lillestrøm | 3–1 | HamKam | Lillestrøm |
| 17:00 CET (UTC+1) | Lehne Olsen 22'; Adams 56', 80' | Report | Onsrud 11' | Stadium: Åråsen Stadion; Attendance: 7,073; Referee: Marius Hansen Grøtta |

=== Norwegian Football Cup ===
| 19 May 2022 First round | Furnes | 0–7 | HamKam | Ringsaker |
| 18:00 CEST (UTC+2) | | Report | Enkerud 4', 15'; Faraas 8', 63'; Daškevičs 47'; Nouri 72'; Yakovenko 78' | Stadium: Gaalaasbana; Attendance: 1,307; Referee: Johan William Grundt |

| 22 June 2022 Second round | Elverum | 1–3 | HamKam | Elverum |
| 18:00 CEST (UTC+2) | Lynum 23' | Report | Kongsro 35'; Eriksen 54'; Enkerud 83' | Stadium: Elverum Stadion; Attendance: 1,114; Referee: Tom Harald Hagen |

| 17 August 2022 Third round | HamKam | 0–0 (a.e.t.) (5–6 p) | Tromsø | Hamar |
| 18:00 CEST (UTC+2) | | Report; Penalties | | Stadium: Briskeby Stadion; Attendance: 1,294; Referee: Ola Hobber Nilsen |
| | Penalties |
| | Pedersen (penalty missed); Melgalvis (penalty scored); Faerrón (penalty missed); Kuruçay (penalty scored); Hernandez-Foster (penalty scored); Onsrud (penalty scored); Faraas (penalty scored); Jendal (penalty missed) | | (penalty missed) Tuominen; (penalty scored) Øyvann; (penalty missed) Vesterlund; (penalty scored) Jenssen; (penalty scored) Opsahl; (penalty scored) Aarflot; (penalty scored) Kamanzi; (penalty scored) Hafstad |
