= 2025 Hamarkameratene season =

HamKam
2025 season
- Chairman: Truls Nordby Johansen
- Head coach: Jakob Michelsen (until 20 August); Thomas Myhre (from 20 August)
- Stadium: Briskeby Stadion
- Eliteserien: 11th
- 2025 Norwegian Cup: Fourth round
- 2025–26 Norwegian Cup: Fourth round
Home colours	Away colours

The 2025 season was the 107th season in the history of HamKam and their 4th consecutive season in the top flight of Norwegian football. The club competed in the Eliteserien and the Norwegian Football Cup.

== Transfers ==
=== In ===
Pos.	Player	Transferred from	Fee	Date	Source
MF	(Norway) Markus Johnsgård	(Norway) Tromsø	Undisclosed	14 February 2025	
DF	(Sweden) Gustav Granath	(Sweden) Västerås SK		23 February 2025	
DF	(Norway) Ethan Amundsen-Day	(Norway) Fredrikstad	Undisclosed	1 August 2025	
FW	(Norway) Julian Gonstad	(Norway) Raufoss	Loan return	1 September 2025	
MF	(Norway) William Osnes-Ringen	(Norway) Raufoss	Loan return	1 September 2025	
MF	(Kosovo) Ylldren Ibrahimaj	(Czech Republic) Mladá Boleslav		3 September 2025	

=== Out ===
Pos.	Player	Transferred to	Fee	Date	Source
FW	(Norway) Julian Gonstad	(Norway) Raufoss	Loan	5 August 2025	
MF	(Norway) William Osnes-Ringen	(Norway) Raufoss	Loan	5 August 2025	

== Friendlies ==
=== Pre-season ===
24 January 2025 Friendly	HamKam (Norway)	0–2	(Norway) Strømsgodset	Lillestrøm
				Stadium: LSK-Hallen

30 January 2025 Friendly	Raufoss (Norway)	1–3	(Norway) HamKam	Raufoss
				Stadium: Raufoss Industripark Arena

14 February 2025 Friendly	HamKam (Norway)	2–2	(Norway) Bryne	Lillestrøm
12:25 UTC+1				Stadium: LSK-Hallen

21 February 2025 Friendly	HamKam (Norway)	0–1	(Norway) Fredrikstad	Lillestrøm
		Report	Stian Stray Molde 66'	Stadium: LSK-Hallen

7 March 2025 Friendly	Sarpsborg 08 (Norway)	2–1	(Norway) HamKam
16:30 UTC+1

8 March 2025 Friendly	HamKam (Norway)	1–2	(Iceland) Valur
16:30 UTC+1

13 March 2025 Friendly	Crystal Palace (England)	1–0	(Norway) HamKam	Marbella, Spain
16:00	Matheus França 61'	Report

18 March 2025 Friendly	Kongsvinger (Norway)	1–1	(Norway) HamKam
13:00

22 March 2025 Friendly	Tromsø (Norway)	2–0	(Norway) HamKam
14:00 UTC+1

== Competitions ==
=== Overview ===
Competition	First match	Last match	Starting round	Record							
Competition	First match	Last match	Starting round	Pld	W	D	L	GF	GA	GD	Win %
Eliteserien	30 March 2025	30 November 2025	Matchday 1	6	1	1	4	4	15	−11	16.67
Norwegian Football Cup	12 April 2025		First round	3	3	0	0	5	0	+5	100.00
Total				9	4	1	4	9	15	−6	44.44

Last updated: 11 May 2025
Source: Competitions

=== Eliteserien ===
==== League table ====
Pos	Team	Pld	W	D	L	GF	GA	GD	Pts
9	Sarpsborg 08	30	11	8	11	48	50	−2	41
10	Molde	30	12	3	15	46	42	+4	39
11	HamKam	30	10	7	13	42	47	−5	37
12	KFUM Oslo	30	8	11	11	42	41	+1	35
13	Kristiansund	30	9	7	14	34	59	−25	34

Source: Football Association of Norway (in Norwegian)
Rules for classification: 1) Points; 2) Goal difference; 3) Goals scored; 4) Head-to-head points; 5) Head-to-head goal difference; 6) Head-to-head goals scored.

==== Results summary ====
Overall								Home						Away					
Pld	W	D	L	GF	GA	GD	Pts	W	D	L	GF	GA	GD	W	D	L	GF	GA	GD
6	1	1	4	4	15	−11	4	1	1	1	4	6	−2	0	0	3	0	9	−9

Source: NFF

==== Results by round ====
Round	1	2	3	4	5	6
Ground	H	A	H	A	H	A
Result	W	L	L	L	D	L
Position	5					

Source: NFF
A = Away; H = Home; W = Win; D = Draw; L = Loss

==== Matches ====
The match schedule was announced on 20 December 2024.

30 March 2025 1	HamKam	2–1	Kristiansund	Hamar
17:00 UTC+1	Jónsson 4'; Lien 59'		Tufekčić 2'	Stadium: Briskeby Stadion; Attendance: 3,316; Referee: Kristoffer Hagenes

5 April 2025 2	Bodø/Glimt	3–0	HamKam	Bodø
16:00 UTC+2	Saltnes 5', 59'; Høgh 75'			Stadium: Aspmyra Stadion; Attendance: 6,005; Referee: Espen Eskås

21 April 2025 3	HamKam	2–5	Viking	Hamar
17:00				Stadium: Briskeby Stadion

27 April 2025 4	Sandefjord	2–0	HamKam	Sandefjord
17:00	Smajlović 33'; Sigurðarson 47'			Stadium: Jotun Arena; Attendance: 3,408; Referee: Marius Lien

2 May 2025 5	HamKam	0–0	KFUM	Hamar
19:00				Stadium: Briskeby Stadion; Attendance: 2,828; Referee: Sigurd Smehus Kringstad

11 May 2025 6	Sarpsborg 08	4–0	HamKam	Sarpsborg
17:00				Stadium: Sarpsborg Stadion; Attendance: 4,503; Referee: Christian Moen

5 October 2025 24	Fredrikstad	1–1	HamKam	Fredrikstad

19 October 2025 25	HamKam	2–1	Vålerenga	Hamar

26 October 2025 26	Kristiansund	1–3	HamKam	Kristiansund

2 November 2025 27	HamKam	3–1	Sandefjord	Hamar

8 November 2025 28	Viking	3–0	HamKam	Stavanger

23 November 2025 29	HamKam	5–0	Haugesund	Hamar

30 November 2025 30	Brann	3–1	HamKam	Bergen

=== Norwegian Football Cup ===
13 April 2025 First round	Lillehammer	0–2	HamKam	Lillehammer
15:00			Mawa 54'; Mares 74'	Stadium: Stampesletta; Referee: Haakon Arve Pedersen Bue

24 April 2025 Second round	Lørenskog	0–1	HamKam	Lillestrøm
18:00			Jónsson 25'	Stadium: LSK-hallen; Attendance: 320; Referee: Ajdin Medic

7 May 2025 Third round	Lyn	0–2	HamKam	Oslo
18:00				Stadium: Bislett Stadion; Attendance: 1,100; Referee: Daniel Higraff

20 May 2025 Fourth round	Aalesund	v	HamKam	Ålesund
18:00
