= Pål Alexander Kirkevold =

Norwegian footballer (born 1990)

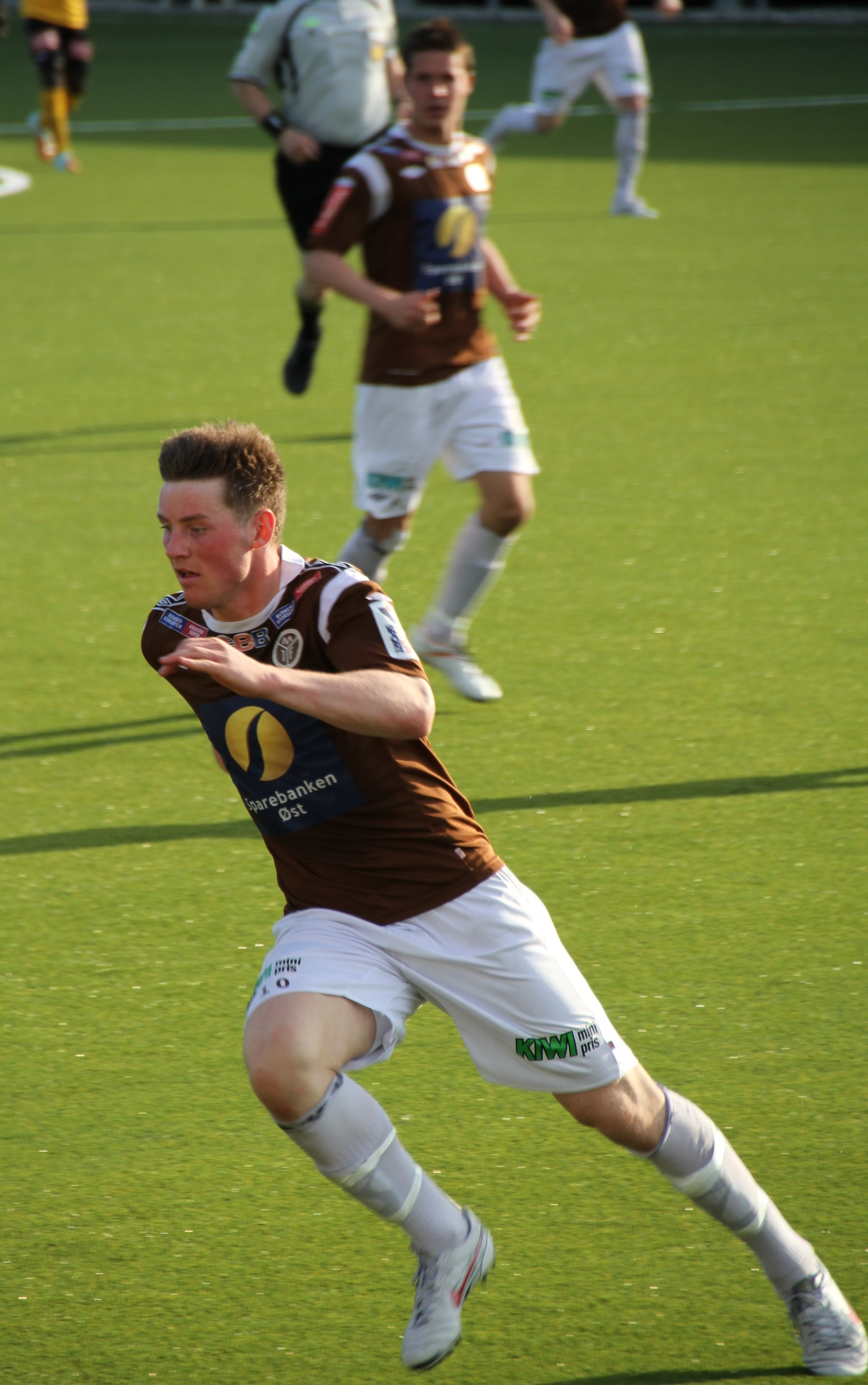
- Kirkevold with Mjøndalen in 2012

Personal information
- Date of birth: 10 November 1990 (age 36)
- Place of birth: Ramnes Municipality, Norway
- Height: 1.89 m (6 ft 2 in)
- Position: Forward

Team information
- Current team: HamKam
- Number: 16

Youth career
- 2002–2005: Ramnes
- 2005–2007: Ivrig
- 2007–2010: Molde

Senior career*
Years	Team	Apps	(Gls)
2010–2011	HamKam	26	(7)
2012–2013	Mjøndalen	54	(23)
2014–2015	Sandefjord	50	(27)
2015–2021	Hobro	122	(46)
2016	→ Sarpsborg 08 (loan)	28	(6)
2021	Stabæk	14	(1)
2022–	HamKam	86	(11)

International career
2017	Norway	1	(0)
- * Club domestic league appearances and goals as of 5 June 2025

Pål Alexander Kirkevold (born 10 November 1990) is a Norwegian professional footballer who plays as a forward for HamKam. He has gained one cap for the Norway national team.

== Club career ==
Hailing from Ramnes Municipality, he started his youth career in Ramnes IF and also played senior football for IL Ivrig at age 15 before joining Molde FK's junior setup.

He came to HamKam from Molde in 2010. He made his debut for the first team in a 4–1 victory against Raufoss in August 2010.

On 2 December 2011, Kirkevold signed a contract with Mjøndalen. Prior to the 2014 season, he returned to his home region of Vestfold to join Sandefjord. Kirkevold was both top goalscorer with 19 goals and named Player of the Year in the 1. divisjon in 2014, beating the club record of Tom Helge Jacobsen, who had 17 goals in 2001.

Kirkevold played 57 matches and scored 31 goals for Sandefjord, before signing a contract with Hobro IK in the Danish Superliga on 2 August 2015. At the end of March 2016, Kirkevold was loaned out from Hobro to Sarpsborg 08 for the 2016 season. After Hobro relegated, he returned to the club halfway through the season, and was part of the team as they won promotion back to the Superliga. Kirkevold scored the decisive goal when Hobro won 1–0 over Vendsyssel FF to secure their return to the highest level.

In the 2017–18 season, Kirkevold set a new record in the Superliga when he scored in 11 successive games. The former record was goals in eight consecutive games, set by Ebbe Sand and Peter Møller. He became the league topscorer that season with 22 goals to his name. During his time in Hobro, Kirkevold was nicknamed Mål-Pål (Goal-Pål) for his remarkable goalscoring abilities.

On 26 July 2021 Hobro confirmed that Kirkevold had returned to Norway and would join an unnamed Norwegian club, rumored to be Stabæk.

== International career ==
On 31 October 2017, Kirkevold gained his first call-up from coach Lars Lagerbäck for Norway for the matches against Macedonia and Slovakia.

On 11 November 2017, he made his international debut for Norway against Macedonia, coming on as a substitute for Alexander Sørloth.

== Career statistics ==
As of match played 16 June 2025

Club statistics
Club	Season	League			National Cup		Other		Total	
Club	Season	Division	Apps	Goals	Apps	Goals	Apps	Goals	Apps	Goals
HamKam	2011	Norwegian First Division	26	7	0	0	—		26	7
Mjøndalen	2012	Norwegian First Division	29	9	4	3	1 (Note: Appearance in the 2012 Norwegian First Division promotion play offs)	0	34	12
Mjøndalen	2023	Norwegian First Division	25	14	3	3	2 (Note: Appearances in the 2013 Norwegian First Division promotion play offs)	0	30	17
Mjøndalen	Total		54	23	7	6	3	0	64	29
Sandefjord	2014	Norwegian First Division	29	19	2	1	—		31	20
Sandefjord	2015	Tippeligaen	21	8	5	3	—		26	11
Sandefjord	Total		50	27	7	4	0	0	57	31
Hobro	2015–16	Danish Superliga	15	2	1	0	—		16	2
Hobro	2016–17	Danish 1st Division	14	9	0	0	—		14	9
Hobro	2017–18	Danish Superliga	31	21	2	0	1 (Note: Appearance in the 2017–18 Danish Superliga European play-offs)	1	34	22
Hobro	2018–19	Danish Superliga	19	7	1	1	4 (Note: Appearances in the 2018–19 Danish Superliga Relegation play-offs)	0	24	8
Hobro	2019–20	Danish Superliga	31	6	1	0	2 (Note: Appearances in the 2019–20 Danish Superliga Relegation play-offs)	0	34	6
Hobro	2020–21	Danish 1st Division	11	1	0	0	—		11	1
Hobro	2021–22	Danish 1st Division	1	0	0	0	—		1	0
Hobro	Total		122	46	5	1	7	1	134	48
Sarpsborg 08 (loan)	2016	Tippeligaen	28	6	5	2	—		33	8
Stabæk	2021	Eliteserien	14	1	2	0	—		16	1
HamKam	2022	Eliteserien	27	4	2	0	—		29	4
HamKam	2023	Eliteserien	28	6	2	1	—		30	7
HamKam	2024	Eliteserien	25	1	2	2	—		27	3
HamKam	2025	Eliteserien	6	0	4	0	—		10	0
HamKam	Total		86	11	10	3	0	0	96	14
Career totals			380	121	36	16	10	1	426	138

== Honours ==
Sandefjord

- Norwegian First Division: 2014

Hobro

- Danish 1st Division: 2016–17

Individual

- Norwegian First Division Top Scorer: 2014
- Norwegian First Division Player of the Year: 2014
- Danish Superliga Top Scorer: 2017–18
