= 2025 Raufoss IL season =

Raufoss
2025 season
- Chairman: Mathias Engebakken
- Head coach: Tom Dent (until 6 October); Jörgen Wålemark (from 7 October)
- Stadium: Nammo Stadion
- 1. divisjon: 13th
- 2025 Norwegian Cup: Second round
- 2025–26 Norwegian Cup: First round
- Top goalscorer: League: James Ampofo; Ryan Nelson (6 each); All: Ryan Nelson (8)
Home colours	Away colours	Third colours

The 2025 season was the 108th in the history of Raufoss IL and their seventh consecutive season in the second tier of Norwegian football. The club competed in the Norwegian First Division and the Norwegian Football Cup.

== Transfers ==
=== In ===
Pos.	Player	Transferred from	Fee	Date	Source
MF	(Norway) Jonas Sørensen Selnæs			4 February 2025	
FW	(Norway) Elias Aarflot	(Norway) Tromsø IL	Loan	24 February 2025	
DF	(Sweden) Rasmus Bonde	(Sweden) AIK	Loan	26 February 2025	
GK	(Norway) Anders Klemensson	(Norway) Kongsvinger		3 March 2025	
FW	(Norway) Markus Aanesland	Unattached		30 March 2025	
FW	(Norway) Julian Gonstad	(Norway) HamKam	Loan	5 August 2025	
MF	(Norway) William Osnes-Ringen	(Norway) HamKam	Loan	5 August 2025	

=== Out ===
Pos.	Player	Transferred to	Fee	Date	Source
DF	(Norway) Jakob Nyland Ørsahl	(Norway) Aalesund		24 June 2025	
FW	(Ghana) James Ampofo	(Norway) Strømsgodset	Undisclosed	10 July 2025	
MF	(Norway) Kodjo Somesi	(Norway) Strømmen		12 August 2025	
FW	(Norway) Elias Aarflot	(Norway) Tromsø IL	Loan return	19 August 2025	
FW	(Norway) Julian Gonstad	(Norway) HamKam	Loan return	1 September 2025	
MF	(Norway) William Osnes-Ringen	(Norway) HamKam	Loan return	1 September 2025	

== Friendlies ==
=== Pre-season ===
25 January 2025 Friendly	Raufoss (Norway)	0–0	(Norway) Strømmen
12:30

30 January 2025 Friendly	Raufoss (Norway)	1–3	(Norway) HamKam

15 February 2025 Friendly	Raufoss (Norway)	1–1	(Norway) Skeid
14:00

19 February 2025 Friendly	Raufoss (Norway)	1–0	(Norway) Ull/Kisa
12:00

1 March 2025 Friendly	Raufoss (Norway)	1–2	(Norway) Grorud
12:00

8 March 2025 Friendly	Raufoss (Norway)	1–0	(Norway) Moss
12:00

18 March 2025 Friendly	Lillestrøm (Norway)	3–1	(Norway) Raufoss
14:00

23 March 2025 Friendly	Raufoss (Norway)	4–0	(Norway) Kjelsås
14:00

== Competitions ==
=== Overview ===
Competition	First match	Last match	Starting round	Final position	Record							
Competition	First match	Last match	Starting round	Final position	Pld	W	D	L	GF	GA	GD	Win %
Norwegian First Division	31 March 2025	8 November 2025	Matchday 1	13th	30	7	9	14	43	56	−13	23.33
2025 Norwegian Football Cup	12 April 2025	24 April 2025	First round	Second round	2	1	0	1	5	3	+2	50.00
2025–26 Norwegian Football Cup	13 August 2025		First round	First round	1	0	0	1	0	3	−3	0.00
Total					33	8	9	16	48	62	−14	24.24

Source: Competitions

=== First Division ===
==== League table ====
Pos	Team	Pld	W	D	L	GF	GA	GD	Pts	Promotion, qualification or relegation
11	Stabæk	30	7	10	13	45	53	−8	31	
12	Åsane	30	7	10	13	38	53	−15	31	
13	Raufoss (Note: Raufoss were deducted 1 point.)	30	7	9	14	43	56	−13	29	
14	Moss (O)	30	7	7	16	41	65	−24	28	Qualification for the relegation play-offs
15	Mjøndalen (R)	30	6	7	17	36	71	−35	25	Relegation to Second Division

Source: OBOS-ligaen (in Norwegian)
Rules for classification: 1) Points; 2) Goal difference; 3) Goals scored; 4) Head-to-head points; 5) Head-to-head goal difference; 6) Head-to-head goals scored.
(O) Play-off winners; (R) Relegated

==== Results summary ====
Overall								Home						Away					
Pld	W	D	L	GF	GA	GD	Pts	W	D	L	GF	GA	GD	W	D	L	GF	GA	GD
30	7	9	14	43	56	−13	30	4	4	7	20	22	−2	3	5	7	23	34	−11

Source: NFF

==== Results by round ====
Round	1	2	3	4
Ground	H	A	H	H
Result	W	D	W	L
Position	2			

Source: NFF
A = Away; H = Home; W = Win; D = Draw; L = Loss

==== Matches ====
1 April 2025 1	Raufoss	3–2	Moss	Raufoss
19:00	Hustad 20' (pen.); Sørensen Selnæs 35'; Nelson (red card) 60'; Somesi 85'		Håpnes 83'; Hay 90+6' (o.g.)	Stadium: Nammo Stadion; Referee: Stian Røvig Sletner

5 April 2025 2	Mjøndalen	1–1	Raufoss	Mjøndalen
16:00 UTC+2				Stadium: Consto Arena

21 April 2025 3	Raufoss	3–2	Åsane	Raufoss
17:00

28 April 2025 4	Raufoss	0–1	Egersund	Raufoss
19:00

3 May 2025 5	Aalesund	3–1	Raufoss	Ålesund
16:00

11 May 2025 6	Raufoss	0–0	IK Start

15 May 2025 7	Ranheim	1–1	Raufoss

24 May 2025 8	Raufoss	1–0	Stabæk

31 May 2025 9	Sogndal	2–2	Raufoss

15 June 2025 10	Raufoss	1–1	Odd

18 June 2025 11	Lyn	3–2	Raufoss

21 June 2025 12	Raufoss	6–1	Hødd

28 June 2025 13	Kongsvinger	2–2	Raufoss

26 July 2025 14	Raufoss	1–1	Skeid

30 July 2025 15	Lillestrøm	2–1	Raufoss

2 August 2025 16	Raufoss	0–3	Lyn

6 August 2025 18	Raufoss	2–2	Kongsvinger

10 August 2025 17	Odd	1–2	Raufoss

18 August 2025 19	Åsane	4–2	Raufoss

23 August 2025 20	Raufoss	1–2	Lillestrøm

30 August 2025 21	Hødd	2–4	Raufoss

13 September 2025 22	Raufoss	0–1	Aalesund

21 September 2025 23	Stabæk	3–0	Raufoss

29 September 2025 24	Raufoss	1–2	Ranheim

4 October 2025 25	IK Start	4–0	Raufoss

18 October 2025 26	Egersund	4–0	Raufoss

22 October 2025 27	Raufoss	1–3	Sogndal

25 October 2025 28	Skeid	1–4	Raufoss

2 November 2025 29	Raufoss	0–1	Mjøndalen

8 November 2025 30	Moss	1–1	Raufoss

=== 2025 Norwegian Football Cup ===
12 April 2025 First round	Brumunddal	1–4	Raufoss	Brumunddal
15:00				Stadium: SH-banen, Kunstgress; Referee: Johan William Grundt

24 April 2025 Second round	Strømmen	2–1	Raufoss
18:00

=== 2025–26 Norwegian Football Cup ===
13 August 2025 Second round	Hønefoss	3–0	Raufoss
18:00
