= Lars Jendal =

Norwegian footballer (born 1999)

Personal information
- Full name: Lars Larsson Jendal
- Date of birth: 24 April 1999 (age 27)
- Height: 1.93 m (6 ft 4 in)
- Position: Goalkeeper

Team information
- Current team: Sogndal
- Number: 1

Youth career
- –2017: HamKam

Senior career*
Years	Team	Apps	(Gls)
2015–2023	HamKam 2	53	(0)
2015–2023	HamKam	40	(0)
2018	→ Nybergsund (loan)	25	(0)
2019	→ Asker (loan)	13	(0)
2021	→ Arendal (loan)	26	(0)
2024–	Sogndal	86	(0)
- * Club domestic league appearances and goals as of 14 November 2026

Lars Larsson Jendal (born 24 April 1999) is a Norwegian football goalkeeper who currently plays for Sogndal.

== Career ==
A youth goalkeeper in Hamkam, he trained with the senior team for the first time in 2015. He made his Hamkam debut in the 2015 2. divisjon against Rødde, and his cup debut in 2017 against Nybergsund, where Hamkam lost via penalty shootout. He was loaned out to Nybergsund in 2018, then Asker in 2019, playing for these clubs in the cup and the 2. divisjon.

Jendal fully committed to football after finishing upper secondary school, and in 2020 he finally became the first-choice goalkeeper of Hamkam. Starting in the fall of 2020, Hamkam prioritized to loan or acquire a series of other goalkeepers, leaving Jendal on the bench again. In the entire 2021 season, Jendal was loaned out to his third Second Division club, this time Arendal. Meanwhile, Hamkam won promotion to the 2022 Eliteserien.

Jendal worked at a steady pace and was allowed to make his Eliteserien debut in October 2022, remaining the first-choice goalkeeper throughout 2022. He managed one clean sheet. That meant he also signed a new contract until the end of 2024, entailing better economic conditions.

In 2023, Hamkam signed yet another goalkeeper Marcus Sandberg, with Jendal making his first appearance that season after Sandberg was sent off. Sandberg returned, but sustained an injury which led Jendal to play most of the games in the summer.

Ahead of the 2024 season he decided to leave Hamkam, and signed for second-tier club Sogndal. According to Sogn Avis, the first half of the 2024 1. divisjon entailed both "high peaks" and "somewhat tougher experiences" for Jendal.

== Career statistics ==
As of 23 September 2025

Appearances and goals by club, season and competition
Club	Season	League			National Cup		Other		Total	
Club	Season	Division	Apps	Goals	Apps	Goals	Apps	Goals	Apps	Goals
HamKam 2	2015	3. divisjon	7	0	—		—		7	0
HamKam 2	2016	3. divisjon	7	0	—		—		7	0
HamKam 2	2017	4. divisjon	9	0	—		—		9	0
HamKam 2	2019	4. divisjon	7	0	—		—		7	0
HamKam 2	2022	4. divisjon	17	0	—		—		17	0
HamKam 2	2023	3. divisjon	6	0	—		—		6	0
HamKam 2	Total		53	0	—		—		53	0
HamKam	2015	2. divisjon	2	0	0	0	—		2	0
HamKam	2016	2. divisjon	5	0	0	0	—		5	0
HamKam	2017	2. divisjon	1	0	1	0	—		2	0
HamKam	2020	1. divisjon	17	0	—		—		17	0
HamKam	2022	Eliteserien	7	0	3	0	—		10	0
HamKam	2023	Eliteserien	8	0	2	0	—		10	0
HamKam	Total		40	0	6	0	—		46	0
Nybergsund (loan)	2018	2. divisjon	25	0	1	0	—		26	0
Asker (loan)	2019	2. divisjon	13	0	2	0	—		15	0
Arendal (loan)	2021	2. divisjon	26	0	3	0	2 (Note: Appearances in 2. divisjon promotional play-offs)	0	31	0
Sogndal	2024	1. divisjon	30	0	2	0	—		32	0
Sogndal	2025	1. divisjon	21	0	3	0	—		24	0
Sogndal	Total		51	0	5	0	—		56	0
Career total			208	0	17	0	2	0	227	0
