= Kristian Eriksen =

Norwegian footballer (born 1995)

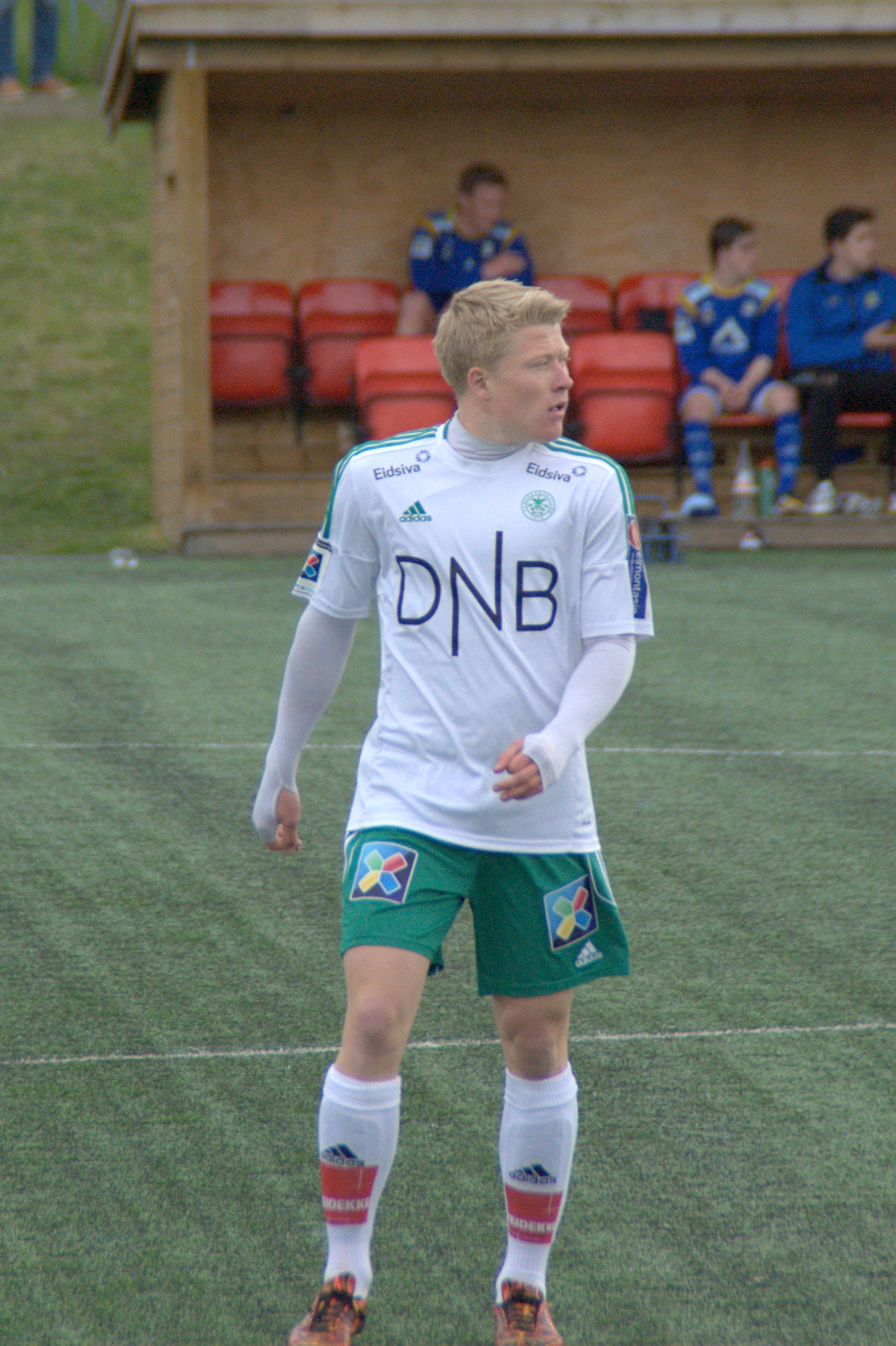
- Eriksen with Hamkam in 2015

Personal information
- Date of birth: 18 July 1995 (age 31)
- Height: 1.77 m (5 ft 10 in)
- Position: Midfielder

Team information
- Current team: Brann
- Number: 16

Youth career
- Vang
- Hamkam

Senior career*
Years	Team	Apps	(Gls)
2014–2015	Hamkam	43	(1)
2016–2017	Brumunddal	41	(8)
2018–2020	Elverum	46	(7)
2020–2022	HamKam	61	(19)
2022–2026	Molde	86	(23)
2026–	Brann	22	(6)
- * Club domestic league appearances and goals as of 25 October 2026

Kristian Eriksen (born 18 July 1995) is a Norwegian professional footballer who plays as a midfielder for Eliteserien club Brann.

== Career ==
He hails from Hamar. Eriksen played youth football for Vang FL before playing for the U17 and U20 teams of Hamkam. He made his senior debut in the 2014 1. divisjon against Nest-Sotra, and played most of the games in 2014, but with fewer games and no league goals in 2015 he was deemed surplus to requirements. In 2016 he moved on to Brumunddal and in 2018 to Elverum.

Elverum's 2020 3. divisjon was postponed and later cancelled because of the COVID-19 pandemic in Norway. Elverum was allowed to train, but without player contact. Eriksen's career having hit a dead end, he sent a text message to Hamkam, asking to train with the 1. divisjon team. "I have always been 100% and am more than willing to bleed for the childhood club", he wrote. The director of sports Espen Olsen received "thousands" of inquiries from players wanting to play on the Norwegian second tier, and left most of them unanswered, but decided to give the chance to this one former Hamkam player. While not impressing from his first training session, Eriksen underwent a rigorous individual training programme. Eriksen was eventually signed in September 2020, his contract only spanning the remainder of 2020. The season being postponed, Eriksen signed in time to play 15 league games.

His contract was renewed for 2021, and in the summer he had become the club's top goalscorer from midfield position, as Hamkam led the table. In October he reached double digits. Hamkam eventually won promotion.

His contract offer in 2021 entailed being fully professional. However, he chose to stay on a part-time basis in his former job as a children- and youth worker in Vestenga kindergarten. Eriksen dedicates goals to his deceased grandmother and father. His father died in a car accident when Kristian Eriksen was 18 years old. His great uncle Knut "Kula" Eriksen played for HamKam from 1958 to 1969, and is the club's all-time top goalscorer.

== Career statistics ==
=== Club ===
As of 25 October 2026

Appearances and goals by club, season and competition
Club	Season	League			National Cup		Europe		Total	
Club	Season	Division	Apps	Goals	Apps	Goals	Apps	Goals	Apps	Goals
HamKam	2014	1. divisjon	26	1	3	0	—		29	1
HamKam	2015	2. divisjon	17	0	2	0	—		19	0
HamKam	Total		43	1	5	0	—		48	1
Brumunddal	2016	2. divisjon	19	5	1	0	—		20	5
Brumunddal	2017	2. divisjon	22	3	2	1	—		24	4
Brumunddal	Total		41	8	3	1	—		44	9
Elverum	2018	2. divisjon	24	2	2	0	—		26	2
Elverum	2019	2. divisjon	22	5	2	0	—		24	5
Elverum	Total		46	7	4	0	—		50	7
HamKam	2020	1. divisjon	15	2	—		—		15	2
HamKam	2021	1. divisjon	30	13	3	0	—		33	13
HamKam	2022	Eliteserien	16	4	2	1	—		18	5
HamKam	Total		61	19	5	1	—		66	20
Molde	2022	Eliteserien	13	2	0	0	10 (Note: Appearances in UEFA Conference League)	1	23	3
Molde	2023	Eliteserien	29	4	9	3	11 (Note: Six appearances and one goal in the UEFA Champions League and five appearances and four goals in the UEFA Europa League)	5	49	12
Molde	2024	Eliteserien	28	14	6	2	15	2	49	18
Molde	2025	Eliteserien	14	3	2	0	4	1	20	4
Molde	2026	Eliteserien	2	0	1	0	—		3	0
Molde	Total		86	23	18	5	40	9	144	38
Brann	2026	Eliteserien	22	6	4	1	7	2	33	9
Career total			299	64	39	8	47	11	385	83

== Honours ==
HamKam

- OBOS-ligaen: 2021

Molde

- Eliteserien: 2022
- Norwegian Cup: 2023

Individual

- Norwegian First Division Player of the Month: August 2021
- Norwegian First Division Player of the Year: 2021
- Eliteserien Top scorer: 2024
