= Vegard Kongsro =

Norwegian footballer (born 1998)

Personal information
- Date of birth: 7 August 1998 (age 28)
- Height: 1.87 m (6 ft 2 in)
- Position: Defender

Team information
- Current team: Yverdon-Sport
- Number: 18

Youth career
- –2012: Herøya
- 2012–2013: Eidanger
- 2014–2016: Odd

Senior career*
Years	Team	Apps	(Gls)
2017–2018	Pors	40	(1)
2019–2020	Ull/Kisa	41	(1)
2021	Bodø/Glimt	2	(0)
2022–2025	HamKam	81	(7)
2025–	Yverdon-Sport	47	(4)

International career^{‡}
2016	Norway U18	2	(0)
- * Club domestic league appearances and goals as of 28 September 2026 ‡ National team caps and goals as of 13 November 2016

Vegard Kongsro (born 7 August 1998) is a Norwegian footballer who plays as a defender for Swiss Super League club Yverdon-Sport.

== Career ==
Kongsro played youth football at Eidanger and Odd, before starting his senior career with Pors in 2017. After two seasons with Pors, he moved to Ull/Kisa in 2019, where he spent another two seasons. In March 2021, he signed a four-year contract with Bodø/Glimt. On 27 June 2021, he made his Eliteserien debut in a 4–1 win against Stabæk. In March 2022, he joined HamKam on a three-year contract.

On 2 January 2025, Kongsro signed with Yverdon-Sport in Switzerland.

== Career statistics ==
As of 2 March 2025

Appearances and goals by club, season and competition
Club	Season	League			National cup		Europe		Total	
Club	Season	Division	Apps	Goals	Apps	Goals	Apps	Goals	Apps	Goals
Pors	2017	3. divisjon	26	0	2	0	—		28	0
Pors	2018	3. divisjon	14	1	1	1	—		15	2
Pors	Total		40	1	3	1	—		43	2
Ull/Kisa	2019	1. divisjon	13	0	3	0	—		16	0
Ull/Kisa	2020	1. divisjon	28	1	—		—		28	1
Ull/Kisa	Total		41	1	3	0	—		44	1
Bodø/Glimt	2021	Eliteserien	2	0	2	0	1 (Note: Appearance in UEFA Conference League)	0	4	0
HamKam	2022	Eliteserien	26	2	2	1	—		28	3
HamKam	2023	Eliteserien	26	2	5	0	—		31	2
HamKam	2024	Eliteserien	29	1	3	0	—		32	1
HamKam	Total		81	5	10	1	—		91	6
Yverdon-Sport	2024–25	Swiss Super League	3	0	0	0	—		3	0
Career total			184	43	13	3	1	0	197	46
