= Julian Gonstad =

Norwegian footballer (born 2002)

Personal information
- Full name: Julian Bakkeli Gonstad
- Date of birth: 29 June 2006 (age 20)
- Height: 1.80 m (5 ft 11 in)
- Position: Striker

Team information
- Current team: KFUM
- Number: 17

Youth career
- –2020: Skreia
- 2021–2023: Hamkam

Senior career*
Years	Team	Apps	(Gls)
2021–2025	HamKam 2	51	(40)
2023–2026	Hamkam	38	(4)
2024	→ Eidsvold Turn (loan)	10	(3)
2024	→ Eidsvold Turn 2 (loan)	1	(2)
2025	→ Raufoss (loan)	5	(5)
2026–	KFUM	5	(1)

International career^{‡}
2021	Norway U15	2	(0)
2022	Norway U16	11	(2)
2023	Norway U17	6	(3)
2024	Norway U18	13	(5)
2024–	Norway U19	9	(0)
- * Club domestic league appearances and goals as of 19 September 2026 ‡ National team caps and goals as of 14 August 2025

Julian Bakkeli Gonstad (born 29 June 2006) is a Norwegian footballer who plays as a striker for KFUM.

== Career ==
He hails from Skreia. He played youth football for Skreia IL, partially on a cooperative team with Kolbu/KK. After the 2020 season he joined the academy of Hamkam in 2021, and also made his debut as a Norway youth international that year.

Gonstad had a successful year for youth and B teams in 2023, ending the season with a hat-trick for Hamkam 2 against Raufoss 2. Despite also making his Eliteserien debut in 2023, he did not break through in Hamkam's first team. In August 2024 he was therefore loaned out to third-tier club Eidsvold Turn. He returned in late October 2024.

Gonstad's first Eliteserien goal, a penalty against Viking in April 2025, was overshadowed by Hamkam losing the game 2–5. Amid rumours of interest shown by larger clubs, Gonstad penned a long-term contract with Hamkam in May 2025. Nonetheless, he was still not a regular starter and was loaned out to Raufoss IL in August. He immediately scored, followed by a decisive goal in an away victory over Odd.

== International career ==
He was a squad member for both the 2024 and 2025 UEFA European Under-19 Championship.

== Career statistics ==
As of 19 September 2026

Appearances and goals by club, season and competition
Club	Season	League			National Cup		Total	
Club	Season	Division	Apps	Goals	Apps	Goals	Apps	Goals
HamKam 2	2021	4. divisjon	6	2	—		6	2
HamKam 2	2022	4. divisjon	15	15	—		15	15
HamKam 2	2023	3. divisjon	18	17	—		18	17
HamKam 2	2024	3. divisjon	6	3	—		6	3
HamKam 2	2025	3. divisjon	6	3	—		6	3
HamKam 2	Total		51	40	—		51	40
HamKam	2023	Eliteserien	2	0	0	0	2	0
HamKam	2024	Eliteserien	4	0	4	0	8	0
HamKam	2025	Eliteserien	21	4	5	0	26	4
HamKam	2026	Eliteserien	7	0	1	0	8	0
HamKam	Total		38	4	10	0	48	4
Eidsvold Turn (loan)	2024	2. divisjon	10	3	0	0	10	3
Eidsvold Turn 2 (loan)	2024	4. divisjon	1	2	—		1	2
Raufoss (loan)	2025	1. divisjon	5	5	0	0	5	5
KFUM	2026	Eliteserien	5	1	1	0	6	1
Career total			110	55	11	0	121	55
