= Morten Bjørlo =

Norwegian footballer (born 1995)

Personal information
- Date of birth: 4 October 1995 (age 31)
- Place of birth: Jørpeland, Norway
- Height: 1.83 m (6 ft 0 in)
- Position: Midfielder

Team information
- Current team: Tromsø
- Number: 70

Youth career
- –2014: Staal Jørpeland

Senior career*
Years	Team	Apps	(Gls)
2012–2014	Staal Jørpeland	65	(5)
2015	Sola	15	(2)
2016–2017	Egersund	34	(6)
2018	Nest-Sotra	23	(0)
2019	Egersund	24	(2)
2020	Strømmen	30	(4)
2021–2022	HamKam	44	(5)
2023–2024	Rosenborg	15	(2)
2023	→ HamKam (loan)	11	(1)
2024–2025	Fredrikstad	28	(10)
2025–2026	Konyaspor	37	(0)
2026–	Tromsø	8	(1)
- * Club domestic league appearances and goals as of 21 November 2026

Morten Bjørlo (born 4 October 1995) is a Norwegian footballer who plays as a midfielder for Tromsø.

== Career ==
=== HamKam ===
In January 2021, he joined HamKam on a two-year contract. On 2 April 2022, he made his Eliteserien debut in a 2–2 draw against Lillestrøm.

=== Rosenborg ===
In December 2022, he signed for Rosenborg on a free transfer starting from January 2023.

On 15 August 2023, he was loaned back to HamKam for the rest of the 2023-season.

=== Fredrikstad ===
After the loan at HamKam expired, it was announced that Bjørlo had signed with newly promoted Eliteserien side Fredrikstad on a two-year contract. At Fredrikstad, Bjørlo won the Norwegian Cup at the end of the 2024 season after scoring in the penalty shoot-out against Molde.

=== Konyaspor ===
In February 2025, Bjørlo signed a 2.5-year contract with Turkish side Konyaspor. After one-and-a-half year at the club, Bjørlo terminated his contract in July 2026.

=== Tromsø ===
On 1 September 2026, after Bjørlo terminated the contract with Konyaspor, he returned to Norway, this time signing a three-year contract with Tromsø.

== Career statistics ==
As of 21 November 2026

Appearances and goals by club, season and competition
Club	Season	League			National Cup (Note: Includes Norwegian Cup, Turkish Cup)		Europe		Other		Total	
Club	Season	Division	Apps	Goals	Apps	Goals	Apps	Goals	Apps	Goals	Apps	Goals
Staal Jørpeland	2012	Norwegian Third Division	20	2	3	1	—		—		23	3
Staal Jørpeland	2013	Norwegian Third Division	22	0	0	0	—		—		22	0
Staal Jørpeland	2014	Norwegian Third Division	23	3	1	0	—		—		24	3
Staal Jørpeland	Total		65	5	4	1	—		—		69	6
Sola	2015	Norwegian Second Division	15	2	2	0	—		—		17	2
Egersund	2016	Norwegian Second Division	24	4	2	0	—		—		26	4
Egersund	2017	Norwegian Second Division	10	2	0	0	—		—		10	2
Egersund	Total		34	6	2	0	—		—		36	6
Nest-Sotra	2018	Norwegian First Division	23	0	3	0	—		1 (Note: Appearance in Norwegian First Division promotion play-offs)	0	27	0
Egersund	2019	Norwegian Second Division	24	2	2	1	—		—		26	3
Strømmen	2020	Norwegian First Division	30	4	—		—		—		30	4
HamKam	2021	Norwegian First Division	28	4	3	0	—		—		31	4
HamKam	2022	Eliteserien	16	1	1	0	—		—		17	1
HamKam	Total		44	5	4	0	—		—		48	5
Rosenborg	2023	Eliteserien	15	2	3	0	1 (Note: Appearance in UEFA Europa Conference League)	0	—		19	2
HamKam (loan)	2023	Eliteserien	11	1	0	0	—		—		11	1
Fredrikstad	2024	Eliteserien	28	10	7	4	—		—		35	14
Konyaspor	2024–25	Süper Lig	9	0	3	1	—		—		12	1
Konyaspor	2025–26	Süper Lig	28	0	6	2	—		—		34	2
Konyaspor	Total		37	0	9	3	—		—		46	3
Tromsø	2026	Eliteserien	8	1	2	0	0	0	—		10	1
Career total			334	38	38	9	1	0	1	0	374	47

== Honours ==
HamKam

- Norwegian First Division: 2021

Fredrikstad

- Norwegian Cup: 2024
