= Henrik Udahl =

Norwegian footballer (born 1997)

Personal information
- Date of birth: 12 January 1997 (age 29)
- Place of birth: Askim, Norway
- Height: 1.86 m (6 ft 1 in)
- Position: Striker

Team information
- Current team: HamKam
- Number: 19

Youth career
- –2012: Askim
- 2013–2016: Vålerenga
- 2016–2017: Cincinnati Bearcats

Senior career*
Years	Team	Apps	(Gls)
2015–2016	Vålerenga 2	35	(10)
2016	Vålerenga	0	(0)
2017	Follo	12	(3)
2017	Follo 2	1	(0)
2017–2018	Fana	34	(27)
2019–2020	Åsane	45	(24)
2019	Åsane 2	11	(15)
2021–2022	Vålerenga	48	(10)
2021–2022	Vålerenga 2	17	(12)
2023–	HamKam	84	(17)
2025	HamKam 2	3	(10)
2025	→ Śląsk Wrocław (loan)	10	(0)
2025	→ KFUM (loan)	9	(0)
- * Club domestic league appearances and goals as of 8 Novembet 2026

Henrik Udahl (born 12 January 1997) is a Norwegian professional footballer who plays as a striker for Eliteserien club HamKam.

== Career ==
Hailing from Askim, he tried his luck at junior football in Vålerenga. Not offered a senior contract, he moved to the United States to play for Cincinnati Bearcats, before starting his senior career with Follo in 2017 and later moving to Bergen to study. Here, he became a prolific goalscorer on third and fourth tier with Fana, then third and second tier with Åsane. After becoming top goalscorer of the 2020 1. divisjon, he earned a transfer back to Vålerenga.

== Career statistics ==
As of 8 Novembet 2026

Appearances and goals by club, season and competition
Club	Season	League			National cup (Note: Includes Norwegian Cup)		Europe		Other		Total	
Club	Season	Division	Apps	Goals	Apps	Goals	Apps	Goals	Apps	Goals	Apps	Goals
Vålerenga 2	2015	2. divisjon	15	4	—		—		—		15	4
Vålerenga 2	2016	2. divisjon	20	6	—		—		—		20	6
Vålerenga 2	Total		35	10	—		—		—		35	10
Vålerenga	2016	Eliteserien	0	0	1	1	—		—		1	1
Follo	2017	2. divisjon	12	3	1	0	—		—		13	3
Follo 2	2017	4. divisjon	1	0	—		—		—		1	0
Fana	2017	2. divisjon	11	1	0	0	—		—		11	1
Fana	2018	3. divisjon	23	26	0	0	—		—		23	26
Fana	Total		34	27	0	0	—		—		34	27
Åsane	2019	2. divisjon	16	5	2	2	—		4 (Note: Appearances in 2. divisjon promotional play-offs)	0	22	7
Åsane	2020	1. divisjon	29	19	—		—		2 (Note: Appearances in 1. divisjon promotional play-offs)	0	31	19
Åsane	Total		45	24	2	2	—		6	0	53	26
Åsane 2	2019	4. divisjon	11	15	—		—		—		11	15
Vålerenga	2021	Eliteserien	25	6	3	1	2 (Note: Appearances in UEFA Conference League)	0	—		30	7
Vålerenga	2022	Eliteserien	23	4	2	2	—		—		25	6
Vålerenga	Total		48	10	5	3	2	0	—		55	13
Vålerenga 2	2021	2. divisjon	7	5	—		—		—		7	5
Vålerenga 2	2022	2. divisjon	10	7	—		—		—		10	7
Vålerenga 2	Total		17	12	—		—		—		17	12
HamKam	2023	Eliteserien	27	7	5	3	—		—		32	10
HamKam	2024	Eliteserien	29	3	4	2	—		—		33	5
HamKam	2025	Eliteserien	6	0	0	0	—		—		6	0
HamKam	2026	Eliteserien	22	7	4	0	—		—		26	7
HamKam	Total		84	17	13	5	—		—		97	22
HamKam 2	2025	3. divisjon	3	10	—		—		—		3	10
Śląsk Wrocław (loan)	2024–25	Ekstraklasa	10	0	—		—		—		10	0
KFUM (loan)	2025	Eliteserien	9	0	1	0	—		—		10	0
Career total			309	128	23	11	2	0	6	0	340	139

== Honours ==
Individual

- Norwegian First Division top scorer: 2020
- Norwegian First Division Breakthrough of the Year: 2020
