= Gard Simenstad =

Norwegian footballer (born 1999)

Personal information
- Date of birth: 12 April 1999 (age 27)
- Position: Midfielder

Team information
- Current team: Odd
- Number: 20

Youth career
- –2014: Vind
- 2015–2016: Gjøvik-Lyn

Senior career*
Years	Team	Apps	(Gls)
2016–2018	Gjøvik-Lyn	64	(14)
2019–2023	Raufoss	86	(9)
2024–2026	Hamkam	58	(6)
2026–	Odd	11	(0)
- * Club domestic league appearances and goals as of 14 November 2026

Gard Simenstad (born 12 April 1999) is a Norwegian footballer who plays as a wing back or midfielder for Odd.

== Career ==
He started his youth career in Vind IL and then SK Gjøvik-Lyn. For the latter team he started his senior career, but experienced relegation from the 2016 2. divisjon. In the summer of 2017, during a russ trip to Kos, he experienced the 2017 Aegean Sea earthquake. After the 2018 season he started training with First Division club Raufoss IL. His older brother Stian already played for that team.

Simenstad progressed from played a third of Raufoss' league games in 2019, to half of their league games in 2020. He then lost the entire 2021 season due to long-term injury. He made a comeback in March 2022, in the cup game against Strømsgodset, where he also scored.

With Simenstad being a mainstay in the Raufoss team in 2022 and 2023, his contract was due to expire and he was followed by a number of teams, choosing to sign for Eliteserien club Hamkam. At Hamkam, Simenstad made a breakthrough and especially became known as one of Eliteserien's most proficient free kick takers. On 8 May he scored from about 25 metres against Vålerenga in the cup. The NRK commentators Tete Lidbom and Carl-Erik Torp said, respectively: "It's David Beckham against Greece for England!" and "Give the man his own documentary film!". On 20 May he scored the winning goal against reigning champions Bodø/Glimt, and on 1 June he scored against Brann. Comparisons to Trent Alexander-Arnold and James Ward Prowse were drawn as well.
