= Leon Hien =

Swedish footballer (born 2001)

Personal information
- Full name: Leon Sansah Dechor Hien
- Date of birth: 31 July 2001 (age 25)
- Place of birth: Stockholm, Sweden
- Height: 1.88 m (6 ft 2 in)
- Position: Centre-back

Team information
- Current team: Tromsø (on loan from Djurgårdens IF)
- Number: 21

Youth career
- –2018: Djursholm
- 2019: Hammarby IF

Senior career*
Years	Team	Apps	(Gls)
2020–2022	Hammarby IF	0	(0)
2020	→ IK Frej (loan)	11	(2)
2021–2022	Hammarby TFF	12	(1)
2023	Odd 2	8	(1)
2023–2024	Odd	22	(1)
2025	Degerfors IF	26	(2)
2026–	Djurgårdens IF	5	(0)
2026	→ Tromsø 2 (loan)	1	(0)
2026–	→ Tromsø (loan)	8	(0)
- * Club domestic league appearances and goals as of 21 November 2026

Leon Sansah Dechor Hien (born 31 July 2001) is a Swedish professional footballer who plays as a centre-back for Tromsø, on loan from Djurgårdens IF.

== Career ==
He has previously represented Odd. He originally played as a forward.

On 5 August 2026, Hien was loaned out to Norwegian side Tromsø on a short term loan until the end of the year, with an option to buy.

== Personal life ==
His brother Isak Hien is also a professional footballer, who plays for Italian side Atalanta and the Swedish national team.

== Career statistics ==
As of 21 November 2026

Appearances and goals by club, season and competition
Club	Season	League			National Cup (Note: Includes Svenska Cupen, Norwegian Cup)		Europe		Total	
Club	Season	Division	Apps	Goals	Apps	Goals	Apps	Goals	Apps	Goals
IK Frej (loan)	2020	Ettan	11	2	0	0	—		11	2
Hammarby TFF	2021	Ettan	3	0	—		—		3	0
Hammarby TFF	2022	Ettan	9	1	—		—		9	1
Hammarby TFF	Total		12	1	—		—		12	1
Odd 2	2023	Norwegian Third Division	8	1	—		—		8	1
Odd	2023	Eliteserien	15	1	0	0	—		15	1
Odd	2024	Eliteserien	7	0	0	0	—		7	0
Odd	Total		22	1	0	0	—		22	1
Degerfors IF	2025	Allsvenskan	26	2	3	0	—		29	2
Djurgårdens IF	2026	Allsvenskan	5	0	1	0	—		6	0
Tromsø 2 (loan)	2026	Norwegian Third Division	1	0	—		—		1	0
Tromsø (loan)	2026	Eliteserien	8	0	3	3	2 (Note: Appearances in UEFA Conference League)	1	13	4
Career total			93	7	7	3	2	1	102	11
