= Elverum Stadion =

Football stadium in Elverum, Norway

- Sentralidrettsplassen
- Interactive map of Elverum Stadion
- Former names: Sentralidrettsplassen
- Location: Elverum, Innlandet, Norway
- Coordinates: 60.8879791°N 11.5547995°E
- Capacity: 1,400
- Surface: Artificial turf
- Record attendance: 4,633
- Field size: 110 m x 67 m

Construction
- Built: 1950
- Renovated: 2006 (Artificial Turf); 2013 (Renovated)

Tenant
- Elverum Fotball (football)

Elverum Stadion, also known as Sentralidrettsplassen, is a football stadium located in the town of Elverum which is located in Elverum Municipality in Innlandet county, Norway. It is the home ground of Elverum Fotball in the 2. divisjon. Elverum Stadion acquired artificial turf in 2006. They had new artificial turf put in and further renovated the stadium in 2013 ahead of the 2013 season where Elverum made their comeback at the second tier of Norwegian football after a 17-year absence. After the renovation the capacity of Elverum Stadion is 1,400.

The record attendance at Elverum Stadion is 4,633. The record was set when Elverum played rivals Ham-Kam 1 September 1991. Ham-Kam won the game 3–0.
