= Jonas Enkerud =

Norwegian footballer (born 1990)

Personal information
- Date of birth: 25 April 1990 (age 36)
- Place of birth: Åsnes Municipality, Norway
- Height: 1.90 m (6 ft 3 in)
- Position: Forward

Team information
- Current team: HB Tórshavn
- Number: 28

Senior career*
Years	Team	Apps	(Gls)
–2010	Flisa		
2010–2013	Nybergsund	75	(25)
2014	Eidsvold Turn	20	(11)
2015–2018	Elverum	87	(37)
2019–2023	HamKam	128	(30)
2024	Gnistan	23	(5)
2025–	HB Tórshavn	12	(2)
- * Club domestic league appearances and goals as of 5 June 2025

Jonas Enkerud (born 25 April 1990) is a Norwegian footballer who plays as a forward for HB Tórshavn in Faroe Islands Premier League.

== Club career ==
He signed a contract with HamKam in December 2018. He took part in the club's promotion from the 2021 First Division, scoring 13 goals. On 2 April 2022, he made his Eliteserien debut against Lillestrøm, scoring one of the goals in a 2–2 draw.

On 31 January 2024, Enkerud moved to Finland and signed with newly promoted Veikkausliiga club Gnistan for the 2024 season. He scored his first goal for his new club on 24 February 2024, in a 5–2 Finnish League Cup win over Ekenäs IF.

In March 2025, he signed with HB Tórshavn in Faroe Islands.

== Career statistics ==
As of 10 March 2025

Appearances and goals by club, season and competition
Club	Season	League			National cup (Note: Includes Norwegian Cup and Suomen Cup)		Other		Total	
Club	Season	Division	Apps	Goals	Apps	Goals	Apps	Goals	Apps	Goals
Nybergsund	2010	1. divisjon	12	0	0	0	–		12	0
Nybergsund	2011	1. divisjon	30	8	0	0	–		30	8
Nybergsund	2012	2. divisjon	25	13	2	2	–		27	15
Nybergsund	2013	2. divisjon	8	4	2	0	–		10	4
Nybergsund	Total		75	25	4	2	0	0	79	27
Eidsvold Turn	2014	2. divisjon	20	11	0	0	–		20	11
Elverum	2015	2. divisjon	12	2	2	2	–		14	4
Elverum	2016	2. divisjon	18	7	2	0	–		20	7
Elverum	2017	1. divisjon	30	7	3	0	–		33	7
Elverum	2018	2. divisjon	26	21	2	0	–		28	21
Elverum	Total		86	37	9	2	0	0	95	39
HamKam	2019	1. divisjon	27	4	2	1	–		29	5
HamKam	2020	1. divisjon	23	7	0	0	–		23	7
HamKam	2021	1. divisjon	30	14	3	3	–		33	17
HamKam	2022	Eliteserien	29	4	3	3	–		32	7
HamKam	2023	Eliteserien	19	1	5	4	–		24	5
HamKam	Total		128	30	13	11	0	0	141	41
HamKam 2	2023	3. divisjon	5	6	–		–		5	6
Gnistan	2024	Veikkausliiga	23	5	1	0	3 (Note: Includes Finnish League Cup)	1	27	6
HB Tórshavn	2025	Faroe Islands Premier League	1	0	0	0	0	0	1	0
Career total			338	114	27	15	3	1	368	130
