= 2018 Norwegian Second Division =

2. divisjon
- Season: 2018
- Champions: Raufoss (Group 1); Skeid (Group 2)
- Promoted: Raufoss; Skeid; KFUM Oslo
- Relegated: Nybergsund; Hønefoss; Stabæk 2 Fløy; Vålerenga 2 Vard Haugesund
- Matches played: 364
- Goals scored: 1,195 (3.28 per match)
- Top goalscorer: Jonas Enkerud (21 goals)

The 2018 2. divisjon (referred to as PostNord-ligaen for sponsorship reasons) was a Norwegian football third-tier league season. The league consisted of 28 teams divided into 2 groups of 14 teams.

The league was played as a double round-robin tournament, where all teams played 26 matches.

== Team changes ==
The following teams changed division since the 2017 season.

Locations of the 2018 2. divisjon teams.
Green: Group 1; Red: Group 2.

=== To 2. divisjon ===
Promoted from 3. divisjon

- Moss
- Stabæk 2
- Fløy
- Brattvåg
- Stjørdals-Blink
- Mjølner

Relegated from 1. divisjon

- Fredrikstad
- Elverum
- Arendal

=== From 2. divisjon ===
Promoted to 1. divisjon

- HamKam
- Nest-Sotra
- Notodden

Relegated to 3. divisjon

- Finnsnes
- Brumunddal
- Follo
- Vindbjart
- Fana
- Byåsen

== League tables ==
=== Group 1 ===
Pos	Team	Pld	W	D	L	GF	GA	GD	Pts	Promotion, qualification or relegation
1	Raufoss (C, P)	26	16	5	5	64	30	+34	53	Promotion to First Division
2	Fredrikstad	26	15	7	4	53	25	+28	52	Qualification for the promotion play-offs
3	Grorud	26	14	6	6	46	31	+15	48	
4	Asker	26	14	3	9	53	31	+22	45	
5	Alta	26	14	3	9	39	28	+11	45	
6	Elverum	26	12	8	6	53	39	+14	44	
7	Mjølner	26	13	5	8	41	41	0	44	
8	Bærum	26	12	4	10	44	33	+11	40	
9	Moss	26	7	9	10	37	42	−5	30	
10	Fram Larvik	26	9	2	15	40	57	−17	29	
11	Odd 2	26	6	4	16	35	52	−17	22	
12	Nybergsund (R)	26	5	6	15	26	58	−32	21	Relegation to Third Division
13	Hønefoss (R)	26	5	5	16	38	67	−29	20	Relegation to Third Division
14	Stabæk 2 (R)	26	3	7	16	34	69	−35	16	Relegation to Third Division

Source: nifs.no (in Norwegian)
Rules for classification: 1) Points; 2) Goal difference; 3) Goals scored; 4) Head-to-head points; 5) Head-to-head goal difference; 6) Head-to-head away goals scored (only if between two teams); 7) Head-to-head goals scored; 8) Play-off (only used to decide champions or relegation).
(C) Champions; (P) Promoted; (R) Relegated

=== Group 2 ===
Pos	Team	Pld	W	D	L	GF	GA	GD	Pts	Promotion, qualification or relegation
1	Skeid (C, P)	26	17	5	4	59	25	+34	56	Promotion to First Division
2	KFUM Oslo (O, P)	26	13	8	5	47	32	+15	47	Qualification for the promotion play-offs
3	Hødd	26	13	8	5	43	30	+13	47	
4	Egersund	26	12	8	6	47	28	+19	44	
5	Bryne	26	11	8	7	45	38	+7	41	
6	Arendal	26	10	6	10	37	34	+3	36	
7	Kjelsås	26	9	8	9	38	36	+2	35	
8	Brattvåg	26	11	2	13	37	51	−14	35	
9	Vidar	26	10	3	13	41	51	−10	33	
10	Nardo	26	8	7	11	33	44	−11	31	
11	Stjørdals-Blink	26	7	7	12	39	48	−9	28	
12	Fløy (R)	26	7	7	12	39	55	−16	28	Relegation to Third Division
13	Vålerenga 2 (R)	26	6	8	12	54	62	−8	26	Relegation to Third Division
14	Vard Haugesund (R)	26	3	5	18	31	56	−25	14	Relegation to Third Division

Source: nifs.no (in Norwegian)
Rules for classification: 1) Points; 2) Goal difference; 3) Goals scored; 4) Head-to-head points; 5) Head-to-head goal difference; 6) Head-to-head away goals scored (only if between two teams); 7) Head-to-head goals scored; 8) Play-off (only used to decide champions or relegation).
(C) Champions; (O) Play-off winners; (P) Promoted; (R) Relegated

== Promotion play-offs ==
The teams who finished in second place in their respective group qualified for the promotion play-offs, where they faced each other over two legs. The winner, KFUM Oslo, then played against the 14th placed team in 1. divisjon for a place in the 2019 1. divisjon.

3 November 2018
14:00 CET

KFUM Oslo	3–0	Fredrikstad
Mawa 39'; Sørås 49'; Gueye 88'	Summary

KFUM Arena, Oslo
Attendance: 1,436
Referee: Christian Moen
10 November 2018
17:00 CET

Fredrikstad	1–1	KFUM Oslo
Aalbu 80'	Summary	Stavrum 88'

Fredrikstad Stadion, Fredrikstad
Attendance: 2,116
Referee: Sivert Øksnes Amland

KFUM Oslo won 4–1 on aggregate.

== Top scorers ==
=== Group 1 ===
Rank	Player	Club	Goals
1	(Norway) Jonas Enkerud	Elverum	21
2	(Norway) Kristoffer Hoven	Hønefoss	19
2	(Sweden) Anton Henningsson	Raufoss	19
4	(Norway) Marcus Mehnert	Asker	15
5	(Norway) Oscar Aga	Stabæk 2	14
5	(Norway) Tobias Lauritsen	Odd 2	14
7	(Norway) Tim Nilsen	Fredrikstad	13
8	(Norway) Mahmoud Sami Laham	Fram Larvik	12
9	(Norway) Vegard Braaten	Alta	11
9	(Norway) Georg Flatgård	Elverum	11
9	(Norway) Oskar Johannes Løken	Raufoss	11

=== Group 2 ===
Rank	Player	Club	Goals
1	(Norway) David Tavakoli	Skeid	17
2	(Norway) Mesut Can	Skeid	16
2	(Norway) Omar Fonstad el Ghaouti	Bryne	16
4	(Norway) Walid Idrissi	Kjelsås	15
5	(The Gambia) Bubacarr Sumareh	Egersund	14
6	(Norway) Markus Naglestad	Hødd	13
6	(Norway) Moses Mawa	KFUM Oslo	13
6	(Norway) Sander Werni	Vålerenga 2	13
9	(Norway) Håkon Leine	Brattvåg	10
9	(Norway) Sondre Hopmark Stokke	Stjørdals-Blink	10
