= John Olav Norheim =

Norwegian footballer (born 1995)

Personal information
- Date of birth: 5 April 1995 (age 31)
- Place of birth: Kristiansand, Norway
- Height: 1.86 m (6 ft 1 in)
- Position: Defender

Team information
- Current team: Start
- Number: 6

Youth career
- Fløy

Senior career*
| Years | Team | Apps | (Gls) |
| 2012–2013 | Fløy | 34 | (5) |
| 2014–2016 | Start | 4 | (0) |
| 2014 | → Fløy (loan) | 11 | (2) |
| 2015 | → Nest-Sotra (loan) | 14 | (5) |
| 2016 | → KFUM Oslo (loan) | 27 | (1) |
| 2017–2018 | Fløy | 46 | (11) |
| 2019 | Strømmen | 26 | (1) |
| 2020–2022 | Jerv | 61 | (7) |
| 2023–2025 | HamKam | 57 | (7) |
| 2025– | Start | 35 | (2) |
- * Club domestic league appearances and goals as of 22 August 2026

John Olav Norheim (born 5 April 1995) is a Norwegian professional footballer who plays as a defender for Norwegian First Division side Start.

== Career ==
Norheim started his career in Fløy, and made his senior debut in 2012. In 2014, he joined IK Start as a youth prospect. He then made his Tippeligaen debut in May 2015 against Molde.

In 2015, he was loaned out to Nest-Sotra Fotball. On 7 January 2016 he was loaned to KFUM Oslo. Ahead of the 2017 season he returned to Fløy.

Norheim signed with Strømmen IF for one year on 27 December 2018.
