= Brynjar Ingi Bjarnason =

Icelandic footballer

Personal information
- Date of birth: 6 December 1999 (age 26)
- Place of birth: Akureyri, Iceland
- Height: 1.94 m (6 ft 4 in)
- Position: Centre-back

Team information
- Current team: Sønderjyske
- Number: 25

Youth career
- –2017: KA

Senior career*
Years	Team	Apps	(Gls)
2017–2021	KA	36	(3)
2017	→ Einherji (loan)	0	(0)
2017	→ Magni (loan)	1	(0)
2018	→ Magni (loan)	15	(0)
2021	Lecce	1	(0)
2021–2023	Vålerenga	10	(0)
2023–2025	HamKam	61	(3)
2025–2026	Greuther Fürth	16	(1)
2026–	Sønderjyske	0	(0)

International career^{‡}
2021–	Iceland	17	(2)
- * Club domestic league appearances and goals as of 18 May 2026 ‡ National team caps and goals as of 10 June 2024

Brynjar Ingi Bjarnason (born 6 December 1999) is an Icelandic footballer who plays as a centre-back for Danish Superliga club Sønderjyske and the Iceland national team.

== Club career ==
On 30 June 2021, he signed a three-year contract with an option for fourth year with Italian club Lecce.

On 23 July 2025, Brynjar Ingi signed a two-season contract with Greuther Fürth in German 2. Bundesliga.

On 8 August 2026, Brynjar Ingi moved to Sønderjyske in Denmark with a three-year deal.

== International career ==
Brynjar Ingi Bjarnason made his international debut for Iceland on 29 May 2021 in a friendly match against Mexico in Arlington, Texas. He scored his first international goal against Poland in Poznań on 8 June 2021.

== Career statistics ==
=== International ===
As of 10 June 2024

Iceland
Year	Apps	Goals
2021	10	2
2022	4	0
2023	0	0
2024	3	0
Total	17	2

==== International goals ====
Scores and results list Iceland's goal tally first.

No.	Date	Venue	Opponent	Score	Result	Competition
1.	8 June 2021	Stadion Miejski, Poznań, Poland	Poland	2–1	2–2	Friendly
2.	5 September 2021	Laugardalsvöllur, Reykjavík, Iceland	North Macedonia	1–2	2–2	2022 FIFA World Cup qualification
