= Fernán Faerrón =

Costa Rican footballer (born 2000)

Personal information
- Full name: Fernán José Faerrón Tristán
- Date of birth: 22 August 2000 (age 26)
- Place of birth: Cartago, Costa Rica
- Height: 1.88 m (6 ft 2 in)
- Position: Centre-back

Youth career
- Cartago
- Deportivo Saprissa
- Desamparados
- 2018: LASK Linz

Senior career*
Years	Team	Apps	(Gls)
2017	Belén	0	(0)
2017–2023	Desamparados		
2019	→ Santos Guápiles (loan)	25	(5)
2020–2022	→ Alajuelense (loan)	58	(4)
2022	→ HamKam (loan)	11	(0)
2023–2025	Herediano	71	(1)
2025	→ Vorskla Poltava (loan)	2	(0)
2026	Cartaginés	14	(2)

International career^{‡}
2015	Costa Rica U-15	2	(0)
2017	Costa Rica U-17	3	(0)
2018	Costa Rica U-20	1	(0)
2021	Costa Rica U-23	2	(0)
2024–	Costa Rica	11	(0)
- * Club domestic league appearances and goals as of 2 April 2026 ‡ National team caps and goals as of 10 June 2026

Fernán José Faerrón Tristán (born 22 August 2000) is a Costa Rican footballer who plays as a centre-back for the Costa Rica national team.

== Club career ==
=== Early years ===
Faerrón started playing football at the age of 11 in Cartago. He then played a year and a half at Deportivo Saprissa, before joining Fútbol Consultants Desamparados.

In 2017, 16-year-old Faerrón joined Belén FC's professional team in the Liga FPD, where he was on the bench for seven games, however, without making his debut. He then returned to Fútbol Consultants Desamparados, this time as a first team player.

=== Professional career ===
Returning to Fútbol Consultants Desamparados—formerly known as FC Moravia—in the summer of 2017, he made his first team debut for the club in the Costa Rican second division.

In May 2018, 17-year-old Faerrón went on a trial at Norwegian club Vålerenga Fotball. However, he was never offered a contract. Shortly after returning, 18-year-old Faerrón moved to the Austrian club LASK, where he played for six months.

Faerrón returned to Costa Rica in 2019, signing on loan for Santos Guápiles. He scored in his debut for the club on 17 February 2019 against C.S. Cartaginés.

On 5 January 2020, Faerrón joined Alajuelense on loan. In February 2021, Faerrón signed a new contract with the club until June 2025. After the contract extension, rumors began to flourish that Faerrón had begun to become unpopular in the squad and that he had been in discussions with some of the players in the squad. As the situation didn't get better, in the summer of 2021, there was talk that Faerrón was on his way out of the club. After the criticism of him in the media, Faerrón went out on social media and stated that he didn't want to leave the club and that the rumors were untrue. He wrote, among other things, that he, like all people, had made mistakes, but also that he had a strong character, which did not always benefit him.

On 7 January 2022, Alajuelense's sporting director revealed, that Faerrón was offered to join the B-team of the American club, Los Angeles Galaxy, in the summer of 2021, but rejected, as he wanted to stay at Alajuelense. He also stated, that Faerrón now had asked to leave the club, as he wanted to go play abroad. Five days later, on 14 January, the club confirmed that Faerrón had left the club, without specifying further.

On 21 February 2022 it was confirmed, that Faerrón had joined Norwegian Eliteserien club HamKam, on a one-year loan from Desamparados. After returning from the loan spell in January 2023, Faerrón signed with C.S. Herediano.

On 6 February 2025, Faerrón joined Ukrainian Premier League side FC Vorskla Poltava on a loan for the rest of the season with an option to buy. Due to the war in Ukraine, Faerron was forced to leave the country and consequently the club at the end of May 2025, as bombardments approached the city where Faerron and his family resided.

Faerrón returned to Herediano On 11 September 2025, Faerróns contract was terminated.

== International career ==
Faerrón was first called up to the Costa Rica national team in October 2021 for World Cup qualifiers against El Salvador and the United States. He remained on the bench in both games.

He made his debut on 2 February 2024 in a friendly against El Salvador.

== Career statistics ==
=== International ===
As of match played 10 June 2026

Appearances and goals by national team and year
National team	Year	Apps	Goals
Costa Rica	2024	3	0
Costa Rica	2025	5	0
Costa Rica	2026	3	0
Total		11	0
