= Tore André Sørås =

Norwegian footballer (born 1998)

Personal information
- Full name: Tore André Hagbø Sørås
- Date of birth: 18 June 1998 (age 28)
- Height: 1.90 m (6 ft 3 in)
- Position: Central midfielder

Team information
- Current team: KFUM
- Number: 27

Youth career
- –2013: Kolbotn
- 2014–2015: Follo

Senior career*
Years	Team	Apps	(Gls)
2016–2017	Follo	38	(2)
2017–2018	Viking	0	(0)
2018–2022	KFUM	94	(13)
2023–2025	Hamkam	71	(2)
2026–	KFUM	2	(0)
- * Club domestic league appearances and goals as of 15 April 2026

Tore André Sørås (born 18 June 1998) is a Norwegian footballer who plays as a midfielder for KFUM.

== Career ==
He hails from Tårnåsen and played for Kolbotn until the age of 16. He then joined the umbrella team in the region, Follo FK, where he made his senior debut in 2016. In July 2017 he trained with first-tier team Viking FK, for whom he signed. He failed to break through at Viking and was deemed surplus in 2018.

He left Viking in the summer of 2018 for promotion chasers in the 2. divisjon, KFUM. The team won promotion and established themselves in the 1. divisjon. Sørås being an integral part of that with over 100 games for KFUM (across all competitions). Having signed a new contract in 2022, Sørås was nonetheless allowed to progress to the Eliteserien after the season was over. He signed for Hamarkameratene. Making his Eliteserien debut in April 2023 against Sandefjord, he established himself in that team as well.

In 2025 he let his contract in Hamkam run out. As it turned out, he returned to KFUM, now an Eliteserien team.
