= Luc Mares =

Dutch footballer

Personal information
- Full name: Luc Katja Anne Mares
- Date of birth: 3 October 1996 (age 30)
- Place of birth: Maastricht, Netherlands
- Height: 1.75 m (5 ft 9 in)
- Position: Centre back

Team information
- Current team: HamKam
- Number: 14

Youth career
- VV RVU
- 2007–2015: Fortuna Sittard

Senior career*
Years	Team	Apps	(Gls)
2015–2017	Fortuna Sittard	54	(1)
2017–2021	MVV	118	(8)
2021–2024	Start	75	(6)
2024–	HamKam	60	(3)
- * Club domestic league appearances and goals as of 23 July 2026

Luc Mares (born 3 October 1996) is a Dutch professional footballer who plays as a centre back for HamKam in the Norwegian Eliteserien.

He previously played for Fortuna Sittard and MVV.
