= Halvor Rødølen Opsahl =

Norwegian footballer (born 2002)

Personal information
- Date of birth: 8 October 2002 (age 24)
- Position: Defender

Team information
- Current team: HamKam
- Number: 4

Youth career
- –2017: Roterud
- 2018–2020: Lillehammer

Senior career*
| Years | Team | Apps | (Gls) |
| 2019–2020 | Lillehammer | 8 | (0) |
| 2021– | HamKam | 73 | (1) |

International career^{‡}
| 2021 | Norway U19 | 1 | (0) |
| 2021– | Norway U20 | 4 | (0) |
- * Club domestic league appearances and goals as of 23 July 2026 ‡ National team caps and goals as of 19 November 2022

Halvor Rødølen Opsahl (born 8 October 2002) is a Norwegian footballer who plays as a defender for HamKam.

== Career ==
Opsahl played youth football at Roterud and Lillehammer, before starting his senior career with the latter in 2019. He moved to HamKam in 2021. On 10 April 2022, he made his Eliteserien debut in a 2–1 loss against Tromsø.

== Career statistics ==
As of match played on 23 July 2026

Club statistics
| Club | Season | League | | | National Cup | | Other | | Total | |
| Club | Season | Division | Apps | Goals | Apps | Goals | Apps | Goals | Apps | Goals |
|---|---|---|---|---|---|---|---|---|---|---|
| HamKam | 2021 | Norwegian First Division | 26 | 0 | 2 | 0 | — | | 28 | 0 |
| HamKam | 2022 | Eliteserien | 24 | 0 | 3 | 0 | — | | 27 | 0 |
| HamKam | 2023 | Eliteserien | 17 | 1 | 5 | 0 | — | | 22 | 1 |
| HamKam | 2024 | Eliteserien | 0 | 0 | 0 | 0 | — | | 0 | 0 |
| HamKam | 2026 | Eliteserien | 6 | 0 | 0 | 0 | — | | 6 | 0 |
| Career totals | | | 73 | 1 | 10 | 0 | 0 | 0 | 83 | 1 |
