= Kristian Lønstad Onsrud =

Norwegian footballer (born 1994)

Personal information
- Date of birth: 22 July 1994 (age 32)
- Height: 1.86 m (6 ft 1 in)
- Position: Midfielder

Team information
- Current team: Raufoss
- Number: 17

Youth career
- Gjøvik-Lyn

Senior career*
Years	Team	Apps	(Gls)
2012–2017	Raufoss	124	(23)
2018–2024	HamKam	196	(32)
2025–	Stabæk	26	(0)
2026–	→ Raufoss (loan)	10	(0)
- * Club domestic league appearances and goals as of 14 November 2026

Kristian Lønstad Onsrud (born 22 July 1994) is a Norwegian footballer who plays as a midfielder for Raufoss, on loan from Stabæk.

== Career ==
Onsrud played youth football at Gjøvik-Lyn, before starting his senior career with Raufoss in 2012. After six seasons with Raufoss, he moved to HamKam in 2018. On 2 April 2022, he made his Eliteserien debut in a 2–2 draw against Lillestrøm.

On 27 January 2025, Onsrud signed a two-year contract with Stabæk.
