= Moses Mawa =

Norwegian footballer (born 1996)

Personal information
- Full name: Moses Dramwi Mawa
- Date of birth: 4 August 1996 (age 30)
- Place of birth: Oslo, Norway
- Height: 1.85 m (6 ft 1 in)
- Position: Forward

Team information
- Current team: Sepsi OSK
- Number: 14

Youth career
- –2012: Oppsal
- 2013–2014: Holmlia

Senior career*
Years	Team	Apps	(Gls)
2015	Lyn	14	(6)
2016–2017	Bærum	50	(18)
2018–2019	KFUM	41	(23)
2019–2021	Strømsgodset	56	(10)
2021–2023	Kristiansund	31	(7)
2023–2026	HamKam	67	(12)
2026–	Sepsi OSK	26	(5)
- * Club domestic league appearances and goals as of 8 November 2026

Moses Dramwi Mawa (born 4 August 1996) is a Norwegian professional footballer who plays as a forward for Liga I club Sepsi OSK.

Born and raised in Oslo to South Sudanese parents, his grandfather ran a cross-border business in West Nile, northern Uganda, and married a Ugandan woman in Arua.

He is eligible to play for Uganda, South Sudan or Norway, but he is yet to get a breakthrough.

== Career ==
He played youth football for Oppsal and Holmlia before starting his senior career in Lyn. For the dormant former first-tier team he scored 6 goals in the 2015 2. divisjon. Lyn were relegated, and Mawa continued for two seasons in Bærum SK and one season in KFUM, who won promotion to the 2019 1. divisjon. Making his mark here with 10 goals in 15 matches, he was bought by Strømsgodset during the summer transfer window, and even scored on his debut against Bodø/Glimt. In August 2021, he moved to Kristiansund on a contract until the end of the 2024 season.

On 3 August 2023, Mawa moved to HamKam.

== Career statistics ==
=== Club ===
As of match played 8 November 2026

Appearances and goals by club, season and competition
Club	Season	League			National cup (Note: Includes Norwegian Cup, Cupa României)		Other		Total	
Club	Season	Division	Apps	Goals	Apps	Goals	Apps	Goals	Apps	Goals
Lyn	2015	2. divisjon	14	6	0	0	—		14	6
Bærum	2016	2. divisjon	26	12	2	0	—		28	12
Bærum	2017	2. divisjon	24	6	2	0	—		26	6
Bærum	Total		50	18	4	0	—		54	18
KFUM Oslo	2018	2. divisjon	26	13	3	2	4 (Note: Appearances in 1. divisjon promotion/relegation play-offs)	2	33	17
KFUM Oslo	2019	1. divisjon	15	10	3	3	—		18	13
KFUM Oslo	Total		41	23	6	5	4	2	51	30
Strømsgodset	2019	Eliteserien	14	4	0	0	—		14	4
Strømsgodset	2020	Eliteserien	30	6	—		—		30	6
Strømsgodset	2021	Eliteserien	12	0	1	0	—		13	0
Strømsgodset	Total		56	10	1	0	—		57	10
Kristiansund	2021	Eliteserien	15	5	2	0	—		17	5
Kristiansund	2022	Eliteserien	7	0	1	0	—		7	0
Kristiansund	2023	1. divisjon	9	2	2	0	—		11	2
Kristiansund	Total		31	7	5	0	—		36	7
HamKam	2023	Eliteserien	14	2	0	0	—		14	2
HamKam	2024	Eliteserien	27	6	2	0	—		29	6
HamKam	2025	Eliteserien	26	4	3	1	—		29	5
HamKam	Total		67	12	5	1	—		72	13
Sepsi OSK	2025–26	Liga II	14	5	1	0	—		15	5
Sepsi OSK	2026–27	Liga I	12	0	2	1	—		14	1
Sepsi OSK	Total		26	5	3	1	—		29	6
Career total			285	81	23	7	4	2	312	90
