= Elverum Fotball =

Norwegian association football club

Elverum
- Full name: Elverum Fotball
- Founded: 30 June 1907; 118 years ago
- Ground: Elverum stadion, Elverum
- Capacity: 2000
- Chairman: Henning Myrer
- Head coach: Stian Aasen
- League: 3. divisjon
- 2025: 3. divisjon group 3, 2nd of 14
- Website: www.elverumfotball.no
Home colours	Away colours

Elverum Fotball is the association football section of the sports club Elverum IL from Elverum, Norway. They compete in the 3. divisjon, the fourth tier in the Norwegian football league system.

== History ==
It was founded on 30 June 1907 under the name Elverum Footballklub.

Elverum played in the 2. divisjon for many years. In 1995, it won its group and was promoted to the 1996 1. divisjon, but was relegated after one year. Between 2000 and 2004, Elverum was relegated and promoted every other year; they played in the 3. divisjon from 2005 to 2010. Elverum won their 3. divisjon group in 2005 and 2006, but lost the playoff-promotion until they won the promotion-playoff in 2010 and returned to the 2. divisjon.

The club was promoted to the First Division again after the 2012 season, but was relegated after only one season back at the second tier.

In the 2016 season, Elverum once again gained promotion back to 1. divisjon.

In 2017, Elverum reached the Fourth round of the Cup for the first time in the club's history.

At the end of the 2017 season, they were once again relegated to the 2. divisjon.

== Recent history ==
Season	League	Grp.	Pos.	Pl.	W	D	L	GS	GA	P	Cup	Notes
2008	3. divisjon	7	3	22	13	5	4	83	34	44	1st qualifying round	
2009	3. divisjon	7	6	22	10	3	9	62	56	33	1st round	
2010	3. divisjon	7	↑ 1	22	17	1	4	61	20	52	2nd qualifying round	Promoted
2011	2. divisjon	2	4	24	12	6	6	38	26	42	1st round	
2012	2. divisjon	1	↑ 1	26	14	9	3	57	30	51	1st round	Promoted
2013	1. divisjon		↓ 16	30	3	6	21	37	67	15	Third round	Relegated
2014	2. divisjon	2	3	26	15	7	4	55	27	52	2nd round	
2015	2. divisjon	4	2	26	12	6	8	47	35	42	2nd round	
2016	2. divisjon	2	↑ 1	26	20	4	2	68	13	63	2nd round	Promoted
2017	1. divisjon		↓ 15	30	4	12	14	29	51	24	4th round	Relegated
2018	2. divisjon	1	6	26	12	8	6	53	39	44	2nd round	
2019	2. divisjon	2	↓ 12	26	7	5	14	34	46	26	2nd round	Relegated
2020	Season cancelled											
2021	3. divisjon	1	3	13	7	4	2	27	18	25	1st round	
2022	3. divisjon	2	3	26	16	7	3	64	34	55	2nd round	
2023	3. divisjon	2	3	26	16	4	6	67	41	52	1st round	
2024	3. divisjon	6	3	26	19	1	6	74	31	58	2nd round	
2025	3. divisjon	3	2	26	19	1	6	85	29	58	2nd round	
2026	3. divisjon	6									1st qualifying round	

== Stadium ==
Elverum Fotball play their home games at Elverum Stadion, also known as Sentralidrettsplassen, which was inaugurated in 1950. In 2007, the stadium was upgraded with floodlight and artificial grass before once again being updated ahead of the 2013 season when they returned to the First Division. The highest home attendance was 4,633, in 1991, when local rivals Ham-Kam visited Elverum in a league game.

== Statistics ==
- Greatest victory: 12–0 against Nordre Trysil in 1954 and against Lom in 2001.
- Highest home attendance: 4,633 in a league game against Ham-Kam in 1991.
- Best league position: 5th in the First Division, 1992.
- Best cup result: 4th round in 2017.

== Famous players ==
- Vegar Eggen Hedenstad, now Rosenborg
- Eirik Dybendahl, now IFK Norrköping
- Stig Inge Bjørnebye, former Liverpool F.C. and Blackburn Rovers
- Ole Petter Skonnord, former Dundee FC
- Terje Olsen, former Bayer Leverkusen
- Svein Skårås, former Kvik Halden
