= Jakob Michelsen =

Danish football manager (born 1980)

Personal information
- Full name: Jakob Saldern Stein Michelsen
- Date of birth: 30 September 1980 (age 46)
- Place of birth: Tønder, Denmark

Managerial career
- Years: Team
- 1994–2001: Tønder SF (youth)
- 2001–2004: Kolding FC (youth)
- 2005–2007: IK Skovbakken (youth)
- 2007–2009: IK Skovbakken (women)
- 2009–2010: IK Skovbakken
- 2011–2012: Hobro IK
- 2012–2013: Tanzania U19
- 2014–2015: Skive IK
- 2015–2017: SønderjyskE
- 2017–2018: Hammarby IF
- 2018–2021: OB
- 2022–2025: HamKam
- 2025–: Denmark women

Jakob Saldern Stein Michelsen (born 30 September 1980) is a Danish football manager.

Michelsen was selected coach of the year in Denmark in 2015. He was the coach behind the sensational silver medals for SønderjyskE in 2016 and the good run in Euro League for the club. In November 2016 the Swedish club Hammarby bought him out of his contract with Sønderjyske. In January 2018 Hammarby and Jakob Michelsen separated ways after different opinion about the strategy in the future. Jakob Michelsen is known for his good tactical skills and his management skills, where he is known for good people skills. His nickname is Mini Mourinho.

== Managerial career ==
=== Denmark ===
His career started by coaching TM Tønder's team of 10-year-old boys. He later coached youth teams at Kolding FC and IK Skovbakken, and in 2007 he became head coach of the women team of IK Skovbakken playing in the Danish top tier, Elitedivisionen.

In January 2009, Michelsen became new manager of IK Skovbakken's senior male team i the Denmark Series. He managed the club to a promotion to the Danish 2nd Divisions in 2010. Because of his success at Skovbakken he was hired as new manager of the Danish 1st Division team Hobro IK in January 2011.

Following one and a half year good years at Hobro, Michelsen was brought to Tanzania to coach the Tanzania national U17 and U20 team by fellow Dane Kim Poulsen in 2012. In March 2014 he returned to Denmark to manage Skive IK.

In Skive, Michelsen took the 2 division team up into 1 division and underway the team made a Danish record with 18 consecutive wins.

In July 2015, Michelsen replaced Lars Søndergaard as manager of SønderjyskE in the Danish Superliga. after Sønderjyske bought him out of his contract in Skive. In his first season, he took the SønderjyskE into new successful heights and was the coach behind the club's historical 2nd place in the 2015–16 Danish Superliga. He was later named "coach of the year" in 2015 by the Danish Football Association.

Michelsen has been called the "mini Mourinho", as a homage to the Portuguese manager José Mourinho, because of his good tactical skills.

=== Sweden ===
On 30 November 2016, Michelsen agreed terms with Swedish side Hammarby, signing a three-year deal, and effectively joined his new club on 1 January 2017. Hammarby had a promising first half of the 2017 Allsvenskan season, claiming the 6th place in the table after 12 games. During the spring, Hammarby also won both fixtures against fierce rivals AIK (2–1) and Djurgården (3–1). In the second half of the campaign, Hammarby struggled to produce any sort of challenge in the league, and subsequently dropped of in the table. Both manager Jacob Michelsen and several of the players suffered criticism from supporters and pundits as the club eventually finished 9th in Allsvenskan.

On 4 January 2018, the board and director of football Jesper Jansson, announced that Hammarby had sacked Michelsen, citing differences regarding the view on transfers and playing style, as well as a disappointing development of the team and its results.

=== Norway ===
On 9 January 2022, Michelsen was appointed manager of Norwegian Eliteserien club HamKam.

=== Women's National Team ===
On 4 June 2025, the Danish Football Association presented Michelsen as the new manager for the Denmark women's national team. Michelsen assumed the role on 1 August 2025, following Denmark's participation in the UEFA Women's Euro 2025.
