= 2025 Fredrikstad FK season =

Fredrikstad
2025 season
- Chairman: Jostein Lunde
- Head coach: Andreas Hagen
- Stadium: Fredrikstad Stadion
- Eliteserien: 8th
- 2025 Norwegian Cup: Fourth round
- UEFA Europa League: Third qualifying round
- UEFA Conference League: Play-off round
- 2025–26 Norwegian Cup: Advanced to Fourth round
- Top goalscorer: League: Oskar Øhlenschlæger (6); All: Henrik Skogvold; Oskar Øhlenschlæger (7 goals each)
- Highest home attendance: 12,565 (vs Sarpsborg 08, Eliteserien, 1 June 2025)
- Lowest home attendance: 6,760 (vs. Kristiansund, Eliteserien, 2 November 2025)
- Average home league attendance: 9,166
- Biggest win: 5–0 vs Flint (A); Norwegian Cup, 24 April 2025
- Biggest defeat: 0–5 vs Bodø/Glimt (A); Eliteserien, 30 November 2025
Home colours	Away colours	Third colours

The 2025 season is the 122nd season in the history of Fredrikstad FK and their 2nd consecutive season in the top flight of Norwegian football. In addition to the Eliteserien and the Norwegian Football Cup, Fredrikstad will participate in the 2025–26 UEFA Europa League.

== Squad ==
As of 31 December 2025

No.	Player	Nationality	Date of birth (age)	Signed from	Signed in	Contract ends	Apps	Goals
Goalkeepers
1	Øystein Øvretveit	(Norway)	25 June 1994 (aged 31)	(Norway) Jerv	2025	2026	3	0
25	Ole Langbråten	(Norway)	7 July 2003 (aged 22)	(Norway) Academy	2021	2025	1	0
77	Martin Børsheim	(Norway)	18 February 2005 (aged 20)	(Norway) Brann	2025	2029	17	0
90	Valdemar Birksø	(Denmark)	17 March 2001 (aged 24)	(Denmark) Fredericia	2025	2029	1	0
Defenders
2	Kennedy Okpaleke	(Sweden)	16 November 2008 (aged 17)	(Sweden) Lindome GIF	2025	2027	6	0
4	Stian Stray Molde	(Norway)	19 December 1996 (aged 29)	(Norway) Asker	2019	2025	196	16
5	Simen Rafn	(Norway)	16 February 1992 (aged 33)	(Norway) Aalesund	2023	2026	226	8
12	Ulrik Fredriksen	(Norway)	17 June 1999 (aged 26)	(Norway) Haugesund	2025	2026	38	2
16	Daniel Eid	(Norway)	14 October 1998 (aged 27)	(Norway) Sogndal	2024	2027	54	3
17	Sigurd Kvile (captain)	(Norway)	26 February 2000 (aged 25)	(Norway) Bodø/Glimt	2023	2026	46	1
18	Ludvig Begby	(Norway)	1 April 1997 (aged 28)	(Norway) Academy	2013	2025	244	23
21	Fanuel Ghebreyohannes	(Norway)	3 December 2006 (aged 19)	(Norway) Egersund	2025	2029	2	0
22	Maxwell Woledzi	(Ghana)	2 July 2001 (aged 24)	(Portugal) Vitória de Guimarães	2023	2026	88	0
28	Solomon Owusu	(Ghana)	28 October 1995 (aged 30)	(Norway) Odd	2025	2025	14	0
32	Jesper Solberg	(Norway)	6 February 2008 (aged 17)	(Norway) Academy	2023	2026	1	0
Midfielders
6	Leonard Owusu	(Ghana)	3 June 1997 (aged 28)	(Serbia) Partizan	2025	2025	35	2
7	Benjamin Faraas	(Norway)	8 September 2005 (aged 20)	(Belgium) Club NXT	2025	2028	13	3
9	Salim Laghzaoui	(Morocco)	7 November 2005 (aged 20)	(Norway) Lyn	2025	2030	7	0
11	Patrick Metcalfe	(Canada)	11 November 1998 (aged 27)	(Norway) Stabæk	2023	2025	105	3
13	Sondre Sørløkk	(Norway)	8 May 1997 (aged 28)	(Norway) Ull/Kisa	2023	2027	87	14
14	Jóannes Bjartalíð	(Faroe Islands)	10 July 1996 (aged 29)	(Faroe Islands) KÍ	2023	2025	66	15
19	Rocco Robert Shein	(Estonia)	14 July 2003 (aged 22)	(Netherlands) Dordrecht	2025	2028	36	2
20	Oskar Øhlenschlæger	(Denmark)	19 April 2004 (aged 21)	(Denmark) Vendsyssel	2025	2028	35	7
24	Torjus Engebakken	(Norway)	20 December 2006 (aged 19)	(Norway) Raufoss	2024	2028	3	0
31	Elias Solberg	(Norway)	6 February 2008 (aged 17)	(Norway) Academy	2023	2026	7	1
40	Eirik Granaas	(Norway)	24 March 2010 (aged 15)	(Norway) Academy	2025	2027	8	0
Forwards
10	Johannes Nuñez	(Norway)	14 December 1996 (aged 29)	(Norway) KFUM Oslo	2025	2028	6	2
23	Henrik Skogvold	(Norway)	14 July 2004 (aged 21)	(Norway) Lillestrøm	2024	2028	53	9

=== New contracts ===
Date	Pos.	No.	Player	Until	Ref.
11 March 2025	MF	11	(Canada) Patrick Metcalfe	2025	
23 April 2025	MF	13	(Norway) Sondre Sørløkk	2027	
9 September 2025	GK	25	(Norway) Ole Langbråten	2026	
8 October 2025	DF	5	(Norway) Simen Rafn	2026	

== Pre-season and friendlies ==
25 January 2025 Friendly	Brøndby (Denmark)	2–0	(Norway) Fredrikstad	Brøndbyvester, Denmark
16:00 CET (UTC+1)	Bischoff 8'; Suzuki 92'	Report		Stadium: Brøndby Stadion

30 January 2025 Friendly	Fredrikstad (Norway)	1–1	(Canada) Toronto FC	Benahavís, Spain
15:00 CET (UTC+1)	Traoré 119'	Report	Rigopoulos 47'	Stadium: Campo La Quinta

4 February 2025 Friendly	IF Brommapojkarna (Sweden)	1–0	(Norway) Fredrikstad	Benahavís, Spain
16:00 CET (UTC+1)	Irandust 71'	Report		Stadium: Campo La Quinta

7 February 2025 Friendly	Fredrikstad (Norway)	0–1	(Sweden) Häcken	San Pedro Alcántara, Spain
17:00 CET (UTC+1)		Report	Hrstić 57'	Stadium: Marbella Football Center

15 February 2025 Friendly	Sandefjord	2–2	Fredrikstad	Sandefjord
14:00 CET (UTC+1)	Jemal 17'; Tibell 43'	Report	Stray Molde 21'; Faraas 67'	Stadium: Jotun Arena

21 February 2025 Friendly	HamKam	0–1	Fredrikstad	Lillestrøm
12:15 CET (UTC+1)		Report	Stray Molde 66'	Stadium: LSK-Hallen

1 March 2025 Friendly	Viking	2–0	Fredrikstad	Stavanger
12:30 CET (UTC+1)	Falchener 4'; Cappis 38'	Report		Stadium: Viking Stadion

8 March 2025 Friendly	Fredrikstad	0–1	KFUM Oslo	Fredrikstad
14:00 CET (UTC+1)		Report	Tønnessen 7'	Stadium: Fredrikstad Stadion

15 March 2025 Friendly	Fredrikstad	1–2	Strømsgodset	Fredrikstad
14:00 CET (UTC+1)	Rafn 70'	Report	Mehnert 14'; Therkelsen 39'	Stadium: Fredrikstad Stadion

22 March 2025 Friendly	Fredrikstad	1–0	Lillestrøm	Fredrikstad
15:00 CET (UTC+1)	Holten 6' (pen.)	Report		Stadium: Fredrikstad Stadion

== Competitions ==
=== Overview ===
Competition	First match	Last match	Starting round	Final position	Record							
Competition	First match	Last match	Starting round	Final position	Pld	W	D	L	GF	GA	GD	Win %
Eliteserien	29 March 2025	30 November 2025	Matchday 1	8th	30	11	9	10	38	35	+3	36.67
2025 Norwegian Cup	12 April 2025	21 May 2025	First round	Fourth round	4	3	1	0	13	2	+11	75.00
UEFA Europa League	7 August 2025	14 August 2025	Third round	Third round	2	0	0	2	1	5	−4	0.00
UEFA Conference League	21 August 2025	28 August 2025	Play-off round	Play-off round	2	0	1	1	0	1	−1	0.00
2025–26 Norwegian Cup	23 September 2025	See 2026 season	Third round	See 2026 season	1	1	0	0	2	1	+1	100.00
Total					39	15	11	13	54	44	+10	38.46

Source: Competitions

=== Eliteserien ===
==== League table ====
Pos	Team	Pld	W	D	L	GF	GA	GD	Pts
6	Vålerenga	30	13	4	13	49	50	−1	43
7	Rosenborg	30	11	9	10	45	42	+3	42
8	Fredrikstad	30	11	9	10	38	35	+3	42
9	Sarpsborg 08	30	11	8	11	48	50	−2	41
10	Molde	30	12	3	15	46	42	+4	39

Source: Football Association of Norway (in Norwegian)
Rules for classification: 1) Points; 2) Goal difference; 3) Goals scored; 4) Head-to-head points; 5) Head-to-head goal difference; 6) Head-to-head goals scored.

==== Results summary ====
Overall								Home						Away					
Pld	W	D	L	GF	GA	GD	Pts	W	D	L	GF	GA	GD	W	D	L	GF	GA	GD
30	11	9	10	38	35	+3	42	7	4	4	24	16	+8	4	5	6	14	19	−5

==== Results by round ====
Round	1	2	3	4	5	6	7	8	9	10	11	12	13	14	15	16	17	18	19	20	21	22	23	24	25	26	27	28	29	30
Ground	H	A	H	A	H	A	H	A	H	A	H	A	H	A	H	A	H	H	H	A	H	A	A	H	A	A	H	A	H	A
Result	W	L	W	D	L	W	W	L	D	L	L	D	W	D	W	D	W	L	D	W	D	L	L	D	W	D	W	W	L	L
Position	1	6	4	4	8	7	5	6	7	9	10	10	8	8	8	8	7	8	10	10	6	6	8	10	7	7	6	5	7	8

Source: NIFS
A = Away; H = Home; W = Win; D = Draw; L = Loss

==== Matches ====
The match schedule was announced on 20 December 2024.

29 March 2025 1	Fredrikstad	3–0	Brann	Fredrikstad
18:00 CET (UTC+1)	Holten 10'; Kornvig 23' (o.g.); Skogvold 83'	Report	De Roeve (yellow card) 56'	Stadium: Fredrikstad Stadion; Attendance: 10,788; Referee: Tore Hansen

5 April 2025 2	Rosenborg	1–0	Fredrikstad	Trondheim
18:00 CEST (UTC+2)	Nypan 39'; E. Ceïde (yellow card) 90+7'	Report	Fall (yellow card) 90+4'	Stadium: Lerkendal Stadion; Attendance: 16,325; Referee: Rohit Saggi

9 April 2025 17	Fredrikstad	2–0	Vålerenga	Fredrikstad
19:00 CEST (UTC+2)	Fall (yellow card) 17', (goal) 39'; Holten 76' (pen.); Woledzi (yellow card) 72'	Report	Bjørdal (yellow card) 43'; Rijks (yellow card) 59'; Riisnæs (yellow card) 90+4'	Stadium: Fredrikstad Stadion; Attendance: 10,010; Referee: Marius Hansen Grøtta
Note: Fixture was initially scheduled on 9 or 10 August, but was moved because of Fredrikstad's involvement in the 2025–26 UEFA Europa League qualifying.

21 April 2025 3	Fredrikstad	3–1	Sandefjord	Fredrikstad
17:00 CEST (UTC+2)	Øhlenschlæger 15', 37'; Holten 45+1' (pen.); Woledzi (yellow card) 69'	Report	Kristiansen 44'; Ottosson (yellow card) 45+3'; Smajlović (yellow card) 86'	Stadium: Fredrikstad Stadion; Attendance: 8,880; Referee: Daniel Higraff

27 April 2025 4	Haugesund	0–0	Fredrikstad	Haugesund
17:00 CEST (UTC+2)	Fischer (yellow card) 45'; Petcho (yellow card) 90+2'	Report	Fredriksen (yellow card) 38'; Fall (yellow card) 73'	Stadium: Haugesund Stadion; Attendance: 3,058; Referee: Eivind Bodding

11 May 2025 6	Kristiansund	0–1	Fredrikstad	Kristiansund
17:00 CEST (UTC+2)	Corlu (yellow card) 73'; Isah (yellow card) 76'	Report	Øhlenschlæger (yellow card) 38'; Stray Molde 71'; Eid (yellow card) 88'; Owusu (yellow card) 90+3'	Stadium: Nordmøre Stadion; Attendance: 3,007; Referee: Svein Tore Sinnes

16 May 2025 7	Fredrikstad	1–0	KFUM Oslo	Fredrikstad
18:00 CEST (UTC+2)	Sørløkk 5'; Fall (yellow card) 53'	Report	Sandal (yellow card) 34'; Okeke (yellow card) 53'	Stadium: Fredrikstad Stadion; Attendance: 11,578; Referee: Sivert Øksnes Amland

24 May 2025 8	Bryne	4–3	Fredrikstad	Bryne
16:00 CEST (UTC+2)	Moreira 1'; Skaret 13' (o.g.); Sødal (yellow card) 24'; Bojadzic 73'; Strunck 74'	Report	Metcalfe 26'; Sørløkk 33'; Faraas 88'	Stadium: Bryne Stadion; Attendance: 2,329; Referee: Marius Lien

28 May 2025 18	Fredrikstad	0–2	Rosenborg	Fredrikstad
19:00 CEST (UTC+2)		Report	Sæter 24'; Þorvaldsson (yellow card) 85'; Broholm 90+3'; Selnæs (yellow card) 90+5'	Stadium: Fredrikstad Stadion; Attendance: 9,528; Referee: Espen Eskås
Note: Fixture was initially scheduled on 16 or 17 August, but was moved because of Fredrikstad's involvement in the 2025–26 UEFA Europa League qualifying.

1 June 2025 9	Fredrikstad	1–1	Sarpsborg 08	Fredrikstad
14:30 CEST (UTC+2)	Shein (yellow card) 21'; Øhlenschlæger (yellow card) 45'; Sørløkk 79'; Owusu (yellow card)	Report	Kock (yellow card) 72'; Karlsbakk 90+11', (yellow card) 90+12'	Stadium: Fredrikstad Stadion; Attendance: 12,565; Referee: Tore Hansen

22 June 2025 10	Viking	3–0	Fredrikstad	Stavanger
19:15 CEST (UTC+2)	Bærtelsen 8'; Auklend (yellow card) 55', (goal) 80'; Tripić (yellow card) 57'; Christiansen 60'	Report	Øhlenschlæger (yellow card) 71'	Stadium: Viking Stadion; Attendance: 13,566; Referee: Mathias Støfringshaug

29 June 2025 11	Fredrikstad	0–1	Tromsø	Fredrikstad
17:00 CEST (UTC+2)	Holten (yellow card) 45+1'	Report	Camões 10'; Haugaard (yellow card) 74'	Stadium: Fredrikstad Stadion; Attendance: 7,500; Referee: Eivind Bodding

5 July 2025 12	Vålerenga	1–1	Fredrikstad	Oslo
18:00 CEST (UTC+2)	Strand 45'	Report	Shein 4'; Owusu (yellow card) 26'; Eid (yellow card) 39'; Metcalfe (yellow card) 89'	Stadium: Intility Arena; Attendance: 10,563; Referee: Daniel Higraff

12 July 2025 13	Fredrikstad	4–2	Molde	Fredrikstad
18:00 CEST (UTC+2)	Owusu (yellow card) 9'; Haugan 81' (o.g.); Øhlenschlæger 85', 88'; Daga 90+9' (o.g.)	Report	Hestad 5'; Kaasa (yellow card) 44'; Rafn 65' (o.g.); Kabini (yellow card) 85'; Haugan (yellow card) 90+8'	Stadium: Fredrikstad Stadion; Attendance: 8,384; Referee: Ola Hobber Nilsen

16 July 2025 5	Fredrikstad	0–1	Bodø/Glimt	Fredrikstad
18:00 CEST (UTC+2)		Report	Aleesami 87'; Riisnæs (yellow card) 90+1'	Stadium: Fredrikstad Stadion; Attendance: 10,025; Referee: Rohit Saggi
Note: Fixture was initially scheduled on 1 May, but was moved because of Bodø/Glimt's involvement in the 2024–25 UEFA Europa League.

20 July 2025 14	HamKam	1–1	Fredrikstad	Hamar
19:15 CEST (UTC+2)	Lien 12'	Report	Fredriksen 90+2'; Owusu (yellow card) 90+8'	Stadium: Briskeby Stadion; Attendance: 4,018; Referee: Espen Eskås

25 July 2025 15	Fredrikstad	3–2	Strømsgodset	Fredrikstad
19:00 CEST (UTC+2)	Conteh 14' (o.g.); Sørløkk 45+4'; Woledzi (yellow card) 78'; Holten 88'	Report	Bakke 39', (yellow card) 45'; Krasniqi 74'	Stadium: Fredrikstad Stadion; Attendance: 8,545; Referee: Sigurd Smehus Kringstad

2 August 2025 16	Tromsø	0–0	Fredrikstad	Tromsø
16:00 CEST (UTC+2)		Report	Skogvold (yellow card) 25'; Øhlenschlæger (yellow card) 72'; Bjartalíð (yellow card) 87'; Holten (yellow card) 90+2'	Stadium: Romssa Arena; Attendance: 5,017; Referee: Kristoffer Hagenes

31 August 2025 19	Fredrikstad	2–2	Haugesund	Fredrikstad
17:00 CEST (UTC+2)	Skogvold 2'; Nuñez 25'; Shein (yellow card) 35'; Eid (yellow card) 90+5'	Report	Hope 8'; Metcalfe 37' (o.g.); Leite (yellow card) 90+1'	Stadium: Fredrikstad Stadion; Attendance: 7,149; Referee: Marius Hansen Grøtta

13 September 2025 20	Molde	1–2	Fredrikstad	Molde
16:00 CEST (UTC+2)	Haugan (yellow card) 35'; Abdullai (yellow card) 45+6'; Gulbrandsen 90'	Report	Stray Molde 28'; Øhlenschlæger 45'; Børsheim (yellow card) 60'; Eid (yellow card) 90+2'	Stadium: Aker Stadion; Attendance: 5,798; Referee: Daniel Higraff

20 September 2025 21	Fredrikstad	1–1	Bryne	Fredrikstad
14:00 CEST (UTC+2)	Nuñez 25' (pen.)	Report	Steffensen (yellow card) 14'; Wik (yellow card) 41'; Skovgaard (yellow card) 58'; Bojadzic 88'	Stadium: Fredrikstad Stadion; Attendance: 7,074; Referee: Marius Waskaas Lien

28 September 2025 22	Brann	1–0	Fredrikstad	Bergen
14:30 CEST (UTC+2)	Kornvig 35'	Report	Børsheim (yellow card) 77'	Stadium: Brann Stadion; Attendance: 15,932; Referee: Tore Hansen

1 October 2025 23	KFUM Oslo	2–1	Fredrikstad	Oslo
19:00 CEST (UTC+2)	Gyedu 28'; B. Njie 41'; Berglie (yellow card) 56'; Tønnessen (yellow card) 89'	Report	Shein (yellow card) 82'; Sørløkk 90+3'	Stadium: KFUM Arena; Attendance: 1,539; Referee: Marius Hansen Grøtta

5 October 2025 24	Fredrikstad	1–1	HamKam	Fredrikstad
17:00 CEST (UTC+2)	L. Owusu 71'	Report	Ibrahimaj 44'; Osnes-Ringen (yellow card) 54'	Stadium: Fredrikstad Stadion; Attendance: 8,018; Referee: Stian Røvig Sletner

19 October 2025 25	Strømsgodset	0–3	Fredrikstad	Drammen
19:15 CEST (UTC+2)		Report	Skogvold (yellow card) 64', (goal) 77'; Øhlenschlæger 67'; Fredriksen 70'	Stadium: Marienlyst Stadion; Attendance: 4,389; Referee: Daniel Higraff

26 October 2025 26	Sandefjord	0–0	Fredrikstad	Sandefjord
17:00 CET (UTC+1)		Report		Stadium: Sandefjord Arena; Attendance: 5,935; Referee: Christian Moen

2 November 2025 27	Fredrikstad	3–1	Kristiansund	Fredrikstad
17:00 CET (UTC+1)	Bjartalíð 24' (pen.); Skogvold 56', 74'; Øhlenschlæger (yellow card) 62'	Report	Corlu 31'; Ødegård (yellow card) 45+1'; Hoffmann (yellow card) 90+5'	Stadium: Fredrikstad Stadion; Attendance: 6,760; Referee: Ola Hobber Nilsen

8 November 2025 28	Sarpsborg 08	0–2	Fredrikstad	Sarpsborg
14:00 CET (UTC+1)	Berget (yellow card) 70'; Wichne (yellow card) 90+8'	Report	Eid 53', (yellow card) 69'; Fredriksen (yellow card) 55'; Øhlenschlæger (yellow card) 78'; Owusu 87'	Stadium: Sarpsborg Stadion; Attendance: 8,022; Referee: Daniel Higraff

23 November 2025 29	Fredrikstad	0–1	Viking	Fredrikstad
19:15 CET (UTC+1)	L. Owusu (yellow card) 36'; Woledzi (yellow card) 56'; Shein (yellow card) 60'; Øhlenschlæger (yellow card) 89'; Bjartalíð (yellow card) 90+1'; S. Owusu (yellow card) 87'	Report	Falchener (yellow card) 64', (goal) 72'; Kvia-Egeskog (yellow card) 89'; Haugen (yellow card) 90+8'	Stadium: Fredrikstad Stadion; Attendance: 10,689; Referee: Sigurd Smehus Kringstad

30 November 2025 30	Bodø/Glimt	5–0	Fredrikstad	Bodø
17:00 CET (UTC+1)	Hauge 38'; Bjørkan 42'; Blomberg 45+2'; Helmersen 61'; Jørgensen 73'	Report	Øhlenschlæger (yellow card) 20'; Granaas (yellow card) 90+2'	Stadium: Aspmyra Stadion; Attendance: 6,596; Referee: Marius Hansen Grøtta

=== Norwegian Cup ===
==== 2025 Norwegian Cup ====
12 April 2025 First round	Sarpsborg FK	0–4	Fredrikstad	Sarpsborg
16:00 CEST (UTC+2)	Jansen (yellow card) 45+1'; Andersen (red card) 52'; Pettersen (yellow card) 61'; Olavsen (yellow card) 79'	Report	Skogvold 4'; Faraas 53' (pen.); Hanstad 54', 77'; Skaret (yellow card) 81'	Stadium: Kurland kunstgress Referee: Anders Bodding

24 April 2025 Second round	Flint	0–5	Fredrikstad	Tønsberg
18:00 CEST (UTC+2)		Report	Fall 2'; Skaret 28'; Hanstad 31'; Shein 82'; Faraas 86'	Stadium: Flint ESSO Arena; Attendance: 1,050; Referee: Harald Vollstad Sletner

7 May 2025 Third round	Pors	1–3	Fredrikstad	Porsgrunn
18:00 CEST (UTC+2)	Mladenovic (yellow card) 48'; Henriksrud 50'; Garstad (yellow card) 65'	Report	Holten 22', 65' (pen.); Eid 77'; Øhlenschlæger (yellow card) 79'	Stadium: Pors Stadion; Referee: Magnus Nicolai Koløy

21 May 2025 Fourth round	Lillestrøm	1–1 (a.e.t.) (3–1 p)	Fredrikstad	Lillestrøm
19:00 CEST (UTC+2)	Lehne Olsen 13'; Krygård (yellow card) 69'; Karlsbakk (yellow card) 84'; Elkær (yellow card) 93'	Report	Stray Molde 50'; Sørløkk (yellow card) 67'; Eid (yellow card) 74'	Stadium: Åråsen Stadion; Attendance: 4,077; Referee: Ola Hobber Nilsen
	Penalties
	Karlsbakk (penalty scored); Krygård (penalty scored); Gabrielsen (penalty scored); Kitolano (penalty missed)		(penalty missed) Holten; (penalty scored) Øhlenschlæger; (penalty missed) Eid; (penalty missed) Sørløkk

==== 2025–26 Norwegian Cup ====
23 September 2025 Third round	Vålerenga	1–2	Fredrikstad	Oslo
18:00 CEST (UTC+2)	Strand 90+7'; Tshiembe (yellow card) 90+7'	Report	Eid 20'; Bjartalíð (yellow card) 82'; Rafn (yellow card) 90'; S. Owusu (yellow card) 90+5'; Skogvold 90+8'	Stadium: Intility Arena; Attendance: 6,540; Referee: Sivert Øksnes Amland

The remaining rounds took place during the 2026 season.

=== UEFA Europa League ===
==== Third qualifying round ====
7 August 2025 First leg	Fredrikstad (Norway)	1–3	(Denmark) Midtjylland	Fredrikstad, Norway
18:00 CEST (UTC+2)	Bjartalíð 77'	Report	Djú 14'; Gogorza 32'; Castillo 79'; Lee (yellow card) 82'	Stadium: Fredrikstad Stadion; Attendance: 8,779; Referee: Igor Pajač (Croatia)

14 August 2025 Second leg	Midtjylland (Denmark)	2–0 (5–1 agg.)	(Norway) Fredrikstad	Herning, Denmark
18:00 CEST (UTC+2)	Bech 9'; Paulinho 17'; Gabriel (yellow card) 85'	Report	Molde (yellow card) 89'	Stadium: MCH Arena; Attendance: 8,464; Referee: Julian Weinberger (Austria)

=== UEFA Conference League ===
==== Play-off round ====
21 August 2025 First leg	Crystal Palace (England)	1–0	(Norway) Fredrikstad	London, England
20:00 BST (UTC+1)	Mateta 54'	Report	Fredriksen (yellow card) 62'; Eid (yellow card) 74'	Stadium: Selhurst Park; Attendance: 23,013; Referee: Anastasios Papapetrou (Greece)

28 August 2025 Second leg	Fredrikstad (Norway)	0–0 (0–1 agg.)	(England) Crystal Palace	Fredrikstad, Norway
19:00 CEST (UTC+2)	L. Owusu (yellow card) 67'; Øhlenschlæger (yellow card) 71'; Woledzi (yellow card) 87'	Report	Mateta (yellow card) 23'; Sosa (yellow card) 47'	Stadium: Fredrikstad Stadion; Attendance: 10,016; Referee: Kristo Tohver (Estonia)

== Squad statistics ==
=== Appearances and goals ===
Players with no appearances are not included on the list.

No.	Pos	Nat	Player	Total		Eliteserien		2025 Norwegian Cup		Europa League		Conference League		2025–26 Norwegian Cup	
No.	Pos	Nat	Player	Apps	Goals	Apps	Goals	Apps	Goals	Apps	Goals	Apps	Goals	Apps	Goals
1	GK	(Norway) NOR	Øystein Øvretveit	3	0	0	0	3	0	0	0	0	0	0	0
2	DF	(Sweden) SWE	Kennedy Okpaleke	6	0	6	0	0	0	0	0	0	0	0	0
3	DF	(Norway) NOR	Brage Skaret	12	1	8	0	4	1	0	0	0	0	0	0
4	DF	(Norway) NOR	Stian Stray Molde	32	3	25	2	2	1	2	0	2	0	1	0
5	DF	(Norway) NOR	Simen Rafn	31	0	24	0	4	0	2	0	0	0	1	0
6	MF	(Ghana) GHA	Leonard Owusu	35	2	29	2	1	0	2	0	2	0	1	0
7	MF	(Norway) NOR	Benjamin Faraas	13	3	9	1	4	2	0	0	0	0	0	0
9 (Note: Holten wore number 9 until his departure on 5 September 2025. Laghzaoui replaced him as number 9.)	FW	(Denmark) DEN	Emil Holten	24	6	18	4	2	2	2	0	2	0	0	0
9	MF	(Morocco) MAR	Salim Laghzaoui	7	0	6	0	0	0	0	0	0	0	1	0
10	FW	(Norway) NOR	Johannes Nuñez	6	2	4	2	0	0	0	0	2	0	0	0
11	MF	(Canada) CAN	Patrick Metcalfe	35	1	26	1	4	0	2	0	2	0	1	0
12	DF	(Norway) NOR	Ulrik Fredriksen	38	2	30	2	3	0	2	0	2	0	1	0
13	MF	(Norway) NOR	Sondre Sørløkk	38	5	29	5	4	0	2	0	2	0	1	0
14	FW	(Faroe Islands) FRO	Jóannes Bjartalíð	22	2	17	1	0	0	2	1	2	0	1	0
15	DF	(Senegal) SEN	Fallou Fall	12	2	10	1	2	1	0	0	0	0	0	0
16	DF	(Norway) NOR	Daniel Eid	36	3	28	1	3	1	2	0	2	0	1	1
17	DF	(Norway) NOR	Sigurd Kvile	11	0	9	0	0	0	0	0	2	0	0	0
18	DF	(Norway) NOR	Ludvig Begby	17	0	13	0	4	0	0	0	0	0	0	0
19	MF	(Estonia) EST	Rocco Robert Shein	36	2	28	1	3	1	2	0	2	0	1	0
20	MF	(Denmark) DEN	Oskar Øhlenschlæger	35	7	28	6	2	1	2	0	2	0	1	0
21 (Note: Hanstad wore number 21 until his departure on 28 July 2025. Ghebreyohannes replaced him as number 21.)	MF	(Norway) NOR	Jacob Hanstad	5	3	2	0	3	3	0	0	0	0	0	0
21	DF	(Norway) NOR	Fanuel Ghebreyohannes	2	0	2	0	0	0	0	0	0	0	0	0
22	DF	(Ghana) GHA	Maxwell Woledzi	38	0	29	0	4	0	2	0	2	0	1	0
23	FW	(Norway) NOR	Henrik Skogvold	38	7	30	5	3	1	2	0	2	0	1	1
24	MF	(Norway) NOR	Torjus Engebakken	2	0	0	0	2	0	0	0	0	0	0	0
28 (Note: Bech Hermansen wore number 28 until his loan on 14 April 2025. Owusu replaced him as number 28.)	DF	(Norway) NOR	Imre Bech Hermansen	1	0	0	0	1	0	0	0	0	0	0	0
28	DF	(Ghana) GHA	Solomon Owusu	14	0	9	0	0	0	2	0	2	0	1	0
30	GK	(Denmark) DEN	Jonathan Fischer	18	0	17	0	1	0	0	0	0	0	0	0
31	MF	(Norway) NOR	Elias Solberg	4	0	2	0	2	0	0	0	0	0	0	0
32	DF	(Norway) NOR	Jesper Solberg	1	0	1	0	0	0	0	0	0	0	0	0
40	MF	(Norway) NOR	Eirik Granaas	8	0	5	0	2	0	1	0	0	0	0	0
77	GK	(Norway) NOR	Martin Børsheim	17	0	12	0	0	0	2	0	2	0	1	0
90	GK	(Denmark) DEN	Valdemar Birksø	1	0	1	0	0	0	0	0	0	0	0	0
