= Oskar Øhlenschlæger =

Danish footballer (born 2004)

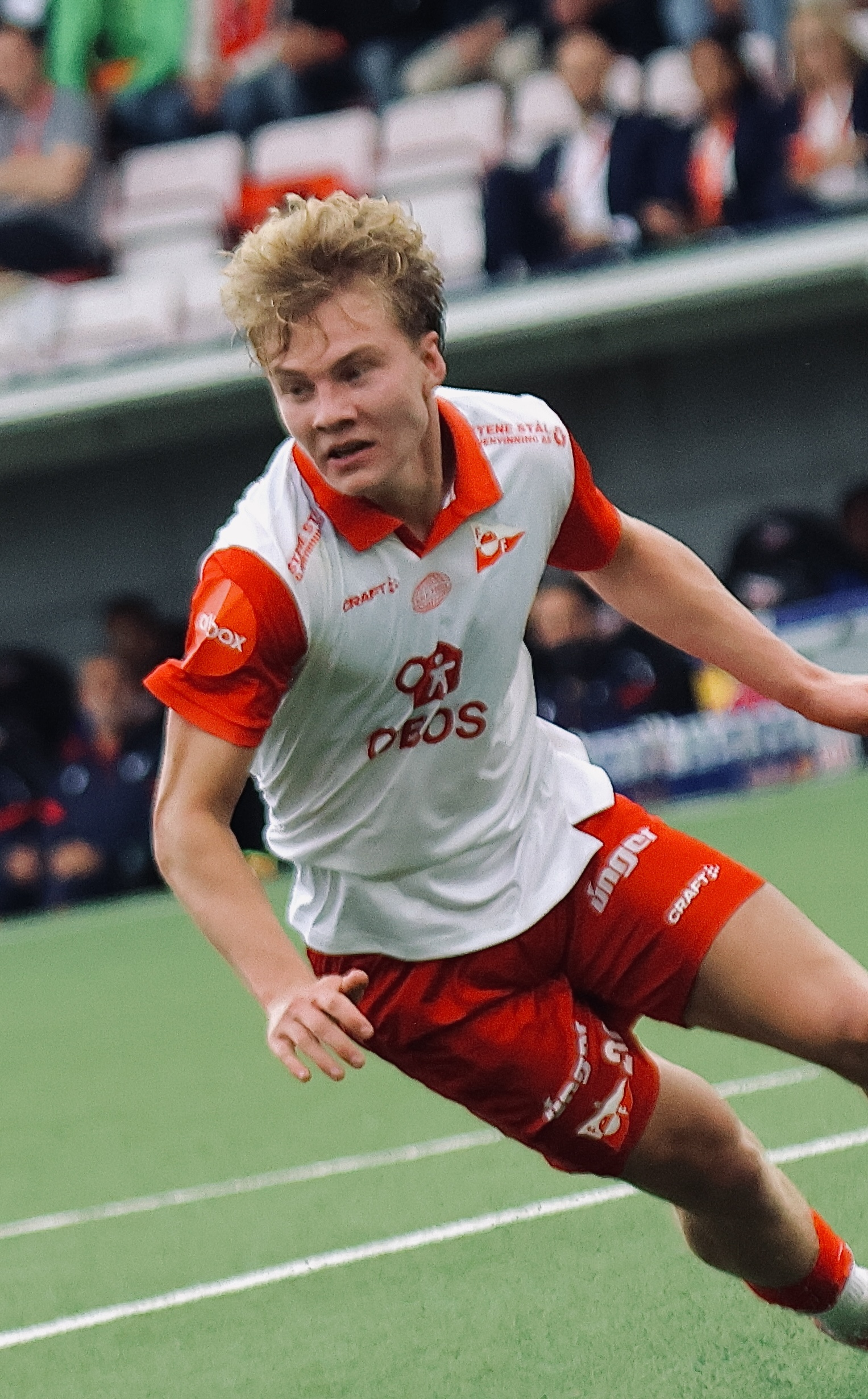
- Øhlenschlæger in 2025

Personal information
- Full name: Oskar Skovbjerg Øhlenschlæger
- Date of birth: 19 April 2004 (age 22)
- Place of birth: Aarhus, Denmark
- Height: 1.84 m (6 ft 0 in)
- Position: Central midfielder

Team information
- Current team: Samsunspor
- Number: 19

Youth career
- AGF
- –2012: Fulham
- 2012–2019: AFC Wimbledon
- 2019–2023: Nordsjælland

Senior career*
Years	Team	Apps	(Gls)
2023–2025	Vendsyssel	52	(6)
2025–2026	Fredrikstad	44	(9)
2026–	Samsunspor	0	(0)

International career^{‡}
2024–2025	Denmark U20	2	(0)
- * Club domestic league appearances and goals as of 25 August 2026 ‡ National team caps and goals as of 4 June 2026

Oskar Skovbjerg Øhlenschlæger (born 19 April 2004) is a Danish professional footballer who plays as a midfielder for Süper Lig club Samsunspor.

== Career ==
Øhlenschlæger was a youth player for Farum BK, progressing to FC Nordsjælland's U17 team in 2019 and then the U19 team in 2021. In 2023 he started his senior career for Vendsyssel FF in the Danish 1st Division. He made his international debut for Denmark in November 2024, representing Denmark U20 against South Korea U20. His second cap followed in June 2025 against the Republic of the Congo U20.

In January 2025 Øhlenschlæger signed for Norwegian side Fredrikstad FK on a four-year contract, for a reported fee of around 3 million kr. Including future add-on fees, Nordjyske described it as possibly being Vendsyssel's largest sale of all time.

His first appearance for the club came in March 2025 against SK Brann.

In the summer of 2025 and winter of 2026 he was "followed" by Danish clubs including AGF Aarhus and Brøndby IF.

== Personal life ==
Oskar was born in Aarhus in central Denmark. Øhlenschlæger great-great-grandfather was Danish poet and lyricist Adam Oehlenschläger who wrote the lyrics for the Danish national anthem Der er et yndigt land.

== Career statistics ==
As of 25 August 2026

Appearances and goals by club, season and competition
Club	Season	League			National Cup (Note: Includes Danish Cup, Norwegian Cup)		Europe		Total	
Club	Season	Division	Apps	Goals	Apps	Goals	Apps	Goals	Apps	Goals
Vendsyssel	2023–24	Danish 1st Division	31	4	0	0	—		31	4
Vendsyssel	2024–25	Danish 1st Division	17	2	2	0	—		19	2
Vendsyssel	Total		48	6	2	0	—		50	6
Fredrikstad	2025	Eliteserien	28	6	3	1	4 (Note: Two appearances in UEFA Europa League, two appearances in UEFA Conference League)	0	35	7
Fredrikstad	2026	Eliteserien	16	3	2	0	—		18	3
Fredrikstad	Total		44	9	5	1	4	0	53	10
Samsunspor	2026–27	Süper Lig	0	0	0	0	—		0	0
Career total			92	15	7	1	4	0	103	16
