= Eirik Granaas =

Norwegian footballer (born 2010)

Personal information
- Full name: Eirik Julius Granaas
- Date of birth: 24 March 2010 (age 16)
- Place of birth: Drammen, Norway
- Height: 1.78 m (5 ft 10 in)
- Position: Midfielder

Team information
- Current team: FC Porto
- Number: 70

Youth career
- –2022: Stoppen
- 2022–2025: Mjøndalen

Senior career*
Years	Team	Apps	(Gls)
2025–2026	Fredrikstad	10	(1)
2026–	FC Porto	0	(0)

International career
2025	Norway U15	2	(1)
2026–	Norway U16	3	(1)
- * Club domestic league appearances and goals as of 25 April 2026

Eirik Julius Granaas (born 24 March 2010) is a Norwegian professional footballer who plays as a midfielder for FC Porto.

== Club career ==
Eirik Granaas is the son of former professional footballer Lars Granaas, and his older brother Sondre Granaas also plays as a first tier footballer in Norway.

Granaas is a youth product of Stoppen SK and Mjøndalen IF, but joined Fredrikstad in Eliteserien in January 2025. He signed his first professional contract with the club the following March.

He made his professional debut with Fredrikstad in a 4–0 Norwegian Football Cup win over Sarpsborg FK on 12 April 2025. He came on for Patrick Metcalfe at the 59th minute.

Granaas made his Eliteserien on 22 June 2025, replacing Rocco Robert Shein in the last minutes of a 3–0 loss to Viking FK. At 15 years and 90 days, this made him the youngest player to ever play in the Norwegian top flight, breaking Martin Ødegaard's previous record. Later that year, on 14 August, he featured as a substitute in a 2–0 away defeat against FC Midtjylland in the Europa League third qualifying round, becoming the youngest player in European club competition since at least 1971. He scored his first senior goal in a 3–2 away win over Aalesund on 7 April 2026.
