= Aksel Baran Potur =

Turkish footballer (born 2002)

Aksel Potur
Personal information
- Full name: Aksel Baran Potur
- Date of birth: 12 May 2002 (age 24)
- Place of birth: Bærum, Norway
- Height: 1.85 m (6 ft 1 in)
- Position: Midfielder

Team information
- Current team: HamKam
- Number: 17

Youth career
- –2014: Abildsø
- 2015–2016: Skeid
- 2017–2018: Lillestrøm
- 2019–2021: KFUM

Senior career*
Years	Team	Apps	(Gls)
2019–2021	KFUM Oslo 2	5	(0)
2021	KFUM	2	(0)
2021	→ Moss (loan)	7	(0)
2021	→ Moss 2 (loan)	5	(2)
2022–2024	Moss	69	(2)
2022–2024	Moss 2	5	(2)
2025–	Hamkam	43	(4)
2025	HamKam 2	9	(2)

International career^{‡}
2023–2024	Turkey U21	8	(0)
- * Club domestic league appearances and goals as of 31 August 2026 ‡ National team caps and goals as of 13 April 2026

Aksel Baran Potur (born 12 May 2002) is a footballer who plays as a midfielder for Hamkam. Born in Norway, he represents Turkey internationally.

== Career ==
He was born in Bærum and grew up at Abildsø as a son of two parents of Turkish ethnicity. His grandparents emigrated to Norway. He played youth football for Abildsø, Skeid, Lillestrøm and KFUM—making his senior debut for the latter club in 2021. In the same season, however, he was loaned out to Moss FK. Being left-footed, Potur could be used "in all positions on the left side". Ahead of the 2022 season, the move was made permanent.

In 2023 he was scouted and eventually selected for Turkey U21. Alongside players such as Kenan Yildiz he played 7 matches in 2023 and 1 in 2024.

His performances for Moss and representation of Turkey made him an interesting player, especially for Turkish clubs. His agent was Dan Eggen. In August 2023 he rejected an offer from Caykur Rizespor, in January 2024 Moss rejected a bid from Sivasspor and later in 2024 he turned down an inquiry from Alanyaspor. FK Haugesund also tried to buy the player. At the end of 2024, Potur approached the end of his contract with Moss and moved to Eliteserien club Hamkam for free. He made his first-tier debut in March 2025 against Kristiansund. In 2025, his old Moss manager Thomas Myhre was appointed Hamkam manager.

== Career statistics ==
As of 31 August 2026

Appearances and goals by club, season and competition
Club	Season	League			National Cup		Other		Total	
Club	Season	Division	Apps	Goals	Apps	Goals	Apps	Goals	Apps	Goals
KFUM Oslo 2	2019	Norwegian Fourth Division	3	0	—		—		3	0
KFUM Oslo 2	2021	Norwegian Fourth Division	2	0	—		—		2	0
KFUM Oslo 2	Total		5	0	—		—		5	0
KFUM Oslo	2021	Norwegian First Division	2	0	1	0	—		3	0
Moss (loan)	2021	Norwegian Second Division	7	0	1	0	—		8	0
Moss 2 (loan)	2021	Norwegian Fourth Division	5	2	—		—		5	2
Moss	2022	Norwegian Second Division	21	1	3	1	—		24	2
Moss	2023	Norwegian First Division	28	1	3	0	—		31	1
Moss	2024	Norwegian First Division	20	0	1	0	2 (Note: Appearances in Norwegian First Division promotion play-offs)	0	23	0
Moss	Total		69	2	7	1	2	0	78	3
Moss 2	2022	Norwegian Fourth Division	4	2	—		—		4	2
Moss 2	2024	Norwegian Fourth Division	1	0	—		—		1	0
Moss 2	Total		5	2	—		—		5	2
HamKam	2025	Eliteserien	25	0	4	0	—		29	0
HamKam	2026	Eliteserien	18	4	1	0	—		19	4
HamKam	Total		43	4	5	0	—		48	4
HamKam 2	2025	Norwegian Third Division	9	2	—		—		9	2
Career total			145	12	14	1	2	0	161	13

== Honours ==
Individual

- Norwegian First Division Young Player of the Month: July 2023
