= Rocco Robert Shein =

Estonian footballer (born 2003)

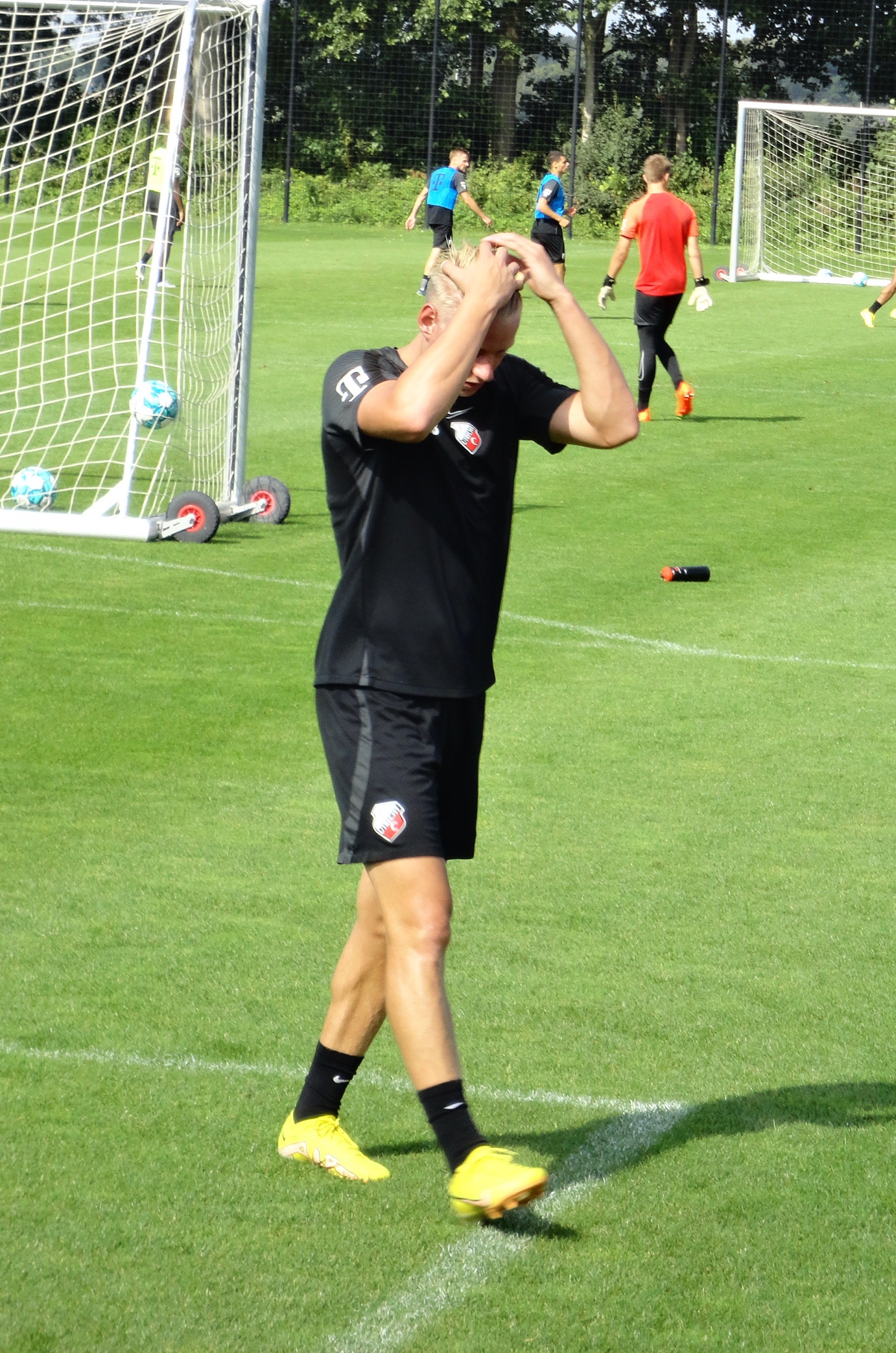
- FC Utrecht, 2022

Personal information
- Date of birth: 14 July 2003 (age 23)
- Place of birth: Tallinn, Estonia
- Height: 1.85 m (6 ft 1 in)
- Position: Midfielder

Team information
- Current team: Portsmouth
- Number: 19

Youth career
- 2010–2016: Tallinna Kalev
- 2017–2020: Flora

Senior career*
Years	Team	Apps	(Gls)
2018–2019	Flora U19	12	(5)
2018–2021	Flora U21	59	(8)
2020–2022	Flora	12	(0)
2022	→ Jong FC Utrecht (loan)	10	(1)
2022	→ FC Utrecht (loan)	1	(0)
2022–2023	Jong FC Utrecht	22	(0)
2022–2023	FC Utrecht	5	(0)
2023–2025	FC Dordrecht	43	(6)
2025–2026	Fredrikstad	39	(3)
2026–	Portsmouth	7	(0)

International career^{‡}
2018	Estonia U16	4	(0)
2019	Estonia U17	13	(0)
2021–2022	Estonia U21	9	(0)
2022–	Estonia	27	(1)
- * Club domestic league appearances and goals as of 13 July 2026 ‡ National team caps and goals as of 16 November 2026

Rocco Robert Shein (born 14 July 2003) is an Estonian professional footballer who plays as midfielder for EFL Championship club Portsmouth and the Estonia national team.

== Club career ==
=== Flora ===
A product of Flora youth academy, Shein made his professional debut on 22 November 2020 in a Meistriliiga match against Nõmme Kalju, coming on as a substitute in the 75th minute for Markus Poom in a 3–0 away victory. On 10 August 2021, he made his UEFA Europa League debut as a substitute in extra-time against Omonia, which ended in a loss on aggregate after a penalty shootout.

=== FC Utrecht ===
On 31 January 2022, Shein moved to Eerste Divisie club Jong FC Utrecht on loan, with an option to sign a permanent contract until 2025 at the end of the spell. He made his competitive debut for the club on 4 February, coming on as a late substitute in a 2–0 loss to FC Volendam. In the following match, on 7 February, Shein managed to score his first goal in a 3–2 victory against Helmond Sport.

Shein made his FC Utrecht first-team debut in the Eredivisie on 29 April, starting in midfield in a 1–0 home victory against NEC.

On 27 May 2022, Utrecht exercised their option to buy Shein's rights, he signed a three-year contract with the club and was transferred to the senior squad.

=== FC Dordrecht ===
On 26 July 2023, Shein signed a three-year contract with Eerste Divisie club FC Dordrecht for a fee of €250 000. He became the first player in 30 years that Dordrecht paid a transfer fee to another club for.

=== Fredrikstad ===
On 27 January 2025, Shein joined Fredrikstad in Norway on a four-year deal.

=== Portsmouth ===
On 13 July 2026, Shein joined EFL Championship club Portsmouth.

== International career ==
Shein made his debut for the Estonia national football team on 13 June 2022 in a friendly against Albania.

== Career statistics ==
=== Club ===
As of match played 16 July 2026.

Appearances and goals by club, season and competition
Club	Season	League			National cup (Note: Includes Estonian Cup, KNVB Cup, Norwegian Cup)		Europe		Other		Total	
Club	Season	Division	Apps	Goals	Apps	Goals	Apps	Goals	Apps	Goals	Apps	Goals
Flora U19	2018	Esiliiga B	6	0	0	0	—		—		6	0
Flora U19	2019	II liiga	6	5	0	0	—		—		6	5
Flora U19	Total		12	5	0	0	—		—		12	5
Flora U21	2018	Esiliiga	5	0	0	0	—		—		5	0
Flora U21	2019	Esiliiga	17	1	2	0	—		—		19	1
Flora U21	2020	Esiliiga	26	6	1	0	—		—		27	6
Flora U21	2021	Esiliiga	11	1	0	0	—		—		11	1
Flora U21	Total		59	8	3	0	—		—		62	8
Flora	2020	Meistriliiga	1	0	0	0	0	0	0	0	1	0
Flora	2021	Meistriliiga	11	0	2	0	4 (Note: One appearance in UEFA Europa League, three appearances in UEFA Europa Conference League)	0	1 (Note: Appearance in Estonian Supercup)	0	18	0
Flora	Total		12	0	2	0	4	0	1	0	19	0
Jong FC Utrecht (loan)	2021–22	Eerste Divisie	10	1	—		—		—		10	1
Jong FC Utrecht	2022–23	Eerste Divisie	22	0	—		—		—		22	0
Jong FC Utrecht	Total		32	1	—		—		—		32	1
FC Utrecht (loan)	2021–22	Eredivisie	1	0	0	0	—		1 (Note: Appearance in Eredivisie European play-offs)	0	2	0
FC Utrecht	2022–23	Eredivisie	5	0	1	0	—		0	0	6	0
FC Utrecht	Total		6	0	1	0	—		1	0	8	0
FC Dordrecht	2023–24	Eerste Divisie	25	3	1	0	—		1 (Note: Appearance in Eerste Divisie play-offs)	0	27	3
FC Dordrecht	2024–25	Eerste Divisie	18	3	1	0	—		0	0	19	3
FC Dordrecht	Total		43	6	2	0	—		1	0	46	6
Fredrikstad	2025	Eliteserien	28	1	4	1	4 (Note: Two appearances in UEFA Europa League, two appearances in UEFA Conference League)	0	—		36	2
Fredrikstad	2026	Eliteserien	11	2	2	0	—		—		13	2
Fredrikstad	Total		39	3	6	1	4	0	—		49	4
Career total			203	23	14	1	8	0	3	0	228	24

=== International ===
As of match played 16 November 2026

Appearances and goals by national team and year
National team	Year	Apps	Goals
Estonia	2022	3	0
Estonia	2023	5	0
Estonia	2024	8	1
Estonia	2025	8	0
Estonia	2026	3	0
Total		27	1

Scores and results list Estonia's goal tally first, score column indicates score after each Shein goal.

List of international goals scored by Rocco Robert Shein
No.	Date	Venue	Cap	Opponent	Score	Result	Competition
1	11 October 2024	A. Le Coq Arena, Tallinn, Estonia	14	Azerbaijan	3–1	3–1	2024–25 UEFA Nations League C

== Honours ==
Flora

- Meistriliiga: 2020
- Estonian Supercup: 2021

Estonia

- Baltic Cup: 2024, 2026
