= 2026 Fredrikstad FK season =

Fredrikstad
2026 season
- Chairman: Jostein Lunde
- Head coach: Andreas Hagen (until 18 May); Kevin Nicol (from 19 May)
- Stadium: Fredrikstad Stadion
- Eliteserien: 10th
- 2025–26 Norwegian Cup: Quarter-finals
- 2026–27 Norwegian Cup: Pre-season
Home colours	Away colours	Third colours

The 2026 season is the 123rd season in the history of Fredrikstad Fotballklubb and the third consecutive season in the Eliteserien. In addition, Fredrikstad will participate in the 2026–27 Norwegian Football Cup. The team completed its participation in the 2025–26 Norwegian Football Cup, where it was eliminated in the quarter-finals.

== Transfers ==
=== In ===
Pos.	Player	Transferred from	Fee	Date	Source
MF	(Sweden) Samuel Leach Holm	(Sweden) BK Häcken		6 January 2026	
DF	(Norway) Fredrik Holmé	(Norway) Kongsvinger		23 January 2026	
MF	(Sweden) Max Nilsson	(Sweden) Landskrona BoIS		6 February 2026	
MF	(Ghana) Leonard Owusu	(Serbia) FK Partizan		11 March 2026	
FW	(United States) Gabriel Wesseh	(United States) Atlanta United		14 July 2026	

=== Out ===
Pos.	Player	Transferred to	Fee	Date	Source
FW	(Faroe Islands) Jóannes Bjartalíð	(Kazakhstan) FC Kyzylzhar	End of contract	31 December 2025	
MF	(Canada) Patrick Metcalfe	(Norway) Hamarkameratene		31 December 2025	
MF	(Norway) Elias Solberg	(Norway) Ranheim	Undisclosed	16 March 2026	

== Pre-season and friendlies ==
31 January 2026 Friendly	Lillestrøm (Norway)	2–2	(Norway) Fredrikstad

4 February 2026 Friendly	Fredrikstad (Norway)	3–2	(Norway) Jerv

7 February 2026 Friendly	IF Elfsborg (Sweden)	0–2	(Norway) Fredrikstad

17 February 2026 Friendly	Fredrikstad (Norway)	1–1	(Norway) KFUM Oslo

22 February 2026 Friendly	Aalesund (Norway)	2–3	(Norway) Fredrikstad

28 February 2026 Friendly	Fredrikstad (Norway)	4–1	(Norway) Odd

20 June 2026 Friendly	Fredrikstad (Norway)	1–1	(Norway) HamKam	Fredrikstad
14:00	55'		15'	Stadium: Fredrikstad Stadion

28 June 2026 Friendly	Fredrikstad (Norway)	0–0	(Sweden) IF Elfsborg	Fredrikstad
14:00				Stadium: Fredrikstad Stadion

4 July 2026 Friendly	Vålerenga (Norway)	3–1	(Norway) Fredrikstad	Oslo
14:00	9'; 14'; 32'		29'; (penalty missed) , 45+1	Stadium: Intility Arena

== Competitions ==
=== Overall record ===
Competition	First match	Last match	Starting round	Final position	Record							
Competition	First match	Last match	Starting round	Final position	Pld	W	D	L	GF	GA	GD	Win %
Eliteserien	15 March 2026		Matchday 1		11	4	2	5	15	20	−5	36.36
2025–26 Norwegian Football Cup	8 March 2026	19 March 2026	Fourth round	Quarter-finals	2	1	0	1	4	4	+0	50.00
2026–27 Norwegian Football Cup					0	0	0	0	0	0	+0	—
Total					13	5	2	6	19	24	−5	38.46

Source: Competitions

=== Eliteserien ===
Pos	Team	Pld	W	D	L	GF	GA	GD	Pts
8	Sandefjord	11	4	2	5	10	13	−3	14
9	Vålerenga	11	4	2	5	13	17	−4	14
10	Fredrikstad	11	4	2	5	15	20	−5	14
11	Brann	12	4	1	7	24	20	+4	13
12	KFUM	11	3	3	5	12	17	−5	12

Updated to match(es) played on 30 May 2026. Source: Football Association of Norway (in Norwegian)
Rules for classification: 1) Points; 2) Goal difference; 3) Goals scored; 4) Head-to-head points; 5) Head-to-head goal difference; 6) Head-to-head goals scored.

==== Results summary ====
Overall								Home						Away					
Pld	W	D	L	GF	GA	GD	Pts	W	D	L	GF	GA	GD	W	D	L	GF	GA	GD
11	4	2	5	15	20	−5	14	3	1	1	9	6	+3	1	1	4	6	14	−8

==== Results by round ====
Round	1	2	3	4	5	6	7	8	9	10	11
Ground	A	H	A	H	A	H	A	A	H	A	H
Result	L	W	W	D	L	L	L	L	W	D	W
Position											

Updated to match(es) played on May 2026. Source:
A = Away; H = Home; W = Win; D = Draw; L = Loss

==== Matches ====
The match schedule was issued on 19 December 2025.

15 March 2026 1	Tromsø	4–0	Fredrikstad

22 March 2026 2	Fredrikstad	3–1	KFUM Oslo

7 April 2026 3	Aalesund	2–3	Fredrikstad

12 April 2026 4	Fredrikstad	1–1	Vålerenga

19 April 2026 5	Kristiansund	2–0	Fredrikstad

25 April 2026 6	Fredrikstad	1–2	Viking

2 May 2026 7	Brann	3–1	Fredrikstad

9 May 2026 8	Sarpsborg 08	2–1	Fredrikstad

16 May 2026 9	Fredrikstad	2–1	HamKam

25 May 2026 10	Sandefjord	1–1	Fredrikstad

29 May 2026 11	Fredrikstad	2–1	Start	Fredrikstad
19:00				Stadium: Fredrikstad Stadion; Referee: Kristoffer Hagenes

=== Norwegian Football Cup ===
==== 2025–26 ====
8 March 2026 Fourth round	Fredrikstad	2–1	Sarpsborg 08

19 March 2026 Quarter-finals	KFUM Oslo	3–2	Fredrikstad

==== 2026–27 ====
22–23 August 2026 First round	Eidsvold IF	v	Fredrikstad
