= 2023 Norwegian First Division =

Association football season in Norway

Norwegian First Division
- Season: 2023
- Dates: 10 April – 12 November
- Champions: Fredrikstad
- Promoted: Fredrikstad; KFUM Oslo; Kristiansund
- Relegated: Hødd; Jerv; Skeid
- Matches: 240
- Goals: 667 (2.78 per match)
- Top goalscorer: Benjamin Stokke (16 goals)
- Highest attendance: 7,479; Fredrikstad - Moss (16 May 2023)
- Lowest attendance: 415; Åsane - Skeid (9 July 2023)
- Average attendance: 1,851

The 2023 Norwegian First Division (referred to as OBOS-ligaen for sponsorship reasons) is a Norwegian second-tier football league season.

The season started on 10 April 2023 and ended on 12 November 2023, not including play-off matches.

== Teams ==
Locations of the teams in the 2023 Norwegian First Division

In the 2022 Norwegian First Division, Brann and Stabæk were promoted to the 2023 Eliteserien, while Grorud and Stjørdals-Blink were relegated to the 2023 Norwegian Second Division.

Jerv and Kristiansund were relegated from the 2022 Eliteserien, while Moss and Hødd were promoted from the 2022 Norwegian Second Division.

=== Stadiums and locations ===
Team	Location	Arena	Capacity
Bryne	Bryne	Bryne Stadion	4,000
Fredrikstad	Fredrikstad	Fredrikstad Stadion	12,500
Hødd	Ulsteinvik	Nye Høddvoll	4,081
Jerv	Grimstad	Levermyr Stadion	3,300
KFUM Oslo	Oslo	KFUM-Arena	2,000
Kongsvinger	Kongsvinger	Gjemselund Stadion	5,824
Kristiansund	Kristiansund	Kristiansund Stadion	4,444
Mjøndalen	Mjøndalen	Consto Arena	4,200
Moss	Moss	Melløs Stadion	4,000
Ranheim	Trondheim	EXTRA Arena	3,000
Raufoss	Raufoss	NAMMO Stadion	1,800
Sandnes Ulf	Sandnes	Øster Hus Arena	6,043
Skeid	Oslo	Nordre Åsen Kunstgressbane	2,500
Sogndal	Sogndalsfjøra	Fosshaugane Campus	5,622
Start	Kristiansand	Sparebanken Sør Arena	14,448
Åsane	Bergen	Åsane Arena	3,300

== League table ==
Pos	Team	Pld	W	D	L	GF	GA	GD	Pts	Promotion, qualification or relegation
1	Fredrikstad (C, P)	30	18	10	2	50	23	+27	64	Promotion to Eliteserien
2	KFUM Oslo (P)	30	17	7	6	51	31	+20	58	Promotion to Eliteserien
3	Kongsvinger	30	16	4	10	53	39	+14	52	Qualification for the promotion play-offs
4	Kristiansund (O, P)	30	14	8	8	56	38	+18	50	Qualification for the promotion play-offs
5	Start	30	12	10	8	49	36	+13	46	Qualification for the promotion play-offs
6	Bryne	30	13	5	12	40	36	+4	44	Qualification for the promotion play-offs
7	Sogndal	30	12	7	11	45	45	0	43	
8	Ranheim	30	12	4	14	36	53	−17	40	
9	Raufoss	30	10	8	12	35	36	−1	38	
10	Moss	30	10	8	12	37	40	−3	38	
11	Sandnes Ulf	30	10	7	13	42	45	−3	37	
12	Åsane	30	9	10	11	41	44	−3	37	
13	Mjøndalen	30	10	7	13	39	42	−3	37	
14	Hødd (R)	30	8	9	13	29	38	−9	33	Qualification for the relegation play-offs
15	Jerv (R)	30	8	7	15	40	59	−19	31	Relegation to Second Division
16	Skeid (R)	30	3	5	22	24	62	−38	14	Relegation to Second Division

Source: Norwegian Football Federation (in Norwegian)
Rules for classification: 1) Points; 2) Goal difference; 3) Goals scored; 4) Head-to-head points; 5) Head-to-head goal difference; 6) Head-to-head goals scored.
(C) Champions; (O) Play-off winners; (P) Promoted; (R) Relegated

== Positions by round ==
Team ╲ Round	1	2	3	4	5	6	7	8	9	10	11	12	13	14	15	16	17	18	19	20	21	22	23	24	25	26	27	28	29	30
Fredrikstad	4	3	3	4	3	4	5	3	4	1	4	2	2	2	2	1	1	2	1	1	1	1	1	1	1	1	1	1	1	1
KFUM Oslo	6	15	16	15	16	16	12	14	11	9	7	6	3	5	5	4	3	3	3	3	4	3	2	2	2	2	2	2	2	2
Kongsvinger	12	8	10	14	11	8	10	7	5	3	1	1	1	1	1	2	2	1	2	2	2	2	3	3	3	3	3	3	3	3
Kristiansund	14	16	11	7	4	2	3	2	1	2	5	3	4	3	4	5	5	4	4	5	3	4	5	5	5	5	4	4	4	4
Start	8	2	5	8	7	5	4	5	6	4	6	8	6	7	6	6	6	5	6	4	5	5	4	4	4	4	5	5	5	5
Bryne	2	9	9	10	8	12	9	9	12	13	14	14	14	11	13	12	12	11	12	12	10	8	9	9	7	8	8	8	7	6
Sogndal	6	3	2	3	6	3	1	1	2	5	2	4	5	4	3	3	4	6	5	6	6	6	6	6	6	6	6	6	6	7
Ranheim	2	1	1	1	1	1	2	4	3	6	3	5	7	8	9	10	10	9	8	7	8	7	7	8	11	7	7	7	8	8
Raufoss	14	6	7	5	5	9	8	10	13	14	13	13	13	14	12	11	11	10	9	8	9	10	8	7	10	10	9	10	9	9
Moss	8	11	12	11	9	7	7	6	7	7	8	9	10	9	7	7	8	8	7	10	11	11	11	11	9	11	11	12	12	10
Sandnes Ulf	1	7	8	9	12	13	13	13	10	8	11	12	12	12	11	13	13	12	11	9	7	9	10	10	8	9	10	11	10	11
Åsane	8	12	12	13	14	15	16	16	16	16	16	16	16	15	15	15	15	15	15	15	15	14	12	12	12	12	13	13	13	12
Mjøndalen	8	13	14	16	15	14	15	12	9	12	10	10	9	10	10	9	9	13	13	13	13	15	13	14	13	13	12	9	11	13
Hødd	4	3	6	2	2	6	6	8	8	11	12	11	11	13	14	14	14	14	14	14	14	13	15	15	15	15	15	15	14	14
Jerv	12	9	4	6	10	11	11	11	14	10	9	7	8	6	8	8	7	7	10	11	12	12	14	13	14	14	14	14	15	15
Skeid	16	14	15	12	13	10	14	15	15	15	15	15	15	16	16	16	16	16	16	16	16	16	16	16	16	16	16	16	16	16

Promotion to 2024 Eliteserien
Promotion play-offs
Relegation play-offs
Relegation to 2024 2. divisjon

Source: nifs.no

== Results ==
Home \ Away	BRY	FRE	HØD	JER	KFU	KON	KRI	MJØ	MOS	RAN	RAU	ULF	SKE	SOG	STA	ÅSA
Bryne	—	0–0	2–1	0–0	0–1	2–1	1–1	2–1	3–1	1–0	4–1	3–0	1–0	2–1	2–2	1–2
Fredrikstad	2–1	—	1–0	1–0	1–0	1–1	4–1	1–2	1–1	4–0	3–0	0–0	0–0	2–1	3–1	2–1
Hødd	0–1	1–1	—	2–2	0–1	2–1	0–1	1–2	1–1	0–0	1–0	1–1	2–0	2–2	2–1	1–1
Jerv	1–3	1–1	2–1	—	4–3	0–2	1–1	2–3	1–1	1–2	1–0	0–2	3–2	1–3	0–1	0–0
KFUM Oslo	1–0	2–1	0–1	6–2	—	2–0	2–0	1–0	4–2	0–1	0–0	3–1	1–0	1–1	2–2	2–1
Kongsvinger	1–3	1–2	0–3	2–1	1–1	—	1–1	2–0	1–2	3–0	1–3	4–0	5–0	1–0	2–1	3–1
Kristiansund	3–1	0–1	4–0	3–1	0–2	2–0	—	0–0	4–1	3–2	1–2	0–1	2–2	2–1	1–1	4–1
Mjøndalen	3–1	0–1	3–0	2–2	2–2	2–3	1–3	—	1–2	1–2	3–0	1–3	2–0	0–0	2–0	0–0
Moss	2–1	2–2	3–0	2–1	0–1	0–1	0–3	4–1	—	0–1	1–0	1–0	3–0	1–2	0–0	1–0
Ranheim	2–1	1–2	0–0	4–2	4–2	1–4	0–2	2–3	2–1	—	1–3	0–5	0–4	2–0	0–0	3–2
Raufoss	0–1	1–1	0–1	2–3	4–0	1–2	3–2	0–0	1–1	0–0	—	1–1	1–0	3–0	2–1	0–0
Sandnes Ulf	2–0	2–3	1–3	2–3	1–2	1–2	1–1	1–0	2–0	3–2	0–0	—	4–1	1–2	1–0	3–3
Skeid	2–0	1–2	1–1	0–1	0–4	1–2	0–5	0–2	2–2	0–1	1–2	3–0	—	2–4	1–4	1–3
Sogndal	2–2	0–1	1–0	5–1	0–3	3–3	2–4	1–1	2–1	1–2	2–1	1–0	2–0	—	2–1	1–1
Start	2–0	2–2	4–2	2–1	1–1	2–1	4–0	3–0	0–0	2–1	1–3	3–3	3–0	2–0	—	1–0
Åsane	2–1	0–4	1–0	1–2	1–1	1–2	2–2	3–2	2–1	3–0	3–1	2–0	0–0	2–3	2–2	—

Source: Norwegian Football Federation (in Norwegian)
Legend: Blue = home team win; Yellow = draw; Red = away team win.

== Play-offs ==
=== Promotion play-offs ===
The teams from third to sixth place will take part in the promotion play-offs; these are single leg knockout matches. In the first round, the fifth-placed team will play at home against the sixth-placed team. The winner of the first round will meet the fourth-placed team on away ground in the second round. The winner of the second round will meet the third-placed team on away ground. The winner of the third round will face the 14th-placed team in the Eliteserien over two legs in the Eliteserien play-offs for a spot in the top-flight next season.

First round
5	Start	0
6	Bryne (w/o)	3

Second round
4	Kristiansund	1 (4)
6	Bryne	1 (2)

Third round
3	Kongsvinger	2
4	Kristiansund	4

First round

25 November 2023
19:00 CET

Start	0–3 (w/o)	Bryne
	Report

Sør Arena, Kristiansand
Referee: Marius Hansen Grøtta

Second round

29 November 2023
19:00 CET

Kristiansund	1–1 (a.e.t.)	Bryne
Rakneberg 48'	Report	Moreira 78'
Penalties
Willumsson (penalty scored); Isaksen (penalty scored); Broholm (penalty scored); Ulvestad (penalty scored)	4–2	(penalty scored) Dybevik; (penalty missed) Baldvinsson; (penalty missed) Moreira; (penalty scored) Saunes

Kristiansund Stadion, Kristiansund
Attendance: 3,571
Referee: Marius Lien

Third round

3 December 2023
14:00 CET

Kongsvinger	2–4	Kristiansund
Hellan 48'; Andersen 85'	Report	Sivertsen 7'; Stokke 54'; Broholm 72', 84'

Gjemselund Stadion, Kongsvinger
Attendance: 1,216
Referee: Mohammad Usman Aslam

=== Relegation play-offs ===
The 14th-placed team will take part in a two-legged play-off against the winners of the Second Division play-offs, to decide who will play in the First Division next season.

Semifinal
2	Lyn	1	2	3
3	Tromsdalen	2	0	2

Final
1	Hødd	0	1	1
Lyn	3	2	5

27 November 2023
18:00 CET

Lyn	3–0	Hødd
Olsen 17'; Kristiansen 46'; Breistøl 60'	Report

Nadderud Stadion, Bærum
Attendance: 2,500
Referee: Eivind Bodding
2 December 2023
15:00 CET

Hødd	1–2	Lyn
Skeide 38'	Report	Breistøl 9'; Elvevold 88'

Color Line Stadion, Ålesund
Attendance: 628
Referee: Steinar Hauge

== Season statistics ==
=== Top scorers ===
As of 12 November 2023

Rank	Player	Club	Goals
1	(Norway) Benjamin Stokke	Kristiansund	16
2	(Portugal) Samuel Pedro	Jerv	14
3	(Norway) Tommy Høiland	Sandnes Ulf	12
4	(Faroe Islands) Jóannes Bjartalíð	Fredrikstad	11
4	(Norway) Joacim Holtan	Kongsvinger	11
4	(Turkey) Adem Güven	Kongsvinger	11
7	(Norway) Kristian Lien	Mjøndalen	10
7	(Portugal) Cláudio Braga	Moss	10
7	(Norway) Johannes Nuñez	KFUM Oslo	10
7	(Senegal) Mame Mor Ndiaye	Åsane	10

== Awards ==
=== Monthly awards ===
Month	Coach of the Month		Player of the Month		Young Player of the Month		References
Month	Coach	Club	Player	Club	Player	Club	References
April	(Norway) Joakim Dragsten	Hødd	(Denmark) Mads Nielsen	Fredrikstad	(Sweden) Tom Strannegård	Start	
May	(Norway) Vegard Hansen	Kongsvinger	(Norway) Henrik Skogvold	Start	(Norway) Kristian Lien	Mjøndalen	
June	(Norway) Johannes Moesgaard	KFUM	(Norway) Robin Rasch	KFUM	(Norway) Fredrik Holmé	Kongsvinger	
July	(Norway) Tore André Flo	Sogndal	(Iceland) Valdimar Þór Ingimundarson	Sogndal	(Norway) Aksel Baran Potur	Moss	
August	(Faroe Islands) Mikkjal Thomassen	Fredrikstad	(Norway) Sondre Sørløkk	Fredrikstad	(Norway) Tobias Guddal	Bryne	
September	(Norway) Johannes Moesgaard	KFUM	(Norway) Akinsola Akinyemi	KFUM	(Norway) Håkon Sjåtil	Åsane	
October	(Norway) Amund Skiri	Kristiansund	(Faroe Islands) Jóannes Bjartalíð	Fredrikstad	(Norway) Oskar Sivertsen	Kristiansund	

=== Annual awards ===
Award	Winner	Club
Coach of the Season	(Norway) Johannes Moesgaard	KFUM
Player of the Season	(Faroe Islands) Jóannes Bjartalíð	Fredrikstad
Young Player of the Season	(Norway) Obilor Okeke	KFUM

== League attendances ==
Pos	Team	Total	High	Low	Average	Change
1	Fredrikstad	72,745	7,479	3,063	4,850	+26.3%
2	Start	67,243	7,276	3,273	4,483	+5.5%
3	Kristiansund	48,691	3,788	2,964	3,246	−14.4%^{1}
4	Sandnes Ulf	28,755	4,037	943	1,917	−3.9%
5	Kongsvinger	27,890	3,482	1,423	1,859	+37.6%
6	Sogndal	26,729	4,089	1,456	1,782	+4.6%
7	Moss	25,805	2,775	1,401	1,720	+106.7%^{2}
8	Jerv	24,023	2,625	1,228	1,602	−35.6%^{1}
9	Mjøndalen	18,738	2,765	967	1,249	+3.1%
10	Ranheim	18,006	1,692	813	1,200	+6.5%
11	Hødd	17,908	1,730	948	1,194	+11.4%^{2}
12	Bryne	17,852	1,835	930	1,190	+17.9%
13	KFUM Oslo	16,340	2,449	684	1,089	+12.0%
14	Raufoss	12,593	1,305	450	840	−4.5%
15	Skeid	10,964	147	432	731	−12.7%
16	Åsane	10,022	1,688	415	668	−27.5%
	League total	444,304	7,479	147	1,851	−12.7%

Updated to games played on 14 November 2023
Notes:
1: Team played last season in Eliteserien.
2: Team played last season in 2. divisjon.
