= Patrick Metcalfe =

Canadian soccer player (born 1998)

Personal information
- Date of birth: November 11, 1998 (age 27)
- Place of birth: Richmond, British Columbia, Canada
- Height: 1.83 m (6 ft 0 in)
- Position: Midfielder

Team information
- Current team: HamKam
- Number: 26

Youth career
- 2006–2013: Richmond FC
- 2013–2016: Fusion FC
- 2016–2017: Vancouver Whitecaps FC

Senior career*
Years	Team	Apps	(Gls)
2017	Whitecaps FC 2	4	(0)
2018	TSS FC Rovers	10	(0)
2020–2021	Vancouver Whitecaps FC	20	(0)
2022	Stabæk	23	(1)
2023–2025	Fredrikstad	86	(2)
2026–	HamKam	14	(1)

International career^{‡}
2021	Canada U23	4	(0)
- * Club domestic league appearances and goals as of August 20, 2026 ‡ National team caps and goals as of March 28, 2021

Patrick Metcalfe (born November 11, 1998) is a Canadian professional soccer player who plays for Norwegian side HamKam.

== Club career ==
=== Whitecaps FC 2 ===
Metcalfe signed his first professional contract with Whitecaps FC 2 of the United Soccer League on April 21, 2017. He made his debut on May 28, 2017, as a half-time substitute during a 1–2 loss to Real Monarchs. He spent one season with Whitecaps FC 2 before the club ceased operations after the 2017 season.

=== TSS FC Rovers ===
After one season with Whitecaps FC 2, Metcalfe signed with TSS FC Rovers of the Premier Development League for the 2018 season.

=== Whitecaps Development Team ===
In 2019, Metcalfe signed with Whitecaps Development Team and was called to pre-season with WFC First team to Honolulu and Los Angeles.

=== Vancouver Whitecaps FC ===
On January 23, 2020, Metcalfe joined Vancouver's first-team in MLS. At the conclusion of the 2021 Major League Soccer season, Metcalfe's contract option was declined by Vancouver.

=== Stabæk ===
In March 2022 Metcalfe signed with Norwegian club Stabæk on a three-year contract.

=== Fredrikstad ===
In March 2023, Metcalfe would transfer to 1. divisjon side Fredrikstad, signing a two-year contract. Metcalfe would help Fredrikstad win promotion to Eliteserien in the 2023 season, and the Norwegian Cup in the 2024 season. In December 2024, it was announced that Metcalfe's contract would not be renewed for the 2025 season. He would play 70 matches in his two seasons with the club.

On March 11, 2025, the club announced Metcalfe had signed on for the 2025 season.

== International career ==
Metcalfe is of Filipino descent, and as a result is eligible for both Canada and the Philippines.

=== Youth ===
Metcalfe was named to the Canadian U-23 provisional roster for the 2020 CONCACAF Men's Olympic Qualifying Championship on February 26, 2020. He was named to the final squad ahead of the rescheduled tournament on March 10, 2021.

== Career statistics ==
As of match played August 20, 2026

Appearances and goals by club, season and competition
Club	Season	League			National cup (Note: Includes Canadian Championship, Norwegian Cup)		Continental		Total	
Club	Season	Division	Apps	Goals	Apps	Goals	Apps	Goals	Apps	Goals
Whitecaps FC 2	2017	USL Championship	4	0	–		–		4	0
Vancouver Whitecaps FC	2020	MLS	7	0	0	0	–		7	0
Vancouver Whitecaps FC	2021	MLS	13	0	1	0	–		14	0
Vancouver Whitecaps FC	Total		20	0	1	0	–		21	0
Stabæk	2022	Norwegian First Division	23	1	2	0	–		25	1
Fredrikstad	2023	Norwegian First Division	30	1	3	0	–		33	1
Fredrikstad	2024	Eliteserien	30	0	7	0	–		37	0
Fredrikstad	2025	Eliteserien	26	1	5	0	4 (Note: Two appearances in UEFA Europa League, one appearance in UEFA Conference League)	0	35	1
Fredrikstad	Total		86	2	15	0	4	0	105	2
HamKam	2026	Eliteserien	14	1	0	0	0	0	14	1
Career total			147	4	18	0	4	0	169	4

== Honours ==
Fredrikstad

- Norwegian Cup: 2024
- Norwegian First Division: 2023
