= Johannes Moesgaard =

Norwegian football manager (born 1984)

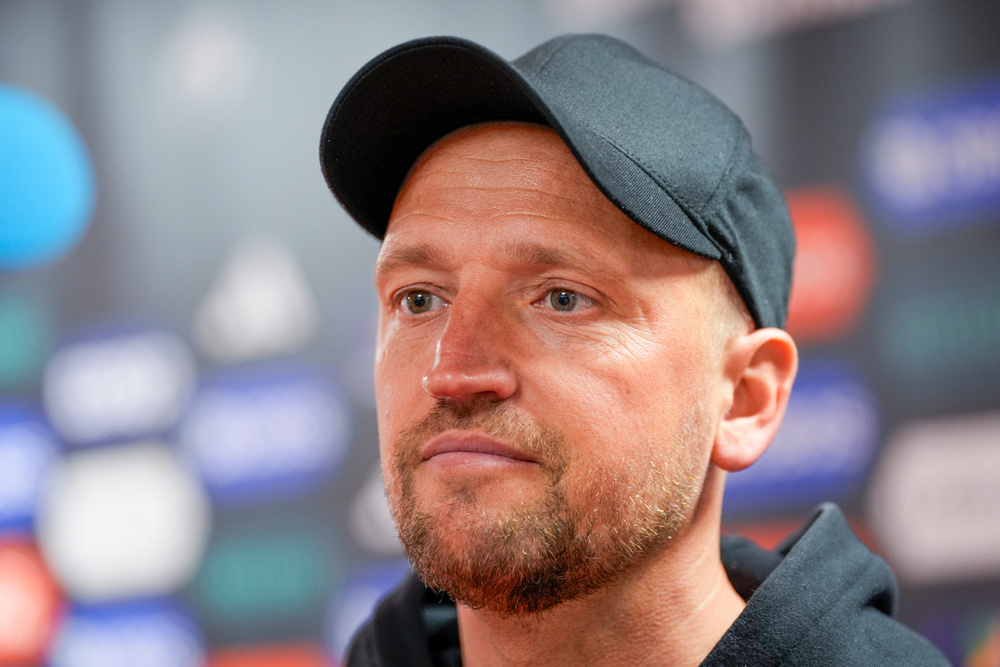
- Moesgaard in 2026

Personal information
- Full name: Johannes Moesgaard
- Date of birth: 1 March 1984 (age 42)
- Place of birth: Askim, Norway

Team information
- Current team: Vålerenga (head coach)

Managerial career
- Years: Team
- 2018–2020: Vålerenga (assistant)
- 2020–2022: KFUM Oslo (assistant)
- 2023–2026: KFUM Oslo
- 2026–: Vålerenga

Johannes Moesgaard (born 1 March 1984) is a Norwegian football manager. He is currently the head coach of Eliteserien club Vålerenga.

== Coaching career ==
=== Early career ===
The coaching career started on the sports programme at Askim Upper Secondary School. When Moesgaard realised he wouldn't reach the top as a player, he turned his gaze towards the coaching bench. His very first assignment was with Spydeberg girls' U16.

=== Vålerenga ===
In 2006, when Moesgaard was 22 years old, he started in a role as an elite player developer at Vålerenga's youth setup. Here he was an important figure for players like Sander Berge and Ghayas Zahid, who would go on to play for several different European teams. He would eventually rise through the ranks at the Oslo based club, and by 2015 Moesgaard was working with the club's first team, before he became the team's assistant coach under Ronny Deila in 2018.

Before the start of the 2020 season, Vålerenga hired Dag-Eilev Fagermo as their new head coach. Fagermo wanted to bring a new set of coaches with him, and as a consequence, Moesgaard was let go by the club.

=== KFUM Oslo ===
After leaving Vålerenga, Moesgaard joined Norwegian First Division side KFUM Oslo, where he was hired as the new assistant coach under Jørgen Isnes. Two years later, in October 2022, Moesgaard extended his contract with KFUM Oslo for an additional three years.

In December 2022, after Isnes had been recruited as manager by Strømsgodset, Moesgaard was promoted from his role as an assistant coach to become the new head coach. In his first season in charge, Moesgaard took KFUM Oslo to new heights, as the club finished second in the standings and were promoted to the top flight for the first time in their existence. As the season ended, he was awarded the Norwegian First Division Coach of the Year by Norsk Toppfotball and TV2.

In KFUM Oslo's first season in the Eliteserien, Moesgaard led the team to an impressive 8th place in the standings. This led him to once again being named the Coach of the Year, this time for the Eliteserien. Their subsequent season proved more challenging for KFUM Oslo, as they managed to win only eight games during their campaign and ended up finishing in 12th place. In September 2025, Molde wanted Moesgaard to be their new head coach, but KFUM Oslo made it clear that they would not let him go to Molde at that point. Moesgaard regarded the attention as flattering, and was sure Molde was a great club and place to be, but kept calm about the rumours, his focus being on the next game.

=== Return to Vålerenga ===
On 13 May 2026, Moesgaard was presented as the new head coach at Vålerenga after their previous head coach Geir Bakke had been sacked the week prior. Moesgaard signed a four-year contract with the club that saw him return to the club after five years at KFUM Oslo. Moesgaards first game in charge came only days later, against Sarpsborg 08, where Vålerenga went on to win the game 3–2, securing Moesgaard a win in his first game in charge.

== Coaching statistics ==
As of match played 21 November 2026

| Team | From | To | Record | | | | | Ref. |
| Team | From | To | P | W | D | L | Win % | Ref. |
|---|---|---|---|---|---|---|---|---|
| KFUM Oslo | 1 January 2023 | 12 May 2026 | 117 | 48 | 35 | 34 | 41.03 | |
| Vålerenga | 13 May 2026 | Present | 22 | 9 | 3 | 10 | 40.91 | |
| Total | | | 139 | 57 | 38 | 44 | 41.01 | — |

== Honours ==
KFUM Oslo

- Norwegian First Division runner-up 2023

Individual

- Norwegian First Division Coach of the Month: June 2023, September 2023
- Norwegian First Division Coach of the Year: 2023
- Eliteserien Coach of the Month: July 2024
- Eliteserien Coach of the Year: 2024
