= Kennedy Okpaleke =

Swedish footballer

Personal information
- Full name: Ikechukwu Kennedy David Okpaleke
- Date of birth: 16 November 2008 (age 17)
- Place of birth: Gothenburg, Sweden
- Height: 1.95 m (6 ft 5 in)
- Position: Centre-back

Team information
- Current team: Fredrikstad FK
- Number: 2

Youth career
- –2021: Götaholms BK

Senior career*
Years	Team	Apps	(Gls)
2022–2023	Götaholms BK	9	(1)
2024	Lindome GIF	14	(0)
2025–	Fredrikstad FK	8	(0)

International career^{‡}
2023	Sweden U15	1	(0)
2024	Sweden U16	1	(0)
2025–	Sweden U18	2	(0)
- * Club domestic league appearances and goals as of 7 May 2026 ‡ National team caps and goals as of 11 October 2025

Ikechukwu Kennedy David Okpaleke (born 16 November 2008) is a Swedish professional footballer who plays as a centre-back for Eliteserien club Fredrikstad FK.

== Club career ==
After trialling with IFK Göteborg, Okpaleke signed with Eliteserien club Fredrikstad FK starting 1 January 2025.

== International career ==
Okpaleke is a youth international for Sweden. He is also eligible to represent Nigeria internationally.

== Personal life ==
Okpaleke is of Nigerian descent.
