= 2026 Hamarkameratene season =

HamKam
2026 season
- Chairman: Truls Nordby Johansen
- Head coach: Thomas Myhre
- Stadium: Briskeby Stadion
- Eliteserien: 5th
- 2025–26 Norwegian Cup: Fourth round
- 2026–27 Norwegian Cup: Pre-season
| Home colours | Away colours |

The 2026 season is the 108th season in the history of Hamarkameratene and the fifth consecutive season in the Eliteserien. In addition, Hamarkameratene will participate in the 2026–27 Norwegian Football Cup. The team also completed its participation in the 2025–26 Norwegian Football Cup, where it was eliminated in the fourth round.

== Transfers ==
=== In ===
| Pos. | Player | Transferred from | Fee | Date | Source |
|---|---|---|---|---|---|
| FW | (Norway) Henrik Udahl | (Norway) KFUM Oslo | Loan return | 31 December 2025 | |
| DF | (Norway) Ilir Kukleci | (Norway) Haugesund | | 2 January 2026 | |
| DF | (Norway) Martin Gjone | (Norway) Sandefjord | ~NOK 1.5 million | 16 January 2026 | |
| DF | (United States) Ian Hoffmann | (Poland) Lech Poznań | Loan | 16 January 2026 | |
| MF | (Switzerland) Loris Mettler | (Norway) Sandefjord | | 2 February 2026 | |
| DF | (Norway) Anders Trondsen | (Sweden) IFK Göteborg | | 27 February 2026 | |
| MF | (Canada) Patrick Metcalfe | Unattached | | 4 April 2026 | |
| FW | (Nigeria) David Benjamin | | | 20 April 2026 | |

=== Out ===
| Pos. | Player | Transferred to | Fee | Date | Source |
|---|---|---|---|---|---|
| DF | (Sweden) Gustav Granath | (Greece) Panetolikos | | 2 January 2026 | |
| MF | (Kosovo) Ylldren Ibrahimaj | (Norway) Lillestrøm | | 5 January 2026 | |

== Pre-season and friendlies ==
| 30 January 2026 Friendly | Lillestrøm | 1–0 | HamKam |

| 6 February 2026 Friendly | Kongsvinger | 0–2 | HamKam |

| 13 February 2026 Friendly | HamKam | 2–3 | Sarpsborg 08 |

| 18 February 2026 Friendly | Kristiansund | 2–1 | HamKam |

| 25 February 2026 Friendly | Haugesund | 0–2 | HamKam |

| 1 March 2026 Friendly | HamKam | 4–0 | Lyn |

| 26 March 2026 Friendly | Sarpsborg 08 | 2–2 | HamKam |

| 20 June 2026 Friendly | Fredrikstad | 1–1 | HamKam | Fredrikstad |
| 14:00 | 55' | | 15' | Stadium: Fredrikstad Stadion |

| 27 June 2026 Friendly | IFK Göteborg (Sweden) | 1–2 | HamKam |
| 15:00 |

== Competitions ==
=== Overall record ===
| Competition | First match | Last match | Starting round | Final position | Record | | | | | | | |
| Competition | First match | Last match | Starting round | Final position | Pld | W | D | L | GF | GA | GD | Win % |
|---|---|---|---|---|---|---|---|---|---|---|---|---|
| Eliteserien | 14 March 2026 | | Matchday 1 | | 10 | 5 | 2 | 3 | 17 | 16 | +1 | 50.00 |
| 2025–26 Norwegian Football Cup | 7 March 2026 | | Fourth round | Fourth round | 1 | 0 | 0 | 1 | 0 | 2 | −2 | 0.00 |
| 2026–27 Norwegian Football Cup | | | | | 0 | 0 | 0 | 0 | 0 | 0 | +0 | — |
| Total | | | | | 11 | 5 | 2 | 4 | 17 | 18 | −1 | 45.45 |

Last updated: 29 May 2026
Source: Competitions

=== Eliteserien ===
| Pos | Team | Pld | W | D | L | GF | GA | GD | Pts | Qualification or relegation |
|---|---|---|---|---|---|---|---|---|---|---|
| 4 | Lillestrøm | 11 | 6 | 1 | 4 | 17 | 11 | +6 | 19 | Qualification for the Conference League second qualifying round |
| 5 | Molde | 11 | 6 | 1 | 4 | 18 | 13 | +5 | 19 | |
| 6 | HamKam | 10 | 5 | 2 | 3 | 17 | 16 | +1 | 17 | |
| 7 | Sarpsborg | 11 | 4 | 2 | 5 | 13 | 16 | −3 | 14 | |
| 8 | Sandefjord | 11 | 4 | 2 | 5 | 10 | 13 | −3 | 14 | |

Updated to match(es) played on 30 May 2026. Source: Football Association of Norway (in Norwegian)
Rules for classification: 1) Points; 2) Goal difference; 3) Goals scored; 4) Head-to-head points; 5) Head-to-head goal difference; 6) Head-to-head goals scored.

==== Results summary ====
| Overall | | | | | | | | Home | | | | | | Away | | | | | |
| Pld | W | D | L | GF | GA | GD | Pts | W | D | L | GF | GA | GD | W | D | L | GF | GA | GD |
|---|---|---|---|---|---|---|---|---|---|---|---|---|---|---|---|---|---|---|---|
| 10 | 5 | 2 | 3 | 17 | 16 | +1 | 17 | 5 | 0 | 1 | 12 | 7 | +5 | 0 | 2 | 2 | 5 | 9 | −4 |

Last updated: 29 May 2026.

==== Results by round ====
| Round | 1 | 2 | 3 | 4 | 5 | 6 | 7 | 8 | 9 | 10 | 11 |
|---|---|---|---|---|---|---|---|---|---|---|---|
| Ground | H | A | H | A | H | H | A | H | A | H | A |
| Result | W | P | L | L | W | W | D | W | L | W | D |
| Position | | | | | | | | | | | |

Updated to match(es) played on 29 May 2026. Source:
A = Away; H = Home; W = Win; D = Draw; L = Loss

==== Matches ====
The match schedule was issued on 19 December 2025.

| 14 March 2026 1 | HamKam | 2–1 | Viking |

| 6 April 2026 2 | HamKam | 1–5 | Brann |

| 12 April 2026 4 | Molde | 4–1 | HamKam |

| 19 April 2026 5 | HamKam | 4–0 | KFUM Oslo |

| 26 April 2026 6 | HamKam | 2–1 | Start |

| 3 May 2026 7 | Kristiansund | 1–1 | HamKam |

| 8 May 2026 8 | HamKam | 1–0 | Vålerenga |

| 16 May 2026 9 | Fredrikstad | 2–1 | HamKam |

| 25 May 2026 10 | HamKam | 2–0 | Lillestrøm |

| 29 May 2026 11 | Aalesund | 2–2 | HamKam | Ålesund |
| 19:00 | | | | Stadium: Color Line Stadion; Referee: Mathias Støfringshaug |

=== Norwegian Football Cup ===
==== 2025–26 ====
| 7 March 2026 Fourth round | HamKam | 0–2 | Lillestrøm |

==== 2026–27 ====
| 22–23 August 2026 First round | Trysil | v | HamKam |
