= Emil Holten =

Danish footballer (born 1996)

Personal information
- Full name: Emil Frost Holten
- Date of birth: 8 August 1996 (age 30)
- Place of birth: Virum, Denmark
- Height: 1.95 m (6 ft 5 in)
- Position: Forward

Team information
- Current team: Hansa Rostock
- Number: 11

Youth career
- 2000–2008: Virum-Sorgenfri BK
- 2008–2012: Lyngby
- 2012–2015: AB

Senior career*
| Years | Team | Apps | (Gls) |
| 2015–2017 | AB | 42 | (6) |
| 2017–2019 | Nykøbing | 50 | (15) |
| 2019–2021 | Silkeborg | 46 | (12) |
| 2021–2024 | Esbjerg | 74 | (37) |
| 2024–2026 | IF Elfsborg | 8 | (2) |
| 2025 | → Fredrikstad (loan) | 18 | (4) |
| 2025–2026 | → Hansa Rostock (loan) | 33 | (15) |
| 2026– | Hansa Rostock | 0 | (0) |
- * Club domestic league appearances and goals as of 28 May 2026

Emil Frost Holten (born 8 August 1996) is a Danish professional footballer who plays as a forward for German 3. Liga club Hansa Rostock.

== Honours ==
Esbjerg fB

- Danish 2nd Division: 2023–24
