= Martin Børsheim =

Norwegian footballer (born 2005)

Personal information
- Date of birth: 18 February 2005 (age 21)
- Height: 1.94 m (6 ft 4 in)
- Position: Goalkeeper

Team information
- Current team: Fredrikstad
- Number: 77

Youth career
- –2018: Fyllingsdalen
- 2020–2024: Brann

Senior career*
Years	Team	Apps	(Gls)
2021–2025	Brann 2	70	(0)
2024–2025	Brann	0	(0)
2025–	Fredrikstad	25	(0)

International career^{‡}
2021	Norway U16	2	(0)
2022	Norway U17	1	(0)
2023	Norway U18	6	(0)
2024	Norway U19	8	(0)
2025–	Norway U21	13	(0)
- * Club domestic league appearances and goals as of 17 July 2026 ‡ National team caps and goals as of 14 November 2026

Martin Børsheim (born 18 February 2005) is a Norwegian footballer who plays as a goalkeeper for Fredrikstad.

He played youth football for FK Fyllingsdalen before joining the U16 team of city giants SK Brann. With the U19 team he won the 2024 Norwegian Youth Cup, saving a penalty in the penalty shootout. He made his debut for the senior reserve team, Brann 2, in 2021 and from 2022 he played a majority of their games on the third and fourth tiers. He was included in Brann's senior squad as second goalkeeper ahead of the 2024 season, and made his senior debut for Brann in the 2025 Norwegian Football Cup against Varegg. With Brann having a local first-choice goalkeeper who was also in contention for the Norwegian national, a sale of Børsheim was seen as sensible.

Eliteserien competitors Fredrikstad sold their goalkeeper Jonathan Fischer in late July 2025. His replacement Valdemar Birksø sustained a long-term injury already in his first game. Fredrikstad bought Martin Børsheim on 6 August, with the goalkeeper making his debut on the next day, in the Europa League no less. Børsheim had still not played higher than the Norwegian third tier when facing FC Midtjylland in the 2025–26 UEFA Europa League third qualifying round.

Fredrikstad later let Valdemar Birksø go, leaving Børsheim as their "undisputed" starting goalkeeeper. In May 2026, he extended his contract with a further two years.

Børsheim played his first international match in September 2022 for Norway U16. He was later selected for the 2024 UEFA European Under-19 Championship. Børsheim's debut for Norway U21 followed in March 2025.
