= Benjamin Faraas =

Norwegian footballer (born 2005)

Personal information
- Full name: Benjamin Thoresen Faraas
- Date of birth: 8 September 2005 (age 21)
- Place of birth: Flisa, Norway
- Height: 1.80 m (5 ft 11 in)
- Position: Midfielder

Team information
- Current team: Fredikstad
- Number: 7

Youth career
- 2017–2021: Flisa
- 2021: HamKam

Senior career*
Years	Team	Apps	(Gls)
2021–2023	HamKam 2	29	(13)
2021–2023	HamKam	23	(2)
2023–2025	Club NXT	37	(3)
2025–	Fredrikstad	20	(4)

International career^{‡}
2021	Norway U16	8	(3)
2021	Norway U17	9	(3)
2022–2023	Norway U18	8	(3)
2023–2024	Norway U19	16	(5)
2024–	Norway U20	3	(0)
- * Club domestic league appearances and goals as of 31 August 2026 ‡ National team caps and goals as of 10:39, 18 September 2025 (UTC)

Benjamin Thoresen Faraas (born 8 September 2005) is a Norwegian professional footballer who plays as a midfielder for Fredrikstad.

== Club career ==
Faraas started off in the youth teams of Flisa before joining HamKam in 2021. He started by representing their second team in the Norwegian Fourth Division. He made his first team debut for HamKam in July 2021, as a substitute in a 3–0 win over Gjøvik-Lyn in the Norwegian Football Cup. In April 2022, he made his Eliteserien debut as a substitute in a 3–0 win over Sandefjord. In August 2023, Faraas joined Club NXT, the youth team of Club Brugge. On 18 January 2025, Faraas signed for Eliteserien side Fredrikstad on a four-year deal.

== International career ==
Faraas has represented Norway up to under-19 level.
