= Ulrik Fredriksen =

Norwegian football player (born 1999)

Personal information
- Full name: Ulrik Tillung Fredriksen
- Date of birth: 17 June 1999 (age 27)
- Place of birth: Bergen, Norway
- Height: 1.89 m (6 ft 2 in)
- Position: Defender

Team information
- Current team: Fredrikstad
- Number: 12

Senior career*
Years	Team	Apps	(Gls)
2014–2015	Sædalen	24	(9)
2016	Fyllingsdalen	14	(1)
2017–2019	Sogndal	68	(3)
2020–2025	Haugesund	113	(3)
2025–	Fredrikstad	43	(3)

International career^{‡}
2017	Norway U18	2	(0)
2018	Norway U19	6	(0)
2019	Norway U20	5	(0)
2018	Norway U21	1	(0)
- * Club domestic league appearances and goals as of 23 July 2026 ‡ National team caps and goals as of 25 May 2019

Ulrik Tillung Fredriksen (born 17 June 1999) is a Norwegian footballer who plays as a defender for Fredrikstad FK.

== Career ==
=== Sædalen ===
Fredriksen started his senior career out with 6. Divisjon side Sædalen. In his first season with the club, he made 5 appearances and scored 2 goals, helping the team to promotion. The next season, he appeared 19 times, scoring 7 goals.

=== Fyllingsdalen ===
Fredriksen then moved to FK Fyllingsdalen in 2016. In 14 appearances in the PostNord-Ligaen, he found the net once.

=== Sogndal ===
For the 2017 season, Fredriksen moved to Sogndal. He made his Eliteserien debut on 7 May 2017 in a 0-0 draw with FK Haugesund. He was sent off in the 75th minute following a bad foul.

=== Haugesund ===
On 13 January 2020 Fredriksen signed with Haugesund.

== Career statistics ==
As of 6 November 2025

Club	Season	Division	League		Cup		Total	
Club	Season	Division	Apps	Goals	Apps	Goals	Apps	Goals
Sædalen	2014	6. divisjon	5	2	0	0	5	2
Sædalen	2015	5. divisjon	19	7	0	0	19	7
Sædalen	Total		24	9	0	0	24	9
Fyllingsdalen	2016	2. divisjon	14	1	0	0	14	1
Fyllingsdalen	Total		14	1	0	0	14	1
Sogndal	2017	Eliteserien	16	0	3	0	19	0
Sogndal	2018	1. divisjon	26	2	2	0	28	2
Sogndal	2019	1. divisjon	26	1	2	0	28	1
Sogndal	Total		68	3	7	0	75	3
Haugesund	2020	Eliteserien	22	1	0	0	22	1
Haugesund	2021	Eliteserien	27	1	1	1	28	2
Haugesund	2022	Eliteserien	14	0	3	0	17	0
Haugesund	2023	Eliteserien	20	1	3	0	23	1
Haugesund	2024	Eliteserien	30	0	0	0	30	0
Haugesund	Total		113	3	7	1	120	4
Fredrikstad	2025	Eliteserien	27	2	4	0	31	2
Fredrikstad	Total		27	2	4	0	31	2
Career Total			246	18	18	1	264	19
