= Jóannes Bjartalíð =

Faroese footballer (born 1996)

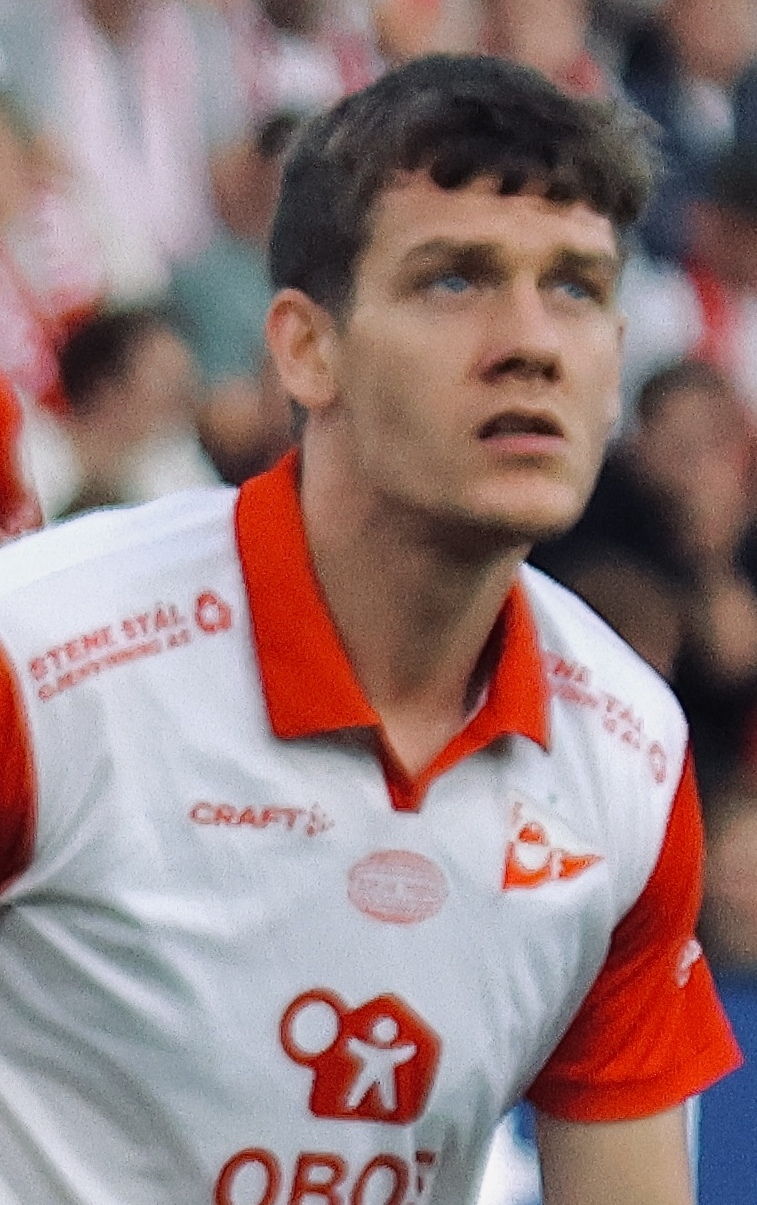
- Bjartalíð in 2025

Personal information
- Date of birth: 10 July 1996 (age 30)
- Place of birth: Klaksvík, Faroe Islands
- Position: Attacking midfielder

Team information
- Current team: FC Kyzylzhar
- Number: 10

Senior career*
Years	Team	Apps	(Gls)
2015–2023	KÍ	254	(120)
2023–2026	Fredrikstad	56	(12)
2026–	FC Kyzylzhar	27	(4)

International career^{‡}
2015–2018	Faroe Islands U21	18	(0)
2019–	Faroe Islands	48	(3)
- * Club domestic league appearances and goals as of 1 November 2026 ‡ National team caps and goals as of 16 November 2026

Jóannes Bjartalíð (born 10 July 1996) is a Faroese professional footballer who plays as a midfielder for FC Kyzylzhar and the Faroe Islands national team. (Note: Jóannes Bjartalíð at WorldFootball.net)

== Career ==
Bjartalíð started his career at his hometown side KÍ, scoring 104 goals in 210 appearances and playing a crucial role as KÍ rose to become one of the most dominant sides in the Faroe Islands. He would transfer to Fredrikstad in 2022; the club are managed by Mikkjal Thomassen, his old manager at KÍ. Bjartalíð impressed in his debut season as Fredrikstad won promotion to the Eliteserien, winning the club's player of the year. He was a member of the Fredrikstad team that won the 2024 Norwegian Football Cup final, scoring a penalty in the shootout. Bjartalíð made his international debut for Faroe Islands on 5 September 2019 in a UEFA Euro 2020 qualifying match against Sweden, which finished as a 4–0 home loss. He scored his first two goals for the country in a 2–2 draw with Luxembourg in the 2022–23 UEFA Nations League C. In 2026, he left Fredrikstad and joined FC Kyzylzhar in Kazakhstan.

== Career statistics ==
=== Club ===
As of 2 July 2026

Appearances and goals by club, season and competition
Club	Season	League			National cup (Note: Including Faroe Islands Cup, Norwegian Cup)		Europe		Other		Total	
Club	Season	Division	Apps	Goals	Apps	Goals	Apps	Goals	Apps	Goals	Apps	Goals
KÍ	2014	Faroe Islands Premier League	0	0	1	0	—		—		1	0
KÍ	2015	Faroe Islands Premier League	27	8	1	0	—		—		28	8
KÍ	2016	Faroe Islands Premier League	26	17	5	5	—		—		31	22
KÍ	2017	Faroe Islands Premier League	27	8	4	2	2 (Note: Appearances in UEFA Europa League)	0	1 (Note: Appearances in Faroe Islands Super Cup)	0	34	10
KÍ	2018	Faroe Islands Premier League	26	8	1	0	3	1	—		30	9
KÍ	2019	Faroe Islands Premier League	27	18	4	2	6	3	—		37	23
KÍ	2020	Faroe Islands Premier League	27	15	1	0	4 (Note: Two appearances in UEFA Champions League, two appearances in UEFA Europa League)	0	1	0	33	15
KÍ	2021	Faroe Islands Premier League	24	13	1	0	—		—		25	13
KÍ	2022	Faroe Islands Premier League	26	17	5	2	6 (Note: Two appearances in UEFA Champions League, four appearances in UEFA Europa Conference League)	0	1	1	38	20
KÍ	Total		210	104	23	11	21	4	3	1	257	120
Fredrikstad	2023	1. divisjon	27	11	3	1	—		—		30	12
Fredrikstad	2024	Eliteserien	11	0	3	0	—		—		14	0
Fredrikstad	2025	Eliteserien	17	1	0	0	4 (Note: Two appearances and one goal in UEFA Europa League and two appearances in UEFA Conference League)	1	—		21	2
Fredrikstad	Total		55	12	6	1	4	1	—		65	14
Kyzylzhar	2026	Kazakhstan Premier League	15	3	1	0	—		—		16	3
Career total			280	119	30	12	25	5	3	1	338	137

=== International ===
As of 16 November 2026

Faroe Islands
Year	Apps	Goals
2019	6	0
2020	7	0
2021	4	0
2022	6	2
2023	8	0
2024	4	1
2025	4	0
2026	9	0
Total	48	3

Scores and results list Faroe Islands goal tally first.

List of international goals scored by Jóannes Bjartalíð
No.	Date	Venue	Opponent	Score	Result	Competition
1	14 June 2022	Stade de Luxembourg, Luxembourg City, Luxembourg	Luxembourg	1–2	2–2	2022–23 UEFA Nations League C
2	14 June 2022	Stade de Luxembourg, Luxembourg City, Luxembourg	Luxembourg	2–2	2–2	2022–23 UEFA Nations League C
3	10 October 2024	Tórsvøllur, Tórshavn, Faroe Islands	Armenia	2–1	2–2	2024–25 UEFA Nations League C

== Honours ==
KÍ

- Faroe Islands Premier League: 2019, 2021, 2022
- Faroe Islands Cup: 2016; runner-up: 2022
- Faroe Islands Super Cup: 2020, 2022; runner-up: 2017

Fredrikstad

- Norwegian First Division: 2023
- Norwegian Cup: 2024

Individual

- Norwegian First Division Player of the Month: October 2023
- Norwegian First Division Player of the Year: 2023
