= Henrik Skogvold =

Norwegian footballer (born 2004)

Personal information
- Full name: Henrik Langaas Skogvold
- Date of birth: 14 July 2004 (age 22)
- Place of birth: Kjeller, Norway
- Height: 1.76 m (5 ft 9 in)
- Position: Forward

Team information
- Current team: Fredrikstad
- Number: 23

Youth career
- –2021: Lillestrøm

Senior career*
Years	Team	Apps	(Gls)
2021–2024	Lillestrøm	38	(1)
2023	→ Start (loan)	8	(6)
2024–	Fredrikstad	68	(7)

International career^{‡}
2021	Norway U17	4	(0)
2022	Norway U18	7	(1)
2023	Norway U19	4	(1)
2023	Norway U20	3	(1)
2025–	Norway U21	11	(3)
- * Club domestic league appearances and goals as of 14 November 2026 ‡ National team caps and goals as of 14 November 2026

Henrik Langaas Skogvold (born 14 July 2004) is a Norwegian professional footballer who plays as a forward for Fredrikstad.

== Playing career ==
Hailing from Kjeller, he played youth football for Lillestrøm SK. Skogvold made his senior debut in the 2021 Norwegian Football Cup against Fu/Vo, and subsequently his Eliteserien debut in August 2021 against Haugesund. In the same year he made his debut as a Norway youth international. In 2022 he scored his first youth international goal, against Portugal U18.

In April 2023, the second-tier club IK Start lost their on-loan forward Jack Lahne to a long-term injury. A "national youth loan" was agreed with Lillestrøm, which saw Skogvold move to Start on a short-term loan outside of the transfer windows. Skogvold trained once with Start before making his debut, and got his breakthrough in Norwegian football with 5 goals in the first 5 games. He was hailed as a "super signing" and gave Start hopes of promotion to the 2024 Eliteserien.

== Career statistics ==
=== Club ===
As of match played 8 November 2026

Appearances and goals by club, season and competition
Club	Season	League			Norwegian Cup		Continental		Total	
Club	Season	Division	Apps	Goals	Apps	Goals	Apps	Goals	Apps	Goals
Lillestrøm	2021	Eliteserien	3	0	0	0	—		3	0
Lillestrøm	2022	Eliteserien	4	0	0	0	2 (Note: Appearance(s) in UEFA Europa Conference League)	0	6	0
Lillestrøm	2023	Eliteserien	18	1	0	0	—		18	1
Lillestrøm	2024	Eliteserien	13	0	2	0	—		15	0
Lillestrøm	Total		38	1	2	0	2	0	42	1
Start (loan)	2023	Norwegian First Division	8	6	0	0	—		8	6
Fredrikstad	2024	Eliteserien	12	2	3	0	—		15	2
Fredrikstad	2025	Eliteserien	30	5	6	3	4	0	40	8
Fredrikstad	2026	Eliteserien	26	0	3	2	—		29	2
Fredrikstad	Total		68	7	12	5	4	0	84	12
Career total			114	14	14	5	6	0	134	19

== Honours ==
Individual

- Norwegian First Division Player of the Month: May 2023
