= Sondre Sørløkk =

Norwegian footballer (born 1997)

Personal information
- Full name: Sondre Sørløkk
- Date of birth: 8 May 1997 (age 29)
- Position: Midfielder

Team information
- Current team: Fredrikstad
- Number: 13

Youth career
- -2013: Meldal

Senior career*
Years	Team	Apps	(Gls)
2013	Meldal	12	(1)
2013-2016	Orkla	74	(32)
2016-2021	Ranheim	72	(3)
2019	→ Stjørdals-Blink (loan)	9	(5)
2021-2023	Ull/Kisa	60	(29)
2023-	Fredrikstad	83	(13)
- * Club domestic league appearances and goals as of 23 July 2026

Sondre Sørløkk (born 8 May 1997) is a Norwegian footballer who plays as a midfielder for Fredrikstad.

== Career ==
Sørløkk started his career at Meldal as a junior, he then moved to Orkla in 2013. Sørløkk signed with Ranheim in 2016.

Sørløkk made his debut for Ranheim in Eliteserien in a 4–1 win against Stabæk.

Halfway through the 2023 season, Sørlokk signed with 1. divisjon side Fredrikstad, keeping him at the club until the end of 2025.

== Career statistics ==
As of 6 November 2025

Appearances and goals by club, season and competition
Club	Season	Division	League		National Cup		Other		Total	
Club	Season	Division	Apps	Goals	Apps	Goals	Apps	Goals	Apps	Goals
Meldal	2013	3. divisjon	12	1	1	0	—		13	1
Orkla	2013	3. divisjon	9	1	0	0	—		9	1
Orkla	2014	3. divisjon	24	9	3	0	—		27	9
Orkla	2015	3. divisjon	25	17	1	0	—		26	17
Orkla	2016	3. divisjon	16	5	2	1	—		18	6
Orkla	Total		74	32	6	1	—		80	33
Ranheim	2016	1. divisjon	7	1	0	0	—		7	1
Ranheim	2017	1. divisjon	21	0	2	0	4 (Note: Appearances in Eliteserien play-offs)	0	27	0
Ranheim	2018	Eliteserien	17	0	4	1	—		21	1
Ranheim	2019	Eliteserien	6	0	4	1	—		10	1
Ranheim	2020	1. divisjon	21	2	—		2	0	23	2
Ranheim	Total		72	3	10	2	6	0	88	5
Stjørdals-Blink (loan)	2019	2. divisjon	9	5	0	0	—		9	5
Ull/Kisa	2021	1. divisjon	27	6	2	1	—		29	7
Ull/Kisa	2022	2. divisjon	26	20	3	1	2 (Note: Appearances in 2 divisjon promotion play-offs)	0	31	21
Ull/Kisa	2023	2. divisjon	7	3	2	2	—		9	5
Ull/Kisa	Total		60	29	7	4	2	0	69	33
Fredrikstad	2023	1. divisjon	14	5	0	0	—		14	5
Fredrikstad	2024	Eliteserien	29	3	6	1	—		35	4
Fredrikstad	2025	Eliteserien	26	5	5	0	4 (Note: Appearances in UEFA Europa League and UEFA Conference League)	0	35	5
Fredrikstad	Total		69	13	11	1	4	0	84	14
Career total			296	83	35	8	12	0	343	91

== Honours ==
Fredrikstad

- Norwegian Cup: 2024

Individual

- Norwegian First Division Player of the Month: August 2023
