= Daniel Eid =

Norwegian footballer (born 1998)

Personal information
- Full name: Daniel Fritz Eid
- Date of birth: 14 October 1998 (age 28)
- Position: Wing-back

Team information
- Current team: Fredrikstad
- Number: 16

Youth career
- –2016: Hødd

Senior career*
Years	Team	Apps	(Gls)
2017–2019	Hødd	64	(3)
2020–2021	Sogndal	59	(7)
2022–2024	IFK Norrköping	56	(1)
2024–	Fredrikstad	55	(3)
- * Club domestic league appearances and goals as of 23 July 2026

Daniel Eid (born 14 October 1998) is a Norwegian footballer who plays as a defender for Fredrikstad.

== Career ==
He hails from Ulsteinvik as a son of former IL Hødd player Sindre Eid, and came up through the youth system of Hødd. He made his debut in the 2017 2. divisjon opener against Vard, with his father managing the team at the time. He also studied at Volda University College while playing on the third tier.

Following several seasons in Hødd, Eid moved up one tier to First Division club Sogndal in the winter of 2020. He scored on his debut, which came as late as July 2020 as the season was postponed because of COVID-19. Eid was nominated to win the 1. divisjon Breakthrough of the Year award.

Throughout 2021 he was scouted by Djurgårdens IF, who contemplated a transfer offer. He ultimately signed for Allsvenskan club IFK Norrköping. The fact that "Peking" employed a formation with wing-backs weighed in on his decision. Manager Rikard Norling reasoned behind the signing; "He has a strong running capacity, a good eye for the game" as well as a "sound tactical base".

== Honours ==
Fredrikstad

- Norwegian Cup: 2024
