= Fredrikstad Stadion =

Norwegian football stadium in Fredrikstad

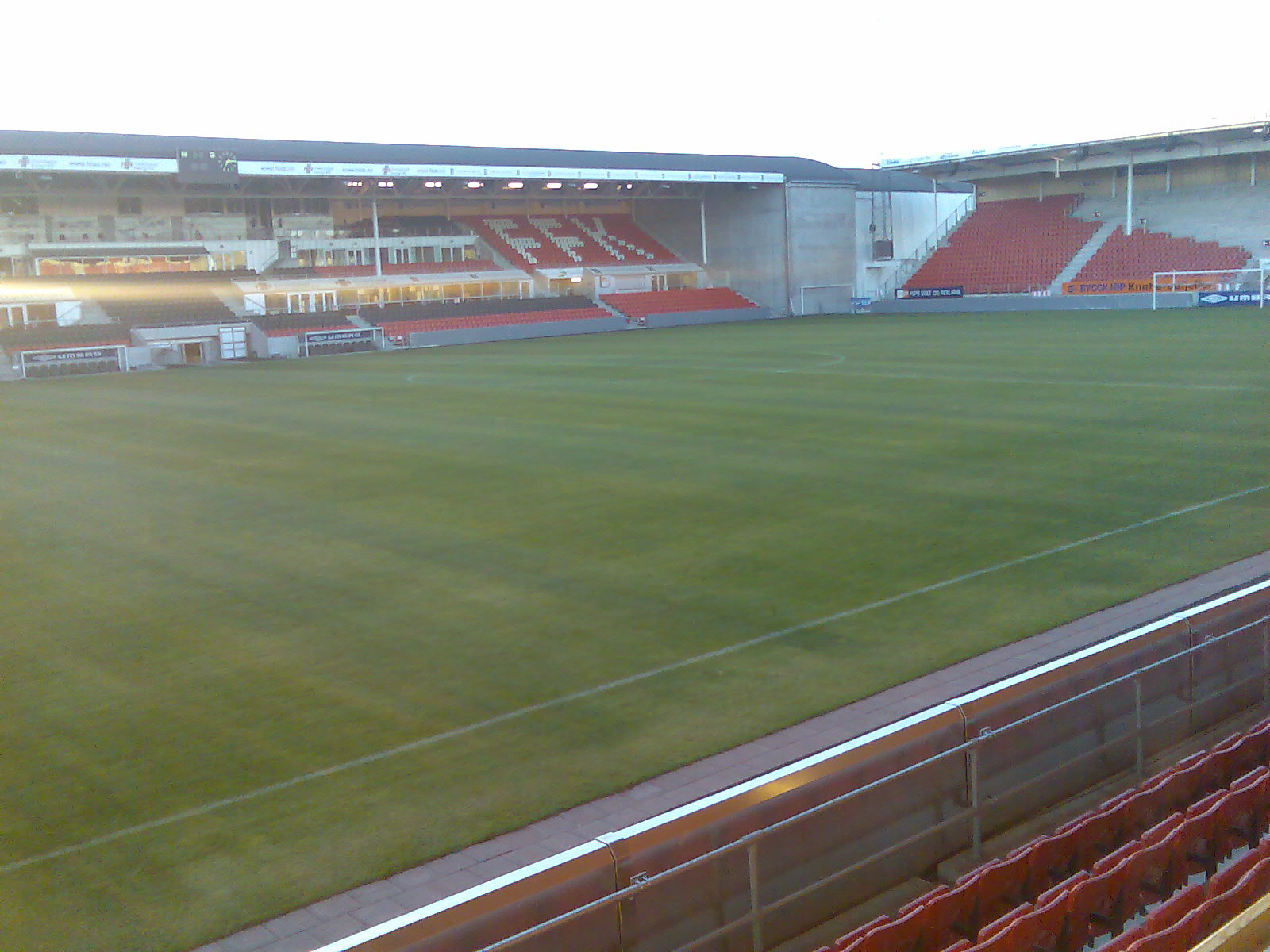
- Interactive map of Fredrikstad Stadion
- Coordinates: 59°12′47″N 10°55′41″E
- Capacity: 12,560 (by March 2009)

Construction
- Built: 2007
- Opened: 1 February 2007

Tenant
- Fredrikstad FK (football)

The Fredrikstad Stadion is a football stadium in Fredrikstad, Norway and home of the Norwegian First Division team Fredrikstad FK. It is located in an area which formerly used to be a large shipyard (locally known as Værste or FMV), but which nowadays is the technological centre of the city, with several companies and a college. The frontage of the stadium is built to replicate the original halls of the workshop. This makes it architecturally unique. The stadium was built to replace Old Fredrikstad Stadion, which was considered to be one of the eldest and most worn-out stadium in the country. The total capacity is approximately 12,560, all seated. There is a possibility to expand it furthermore, to some 15,000 seats.

The venue has hosted Norway national under-21 football team matches five times, playing 0–1 against Netherlands on 7 September 2007, 2–1 against Switzerland on 12 September 2007, 0–0 against Macedonia on 9 September 2008, 1–3 against Croatia on 5 September 2009 and 0–1 against Serbia on 9 September 2009. In a 2012 survey carried out by the Norwegian Players' Association among away-team captains, Fredrikstad Stadion was ranked as the sixth, with a score of 4.20 on a scale from one to five.

== Concerts ==
- Elton John performed on Fredrikstad stadion on 22 June 2007.
- The Norwegian rap duo Erik og Kriss performed a free concert at the stadium on 22 January 2017.

== Attendance ==
	Norwegian Premier League
†	Norwegian First Division

Attendance
Season	Avg	Min	Max	Rank	Ref
2007	11,798	10,251	12,403	5	
2008	11,530	10,108	12,350	5	
2009	10,313	9,107	12,058	5	
2010	6,806	5,506	10,690	1†	
2011	9,119	6,863	12,565	7	
2012	7,110	5,432	9,215	7	
2013	4,245	3,767	5,002	1†	
2014	4,313	3,742	5,005	1†	
2015	4,332	3,528	8,281	2†	
2016	4,342	3,524	7,832	1†	
2017	3,913	3,136	7,722	2†	
