= Fredrikstad FK =

Association football club in Fredrikstad, Norway

Fredrikstad
- Full name: Fredrikstad Fotballklubb
- Nicknames: Aristokratene (The Aristocrats); Rødbuksene (The Red Shorts)
- Short name: F.F.K.
- Founded: 7 April 1903; 123 years ago
- Ground: Fredrikstad Stadion; Fredrikstad
- Capacity: 12,565
- Chairman: Jostein Lunde
- Head coach: Casper Røjkjær
- League: Eliteserien
- 2025: Eliteserien, 8th of 16
- Website: www.fredrikstadfk.no
Home colours	Away colours	Third colours

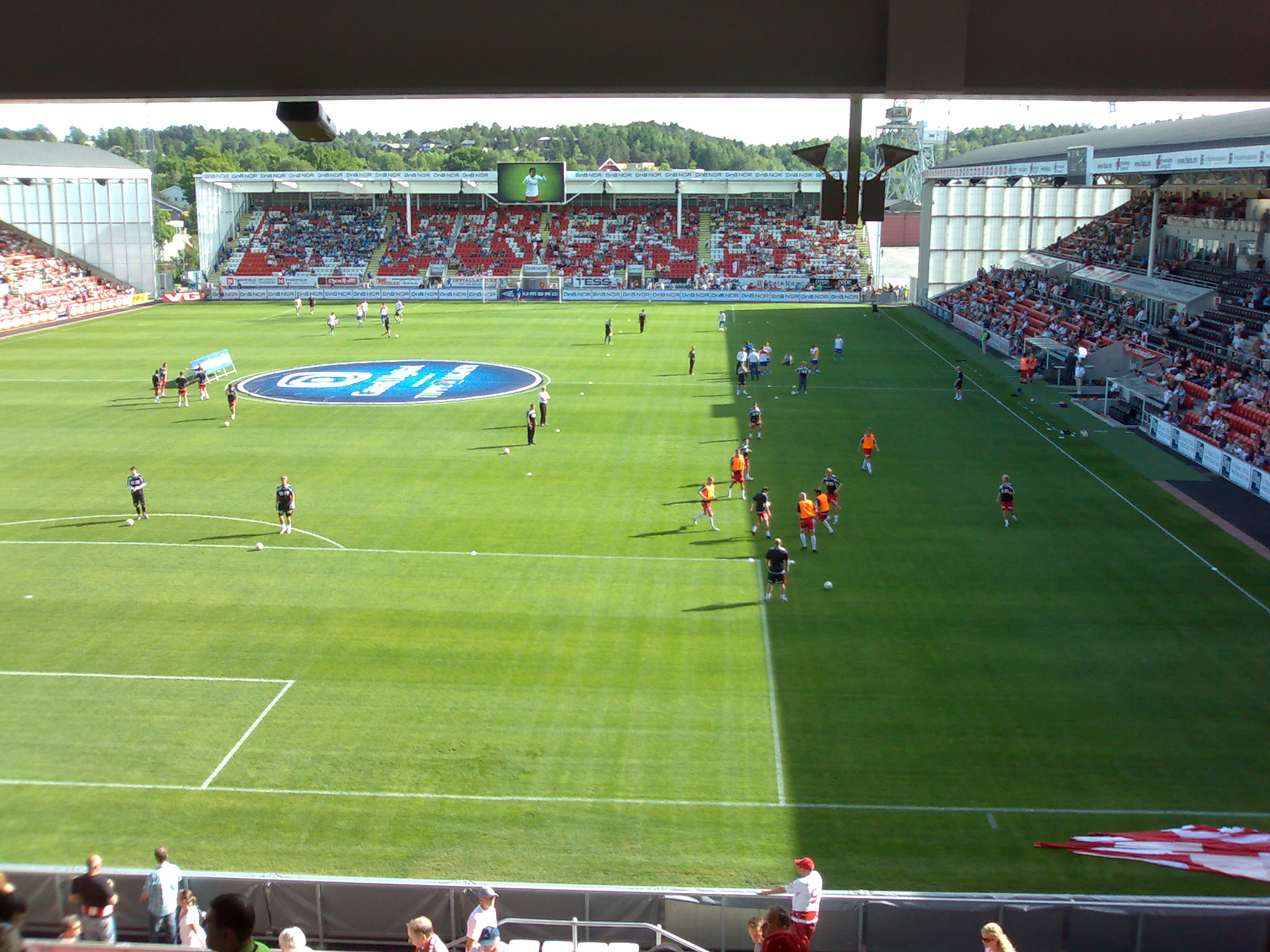
Fredrikstad Stadion

Fredrikstad Fotballklubb (also known as FFK or Fredrikstad) is a Norwegian professional football club from the town of Fredrikstad. With nine league championships and twelve Norwegian Cup wins, FFK is one of the most successful clubs in Norwegian football. The club was founded in 1903 and currently play in Eliteserien from 2024 after promotion from Norwegian First Division in 2023.

After suffering relegation from the then 1st division in 1984, Fredrikstad spent 18 years outside the top flight, before returning to the top division in 2004 after two successive promotions.

Fredrikstad stadion was FFK's home ground between 1914 and 2006. However, its facilities were outdated and the club moved to a new stadium on the other side of river Glomma. Their new ground is located in a former shipyard, incorporating parts of the old buildings in the two side stands. FFK draw great support from their area and the official supporter club's name is Plankehaugen. More than 100 coaches filled with fans followed FFK to the cup final of 2006. The club's supporters include an Ultras section, Supras Fredrikstad. The club had for some years a casual mob, Brigade Rød-Hvit (Brigade Red – White) which was active in the hooligan scene in Norway.

== History ==
Fredrikstad Fotballklubb was founded on 7 April 1903. While football in many older clubs was an addition to other established forms of sport, such as skiing or athletics, FFK was the first club in Norway to focus uniquely on playing football, and as such may be labeled the first true football club in the country. A lack of opposition meant this was in fact the third attempt at establishing a football club in Fredrikstad (tradition has it that the second attempt died out when the only football landed on a freight train bound for Moss). Finding someone in the vicinity to play against was still a problem when FFK was founded.

It so happened that the Englishman H. W. Kenworthy, who lived in the neighboring town of Sarpsborg, wanted to practice his native country's sport and traveled to Fredrikstad to take part in one of FFK's training sessions. Upon his return to Sarpsborg, it was suggested that he arrange for a new club to be established. The idea was well received in Sarpsborg, and Sarpsborg F.C. was founded on 8 May 1903. The first match between the teams was played the following year in Sarpsborg in front of 600 spectators. FFK won the historical match 4–0. Sarpsborg and Fredrikstad formed a rivalry, went on to establish the first regional series and inspired the founding of many new clubs in the region in the years to come.

FFK didn't have the red and white colors when the club was founded in 1903. In fact, they changed suits seven times from 1903 to 1927. The colors that they wear now come from Polish National team. When FFK asked Polish Football Association if they could use their colours, they received positive reply and even set of clothes in the colours as a gift.

FFK reached the Norwegian Cup final for the first time in 1932. The semifinal against Mjøndalen was played at home in front of a record 9,000 spectators, and FFK won the match 3–0. Fredrikstad met Ørn Horten in the final, winning 6–1, and were thus Norwegian Champions. This signaled the start of Fredrikstad's first successful era, in which the club claimed four more cup titles before the start of World War II. FFK became the first club to win the new nationwide league, in 1937–38, and they won The Double the following season.

In the 1930s, the club also had an active bandy department.

During the German occupation no organized football took place, as a result of all athletes going on strike in support of the resistance. After the war football was more popular than ever, and Fredrikstad set another attendance record against Sarpsborg in the semifinal of the 1945 Norwegian Cup. There was, however, little success on the pitch. FFK reached three cup finals in four years but lost all of them. The break came in 1949 when FFK won its third league title.

The 1950s and 1960s were highly successful years for FFK. The club secured the league title six times – back to back in 1950–51 and 1951–52 – and finished in second place seven times. The Norwegian Cup was won four times. In 1957, a new milestone was achieved when FFK won their second double. As league champions in 1960, Fredrikstad entered the European Cup as the first team from Norway, sensationally defeating Ajax 4–3 at home and drawing 0–0 in Amsterdam, in the first round.

The town of Fredrikstad was in many ways an economic powerhouse in Norway in the previous century, first as a major supplier of machinery to the timber industry and then as a center of shipbuilding activities. At one point the shipyard in Fredrikstad was the largest in Scandinavia. It has been said that there was always an air of optimism surrounding the town and its inhabitants, and it was certainly reflected in FFK's playful and relaxed style of football, which many regarded as the most entertaining in the country. The club's first cup triumph in '32 even made Jørgen Juve, a legend in Norwegian football, state: "This is how football is supposed to be played."

Perhaps it was because of this relaxed atmosphere that the club was so successful, and also why it eventually fell into decline. After years of glory, the club was becoming conservative, although they would not admit it themselves. Other clubs were increasingly turning to professionalism, while players from FFK still played football in addition to having normal jobs. Training regimes were becoming more rigorous than before, but in Fredrikstad, they felt that training more than twice a week would ruin the joy of playing football. There is also the sentiment that, in light of the club's formidable history, newer generations of FFK players were given too much responsibility, folding to the pressure again and again whenever things were starting to look brighter.

Fredrikstad was to struggle throughout the 1970s. They reached the cup final in 1971 but lost to Rosenborg, who was by now firmly en route to becoming a giant in Norwegian football. In 1972, they were runners-up in the league to Viking FK only on goal difference, as both teams finished the season on 34 points. In 1973, for the first time in the club's history, FFK was relegated. They immediately gained promotion via the playoffs and by 1975 were back in the highest division, where they stayed for two seasons before facing relegation yet again.

The elevator ride between divisions continued until 1984. The Norwegian Cup went to Fredrikstad that year, but it must have been a bittersweet success. The club was once again relegated, and this time they were unable to make it back to the top flight. In 1992, FFK was relegated to the third highest division, where they would languish until 2002.

Fredrikstad's comeback from obscurity is largely attributed to the manager Knut Torbjørn Eggen, who introduced a degree of professionalism the club had previously lacked. During his tenure, from 2001 until the end of 2006, the son of Rosenborg's successful former coach led the team to their first title in more than two decades. In 2002, they were promoted from the 2. divisjon to the 1. divisjon, and in 2003, their centenary year, Fredrikstad finished second, earning promotion to the top division. Although struggling to maintain their form through an entire season, Fredrikstad has managed to retain their spot three times, and in 2006 they won the Norwegian Cup for the eleventh time in their history. They came 2nd and won silver in the 2008 season, but were relegated after a poor season in 2009 to 1. division. They eventually got promoted back to Tippeligaen through playoffs in November 2010 by first beating Løv-Ham 2–0, then Hønefoss BK with a stunning 8–1 goal difference over two matches.

On 13 December 2011, the offices of the club were raided by Norwegian police in connection with the Raio Piiroja contract investigations.

After their relegation from the Eliteserien in 2012, Fredrikstad spent time in the Obos-Ligaen (2012–2017, 2021–2023) and PostNord-ligaen (2018–2020) before earning promotion back to the Eliteserien in 2024 under manager Mikkjal Thomassen.

== Colours and badge ==
In the early years of the club, Fredrikstad changed attire quite frequently. The first kit, for example, consisted of blue and white striped shirts and black shorts, but was changed after only two years, to white shirts and blue shorts. In 1910, a green and white kit was adopted ahead of the club's first semifinal in the Norwegian Cup.

The seventh and final iteration of Fredrikstad's kit was introduced after a match between Norway and Poland at Fredrikstad stadion, on 7 October 1926. Fredrikstad would request of the Polish Football Association that they use the Polish national colors for the Polish national team:

In Beantwortung Ihres w. Schreibens von Ende Dezember 1926 freuen wir uns sehr, dass Ihr hochverehrter Klub unsere Nationale Farben weiß-rot als seine Farben annehmen will. Gleichzetlich Ihrem Wünsche folgend, übersenden wir ein weißes Hemd und ein Paar roten Hosen

In response to your letter of December 1926, we are delighted that your esteemed club wants to take on our white-red national colors. Following your request we will send you a white shirt and a pair of red shorts.

The club received from the Polish association the new kit on 17 March 1927, when it became the official colors of Fredrikstad. The kit has since changed little in appearance apart from the socks, which went from being red and white to purely white in 1997.

FFK's badge, a green and white streamer with a football and the initials F.F. (the original abbreviation for Fredrikstad Fotballklubb was F.F.), has remained virtually unchanged since its introduction in 1909. When the Fredrikstad kit changed to white and red, the colours of the streamer changed as well. It is unrelated to the flag of Greenland, which has a similar design and colour scheme but was not adopted until 1985.

== Stadium ==
The old Fredrikstad stadion was inaugurated in 1914 and was the first stadium in Norway with floodlighting. FFK's record attendance was set in 1956 against Larvik Turn. 15,534 spectators showed up for this quarter-final match of the Norwegian Cup. The stadium's last renovation occurred ahead of the 2004 season, putting the capacity at around 10,500.

A new home ground was built for the 2007 season at Fredrikstad Mekaniske Verksted (colloquially known as "Værste"), an old shipyard in the center of Fredrikstad. This was once the largest shipyard in Scandinavia, and the architecture of the stadium is such that two of the now defunct mechanical workshops, dating from as far back as 1870, are converted into stands at the sides. In addition, two separate stands are built at the ends of the pitch. The new stadium (with the same name, Fredrikstad stadion) has an all-seater capacity of 12,550.

== Honours ==
- Norwegian top flight:
  - Winners (9): 1937–38, 1938–39, 1948–49, 1950–51, 1951–52, 1953–54, 1956–57, 1959–60, 1960–61
  - Runners-up (9): 1949–50, 1954–55, 1955–56, 1958–59, 1964, 1966, 1969, 1972, 2008
  - Third (1): 1961–62
- Norwegian First Division:
  - Winner (1): 2023
- Norwegian Cup:
  - Winners (12) joint-record: 1932, 1935, 1936, 1938, 1940, 1950, 1957, 1961, 1966, 1984, 2006, 2024
  - Runners-up (7): 1945, 1946, 1948, 1954, 1963, 1969, 1971

== Recent history ==
Season		Pos.	Pl.	W	D	L	GS	GA	P	Cup	Notes
2003	1. divisjon	↑ 2	30	19	5	6	68	37	62	Third round	Promoted to the Tippeligaen
2004	Tippeligaen	10	26	9	5	12	42	54	32	Third round	
2005	Tippeligaen	11	26	8	7	11	35	44	31	Fourth round	
2006	Tippeligaen	8	26	8	8	10	38	46	32	Winner	
2007	Tippeligaen	8	26	9	9	9	37	40	36	Third round	
2008	Tippeligaen	2	26	14	6	6	38	28	48	Quarterfinal	
2009	Tippeligaen	↓ 14	30	10	4	16	39	44	34	Fourth round	Relegated to the 1. divisjon
2010	1. divisjon	↑ 3	28	14	8	6	53	37	50	Fourth round	Promoted to the Tippeligaen through playoffs
2011	Tippeligaen	12	30	10	6	14	38	41	36	Semifinal	
2012	Tippeligaen	↓ 15	30	9	3	18	42	59	30	Second round	Relegated to the 1. divisjon
2013	1. divisjon	10	30	11	8	11	44	41	41	Third round	
2014	1. divisjon	6	30	14	6	10	35	26	48	Second round	
2015	1. divisjon	12	30	8	11	11	41	61	35	Second round	Escaped relegation in the 6th minute of added time
2016	1. divisjon	11	30	8	9	13	34	48	33	Third round	
2017	1. divisjon	↓ 14	30	5	11	14	33	51	26	First round	Relegated to 2. divisjon
2018	2. divisjon	2	26	15	7	4	53	25	52	Second round	
2019	2. divisjon	3	26	16	5	5	52	28	53	Second round	
2020	2. divisjon	↑ 1	19	17	1	1	60	19	52	Cancelled	Promoted to 1. divisjon
2021	1. divisjon	4	30	15	7	8	60	42	52	Second round	
2022	1. divisjon	10	30	9	8	13	46	51	35	Third round	
2023	1. divisjon	↑ 1	30	18	10	2	50	23	64	Third round	Promoted to Eliteserien
2024	Eliteserien	6	30	14	9	7	39	35	51	Winner	
2025	Eliteserien	8	30	11	9	10	38	35	42	Fourth round	
2026 (in progress)	Eliteserien	11	25	8	5	12	29	44	29	Quarterfinal	

== Players ==
=== First team squad ===
As of 3 September 2026

Note: Flags indicate national team as defined under FIFA eligibility rules; some limited exceptions apply. Players may hold more than one non-FIFA nationality.

No.	Pos.	Nation	Player
2	DF	SWE	Kennedy Okpaleke
4	DF	NOR	Fredrik Holmé
5	DF	NOR	Simen Rafn (team captain)
6	MF	SWE	Samuel Leach Holm
7	FW	NOR	Benjamin Faraas
9	MF	MAR	Salim Laghzaoui
10	FW	NOR	Johannes Nuñez
11	FW	NOR	Liam West
12	DF	NOR	Ulrik Fredriksen
13	MF	NOR	Sondre Sørløkk
14	MF	SWE	Max Nilsson
16	DF	NOR	Daniel Eid
17	DF	NOR	Sigurd Kvile

No.	Pos.	Nation	Player
18	FW	NOR	Bryan Fiabema
19	DF	NOR	Fanuel Ghebreyohannes
21	MF	POL	Jakub Jezierski (on loan from Sigma Olomouc)
23	FW	NOR	Henrik Skogvold
24	MF	GHA	Leonard Owusu (on loan from Partizan)
25	GK	NOR	Ole Langbråten
26	DF	NOR	Joachim Nysveen
27	DF	CMR	Chris Pondy
28	DF	NOR	Solomon Owusu
29	MF	USA	Gabriel Wesseh
30	GK	NOR	Jasper Silva Torkildsen
38	DF	NOR	Isak Amundsen
77	GK	NOR	Martin Børsheim

=== Retired numbers ===
8 – (Norway) Dagfinn Enerly, Winger (2004–05)

== Coaching staff ==
As of 20 May 2026

Head coach	Casper Røjkjær
Assistant coach	Kevin Nicol
Goalkeeping coach	Samuel Dirscher
Fitness coach	Torvald Berthelsen
Player developer	Stian Johnsen
Physio	Håkon Wæhler
Medical apparatus	Jørn Pedersen

== Coaches ==
- (Norway) Walther Røed (1950–1951)
- (Austria) Franz Köhler (1952)
- (Norway) Gunnar Andreassen (1953–1956)
- (Norway) Erik Holmberg (1957–1959)
- (Austria) Ferdinand Schäffer (1961–1962)
- (Norway) Erik Holmberg (1963)
- (Norway) Gunnar Andreassen (1963)
- (Norway) Reidar Olsen (1963)
- (Norway) Odd Aas (1963)
- (England) Frank Soo (1964)
- (Norway) Erik Holmberg (1965)
- (Norway) Bjørn Spydevold (1966–1967)
- (Norway) Brede Borgen (1968)
- (Norway) Per Mosgaard (1969)
- (Norway) Odd Aas (1970)
- (Norway) Arne Pedersen (1971–1973)
- (Norway) Per Henæs (1974–1975)
- (Austria) Wilhelm Kment (1976)
- (Norway) Roar Johansen (1977)
- (Norway) Per Mosgaard (1978–1979)
- (Netherlands) Huib Ruijgrok (1980)
- (Norway) Knut-Erik Rikheim (1980–1981)
- (England) Tony Knapp (1982–1983)
- (Norway) Jan Aas (1984)
- (Norway) Per Mosgaard (1984–1985)
- (Sweden) Reine Almqvist (1986–1988)
- (Norway) Øyvind Nilsen (1989–1992)
- (Norway) Frode Holstad Hansen (1993)
- (Sweden) Lars-Olof Mattsson (1994–1995)
- (Norway) Alf Gustavsen (1996–1997)
- (Norway) Bjarne Rønning (1998–1999)
- (Sweden) Håkan Sandberg (2000)
- (Norway) Johnny Jonassen (2000)
- (Norway) Glenn Rostad (2001)
- (Norway) Knut Torbjørn Eggen (2002–2004)
- (Norway) Egil Olsen (2005)
- (Norway) Knut Torbjørn Eggen (2006)
- (Sweden) Anders Grönhagen (2007–2009)
- (Norway) Tom Nordlie (2009–2010)
- (Norway) Tom Freddy Aune (2010–2012)
- (Norway) Trond Amundsen (2012)
- (Norway) Lars Bakkerud (2013)
- (Norway) Håkon Wibe-Lund (2013–2015)
- (Norway) Jan Tore Ophaug & Aleksander Olsen (interim) (2015)
- (Norway) Arne Erlandsen (2015)
- (Norway) Jan Halvor Halvorsen (2015–2016)
- (Norway) Mons Ivar Mjelde (2016)
- (Italy) Andrea Loberto (2016–2017)
- (Norway) Per-Mathias Høgmo (2017–2018)
- (Norway) Bjørn Johansen (2019–2022)
- (Faroe Islands) Mikkjal Thomassen (2022–2024)
- (Norway) Andreas Hagen (2024–2026)
- (Denmark) Casper Røjkjær (2026–)

== European record ==
Season	Competition	Round	Club	Home	Away	Agg.
1960–61	European Cup	PR	(Netherlands) Ajax	4–3	0–0	4–3
1960–61	European Cup	1R	(Denmark) AGF	0–1	0–3	0–4
1961–62	European Cup	PR	(Belgium) Standard Liège	0–2	1–2	1–4
1962–63	European Cup	PR	(Hungary) Vasas	1–4	0–7	1–11
1967–68	UEFA Cup Winners' Cup	1R	(Portugal) Vitória de Setúbal	1–5	1–2	2–7
1972–73	UEFA Cup Winners' Cup	1R	(Socialist Federal Republic of Yugoslavia) Hajduk Split	0–1	0–1	0–2
1973–74	UEFA Cup	1R	(Soviet Union) Dynamo Kiev	0–1	0–4	0–5
1985–86	UEFA Cup Winners' Cup	1R	(Wales) Bangor City	1–1	0–0	1–1 (a)
2007–08	UEFA Cup	2QR	(Sweden) Hammarby	1–1	1–2	2–3
2009–10	UEFA Europa League	3QR	(Poland) Lech Poznań	1–6	2–1	3–7
2025–26	UEFA Europa League	3QR	(Denmark) Midtjylland	1–3	0–2	1–5
2025–26	UEFA Conference League	PO	(England) Crystal Palace	0–0	0–1	0–1

Notes

- PR: Preliminary round
- 1R: First round
- 2QR: Second qualifying round
- 3QR: Third qualifying round
- PO: Play-off round

== Bibliography ==
- Simensen, Jens Olav (2005). Godfotarven: Knut Torbjørn Eggen i samhandling med Nils A. Aschehoug. ISBN 82-03-23225-6.
