= 2024 Sogndal Fotball season =

Sogndal
2024 season
- Chairman: Tor Arne Ness
- Head coach: Tore André Flo (until 30 September)
- Stadium: Fosshaugane Campus
- 1. divisjon: 13th
- Norwegian Cup: Third round
- Top goalscorer: League: Edmund Baidoo (7); All: Edmund Baidoo (9)
Home colours	Away colours

The 2024 season is Sogndal Fotball's 98th season in its history and the seventh consecutive season in the Norwegian second tier. In addition to the domestic league, the team will participate in the Norwegian Football Cup.

== Players ==
=== First-team squad ===
As of 18 September 2023

Note: Flags indicate national team as defined under FIFA eligibility rules; some limited exceptions apply. Players may hold more than one non-FIFA nationality.

No.	Pos.	Nation	Player
1	GK	NOR	Lars Jendal
2	DF	SWE	Felix Eriksson (on loan from IFK Göteborg)
4	DF	DEN	Daniel Arrocha
6	MF	NOR	Martin Høyland
7	MF	GHA	Edmund Baidoo
8	MF	NOR	Jacob Blixt Flaten
9	FW	SWE	Oliver Hintsa
10	MF	NOR	Kasper Skaanes
11	FW	NOR	Andreas Hoven
13	DF	NOR	Per-Egil Flo
15	MF	NOR	Kristoffer Haukås Steinset

No.	Pos.	Nation	Player
16	DF	NGR	Emmanuel Oluwafemi Olugbe
17	MF	NOR	Martin Sjølstad
20	MF	GHA	Isaac Twum
21	GK	NOR	Magnus Stær-Jensen (on loan from Vålerenga)
29	MF	NOR	Kristoffer Haukås Steinset
30	MF	NOR	Erik Hovden Flataker
31	FW	NOR	Joakim Berg Nundal
32	DF	NOR	Mathias Øren
35	GK	NOR	Daniel Gjerde Sætren
77	MF	ISL	Óskar Borgþórsson

=== Out on loan ===
Note: Flags indicate national team as defined under FIFA eligibility rules; some limited exceptions apply. Players may hold more than one non-FIFA nationality.

No.	Pos.	Nation	Player
99	FW	MEX	Alejandro Díaz (at Vancouver FC)

== Transfers ==
=== In ===
Pos.	Player	Transferred from	Fee	Date	Source
DF	(Sweden) Felix Eriksson	(Sweden) IFK Göteborg		25 January 2024	
FW	(Ghana) Edmund Baidoo	(Ghana) Asanska Football Club		21 February 2024	

=== Out ===
Pos.	Player	Transferred to	Fee	Date	Source
MF	(Iceland) Valdimar Þór Ingimundarson	(Iceland) Víkingur Reykjavík	Undisclosed	2 February 2024	
MF	(Norway) Mansour Gueye	(Norway) Jerv	Free	19 February 2024	
DF	(Norway) Andreas van der Spa	(Norway) Sandefjord	Undisclosed	27 February 2024	

== Pre-season and friendlies ==
Win Draw Loss Fixtures

20 January 2024 Friendly	Sogndal (Norway)	1–0	(Norway) Førde	Sogndalsfjøra
15:00				Stadium: Sognahallen

27 January 2024 Friendly	Sogndal (Norway)	2–2	(Norway) Bjarg	Sogndalsfjøra
12:00				Stadium: Sognahallen

8 February 2024 Friendly	Sogndal (Norway)	2–1	(Spain) Real Murcia	Orihuela Costa, Spain
12:00				Stadium: Real Club de Golf Campoamor Campo 1

15 February 2024 Friendly	Sogndal (Norway)	1–2	(Ukraine) Metalist 1925 Kharkiv	Orihuela, Spain
12:00				Stadium: Nuevo Campo del Campoamor Golf Resort

23 February 2024 Friendly	Sogndal (Norway)	2–3	(Norway) Aalesund	Sogndalsfjøra
				Stadium: Fosshaugane Campus

28 February 2024 Friendly	Sogndal (Norway)	3–0	(Norway) Florø	Sogndalsfjøra
18:00				Stadium: Fosshaugane Campus

2 March 2024 Friendly	Sogndal (Norway)	0–0	(Norway) Åsane	Sogndalsfjøra
15:00				Stadium: Fosshaugane Campus

9 March 2024 Friendly	Hødd (Norway)	2–0	(Norway) Sogndal	Ulsteinvik
14:00				Stadium: Høddvoll Stadion

16 March 2024 Friendly	Raufoss (Norway)	1–5	(Norway) Sogndal	Leira
14:00				Stadium: Valdres Storhall

25 March 2024 Friendly	Sogndal (Norway)	1–2	(Norway) Brann	Sogndalsfjøra
14:00				Stadium: Fosshaugane Campus

== Competitions ==
=== Overall record ===
Competition	First match	Last match	Starting round	Final position	Record							
Competition	First match	Last match	Starting round	Final position	Pld	W	D	L	GF	GA	GD	Win %
1. divisjon	1 April 2024	9 November 2024	Matchday 1	13th	30	9	7	14	34	40	−6	30.00
Norwegian Cup	10 April 2024	1 May 2024	First round	Third round	3	1	2	0	9	5	+4	33.33
Total					33	10	9	14	43	45	−2	30.30

Source: Soccerway

=== Norwegian First Division ===
==== League table ====
Pos	Team	Pld	W	D	L	GF	GA	GD	Pts	Promotion, qualification or relegation
11	Åsane	30	10	7	13	46	52	−6	37	
12	Start	30	9	8	13	45	57	−12	35	
13	Sogndal	30	9	7	14	34	40	−6	34	
14	Mjøndalen (Note: Mjøndalen were deducted 1 point.) (O)	30	8	8	14	38	50	−12	31	Qualification for the relegation play-offs
15	Levanger (R)	30	6	11	13	47	51	−4	29	Relegation to Second Division

Source: OBOS-ligaen (in Norwegian)
Rules for classification: 1) Points; 2) Goal difference; 3) Goals scored; 4) Head-to-head points; 5) Head-to-head goal difference; 6) Head-to-head goals scored.
(O) Play-off winners; (R) Relegated

==== Results summary ====
Overall								Home						Away					
Pld	W	D	L	GF	GA	GD	Pts	W	D	L	GF	GA	GD	W	D	L	GF	GA	GD
30	9	7	14	34	40	−6	34	5	3	7	23	21	+2	4	4	7	11	19	−8

Source: Worldfootball

==== Results by round ====
Round	1	2	3	4	5	6	7	8	9	10	11	12
Ground	A	H	A	H	A	A	H	A	H	A	H	
Result	D	W	D	W	L	D	W	W	D	L	L	
Position	7	2	4	1	6	5	3	1	2	6	6	

Updated to match(es) played on 1 June 2024. Source: Worldfootball
A = Away; H = Home; W = Win; D = Draw; L = Loss

==== Matches ====
The full schedule were released on 20 December 2023.

1 April 2024 1	Vålerenga	1–1	Sogndal	Oslo
17:00 CEST (UTC+2)	Håkans 69'; Kreuzriegler (yellow card) 71'	Report	Flataker 37'; Flo (yellow card) 49'	Stadium: Intility Arena; Attendance: 9,164; Referee: Mischa Huru Kellerhals

6 April 2024 2	Sogndal	3–1	Mjøndalen	Sogndalsfjøra
16:00 CEST (UTC+2)	Arrocha 37' (pen.), 40' (pen.); Baidoo 65'; Eriksson (yellow card) 73'	Report	Appiah (yellow card) 19'; Holten 28'; Rønning Ovenstad (yellow card) 36'; Holten (yellow card) 39'	Stadium: Fosshaugane Campus; Attendance: 2,241; Referee: Anders Bodding

15 April 2024 3	Åsane	1–1	Sogndal	Bergen
19:00 CEST (UTC+2)	Ueland (yellow card) 42'; Iversen (yellow card) 63'; Bruun-Hanssen 86'	Report	Baidoo 34' (yellow card) 37'; Høyland (yellow card) 77'; Jendal (yellow card) 80'	Stadium: Åsane Arena; Attendance: 894; Referee: Stian Røvig Sletner

20 April 2024 4	Sogndal	1–0	Moss	Sogndalsfjøra
16:00 CEST (UTC+2)	Høyland (yellow card) 52'; Eriksson 71'	Report	Andresen (yellow card) 82'	Stadium: Fosshaugane Campus; Attendance: 1,797; Referee: Ali al Hatam

27 April 2024 5	Bryne	1–0	Sogndal	Bryne
16:00 CEST (UTC+2)	Landu-landu 1'; Görlich (yellow card) 44'; Undheim (yellow card) 56'	Report	Blixt Flaten (yellow card) 38'; Hinsta (yellow card) 65'; Øren (yellow card) 87'; Eriksson (yellow card) 90+5'	Stadium: Bryne Stadion; Attendance: 1,141; Referee: Jan Morten Tennøy

4 May 2024 6	Levanger	0–0	Sogndal	Levanger
16:00 CEST (UTC+2)	Saugestad (yellow card) 53'	Report	Sjølstad (yellow card) 45'	Stadium: TOBB Arena Levanger; Attendance: 1,303; Referee: Mohammad Hafezi

11 May 2024 7	Sogndal	5–1	Sandnes Ulf	Sogndalsfjøra
16:00 CEST (UTC+2)	Flataker 7', 44'; Øren 25'; Baidoo 31'; Hinsta 77'	Report	Jensen (yellow card) 66'; Memedov 76'	Stadium: Fosshaugane Campus; Attendance: 1,716; Referee: Magnus Nicolai Koløy

16 May 2024 8	Aalesund	0–2	Sogndal	Ålesund
16:00 CEST (UTC+2)	Ramsland (yellow card) 36'; Hammer (yellow card) 45'; Grøgaard (yellow card) 45'	Report	Høyland 33'; Arrocha 37' (pen.)	Stadium: Color Line Stadion; Attendance: 4,557; Referee: Johan William Grundt

22 May 2024 9	Sogndal	1–1	Raufoss	Sogndalsfjøra
19:00 CEST (UTC+2)	Ørsahl 16' (o.g.)	Report	Hansen (yellow card) 37'; Engebakken (yellow card) 46'; Hay 68'; Emsis (yellow card) 84'	Stadium: Fosshaugane Campus; Attendance: 1,667; Referee: Eivind Bodding

28 May 2024 10	Start	2–1	Sogndal	Kristiansand
19:00 CEST (UTC+2)	Strannegård 47'; Schulze 90+7'	Report	Sjølstad (yellow card) 7'; Baidoo 26'	Stadium: Sør Arena; Attendance: 2,092; Referee: Harald Vollstad Sletner

1 June 2024 11	Sogndal	2–3	Stabæk	Sogndalsfjøra
16:00 CEST (UTC+2)	Hintsa 1'; Flaten (yellow card) 45+1'; Arrocha (yellow card) 61'; Høyland 73'	Report	Spiten-Nysæter 14', 33'; Walstad (yellow card) 79'; Roberts 83'; Rossbach (yellow card) 90+5'	Stadium: Fosshaugane Campus; Attendance: 1,951; Referee: Ole-Alexander Ekeli Valen

9 June 2024 12	Sogndal	v	Egersund	Sogndalsfjøra
17:00 CEST (UTC+2)		Report		Stadium: Fosshaugane Campus

=== Norwegian Football Cup ===
10 April 2024 First round	Førde	2–6	Sogndal	Førde
17:30 CEST (UTC+2)	Nistad 1' (yellow card) 90+1'; Gjøringbø (yellow card) 29'; Trollebo 47'; Rognebakke (yellow card) 60'; Hallstensen (yellow card) 62'	Report	Nundal 6'; Hintsa (yellow card) 23' (goal) 41'; Arrocha 30'; Baidoo 34', 38'; Eriksson 49'; Årøy (yellow card) 70'; Hoven (yellow card) 74'; Stavø (yellow card) 83'	Stadium: Førde Stadion; Attendance: 604; Referee: Jakob Sande Søgnen

24 April 2024 Second round	Frøya	2–2 (a.e.t.) (5–6 p)	Sogndal	Bergen
18:00 CEST (UTC+2)	Skutle 45+2'; Vindenes 87'; Nes (red card) 89'; Vainikaitis (red card) 95'; Helland (yellow card) 114'	Report	Arrocha 35'; Høyland 71'; Hoven (yellow card) 78'	Stadium: Frøya Idrettspark; Attendance: 447; Referee: Markus Lille
	Penalties
	Vetås (penalty scored); Vindenes (penalty scored); Byrkjeland (penalty scored); Rojas (penalty scored); Helland (penalty missed); Hodnefjell (penalty scored); Stjernberg (penalty missed)		(penalty scored) Flo; (penalty missed) Hoven; (penalty scored) Eriksson; (penalty scored) Nundal; (penalty scored) Sjølstad; (penalty scored) Twum; (penalty scored) Øren

1 May 2024 Third round	Sogndal	1–1 (a.e.t.) (4–5 p)	KFUM Oslo	Sogndalsfjøra
14:30 CEST (UTC+2)	Høyland (yellow card) 64'; Stavø 72'	Report	Rasch 89'; Harrison (yellow card) 99'	Stadium: Fosshaugane Campus; Attendance: 1,706; Referee: Steinar Hauge
	Penalties
	Arrocha (penalty scored); Flo (penalty scored); Høyland (penalty missed); Stavø (penalty scored); Hoven (penalty scored)		(penalty scored) Rasch; (penalty scored) Hestnes; (penalty scored) Nosa Dahl; (penalty scored) Hadzic; (penalty scored) Nuñez
