= 2024 Norwegian Football Cup =

Tournament details
- Country: Norway
- Dates: 9 April – 7 December 2024
- Teams: 128 (competition proper)

Final positions
- Champions: Fredrikstad
- Runners-up: Molde

Tournament statistics
- Matches played: 127
- Goals scored: 579 (4.56 per match)
- Top goal scorer(s): Tobias Hestad (8 goals)

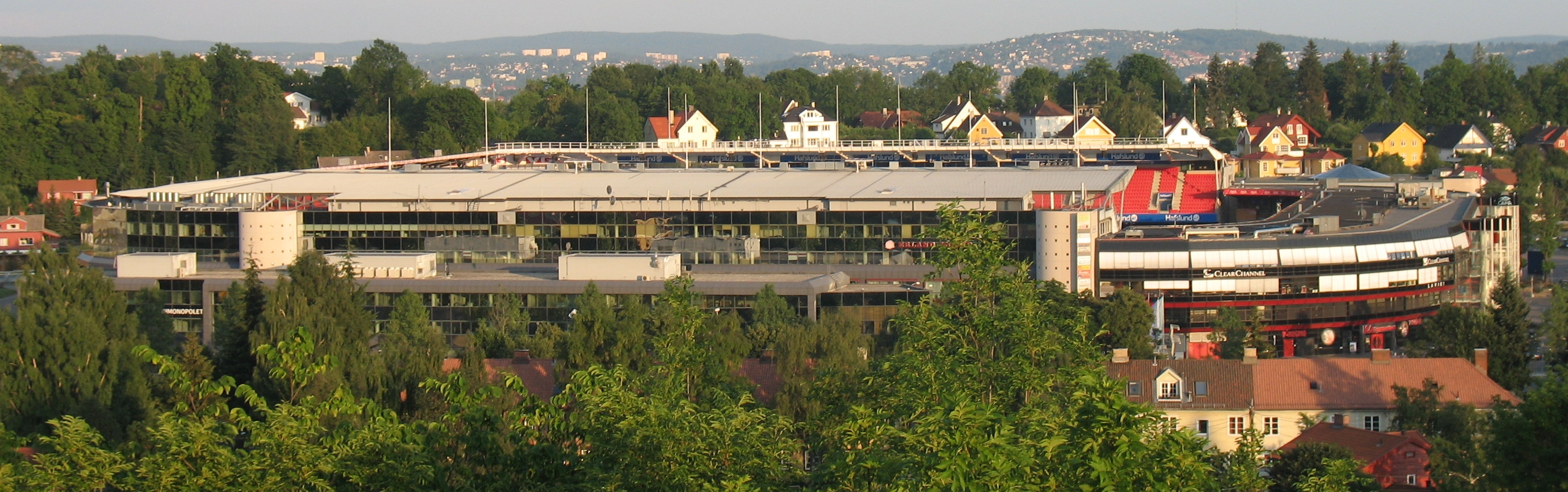
Ullevaal Stadion, Oslo - venue for the Norwegian Cup final

The 2024 Norwegian Football Cup was the 118th season of the Norwegian annual knock-out football tournament. It started on 9 April 2024. The final was played on 7 December 2024. The winners qualified for the 2025–26 Europa League third qualifying round.

== Calendar ==
Below are the dates for each round as given by the official schedule:

Round	Main date	Number of fixtures	Clubs
First round	10 April 2024	64	128 → 64
Second round	24 April 2024	32	64 → 32
Third round	1 May 2024	16	32 → 16
Fourth round	8 May 2024	8	16 → 8
Quarter-finals	6 October 2024	4	8 → 4
Semi-finals	30 October 2024	2	4 → 2
Final	7 December 2024	1	2 → 1

== First round ==
The pair-ups for the first round were announced on 26 March 2024.

Number of teams per tier entering this round
Eliteserien (1)	1. divisjon (2)	2. divisjon (3)	3. divisjon (4)	4. divisjon (5)	Total
16 / 16	16 / 16	25 / 28	44 / 84	27 / 254	128 / 398

9 April 2024	Brønnøysund (5)	0–6	(1) Bodø/Glimt	Brønnøysund
18:00 CEST (UTC+2)		Report	Sørli 6', 23', 26'; Kapskarmo 11'; Saltnes 29'; Wembangomo 70'	Stadium: Brønnøysund Kunstgress; Attendance: 2,300; Referee: Oliver Skaret Barsøe

10 April 2024	Kirkenes (5)	0–11	(3) Alta	Kirkenes
17:00 CEST (UTC+2)		Report	Hestad 2', 28', 34', 45+1', 48', 58', 80'; Norbye 23'; J. Andersen 52'; Lamark 62'; Opgard 77'	Stadium: Kirkenes stadion Referee: Magnus Henriksen Tjelle

10 April 2024	Union Carl Berner (5)	0–3	(2) Vålerenga	Oslo
17:00 CEST (UTC+2)		Report	Rijks 51'; Riisnæs 68', 82'	Stadium: Jordal Idrettspark; Referee: Stian Røvig Sletner

10 April 2024	Førde (4)	2–6	(2) Sogndal	Førde
17:30 CEST (UTC+2)	Nistad 1'; Trollebo 47'	Report	Nundal 6'; Arrocha 30'; Baidoo 34', 38'; Hintsa 41'; Eriksson 49'	Stadium: Førde Stadion; Attendance: 604; Referee: Jakob Sande Søgnen

10 April 2024	Bossekop (5)	1–3	(4) Skjervøy	Alta
18:00 CEST (UTC+2)	Hammari 12'	Report	Skalebo 12'; Christensen 13'; Pedersen 22'	Stadium: Coop Arena Kunstgress; Referee: Aleksandar Spasic

10 April 2024	Senja (5)	1–6	(3) Tromsdalen	Silsand
18:00 CEST (UTC+2)	Berglund 80'	Report	Egerton 36'; Eliassen 40'; Celius 45', 49', 56'; Ottesen 48'	Stadium: Senja Stadion; Attendance: 154; Referee: Egil Bertheussen

10 April 2024	Sortland (5)	0–6	(1) Tromsø	Sortland
18:00 CEST (UTC+2)		Report	Erlien 2' (pen.), 74' (pen.); Nordås 38', 39', 59'; Romsaas 54'	Stadium: Blåbyhallen; Attendance: 1,752; Referee: Michael Wikestad Pedersen

10 April 2024	Mjølner (4)	1–2	(4) Fløya	Narvik
18:00 CEST (UTC+2)	Nicolaisen 2'	Report	Bendiksen 18'; Mørkved 89'	Stadium: Narvik Stadion; Referee: Øyvind Jøstensen

10 April 2024	Rana (4)	0–3	(3) Junkeren	Mo i Rana
18:00 CEST (UTC+2)		Report	Svela 40', 65'; Chooly 45+3'	Stadium: Sagbakken Stadion; Referee: Gustav Havig

10 April 2024	Mosjøen (4)	0–4	(2) Levanger	Mosjøen
18:00 CEST (UTC+2)		Report	G. Andersen 28'; Stakset 40', 48'; Jonas 68'	Stadium: Kippermoen; Referee: Martin Berg

10 April 2024	Sverresborg (5)	0–6	(1) Rosenborg	Trondheim
18:00 CEST (UTC+2)		Report	Broholm 9', 86'; Sadiku 22' (pen.), 71', 88'; Nelson 25'	Stadium: Havsteinbanen; Referee: Mathias Støfringshaug

10 April 2024	Nardo (4)	2–4	(3) Strindheim	Trondheim
18:00 CEST (UTC+2)	Stokke 12'; Holm 76'	Report	Hammerås 6', 53'; Kosberg 45+2'; Lund 90+6'	Stadium: Nissekollen; Attendance: 98; Referee: Mats Thorsø Hansen

10 April 2024	Tiller (4)	0–3	(2) Ranheim	Trondheim
18:00 CEST (UTC+2)		Report	Gaustad 54'; Johnsen 69' (pen.); Wenaas 76'	Stadium: Tonstad kunstgress Attendance: 150; Referee: Per Oscar Grov Heiberg

10 April 2024	Trygg/Lade (4)	2–3	(3) Stjørdals-Blink	Trondheim
18:00 CEST (UTC+2)	Juliebø 20'; Bruseth 30'	Report	Haukeberg 5'; Horgøien 32'; Lillebo 39'	Stadium: Obosbanen; Attendance: 70; Referee: Robert Eggen

10 April 2024	Melhus (4)	1–0	(4) Byåsen	Melhus
18:00 CEST (UTC+2)	Eid 39'	Report		Stadium: Gruva; Referee: Preben Øien

10 April 2024	Træff (4)	5–1	(4) Surnadal	Molde
18:00 CEST (UTC+2)	Selmer 5', 76'; Okanovic 44', 62'; Tornes 48'	Report	Næss 16'	Stadium: Reknesbanen; Referee: Kristoffer Nevstad

10 April 2024	Eide/Omegn (5)	0–5	(1) Molde	Eide
18:00 CEST (UTC+2)		Report	Olanare 61'; Nyheim 65'; Granaas 75'; Juberg-Hovland 87'; Breivik 90+1'	Stadium: Eide Kunstgressbane; Referee: Mathias Kringstad

10 April 2024	Brattvåg (3)	1–2	(1) Kristiansund	Brattvåg
18:00 CEST (UTC+2)	Sundgot 61'	Report	Williamsen 7'; Guèye 35'	Stadium: Brattvåg gras Referee: Bendik Haarberg

10 April 2024	Spjelkavik (4)	0–2	(2) Aalesund	Ålesund
18:00 CEST (UTC+2)		Report	Kilen 20'; Braga 72'	Stadium: Spjelkavik kunstgress Attendance: 415; Referee: Even Myrheim

10 April 2024	Fjøra (5)	2–5	(2) Åsane	Sogndalsfjøra
18:00 CEST (UTC+2)	Olsen 45+1'; Ardal 57'	Report	Bangoura 23'; Myklebust 25' (pen.), 33', 76' (pen.); Strand 78'	Stadium: Fosshaugane Campus; Attendance: 303; Referee: Sivert Orheim

10 April 2024	Os (4)	0–2	(4) Frøya	Os
18:00 CEST (UTC+2)		Report	Vindenes 16'; Jørgensen 43'	Stadium: Kuventræ Stadion; Attendance: 300; Referee: Steinar Hauge

10 April 2024	Fana (4)	0–2	(3) Lysekloster	Bergen
18:00 CEST (UTC+2)		Report	H. Andersen 59'; Habestad 74'	Stadium: Nesttun idrettsplass Attendance: 276; Referee: Markus Lille

10 April 2024	Sandviken (4)	4–6 (a.e.t.)	(4) Bjarg	Bergen
18:00 CEST (UTC+2)	Haugland 11'; Skåre 45+2'; Andreassen 90+1', 118'	Report	Hopsdal 7', 74'; Eiane 72'; Dahl 102' (pen.); Jørgensen 111'; Kallmyr 120+1'	Stadium: Stemmemyren idrettsplass Referee: Sivert Amland

10 April 2024	Stord (4)	4–4 (a.e.t.) (3–2 p)	(4) Djerv 1919	Stord
18:00 CEST (UTC+2)	Grov 25'; Stoknes 34'; Handeland 77'; Grangård 116'	Report; Penalties	Øverbø 14', 31'; Vik 60'; Pedersen 97'	Stadium: Stord Stadion; Referee: Freek Arjen van Herk
	Penalties
	Ekelnad (penalty scored); Grov (penalty missed); Johnsen (penalty scored); Zhdanov (penalty missed); Grangård (penalty scored)		(penalty scored) Pedersen; (penalty scored) E. V. Andersen; (penalty missed) Horneland; (penalty missed) Rullestad; (penalty missed) Ndayisenga

10 April 2024	Torvastad (5)	1–1 (a.e.t.) (2–0 p)	(1) Haugesund	Torvastad
18:00 CEST (UTC+2)	Lippestad 52'	Report; Penalties	Seo 66'	Stadium: Torvastad idrettssenter Referee: Sondre Brudvik
	Penalties
	Jacobsen (penalty scored); Sætre (penalty missed); Miljeteig (penalty scored); Apeland (penalty missed)		(penalty missed) Tounekti; (penalty missed) Traoré; (penalty missed) Karlsson; (penalty missed) Krusnnell

10 April 2024	Madla (4)	3–5	(3) Vard Haugesund	Stavanger
18:00 CEST (UTC+2)	Jonassen 9' (o.g.); Karimirouzbehani 76'; Erland 87'	Report	Torgensen 28' (o.g.); Harvey 52'; Dobosz 58'; Dvergsdal 90'; Olufsen 90+7'	Stadium: Madla Handelslag Stadion; Referee: Are Gabriel Høyland

10 April 2024	Varhaug (5)	0–5	(1) Viking	Varhaug
18:00 CEST (UTC+2)		Report	Paulsen 7'; D'Agostino 12'; de Lanlay 50'; Løkberg 53'; Christiansen 55'	Stadium: Varhaug Stadion; Attendance: 1,602; Referee: Amir Ajjour

10 April 2024	Brodd (4)	1–3	(2) Sandnes Ulf	Stavanger
18:00 CEST (UTC+2)	Emanuelsen 28'	Report	Høiland 24' (pen.), 53', 89'	Stadium: Midjord idrettspark Attendance: 831; Referee: Sander Ringøy Moen

10 April 2024	Vidar (4)	0–1	(2) Egersund	Stavanger
18:00 CEST (UTC+2)		Report	Helmersen 57'	Stadium: Lassa Idrettspark; Attendance: 125; Referee: Mischa Kellerhals

10 April 2024	Randesund (5)	0–2	(3) Jerv	Kristiansand
18:00 CEST (UTC+2)		Report	Furaha 42'; Endresen 72'	Stadium: Sukkevann idrettspark Referee: Hussein Al-Kharasani

10 April 2024	Mandalskameratene (4)	1–1 (a.e.t.) (6–5 p)	(2) Start	Mandal
18:00 CEST (UTC+2)	Culibrk 38'	Report; Penalties	Schulze 62'	Stadium: Idrettsparken; Referee: Svein Tore Sinnes
	Penalties
	Beyene (penalty missed); Valand (penalty scored); Vinsjevik (penalty scored); Brandser (penalty scored); Culibrk (penalty scored); Prelevic (penalty scored); Soteland (penalty scored)		(penalty scored) Schulze; (penalty scored) Sjøkvist; (penalty scored) Grundetjern; (penalty scored) Ćosić; (penalty missed) Seim; (penalty scored) Ness; (penalty missed) Nkubiri

10 April 2024	Fløy (3)	1–0	(1) Sandefjord	Flekkerøy
18:00 CEST (UTC+2)	Osestad 64'	Report		Stadium: Cemo Arena; Attendance: 512; Referee: Jørgen Haga

10 April 2024	Hei (5)	0–1	(4) Pors	Heistad
18:00 CEST (UTC+2)		Report	Ugwuadu 56'	Stadium: Mortens Plass KG; Attendance: 2,000; Referee: Marius Tvede Hansen

10 April 2024	Fram (4)	2–1	(3) Notodden	Larvik
18:00 CEST (UTC+2)	Pettersen 12'; Nilsen 79'	Report	Bratvold 10'	Stadium: Framparken; Attendance: 563; Referee: Pavel Breivik

10 April 2024	Ørn Horten (3)	0–3	(2) Mjøndalen	Horten
18:00 CEST (UTC+2)		Report	Bringaker 21'; Singh 40'; Tokstad 90'	Stadium: Lystlunden; Attendance: 342; Referee: Marius Lien

10 April 2024	Åskollen (4)	1–3	(1) Odd	Drammen
18:00 CEST (UTC+2)	Johanesen 52'	Report	Ingebrigtsen 9', 49' (pen.); Skau 42'	Stadium: Gulskogen Arena; Referee: Herman Holthe

10 April 2024	Ridabu (5)	0–5	(1) HamKam	Ridabu
18:00 CEST (UTC+2)		Report	Udahl 27' (pen.); Jónsson 35'; Norheim 57'; Ødegård 58'; Simenstad 72'	Stadium: Black River Park kunstgress Attendance: 1,462; Referee: Haakon Arve Pedersen Bue

10 April 2024	Nybergsund (5)	0–8	(2) Kongsvinger	Nybergsund
18:00 CEST (UTC+2)		Report	Christiansen 37'; Grundt 40'; Stakset 50'; Sandstad 58', 60'; Eriksen 65'; Damhaug 76'; Breum 88' (o.g.)	Stadium: Nybergsund Stadion; Attendance: 220; Referee: Mohammad Hafezi

10 April 2024	Hønefoss (4)	5–0	(3) Gjøvik-Lyn	Hønefoss
18:00 CEST (UTC+2)	Groven 3'; Svensson 32'; Nestaker 38', 89'; Pedersen 40'	Report		Stadium: Aka Arena; Attendance: 581; Referee: Håvard Bjerkelund

10 April 2024	Bjørkelangen (4)	0–7	(1) Lillestrøm	Bjørkelangen
18:00 CEST (UTC+2)		Report	Furaha 19', 65'; Skaarud 32' (pen.), 69'; Foss 42'; Seferi 55'; Lucky 59'	Stadium: Bjørkelangen kunstgress Attendance: 2,200; Referee: Eivind Bodding

10 April 2024	Gjelleråsen (4)	2–4	(3) Strømmen	Gjelleråsen
18:00 CEST (UTC+2)	Coric 59'; Njøten 62'	Report	Solberg 45+4'; Sundberg 70' (pen.), 81', 90+5' (pen.)	Stadium: Gjelleråsen kunstgress Referee: Markus Rotvold Hammarstrøm

10 April 2024	Lørenskog (4)	1–2	(3) Ull/Kisa	Lørenskog
18:00 CEST (UTC+2)	Martin 52'	Report	Svenningsen 30'; Paulsen 89'	Stadium: Rolvsrud stadion Attendance: 75; Referee: Jørgen Haugen

10 April 2024	Årvoll (5)	0–2	(1) KFUM Oslo	Oslo
18:00 CEST (UTC+2)	Nuñez 35'; Haltvik 60'	Report		Stadium: Årvoll kunstgress Referee: Ajdin Medic

10 April 2024	Heming (5)	0–2	(2) Lyn	Oslo
18:00 CEST (UTC+2)		Report	Ingebrigtsen 16'; Berntsen 30'	Stadium: Hemingbanen; Referee: Ola Kellerhals

10 April 2024	Frigg (4)	3–1 (a.e.t.)	(3) Grorud	Oslo
18:00 CEST (UTC+2)	Risberg 101'; Barane 105', 108'	Report	Cassidy 92' (o.g.)	Stadium: Tørteberg kunstgress Attendance: 145; Referee: Eirik Wisted-Thu

10 April 2024	Nordstrand (4)	0–1	(3) Kjelsås	Oslo
18:00 CEST (UTC+2)		Report	Vestby 45' (o.g.)	Stadium: Nordstrand kunstgress Referee: Himmet Boyar

10 April 2024	Oppsal (4)	3–1 (a.e.t.)	(3) Follo	Oslo
18:00 CEST (UTC+2)	Lamin 59'; Bråten 93'; Helgesson 112'	Report	Hennig 90'	Stadium: Trasop idrettspark Referee: Jonas Weiberg Sture

10 April 2024	Drøbak-Frogn (5)	0–10	(1) Fredrikstad	Drøbak
18:00 CEST (UTC+2)		Report	Johansen 18'; Begby 30'; Hendriksson 42' (pen.); Segberg 43'; Kjær 59'; Bjørlo 63', 90+1'; Aga 65'; Solberg 71'; Skaret 83'	Stadium: Seiersten stadion Referee: Arion Shaqiri

10 April 2024	Sarpsborg FK (5)	1–5	(1) Sarpsborg 08	Sarpsborg
18:00 CEST (UTC+2)	Rahhaoui 4'	Report	Ngouali 77', 83'; Meister 81'; Zekhnini 88'; Tebo 90+1'	Stadium: Kurland kunstgress Attendance: 1,197; Referee: Ole-Alexander Ekeli Valen

10 April 2024	Hallingdal (5)	0–7	(1) Strømsgodset	Gol
18:30 CEST (UTC+2)		Report	Melkersen 33'; Hanssen 41', 85'; Therkelsen 45+2'; Mehnert 52', 75'; Ardraa 54'	Stadium: Gol kunstgress Attendance: 1,197; Referee: Magnus Nicolai Koløy

10 April 2024	Asker (4)	0–2	(2) Stabæk	Asker
18:30 CEST (UTC+2)		Report	Olderheim 72'; Diabaté 88'	Stadium: Føyka Stadion; Attendance: 949; Referee: Abdulhadi Al-Fahad

10 April 2024	Skreia (5)	0–8	(2) Raufoss	Skreia
19:00 CEST (UTC+2)		Report	Ampofo 13', 21', 35', 85', 90'; Nelson 14'; Badjie 24'; Ørsahl 44'	Stadium: Skreia Idrettsplass; Attendance: 500; Referee: Johan William Grundt

10 April 2024	Råde (5)	2–0	(3) Kvik Halden	Råde
19:00 CEST (UTC+2)	Mikalsen 78'; Zoulakis 89'	Report		Stadium: Råde idrettspark Referee: Lars Bratteli Jacobsen

10 April 2024	Express (5)	1–2 (a.e.t.)	(3) Arendal	Fevik
19:00 CEST (UTC+2)	Twumasi 57'	Report	Haga 34'; Lille-Løvø 96'	Stadium: Fevik stadion Referee: Javi Jean-Marc Conny Mertens

10 April 2024	Fu/Vo (4)	0–2	(3) Eidsvold Turn	Oppåkermoen
19:00 CEST (UTC+2)		Report	Henriksen 74'; Kaba 82'	Stadium: Funnefoss stadion Referee: Hakan Catalgøl

10 April 2024	Gamle Oslo (4)	0–2	(3) Skeid	Oslo
19:00 CEST (UTC+2)		Report	Stensrud 13', 43'	Stadium: Vallhall Arena; Referee: Satha Sritharan

11 April 2024	Lyngbø (5)	1–7	(1) Brann	Bergen
18:00 CEST (UTC+2)	Nilsen 79'	Report	Kornvig 1'; Crone 19'; Warming 37'; Heggebø 41', 47'; Finne 69'; Castro 90'	Stadium: Lyngbøparken; Attendance: 2,050; Referee: Jan Morten Tennøy

11 April 2024	Askøy (4)	4–4 (a.e.t.) (5–3 p)	(3) Sotra	Kleppestø
18:00 CEST (UTC+2)	Wik 33'; Knudsen 90'; Hjellegjerde 94', 96'	Report 1 Report 2	Falck 60', 87', 99'; Røttingen 113'	Stadium: Kleppestø kunstgress Referee: Kristoffer Hagenes

11 April 2024	Forus og Gausel (5)	0–10	(2) Bryne	Stavanger
18:00 CEST (UTC+2)		Report	Tveita 21'; Arsvoll 24'; Steffensen 28'; Jonassen 36'; Håland 37', 61', 75'; Hermansen 46'; Scriven 82'; Grønli 86'	Stadium: Knudamyra; Referee: Karoline Marie Jensen

11 April 2024	Ullern (4)	0–2	(4) Bærum	Oslo
18:00 CEST (UTC+2)		Report	Moula 45+1'; Bransdal 88'	Stadium: Ullernbanen; Referee: Ali Al Hatam

11 April 2024	Volda (5)	1–6	(3) Hødd	Volda
19:00 CEST (UTC+2)	Holsvik 57'	Report	Håheim-Elveseter 22'; Kallevåg 31'; Brandal 45+2'; Hjelmeseth 75'; Urnes 79'; Gjerde 90'	Stadium: Volda Stadion; Referee: Daniel Refsnes

11 April 2024	Sprint-Jeløy (4)	0–3	(2) Moss	Moss
19:00 CEST (UTC+2)		Report	Pedersen 6'; Hussein 45+1'; Lajqi 71'	Stadium: Bellevue; Referee: Herman Leiulfsrud Aass

11 April 2024	Toten (5)	1–3	(4) Elverum	Lena
19:30 CEST (UTC+2)	Hveem 72'	Report	Skoglund 40'; Løvberg 62'; Foudil 90+6'	Stadium: Østre Toten kunstgressbane Referee: Jonas Johnsen

11 April 2024	Flint (4)	0–6	(3) Eik Tønsberg	Tønsberg
19:30 CEST (UTC+2)		Report	Myrbakk 2', 36' (pen.); Rygel 4'; B. H. Andersen 23'; Blikås 58'; Sannes 67'	Stadium: Flint Esso Arena; Referee: Sebastian Vegstein Mikalsen

== Second round ==
The pair-ups for the second round were announced on 12 April 2024.

Number of teams per tier entering this round
Eliteserien (1)	1. divisjon (2)	2. divisjon (3)	3. divisjon (4)	4. divisjon (5)	Total
14 / 16	15 / 16	18 / 28	15 / 84	2 / 254	64 / 398

23 April 2024	Skeid (3)	1–2	(2) Raufoss	Oslo
18:00 CEST (UTC+2)	Steiring 86' (pen.)	Report	Nelson 25'; Østerud 46'	Stadium: Nordre Åsen; Attendance: 237; Referee: Herman Holthe

24 April 2024	Skjervøy (4)	0–1	(3) Alta	Skjervøy
18:00 CEST (UTC+2)		Report	Holst-Larsen 27'	Stadium: Lerøy Stadion; Attendance: 150; Referee: Eirik Wisted-Thu

24 April 2024	Fløya (4)	0–6	(1) Tromsø	Tromsø
18:00 CEST (UTC+2)		Report	Johnsgård 13', 37'; Hjertø-Dahl 51', 81', 90'; Winther 90+4' (pen.)	Stadium: Fløyabanen; Attendance: 645; Referee: Hakan Catalgøl

24 April 2024	Junkeren (3)	0–2	(1) Bodø/Glimt	Bodø
18:00 CEST (UTC+2)		Report	Saltnes 25'; Sørli 87'	Stadium: Nordlandshallen; Attendance: 831; Referee: Mohammad Hafezi

24 April 2024	Melhus (4)	1–5	(2) Ranheim	Melhus
18:00 CEST (UTC+2)	Ramlo 82'	Report	Johnsen 19'; Mogensen 22', 46'; Solli 38'; Wenaas 61'	Stadium: Gruva; Attendance: 250; Referee: Oliver Skaret Barsøe

24 April 2024	Stjørdals-Blink (3)	0–1	(2) Levanger	Stjørdalshalsen
18:00 CEST (UTC+2)		Report	Stakset 43'	Stadium: M.U.S Stadion Sandskogan; Attendance: 635; Referee: Robert Eggen

24 April 2024	Strindheim (3)	1–2	(1) Molde	Trondheim
18:00 CEST (UTC+2)	Nytoft 47'	Report	Olanare 38', 53'	Stadium: Strindheim kunstgress Attendance: 679; Referee: Mathias Støfringshaug

24 April 2024	Træff (4)	1–2	(1) Kristiansund	Molde
18:00 CEST (UTC+2)	Flønes 9'	Report	Willumsson 43'; Guèye 70'	Stadium: Reknesbanen; Attendance: 300; Referee: Torgeir Halsen

24 April 2024	Hødd (3)	1–0 (a.e.t.)	(2) Aalesund	Ulsteinvik
18:00 CEST (UTC+2)	Televik 98'	Report		Stadium: Høddvoll; Attendance: 1,408; Referee: Mathias Kringstad

24 April 2024	Stord (4)	0–4	(3) Lysekloster	Stord
18:00 CEST (UTC+2)		Report	Dang 19' (pen.); Kamanzi 60'; Campher 65', 80'	Stadium: Stord Stadion; Attendance: 123; Referee: Mattias Gripsgård Sakstad

24 April 2024	Bjarg (4)	0–3	(2) Åsane	Bergen
18:00 CEST (UTC+2)		Report	Nygard 7', 33'; Strand 47'	Stadium: Stavollen Kunstgress; Attendance: 200; Referee: Jan Morten Tennøy

24 April 2024	Frøya (4)	2–2 (a.e.t.) (5–6 p)	(2) Sogndal	Bergen
18:00 CEST (UTC+2)	Skutle 45+2'; Vindenes 87'	Report; Penalties	Arrocha 35'; Høyland 71'	Stadium: Frøya Idrettspark; Attendance: 447; Referee: Markus Lille
	Penalties
	Vetås (penalty scored); Vindenes (penalty scored); Byrkjeland (penalty scored); Rojas (penalty scored); Helland (penalty missed); Hodnefjell (penalty scored); Stjernberg (penalty missed)		(penalty scored) Flo; (penalty missed) Hoven; (penalty scored) Eriksson; (penalty scored) Nundal; (penalty scored) Sjølstad; (penalty scored) Twum; (penalty scored) Øren

24 April 2024	Askøy (4)	2–5	(1) Brann	Strusshamn
18:00 CEST (UTC+2)	Aasbø 6', 29'	Report	Heggebø 24'; Warming 25'; Soltvedt 50' (pen.); Castro 54'; Blomberg 85'	Stadium: Follese Tertnes Holding Arena; Attendance: 3,415; Referee: Steinar Hauge

24 April 2024	Torvastad (5)	3–4	(1) Viking	Torvastad
18:00 CEST (UTC+2)	Grønningen 45+1'; Lippestad 49'; Miljeteig 53'	Report	Salvesen 7', 16', 87' (pen.); Kvia-Egeskog 75'	Stadium: Torvastad idrettssenter Attendance: 2,000; Referee: Freek van Herk

24 April 2024	Vard Haugesund (3)	0–4	(2) Sandnes Ulf	Haugesund
18:00 CEST (UTC+2)		Report	Høiland 18', 34'; Brkić 21'; Jensen 90'	Stadium: Haugesund Stadion; Attendance: 102; Referee: Sondre Brudvik

24 April 2024	Mandalskameratene (4)	0–7	(2) Bryne	Mandal
18:00 CEST (UTC+2)		Report	Årsvoll 8', 76'; Jonassen 31'; Dybevik 80'; Mneney 86'; Scriven 88'; Haland 90+1'	Stadium: Idrettsparken; Attendance: 1,700; Referee: Javi Mertens

24 April 2024	Fløy (3)	0–1	(2) Egersund	Flekkerøy
18:00 CEST (UTC+2)		Report	Eggen 78'	Stadium: Cemo Arena; Attendance: 643; Referee: Jørgen Haga

24 April 2024	Pors (4)	0–1	(1) Odd	Porsgrunn
18:00 CEST (UTC+2)		Report	Ivančević 72'	Stadium: Pors Stadion; Attendance: 2,123; Referee: Eivind Bodding

24 April 2024	Fram (4)	0–3	(3) Arendal	Larvik
18:00 CEST (UTC+2)		Report	Williams 4'; Alemseged 34'; Lille-Løvø 90'	Stadium: Framparken; Attendance: 545; Referee: Arion Shaqiri

24 April 2024	Elverum (4)	2–4	(1) HamKam	Elverum
18:00 CEST (UTC+2)	Dadras 10'; Alhajjar 82'	Report	Kjærgaard 20'; Ødegård 25', 35'; Kirkevold 78'	Stadium: Elverum Stadion; Attendance: 743; Referee: Stian Røvig Sletner

24 April 2024	Eidsvold Turn (3)	1–0	(2) Mjøndalen	Eidsvoll
18:00 CEST (UTC+2)	Hokstad 83'	Report		Stadium: Myhrer stadion Attendance: 224; Referee: Haakon Arve Pedersen Bue

24 April 2024	Ull/Kisa (3)	1–3	(1) Rosenborg	Jessheim
18:00 CEST (UTC+2)	Skille 29'	Report	Tagseth 7', 17'; Väänänen 77'	Stadium: Jessheim Stadion; Attendance: 1,918; Referee: Ali Al Hatam

24 April 2024	Frigg (4)	0–3	(1) KFUM Oslo	Oslo
18:00 CEST (UTC+2)		Report	Hickson 5', 78'; Ndiaye 53'	Stadium: Tørteberg kunstgress Attendance: 290; Referee: Herman Leiulfsrud Aass

24 April 2024	Bærum (4)	0–5	(2) Stabæk	Sandvika
18:00 CEST (UTC+2)		Report	Hegardt 24'; Kostadinov 37'; Nysæter 45+1'; Christensen 65'; Opseth 75'	Stadium: AJ Arena; Attendance: 843; Referee: Ajdin Medic

24 April 2024	Kjelsås (3)	3–2	(2) Kongsvinger	Oslo
18:00 CEST (UTC+2)	Aslaksrud 41'; Askengren 61'; K. Eriksen 90'	Report	M. A. Eriksen 12'; Christiansen 35'	Stadium: Grefsen Stadion; Attendance: 532; Referee: Abdulhadi Al-Fahad

24 April 2024	Råde (5)	2–1	(2) Moss	Råde
18:00 CEST (UTC+2)	Topallaj 52'; Mikalsen 75'	Report	Jakobsen 6'	Stadium: Råde idrettspark Attendance: 1,012; Referee: Ola Kellerhals

24 April 2024	Tromsdalen (3)	3–1 (a.e.t.)	(2) Lyn	Tromsø
19:00 CEST (UTC+2)	Pedersen 28'; Larsen 117'; Swaleh 120+2'	Report	Hanstad 84'	Stadium: TUIL Arena; Attendance: 421; Referee: Kristian Kristiansen

24 April 2024	Jerv (3)	0–3	(1) Strømsgodset	Arendal
19:00 CEST (UTC+2)		Report	Westerlund 38'; Mehnert 41'; Therkelsen 90+3'	Stadium: Norac Stadion; Attendance: 402; Referee: Aleksander Skjold Vermundsen

24 April 2024	Strømmen (3)	4–5	(1) Lillestrøm	Strømmen
19:05 CEST (UTC+2)	Lunde 50'; Åsvestad 75', 77', 87' (pen.)	Report	Lehne Olsen 6', 33', 40'; Vá 29'; Furaha 61'	Stadium: Strømmen Stadion; Attendance: 1,286; Referee: Harald Vollstad Sletner

25 April 2024	Oppsal (4)	0–4	(2) Vålerenga	Oslo
17:00 CEST (UTC+2)		Report	El-Abdellaoui 25'; Hedenstad 51'; Kjelsen 61'; Rijks 86'	Stadium: Trasop idrettspark Attendance: 3,248; Referee: Ole-Alexander Ekeli Valen

25 April 2024	Eik Tønsberg (3)	2–5	(1) Fredrikstad	Tønsberg
18:00 CEST (UTC+2)	Danielsen 27'; Myrbakk 52'	Report	Danielsen 22' (o.g.); Metcalfe 41'; Hendriksson 58'; Magnússon 78'; Kjær 85'	Stadium: Tønsberg Gressbane; Attendance: 2,830; Referee: Magnus Nicolai Koløy

25 April 2024	Hønefoss (4)	1–2	(1) Sarpsborg 08	Hønefoss
18:00 CEST (UTC+2)	Pedersen 4'	Report	Hiim 7'; Sandberg 67' (pen.)	Stadium: Aka Arena; Attendance: 896; Referee: Jørgen Haugen

== Third round ==
The pair-ups for the third round were announced on 24 April 2024.

Number of teams per tier entering this round
Eliteserien (1)	1. divisjon (2)	2. divisjon (3)	3. divisjon (4)	4. divisjon (5)	Total
14 / 16	10 / 16	7 / 28	0 / 84	1 / 254	32 / 398

1 May 2024	Sogndal (2)	1–1 (a.e.t.) (4–5 p)	(1) KFUM Oslo	Sogndal
14:30 CEST (UTC+2)	Stavø 72'	Report; Penalties	Rasch 89'	Stadium: Fosshaugane Campus; Attendance: 1,706; Referee: Steinar Hauge
	Penalties
	Arrocha (penalty scored); Flo (penalty scored); Høyland (penalty missed); Stavø (penalty scored); Hoven (penalty scored)		(penalty scored) Rasch; (penalty scored) Hestnes; (penalty scored) Dahl; (penalty scored) Hadzic; (penalty scored) Hummelvoll-Nuñez

1 May 2024	Kjelsås (3)	1–2	(3) Lysekloster	Oslo
14:30 CEST (UTC+2)	Sture 43'	Report	Dang 32'; Gamachis 38'	Stadium: Grefsen Stadion; Attendance: 853; Referee: Mischa Kellerhals

1 May 2024	Bodø/Glimt (1)	2–4	(1) Lillestrøm	Bodø
14:30 CEST (UTC+2)	Evjen 19'; Hauge 41'	Report	Åsen 4', 49'; Vá 28'; Gabrielsen 63'	Stadium: Aspmyra Stadion; Attendance: 4,339; Referee: Ola Hobber Nilsen

1 May 2024	Fredrikstad (1)	1–0	(1) Rosenborg	Fredrikstad
14:30 CEST (UTC+2)	Aga 90+1'	Report		Stadium: Fredrikstad Stadion; Attendance: 6,073; Referee: Kristoffer Hagenes

1 May 2024	Egersund (2)	1–3	(1) HamKam	Egersund
14:30 CEST (UTC+2)	Elvevold 33'	Report	Ødegård 13'; Mares 41' (pen.); Udahl 54'	Stadium: Idrettsparken; Attendance: 1,125; Referee: Svein Tore Sinnes

1 May 2024	Eidsvold Turn (3)	2–1	(2) Åsane	Eidsvoll
14:30 CEST (UTC+2)	Kaba 1'; Delaveris 9'	Report	Møller Wolfe 49'	Stadium: Myhrer stadion Referee: Ajdin Medic

1 May 2024	Levanger (2)	1–0	(1) Brann	Levanger
14:30 CEST (UTC+2)	Gunnes 8'	Report		Stadium: Moan Fritidspark; Attendance: 2,483; Referee: Stian Røvig Sletner

1 May 2024	Strømsgodset (1)	4–0	(1) Kristiansund	Drammen
16:00 CEST (UTC+2)	Krasniqi 25'; Stengel 41'; Tómasson 45+1'; Mehnert 82'	Report		Stadium: Marienlyst Stadion; Attendance: 2,098; Referee: Marius Lien

1 May 2024	Hødd (3)	1–3	(1) Molde	Ulsteinvik
16:00 CEST (UTC+2)	Håheim-Elveseter 56'	Report	Samuel 25'; Granaas 62'; Breivik 69'	Stadium: Høddvoll; Attendance: 2,317; Referee: Mohammad Usman Aslam

1 May 2024	Tromsdalen (3)	0–4	(1) Viking	Tromsø
16:00 CEST (UTC+2)		Report	Svendsen 17'; Christiansen 57'; Salvesen 70', 83'	Stadium: TUIL Arena; Attendance: 1,504; Referee: Magnus Nicolai Koløy

1 May 2024	Sandnes Ulf (2)	5–4	(1) Odd	Sandnes
16:00 CEST (UTC+2)	Braut 20'; Kvernstuen 35', 64'; Nyhagen 45+2'; Sakor 72'	Report	Ivančević 9', 68'; Tewelde 25', 82' (pen.)	Stadium: Øster Hus Arena; Attendance: 1,738; Referee: Jan Morten Tennøy

1 May 2024	Arendal (3)	0–1	(2) Bryne	Arendal
16:00 CEST (UTC+2)		Report	Jonassen 12'	Stadium: Bjønnes stadion Attendance: 804; Referee: Anders Bodding

1 May 2024	Vålerenga (2)	1–0 (a.e.t.)	(1) Tromsø	Oslo
16:00 CEST (UTC+2)	Juklerød 100'	Report		Stadium: Intility Arena; Attendance: 7,135; Referee: Tore Hansen

1 May 2024	Råde (5)	0–1	(1) Sarpsborg 08	Råde
18:00 CEST (UTC+2)		Report	M. H. Andersen 62'	Stadium: Råde idrettspark Attendance: 1,923; Referee: Daniel Higraff

1 May 2024	Ranheim (2)	1–2	(2) Raufoss	Trondheim
18:00 CEST (UTC+2)	Mogensen 48' (pen.)	Report	Emsis 39'; Østerud 77' (pen.)	Stadium: EXTRA Arena; Attendance: 725; Referee: Marius Hansen Grøtta

1 May 2024	Alta (3)	3–4	(2) Stabæk	Alta
19:00 CEST (UTC+2)	Reginiussen 8'; Suhr-Stamnes 90+1'; Hestad 90+3'	Report	Spiten-Nysæter 4'; Andresen 39'; Olderheim 55'; Fardal Opseth 62'	Stadium: Finnmarkshallen; Attendance: 843; Referee: Eivind Bodding

== Fourth round ==
The pair-ups for the fourth round were announced on 1 May 2024.

Number of teams per tier entering this round
Eliteserien (1)	1. divisjon (2)	2. divisjon (3)	3. divisjon (4)	4. divisjon (5)	Total
8 / 16	6 / 16	2 / 28	0 / 84	0 / 254	16 / 398

8 May 2024	Molde (1)	4–2	(1) Sarpsborg 08	Molde
18:00 CEST (UTC+2)	Eriksen 48'; Hagelskjær 74'; Eikrem 78'; Hestad 82'	Report	Reinhardsen 33'; Ørjasæter 49'	Stadium: Aker Stadion; Attendance: 2,083; Referee: Sivert Amland

8 May 2024	Lysekloster (3)	2–3 (a.e.t.)	(1) KFUM Oslo	Lysefjorden
18:00 CEST (UTC+2)	Bolsø 71'; Håbestad 87'	Report	Rasch 31' (pen.); Dahl 90+4'; Hestnes 115'	Stadium: Lysekloster Family Arena; Attendance: 700; Referee: Daniel Higraff

8 May 2024	Raufoss (2)	2–3	(1) Fredrikstad	Raufoss
18:00 CEST (UTC+2)	Engebakken 13'; Nordbø 28'	Report	Johansen 11'; Sørløkk 24'; Hendriksson 49'	Stadium: Nammo Stadion; Attendance: 1,142; Referee: Ola Hobber Nilsen

8 May 2024	Eidsvold Turn (3)	3–5	(2) Sandnes Ulf	Eidsvoll
18:00 CEST (UTC+2)	Kaba 57'; Velldal 83'; Stokke 90+4'	Report	Høiland 32'; Kvernstuen 44', 52'; Brkić 55'; Berger 61' (pen.)	Stadium: Myhrer stadion Referee: Mathias Støfringshaug

8 May 2024	Stabæk (2)	5–1	(2) Bryne	Bærum
18:00 CEST (UTC+2)	Næss 36'; Olderheim 48'; Vinge 81'; Opseth 83'; Hermansen 87'	Report	Scriven 90+2'	Stadium: Nadderud Stadion; Attendance: 1,210; Referee: Christian Moen

8 May 2024	Vålerenga (2)	2–2 (a.e.t.) (4–3 p)	(1) HamKam	Oslo
18:00 CEST (UTC+2)	Hagen 5'; Riisnæs 23'	Report; Penalties	Kiil Olsen 53' (o.g.); Simenstad 90+4'	Stadium: Intility Arena; Attendance: 7,042; Referee: Kristoffer Hagenes
	Penalties
	Kreuzriegler (penalty missed); Kamara (penalty scored); Hedenstad (penalty scored); Kiil Olsen (penalty missed); Borchgrevink (penalty scored); Ambina (penalty scored)		(penalty missed) Mares; (penalty scored) Simenstad; (penalty missed) Gonstad; (penalty scored) Kirkevold; (penalty scored) Jónsson; (penalty missed) Norheim

8 May 2024	Levanger (2)	4–2 (a.e.t.)	(1) Viking	Levanger
19:05 CEST (UTC+2)	Gunnes 1'; Bojadzic 50' (pen.); Lorentsen 96'; Bruseth 108'	Report	Christiansen 16'; Kvia-Egeskog 76'	Stadium: Moan Fritidspark; Attendance: 2,003; Referee: Marius Lien

9 May 2024	Strømsgodset (1)	3–4 (a.e.t.)	(1) Lillestrøm	Drammen
18:00 CEST (UTC+2)	E. U. Andersen 36', 69'; Stengel 45+2' (pen.); Farji 73'	Report	Lundemo 21'; Kitolano 34'; Vá 45'; Åsen 117'	Stadium: Marienlyst Stadion; Attendance: 4,336; Referee: Sigurd Smehus Kringstad

== Quarter-finals ==
The pair-ups for the quarter-finals were announced on 8 May 2024.

Number of teams per tier entering this round
Eliteserien (1)	1. divisjon (2)	2. divisjon (3)	3. divisjon (4)	4. divisjon (5)	Total
4 / 16	4 / 16	0 / 28	0 / 84	0 / 254	8 / 398

5 October 2024	Sandnes Ulf (2)	2–0	(2) Levanger	Sandnes
19:00 CEST (UTC+2)	Kleppa 7'; Roaldsøy 60'	Report		Stadium: Øster Hus Arena; Attendance: 1,502; Referee: Sivert Amland

6 October 2024	Stabæk (2)	2–3	(1) KFUM Oslo	Bærum
14:30 CEST (UTC+2)	Wendt 40'; Diabaté 48'	Report	Nuñez 25'; Aleesami 57'; Njie 65'	Stadium: Nadderud Stadion; Attendance: 2,120; Referee: Mohammad Usman Aslam

6 October 2024	Lillestrøm (1)	1–2	(1) Molde	Lillestrøm
17:15 CEST (UTC+2)	Røssing-Lelesiit 78'	Report	Brynhildsen 29'; Ihler 88'	Stadium: Åråsen Stadion; Attendance: 5,181; Referee: Espen Eskås

6 October 2024	Vålerenga (2)	0–1 (a.e.t.)	(1) Fredrikstad	Oslo
20:00 CEST (UTC+2)		Report	Bjørlo 97'	Stadium: Intility Arena; Attendance: 13,276; Referee: Sigurd Smehus Kringstad

== Semi-finals ==
The pair-ups for the semi-finals were announced on 8 May 2024.

Number of teams per tier entering this round
Eliteserien (1)	1. divisjon (2)	2. divisjon (3)	3. divisjon (4)	4. divisjon (5)	Total
3 / 16	1 / 16	0 / 28	0 / 84	0 / 272	4 / 416

30 October 2024	Sandnes Ulf (2)	0–2	(1) Molde	Sandnes
18:00 CET (UTC+1)		Report	Eriksen 40'; Haugen 78'	Stadium: Øster Hus Arena; Attendance: 4,591; Referee: Svein Tore Sinnes

30 October 2024	Fredrikstad (1)	0–0 (a.e.t.) (6–5 p)	(1) KFUM Oslo	Fredrikstad
20:30 CET (UTC+1)		Report		Stadium: Fredrikstad Stadion; Attendance: 10,564; Referee: Kristoffer Hagenes
	Penalties
	Bjørlo (penalty scored); Kjelsrud Johansen (penalty missed); Bjartalíð (penalty scored); Hendriksson (penalty scored); Rafn (penalty scored); Magnússon (penalty scored); Kjær (penalty scored)		(penalty missed) Ndiaye; (penalty scored) Hestnes; (penalty scored) Aleesami; (penalty scored) Sandal; (penalty scored) Nuñez; (penalty scored) Okeke; (penalty missed) Akinyemi

== Final ==
The final was played on 7 December 2024.

7 December 2024
16:00 CET (UTC+1)

Fredrikstad	0–0 (a.e.t.)	Molde
	Report
Penalties
Bjørlo (penalty scored); Bjartalíð (penalty scored); Hendriksson (penalty scored); Skogvold (penalty scored); Magnússon (penalty scored)	5–4	(penalty missed) Haugan; (penalty scored) Stenevik; (penalty scored) Gulbrandsen; (penalty scored) Eikrem; (penalty scored) Løvik

Ullevaal Stadion, Oslo
Attendance: 23,058
Referee: Sigurd Smehus Kringstad (Valder)

== Top scorers ==
As of 30 October 2024

Rank	Player	Club	Goals
1	(Norway) Tobias Hestad	Alta	8
2	(Norway) Tommy Høiland	Sandnes Ulf	6
3	(Norway) Lars-Jørgen Salvesen	Viking	5
3	(Ghana) James Ampofo	Raufoss	5
3	(Faroe Islands) Brandur Hendriksson	Fredrikstad	5
6	11 players		4
