= 2024 KFUM-Kameratene Oslo season =

KFUM Oslo
2024 season
- Head coach: Johannes Moesgaard
- Stadium: KFUM Arena
- Eliteserien: 8th
- Norwegian Cup: Semi-finals
- Top goalscorer: League: Johannes Nuñez (10); All: Johannes Nuñez (14)
Home colours	Away colours

The 2024 season was KFUM Oslo's 85th season in existence and the club's first season ever in the top flight of Norwegian football. In addition to the domestic league, KFUM Oslo participated in this season's edition of the Norwegian Football Cup.

== Players ==
=== First team squad ===
As of 28 March 2024

Note: Flags indicate national team as defined under FIFA eligibility rules; some limited exceptions apply. Players may hold more than one non-FIFA nationality.

No.	Pos.	Nation	Player
1	GK	NOR	Emil Ødegaard
2	DF	NOR	Haitam Aleesami
3	DF	NOR	Ayoub Aleesami
4	DF	GAM	Momodou Lion Njie
5	DF	NOR	Akinsola Akinyemi
6	MF	NOR	Remi-André Svindland
7	MF	NOR	Robin Rasch
8	MF	NOR	Simen Hestnes
9	FW	NOR	Johannes Nuñez
10	FW	NOR	Moussa Njie
11	FW	NOR	Obilor Okeke
13	GK	NOR	William Da Rocha
14	MF	NOR	Håkon Hoseth
15	DF	NOR	Mathias Tønnessen
16	DF	NOR	Jonas Hjorth
17	MF	NOR	Teodor Berg Haltvik
19	FW	NOR	Niclas Schjøth Semmen

No.	Pos.	Nation	Player
22	FW	NOR	Petter Nosa Dahl (on loan from Bodø/Glimt)
23	DF	NOR	Mohammed Hopsdal Abbas
25	MF	NOR	Sverre Sandal
26	DF	NOR	Joachim Prent-Eckbo
27	FW	NOR	Andreas Gundersen
28	FW	SEN	Mane Mor Ndiaye
29	DF	NOR	Kristoffer Lassen Harrison
30	MF	NOR	Adnan Hadzic
31	GK	NOR	Henri Sørlie
33	DF	NOR	Amin Nouri
35	GK	NOR	Idar Lysgård
42	DF	NOR	David Hickson
43	MF	USA	Adam Saldana
—	DF	NOR	Magnus Mehl
—	FW	NOR	Martin Gavey
—	MF	NOR	Sander Barbosa

=== Out on loan ===
Note: Flags indicate national team as defined under FIFA eligibility rules; some limited exceptions apply. Players may hold more than one non-FIFA nationality.

No.	Pos.	Nation	Player
12	GK	NOR	Andreas Vedeler (at Bærum until 31 December 2024)
20	FW	NOR	Yasir Sa'Ad (at Skeid until 31 December 2024)
21	FW	NOR	Sondre Halvorsen (at Follo until 31 December 2024)

== Transfers ==
=== Winter ===
In: Note: Flags indicate national team as defined under FIFA eligibility rules; some limited exceptions apply. Players may hold more than one non-FIFA nationality.

No.	Pos.	Nation	Player
2	DF	NOR	Haitam Aleesami (free transfer)
13	GK	NOR	William Da Rocha (from Kjelsås)
19	FW	NOR	Niclas Schjøth Semmen (from Drøbak-Frogn)
22	FW	NOR	Petter Nosa Dahl (on loan from Bodø/Glimt)
31	GK	NOR	Henri Sørlie (promoted from junior squad)
33	DF	NOR	Amin Nouri (from Hamkam)
42	FW	NOR	David Hickson (from Skeid)
—	MF	USA	Adam Saldana (from (United States) LA Galaxy)
—	FW	SEN	Mame Mor Ndiaye (from Åsane)

Out: Note: Flags indicate national team as defined under FIFA eligibility rules; some limited exceptions apply. Players may hold more than one non-FIFA nationality.

No.	Pos.	Nation	Player
2	DF	NOR	Keivan Ghaedamini (released)
12	GK	NOR	Andreas Vedeler (on loan to Bærum)
13	GK	NOR	Morten Stakkeng Vang (to Gamle Oslo)
20	FW	NOR	Yasir Sa'Ad (on loan to Grorud)
21	FW	NOR	Sondre Spieler Halvorsen (on loan to Follo)
28	MF	NOR	Jones El-Abdellaoui (loan return to Vålerenga)
31	GK	IRI	Sosha Makani (released)
33	DF	NOR	William Silfver-Ramage (to (Italy) Hellas Verona Primavera)

== Competitions ==
=== Overview ===
Competition	First match	Last match	Starting round	Final position	Record							
Competition	First match	Last match	Starting round	Final position	Pld	W	D	L	GF	GA	GD	Win %
Eliteserien	2 April 2024	1 December 2024	Matchday 1	8th	30	9	10	11	35	36	−1	30.00
Norwegian Cup	10 April 2024	30 October 2024	First round	Semi-finals	6	4	2	0	12	5	+7	66.67
Total					36	13	12	11	47	41	+6	36.11

Last updated: 1 December 2024
Source: Soccerway

=== Eliteserien ===
==== League table ====
Pos	Team	Pld	W	D	L	GF	GA	GD	Pts	Qualification or relegation
6	Fredrikstad	30	14	9	7	39	35	+4	51	Qualification for the Europa League third qualifying round (Note: Fredrikstad qualified for the Europa League third qualifying round by winning the 2024 Norwegian Football Cup.)
7	Strømsgodset	30	10	8	12	32	40	−8	38	
8	KFUM	30	9	10	11	35	36	−1	37	
9	Sarpsborg	30	10	7	13	43	55	−12	37	
10	Sandefjord	30	9	7	14	41	46	−5	34	

Source: Football Association of Norway (in Norwegian)
Rules for classification: 1) Points; 2) Goal difference; 3) Goals scored; 4) Head-to-head points; 5) Head-to-head goal difference; 6) Head-to-head goals scored.

==== Results summary ====
Overall								Home						Away					
Pld	W	D	L	GF	GA	GD	Pts	W	D	L	GF	GA	GD	W	D	L	GF	GA	GD
30	9	10	11	35	36	−1	37	2	7	6	14	20	−6	7	3	5	21	16	+5

Last updated: 1 December 2024.

==== Results by round ====
Round	1	2	3	4	5	6	7	8	9	10	11	12	13	14	15	16	17	18	19	20	21	22	23	24	25	26	27	28	29	30
Ground	H	A	H	A	H	A	H	A	H	A	H	A	H	A	A	H	A	H	H	A	H	A	H	A	H	A	H	A	H	A
Result	D	D	L	W	D	W	L	W	D	D	D	L	L	W	W	D	D	W	L	L	W	L	D	W	D	L	L	L	L	W
Position	8	13	13	9	10	7	9	5	6	7	7	8	10	8	6	6	8	6	7	7	7	7	7	7	7	7	7	8	8	8

A = Away; H = Home; W = Win; D = Draw; L = Loss

==== Matches ====
The league fixtures were announced on 20 December 2023.

2 April 2024 1	KFUM Oslo	1–1	HamKam	Oslo
19:00 CEST (UTC+2)	Lion Njie (yellow card) 86'; Nosa Dahl 90'	Report	Mawa 12'; Onsrud (yellow card) 29'; Kurtovic (yellow card) 86'; Ødegård (yellow card) 86'	Stadium: Intility Arena; Attendance: 4,018; Referee: Mohammad Usman Aslam
Note: The match was played at Intility Arena due to the KFUM's home stadium KFUM Arena's undergoing renovation.

7 April 2024 2	Kristiansund	1–1	KFUM Oslo	Kristiansund
14:30 CEST (UTC+2)	Sivertsen 45+1' (pen.); Jarl (yellow card) 47'	Report	Akinyemi (yellow card) 44'; Hoseth 45+3'; Tønnessen (yellow card) 55'; Nosa Dahl (yellow card) 78'	Stadium: Kristiansund Stadion; Attendance: 3,549; Referee: Marius Lien

16 April 2024 3	KFUM Oslo	1–3	Strømsgodset	Oslo
19:00 CEST (UTC+2)	Hestnes 66'	Report	Andersen 7'; Krasniqi (yellow card) 39'; Stengel 42', 85'	Stadium: Intility Arena; Attendance: 2,943; Referee: Svein Tore Sinnes
Note: The match was played at Intility Arena due to the KFUM's home stadium KFUM Arena's undergoing renovation.

21 April 2024 4	Sarpsborg 08	0–2	KFUM Oslo	Sarpsborg
17:00 CEST (UTC+2)	Wichne (yellow card) 36'	Report	Nuñez 16'; Akinyemi (yellow card) 34'; Nosa Dahl 45+3' (yellow card) 45+3'; Sandal (yellow card) 49'	Stadium: Sarpsborg Stadion; Attendance: 4,273; Referee: Sivert Øksnes Amland

28 April 2024 5	KFUM Oslo	1–1	Brann	Oslo
17:00 CEST (UTC+2)	Rasch (yellow card) 35'; Lion Njie (yellow card) 45+5'; Hestnes (yellow card) 90+5'	Report	Finne (red card) 27'; Crone (yellow card) 79'; Larsen (yellow card) 81'	Stadium: KFUM Arena; Attendance: 3,298; Referee: Marius Hansen Grøtta

5 May 2024 6	Haugesund	0–1	KFUM Oslo	Haugesund
17:00 CEST (UTC+2)	Diarra (yellow card) 17'; Krusnell (yellow card) 80'	Report	Nuñez 44'; Haltvik (yellow card) 90+2'	Stadium: Haugesund Stadion; Attendance: 4,017; Referee: Mathias Støfringshaug

12 May 2024 7	KFUM Oslo	1–4	Fredrikstad	Oslo
17:00 CEST (UTC+2)	Svindland 60' (pen.); H. Aleesami (yellow card) 62'	Report	Bjørlo 3', 7'; Kjær 33', 45'	Stadium: KFUM Arena; Attendance: 3,206; Referee: Christian Moen

16 May 2024 8	Rosenborg	1–3	KFUM Oslo	Trondheim
18:00 CEST (UTC+2)	Lion Njie 12' (o.g.); Pereira (yellow card) 77'; Tagseth (yellow card) 80'; Nelson (yellow card) 90'	Report	Hestnes (yellow card) 25'; Rasch 38'; Nosa Dahl 47'; Nuñez (yellow card) 54' (goal) 62'; Svindland (yellow card) 80'	Stadium: Lerkendal Stadion; Attendance: 21,426; Referee: Sigurd Kringstad

20 May 2024 9	KFUM Oslo	0–0	Odd	Oslo
17:00 CEST (UTC+2)	H. Aleesami (yellow card) 34'; Hickson (yellow card) 37'; Saldaña (yellow card) 90+1'	Report	Midtskogen (yellow card) 30'; Ivančević (yellow card) 74'	Stadium: KFUM Arena; Attendance: 2,409; Referee: Kristoffer Hagenes

24 May 2024 10	Bodø/Glimt	2–2	KFUM Oslo	Bodø
19:00 CEST (UTC+2)	Grønbæk 41'; Gundersen (yellow card) 51'; Hauge 75'	Report	Nosa Dahl 45'; Nuñez 64'; Hoseth (yellow card) 89'	Stadium: Aspmyra Stadion; Attendance: 6,243; Referee: Marius Hansen Grøtta

2 June 2024 11	KFUM Oslo	3–3	Sandefjord	Oslo
17:00 CEST (UTC+2)	Ndiaye 66'; H. Aleesami 75'; Hestnes 89'	Report	Kristiansen (yellow card) 9' (red card) 36'; Amin 68'; Markovic 73'; Risan Mørk 81'; Cheng (yellow card) 87'	Stadium: KFUM Arena; Attendance: 2,759; Referee: Daniel Higraff

27 June 2024 12	Lillestrøm	2–1	KFUM Oslo	Lillestrøm
21:15 CEST (UTC+2)	Garnås 19'; Vá (yellow card) 45+3'; Moen Foss 86'; Røssing-Lelesiit (yellow card) 90+6'	Report	Nuñez 48'; Akinyemi (yellow card) 82'; H. Aleesami (yellow card) 90+6'	Stadium: Åråsen Stadion; Attendance: 6,212; Referee: Mohammad Usman Aslam

7 July 2024 13	KFUM Oslo	1–2	Viking	Oslo
17:00 CEST (UTC+2)	Nosa Dahl 22'; Rasch (yellow card) 41'; Hestnes (yellow card) 77'	Report	Svendsen 81'; Tangen 85'; Kvia-Egeskog (yellow card) 89'	Stadium: KFUM Arena; Attendance: 2,807; Referee: Marius Hansen Grøtta

13 July 2024 14	Tromsø	1–2	KFUM Oslo	Tromsø
22:00 CEST (UTC+2)	Nordås (yellow card) 62'; Romsaas 63'; Norheim (yellow card) 68'	Report	Akinyemi (yellow card) 44'; Nuñez 50'; Lion Njie 84'	Stadium: Romssa Arena; Attendance: 5,267; Referee: Marius Lien

20 July 2024 15	Molde	2–3	KFUM Oslo	Molde
20:15 CEST (UTC+2)	Løvik 20'; Breivik (yellow card) 57'; Eikrem 65'; Dæhli (yellow card) 77'; Haugen (yellow card) 90+8'	Report	Nosa Dahl 22'; H. Aleesami 34'; Nuñez 83'; Nouri (yellow card) 90+8'	Stadium: Aker Stadion; Attendance: 7,564; Referee: Sigurd Kringstad

27 July 2024 16	KFUM Oslo	1–1	Bodø/Glimt	Oslo
16:00 CEST (UTC+2)	Ndiaye 25'; Hjorth (yellow card) 66'	Report	Saltnes 52'	Stadium: KFUM Arena; Attendance: 3,299; Referee: Svein Tore Sinnes

4 August 2024 17	Fredrikstad	0–0	KFUM Oslo	Fredrikstad
17:00 CEST (UTC+2)		Report	Rasch (yellow card) 69'	Stadium: Fredrikstad Stadion; Attendance: 7,616; Referee: Mathias Støfringshaug

11 August 2024 18	KFUM Oslo	1–0	Rosenborg	Oslo
17:00 CEST (UTC+2)	H. Aleesami (yellow card) 11' (yellow-red card) 58'; Njie (yellow card) 39'; Nuñez (penalty missed) 51' 51'; Sandal (yellow card) 90+6'	Report	Nemčík (yellow card) 33'; Tangvik (yellow card) 50'; Sæter (yellow card) 63'	Stadium: KFUM-Arena; Attendance: 3,300; Referee: Kristoffer Hagenes

18 August 2024 19	KFUM Oslo	0–1	Tromsø	Oslo
17:00 CEST (UTC+2)		Report	Erlien (yellow card) 11'; Barry (yellow card) 57'; Cornic 79'; Romsaas (yellow card) 90+7'	Stadium: KFUM-Arena; Attendance: 2,640; Referee: Daniel Higraff

18 September 2024 20	Brann	2–0	KFUM Oslo	Bergen
19:00 CEST (UTC+2)	Castro 82' (pen.); Kartum 90+6'	Report	Haltvik (yellow card) 50'; H. Aleesami (yellow card) 66' (yellow-red card) 80'	Stadium: Brann Stadion; Attendance: 14,230; Referee: Svein Tore Sinnes

30 August 2024 21	KFUM Oslo	2–0	Lillestrøm	Oslo
19:00 CEST (UTC+2)	Rasch (yellow card) 4' (goal) 65' (pen.); Nuñez 88'	Report	Charles (yellow card) 23'; Vá (yellow card) 45' (yellow-red card) 63'; Elkær (yellow card) 74'	Stadium: KFUM Arena; Attendance: 3,216; Referee: Rohit Saggi

14 September 2024 22	Viking	1–0	KFUM Oslo	Stavanger
16:00 CEST (UTC+2)	Stensness (yellow card) 18'; Lion Njie 39' (o.g.); Tripic (yellow card) 40'; Bell (yellow card) 41'; Heggheim (yellow card) 90+4'	Report	H. Aleesami (yellow card) 16'; Svindland (yellow card) 25'; M. Njie (yellow card) 29'; A. Aleesami (yellow card) 33'; Sandal (yellow card) 70'; Nuñez (yellow card) 90+1'	Stadium: SR-Bank Arena; Attendance: 10,099; Referee: Mohammad Usman Aslam

23 September 2024 23	KFUM Oslo	1–1	Molde	Oslo
19:00 CEST (UTC+2)	Nouri 79'	Report	Brynhildsen 80'	Stadium: KFUM Arena; Attendance: 2,827; Referee: Marius Lien

29 September 2024 24	Odd	1–3	KFUM Oslo	Skien
17:00 CEST (UTC+2)	Bang-Kittilsen 16'; Ruud (yellow card) 40'	Report	Njie 26'; Rasch 42'; Nuñez 73'; Nouri (yellow card) 79'	Stadium: Skagerak Arena; Attendance: 4,743; Referee: Christian Moen

20 October 2024 25	KFUM Oslo	0–0	Haugesund	Oslo
17:00 CEST (UTC+2)	Svindland (yellow card) 62'	Report		Stadium: KFUM Arena; Attendance: 1,930; Referee: Mathias Støfringshaug

27 October 2024 26	Sandefjord	2–1	KFUM Oslo	Sandefjord
17:00 CET (UTC+1)	Gjone 76'; Amin 90'	Report	Okeke 37' (yellow card) 59'; Ndiaye (yellow card) 55'	Stadium: Jotun Arena; Attendance: 3,543; Referee: Sigurd Smehus Kringstad

3 November 2024 27	KFUM Oslo	1–2	Sarpsborg 08	Oslo
17:00 CET (UTC+1)	Tebo 31' (o.g.); Okeke (yellow card) 48'; Njie (yellow card) 70'	Report	Johansen 72' (pen.); Sher (yellow card) 75'; Tebo 81'	Stadium: KFUM Arena; Attendance: 1,764; Referee: Marius Lien

10 November 2024 28	Strømsgodset	1–0	KFUM Oslo	Drammen
17:00 CET (UTC+1)	Vilsvik (yellow card) 29'; Möller 58'	Report	Hoseth (yellow card) 85'	Stadium: Marienlyst Stadion; Attendance: 4,418; Referee: Svein Tore Sinnes

23 November 2024 29	KFUM Oslo	1–2	Kristiansund	Oslo
17:00 CET (UTC+1)	Ndiaye 79'	Report	Mikaelsson 10'; Isaksen 59'; Lansing (yellow card) 70'	Stadium: KFUM Arena; Attendance: 2,348; Referee: Daniel Higraff

1 December 2024 30	HamKam	0–2	KFUM Oslo	Hamar
17:00 CET (UTC+1)	Sjølstad (yellow card) 16'; Sørås (yellow card) 23'; Mares (red card) 55'; Kirkevold (yellow card) 76'; Bjarnason (yellow card) 90'	Report	Hestnes 24'; Hoseth 49'	Stadium: Briskeby Stadion; Attendance: 2,508; Referee: Sivert Øksnes Amland

=== Norwegian Football Cup ===
10 April 2024 First round	Årvoll	0–2	KFUM Oslo	Oslo
18:00 CEST (UTC+2)		Report	Harrison (yellow card) 14'; Nuñez 35'; Haltvik 60'; Hadzic (yellow card) 61'	Stadium: Årvoll kunstgress Referee: Ajdin Medic

24 April 2024 Second round	Frigg	0–3	KFUM Oslo	Oslo
18:00 CEST (UTC+2)	Rio-Moe (yellow card) 24'; Barane (yellow card) 46'	Report	Hickson 5', 78'; Saldana (yellow card) 47'; Ndiaye 53'; Hadzic (yellow card) 57'	Stadium: Tørteberg kunstgress Attendance: 290; Referee: Herman Leiulfsrud Aass

1 May 2024 Third round	Sogndal	1–1 (a.e.t.) (4–5 p)	KFUM Oslo	Sogndal
14:30 CEST (UTC+2)	Høyland (yellow card) 64'; Stavø 72'	Report	Rasch 89'; Harrison (yellow card) 99'	Stadium: Fosshaugane Campus; Attendance: 1,706; Referee: Steinar Hauge
	Penalties
	Arrocha (penalty scored); Flo (penalty scored); Høyland (penalty missed); Stavø (penalty scored); Hoven (penalty scored)		(penalty scored) Rasch; (penalty scored) Hestnes; (penalty scored) Nosa Dahl; (penalty scored) Hadzic; (penalty scored) Nuñez

8 May 2024 Fourth round	Lysekloster	2–3 (a.e.t.)	KFUM Oslo	Lysefjorden
18:00 CEST (UTC+2)	Bolsø 71'; Håbestad 87'; Kvarven (yellow card) 93'; Gamachis (yellow card) 119'	Report	Rasch 31' (pen.); Svindland (yellow card) 45'; Nosa Dahl 90+4'; Hestnes 115'	Stadium: Lysekloster Family Arena; Attendance: 700; Referee: Daniel Higraff

6 October 2024 Quarter-finals	Stabæk	2–3	KFUM Oslo	Bærum
18:00 CEST (UTC+2)	Wendt 40'; Diabaté 48'	Report	Nuñez 25'; H. Aleesami (yellow card) 31'; Njie (yellow card) 45+2' (goal) 65'; Ak. Aleesami 57'	Stadium: Nadderud Stadion; Attendance: 2,120; Referee: Mohammad Usman Aslam

30 October 2024 Semi-finals	Fredrikstad	0–0 (a.e.t.) (6–5 p)	KFUM Oslo	Fredrikstad
20:30 CET (UTC+1)	Fall (yellow card) 45+3'; Bjartalíð (yellow card) 48'	Report		Stadium: Fredrikstad Stadion; Attendance: 10,564; Referee: Kristoffer Hagenes
	Penalties
	Bjørlo (penalty scored); Kjelsrud Johansen (penalty missed); Bjartalíð (penalty scored); Hendriksson (penalty scored); Rafn (penalty scored); Magnússon (penalty scored); Kjær (penalty scored)		(penalty missed) Ndiaye; (penalty scored) Hestnes; (penalty scored) Aleesami; (penalty scored) Sandal; (penalty scored) Nuñez; (penalty scored) Okeke; (penalty missed) Akinyemi
