= 2015 Northeast Conference men's soccer season =

Northeast Conference
- Season: 2015
- Champions: LIU Brooklyn
- NEC tournament Champions: LIU Brooklyn
- NCAA tournament: LIU Brooklyn
- Matches: 28
- Goals: 76 (2.71 per match)
- Top goalscorer: Mario Mastrangelo, SFU (7 goals)
- Longest unbeaten run: 7 games, LIU
- Average attendance: 228

2015 Northeast Conference men's soccer standings
	Conf.					Overall
Team	W		L		T	W		L		T
LIU Brooklyn ‡	7	–	0	–	0	11	–	5	–	5
Saint Francis (PA)	5	–	2	–	0	11	–	5	–	4
Robert Morris	4	–	2	–	1	10	–	8	–	1
St. Francis Brooklyn	3	–	2	–	2	10	–	3	–	5
Central Connecticut	3	–	4	–	0	6	–	9	–	2
Bryant	1	–	3	–	3	3	–	8	–	5
Sacred Heart	1	–	6	–	0	2	–	12	–	1
Fairleigh Dickinson	0	–	5	–	2	2	–	12	–	3
‡-Tournament champion + - Invited to the NCAA Division I Men's Soccer Championship; As of November 20, 2015; Rankings from NSCAA

The 2015 Northeast Conference men's soccer season was the 35th season of men's varsity soccer in the conference.

The Saint Francis Red Flash are the defending regular season champions, while the St. Francis Brooklyn Terriers are the defending tournament champions.

LIU Brooklyn won the Regular Season Championship by going 7-0-0 in conference play and won the NEC tournament Championship by defeating St. Francis Brooklyn and Saint Francis (PA). Both tournament games were decided by penalty kicks. The NEC tournament was held in Brooklyn, NY at LIU Field.

== Changes from 2014 ==
- None

== Teams ==
Team	Location	Stadium	Capacity	Head coach
Bryant Bulldogs	Smithfield, Rhode Island	Bulldog Stadium	5,500	Seamus Purcell
Central Connecticut Blue Devils	New Britain, Connecticut	CCSU Soccer Field	550	Shaun Green
Fairleigh Dickinson Knights	Florham Park, New Jersey	FDU Stadium	500	Seth Roland
LIU Brooklyn Blackbirds	Brooklyn, New York	LIU Field	400	TJ Kostecky
Robert Morris Colonials	Moon Township, Pennsylvania	North Athletic Complex	800	Bill Denniston
Sacred Heart Pioneers	Fairfield, Connecticut	Campus Field	3,334	Joe Barroso
St. Francis Brooklyn Terriers	Brooklyn, New York	Brooklyn Bridge Park, Pier 5	300	Tom Giovatto
Saint Francis Red Flash	Loretto, Pennsylvania	DeGol Field	500	Paulo Neto

Notes:

- All records, appearances, titles, etc. are from time with current school only.
- Year at school includes 2015 season.
- Overall and NEC records are from time at current school and are before the beginning of the season.

== Regular season ==
=== Rankings ===
Legend
Increase in ranking
Decrease in ranking
Not ranked previous week

	Pre	Wk 2	Wk 3	Wk 4	Wk 5	Wk 6	Wk 7	Wk 8	Wk 9	Wk 10	Wk 11	Wk 12	Wk 13	Final
Bryant														
Central Connecticut														
Fairleigh Dickinson														
LIU Brooklyn														
Robert Morris														
Sacred Heart														
St. Francis Brooklyn				RV	RV	22	RV	RV	RV	RV	RV			
Saint Francis (PA)														

=== Results ===
Team/opponent	BRY	CCS	FDU	LIU	RMU	SHU	SFBK	SFU
Bryant Bulldogs		2–3	1–1 (2OT)	0–1	1–1 (2OT)	3–0	0–0 (2OT)	0–1
Central Connecticut Blue Devils	3–2		2–1	0–3	1–2	2–1	0–1 (OT)	1–3
Fairleigh Dickinson Knights	1–1 (2OT)	1–2		2–3	1–2	1–2	1–1 (2OT)	0–5
LIU Brooklyn Blackbirds	1–0	3–0	3–2		1–0	3–1	1–0	1–0 (OT)
Robert Morris Colonials	1–1 (2OT)	2–1	2–1	0–1		3–0	1–0 (2OT)	0–1
Sacred Heart Pioneers	0–3	1–2	2–1	1–3	0–3		0–3	1–6
St. Francis Brooklyn Terriers	0–0 (2OT)	1–0 (OT)	1–1 (2OT)	0–1	0–1 (2OT)	3–0		5–0
Saint Francis Red Flash	1–0	3–1	5–0	0–1 (OT)	1–0	6–1	0–5	

=== All-NEC awards and teams ===
2015 NEC Men's Soccer Individual Awards
Award	Recipient(s)
Player of the Year	Neco Brett, Robert Morris
Coach of the Year	TJ Kostecky, LIU Brooklyn
Defensive Player of the Year	Francis de Vries, St. Francis (PA)
Rookie of the Year	Rasmus Hansen, LIU Brooklyn

2015 NEC Men's Soccer All-Conference Teams
First Team	Second Team	Rookie Team
Neco Brett, Sr., FD, RMU; Mario Mastrangelo, Fr., FD, SFU; Simen Hestnes, Fr., MF., LIU; Rasmus Hansen, Fr., MF, LIU; Vincent Bezecourt, So., MF, SFBK; Harry Odell, Sr., MF, SFBK; Pablo Medina, R-Sr., MF, SFU; Tanner Sica, Sr., DF, LIU; Francis de Vries, Sr., DF, SFU; Cyril Coisne, Sr., DF, SFBK; Jack Binks, Sr., GK, SFBK	Ryan Taylor, So., FD, CCSU; Louis Beddouri, Fr., FD, CCSU; Brett Larocque, Sr., MF., BRYANT; Zach Zurita, Sr., MF, CCSU; Christian Dietrich, Jr., MF, FDU; Lucas Puntillo, Fr., MF, RMU; Keane McIvor, So., MF, RMU; Ben Knight, Sr., DF, CCSU; Bennett Jull, R-Jr., DF, RMU; Paul Galimi, Jr., DF, SFBK; Logan Keys, R-Jr., GK, LIU	Louis Beddouri, Fr., FD, CCSU; Zac Sherman, Fr., FD, LIU; Mario Mastrangelo, Fr., FD, LIU; Romario Guscott, R-Fr., FD, LIU; Simen Hestnes, Fr., MF., LIU; Rasmus Hansen, Fr., MF, LIU; Lucas Puntillo, Fr., MF, RMU; Tommy De Andrade, Fr., MF, SFBK; Filip Nordström, Fr., DF, LIU; Erik Wahlin, Fr., DF, LIU

== Postseason ==
=== NEC tournament ===
Semifinals; Friday, November 13
1	LIU Brooklyn	1^{†}
4	St. Francis Brooklyn	1
2	Saint Francis (PA)	2
3	Robert Morris	1

Final; Sunday, November 15
1	LIU Brooklyn	2^{#}
2	Saint Francis (PA)	2

- (†) The LIU-SFBK game was tied 1–1 after double overtime and LIU won on penalty kicks 4–3.
- (#) The LIU-SFU game was tied 2–2 after double overtime and LIU won on penalty kicks 3–1.

=== NCAA tournament ===
Seed	Region	School	1st round	2nd round	3rd round	Quarterfinals	Semifinals	Championship
	2	LIU Brooklyn	L, 1–1 (PK, 2–3) vs. Rutgers					
