= Hudl =

American video hosting company

Agile Sports Technologies, Inc.
- Type: Private
- Industry: Video hosting service
- Founded: 2006; 20 years ago
- Founders: David Graff, Brian Kaiser, John Wirtz
- Headquarters: Lincoln, Nebraska, United States
- Website: hudl.com

Hudl is a product and service of Agile Sports Technologies, Inc., a Lincoln, Nebraska based company providing tools for coaches and athletes to review game footage and improve team play. Its initial product line served college and professional American football teams; today the company provides video services to youth, amateur, and professional teams in American football as well as other sports including soccer, basketball, volleyball and lacrosse.

Founded in 2006, the company is based in Lincoln's historic Haymarket District. Initially the company sourced talent from the University of Nebraska–Lincoln, including the Jeffrey S. Raikes School; today the company has employees across a number of states in America and internationally, with office locations in London and Sydney.

In August 2013, according to Inc. Magazine, Hudl was the 149th fastest growing private company in the United States, and the fastest-growing private company in Nebraska. Hudl was the fastest growing private company in Nebraska again in 2014. By 2015, Hudl grew to 230 employees across four offices as it took on its first round of institutional funding in April with $72.5 million from Accel Partners.

Hudl made Fast Company's list of Most Innovative Companies in 2016. In July 2017, Hudl announced an additional round of funding totaling $30 million, led by existing investors Accel Partners, Jeff and Tricia Raikes, and Nelnet. In May 2020, Hudl received funding from Bain Capital.

== Headquarters ==
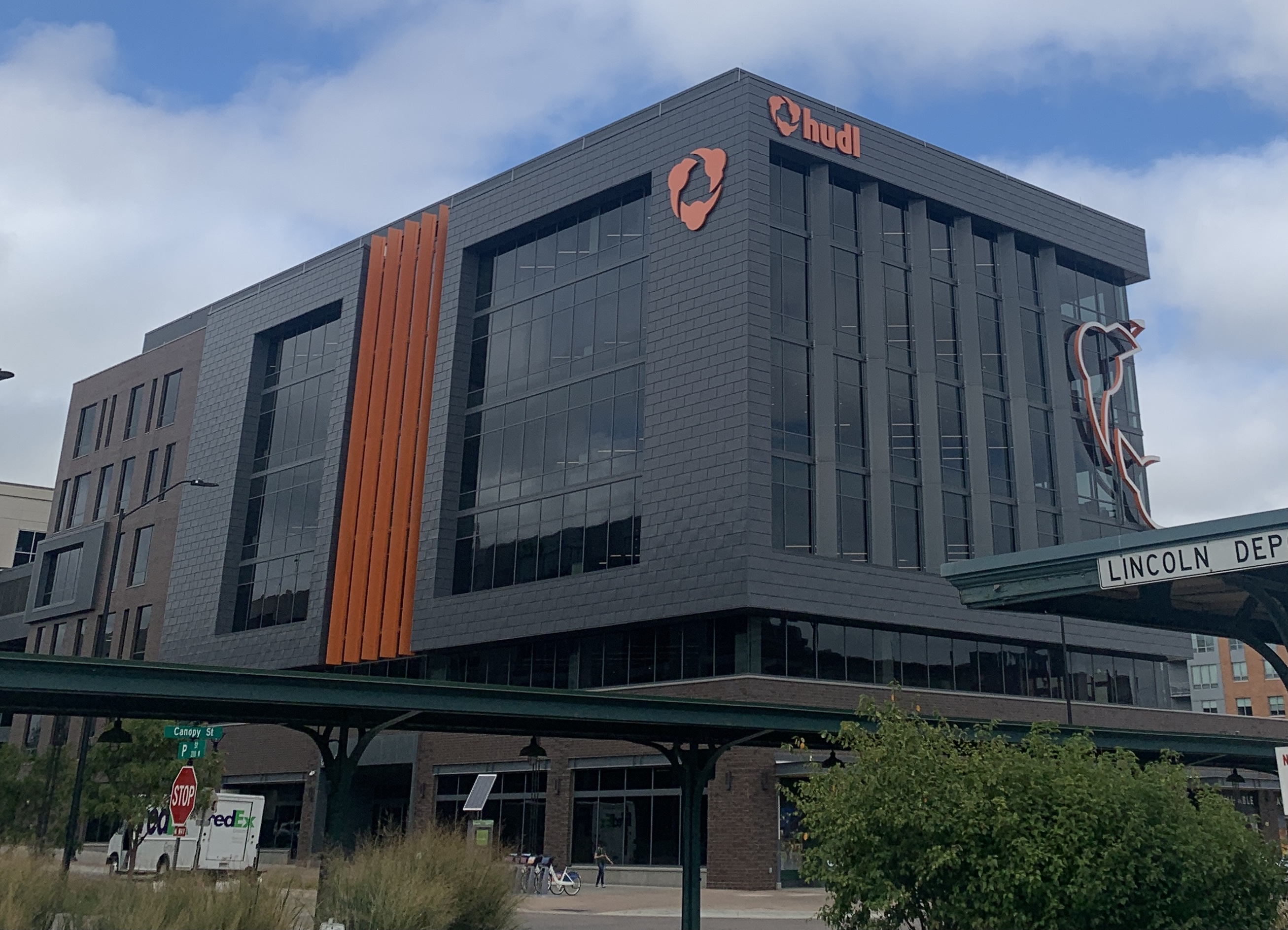
Hudl headquarters in Lincoln, Nebraska

In April 2015, Hudl announced plans to build a new global headquarters in Lincoln's historic Haymarket, where it has leased office space since shortly after its founding. The new building, completed in November 2017, is near Lincoln's Pinnacle Bank Arena and Railyard entertainment district, and is one of the largest office buildings constructed in downtown Lincoln since 2006.

== Acquisitions ==
Hudl has acquired several of its largest competitors, as well as companies that offer complementary services to its high school sports video offering. In July 2011, Hudl acquired Digital Sports Video (DSV), which at the time was the company's primary competitor. A year later, in June 2012, Hudl again acquired its next largest competitor in APEX Sports Software of Lower Burwell, Pennsylvania.

In 2014, Hudl made moves into the international soccer market with its acquisition of Replay Analysis, while committing to open a London office, where Replay Analysis was based. Shortly thereafter, in September 2014, Hudl acquired Ubersense of Boston, Massachusetts, which specialized in slow-motion performance capture for athletes from recreational to Olympic and professional levels.

Less than a year later in the summer of 2015, Hudl acquired Sportstec, an Australian-based sports performance analysis company that served elite professional teams around the world. Following the acquisition Hudl relocated Sportstec's existing Warriewood office to Sydney's central business district.

VolleyMetrics, a leader in volleyball analytics and video exchange based out of Provo, Utah, was acquired by Hudl in late 2017.

In May 2019, Hudl acquired one of its largest competitors, Krossover.

On August 19, 2019, Hudl acquired Wyscout.

In May 2022, Hudl announced that they had acquired Spanish wearable human performance measuring technology company, Realtrack Systems.

In June 2025, Hudl acquired Titan Sports, a Texas-based leader in wearable GPS player tracking.
