= 2017 Big East Conference men's soccer season =

- League: NCAA Division I
- Sport: Soccer
- Duration: August 25, 2017 – November 1, 2017
- Teams: 10

2018 MLS SuperDraft
- Top draft pick: Eric Dick, Butler
- Picked by: Sporting Kansas City, 13th overall

Regular Season
- Season champions: Butler
- Runners-up: Georgetown
- Season MVP: FW: Brandon Guhl, Butler; MF: Ricky Lopez-Espin, Creighton; DF: David Enstrom, St. John's; GK: Erick Dick, Butler

Tournament
- Champions: Georgetown
- Runners-up: Xavier

Big East men's soccer seasons
- ← 2016 2018 →

2017 Big East Conference men's soccer standings
	Conf.					Overall
Team	W		L		T	W		L		T
No. 12 Butler +	8	–	1	–	0	14	–	5	–	2
No. 16 Georgetown ‡	6	–	2	–	1	14	–	4	–	2
Saint John's	5	–	2	–	2	9	–	7	–	3
Xavier	5	–	4	–	0	11	–	6	–	3
Providence	2	–	2	–	5	5	–	8	–	5
Creighton	3	–	4	–	2	9	–	7	–	2
Marquette	3	–	5	–	1	3	–	11	–	2
Seton Hall	3	–	6	–	0	6	–	10	–	1
DePaul	2	–	6	–	1	5	–	11	–	2
Villanova	2	–	7	–	0	7	–	11	–	0
‡ – 2017 Big East Tournament champion + – Invited to the 2017 NCAA Division I Men's Soccer Championship; As of December 13, 2017; Rankings from United Soccer Coaches

The 2017 Big East Conference men's soccer season was the fifth season for the newly realigned Big East Conference. Including the history of the original Big East Conference, this was the 22nd season of men's soccer under the "Big East Conference" name.

The regular season began on August 25, 2017 and concluded on November 1, 2017. Butler won the regular season title. The 2017 Big East Conference Men's Soccer Tournament to decide the Big East champion, and the conference's automatic berth to the 2017 NCAA Division I Men's Soccer Championship began on November 4, 2017 and concluded with the championship match on November 12, 2017. Georgetown defeated Xavier in the championship game, 2–1, on a golden goal by Declan McCabe.

Butler and Georgetown both qualified for the 2017 NCAA Division I Men's Soccer Tournament. Georgetown entered as an automatic berth, while Butler had an at-large berth. Georgetown was eliminated in the first round by SMU, while Butler reached the round of 16 before losing to Wake Forest.

== Background ==
=== Head coaches ===
Team	Head coach	Previous job	Years at school	Overall record	Record at school	Big East record	NCAA Tournaments	NCAA College Cups	NCAA Titles
Butler	Paul Snape	Michigan (asst.)	7	52–40–20 (.554)	52–40–20 (.554)	18–16–2 (.528)	1	0	0
Creighton	Elmar Bolowich	North Carolina	7	375–173–52 (.668)	95–29–12 (.743)	23–10–3 (.681)	23	6	2
DePaul	Craig Blazer	U.S. national team (coordinator)	17	97–166–38 (.385)	97–166–38 (.385)	38–67–12 (.376)	1	0	0
Georgetown	Brian Wiese	Notre Dame (assistant)	12	118–61–25 (.640)	118–61–25 (.640)	58–32–7 (.634)	4	1	0
Marquette	Louis Bennett	Milwaukee	12	208–161–48 (.556)	73–97–31 (.440)	31–58–17 (.373)	7	0	0
Providence	Craig Stewart	Franklin Pierce	6	overall	55–35–11 (.599)				
Seton Hall	Gerson Echeverry	Seton Hall (asst.)	6						
St. John's	David Masur	Montclair State	27						
Villanova	Tom Carlin	Villanova (asst.)	10						
Xavier	Andy Fleming	Northwestern	8						

== Preseason ==
=== Recruiting ===
National Rankings
Team	CSN	TDS	Total Signees
Butler	NR	TDS	Total
Creighton	NR	TDS	Total
DePaul	NR	TDS	Total
Georgetown	8	TDS	Total
Marquette	NR	TDS	Total
Providence	NR	TDS	Total
Seton Hall	NR	TDS	Total
St. John's	NR	TDS	Total
Villanova	NR	TDS	Total
Xavier	NR	TDS	Total

=== Preseason poll ===
The preseason poll was released on August 16.

	Team ranking	First place votes	Raw points
1.	Providence	9	81
2.	Creighton	1	70
3.	Butler	0	68
4.	Villanova	0	52
5.	Georgetown	0	46
6.	Xavier	0	45
7.	Marquette	0	30
8.	St. John's	0	27
9.	DePaul	0	21
10.	Seton Hall	0	21

=== Preseason All-Conference Teams ===
All conference teams were announced in conjunction with the preseason poll on August 16, 2017.

Award	Recipient(s)
Preseason Offensive Player of the Year	Mac Steeves, Providence^{[a]}
Preseason Defensive Player of the Year	Cory Brown, Xavier^{[b]}
Preseason Goalkeeper of the Year	JT Marcinkowski, Georgetown^{[c]}
Preseason All-Big East XI^{[d]}	Ricky Lopez-Espin, Creighton
Preseason All-Big East XI^{[d]}	Mac Steeves, Providence
Preseason All-Big East XI^{[d]}	Harry Cooksley, St. John's^{[e]}
Preseason All-Big East XI^{[d]}	Lewis Suddick, Butler
Preseason All-Big East XI^{[d]}	Jared Timmer, Butler
Preseason All-Big East XI^{[d]}	Chris Lema, Georgetown
Preseason All-Big East XI^{[d]}	Luka Prpa, Marquette
Preseason All-Big East XI^{[d]}	Andreas Bartosinksi, Villanova
Preseason All-Big East XI^{[d]}	Lucas Stauffer, Creighton
Preseason All-Big East XI^{[d]}	Mark Jecewiz, Providence
Preseason All-Big East XI^{[d]}	Cory Brown, Xavier^{[e]}
Preseason All-Big East XI^{[d]}	JT Marcinkowski, Georgetown

== Regular season ==
=== Rankings ===
==== United Soccer Coaches National ====
Legend
Increase in ranking
Decrease in ranking
Not ranked previous week

		Pre	Wk 1	Wk 2	Wk 3	Wk 4	Wk 5	Wk 6	Wk 7	Wk 8	Wk 9	Wk 10	Wk 11	Wk 12	Final
Butler	C	25	17	21	RV	RV	22	15	20						
Creighton	C	14	23	RV	RV	NR	25	RV	NR						
DePaul	C														
Georgetown	C		RV	18	9	16	14	10	9						
Marquette	C														
Providence	C	12	RV	RV	NR										
Seton Hall	C														
St. John's	C														
Villanova	C														
Xavier	C					RV	NR								

==== United Soccer Coaches Great Lakes Regional ====
Legend
Increase in ranking
Decrease in ranking
Not ranked previous week

== Postseason ==
=== Big East Tournament ===
Semifinals
1	Butler	2 (1)
4	Xavier (pen.)	2 (4)
2	Georgetown	2
3	St. John's	1

Final
4	Xavier	1
2	Georgetown (2OT)	2

=== NCAA Tournament ===
Seed	Region	School	1st round	2nd round	3rd round	Quarterfinals	Semifinals	Championship
14	Chapel Hill	Georgetown	BYE	L 1–2^{2OT} vs. SMU – (Washington, D.C.)				
—N/a	Winston-Salem	Butler	W 2–0 vs. Lipscomb – (Indianapolis)	W 3–2 vs. #16 VCU – (Richmond)	L 0–2 vs. #1 Wake Forest – (Winston-Salem)			

== Awards ==
2017 B1G Men's Soccer Individual Awards
Award	Recipient(s)
Offensive Players of the Year	Brandon Guhl, So., Butler; Ricky Lopez-Espin, Sr., Creighton
Midfielder of the Year	Harry Cooksley, Sr., St. John's
Defensive Player of the Year	David Enstrom, Sr., St. John's
Goalkeeper of the Year	Eric Dick, RS-Sr., Butler
Coach of the Year	Paul Snape, Butler
Freshman of the Year	Derek Dodson, Fr., Georgetown

2017 B1G Men's Soccer All-Conference Teams
First Team	Second Team	Freshman Team
Forwards: Brandon Guhl, So., Butler‡ Ricky Lopez-Espin, Sr., Creighton‡ Mac Steeves, RS-Sr., Providence Midfielders: Harry Cooksley, Sr., St. John’s; Chris Lema, Sr., Georgetown; Lewis Suddick, So., Butler Defenders: Cory Brown, Sr., Xavier; David Enstrom, Sr., St. John’s; Brendan McDonough, Jr., Georgetown; Lucas Stauffer, Sr., Creighton Goalkeeper: Eric Dick, RS-Sr., Butler	Forwards: Derek Dodson, Fr., Georgetown; Declan McCabe, Sr., Georgetown; Matt Vasquenza, Sr., Xavier Midfielders: Andres Arcila, Jr., Seton Hall; Noah Franke, Sr., Creighton; Simen Hestnes, Jr., Xavier; Luka Prpa, So., Marquette Defenders: Shane Bradley, So., Villanova; Joe Moulden, Jr., Butler; Cameron Taylor, RS-Jr., Xavier Goalkeeper: JT Marcinkowski, Jr., Georgetown	Forwards: Matt DePerro, Providence; Derek Dodson, Georgetown‡ Jack Shearer, St. John’s‡ Midfielders: Jacob Montes, Georgetown‡ Kuba Polat, Creighton‡ Theo Quartey, Villanova; Istvan Wilhelms, DePaul Defenders: Samuel Buzzas, Xavier; Manuel Cukaj, Marquette; Sean O’Hearn, Georgetown Goalkeeper: Zach Nelson, Xavier

‡ unanimous selection

== Draft picks ==
Round	Pick #	MLS team	Player	Position	College	Other
1	13	Sporting Kansas City	(United States) Eric Dick	GK	Butler	
2	26	Vancouver Whitecaps	(United States) Lucas Stauffer	DF	Creighton	
2	33	Real Salt Lake	(United States) Ricky Lopez-Espin	FW	Creighton	
2	34	FC Dallas	(United States) Chris Lema	MF	Georgetown	
2	43	Houston Dynamo	(United States) Mac Steeves	FW	Providence	
3	62	Vancouver Whitecaps	(New Zealand) Cory Brown	DF	Xavier	
4	80	FC Dallas	(United States) Noah Franke	DF	Creighton	

=== Notable non-draft signees ===
The following are notable players who went pro following the end of the season that were not selected in the 2018 MLS SuperDraft.

Player	Position	College	Moving to	Acquired	Ref.
(England) Harry Cooksley	MF	St. John's	(Spain) Mallorca	Free transfer	
(United States) JT Marcinkowski	GK	Georgetown	(United States) San Jose Earthquakes	Homegrown player	

== See also ==
- 2017 NCAA Division I men's soccer season

== Notes ==
^{^[a]}Mac Steeves won the 2016 Big East Preseason Offensive Player of the Year Award.
^{^[b]}Cory Brown won the 2016 Big East Preseason Defensive Player of the Year Award.
^{^[c]}J. T. Marcinkowski won the 2016 Big East Preseason Goalkeeper of the Year Award.
^{^[d]}There are 12 players selected for the Big East All-Preseason XI due to a tie in voting.
^{^[e]}Denotes a player that was unanimously selected for the preseason team.
