= Martin Håheim-Elveseter =

Norwegian footballer (born 2005)

Personal information
- Date of birth: 29 December 2005 (age 20)
- Place of birth: Norway
- Position: Forward

Team information
- Current team: Hødd (on loan from Sarpsborg 08)
- Number: 15

Youth career
- –2021: Bergsøy
- 2021–2023: Hødd

Senior career*
Years	Team	Apps	(Gls)
2022–2024	Hødd	20	(5)
2024–	Sarpsborg 08	9	(0)
2025–2026	→ Egersund (loan)	21	(1)
2026–	→ Hødd (loan)	14	(4)

International career^{‡}
2024	Norway U19	2	(0)
2025–	Norway U20	7	(0)
- * Club domestic league appearances and goals as of 14 November 2026 ‡ National team caps and goals as of 13 October 2025

Martin Håheim-Elveseter (born 29 December 2005) is a Norwegian footballer who plays as a forward for Hødd, on loan from Sarpsborg 08.

He started his youth career in Bergsøy IL and joined IL Hødd in 2021. He made his senior debut in 2022, as Hødd won promotion, and also played in the 2023 1. divisjon. He became a regular player in 2024. Hødd eliminated Aalesund from the 2024 Norwegian Football Cup, and though Hødd lost to Molde, the 1–1 goal from Håheim-Elveseter caught attention.

By August 2024, Håheim-Elveseter had scored 5 goals in the 2024 2. divisjon where Hødd found themselves topping the table. There were reports of several larger clubs wanting to sign Håheim-Elveseter, with Sarpsborg 08 winning out. According to TV 2, it was the second highest transfer fee from the 2. divisjon, behind Jonathan Norbye.

Håheim-Elveseter was called up and made his debut for Norway U19 in 2024.
