= Tobias Hestad =

Norwegian footballer

Personal information
- Full name: Tobias Hestad
- Date of birth: 29 December 2000 (age 25)
- Height: 1.82 m (6 ft 0 in)
- Position: Left winger

Team information
- Current team: NSÍ Runavík
- Number: 9

Youth career
- –2017: Molde

Senior career*
Years	Team	Apps	(Gls)
2017–2022	Molde	0	(0)
2019	→ Asker (loan)	11	(3)
2020	→ Stjørdals-Blink (loan)	12	(1)
2021	→ Raufoss (loan)	5	(0)
2021	→ Hødd (loan)	4	(0)
2022–2024	Gjøvik-Lyn	50	(12)
2024–2025	Alta	29	(16)
2025	Jerv	11	(1)
2026–	NSÍ Runavík	19	(3)
- * Club domestic league appearances and goals as of 17:26, 1 November 2026 (UTC)

Tobias Hestad (born 29 December 2000) is a Norwegian professional footballer who plays as a left winger for Faroe Islands Premier League club NSÍ Runavík.

== Career ==
Hestad is the son of Daniel Berg Hestad and the grandson of Stein Olav Hestad, both of whom had long, successful careers at Molde FK. Tobias Hestad left the Molde youth setup for the senior team in 2017. He did not play any league matches, instead having four separate loan spells to domestic clubs. He left on a free transfer in 2022 and joined Gjøvik-Lyn, where he found regular playing time over two seasons.

Hestad joined third-tier side Alta in 2024 and scored seven goals in their opening cup match against Kirkenes. Hestad was the top scorer in the Norwegian Cup in 2024 with 8 goals, despite Alta's third round cup loss to Stabæk.

Hestad again performed strongly the cup for Alta in 2025, scoring seven goals against Bjørnevatn and one against second-tier outfit Skeid, before a defeat against Eliteserien team Kristiansund. Hestad scored 8 goals again during the cup run, which tied him for 3rd most in 2025.

Hestad's contract with Alta was terminated by mutual agreement in May 2025, despite then being the leading scorer of the cup. He joined Jerv three months later as a free agent.

== Career statistics ==
As of match played 31 October 2026

Appearances and goals by club, season and competition
Club	Season	League			National cup (Note: Includes Norwegian Cup, Faroe Islands Cup)		Other		Total	
Club	Season	Division	Apps	Goals	Apps	Goals	Apps	Goals	Apps	Goals
Molde	2019	Eliteserien	0	0	1	0	—		1	0
Asker (loan)	2019	Norwegian Second Division	11	3	0	0	—		11	3
Stjørdals-Blink (loan)	2020	Norwegian First Division	12	1	0	0	0	0	12	1
Raufoss (loan)	2021	Norwegian First Division	5	0	0	0	—		5	0
Hødd (loan)	2021	Norwegian Second Division	4	0	0	0	0	0	4	0
Gjøvik-Lyn	2022	Norwegian Second Division	25	5	2	0	—		27	5
Gjøvik-Lyn	2023	Norwegian Second Division	25	7	3	0	—		28	7
Gjøvik-Lyn	Total		50	12	5	0	—		55	12
Alta	2024	Norwegian Second Division	24	15	3	8	—		27	23
Alta	2025	Norwegian Second Division	5	1	2	8	—		7	9
Alta	Total		29	16	5	16	—		34	32
Jerv	2025	Norwegian Second Division	11	1	1	1	—		12	2
NSÍ Runavík	2026	Faroe Islands Premier League	19	3	4	4	5 (Note: Appearances in UEFA Conference League)	0	28	7
Career total			141	36	16	21	5	0	162	57

== Honours ==
NSÍ Runavík

- Faroe Islands Premier League: 2026
