= Wyscout =

Football analytics company

Coordinates: 44.31424°N 9.32309°E

Wyscout Spa
- Formerly: Sport Video Service Sas (2004–2007); Wisport Srl (2008–2009); Wi Srl (2009); Wy Srl (2009–2013)
- Type: SPA
- Industry: Football Scouting, Match Analysis, Football Transfers
- Founded: 2004; 22 years ago in Genoa, Italy
- Founders: Matteo Campodonico, Simone Falzetti, Pier Maria Saltamacchia
- Headquarters: Corso Colombo 7-9-11, Chiavari, Italy
- Area served: Worldwide
- Products: Wyscout Platform
- Services: Wyscout Forum
- Revenue: €13 million (2019)
- Owner: Hudl
- Number of employees: 80~ (2019)
- Website: wyscout.com

Wyscout is an Italian company specializing in football analytics. Founded in Genoa in 2004, it offers video analysis tools and databases to support scouting, match analysis, and player transfers.

The company provides in-depth data on player performance, team tactics, and match patterns for coaches, teams, and players.

== History ==
=== 2004–2010: Early years, B2B commercialization ===
During the years 2004–2010, the company business was about on demand Football Matches Analysis, WebTVs, Advertising, DVB-T TV broadcasting, and the Capello Index project.

In 2008, the Wyscout company, received capital for the business development from the local area (Chiavari) businessman Antonio Gozzi.

A very early version of the Wyscout Platform was released in March 2008. The company changed several names during the years 2004–2010 (Sport Video Service, Wisport, Wi, Wigroup, Wysport, WY, Wygroup) the final and current name of the company is Wyscout since May 2010.

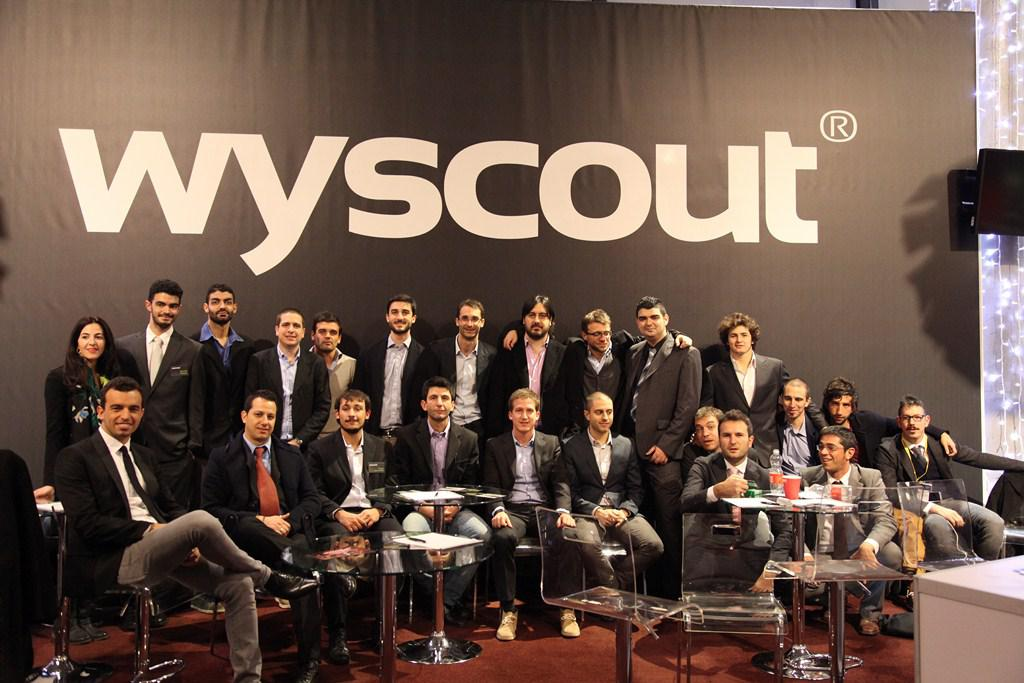
Wyscout Company Team as of December 2012

=== 2010–2018: Growth ===
In 2010, the company released a significant update to its primary product, Wyscout Platform 2, accessible via website and iOS. This version marked a turning point, significantly increasing the product's visibility within the football scouting industry. The following year, Wyscout hosted its inaugural football-focused event, the Wyscout Forum, in Milan, Italy.

In August 2012, former Italian Prime Minister Mario Monti praised Wyscout as a prime example of an Italian technology company, drawing comparisons to his observations during previous visits to Silicon Valley.

Since 2015 the style and the fonts of the Wyscout logo are used by the Wylab (a coworking space based in Chiavari, Italy) due an agreement; even if the two subjects are not related at all.

=== 2019: Acquired by Hudl ===
On 19 August 2019, Hudl acquired Wyscout.

== Products and services ==
=== Wyscout Platform ===
==== Early versions ====
The Wyscout Platform is a database centered around football player information. Initially launched online in March 2008 as "Wiscout" (version 0.1), it offered basic player statistics and DVD ordering services. By December 2008, the platform evolved (version 0.2) to include online streaming of requested matches through standalone HTML webpages. Further development led to the release of Wiscout Platform 0.3 in February 2009, enabling users to watch streamed matches directly within the Google Chrome browser. While this version marked a step towards in-platform streaming, the available match content was limited at the time.

==== Wiscout Platform ====
In Spring 2009, the company released Wiscout Platform 1.0 through customized Set-top boxes, it was possible to have access to the video database through an HDTV. In Spring 2010, the name of the product was changed in Wyscout Platform.

==== Wyscout Platform 2 ====
It was published online as a website on 5 March 2010. The GUI of this version was very different from the previous one, displaying flags of all the nations in the home page, and the submenus displayed lists of all the leagues, teams, and players of the selected country.

==== Wyscout Platform 3 ====
Wyscout Platform 3 was released on 5 March 2012, via website and as an iOS App.

==== Wyscout 4 ====
Wyscout 4 is available as a website since June 2014.

Wyscout 4, released in June 2014

=== Wyscout Forum ===
The Wyscout Forum is a B2B event where football agents, football clubs and players agencies deal together; it principally works as a hub of connection between them. The Wyscout Forum is generally held in the executive suites of football stadiums or hotels of global cities like London, Rio de Janeiro, Abu Dhabi, Barcelona, Moscow and Milan. The first Wyscout Forum took place in spring 2011. As of April 2014, there have been nine editions of the Wyscout Forum.

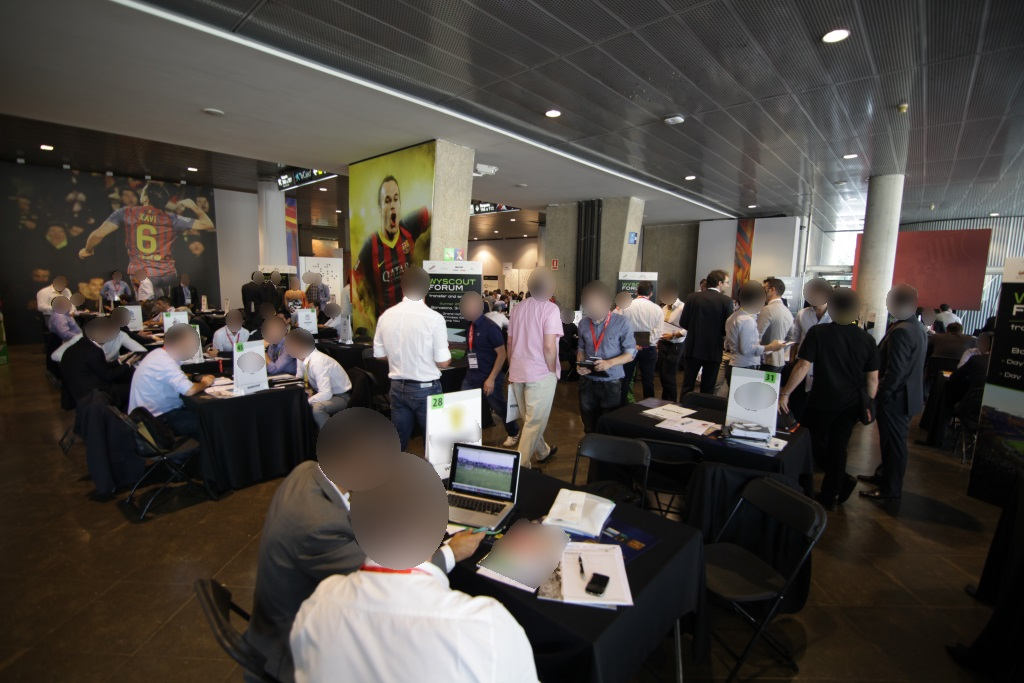
Wyscout Forum Summer 2013, Camp Nou Executive Suites, Barcelona

== Reception ==
In 2013, both The Guardian and The Independent wrote positively about the depth of Wyscout Platform's database. The Guardian also praised the possibility to spot potential skilled footballers using the online platform.
