= Dennis Gaustad =

Norwegian footballer (born 2004)

Personal information
- Full name: Dennis Bakke Gaustad
- Date of birth: 1 May 2004 (age 22)
- Position: Winger

Team information
- Current team: Aris Limassol
- Number: 29

Youth career
- –2018: Strindheim
- 2019: Trygg/Lade
- 2020–2022: Rosenborg

Senior career*
Years	Team	Apps	(Gls)
2021–2022	Rosenborg 2	46	(7)
2023–2025	Ranheim	32	(4)
2024–2025	→ Aris Limassol (loan)	14	(2)
2025–	Aris Limassol	21	(2)
- * Club domestic league appearances and goals as of 14 June 2026

Dennis Gaustad (born 1 May 2004) is a Norwegian footballer who plays as a winger for Aris Limassol FC.

== Career ==
Gaustad played youth football for Trondheim clubs Strindheim, Trygg/Lade and Rosenborg. He signed a contract with Rosenborg in January 2022, and made his first-team debut in the 2022 cup, but otherwise played for their B team in the Second and Third Division.

In January 2023, he started training with Ranheim, eventually signing for them. In the summer of 2024, he went to Cypriot team Aris Limassol FC on a loan with option to buy. In the summer of 2025, Aris chose to exercise the buying option, worth about 7 million kr.
