= Johannes Nuñez =

Norwegian footballer (born 1996)

Personal information
- Full name: Johannes Andres Hummelvoll-Nuñez Godoy
- Date of birth: 14 December 1996 (age 29)
- Place of birth: Holmlia, Oslo, Norway
- Height: 1.82 m (6 ft 0 in)
- Position: Forward

Team information
- Current team: Fredrikstad
- Number: 10

Youth career
- –2011: Holmlia
- 2012–2014: Lyn

Senior career*
| Years | Team | Apps | (Gls) |
| 2014 | Lyn | 8 | (0) |
| 2015–2016 | Ready | 45 | (19) |
| 2017–2019 | Skeid | 75 | (15) |
| 2020–2021 | Sandnes Ulf | 31 | (4) |
| 2021–2025 | KFUM Oslo | 100 | (34) |
| 2025– | Fredrikstad | 16 | (3) |
- * Club domestic league appearances and goals as of 31 October 2026

Johannes Andres Hummelvoll-Nuñez Godoy (born 14 December 1996) is a Norwegian professional footballer who plays as a forward for Fredrikstad in the Eliteserien.

== Club career ==
As a youth player, Nuñez was with his hometown club, Holmlia SK, and Lyn. He made his senior debut with then Oddsen-ligaen club Lyn in 2014.

Subsequently, he played for IF Ready in the Norsk Tipping-Ligaen, Skeid 2 in the 4. divisjon and Skeid in both the 2. divisjon and the 1. divisjon.

In December 2019, Nuñez signed with Sandnes Ulf. In July 2021, he switched to KFUM Oslo on a deal until the 2023 season.

After getting promotion to the Eliteserien and becoming the team top goalscorer with 10 goals in the 2023 season, Nuñez renewed with KFUM Oslo until the 2026 season.

== Personal life ==
His mother is Chilean, and while having expressed his interest, he has not been called-up to play for the Chile national team.

== Career statistics ==
As of 31 October 2026

Appearances and goals by club, season and competition
| Club | Season | League | | | National Cup | | Other | | Total | |
| Club | Season | Division | Apps | Goals | Apps | Goals | Apps | Goals | Apps | Goals |
|---|---|---|---|---|---|---|---|---|---|---|
| Lyn | 2014 | 2. divisjon | 8 | 0 | 0 | 0 | — | | 8 | 0 |
| Ready | 2015 | 3. divisjon | 20 | 4 | 1 | 0 | — | | 21 | 4 |
| Ready | 2016 | 3. divisjon | 25 | 15 | 1 | 0 | — | | 26 | 15 |
| Ready | Total | | 45 | 19 | 2 | 0 | — | | 47 | 19 |
| Skeid | 2017 | 2. divisjon | 24 | 4 | 1 | 0 | — | | 25 | 1 |
| Skeid | 2018 | 2. divisjon | 22 | 4 | 3 | 1 | — | | 25 | 5 |
| Skeid | 2019 | 1. divisjon | 29 | 7 | 3 | 1 | — | | 32 | 8 |
| Skeid | Total | | 75 | 15 | 7 | 2 | — | | 82 | 17 |
| Sandnes Ulf | 2020 | 1. divisjon | 25 | 4 | — | | — | | 25 | 4 |
| Sandnes Ulf | 2021 | 1. divisjon | 6 | 0 | 0 | 0 | — | | 6 | 0 |
| Sandnes Ulf | Total | | 31 | 4 | 0 | 0 | — | | 31 | 4 |
| KFUM Oslo | 2021 | 1. divisjon | 10 | 1 | 0 | 0 | 2 (Note: Appearances in 1. divisjon promotional play-offs) | 2 | 12 | 3 |
| KFUM Oslo | 2022 | 1. divisjon | 24 | 8 | 3 | 0 | 1 | 0 | 27 | 8 |
| KFUM Oslo | 2023 | 1. divisjon | 27 | 10 | 4 | 2 | — | | 31 | 12 |
| KFUM Oslo | 2024 | Eliteserien | 27 | 10 | 5 | 4 | — | | 32 | 14 |
| KFUM Oslo | 2025 | Eliteserien | 12 | 5 | 3 | 2 | — | | 15 | 7 |
| KFUM Oslo | Total | | 100 | 34 | 15 | 8 | 3 | 2 | 117 | 44 |
| Fredrikstad | 2025 | Eliteserien | 4 | 2 | 0 | 0 | 2 (Note: Appearances in UEFA Conference League) | 0 | 6 | 2 |
| Fredrikstad | 2026 | Eliteserien | 12 | 1 | 5 | 2 | — | | 17 | 3 |
| Fredrikstad | Total | | 16 | 3 | 5 | 2 | 2 | 0 | 23 | 5 |
| Career total | | | 275 | 75 | 29 | 12 | 5 | 2 | 309 | 89 |
