= Simen Hestnes =

Norwegian footballer (born 1996)

Personal information
- Date of birth: 5 February 1996 (age 30)
- Height: 1.84 m (6 ft 0 in)
- Position: Midfielder

Team information
- Current team: Häcken
- Number: 8

Youth career
- 2012–2015: Vålerenga

College career
Years	Team	Apps	(Gls)
2015–2016	LIU Brooklyn Blackbirds		
2017–2018	Xavier Musketeers	39	(15)

Senior career*
Years	Team	Apps	(Gls)
2017	Brooklyn Italians		
2019–2021	Skeid	38	(4)
2022–2026	KFUM	126	(16)
2026–	Häcken	5	(0)
- * Club domestic league appearances and goals as of 15 August 2026

Simen Hestnes (born 5 February 1996) is a Norwegian footballer who plays as a midfielder for Häcken in Allsvenskan.

== Career ==
Hestnes hails from Oslo and is a son of a volleyball player. He joined the youth section of Vålerenga Fotball and attended the Wang elite sports school. In April 2015 he made his senior debut for Vålerenga, playing in the 2015 Norwegian Football Cup first round against Lokomotiv Oslo. He left during the summer to attend LIU Brooklyn and play for the LIU Brooklyn Blackbirds. In the 2015 Northeast Conference season he made the All-Conference Team, and in the 2016 Northeast Conference season he made the All-Conference Team again and was awarded Player of the Year. Hestnes also played for the Brooklyn Italians during the 2017 NPSL season before changing college to the Xavier University and the Xavier Musketeers men's soccer team. During the 2017 Big East Conference season he made the All-Conference Second Team. Describing himself as snotty and immature before he left for the US, Hestnes also admitted that he was a "baron of the nightlife" during his stay. An agent talked about FC Cincinnati wanting to acquire Hestnes in the MLS Draft, which did not happen.

After graduating from Xavier University, Hestnes returned to Norway in the summer of 2019 and joined struggling 1. divisjon team Skeid. Despite his 2 goals in 4 games, Skeid were relegated, but he was a part of the team that won re-promotion from the 2020 2. divisjon. After the 2021 season, Hestnes left Skeid for another Oslo club at the second tier, KFUM.

Hestnes soon formed a midfield duo with Robin Rasch. In the 2023 1. divisjon, KFUM managed to win promotion to Eliteserien, a level the club had never before managed to reach. After winning promotion Hestnes extended his contract to 2026. In April 2024 he was in the starting eleven for KFUM's debut in Eliteserien. He scored his first Eliteserien goal in the same month against Strømsgodset.

On 16 June 2026, Hestnes moved abroad to play for Allsvenskan club BK Häcken.
