= Petter Nosa Dahl =

Norwegian footballer (born 2003)

Personal information
- Full name: Petter Nosakhare Dahl
- Date of birth: 22 October 2003 (age 23)
- Place of birth: Oslo, Norway
- Height: 1.80 m (5 ft 11 in)
- Position: Winger

Team information
- Current team: Rapid Wien
- Number: 10

Youth career
- –2017: Frigg
- 2018–2020: Lyn

Senior career*
Years	Team	Apps	(Gls)
2021	Frigg	13	(5)
2022	KFUM	28	(6)
2023–2024	Bodø/Glimt	0	(0)
2023	→ KFUM (loan)	13	(0)
2024	→ KFUM (loan)	15	(5)
2024–2025	Mechelen	22	(1)
2025–	Rapid Wien	30	(8)

International career
2023	Norway U20	1	(1)
2023	Norway U21	2	(0)
- * Club domestic league appearances and goals as of 24 October 2026

Petter Nosakhare Dahl (born 23 October 2003) is a Norwegian footballer who plays as a winger for Rapid Wien.

== Early life ==
Nosakhare Dahl was born on 23 October 2001 in Norway. He was born to a Nigerian mother and a Norwegian father. He is a native of Oslo, Norway.

== Career ==
Nosakhare Dahl started his career with Norwegian side Frigg Oslo FK, having played youth football for Frigg and Lyn. He joined KFUM in 2022, and made his breakthrough in the 2022 1. divisjon. In March 2023, he was bought by FK Bodø/Glimt, who would immediately loan him back to KFUM until the summer of 2023. He was not able to retain the starting place he had had in KFUM in 2022, and was benched several times. When returning to Bodø/Glimt after his loan was over, he did play a single game. In 2024, he therefore returned to KFUM on loan, where he finally made his Eliteserien debut. The loan was originally meant to last throughout entire 2024. In the summer 2024, Bodø/Glimt instead chose to sell Dahl to Belgian side Mechelen. On 26 July 2024, he debuted for the club against Club Brugge in Mechelen's opening game of the league season, and two minutes after coming on as substitute had provided an assist for Patrick Pflücke to equalise in a 1–1 draw.

== Style of play ==
Nosakhare Dahl mainly operates as a winger. He can operate as a left-winger and right-winger. Fansite www.allnigeriasoccer.com described him in 2024 as an "attacking player with a good 1v1 action".

== Career statistics ==
As of 27 October 2026

Appearances and goals by club, season and competition
Club	Season	League			National cup		Continental		Other		Total	
Club	Season	Division	Apps	Goals	Apps	Goals	Apps	Goals	Apps	Goals	Apps	Goals
Frigg	2021	3. divisjon	13	5	1	0	—		—		14	5
KFUM Oslo	2022	1. divisjon	28	6	4	0	—		1 (Note: Appearance in Eliteserien play-offs)	0	33	6
Bodø/Glimt	2023	Eliteserien	0	0	0	0	—		—		0	0
KFUM Oslo (loan)	2023	1. divisjon	13	0	4	1	—		—		17	1
KFUM Oslo (loan)	2024	Eliteserien	15	5	2	2	—		—		17	7
Mechelen	2024–25	Belgian Pro League	22	1	1	0	—		—		23	1
Rapid Wien	2025–26	Austrian Bundesliga	20	3	1	0	7 (Note: Appearances in UEFA Conference League)	2	—		28	5
Rapid Wien	2026–27	Austrian Bundesliga	10	5	3	0	6	1	—		19	6
Rapid Wien	Total		30	8	4	0	13	3	—		47	11
Career total			121	25	16	3	13	3	1	0	151	31

== Honours ==
Individual

- Norwegian First Division Young Player of the Month: August 2022
- Eliteserien Young Player of the Month: May 2024
