= Andreas Hoven =

Norwegian footballer (born 1998)

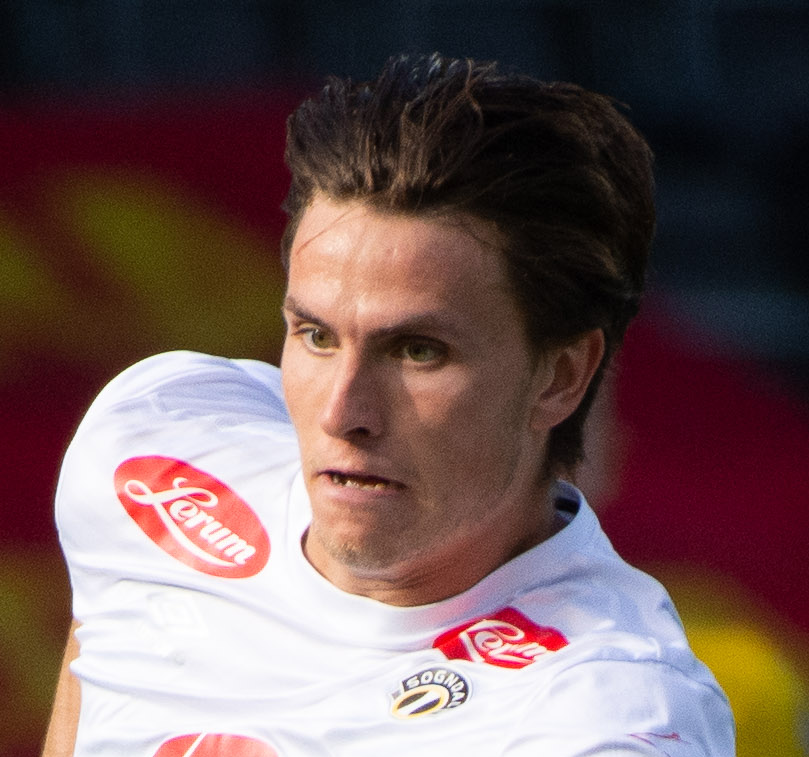
- From the match between Sogndal and Raufoss on 31 July 2020

Personal information
- Full name: Andreas Hoven
- Date of birth: 20 February 1998 (age 28)
- Place of birth: Norway
- Height: 1.84 m (6 ft 0 in)
- Position: Winger

Team information
- Current team: Stabæk
- Number: 16

Youth career
- –2016: Strømsgodset

Senior career*
| Years | Team | Apps | (Gls) |
| 2016–2019 | Strømsgodset | 7 | (0) |
| 2018 | → Notodden (loan) | 12 | (0) |
| 2019 | → Nest-Sotra (loan) | 7 | (0) |
| 2019–2024 | Sogndal | 129 | (9) |
| 2024– | Stabæk | 30 | (2) |

International career
| 2013 | Norway U15 | 4 | (1) |
| 2016 | Norway U18 | 4 | (1) |
| 2017 | Norway U19 | 6 | (0) |
| 2018 | Norway U21 | 5 | (0) |
- * Club domestic league appearances and goals as of 14 November 2026

Andreas Hoven (born 20 February 1998) is a Norwegian football player who plays as midfielder for Stabæk.

He is a son of the track and field athletes Anders Hoven and Anne-Beth Hoven, and together with his brother Kristoffer Hoven he signed for Strømsgodset's first team in 2016.

== Career statistics ==
=== Club ===
As of 14 November 2026

Appearances and goals by club, season and competition
| Club | Season | League | | | National Cup | | Other | | Total | |
| Club | Season | Division | Apps | Goals | Apps | Goals | Apps | Goals | Apps | Goals |
|---|---|---|---|---|---|---|---|---|---|---|
| Strømsgodset | 2016 | Eliteserien | 1 | 0 | — | | — | | 1 | 0 |
| Strømsgodset | 2017 | Eliteserien | 4 | 0 | — | | — | | 4 | 0 |
| Strømsgodset | 2018 | Eliteserien | 2 | 0 | — | | — | | 2 | 0 |
| Strømsgodset | Total | | 7 | 0 | — | | — | | 7 | 0 |
| Notodden (loan) | 2018 | 1. divisjon | 12 | 0 | 1 | 0 | — | | 13 | 0 |
| Nest-Sotra (loan) | 2019 | 1. divisjon | 7 | 0 | 0 | 0 | — | | 7 | 0 |
| Sogndal | 2019 | 1. divisjon | 15 | 2 | — | | — | | 15 | 2 |
| Sogndal | 2020 | 1. divisjon | 19 | 1 | — | | 0 | 0 | 19 | 1 |
| Sogndal | 2021 | 1. divisjon | 26 | 1 | 1 | 0 | — | | 27 | 1 |
| Sogndal | 2022 | 1. divisjon | 27 | 2 | 2 | 0 | — | | 29 | 2 |
| Sogndal | 2023 | 1. divisjon | 30 | 3 | 2 | 0 | — | | 32 | 3 |
| Sogndal | 2024 | 1. divisjon | 14 | 0 | 1 | 0 | — | | 15 | 0 |
| Sogndal | Total | | 131 | 9 | 6 | 0 | 0 | 0 | 137 | 9 |
| Stabæk | 2024 | 1. divisjon | 6 | 0 | — | | — | | 6 | 0 |
| Stabæk | 2025 | 1. divisjon | 0 | 0 | 1 | 0 | — | | 1 | 0 |
| Stabæk | 2026 | 1. divisjon | 24 | 2 | 3 | 0 | — | | 27 | 2 |
| Stabæk | Total | | 30 | 2 | 4 | 0 | 0 | 0 | 34 | 2 |
| Career Total | | | 190 | 11 | 11 | 0 | 0 | 0 | 201 | 11 |
