= Martin Høyland =

Norwegian footballer (born 1995)

Personal information
- Date of birth: 17 September 1995 (age 31)
- Place of birth: Kristiansand, Norway
- Height: 1.85 m (6 ft 1 in)
- Position: Midfielder

Team information
- Current team: Sogndal
- Number: 6

Youth career
- –2012: Våg

Senior career*
Years	Team	Apps	(Gls)
2013	Vigør	5	(1)
2014–2015	Vindbjart	25	(0)
2016	Vigør	14	(1)
2016–2021	Grorud	123	(13)
2021	Stabæk	8	(1)
2022–2023	Sarpsborg 08	29	(0)
2024–	Sogndal	65	(5)
- * Club domestic league appearances and goals as of 14 November 2026

Martin Høyland (born 17 September 1995) is a Norwegian football midfielder who plays for Sogndal.

A youth product of Våg FK, he started his senior career going back and forth between FK Vigør and Vindbjart FK. In the autumn of 2016 he moved up a tier to 2. divisjon team Grorud IL, where the former Våg and Vindbjart player Eirik Kjønø was manager. Høyland became a stalwart of the Grorud team that won promotion to, and survived in, the 2020 1. divisjon. In the summer of 2021 he moved to Stabæk Fotball, where Kjønø now had become manager. He made his Stabæk debut in the cup and his Eliteserien debut in August 2021 against Sarpsborg 08.

On 30 January 2024, Høyland signed with Sogndal, on a contract until 2026.
