= Daniel Arrocha =

Danish footballer (born 1995)

Personal information
- Full name: Daniel Michael Rodriguez Arrocha
- Date of birth: 9 January 1995 (age 31)
- Height: 1.87 m (6 ft 2 in)
- Position: Centre-back

Team information
- Current team: Helsingør
- Number: 28

Youth career
- Herfølge

Senior career*
Years	Team	Apps	(Gls)
2013–2018	HB Køge	104	(1)
2018–2019	Nest-Sotra	42	(1)
2020	Øygarden	0	(0)
2020–2022	Jerv	43	(2)
2022	Mjøndalen	6	(0)
2023–2024	Sogndal	56	(4)
2025	Jerv	8	(0)
2026–	Helsingør	15	(0)
- * Club domestic league appearances and goals as of 18 June 2026

Daniel Michael Rodriguez Arrocha (born 9 January 1995) is a Danish footballer who plays as a centre-back for Danish 2nd Division side FC Helsingør.

== Career ==
Arrocha joined Norwegian First Division side Nest-Sotra in the summer of 2018. He moved to Jerv in May 2020. He missed the whole of the 2020 season due to injury. On 3 April 2022, he made his Eliteserien debut in a 1–0 win against Strømsgodset. On 31 August 2022, Arrocha moved to Mjøndalen IF.

On 5 February 2026, Arrocha joined Danish 2nd Division side FC Helsingør.
