= Robin Rasch =

Norwegian footballer (born 1994)

Personal information
- Full name: Robin Gravli Rasch
- Date of birth: 10 January 1994 (age 32)
- Place of birth: Lørenskog, Norway
- Height: 1.83 m (6 ft 0 in)
- Position: Central midfielder

Team information
- Current team: KFUM
- Number: 7

Youth career
- Ski
- –2012: Follo

Senior career*
Years	Team	Apps	(Gls)
2012–2015	Follo	79	(4)
2016–	KFUM	219	(37)
- * Club domestic league appearances and goals as of 15 April 2026

Robin Rasch (born 10 January 1994) is a Norwegian footballer who plays as a midfielder for KFUM.

== Career ==
Born in Lørenskog, he hails from Ski and started his youth career in Ski IL. He then progressed to the umbrella team in the region, Follo FK, where he made his senior debut in the 2012 2. divisjon. He helped win promotion to the 2013 1. divisjon, and in 2016 he moved to KFUM on the same level. KFUM were relegated in 2016, but re-promoted in 2018.

Rasch became a long-serving team captain, eventually leading KFUM to promotion to the 2024 Eliteserien, a level on which the club had never contested. He was the last squad member remaining from the previous promotion in 2018, and it had become a talking point that Rasch would not be picked up by other clubs, never reaching the Eliteserien unless he did so with KFUM. Rasch made his Eliteserien debut in April 2024 against Hamkam.

Rasch is known as an able free kick taker. Rasch's role in central midfield is that of a play-builder. He has stated inspiration from chess, Fantasy Premier League and play-by-play analysis such as Wyscout in his modelling of his play. He has also competed on national level in the age-specific categories of golf, and spends time on both racket games and card games. He beat Viktor Hovland on the Junior Tour in his teens, and has also beat Erling Haaland in a match where Follo faced Haaland's Bryne.

During his career Rasch has faced various injury breaks, partially owing to being diagnosed with both ulcerous colitis (which leads to inflammations) and ankylosing spondylitis. He missed major parts of the 2025 Eliteserien season.

== Honours ==
Individual

- Norwegian First Division Player of the Month: August 2022, June 2023
