= 2021 Kristiansund BK season =

Kristiansund
2021 season
- Chairman: Vidar Solli
- Head coach: Christian Michelsen
- Stadium: Kristiansund Stadion
- Eliteserien: 6th
- Norwegian Cup: Third round
- Top goalscorer: League: Bendik Bye (7); All: Bendik Bye (9)
Home colours	Away colours

The 2021 season was Kristiansund BK's 18th season in existence and the club's fifth consecutive season in the top flight of Norwegian football. In addition to the domestic league, Kristiansund BK participated in this season's edition of the Norwegian Football Cup.

== Players ==
=== First team squad ===
As of 18 October 2021

Note: Flags indicate national team as defined under FIFA eligibility rules; some limited exceptions apply. Players may hold more than one non-FIFA nationality.

No.	Pos.	Nation	Player
1	GK	(Republic of Ireland) IRL	Sean McDermott
2	DF	(Norway) NOR	Snorre Strand Nilsen
3	DF	(Norway) NOR	Christoffer Aasbak
5	DF	(Norway) NOR	Dan Peter Ulvestad
6	DF	(Norway) NOR	Andreas Hopmark
7	MF	(Norway) NOR	Jesper Isaksen
8	MF	(Norway) NOR	Sander Kartum
9	MF	(Albania) ALB	Agon Muçolli
10	MF	(Sweden) SWE	Liridon Kalludra
11	FW	(Norway) NOR	Moses Mawa
12	GK	(Sweden) SWE	Elias Hadaya

No.	Pos.	Nation	Player
13	FW	(Norway) NOR	Bendik Bye
15	DF	(Norway) NOR	Erlend Sivertsen
16	DF	(Norway) NOR	Ivar Furu
17	FW	(Iceland) ISL	Brynjólfur Willumsson
18	FW	(Ethiopia) ETH	Amin Askar
19	DF	(Senegal) SEN	Aliou Coly
20	FW	(United States) USA	Lagos Kunga
21	MF	(Senegal) SEN	Amidou Diop
23	MF	(Norway) NOR	Pål Erik Ulvestad
25	MF	(Norway) NOR	Torgil Øwre Gjertsen
37	FW	(Norway) NOR	Oskar Sivertsen

For season transfers, see transfers winter 2020–21 and transfers summer 2021.

=== Out on loan ===
Note: Flags indicate national team as defined under FIFA eligibility rules; some limited exceptions apply. Players may hold more than one non-FIFA nationality.

No.	Pos.	Nation	Player
30	GK	(Senegal) SEN	Serigne Mbaye (on loan at Sogndal until 31 December 2021)
26	DF	(Norway) NOR	Max Normann Williamsen (on loan at Levanger until 31 December 2021)
14	MF	(Norway) NOR	Horenus Taddese (on loan at Sandnes Ulf until 31 December 2021)

No.	Pos.	Nation	Player
28	MF	(Norway) NOR	Noah Solskjær (on loan at Sogndal until 31 December 2021)
27	MF	(Norway) NOR	Sander Aakvik Lille-Løvø (on loan at Brattvåg until 31 December 2021)
29	FW	(Cameroon) CMR	Faris Pemi Moumbagna (on loan at SønderjyskE until 30 June 2022)

== Transfers ==
=== Winter ===
In: Note: Flags indicate national team as defined under FIFA eligibility rules; some limited exceptions apply. Players may hold more than one non-FIFA nationality.

No.	Pos.	Nation	Player
2	DF	(Norway) NOR	Snorre Strand Nilsen (from Raufoss)
8	MF	(Norway) NOR	Sander Kartum (from Stjørdals-Blink)
9	MF	(Denmark) DEN	Agon Muçolli (from (Denmark) Fredericia)
12	GK	(Sweden) SWE	Elias Hadaya (from Levanger)
15	DF	(Norway) NOR	Erlend Sivertsen (loan return from Tromsø)
17	FW	(Iceland) ISL	Brynjólfur Willumsson (from (Iceland) Breiðablik)
25	FW	(Norway) NOR	Torgil Øwre Gjertsen (from (Poland) Wisła Płock)

Out: Note: Flags indicate national team as defined under FIFA eligibility rules; some limited exceptions apply. Players may hold more than one non-FIFA nationality.

No.	Pos.	Nation	Player
4	DF	(France) FRA	Christophe Psyché (to (Cyprus) AEL Limassol)
9	FW	(Norway) NOR	Amahl Pellegrino (to (Saudi Arabia) Damac)
14	MF	(Norway) NOR	Horenus Tadesse (on loan to Sandnes Ulf)
24	MF	(Norway) NOR	Sondre Sørli (to Bodø/Glimt)
25	GK	(Norway) NOR	Eirik Johansen (loan return to Brann)
27	MF	(Norway) NOR	Sander Lille-Løvø (on loan to Brattvåg, previously on loan at Levanger)
28	MF	(Norway) NOR	Noah Solskjær (on loan to Sogndal)
30	GK	(Senegal) SEN	Serigne Mor Mbaye (on loan to Sogndal, previously on loan at HamKam)
33	DF	(Norway) NOR	Kjetil Holand Tøsse (to Stjørdals-Blink)

=== Summer ===
In: Note: Flags indicate national team as defined under FIFA eligibility rules; some limited exceptions apply. Players may hold more than one non-FIFA nationality.

No.	Pos.	Nation	Player
7	MF	(Norway) NOR	Jesper Isaksen (from Stabæk)
11	FW	(Norway) NOR	Moses Mawa (from Strømsgodset)
20	FW	(United States) USA	Lagos Kunga (free transfer)
30	GK	(Senegal) SEN	Serigne Mor Mbaye (loan return from Sogndal)
35	DF	(Norway) NOR	Isak Lein Aalberg (from Steinkjer)
36	DF	(Norway) NOR	Bendik Brevik (promoted from junior squad)
38	FW	(Norway) NOR	Marius Weidel (promoted from junior squad)
39	MF	(Norway) NOR	Heine Gikling Bruseth (promoted from junior squad)
40	GK	(Norway) NOR	Adrian Sæther (promoted from junior squad)

Out: Note: Flags indicate national team as defined under FIFA eligibility rules; some limited exceptions apply. Players may hold more than one non-FIFA nationality.

No.	Pos.	Nation	Player
7	MF	(Norway) NOR	Olaus Skarsem (to Rosenborg)
11	FW	(Norway) NOR	Flamur Kastrati (to Odd)
14	MF	(Norway) NOR	Horenus Tadesse (to Sandnes Ulf, previously on loan)
20	MF	(Senegal) SEN	Ousseynou Cavin Diagné (released)
22	MF	(Norway) NOR	Bent Sørmo (to (Belgium) Zulte Waregem)
26	MF	(Norway) NOR	Max Normann Williamsen (on loan to Levanger)
28	MF	(Norway) NOR	Noah Solskjær (to Sogndal, previously on loan)
29	FW	(Cameroon) CMR	Faris Pemi Moumbagna (on loan to (Denmark) SønderjyskE)

== Competitions ==
=== Eliteserien ===
==== Results summary ====
Overall								Home						Away					
Pld	W	D	L	GF	GA	GD	Pts	W	D	L	GF	GA	GD	W	D	L	GF	GA	GD
30	14	4	12	41	46	−5	46	10	2	3	27	16	+11	4	2	9	14	30	−16

Last updated: 12 December 2021.

==== Results by round ====
Round	1	2	3	4	5	6	7	8	9	10	11	12	13	14	15	16	17	18	19	20	21	22	23	24	25	26	27	28	29	30
Ground	A	H	A	H	A	H	H	A	H	A	H	A	H	A	H	A	H	A	H	A	H	A	H	A	H	A	A	H	A	H
Result	L	L	W	W	W	W	W	L	D	D	W	L	W	L	W	L	W	W	W	L	W	D	L	L	D	W	L	L	L	W
Position	14	15	12	8	5	2	2	4	4	5	3	5	3	4	3	5	4	3	3	4	3	3	5	5	6	5	5	6	7	6

A = Away; H = Home; W = Win; D = Draw; L = Loss

==== Matches ====
9 May 2021 1	Molde	2–0	Kristiansund	Molde
18:00 CEST (UTC+2)	Andersen 21'; Brynhildsen 32'	Report		Stadium: Aker Stadion; Attendance: 600; Referee: Kai Erik Steen

12 May 2021 2	Kristiansund	0–2	Bodø/Glimt	Kristiansund
18:00 CEST (UTC+2)		Report	Sørli 29'; Botheim 67'	Stadium: Kristiansund Stadion; Attendance: 600; Referee: Sivert Øksnes Amland

16 May 2021 3	Vålerenga	1–2	Kristiansund	Oslo
15:00 CEST (UTC+2)	Kjartansson 90+2'	Report	Strand Nilsen 41'; D. P. Ulvestad 56'<	Stadium: Intility Arena; Attendance: 0 Referee: Svein Oddvar Moen

24 May 2021 4	Kristiansund	1–0	Strømsgodset	Kristiansund
18:00 CEST (UTC+2)	Bye 34'	Report		Stadium: Kristiansund Stadion; Attendance: 600; Referee: Ola Hobber Nilsen

27 May 2021 5	Sarpsborg 08	0–1	Kristiansund	Sarpsborg
18:00 CEST (UTC+2)		Report	Kartum 76'	Stadium: Sarpsborg Stadion; Attendance: 600; Referee: Svein Oddvar Moen

30 May 2021 6	Kristiansund	1–0	Lillestrøm	Kristiansund
18:00 CEST (UTC+2)	Bye 83'	Report		Stadium: Kristiansund Stadion; Attendance: 600; Referee: Tore Hansen

12 June 2021 7	Kristiansund	2–0	Odd	Kristiansund
15:00 CEST (UTC+2)	Kartum 63'; Muçolli 90+1'	Report		Stadium: Kristiansund Stadion; Attendance: 600; Referee: Mohammad Usman Aslam

20 June 2021 8	Haugesund	3–0	Kristiansund	Haugesund
18:00 CEST (UTC+2)	Desler 63'; Wadji 71'; Sandberg 90+3' (pen.)	Report		Stadium: Haugesund stadion Attendance: 2,000; Referee: Marius Hansen Grøtta

24 June 2021 9	Kristiansund	1–1	Mjøndalen	Kristiansund
18:00 CEST (UTC+2)	Gjertsen 38'	Report	Sveen 16'	Stadium: Kristiansund Stadion; Attendance: 1,831; Referee: Kristoffer Hagenes

30 June 2021 10	Tromsø	0–0	Kristiansund	Tromsø
18:00 CEST (UTC+2)		Report		Stadium: Alfheim Stadion; Attendance: 1,574; Referee: Rohit Saggi

5 July 2021 11	Kristiansund	3–2	Brann	Kristiansund
19:00 CEST (UTC+2)	Muçolli 57'; Gjertsen 60'; Hopmark 76'	Report	Rasmussen 9'; Bamba 68'	Stadium: Kristiansund Stadion; Attendance: 1,905; Referee: Espen Eskås

10 July 2021 12	Rosenborg	1–0	Kristiansund	Trondheim
18:00 CEST (UTC+2)	Islamović 15'	Report		Stadium: Lerkendal Stadion; Attendance: 5,463; Referee: Svein Oddvar Moen

18 July 2021 13	Kristiansund	2–0	Sandefjord	Kristiansund
18:00 CEST (UTC+2)	Aasbak 55'; Fjeldskår 89' (o.g.)	Report		Stadium: Kristiansund Stadion; Attendance: 1,900; Referee: Tom Harald Hagen

8 August 2021 14	Viking	3–2	Kristiansund	Stavanger
18:00 CEST (UTC+2)	Tripić 9', 80'; Sebulonsen 16'	Report	Nilsen 35'; Bye 88'	Stadium: Viking Stadion; Attendance: 3,511; Referee: Espen Eskås

14 August 2021 15	Kristiansund	5–1	Stabæk	Kristiansund
18:00 CEST (UTC+2)	Nilsen 30'; Bye 39' (pen.); Muçolli 48'; Kartum 55'; Sivertsen 89'	Report	Høyland 28'	Stadium: Kristiansund Stadion; Attendance: 1,900; Referee: Kristoffer Hagenes

22 August 2021 16	Bodø/Glimt	3–0	Kristiansund	Bodø
18:00 CEST (UTC+2)	Pellegrino 61', 67', 78'	Report		Stadium: Aspmyra Stadion; Attendance: 2,000; Referee: Christian Moen

29 August 2021 17	Kristiansund	2–0	Molde	Kristiansund
18:00 CEST (UTC+2)	Mawa 57'; Muçolli 59'	Report		Stadium: Kristiansund Stadion; Attendance: 1,911; Referee: Ola Hobber Nilsen

12 September 2021 18	Strømsgodset	1–2	Kristiansund	Drammen
18:00 CEST (UTC+2)	Tokstad 54'	Report	Bye 20' (pen.); Coly 90+3'	Stadium: Marienlyst Stadion; Attendance: 2,522; Referee: Sivert Øksnes Amland

18 September 2021 19	Kristiansund	3–2	Haugesund	Kristiansund
18:00 CEST (UTC+2)	Kartum 9'; Gjertsen 76'; Nilsen 89'	Report	Hansen 22'; Sandberg 50'	Stadium: Kristiansund Stadion; Attendance: 1,919; Referee: Marius Hansen Grøtta

26 September 2021 20	Brann	3–1	Kristiansund	Bergen
18:00 CEST (UTC+2)	D. P. Ulvestad 19' (o.g.); Strand 78'; Rasmussen 89'	Report	Sery Larsen 41' (o.g.)	Stadium: Brann Stadion; Attendance: 8,076; Referee: Tom Harald Hagen

3 October 2021 21	Kristiansund	1–0	Rosenborg	Kristiansund
20:00 CEST (UTC+2)	Strand Nilsen 9'	Report		Stadium: Kristiansund Stadion; Attendance: 4,444; Referee: Kai Erik Steen

16 October 2021 22	Lillestrøm	0–0	Kristiansund	Lillestrøm
18:00 CEST (UTC+2)		Report		Stadium: Åråsen Stadion; Attendance: 5,652; Referee: Espen Eskås

24 October 2021 23	Kristiansund	1–3	Sarpsborg 08	Kristiansund
17:00 CEST (UTC+2)	Strand Nilsen 90+1'	Report	Lindseth 7', 64', 78'	Stadium: Kristiansund Stadion; Attendance: 3,932; Referee: Sigurd Smehus Kringstad

27 October 2021 24	Mjøndalen	5–0	Kristiansund	Mjøndalen
18:00 CEST (UTC+2)	Twum 37'; Larsen 44', 71'; Stokke 57'; Eriksen 83'	Report		Stadium: Consto Arena; Attendance: 1,427; Referee: Tommy Skjerven

30 October 2021 25	Kristiansund	1–1	Tromsø	Kristiansund
16:00 CEST (UTC+2)	Kalludra 17'	Report	Mikkelsen 36'	Stadium: Kristiansund Stadion; Attendance: 3,841; Referee: Mohammad Usman Aslam

7 November 2021 26	Odd	2–4	Kristiansund	Skien
17:00 CET (UTC+1)	Wallem 1'; Lauritsen 64'	Report	Gjertsen 4'; Mawa 48', 54', 77'	Stadium: Skagerak Arena; Attendance: 3,300; Referee: Rohit Saggi

21 November 2021 27	Stabæk	3–0	Kristiansund	Bærum
17:00 CET (UTC+1)	Solbakken 50'; Haugen 53'; Edvardsen 78'	Report		Stadium: Nadderud Stadion; Attendance: 2,353; Referee: Mohammad Usman Aslam

28 November 2021 28	Kristiansund	2–3	Viking	Kristiansund
17:00 CET (UTC+1)	Bye 3'; Gjertsen 65'	Report	Løkberg 40'; Berisha 87' (pen.); Bjørshol 90+2'	Stadium: Kristiansund Stadion; Attendance: 3,914; Referee: Kristoffer Hagenes

5 December 2021 29	Sandefjord	3–2	Kristiansund	Sandefjord
17:00 CEST (UTC+2)	Jónsson 30'; Ruud Tveter 38'; Brenden 45'	Report	Gjertsen 53'; Isaksen 77'	Stadium: Release Arena; Attendance: 1,077; Referee: Sigurd Smehus Kringstad

12 December 2021 30	Kristiansund	2–1	Vålerenga	Kristiansund
17:00 CET (UTC+1)	Bye 66'; Mawa 81' (pen.)	Report	Williamsen 78' (o.g.)	Stadium: Kristiansund Stadion; Attendance: 3,522; Referee: Marius Hansen Grøtta

==== Table ====
Pos	Team	Pld	W	D	L	GF	GA	GD	Pts	Qualification or relegation
4	Lillestrøm	30	14	7	9	49	40	+9	49	Qualification for the Europa Conference League second qualifying round (Note: Since the winners of the 2021 Norwegian Cup, Molde, have already qualified for European competitions based on league position, the last European spot was passed down to the fourth placed team, Lillestrøm.)
5	Rosenborg	30	13	9	8	58	42	+16	48	
6	Kristiansund	30	14	4	12	41	46	−5	46	
7	Vålerenga	30	11	12	7	46	37	+9	45	
8	Sarpsborg 08	30	11	6	13	39	44	−5	39	

Source: Football Association of Norway (in Norwegian)
Rules for classification: 1) Points; 2) Goal difference; 3) Goals scored; 4) Head-to-head points; 5) Head-to-head goal difference; 6) Head-to-head away goals scored (only if between two teams); 7) Head-to-head goals scored; 8) Play-off (only used to decide champions or relegation).

=== Norwegian Football Cup ===
24 July 2021 First round	Volda	2–4 (a.e.t.)	Kristiansund	Volda
16:00 CEST (UTC+2)	K. Myklebust 14', 42'	Report	Willumsson 61', 110', 119'; Diop 86'	Stadium: Volda Stadion; Attendance: 573; Referee: Torgeir Halsen

1 August 2021 Second round	Tiller	1–5	Kristiansund	Trondheim
18:00 CEST (UTC+2)	O. Bugten 82'	Report	O. Sivertsen 27'; Gjertsen 61'; Isaksen 74'; Muçolli 84'; Bye 90+4'	Stadium: Tobb Arena Sør; Attendance: 500; Referee: Dag Vidar Hafsås

22 September 2021 Third round	KFUM Oslo	3–1	Kristiansund	Oslo
17:00 CEST (UTC+2)	R. Svindland 15'; A. Sanyang 51' (pen.); Njie 67'	Report	Gjertsen 17'	Stadium: KFUM Arena; Attendance: 663; Referee: Marius Lien
