= 2020 Kristiansund BK season =

Kristiansund
2020 season
- Chairman: Vidar Solli
- Manager: Christian Michelsen
- Stadium: Kristiansund Stadion
- Eliteserien: 5th
- Norwegian Cup: Canceled due to the COVID-19 pandemic
- Top goalscorer: League: Amahl Pellegrino (25); All: Amahl Pellegrino (25)
Home colours	Away colours	Third colours

The 2020 season was Kristiansund's fourth season in the Eliteserien, the top football division in Norway.

== Season events ==
In January, Sander Lille-Løvø was promoted to the first team from Kristiansund's youth team.

On 12 June, the Norwegian Football Federation announced that a maximum of 200 home fans would be allowed to attend the upcoming seasons matches.

On 10 September, the Norwegian Football Federation cancelled the 2020 Norwegian Cup due to the COVID-19 pandemic in Norway.

On 30 September, the Minister of Culture and Gender Equality, Abid Raja, announced that clubs would be able to have crowds of 600 at games from 12 October.

== Squad ==
Note: Flags indicate national team as defined under FIFA eligibility rules; some limited exceptions apply. Players may hold more than one non-FIFA nationality.

No.	Pos.	Nation	Player
1	GK	IRL	Sean McDermott
3	DF	NOR	Christoffer Aasbak
4	DF	FRA	Christophe Psyché
5	DF	NOR	Dan Ulvestad
6	DF	NOR	Andreas Hopmark
7	MF	NOR	Sondre Sørli
8	MF	SEN	Amidou Diop
9	FW	NOR	Amahl Pellegrino
10	MF	SWE	Liridon Kalludra
11	FW	KOS	Flamur Kastrati
13	FW	NOR	Bendik Bye
16	DF	NOR	Ivar Furu

No.	Pos.	Nation	Player
17	MF	NOR	Olaus Skarsem
18	MF	ETH	Amin Askar
19	DF	SEN	Aliou Coly
20	MF	SEN	Ousseynou Diagné
22	MF	NOR	Bent Sørmo
23	MF	NOR	Pål Ulvestad
25	GK	NOR	Eirik Johansen (on loan from Brann)
26	DF	NOR	Max Williamsen
28	MF	NOR	Noah Solskjær
29	FW	CMR	Faris Moumbagna
—	DF	NOR	Kjetil Holand Tøsse

=== Out on loan ===
Note: Flags indicate national team as defined under FIFA eligibility rules; some limited exceptions apply. Players may hold more than one non-FIFA nationality.

No.	Pos.	Nation	Player
14	MF	NOR	Horenus Taddese (at Sandnes Ulf until 7 September 2020)
15	DF	NOR	Erlend Sivertsen (at Tromsø until 31 December 2020)
27	MF	NOR	Sander Lille-Løvø (at Levanger until 31 December 2020)
30	GK	SEN	Serigne Mbaye (at HamKam until 31 December 2020)

== Transfers ==
=== In ===
Date	Position	Nationality	Name	From	Fee	Ref.
6 November 2019	MF	(Norway)	Horenus Taddese	Levanger	Undisclosed	
17 December 2019	DF	(Norway)	Ivar Furu	Ranheim	Undisclosed	
20 December 2019	MF	(Ethiopia)	Amin Askar	Sarpsborg 08	Undisclosed	
10 January 2020	MF	(Norway)	Olaus Skarsem	Rosenborg	Undisclosed	
7 February 2020	MF	(Senegal)	Ousseynou Diagné	Club Brugge	Undisclosed	
18 May 2020	FW	(Cameroon)	Faris Moumbagna	Rainbow	Undisclosed	
30 June 2020	MF	(Senegal)	Amidou Diop	Adanaspor	Undisclosed	
5 October 2020	DF	(Norway)	Kjetil Holand Tøsse	Notodden	Undisclosed	

=== Loans in ===
Date from	Position	Nationality	Name	to	Date to	Ref.
15 June 2020	GK	(Norway)	Eirik Johansen	Brann	End of season	

=== Out ===
Date	Position	Nationality	Name	To	Fee	Ref.
3 December 2019	MF	(Norway)	Jesper Isaksen	Stabæk	Undisclosed	
13 December 2019	FW	(Sweden)	Simon Alexandersson	Öster	Undisclosed	
3 January 2020	MF	(Faroe Islands)	Meinhard Olsen	B36 Tórshavn	Undisclosed	
14 January 2020	MF	(Senegal)	Amidou Diop	Adanaspor	Undisclosed	
16 January 2020	FW	(Norway)	Henrik Gjesdal	Start	Undisclosed	
17 January 2020	FW	(Norway)	Torgil Øwre Gjertsen	Wisła Płock	Undisclosed	

=== Loans out ===
Date from	Position	Nationality	Name	to	Date to	Ref.
2 July 2020	DF	(Norway)	Marius Olsen	Levanger	31 December 2020	
2 July 2020	MF	(Norway)	Horenus Taddese	Sandnes Ulf	7 September 2020	
8 July 2020	MF	(Norway)	Sander Lille-Løvø	Levanger	31 December 2020	
29 September 2020	DF	(Norway)	Erlend Sivertsen	Tromsø	31 December 2020	
3 October 2020	GK	(Cameroon)	Serigne Mbaye	HamKam	31 December 2020	

=== Released ===
Date	Position	Nationality	Name	Joined	Date
28 June 2020	MF	(Norway)	Olav Øby	KFUM	

== Competitions ==
=== Eliteserien ===
==== Results summary ====
Overall								Home						Away					
Pld	W	D	L	GF	GA	GD	Pts	W	D	L	GF	GA	GD	W	D	L	GF	GA	GD
30	12	12	6	57	45	+12	48	7	4	4	34	26	+8	5	8	2	23	19	+4

Last updated: 22 December 2020.
Source: Results

==== Results by round ====
Round	1	2	3	4	5	6	7	8	9	10	11	12	13	14	15	16	17	18	19	20	21	22	23	24	25	26	27	28	29	30
Ground	A	H	A	A	H	A	H	A	H	A	H	A	H	A	H	A	H	A	H	A	H	A	H	A	H	H	A	H	A	H
Result	D	W	D	W	D	D	L	L	D	D	W	W	W	L	W	W	L	W	D	W	D	D	L	D	W	W	D	W	D	L
Position	10	5	5	3	4	3	7	9	9	8	7	5	6	6	6	5	6	6	6	6	5	6	6	6	6	5	5	5	5	5

Updated to match(es) played on 22 December 2020. Source: Results
A = Away; H = Home; W = Win; D = Draw; L = Loss

==== Results ====
16 June 2020 1	Rosenborg	0–0	Kristiansund	Trondheim
18:00 CEST (UTC+2)	Trondsen (yellow card) 65'	Report	Hopmark (yellow card) 58'	Stadium: Lerkendal Stadion; Attendance: 200; Referee: Espen Eskås

21 June 2020 2	Kristiansund	7–2	Aalesund	Kristiansund
18:00 CEST (UTC+2)	Kastrati (yellow card) 16'; Pellegrino 24', 35', 65'; Kalludra 31'; Askar 63'; Sørli 68'; Bye 81'	Report	Ólafsson (yellow card) 2'; P.Ulvestad 11' (o.g.); O.Lie (yellow card) 16'; Hatlehol (yellow card) 23'; Friðjónsson 37'; Sæthre (yellow card) 56'; Castro (yellow card) 70'	Stadium: Kristiansund Stadion; Attendance: 200; Referee: Kai Erik Steen

24 June 2020 3	Haugesund	2–2	Kristiansund	Haugesund
18:00 CEST (UTC+2)	Ammitzbøll 47'; Sandberg 70'; Nilsen (yellow card) 76'	Report	Askar 23'; Sivertsen (yellow card) 36'; Psyché (yellow card) 46' (goal) 73'; Moumbagna (yellow card) 51'	Stadium: Haugesund Stadion; Attendance: 200; Referee: Sivert Amland

28 June 2020 4	Mjøndalen	1–2	Kristiansund	Mjøndalen
18:00 CEST (UTC+2)	Ibrahim 90+2'	Report	Kalludra 50'; Pellegrino 86'	Stadium: Consto Arena; Attendance: 200; Referee: Ola Hobber Nilsen

2 July 2020 5	Kristiansund	2–2	Molde	Kristiansund
18:00 CEST (UTC+2)	P.Ulvestad (yellow card) 32'; Pellegrino 52'; Hopmark 90+5' (pen.)	Report	Hussain (yellow card) 31' (goal) 64'; P.Ulvestad 73' (o.g.)	Stadium: Kristiansund Stadion; Attendance: 200; Referee: Tommy Skjerven

5 July 2020 6	Strømsgodset	2–2	Kristiansund	Drammen
18:00 CEST (UTC+2)	Hove 55'; Mawa 77'	Report	Pellegrino 27', 39'; Coly (yellow card) 45+2'; Askar (yellow card) 59'	Stadium: Marienlyst Stadion; Attendance: 200; Referee: Tore Hansen

12 July 2020 7	Kristiansund	1–2	Stabæk	Kristiansund
18:00 CEST (UTC+2)	Sørmo 11'; Sivertsen (yellow card) 71'	Report	Bohinen 14' (pen.) (yellow card) 52'; Hansen 88'	Stadium: Kristiansund Stadion; Attendance: 200; Referee: Mohammad Usman Aslam

15 July 2020 8	Bodø/Glimt	2–1	Kristiansund	Bodø
18:00 CEST (UTC+2)	Skytte (yellow card) 55'; Berg 58'; Zinckernagel (yellow card) 71'; Lode (yellow card) 82'	Report	Diop (yellow card) 19'; Pellegrino 35'	Stadium: Aspmyra Stadion; Attendance: 200; Referee: Kai Erik Steen

19 July 2020 9	Kristiansund	0–0	Vålerenga	Kristiansund
18:00 CEST (UTC+2)	Diop (yellow card) 40'	Report	Dønnum (yellow card) 68'; Sahraoui (yellow card) 77'; Bjørdal (yellow card) 90+3'	Stadium: Kristiansund Stadion; Attendance: 200; Referee: Mohammad Usman Aslam

25 July 2020 10	Brann	1–1	Kristiansund	Bergen
20:30 CEST (UTC+2)	Ordagić (yellow card) 17'; Bamba (yellow card) 28'; Kristiansen (yellow card) 46'; Koomson 73' (yellow card) 73'; Acosta (yellow card) 90+4'	Report	D.Ulvestad 87'	Stadium: Brann Stadion; Attendance: 200; Referee: Espen Eskås

29 July 2020 11	Kristiansund	3–1	Sandefjord	Kristiansund
18:00 CEST (UTC+2)	Bye 72'; Skarsem (yellow card) 75'; Pellegrino 83'	Report	Gussiås 5'; Vales (yellow card) 25'; Markmanrud (yellow card) 56'; Mørk (yellow card) 78'	Stadium: Kristiansund Stadion; Attendance: 200; Referee: Svein Oddvar Moen

2 August 2020 12	Viking	1–2	Kristiansund	Stavanger
18:00 CEST (UTC+2)	Berisha 12'; Vevatne (yellow card) 90+1'	Report	D.Ulvestad (yellow card) 4' (goal) 87'; Psyché (yellow card) 38'; Skarsem 65' (yellow card) 90+3'	Stadium: Viking Stadion; Attendance: 200; Referee: Rohit Saggi

9 August 2020 13	Kristiansund	3–2	Start	Kristiansund
18:00 CEST (UTC+2)	Bye 13'; Pellegrino 74'; Coly 82'; Kastrati (yellow card) 90'	Report	Ugland (yellow card) 35'; Skaanes 67', 72'	Stadium: Kristiansund Stadion; Attendance: 200; Referee: Sigurd Smehus Kringstad

16 August 2020 14	Odd	2–1	Kristiansund	Skien
18:00 CEST (UTC+2)	Lunding 20'; Bakenga 37'	Report	Pellegrino 17' (pen.); Kalludra (yellow card) 45+3'; Diagné (yellow card) 90+4'	Stadium: Skagerak Arena; Attendance: 200; Referee: Espen Eskås

22 August 2020 15	Kristiansund	4–1	Sarpsborg 08	Kristiansund
18:00 CEST (UTC+2)	Pellegrino 52' (pen.), 62'; Kalludra 59'; Askar (yellow card) 77'; Hopmark (yellow card) 90+1'; Sivertsen 90+4'	Report	Falch (yellow card) 52'; Konté (yellow card) 76'; Larsen 90'	Stadium: Kristiansund Stadion; Attendance: 200; Referee: Ola Hobber Nilsen

30 August 2020 16	Sandefjord	0–2	Kristiansund	Sandefjord
18:00 CEST (UTC+2)	Vallès (yellow card) 44'; Gussiås (yellow card) 69'	Report	Pellegrino 37' (pen.), 85'; Kastrati (yellow card) 45+1'; Kalludra (yellow card) 56'; Moumbagna (yellow card) 67'	Stadium: Sandefjord Arena; Attendance: 200; Referee: Marius Hansen Grøtta

12 September 2020 17	Kristiansund	3–5	Viking	Kristiansund
20:30 CEST (UTC+2)	Pellegrino 39', 80' (pen.); Bye 75'; Diagné (yellow card) 90+4'	Report	Berisha 4', 61'; Vikstøl (yellow card) 29'; Torsteinbø (yellow card) 55'; Bytyqi 69', 72'; Ibrahimaj 86'	Stadium: Kristiansund Stadion; Attendance: 200; Referee: Ola Hobber Nilsen

20 September 2020 18	Start	1–2	Kristiansund	Kristiansand
18:00 CEST (UTC+2)	El Makrini (yellow card) 45+3'; Schulze (yellow card) 63'; Bolaños 90+6'	Report	Pellegrino 29'; Aasbak 39' (yellow card) 43'; Diagné (yellow card) 71'	Stadium: Sør Arena; Attendance: 200; Referee: Marius Hansen Grøtta

27 September 2020 19	Kristiansund	1–1	Brann	Kristiansund
18:00 CEST (UTC+2)	Diop (yellow card) 41'; Pellegrino 63' (pen.)	Report	Tveita (yellow card) 29'; Pedersen (yellow card) 47'; Taylor (yellow card) 57'; Opdal (yellow card) 61'; Bamba 73'	Stadium: Kristiansund Stadion; Attendance: 200; Referee: Espen Eskås

4 October 2020 20	Aalesund	1–2	Kristiansund	Ålesund
18:00 CEST (UTC+2)	Karlsbakk 28'; Karamoko (yellow card) 87'; Haugen (yellow card) 90+6'	Report	Aasbak (yellow card) 3'; Moumbagna 53' (yellow card) 55'; Kalludra 65'; Kastrati (yellow card) 86'; P.Ulvestad (yellow card) 90+6'	Stadium: Color Line Stadion; Attendance: 200; Referee: Rohit Saggi

18 October 2020 21	Kristiansund	0–0	Rosenborg	Kristiansund
18:00 CEST (UTC+2)	Diop (yellow card) 21'	Report	Konate (yellow card) 47'	Stadium: Kristiansund Stadion; Attendance: 600; Referee: Tore Hansen

25 October 2020 22	Vålerenga	1–1	Kristiansund	Oslo
18:00 CET (UTC+1)	Kjartansson 59'	Report	Kalludra (yellow card) 52'; Bye 82'	Stadium: Intility Arena; Attendance: 200; Referee: Tom Harald Hagen

1 November 2020 23	Kristiansund	2–3	Bodø/Glimt	Kristiansund
18:00 CET (UTC+1)	Pellegrino 5' (yellow card) 6'; Coly (yellow card) 33'; Bye 79'	Report	Moberg 29'; Junker 48' (pen.), 89'; Berg (yellow card) 51'	Stadium: Kristiansund Stadion; Attendance: 600; Referee: Marius Hansen Grøtta

8 November 2020 24	Molde	2–2	Kristiansund	Molde
18:00 CET (UTC+1)	Hussain 12'; Bolly (yellow card) 83'; Aursnes 89'	Report	Pellegrino 14'; Moumbagna 23'	Stadium: Aker Stadion; Attendance: 600; Referee: Sigurd Smehus Kringstad

22 November 2020 25	Kristiansund	1–0	Mjøndalen	Kristiansund
18:00 CET (UTC+1)	D.Ulvestad 3'	Report	Eriksen (yellow card) 66'; Nakkim (yellow card) 90+2'	Stadium: Kristiansund Stadion; Attendance: 600; Referee: Dag Vidar Hafsås

29 November 2020 26	Kristiansund	2–1	Strømsgodset	Kristiansund
18:00 CET (UTC+1)	Psyché (yellow card) 18' (yellow-red card) 81'; Aasbak (yellow card) 53'; Pellegrino 57' (pen.), 69' (pen.); Moumbagna (yellow card) 66'	Report	Mawa 5'; Maigaard (yellow card) 25'; Stengel (yellow card) 53'; Stenevik (yellow card) 65'	Stadium: Kristiansund Stadion; Attendance: 600; Referee: Tom Harald Hagen

2 December 2020 27	Sarpsborg 08	1–1	Kristiansund	Sarpsborg
18:00 CET (UTC+1)	Adéoti (yellow card) 11'; Dyrestam (yellow card) 34' (yellow-red card) 41'; Jarl 85'; Soltvedt (yellow card) 90'; Thomassen (yellow card) 90'	Report	Skarsem 21' (yellow card) 43'	Stadium: Sarpsborg Stadion; Attendance: 600; Referee: Ola Hobber Nilsen

9 December 2020 28	Kristiansund	4–3	Odd	Kristiansund
18:00 CET (UTC+1)	Hopmark (yellow card) 12'; Sørli 45', 57'; Skarsem (yellow card) 61'; Pellegrino 75', 90+3'; Moumbagna (yellow card) 90+8'	Report	Bakenga 43', 81', 90+1'	Stadium: Kristiansund Stadion; Attendance: 600; Referee: Kai Erik Steen

13 December 2020 29	Stabæk	2–2	Kristiansund	Bærum
18:00 CET (UTC+1)	Edvardsen 55'; Øveraas 65'; Bohinen (yellow card) 75'; Antonsson (yellow card) 78'; Valsvik (yellow card) 87'	Report	Sørli (yellow card) 33'; Sørmo (yellow card) 68'; Moumbagna 80'; Psyché 84'	Stadium: Nadderud Stadion; Attendance: 200; Referee: Rohit Saggi

22 December 2020 30	Kristiansund	1–3	Haugesund	Kristiansund
18:00 CET (UTC+1)	Moumbagna 31'; Psyché (yellow card) 82'	Report	Wadji 53', 54', 90+2'; Leite (yellow card) 65'	Stadium: Kristiansund Stadion; Attendance: 600; Referee: Marius Hansen Grøtta

==== Table ====
Pos	Team	Pld	W	D	L	GF	GA	GD	Pts	Qualification or relegation
3	Vålerenga	30	15	10	5	51	33	+18	55	Qualification for the Europa Conference League second qualifying round
4	Rosenborg	30	15	7	8	50	35	+15	52	Qualification for the Europa Conference League second qualifying round
5	Kristiansund	30	12	12	6	57	45	+12	48	
6	Viking	30	12	8	10	54	52	+2	44	
7	Odd	30	13	4	13	52	51	+1	43	

Source: Football Association of Norway (in Norwegian)
Rules for classification: 1) Points; 2) Goal difference; 3) Goals scored; 4) Head-to-head points; 5) Head-to-head goal difference; 6) Head-to-head away goals scored (only if between two teams); 7) Head-to-head goals scored; 8) Play-off (only used to decide champions or relegation).

=== Norwegian Cup ===
2020 First round	–
CEST (UTC+2)
Note: Cup cancelled on 10 September due to the COVID-19 pandemic in Norway.

== Squad statistics ==
As of match played 22 December 2020

=== Appearances and goals ===
No.	Pos	Nat	Player	Total		Eliteserien		Norwegian Cup	
No.	Pos	Nat	Player	Apps	Goals	Apps	Goals	Apps	Goals
1	GK	(Republic of Ireland) IRL	Sean McDermott	12	0	12	0	0	0
3	DF	(Norway) NOR	Christoffer Aasbak	23	1	21+2	1	0	0
4	DF	(France) FRA	Christophe Psyché	22	2	15+7	2	0	0
5	DF	(Norway) NOR	Dan Ulvestad	22	3	22	3	0	0
6	DF	(Norway) NOR	Andreas Hopmark	30	1	27+3	1	0	0
7	MF	(Norway) NOR	Sondre Sørli	27	3	19+8	3	0	0
8	MF	(Senegal) SEN	Amidou Diop	18	0	14+4	0	0	0
9	FW	(Norway) NOR	Amahl Pellegrino	29	25	27+2	25	0	0
10	MF	(Sweden) SWE	Liridon Kalludra	26	4	19+7	4	0	0
11	FW	(Kosovo) KOS	Flamur Kastrati	23	0	17+6	0	0	0
13	FW	(Norway) NOR	Bendik Bye	24	6	9+15	6	0	0
16	DF	(Norway) NOR	Ivar Furu	10	0	7+3	0	0	0
17	MF	(Norway) NOR	Olaus Skarsem	26	3	22+4	3	0	0
18	MF	(Ethiopia) ETH	Amin Askar	28	2	11+17	2	0	0
19	DF	(Senegal) SEN	Aliou Coly	23	1	18+5	1	0	0
20	MF	(Senegal) SEN	Ousseynou Diagné	7	0	1+6	0	0	0
22	MF	(Norway) NOR	Bent Sørmo	30	1	28+2	1	0	0
23	MF	(Norway) NOR	Pål Ulvestad	21	0	8+13	0	0	0
25	GK	(Norway) NOR	Eirik Johansen	8	0	6+2	0	0	0
26	DF	(Norway) NOR	Max Williamsen	2	0	0+2	0	0	0
28	MF	(Norway) NOR	Noah Solskjær	2	0	0+2	0	0	0
29	FW	(Cameroon) CMR	Faris Moumbagna	24	4	10+14	4	0	0
37	MF	(Norway) NOR	Oskar Sivertsen	2	1	0+2	1	0	0
Players away from Kristiansund on loan:
15	DF	(Norway) NOR	Erlend Sivertsen	11	0	5+6	0	0	0
30	GK	(Senegal) SEN	Serigne Mbaye	12	0	12	0	0	0
Players who left Kristiansund during the season

=== Goal scorers ===
Place	Position	Nation	Number	Name	Eliteserien	Norwegian Cup	Total
1	FW	(Norway)	9	Amahl Pellegrino	25	0	25
2	FW	(Norway)	13	Bendik Bye	6	0	6
3	MF	(Sweden)	10	Liridon Kalludra	4	0	4
3	FW	(Cameroon)	29	Faris Moumbagna	4	0	4
5	DF	(Norway)	5	Dan Ulvestad	3	0	3
5	MF	(Norway)	17	Olaus Skarsem	3	0	3
5	MF	(Norway)	7	Sondre Sørli	3	0	3
8	MF	(Ethiopia)	18	Amin Askar	2	0	2
8	DF	(France)	4	Christophe Psyché	2	0	2
10	DF	(Norway)	6	Andreas Hopmark	1	0	1
10	MF	(Norway)	22	Bent Sørmo	1	0	1
10	DF	(Senegal)	19	Aliou Coly	1	0	1
10	MF	(Norway)	37	Oskar Sivertsen	1	0	1
10	DF	(Norway)	3	Christoffer Aasbak	1	0	1
				TOTALS	57	0	57

=== Clean sheets ===
Place	Position	Nation	Number	Name	Eliteserien	Norwegian Cup	Total
1	GK	(Cameroon)	30	Serigne Mbaye	2	0	2
1	GK	(Republic of Ireland)	1	Sean McDermott	2	0	2
3	GK	(Norway)	25	Eirik Johansen	1	0	1
				TOTALS	5	0	5

=== Disciplinary record ===
Number	Nation	Position	Name	Eliteserien		Norwegian Cup		Total	
Number	Nation	Position	Name	Booked	Sent off (straight red)	Booked	Sent off (straight red)	Booked	Sent off (straight red)
3	(Norway)	DF	Christoffer Aasbak	3	0	0	0	3	0
4	(France)	DF	Christophe Psyché	5	1	0	0	5	1
5	(Norway)	DF	Dan Ulvestad	1	0	0	0	1	0
6	(Norway)	DF	Andreas Hopmark	2	0	0	0	2	0
7	(Norway)	MF	Sondre Sørli	1	0	0	0	1	0
8	(Senegal)	MF	Amidou Diop	4	0	0	0	4	0
9	(Norway)	FW	Amahl Pellegrino	1	0	0	0	1	0
10	(Sweden)	MF	Liridon Kalludra	3	0	0	0	3	0
11	(Kosovo)	FW	Flamur Kastrati	4	0	0	0	4	0
17	(Norway)	MF	Olaus Skarsem	3	0	0	0	3	0
18	(Ethiopia)	MF	Amin Askar	2	0	0	0	2	0
19	(Senegal)	DF	Aliou Coly	2	0	0	0	2	0
20	(Senegal)	MF	Ousseynou Diagné	3	0	0	0	3	0
22	(Norway)	MF	Bent Sørmo	1	0	0	0	1	0
23	(Norway)	MF	Pål Ulvestad	2	0	0	0	2	0
29	(Cameroon)	FW	Faris Moumbagna	5	0	0	0	5	0
Players away on loan:
15	(Norway)	DF	Erlend Sivertsen	2	0	0	0	2	0
Players who left Kristiansund during the season:
			TOTALS	44	1	0	0	44	1
