= List of Norwegian football transfers summer 2021 =

This is a list of Norwegian football transfers in the 2021 summer transfer window by club. Only clubs of the 2021 Eliteserien and 2021 1. divisjon are included.

The summer transfer window lasted from 1 August to 31 August. The deadline for signing players on a free transfer was 26 September. In addition, young players up to and including 21 years of age may be loaned until 16 October, and junior players may be promoted to the senior squad at any time.

== Eliteserien ==
=== Bodø/Glimt ===
In: Note: Flags indicate national team as defined under FIFA eligibility rules; some limited exceptions apply. Players may hold more than one non-FIFA nationality.

No.	Pos.	Nation	Player
11	FW	NOR	Amahl Pellegrino (from (Saudi Arabia) Damac)
17	MF	EST	Mattias Käit (from (Slovenia) Domžale)
29	FW	CZE	Tomáš Rataj (on loan from (Czech Republic) Opava)
32	FW	NOR	Joel Mvuka (from Åsane)
42	DF	NOR	Brynjar Johnsplass (promoted from junior squad)
77	FW	GHA	Gilbert Koomson (from (Turkey) Kasımpaşa)
—	MF	NOR	Nicklas Olai Karlsen Sundsvåg (loan return from Fram)

Out: Note: Flags indicate national team as defined under FIFA eligibility rules; some limited exceptions apply. Players may hold more than one non-FIFA nationality.

No.	Pos.	Nation	Player
11	DF	SWE	Axel Lindahl (on loan to (Sweden) Degerfors)
17	FW	TUN	Sebastian Tounekti (on loan to (Netherlands) Groningen)
29	FW	CZE	Tomáš Rataj (loan return to (Czech Republic) Opava)
31	MF	NOR	Kent Malic Swaleh (to Tromsdalen)
35	MF	NOR	Adan Abadala Hussein (on loan to Florø)
37	MF	NOR	Ask Tjærandsen-Skau (on loan to Start, previously on loan at Stjørdals-Blink)

=== Brann ===
In: Note: Flags indicate national team as defined under FIFA eligibility rules; some limited exceptions apply. Players may hold more than one non-FIFA nationality.

No.	Pos.	Nation	Player
3	DF	NOR	Fredrik Pallesen Knudsen (from Haugesund)
5	MF	NOR	Vajebah Sakor (from (Greece) OFI)
8	MF	NOR	Felix Horn Myhre (from Vålerenga)
11	FW	NOR	Bård Finne (from (Denmark) SønderjyskE)
19	MF	NOR	Sivert Heltne Nilsen (from (Belgium) Waasland-Beveren)
26	DF	DEN	Japhet Sery Larsen (from (Denmark) Midtjylland)
27	GK	DEN	Mikkel Andersen (from (Denmark) Midtjylland)
27	DF	NOR	Runar Hove (from Viking)
28	GK	GER	Lennart Grill (on loan from (Germany) Bayer Leverkusen)

Out: Note: Flags indicate national team as defined under FIFA eligibility rules; some limited exceptions apply. Players may hold more than one non-FIFA nationality.

No.	Pos.	Nation	Player
3	DF	NOR	Vegard Forren (to Eide og Omegn)
5	DF	NOR	Thomas Grøgaard (to Strømsgodset)
11	FW	CIV	Daouda Bamba (to (Turkey) Altay)
19	DF	NOR	Jon-Helge Tveita (to Start)
27	GK	DEN	Mikkel Andersen (to (Denmark) Viborg)
29	MF	NOR	Kristoffer Barmen (to Aalesund)
31	MF	NOR	Isak Hjorteseth (on loan to Fyllingsdalen)

=== Haugesund ===
In: Note: Flags indicate national team as defined under FIFA eligibility rules; some limited exceptions apply. Players may hold more than one non-FIFA nationality.

No.	Pos.	Nation	Player
2	DF	GAM	Sulayman Bojang (from Sarpsborg 08)
4	DF	DEN	Anders Bærtelsen (on loan from (Denmark) Vendsyssel)
13	MF	NOR	Martin Samuelsen (from (Denmark) AaB)
16	FW	NOR	Alexander Søderlund (from (Turkey) Çaykur Rizespor)
20	MF	NOR	Torje Naustdal (from Strømmen)
39	MF	NOR	Mathias Tjoland (promoted from junior squad)
—	MF	NOR	Christos Zafeiris (from Grorud)

Out: Note: Flags indicate national team as defined under FIFA eligibility rules; some limited exceptions apply. Players may hold more than one non-FIFA nationality.

No.	Pos.	Nation	Player
4	DF	NOR	Fredrik Pallesen Knudsen (to Brann)
16	MF	CPV	Bruno Leite (to (Cyprus) Pafos)
17	FW	SEN	Ibrahima Wadji (to (Azerbaijan) Qarabağ)
18	MF	NOR	Kristoffer Gunnarshaug (to Ull/Kisa)
19	MF	DEN	Mikkel Desler (to (France) Toulouse)
32	GK	NOR	Frank Stople (on loan to Stjørdals-Blink)
35	FW	NOR	Andreas Endresen (on loan to Vard)
—	MF	NOR	Christos Zafeiris (on loan to Grorud)

=== Kristiansund ===
In: Note: Flags indicate national team as defined under FIFA eligibility rules; some limited exceptions apply. Players may hold more than one non-FIFA nationality.

No.	Pos.	Nation	Player
7	MF	NOR	Jesper Isaksen (from Stabæk)
11	FW	NOR	Moses Mawa (from Strømsgodset)
20	FW	USA	Lagos Kunga (free transfer)
30	GK	SEN	Serigne Mor Mbaye (loan return from Sogndal)
35	DF	NOR	Isak Lein Aalberg (from Steinkjer)
36	DF	NOR	Bendik Brevik (promoted from junior squad)
38	FW	NOR	Marius Weidel (promoted from junior squad)
39	MF	NOR	Heine Gikling Bruseth (promoted from junior squad)
40	GK	NOR	Adrian Sæther (promoted from junior squad)

Out: Note: Flags indicate national team as defined under FIFA eligibility rules; some limited exceptions apply. Players may hold more than one non-FIFA nationality.

No.	Pos.	Nation	Player
7	MF	NOR	Olaus Skarsem (to Rosenborg)
11	FW	NOR	Flamur Kastrati (to Odd)
14	MF	NOR	Horenus Tadesse (to Sandnes Ulf, previously on loan)
20	MF	SEN	Ousseynou Cavin Diagné (released)
22	MF	NOR	Bent Sørmo (to (Belgium) Zulte Waregem)
26	MF	NOR	Max Normann Williamsen (on loan to Levanger)
28	MF	NOR	Noah Solskjær (to Sogndal, previously on loan)
29	FW	CMR	Faris Pemi Moumbagna (on loan to (Denmark) SønderjyskE)

=== Lillestrøm ===
In: Note: Flags indicate national team as defined under FIFA eligibility rules; some limited exceptions apply. Players may hold more than one non-FIFA nationality.

No.	Pos.	Nation	Player
1	GK	NOR	Knut-André Skjærstein (from KFUM)
15	DF	NOR	Josef Baccay (loan return from Kongsvinger)
21	MF	NOR	Magnus Nordengen Knudsen (loan return from Ull/Kisa)
24	DF	SWE	Tom Pettersson (from (United States) FC Cincinnati)
28	MF	NOR	Apipon Tongnoy (loan return from Skeid)
31	MF	NOR	Martin Bergum (promoted from junior squad)
33	MF	NOR	Henrik Skogvold (promoted from junior squad)
40	GK	NOR	Jørgen Sveinhaug (promoted from junior squad)

Out: Note: Flags indicate national team as defined under FIFA eligibility rules; some limited exceptions apply. Players may hold more than one non-FIFA nationality.

No.	Pos.	Nation	Player
1	GK	BEL	Álex Craninx (loan return to Molde)
9	FW	NOR	Kent Håvard Eriksen (to Mjøndalen)
15	DF	NOR	Josef Baccay (on loan to Kongsvinger)
16	MF	NGR	Charles Ezeh (released)
19	FW	NOR	Uranik Seferi (on loan to Skeid)
27	FW	NOR	Alexander Hrcka Sannes (on loan to Strømmen)
–	GK	NOR	Emil Ødegaard (to KFUM, previously on loan at Stjørdals-Blink)

=== Mjøndalen ===
In: Note: Flags indicate national team as defined under FIFA eligibility rules; some limited exceptions apply. Players may hold more than one non-FIFA nationality.

No.	Pos.	Nation	Player
4	DF	SWE	Daniel Janevski (from (Sweden) Degerfors)
14	FW	NOR	Kent Håvard Eriksen (from Lillestrøm)
21	DF	NOR	Herman Kleppa (from Raufoss)
31	MF	SWE	Albin Sporrong (from (Sweden) Västerås)
—	MF	NOR	Daniel Skare (promoted from junior squad)

Out: Note: Flags indicate national team as defined under FIFA eligibility rules; some limited exceptions apply. Players may hold more than one non-FIFA nationality.

No.	Pos.	Nation	Player
2	DF	NOR	Sebastian Sebulonsen (loan return to Viking)
4	DF	NOR	William Sell (to Lyn)
10	MF	DEN	Tonny Brochmann (to (Denmark) AC Horsens)
21	FW	NOR	Alfred Scriven (to Hødd)
22	FW	NGR	Shuaibu Ibrahim (to Jerv)
23	DF	NOR	Sondre Solholm Johansen (to (Scotland) Motherwell)
—	FW	NOR	Gustav Sving Helling (to Ørn)
—	GK	NOR	Gard Thomas (to Asker)

=== Molde ===
In: Note: Flags indicate national team as defined under FIFA eligibility rules; some limited exceptions apply. Players may hold more than one non-FIFA nationality.

No.	Pos.	Nation	Player
12	GK	BEL	Álex Craninx (loan return from Lillestrøm)
17	FW	NOR	Rafik Zekhnini (from (Italy) Fiorentina)
21	DF	NOR	Martin Linnes (from (Turkey) Galatasaray)
27	MF	NOR	Sivert Mannsverk (from Sogndal)
32	FW	NOR	Niklas Edris Haugland (from (England) Leeds U23)

Out: Note: Flags indicate national team as defined under FIFA eligibility rules; some limited exceptions apply. Players may hold more than one non-FIFA nationality.

No.	Pos.	Nation	Player
6	DF	NOR	Stian Gregersen (to (France) Bordeaux)
17	MF	NOR	Fredrik Aursnes (to (Netherlands) Feyenoord)
26	GK	NOR	Mathias Ranmark (on loan to Moss)
27	DF	NOR	Marcus Holmgren Pedersen (to (Netherlands) Feyenoord)
30	FW	CIV	Mathis Bolly (on loan to Stabæk)
32	MF	NOR	Tobias Hestad (on loan to Hødd, previously on loan at Raufoss)
34	GK	NOR	Oliver Petersen (on loan to Grorud)
36	DF	NOR	Adrian Ugelvik (to Brattvåg)

=== Odd ===
In: Note: Flags indicate national team as defined under FIFA eligibility rules; some limited exceptions apply. Players may hold more than one non-FIFA nationality.

No.	Pos.	Nation	Player
3	DF	NOR	Emil Jonassen (from Stabæk)
9	FW	NOR	Flamur Kastrati (from Kristiansund)
17	MF	NOR	Elias Uppheim Skogvoll (loan return from Grorud)
26	FW	SRB	Milan Jevtović (from (Denmark) AGF)

Out: Note: Flags indicate national team as defined under FIFA eligibility rules; some limited exceptions apply. Players may hold more than one non-FIFA nationality.

No.	Pos.	Nation	Player
9	FW	NOR	Mushaga Bakenga (to (Japan) Tokushima Vortis)
19	DF	NOR	Thomas Hallstensen (on loan to Ull/Kisa)

=== Rosenborg ===
In: Note: Flags indicate national team as defined under FIFA eligibility rules; some limited exceptions apply. Players may hold more than one non-FIFA nationality.

No.	Pos.	Nation	Player
6	MF	NOR	Alexander Tettey (from (England) Norwich City)
13	GK	NOR	Julian Faye Lund (loan return from HamKam)
18	FW	NOR	Noah Holm (from (Portugal) Vitória Guimarães)
19	DF	NOR	Adrian Pereira (from (Greece) PAOK)
21	MF	NOR	Olaus Skarsem (from Kristiansund)
23	MF	SWE	Pavle Vagić (from (Sweden) Malmö FF)

Out: Note: Flags indicate national team as defined under FIFA eligibility rules; some limited exceptions apply. Players may hold more than one non-FIFA nationality.

No.	Pos.	Nation	Player
10	FW	SWE	Guillermo Molins (to Sarpsborg 08)
18	MF	NOR	Kristoffer Zachariassen (to (Hungary) Ferencváros)
27	FW	NOR	Ole Sæter (on loan to Ull/Kisa)
37	DF	NOR	Pawel Chrupalla (on loan to Stjørdals-Blink)
38	DF	NOR	Mikkel Ceïde (on loan to Ranheim)

=== Sandefjord ===
In: Note: Flags indicate national team as defined under FIFA eligibility rules; some limited exceptions apply. Players may hold more than one non-FIFA nationality.

No.	Pos.	Nation	Player
4	DF	NED	Ian Smeulers (from (Netherlands) Jong Feyenoord)
10	FW	CRC	Deyver Vega (free transfer)
22	FW	NOR	Moussa Njie (free transfer)
40	MF	NOR	Vetle Walle Egeli (promoted from junior squad)
93	FW	NOR	Chuma Anene (from (Denmark) Midtjylland)

Out: Note: Flags indicate national team as defined under FIFA eligibility rules; some limited exceptions apply. Players may hold more than one non-FIFA nationality.

No.	Pos.	Nation	Player
4	DF	ESP	Enric Vallès (to (Spain) UE Olot)
22	DF	NOR	Herman Solberg Nilsen (on loan to Fram Larvik)
24	MF	NOR	Martin Andersen (released)
92	GK	DEN	Frederik Due (released)

=== Sarpsborg 08 ===
In: Note: Flags indicate national team as defined under FIFA eligibility rules; some limited exceptions apply. Players may hold more than one non-FIFA nationality.

No.	Pos.	Nation	Player
2	DF	NOR	Leo Bech Hermansen (promoted from junior squad)
13	FW	SWE	Guillermo Molins (from Rosenborg)
14	FW	MLI	Amadou Camara (from (Senegal) Oslo FA)
25	MF	DEN	Mikkel Maigaard (from Strømsgodset)
26	FW	BFA	Moubarack Compoaré (from (Senegal) Oslo FA)
77	MF	CRO	Dario Čanađija (from (Romania) Astra Giurgiu)

Out: Note: Flags indicate national team as defined under FIFA eligibility rules; some limited exceptions apply. Players may hold more than one non-FIFA nationality.

No.	Pos.	Nation	Player
2	DF	GAM	Sulayman Bojang (to Haugesund)
13	MF	LBN	Felix Michel Melki (loan return to (Sweden) AIK)
14	MF	ISL	Emil Pálsson (on loan to Sogndal)
19	MF	SEN	Laurent Mendy (on loan to Strømmen)
23	MF	BIH	Emir Derviskadic (to Start)
25	FW	NOR	Steffen Lie Skålevik (on loan to Sogndal)
27	FW	MLI	Aboubacar Konté (on loan to (Portugal) Nacional, previously on loan at Jerv)

=== Stabæk ===
In: Note: Flags indicate national team as defined under FIFA eligibility rules; some limited exceptions apply. Players may hold more than one non-FIFA nationality.

No.	Pos.	Nation	Player
2	DF	DEN	Kasper Pedersen (from (Denmark) Esbjerg)
5	DF	SVK	Ivan Mesík (on loan from (Denmark) Nordsjælland)
7	FW	CIV	Mathis Bolly (on loan from Molde)
8	MF	NOR	Fredrik Haugen (from (Cyprus) AEK Larnaca)
9	FW	NOR	Pål Alexander Kirkevold (from (Denmark) Hobro)
16	MF	NOR	Martin Høyland (from Grorud)
19	DF	SWE	Victor Wernersson (on loan from (Belgium) Mechelen)
20	FW	NOR	Aleksander Andresen (promoted to senior squad, previously on loan at Moss)
26	MF	POR	Tomás Podstawski (from (Poland) Pogoń Szczecin)
29	FW	NOR	Kristoffer Lassen Harrison (promoted from junior squad)
31	DF	NOR	Olav Lilleøren Veum (promoted from junior squad)

Out: Note: Flags indicate national team as defined under FIFA eligibility rules; some limited exceptions apply. Players may hold more than one non-FIFA nationality.

No.	Pos.	Nation	Player
5	DF	NOR	Mats Solheim (retired)
7	MF	NOR	Jesper Isaksen (to Kristiansund, previously on loan at Fredrikstad)
8	MF	KOS	Herolind Shala (to (Turkey) BB Erzurumspor)
9	FW	UKR	Oleksiy Khoblenko (loan return to (Ukraine) Dnipro-1)
14	MF	NOR	Kristian Bernt Torgersen (demoted to junior team)
19	FW	JPN	Kosuke Kinoshita (to (Japan) Urawa Red Diamonds)
21	MF	NOR	Magnus Strandman Lundal (retired)
25	FW	NGR	Uche Great Sabastine (loan return to (Nigeria) Kano Pillars)
26	DF	NOR	Emil Jonassen (to Odd)
30	MF	NOR	Peder Vogt (on loan to Asker)
32	FW	NOR	Antonio Nusa (to (Belgium) Club Brugge)
84	GK	NOR	Jonas Vatne Brauti (to KFUM)

=== Strømsgodset ===
In: Note: Flags indicate national team as defined under FIFA eligibility rules; some limited exceptions apply. Players may hold more than one non-FIFA nationality.

No.	Pos.	Nation	Player
4	DF	NOR	Thomas Grøgaard (from Brann)
16	FW	NGR	Jordan Attah Kadiri (on loan from (Belgium) Lommel)

Out: Note: Flags indicate national team as defined under FIFA eligibility rules; some limited exceptions apply. Players may hold more than one non-FIFA nationality.

No.	Pos.	Nation	Player
4	DF	CMR	Duplexe Tchamba (loan return to (France) Strasbourg)
10	FW	NOR	Moses Mawa (to Kristiansund)
14	DF	NOR	Nico Mickelson (to (Denmark) OB Odense)
20	MF	DEN	Mikkel Maigaard (to Sarpsborg 08)
22	DF	FRA	Prosper Mendy (released)
56	FW	NOR	Mustapha Fofana (on loan to Ørn Horten, previously on loan at Bærum)
64	MF	NOR	Sebastian Pop (on loan to Fram)

=== Tromsø ===
In: Note: Flags indicate national team as defined under FIFA eligibility rules; some limited exceptions apply. Players may hold more than one non-FIFA nationality.

No.	Pos.	Nation	Player
13	FW	CZE	Zdeněk Ondrášek (from (Romania) FCSB)
22	MF	NOR	Sakarias Opsahl (on loan from Vålerenga, then made permanent)
26	DF	NOR	Isak Kjelsrud Vik (promoted from junior squad)
28	DF	FRA	Christophe Psyché (from (Cyprus) AEL Limassol)

Out: Note: Flags indicate national team as defined under FIFA eligibility rules; some limited exceptions apply. Players may hold more than one non-FIFA nationality.

No.	Pos.	Nation	Player
24	FW	NOR	Tobias Hafstad (on loan to Arendal)
29	FW	DEN	Joachim Rothmann (loan return to (Denmark) Nordsjælland)
–	GK	NOR	Erlend Jacobsen (to Brodd, previously on loan at (Faroe Islands) B68)

=== Viking ===
In: Note: Flags indicate national team as defined under FIFA eligibility rules; some limited exceptions apply. Players may hold more than one non-FIFA nationality.

No.	Pos.	Nation	Player
4	DF	SLO	David Brekalo (from (Slovenia) Bravo)
6	DF	NZL	Gianni Stensness (from (Australia) Central Coast Mariners)
17	DF	NOR	Sebastian Sebulonsen (loan return from Mjøndalen)
24	FW	GUI	Mai Traore (from (Sweden) Vasalund)
30	GK	ISL	Patrik Gunnarsson (on loan from (England) Brentford)
40	FW	NOR	Simen Kvia-Egeskog (promoted from junior squad)

Out: Note: Flags indicate national team as defined under FIFA eligibility rules; some limited exceptions apply. Players may hold more than one non-FIFA nationality.

No.	Pos.	Nation	Player
2	DF	NOR	Herman Haugen (on loan to Raufoss)
4	DF	NOR	Tord Salte (to Sogndal, previously on loan)
5	DF	NOR	Henrik Heggheim (to (Denmark) Brøndby)
6	DF	NOR	Runar Hove (to Brann)
19	MF	NOR	Sondre Auklend (on loan to Åsane)
33	DF	NOR	Vebjørn Hagen (on loan to Hødd)
35	MF	NOR	Lars Erik Sødal (on loan to Egersund)

=== Vålerenga ===
In: Note: Flags indicate national team as defined under FIFA eligibility rules; some limited exceptions apply. Players may hold more than one non-FIFA nationality.

No.	Pos.	Nation	Player
5	DF	MKD	Leonard Zuta (from (Italy) Lecce)
6	MF	DEN	Nicolaj Thomsen (from (Denmark) F.C. Copenhagen)
10	FW	SWE	Albin Mörfelt (from (Sweden) Varberg)
21	GK	NOR	Mathias Dyngeland (on loan from (Sweden) Elfsborg)
27	FW	NOR	Jacob Dicko Eng (promoted from junior squad)
38	GK	NOR	Magnus Sjøeng (promoted from junior squad)

Out: Note: Flags indicate national team as defined under FIFA eligibility rules; some limited exceptions apply. Players may hold more than one non-FIFA nationality.

No.	Pos.	Nation	Player
6	MF	NOR	Sakarias Opsahl (on loan to Tromsø)
10	FW	NOR	Aron Dønnum (to (Belgium) Standard Liège)
13	GK	NOR	Kristoffer Klaesson (to (England) Leeds)
23	MF	NOR	Felix Horn Myhre (to Brann)
25	DF	CAN	Sam Adekugbe (to (Turkey) Hatayspor)
33	DF	NOR	Amin Nouri (to Sogndal)

== 1. divisjon ==
=== Aalesund ===
In: Note: Flags indicate national team as defined under FIFA eligibility rules; some limited exceptions apply. Players may hold more than one non-FIFA nationality.

No.	Pos.	Nation	Player
10	FW	DEN	Muamer Brajanac (on loan from (Denmark) Horsens)
29	MF	NOR	Kristoffer Barmen (from Brann)

Out: Note: Flags indicate national team as defined under FIFA eligibility rules; some limited exceptions apply. Players may hold more than one non-FIFA nationality.

No.	Pos.	Nation	Player
2	DF	NED	Shaquill Sno (to (Bulgaria) Lokomotiv Plovdiv)
23	FW	NOR	Torbjørn Agdestein (released)

=== Bryne ===
In: Note: Flags indicate national team as defined under FIFA eligibility rules; some limited exceptions apply. Players may hold more than one non-FIFA nationality.

No.	Pos.	Nation	Player
20	DF	NOR	Sondre Norheim (from (United States) Syracuse Orange)
21	GK	TTO	Nicklas Frenderup (on loan from Ranheim)
26	FW	NOR	Torben Dvergsdal (loan return from Notodden)

Out: Note: Flags indicate national team as defined under FIFA eligibility rules; some limited exceptions apply. Players may hold more than one non-FIFA nationality.

No.	Pos.	Nation	Player
26	FW	NOR	Torben Dvergsdal (on loan to Notodden)
29	MF	NOR	Herman Rugland (on loan to Sola)

=== Fredrikstad ===
In: Note: Flags indicate national team as defined under FIFA eligibility rules; some limited exceptions apply. Players may hold more than one non-FIFA nationality.

No.	Pos.	Nation	Player
17	MF	NOR	Alexander Zoulakis (loan return from Levanger)
24	FW	SWE	Noa Williams (from (Sweden) Brage)
28	DF	NOR	Adnan Hadzic (from Sandnes Ulf)
31	MF	NOR	Jesper Isaksen (on loan from Stabæk)

Out: Note: Flags indicate national team as defined under FIFA eligibility rules; some limited exceptions apply. Players may hold more than one non-FIFA nationality.

No.	Pos.	Nation	Player
3	DF	NOR	Ethan Amundsen-Day (to (Denmark) København U23)
16	FW	DJI	Anas Farah Ali (on loan to Egersund)
17	MF	NOR	Alexander Zoulakis (on loan to Levanger)
31	MF	NOR	Jesper Isaksen (loan return to Stabæk)

=== Grorud ===
In: Note: Flags indicate national team as defined under FIFA eligibility rules; some limited exceptions apply. Players may hold more than one non-FIFA nationality.

No.	Pos.	Nation	Player
12	GK	NOR	Oliver Petersen (on loan from Molde)
23	FW	NOR	Josias Furaha (loan return from Moss)
26	MF	NOR	Christos Zafeiris (on loan from Haugesund)

Out: Note: Flags indicate national team as defined under FIFA eligibility rules; some limited exceptions apply. Players may hold more than one non-FIFA nationality.

No.	Pos.	Nation	Player
6	MF	NOR	Martin Høyland (to Stabæk)
8	MF	NOR	Jonas Pereira (to Ull/Kisa)
18	MF	NOR	Elias Uppheim Skogvoll (loan return to Odd)
23	FW	NOR	Josias Furaha (on loan to Moss)
26	MF	NOR	Christos Zafeiris (to Haugesund)
57	DF	NOR	Fredrik Carson Pedersen (on loan to Notodden)

=== HamKam ===
In: Note: Flags indicate national team as defined under FIFA eligibility rules; some limited exceptions apply. Players may hold more than one non-FIFA nationality.

No.	Pos.	Nation	Player
4	DF	USA	Sam Rogers (on loan from (United States) OKC Energy)
20	FW	NOR	Julian Gonstad (promoted from junior squad)
23	FW	CAN	Theo Bair (on loan from (Canada) Vancouver Whitecaps)
96	GK	GUA	Nicholas Hagen (from (Azerbaijan) Sabail)
73	MF	LAT	Eduards Daškevičs (from (Belgium) Anderlecht U20)

Out: Note: Flags indicate national team as defined under FIFA eligibility rules; some limited exceptions apply. Players may hold more than one non-FIFA nationality.

No.	Pos.	Nation	Player
1	GK	NOR	Lars Jendal (on loan to Arendal)
4	MF	NOR	Erik Olaf Krohnstad (on loan to Lysekloster, previously on loan at Øygarden)
13	DF	ESP	Rubén Alegre (to (Spain) Coria)
19	MF	NOR	Van Za Lian Bawi Hrin (on loan to Elverum)
20	MF	NOR	Jo Nymo Matland (to Lyn)
31	GK	NOR	Julian Faye Lund (loan return to Rosenborg)

=== Jerv ===
In: Note: Flags indicate national team as defined under FIFA eligibility rules; some limited exceptions apply. Players may hold more than one non-FIFA nationality.

No.	Pos.	Nation	Player
11	FW	GER	Felix Schröter (from (Germany) SpVgg Unterhaching)
17	FW	NGR	Shuaibu Ibrahim (from Mjøndalen)
35	MF	NOR	Bendik Kristiansen (promoted from junior squad)
46	DF	NOR	Håkon Krogelien (promoted from junior squad)

Out: Note: Flags indicate national team as defined under FIFA eligibility rules; some limited exceptions apply. Players may hold more than one non-FIFA nationality.

No.	Pos.	Nation	Player
3	DF	NOR	Bjørnar Hove (to Fløy)
13	MF	NOR	Håkon Suggelia (to Birkenes)
15	DF	NGR	Akeem Latifu (released)
21	MF	NOR	Tor Axel Bringsverd (to NTNUI)
23	FW	NOR	Ole Marius Håbestad (to Arendal)
27	FW	MLI	Aboubacar Konté (loan return to Sarpsborg 08)
28	DF	NOR	Jørgen Myhre (to Randesund)
32	MF	NOR	Thomas Liene Ness (on loan to Levanger)

=== KFUM ===
In: Note: Flags indicate national team as defined under FIFA eligibility rules; some limited exceptions apply. Players may hold more than one non-FIFA nationality.

No.	Pos.	Nation	Player
1	GK	NOR	Emil Ødegaard (from Lillestrøm)
4	DF	NOR	Marius Alm (from Raufoss)
16	MF	NOR	Johannes Hummelvoll-Nunez (from Sandnes Ulf)
23	MF	NOR	Kristian Aarstad (promoted from junior squad)
28	GK	NOR	Jonas Vatne Brauti (from Stabæk)

Out: Note: Flags indicate national team as defined under FIFA eligibility rules; some limited exceptions apply. Players may hold more than one non-FIFA nationality.

No.	Pos.	Nation	Player
4	DF	NOR	Jacob Stubberud (retired)
12	GK	NOR	Knut-André Skjærstein (to Lillestrøm)
18	GK	NOR	Alexander Pedersen (to (Iceland) Kórdrengir)
20	MF	NOR	Juba Moula (on loan to Ull/Kisa)
30	DF	NOR	Aksel Baran Potur (on loan to Moss)
—	DF	NOR	Håkon Aalmen (retired)

=== Ranheim ===
In: Note: Flags indicate national team as defined under FIFA eligibility rules; some limited exceptions apply. Players may hold more than one non-FIFA nationality.

No.	Pos.	Nation	Player
16	DF	NOR	Robert Behson-Courage Williams (loan return from Ull/Kisa)
17	DF	NOR	Mikkel Ceïde (on loan from Rosenborg)
24	DF	NOR	Noah Sevaldsen Aarmo (promoted from junior squad)
25	MF	NOR	Adrian Bartel (promoted from junior squad)

Out: Note: Flags indicate national team as defined under FIFA eligibility rules; some limited exceptions apply. Players may hold more than one non-FIFA nationality.

No.	Pos.	Nation	Player
4	DF	NOR	Magnus Lundal (on loan to Stjørdals-Blink)
6	MF	NOR	Magnus Blakstad (retired)
17	FW	NOR	Magnus Høiseth (on loan to Nardo)
24	DF	NOR	Jarl Magnus Knutsen (on loan to Levanger)
92	GK	TTO	Nicklas Frenderup (on loan to Bryne)

=== Raufoss ===
In: Note: Flags indicate national team as defined under FIFA eligibility rules; some limited exceptions apply. Players may hold more than one non-FIFA nationality.

No.	Pos.	Nation	Player
5	DF	NOR	Akinshola Akinyemi (free transfer)
6	MF	NOR	Håkon Butli Hammer (from Nardo)
8	FW	NOR	Markus Johnsgård (from Senja)
13	GK	NOR	Ola Hoel Lervik (on loan from Molde 2)
21	DF	NOR	Herman Haugen (on loan from Viking)

Out: Note: Flags indicate national team as defined under FIFA eligibility rules; some limited exceptions apply. Players may hold more than one non-FIFA nationality.

No.	Pos.	Nation	Player
5	DF	NOR	Marius Alm (to KFUM)
6	MF	DEN	Mikkel Frankoch (to (Denmark) Skive)
8	MF	DEN	Mathias Nygaard (to (Denmark) Hobro)
13	GK	NOR	Ola Hoel Lervik (loan return to Molde 2)
21	DF	NOR	Herman Kleppa (to Mjøndalen)
29	MF	NOR	Tobias Hestad (loan return to Molde)

=== Sandnes Ulf ===
In: Note: Flags indicate national team as defined under FIFA eligibility rules; some limited exceptions apply. Players may hold more than one non-FIFA nationality.

No.	Pos.	Nation	Player
22	MF	NOR	Horenus Tadesse (from Kristiansund, previously on loan)
28	MF	FRO	Gullbrandur í Horni Øregaard (promoted from junior squad)
29	MF	NOR	Elias Ivesdal Årsvoll (promoted from junior squad)
32	FW	NOR	Jonas Brune Aune (promoted from junior squad)

Out: Note: Flags indicate national team as defined under FIFA eligibility rules; some limited exceptions apply. Players may hold more than one non-FIFA nationality.

No.	Pos.	Nation	Player
4	DF	NOR	Kevin Jablinski (to (Faroe Islands) 07 Vestur)
12	GK	NOR	Markus Vassøy Nilsen (on loan to Madla)
14	DF	NOR	Adnan Hadzic (to Fredrikstad)
15	FW	NOR	Matteo Vallotto (to Vidar)
19	MF	NOR	Johannes Hummelvoll-Nunez (to KFUM)

=== Sogndal ===
In: Note: Flags indicate national team as defined under FIFA eligibility rules; some limited exceptions apply. Players may hold more than one non-FIFA nationality.

No.	Pos.	Nation	Player
7	FW	NOR	Steffen Lie Skålevik (on loan from Sarpsborg 08)
8	MF	ISL	Emil Pálsson (on loan from Sarpsborg 08)
20	MF	NOR	Noah Solskjær (from Kristiansund, previously on loan)
24	DF	NOR	Tord Salte (from Viking, previously on loan)
26	MF	ENG	Ronan Darcy (on loan from (England) Bolton Wanderers)
29	DF	EST	Henri Järvelaid (from (Denmark) Vendsyssel)
30	DF	NOR	Amin Nouri (from Vålerenga)

Out: Note: Flags indicate national team as defined under FIFA eligibility rules; some limited exceptions apply. Players may hold more than one non-FIFA nationality.

No.	Pos.	Nation	Player
7	MF	NOR	Sivert Mannsverk (to Molde)
8	MF	NOR	Kristoffer Valsvik (to Start)
23	MF	NOR	Anders Johannessen Nord (on loan to Øygarden)
27	DF	NOR	Adrian Solberg (on loan to Øygarden)
28	FW	NOR	Mathias Sundberg (on loan to Øygarden)
31	GK	SEN	Serigne Mor Mbaye (loan return to Kristiansund)

=== Start ===
In: Note: Flags indicate national team as defined under FIFA eligibility rules; some limited exceptions apply. Players may hold more than one non-FIFA nationality.

No.	Pos.	Nation	Player
8	MF	NOR	Kristoffer Valsvik (from Sogndal)
14	DF	NED	Luc Mares (from (Netherlands) MVV)
18	DF	NOR	Jon-Helge Tveita (from Brann)
20	FW	ENG	Cameron Cresswell (from (England) Derby County)
24	MF	BIH	Emir Derviskadic (from Sarpsborg 08)
28	MF	NOR	Ask Tjærandsen-Skau (on loan from Bodø/Glimt)
30	DF	GEQ	Basilio Ndong (on loan from (Belgium) Westerlo)
43	DF	NOR	Lyder Daland (promoted from junior squad)
64	MF	NOR	Levi Eftevaag (promoted from junior squad)

Out: Note: Flags indicate national team as defined under FIFA eligibility rules; some limited exceptions apply. Players may hold more than one non-FIFA nationality.

No.	Pos.	Nation	Player
2	DF	NOR	Jesper Daland (to (Belgium) Cercle Brugge)
19	FW	NOR	Emil Grønn Pedersen (on loan to Fløy)
23	FW	DEN	Sebastian Buch Jensen (loan return to (Denmark) Midtjylland)

=== Stjørdals-Blink ===
In: Note: Flags indicate national team as defined under FIFA eligibility rules; some limited exceptions apply. Players may hold more than one non-FIFA nationality.

No.	Pos.	Nation	Player
1	GK	NOR	Frank Stople (on loan from Haugesund)
3	DF	NOR	Dejan Corovic (from Fløy)
4	DF	NOR	Magnus Lundal (on loan from Ranheim)
20	MF	NOR	Asle Ertsgaard Hastadklev (promoted from junior squad)
28	DF	NOR	Pawel Chrupalla (on loan from Rosenborg)
33	GK	SWE	Albin Svensson (from Nardo)
45	MF	NOR	Karl Martin Rolstad (loan return from Nardo)
70	GK	CAN	David Paulmin (from Egersund)

Out: Note: Flags indicate national team as defined under FIFA eligibility rules; some limited exceptions apply. Players may hold more than one non-FIFA nationality.

No.	Pos.	Nation	Player
1	GK	NOR	Emil Ødegaard (loan return to Lillestrøm)
5	MF	NOR	Anders Nygaard (to Eik Tønsberg)
22	MF	NOR	Patrik Dønheim Hjelmseth (to Sandviken, previously on loan at Nardo)
30	FW	NOR	Jakob Rømo Skille (on loan to Nardo)
37	MF	NOR	Ask Tjærandsen-Skau (loan return to Bodø/Glimt)
45	MF	NOR	Karl Martin Rolstad (on loan to Nardo)

=== Strømmen ===
In: Note: Flags indicate national team as defined under FIFA eligibility rules; some limited exceptions apply. Players may hold more than one non-FIFA nationality.

No.	Pos.	Nation	Player
6	MF	NOR	Sander Amble Haugen (from Sotra)
14	MF	NOR	Marius Hagen (from (Faroe Islands) 07 Vestur)
18	FW	NOR	Alexander Hrcka Sannes (on loan from Lillestrøm)
19	FW	NOR	Magnus Lankhof-Dahlby (free transfer)
21	DF	NOR	Jonathan Lein Valberg (loan return from Moss)
44	MF	SEN	Laurent Mendy (on loan from Sarpsborg 08)

Out: Note: Flags indicate national team as defined under FIFA eligibility rules; some limited exceptions apply. Players may hold more than one non-FIFA nationality.

No.	Pos.	Nation	Player
6	MF	NOR	Torje Naustdal (to Haugesund)
9	FW	CUB	Willian Pozo-Venta (to Notodden)
10	MF	NOR	Mustapha Achrifi (on loan to Lørenskog)
14	FW	NOR	Walid Idrissi (to Moss)
21	DF	NOR	Jonathan Lein Valberg (on loan to Moss)
30	GK	NOR	Marcus Dyngeland (on loan to Årdal)

=== Ull/Kisa ===
In: Note: Flags indicate national team as defined under FIFA eligibility rules; some limited exceptions apply. Players may hold more than one non-FIFA nationality.

No.	Pos.	Nation	Player
4	DF	NOR	Thomas Hallstensen (on loan from Odd)
10	FW	NOR	Ole Sæter (on loan from Rosenborg)
17	MF	NOR	Kristoffer Gunnarshaug (from Haugesund)
19	MF	NOR	Jonas Pereira (from Grorud)
21	MF	NOR	Juba Moula (on loan from KFUM)

Out: Note: Flags indicate national team as defined under FIFA eligibility rules; some limited exceptions apply. Players may hold more than one non-FIFA nationality.

No.	Pos.	Nation	Player
3	DF	NOR	Robert Behson-Courage Williams (loan return to Ranheim)
21	MF	NOR	Sebastian Remme Berge (to Arendal)
23	DF	NOR	Sindre Engja Rindal (on loan to Sotra)
24	MF	NOR	Elias Solberg (to (Italy) Juventus U20)
28	MF	NOR	Magnus Nordengen Knudsen (loan return to Lillestrøm)

=== Åsane ===
In: Note: Flags indicate national team as defined under FIFA eligibility rules; some limited exceptions apply. Players may hold more than one non-FIFA nationality.

No.	Pos.	Nation	Player
7	MF	NOR	Sondre Auklend (on loan from Viking)
12	DF	NOR	Håvard Foldnes (loan return from Sotra)
14	MF	NOR	Jonas Tillung Fredriksen (loan return from Øygarden)
50	MF	NOR	Henrik Gjerde Ødemark (from Brann 2)

Out: Note: Flags indicate national team as defined under FIFA eligibility rules; some limited exceptions apply. Players may hold more than one non-FIFA nationality.

No.	Pos.	Nation	Player
7	FW	NOR	Kristoffer Stava (to Vard)
13	GK	NOR	Thomas Hille (on loan to Sandviken)
19	MF	NOR	Simen Helland Lassen (retired)
22	FW	NOR	Joel Mvuka (to Bodø/Glimt)
