= Oskar Sivertsen =

Norwegian footballer (born 2004)

Personal information
- Full name: Oskar Siira Sivertsen
- Date of birth: 15 February 2004 (age 22)
- Place of birth: Norway
- Height: 1.77 m (5 ft 10 in)
- Position: Forward

Team information
- Current team: Go Ahead Eagles
- Number: 11

Youth career
- Dahle
- Kristiansund

Senior career*
Years	Team	Apps	(Gls)
2019–2023	Kristiansund 2	32	(14)
2020–2025	Kristiansund	62	(11)
2022	→ Hødd (loan)	5	(0)
2022	→ Hødd 2 (loan)	3	(0)
2025–	Go Ahead Eagles	31	(0)

International career^{‡}
2019	Norway U15	3	(1)
2020	Norway U16	3	(0)
2021	Norway U17	4	(1)
2022	Norway U18	12	(2)
2023	Norway U19	9	(0)
2023	Norway U20	3	(1)
2025–	Norway U21	2	(0)
- * Club domestic league appearances and goals as of 23 October 2026 ‡ National team caps and goals as of 6 June 2025

Oskar Siira Sivertsen (born 15 February 2004) is a Norwegian professional footballer who plays as a forward for Eredivisie club Go Ahead Eagles.

== Club career ==
A youth academy graduate of Kristiansund, Sivertsen made his professional debut on 22 August 2020 in a 4–1 league win against Sarpsborg 08. He came on as an 89th-minute substitute for Liridon Kalludra and scored his first goal five minutes later.

On 4 February 2025, Sivertsen signed a three-and-a-half-season contract with Go Ahead Eagles in the Netherlands.

== International career ==
Sivertsen is a current Norwegian youth national team player.

== Career statistics ==
=== Club ===
As of 27 October 2026

Appearances and goals by club, season and competition
Club	Season	League			National Cup		Europe		Other		Total	
Club	Season	Division	Apps	Goals	Apps	Goals	Apps	Goals	Apps	Goals	Apps	Goals
Kristiansund	2020	Eliteserien	2	1	—		—		—		2	1
Kristiansund	2021	Eliteserien	5	1	3	1	—		—		8	2
Kristiansund	2022	Eliteserien	2	0	0	0	—		—		2	0
Kristiansund	2023	OBOS-ligaen	23	3	2	0	—		4 (Note: Appearances in the Eliteserien play-offs)	1	29	4
Kristiansund	2024	Eliteserien	28	5	3	0	—		0	0	31	5
Kristiansund	Total		60	10	8	1	—		4	1	72	11
Hødd	2022	PostNord-ligaen	5	0	1	2	—		—		6	2
Go Ahead Eagles	2024–25	Eredivisie	7	0	1	0	—		—		8	0
Go Ahead Eagles	2025–26	Eredivisie	15	0	2	0	3 (Note: Appearances in UEFA Europa League)	0	0	0	20	0
Go Ahead Eagles	2026–27	Eredivisie	9	0	1	0	—		—		10	0
Go Ahead Eagles	Total		31	0	4	0	3	0	0	0	38	0
Career total			96	10	13	3	3	0	4	1	116	13

== Honours ==
Go Ahead Eagles

- KNVB Cup: 2024–25

Individual

- Norwegian First Division Young Player of the Month: October 2023
- Eliteserien Young Player of the Month: April 2024
