= Agon Muçolli =

Danish-Albanian footballer (born 1998)

Personal information
- Full name: Agon Fatmir Muçolli
- Date of birth: 26 September 1998 (age 28)
- Place of birth: Fredericia, Denmark
- Height: 1.72 m (5 ft 8 in)
- Position: Left winger

Team information
- Current team: Llapi
- Number: 98

Youth career
- 2004–2012: Fredericia
- 2012–2017: Vejle

Senior career*
Years	Team	Apps	(Gls)
2016–2019	Vejle	31	(4)
2019–2021	Fredericia	49	(16)
2021–2022	Kristiansund	35	(5)
2022–2024	OB	10	(0)
2023	→ Varbergs BoIS (loan)	6	(0)
2024–2026	Fredericia	44	(8)
2026–	Llapi	3	(0)

International career
2013–2014	Denmark U16	9	(0)
2014–2015	Denmark U17	9	(0)
2016	Denmark U19	2	(0)
2017	Albania U20	1	(0)
- * Club domestic league appearances and goals as of 10 December 2025

Agon Fatmir Muçolli (born 26 September 1998) is a professional footballer who plays as a left winger for Kosovo Superleague club Llapi. Born in Denmark, he has represented both Denmark and Albania at the youth level.

== Career ==
Muçolli was born in Fredericia, Denmark, to ethnic Albanian parents from Podujevo, Kosovo. He began his career with local club Fredericia before signing a professional contract with Vejle in 2016.

In May 2026, Muçolli signed a two-year contract with Kosovo Superleague club Llapi.

=== International career ===
Muçolli was capped by Denmark at under-16, under-17, and under-19 levels between 2013 and 2016. In 2016, Muçolli stated that he would switch to play either for the Albania national youth team or Kosovo, rather than the Danish youth team. Eventually he took a place on the Albanian team. In September 2017, the Albania national under-21 teams coach Alban Bushi confirmed that both Muçolli's brothers would join the team as well, brokered by fellow U21 international Ylber Ramadani, a recent arrival in Vejle. Muçolli was invited along his brother Arbnor to play for the Albania national under-20 team by Bushi for a friendly match against Georgia on 14 November 2017, though Arbnor had to withdraw due to an injury. He received Albanian citizenship on the day of the match to become eligible to play as "red and black". He subsequently started for Albania U20 against Georgia, losing 0–3. Bushi stated that the match had been a test match to try out players for the upper under-21 side.

== Career statistics ==
=== Club ===
As of match played 8 September 2026

Appearances and goals by club, season and competition
Club	Season	League			Cup (Note: Includes Danish Cup, Norwegian Football Cup)		Other		Total	
Club	Season	Division	Apps	Goals	Apps	Goals	Apps	Goals	Apps	Goals
Vejle	2015–16	Danish 1st Division	1	0	1	0	—		1	0
Vejle	2016–17	Danish 1st Division	24	4	2	0	—		24	4
Vejle	2017–18	Danish 1st Division	6	0	2	0	—		6	0
Vejle	2018–19	Danish Superliga	0	0	0	0	—		0	0
Vejle	Total		31	4	5	0	0	0	36	4
FC Fredericia	2018–19	Danish 1st Division	9	2	0	0	—		9	2
FC Fredericia	2019–20	Danish 1st Division	28	9	1	0	—		29	9
FC Fredericia	2020–21	Danish 1st Division	12	5	0	0	—		12	5
FC Fredericia	Total		49	16	1	0	0	0	50	16
Kristiansund	2021	Eliteserien	26	4	1	0	—		27	4
Kristiansund	2022	Eliteserien	9	1	0	0	—		9	1
Kristiansund	Total		35	5	1	0	0	0	36	5
OB	2022–23	Danish Superliga	10	0	1	0	—		11	0
Varbergs BoIS (loan)	2023	Allsvenskan	6	0	0	0	—		6	0
FC Fredericia	2024–25	Danish 1st Division	28	4	3	2	—		29	4
FC Fredericia	2025–26	Danish Superliga	16	4	2	0	—		18	4
FC Fredericia	Total		44	8	5	2	0	0	49	11
Llapi	2026–27	Kosovo Superleague	3	0	0	0	—		3	0
Career total			178	33	13	2	0	0	191	35

== Honours ==
Vejle

- Danish 1st Division: 2017–18
