= Snorre Strand-Nilsen =

Norwegian footballer (born 1997)

Personal information
- Date of birth: 14 January 1997 (age 29)
- Place of birth: Gjøvik, Norway
- Position: Defender

Team information
- Current team: HamKam
- Number: 22

Youth career
- 2002–2012: Gjøvik-Lyn
- 2013: Raufoss
- 2013–2016: Portsmouth

Senior career*
Years	Team	Apps	(Gls)
2016	Gjøvik-Lyn	8	(0)
2017–2020	Raufoss	83	(12)
2021–2023	Kristiansund	84	(9)
2024–	HamKam	53	(2)
- * Club domestic league appearances and goals as of 23 July 2026

Snorre Strand-Nilsen (born 14 January 1997) is a Norwegian professional footballer who plays as a right back for HamKam.

== Career ==
He is a son of Harald Christian Strand Nilsen and hails from Gjøvik. He started his career in Gjøvik-Lyn at the age of 5, moving on to Raufoss after the 2012 season and to the English club Portsmouth's academy in the summer of 2013.

He returned to Norway in the summer of 2016 and the senior team of Gjøvik-Lyn. From 2017 to 2020 he played for Raufoss again, helping them cement a spot in the 1. divisjon, before he was signed by Kristiansund BK ahead of the 2021 season. He made his Eliteserien debut in May 2021 against Molde. One week later, he scored his first Eliteserien goal against Vålerenga.

== Career statistics ==
As of 3 August 2025

Appearances and goals by club, season and competition
Club	Season	League			National cup		Other		Total	
Club	Season	Division	Apps	Goals	Apps	Goals	Apps	Goals	Apps	Goals
Gjøvik-Lyn	2016	PostNord-ligaen	8	0	0	0	—		8	0
Gjøvik-Lyn	Total		8	0	0	0	—		8	0
Raufoss	2017	PostNord-ligaen	15	1	0	0	2 (Note: Appearances in the PostNord-ligaen promotional play-offs)	1	17	2
Raufoss	2018	PostNord-ligaen	24	3	1	1	—		25	4
Raufoss	2019	OBOS-ligaen	26	7	2	1	—		28	8
Raufoss	2020	OBOS-ligaen	18	1	—		1 (Note: Appearances in the Eliteserien play-offs)	0	19	1
Raufoss	Total		83	12	3	2	3	1	89	15
Kristiansund	2021	Eliteserien	28	6	3	0	—		31	6
Kristiansund	2022	Eliteserien	30	1	2	0	—		32	1
Kristiansund	2023	OBOS-ligaen	26	1	2	0	4	0	32	1
Kristiansund	Total		84	8	7	0	4	0	95	8
HamKam	2024	Eliteserien	23	1	1	0	0	0	24	1
HamKam	2025	Eliteserien	15	1	3	0	—		18	1
HamKam	Total		38	2	4	0	0	0	42	2
Career Total			213	22	14	2	7	1	234	25
