= Dan Peter Ulvestad =

Norwegian footballer (born 1989)

Personal information
- Full name: Dan Peter Ulvestad
- Date of birth: 4 April 1989 (age 37)
- Place of birth: Ålesund, Norway
- Position: Defender

Team information
- Current team: Kristiansund
- Number: 5

Youth career
- Herd

Senior career*
Years	Team	Apps	(Gls)
2010–2011	Aalesund	7	(0)
2012–2013	Herd	23	(5)
2013–	Kristiansund	330	(23)
- * Club domestic league appearances and goals as of 23 July 2026

Dan Peter Ulvestad (born 4 April 1989) is a Norwegian footballer who plays for Eliteserien club Kristiansund.

== Career statistics ==
=== Club ===
As of 6 June 2025

Appearances and goals by club, season and competition
Club	Season	League			National Cup		Other		Total	
Club	Season	Division	Apps	Goals	Apps	Goals	Apps	Goals	Apps	Goals
Aalesund	2010	Tippeligaen	7	0	0	0	—		7	0
Aalesund	Total		7	0	0	0	—		7	0
Herd	2011	Fair Play ligaen	3	0	0	0	—		3	0
Herd	2012	3. divisjon	20	5	1	0	—		21	5
Herd	Total		23	5	1	0	—		24	5
Kristiansund	2013	Adeccoligaen	18	1	1	0	—		19	1
Kristiansund	2014	1. divisjon	27	1	1	0	1 (Note: Appearances in the Tippeligaen play-offs)	0	29	1
Kristiansund	2015	OBOS-ligaen	25	6	3	0	2	0	30	6
Kristiansund	2016	OBOS-ligaen	30	0	1	0	—		31	0
Kristiansund	2017	Eliteserien	28	0	4	0	—		32	0
Kristiansund	2018	Eliteserien	27	4	2	0	—		29	4
Kristiansund	2019	Eliteserien	25	0	2	0	—		27	0
Kristiansund	2020	Eliteserien	22	3	—		—		22	3
Kristiansund	2021	Eliteserien	21	1	1	0	—		22	1
Kristiansund	2022	Eliteserien	18	1	0	0	—		18	1
Kristiansund	2023	OBOS-ligaen	25	4	1	0	3 (Note: Appearances in Eliteserien play-offs)	2	29	6
Kristiansund	2024	Eliteserien	22	1	0	0	0	0	22	1
Kristiansund	2025	Eliteserien	11	0	1	0	0	0	12	0
Kristiansund	Total		299	22	17	0	6	2	322	24
Career total			329	27	18	0	6	2	353	29
