= Eirik Holmen Johansen =

Norwegian footballer (born 1992)

APE Holmen Johansen
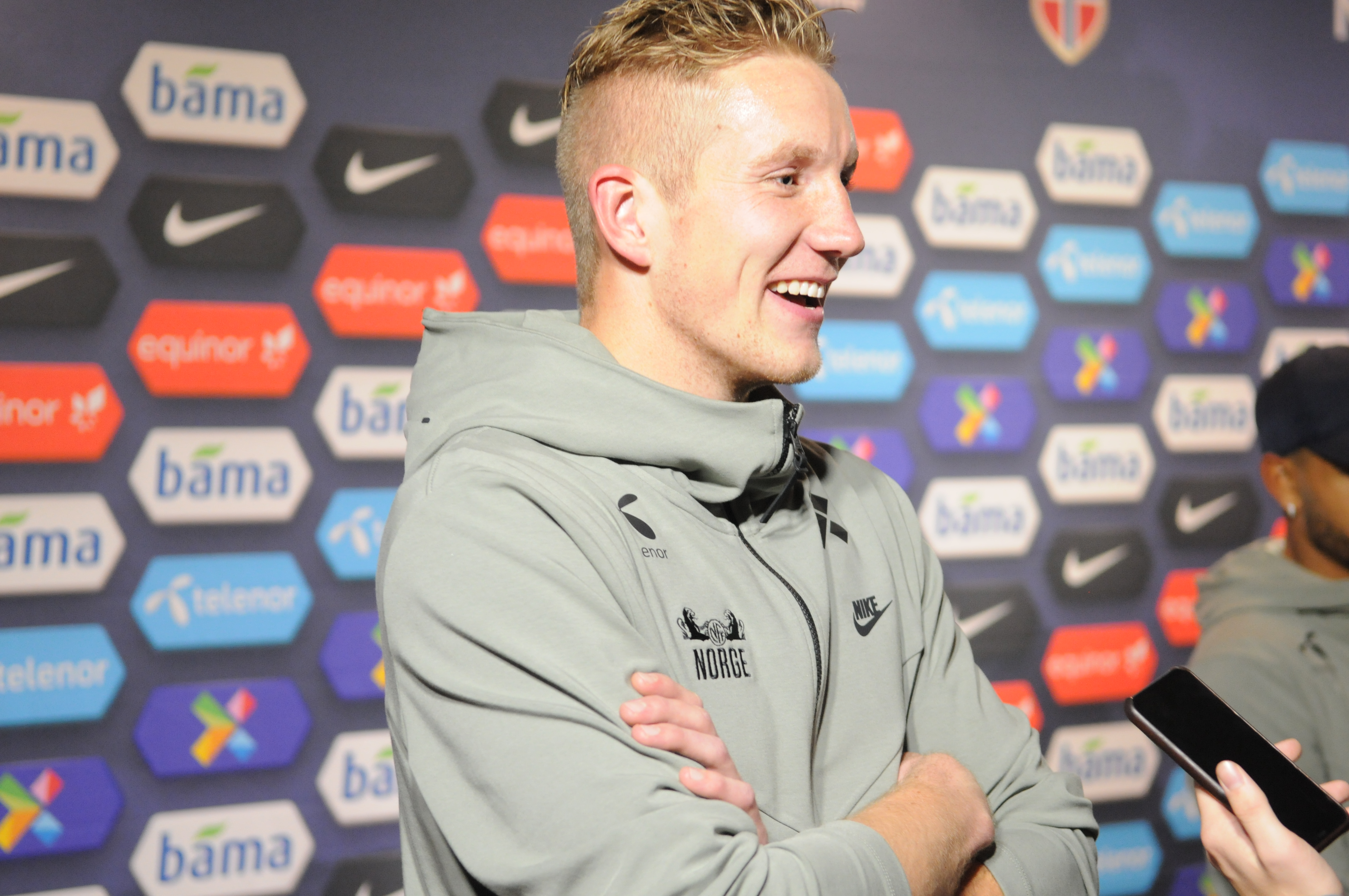
- Johansen being interviewed by in the press zone at the Ullevaal Stadion after the international match against Slovenia on 13 October 2018.

Personal information
- Full name: Eirik Holmen Johansen
- Date of birth: 12 July 1992 (age 34)
- Place of birth: Tønsberg, Norway
- Height: 2.01 m (6 ft 7 in)
- Position: Goalkeeper

Team information
- Current team: Strømsgodset
- Number: 24

Youth career
- –2008: Teie
- 2008–2012: Manchester City

Senior career*
Years	Team	Apps	(Gls)
2012–2015	Manchester City	0	(0)
2013	→ Scunthorpe United (loan)	8	(0)
2014	→ Sandefjord (loan)	28	(0)
2015–2017	New York City	5	(0)
2015	→ Wilmington Hammerheads (loan)	1	(0)
2017–2018	Sandefjord	29	(0)
2019–2023	Brann	11	(0)
2020	→ Kristiansund (loan)	8	(0)
2024	Eik Tønsberg	0	(0)
2024	Brann	0	(0)
2025–	Strømsgodset	3	(0)

International career^{‡}
2007	Norway U-15	3	(0)
2008	Norway U-16	4	(0)
2009	Norway U-17	6	(0)
2010	Norway U-18	6	(0)
2011	Norway U-19	6	(0)
2011–2014	Norway U-21	8	(0)
2012	Norway U-23	1	(0)
- * Club domestic league appearances and goals as of 22 June 2025 ‡ National team caps and goals as of 3 July 2020

Eirik Holmen Johansen (born 12 July 1992) is a Norwegian professional footballer who plays as a goalkeeper for Strømsgodset. Johansen played for Teie IF in his native Norway before joining the Manchester City Academy system at the age of 16. Johansen has represented Norway at youth international level.

== Club career ==
=== Manchester City ===
Hailing from Nøtterøy Municipality outside Tønsberg, Johansen made his debut for Teie IF in the 4. Divisjon at the age of 14. After training with the Tippeligaen sides Sandefjord and Odd Grenland, he was invited on a trial with Manchester City. After Johansen got a fracture in the foot before his trial, his family managed to get a trial with his brother Tobias instead, who also plays as a goalkeeper. Tobias impressed in the trial and got a contract with Manchester City. Johansen later got a new trial with City, and when he joined the Manchester City Academy in August 2008, their mother and two younger brothers also moved to England. Tobias returned to Norway and Kongsvinger in 2010, leaving him alone in England.

Johansen was training regularly with City's first team in the 2010–11 season, and signed a new two-year contract with the club in May 2011. Johansen made his debut for the first team when he played seven minutes of the friendly match against League of Ireland XI on 30 July 2011. After playing regularly for the reserves during the 2011–12 season, Johansen signed a professional contract with the club in July 2012, signing a three–year contract extension. Johansen played a number of pre-season friendlies ahead of the 2012–13 season, and started the season on the bench during Manchester City's FA Community Shield win against Chelsea. He spent most of the season playing in the reserve team for the next seven months.

On 7 March 2013, Johansen joined League One side Scunthorpe United on a one month loan deal as cover for the injured number one 'keeper Sam Slocombe, who was out for six weeks with a torn thigh muscle. Two days later on 9 March 2013, he made his debut for the club, starting the whole game, a 1–2 home defeat against Coventry City. Johansen then started in the next seven matches for Scunthorpe United. On 2 April 2013, his loan spell with the club was extended for the rest of the season. But after Slocombe returned from injury, he returned back to Scunthorpe United’s remaining matches of the 2012–13 season. At the 2012–13 season, Johansen went on to make eight appearances in all competitions.

Following his loan spell at Scunthorpe United, Johansen remained as the club’s fourth choice goalkeeper and signed a three–year contract extension. On 20 January 2014, he joined Norwegian club Sandefjord on a six-month loan-deal, reuniting with his old goalkeeping-coach from Teie, Hans Petter Olsen and the club stated that they wanted him as their new first-choice goalkeeper, as the first-choice in the previous season, Iven Austbø, had transferred to Viking. Prior to the move, Johansen was also linked with a move to Scottish Premiership side Ross County, but the move fell through.

Having not started in goal for the first two league matches, he made his debut for Sandefjord, starting the whole game, in a 2–2 draw against Atla on 20 April 2014. Since joining the club, Johansen quickly established himself as the Sandefjord’s first choice goalkeeper. This led to him extending the club extending his loan spell for the rest of the season. At the end of the 2014 season, he went on to make twenty–nine appearances in all competitions. Following this, Johansen returned to his parent club when his loan spell at Sandefjord ended.

=== New York City FC ===
On 31 March 2015 Johansen signed with Major League Soccer club New York City. He was loaned to NYCFC's United Soccer League affiliate club Wilmington Hammerheads on 11 May 2015. Johansen made one appearance for the side before returning to his parent club. Johansen made his NYCFC debut on 17 June 2015, starting in a US Open Cup 2(3) - 2(4) loss on penalty kicks against the New York Cosmos. This turns out to be his only appearance in the 2015 season.

Johansen made his second appearance for the club, in a 1–0 loss in the US Open Cup against the New York Cosmos, on 15 June. Having been placed on the substitute bench behind Josh Saunders, it wasn’t until on 23 October 2016 when he made his first league appearance, starting in a 4–1 win over Columbus Crew, in the season finale. After the match, Johansen said: "I haven’t seen through too many of the clips yet but to get the start with the first save down to my left was good. When you haven’t played in a long time regularly, you can be a bit edgy because obviously you want to go out and impress. Sometimes that leads to you chasing the game which can lead to bad decisions and mistakes. That save settled me down early into the game and then it was good. On a personal note, it was a pretty decent game for me." Six days later on 30 October 2016, he started NYCFC's first ever playoff, in a 0–2 loss to Toronto in the first leg. Johansen, once again, started in the club’s return leg play–off against Toronto, as the club lost 5–0. At the end of the 2016 season, he went on to make four appearances in all competitions.

Ahead of the 2017 season, Johansen and his NYCFC teammates Jack Harrison and Ronald Matarrita earned U.S. green cards. Since the start of the 2017 season, he continued to remain on the substitute bench behind new signing Sean Johnson. After Johnson’ absent due to his international commitment at the CONCACAF Gold Cup, Johansen made his first appearance of the season, starting the whole game, in a 3–1 win against Minnesota United on 29 June 2017. In a follow–up match, he made another appearance for the club against Vancouver Whitecaps, as the club lost 3–2. Following Johnson’s return, Johansen returned back to the substitute bench for the rest of the 2017 season and he went on to make two appearances in all competitions. Following this, Johansen was released by NYCFC on 27 November 2017.

=== Sandefjord ===
In December 2017, Johansen re-joined Sandefjord on a permanent contract, signing for two years at the club. Upon joining Sandefjord, he said he joined the club in hopes of getting a call up from the senior team.

Johansen made his second debut for Sandefjord, starting the whole game, as the club lost 5–0 against Molde in the opening game of the season. Since joining Sandefjord, he quickly became the club’s first choice goalkeeper once again. However, Johansen was unable to help Sandefjord Fotball avoid relegation after the club drew 1–1 against Sarpsborg 08 on 11 November 2018. Despite missing two matches throughout the 2018 season due to Ingvar Jónsson in goal, he went on to make thirty appearances in all competitions.

=== SK Brann ===
On 9 January 2019, Johansen signed with SK Brann on a four-year contract. Upon joining the club, he was given a number twelve shirt ahead of the Eliteserien.

Johansen made his debut for SK Brann, starting out as the club’s first choice goalkeeper, in a 3–2 loss against Odds in the opening game of the season. This was followed up by starting in the next two matches against Strømsgodset and Kristiansund. But following the return of Håkon Opdal, he was demoted to SK Brann’s second choice goalkeeper for the rest of the season. Despite this, Johansen was featured three times in the club’s matches in the Norwegian Football Cup. At the end of the 2019 season, he went on to make six appearances in all competitions.

==== Kristiansund BK (loan) ====
On 15 June 2020, Johansen signed a loan deal with Kristiansund for the rest of the 2020 season. He previously expressed his desire to leave Brann to get first team football.

Johansen made his debut for the club, starting the whole game, in a 2–2 draw against Haugesund on 24 June 2020. Initially, he competed with Serigne Mbaye over the first choice goalkeeper for the next three months, which either of them placed on the substitute bench. Despite Mbaye was loaned out, Johansen continued to remain as Kristiansund’s second choice goalkeeper behind Sean McDermott for the rest of the 2020 season. At the end of the 2020 season, he went on to make eight appearances in all competitions. Following this, Johansen returned to his parent club.

== International career ==
Johansen has represented Norway at various youth levels, starting out with Norway U-15 and made three appearances. The following year in 2008, he was called up to the Norway U-16 squad and went on to make four appearances. The following year in 2009, Johansen was called up to the Norway U-17 squad and went on to make six appearances. The following year in 2010, he was called up to the Norway U-18 squad and went on to make six appearances.

The following year in 2011, Johansen was called up to the Norway U-19 squad and went on to make six appearances. Later in the year, he was called up to the Norway U-21 squad for the first time. Johansen made his U21 debut, starting the whole game, in a 2–0 win against Azerbaijan U21 on 6 October 2011. After a year absent, he was called up to the Norway U21 squad in February 2013 and made an appearance against Turkey U21, losing 2–0. Johansen later made three more appearances for the U21 side by the end of the year. He went on to make eight appearances for Norway U21 between 2011 and 2014. In June 2012, Johansen was called up to the Norway U-23 squad and made his only appearance, coming against Wales C on 5 June 2012. Prior to this, he trained with the senior team in the absence of regular goalkeepers Espen Bugge Pettersen and Rune Jarstein.

In October 2018, Johansen was called up to the senior team for the first time against Bulgaria but did not play.

== Career statistics ==
=== Club ===
As of match played 13 July 2025

Appearances and goals by club, season and competition
Club	Season	League			National Cup		Europe		Other		Total	
Club	Season	Division	Apps	Goals	Apps	Goals	Apps	Goals	Apps	Goals	Apps	Goals
Manchester City	2012–13	Premier League	0	0	0	0	-		-		0	0
Scunthorpe United (loan)	2012–13	League One	8	0	0	0	-		-		8	0
Sandefjord (loan)	2014	1. divisjon	28	0	1	0	-		-		29	0
Wilmington Hammerheads (loan)	2015	USL	1	0	0	0	-		-		1	0
New York City	2015	MLS	0	0	1	0	-		-		1	0
New York City	2016	MLS	3	0	3	0	-		-		6	0
New York City	2017	MLS	2	0	0	0	-		-		2	0
New York City	Total		5	0	4	0	-	-	-	-	9	0
Sandefjord	2018	Eliteserien	29	0	1	0	-		-		30	0
Brann	2019	Eliteserien	3	0	1	0	-		-		4	0
Brann	2021	Eliteserien	5	0	0	0	-		-		5	0
Brann	2022	OBOS-ligaen	0	0	3	0	-		-		3	0
Brann	2023	Eliteserien	2	0	0	0	-		-		2	0
Brann	2024	Eliteserien	0	0	2	0	-		-		2	0
Brann	Total		10	0	6	0	-	-	-	-	16	0
Kristiansund (loan)	2020	Eliteserien	8	0	0	0	-		-		8	0
Strømsgodset	2025	Eliteserien	3	0	2	0	-		-		5	0
Career total			92	0	14	0	-	-	-	-	106	0

== Honours ==
Manchester City

- FA Community Shield: 2012

Sandefjord Fotball

- 1. Division Norway: 2014
