= Noah Solskjær =

Norwegian footballer (born 2000)

Personal information
- Date of birth: 9 June 2000 (age 26)
- Place of birth: Kristiansund, Norway
- Position: Forward

Team information
- Current team: Stjørdals-Blink
- Number: 9

Youth career
- 2013–2017: Clausenengen

Senior career*
Years	Team	Apps	(Gls)
2017–2019	Kristiansund 2	22	(3)
2020–2021	Kristiansund	3	(0)
2021	→ Sogndal (loan)	6	(0)
2021	→ Sogndal 2 (loan)	10	(0)
2022–2023	Spjelkavik	37	(22)
2022	Spjelkavik 2	1	(0)
2024–2025	Aalesund	8	(0)
2024	Aalesund 2	5	(0)
2025	→ Brattvåg (loan)	5	(0)
2025–	Stjørdals-Blink	23	(3)
- * Club domestic league appearances and goals as of 15 November 2026

Noah Solskjær (born 9 June 2000) is a Norwegian footballer who plays as a forward for Stjørdals-Blink. He is the son of former footballer Ole Gunnar Solskjær.

== Career ==
Solskjær began his footballing career in the youth teams at Clausenengen, the same club his father began his career at. After playing for the B team, he made his debut for the Kristiansund first team in a friendly on 30 July 2019 against Manchester United, managed by father Ole Gunnar Solskjær.

On 9 September 2020, Solskjær signed his first professional contract with Kristiansund, until December 2021, having been part of their academy since 2014. Solskjær made his senior debut for Kristiansund on 1 November 2020, coming on as second-half substitute for Liridon Kalludra in a 3–2 defeat to top of the table Bodø/Glimt.

He moved on loan to Sogndal in April 2021. He was released after the 2021 season, signing for Spjelkavik in the summer of 2022.

In February 2024, Solskjær signed a two-year contract with Aalesund. On 28 February 2025, he was loaned to Brattvåg until 15 July 2025.

== Playing style ==
He has said he models his game on Michael Carrick. He has previously said his favourite player is Wayne Rooney.

== Personal life ==
Solskjær is the son of former professional footballer Ole Gunnar Solskjær, and he is the eldest of three children.

== Career statistics ==
As of 29 December 2024

Club	Season	League			National cup		Other		Total	
Club	Season	Division	Apps	Goals	Apps	Goals	Apps	Goals	Apps	Goals
Kristiansund 2	2017	4. divisjon	1	1	0	0	0	0	1	1
Kristiansund 2	2018	3. divisjon	2	0	0	0	0	0	2	0
Kristiansund 2	2019	4. divisjon	19	2	0	0	2 (Note: Appearances in the play-offs)	0	21	2
Kristiansund 2	Total		22	3	0	0	2	0	24	3
Kristiansund	2020	Eliteserien	3	0	0	0	0	0	3	0
Kristiansund	2021	Eliteserien	0	0	0	0	0	0	0	0
Kristiansund	Total		3	0	0	0	0	0	3	0
Sogndal (loan)	2021	1. divisjon	6	0	3	0	0	0	9	0
Sogndal 2 (loan)	2021	3. divisjon	10	0	0	0	0	0	10	0
Spjelkavik	2022	3. divisjon	11	6	0	0	0	0	11	6
Spjelkavik	2023	3. divisjon	26	16	1	0	0	0	27	16
Spjelkavik	Total		37	22	1	0	0	0	38	22
Spjelkavik 2	2022	5. divisjon	1	0	0	0	0	0	1	0
Aalesund	2024	1. divisjon	8	0	0	0	0	0	8	0
Aalesund 2	2024	3. divisjon	5	0	0	0	0	0	5	0
Career total			92	25	4	0	2	0	98	25
