= Max Normann Williamsen =

Norwegian footballer (born 2003)

Personal information
- Date of birth: 24 July 2003 (age 23)
- Height: 1.88 m (6 ft 2 in)
- Position: Centre-back

Team information
- Current team: Kristiansund
- Number: 17

Youth career
- –2017: Clausenengen
- 2018–2022: Kristiansund

Senior career*
Years	Team	Apps	(Gls)
2019–	Kristiansund 2	11	(0)
2020–	Kristiansund	78	(2)
2021	→ Levanger (loan)	12	(0)

International career^{‡}
2019	Norway U16	1	(0)
2020	Norway U17	4	(0)
2021	Norway U18	9	(0)
2022–2023	Norway U20	3	(1)
2023	Norway U21	2	(0)
- * Club domestic league appearances and goals as of 23 July 2026 ‡ National team caps and goals as of 26 September 2025

Max Normann Williamsen (born 24 July 2003) is a Norwegian professional footballer who currently plays for Kristiansund BK.

He played youth football for Clausenengen FK before joining Clausenengen's elite team Kristiansund BK. In September 2018 he signed with Kristiansund's first team on a 1.5-year deal. He made his Eliteserien debut in September 2020 against Viking.

== Career statistics ==
=== Club ===
As of 26 September 2025

Appearances and goals by club, season and competition
Club	Season	League			National Cup		Other		Total	
Club	Season	Division	Apps	Goals	Apps	Goals	Apps	Goals	Apps	Goals
Kristiansund 2	2019	4. divisjon	4	0	—		—		4	0
Kristiansund 2	2021	4. divisjon	2	0	—		—		2	0
Kristiansund 2	2022	4. divisjon	1	0	—		—		1	0
Kristiansund 2	2023	3. divisjon	2	0	—		—		2	0
Kristiansund 2	2025	3. divisjon	2	0	—		—		2	0
Kristiansund 2	Total		11	0	—		—		11	0
Kristiansund	2020	Eliteserien	2	0	—		—		2	0
Kristiansund	2021	Eliteserien	10	0	1	0	—		11	0
Kristiansund	2022	Eliteserien	25	2	2	0	—		27	2
Kristiansund	2023	1. divisjon	25	0	3	1	4 (Note: Appearances in Eliteserien play-offs)	0	32	1
Kristiansund	2024	Eliteserien	4	0	2	1	—		6	1
Kristiansund	2025	Eliteserien	6	0	2	0	—		8	0
Kristiansund	Total		72	2	10	2	4	0	86	4
Levanger (loan)	2021	2. divisjon	12	0	2	0	—		12	0
Career total			95	2	12	2	4	0	111	4
