= Faris Moumbagna =

Cameroonian footballer

Personal information
- Full name: Faris Pemi Moumbagna
- Date of birth: 1 July 2000 (age 26)
- Place of birth: Yaoundé, Cameroon
- Height: 1.85 m (6 ft 1 in)
- Position: Forward

Team information
- Current team: Marseille

Youth career
- –2017: Rainbow FC
- 2017–2018: Montverde Academy

Senior career*
Years	Team	Apps	(Gls)
2018–2019	Bethlehem Steel	40	(14)
2020–2023	Kristiansund	49	(9)
2021–2022	→ SønderjyskE (loan)	10	(0)
2023–2024	Bodø/Glimt	28	(15)
2024–	Marseille	19	(3)
2025–2026	→ Cremonese (loan)	5	(0)

International career^{‡}
- Cameroon U17
2018	Cameroon U20	3	(0)
2023–	Cameroon	8	(0)
- * Club domestic league appearances and goals as of 11 October 2026 ‡ National team caps and goals as of 8 June 2024

Faris Pemi Moumbagna (born 1 July 2000) is a Cameroonian professional footballer who plays as a forward for Ligue 1 club Marseille and the Cameroon national team.

== Club career ==
=== Bethlehem Steel ===
Moumbagna spent time with the Florida-based Montverde Academy before signing with United Soccer League side Bethlehem Steel. He joined the club permanently on 16 July 2018. Moumbagna would establish himself as a goalscoring threat for Steel FC during the 2019 season, scoring 11 goals; breaking the team single-season record (10) previously held by Seku Conneh.

After the 2019 season, it was announced that Moumbagna was out of contract and would become a free agent. He made 38 appearances and scored 14 goals for Steel FC.

=== Kristiansund ===
In May 2020, Moumbagna signed a three-year contract Kristiansund BK competing in Eliteserien, the highest division of Norwegian football. He made his competitive debut on 21 June, coming on as a late substitute for Sondre Sørli in a 7–2 league victory against Aalesunds FK. His first goal, coincidentally, also came against Aalesund. In a 2–1 away win in the league, Moumbagna headed home a cross from Liridon Kalludra to secure the equaliser, before Kalludra himself scored the winner. Faris Moumbagna made a total of 24 appearances for Kristiansund BK in the 2020 season; all in the league, as he scored four goals.

=== SønderjyskE ===
On 26 August 2021, he joined SønderjyskE on loan. Making his full debut for the club in the third round of the Danish Cup on 23 September, Moumbagna scored his first goal in a 4–3 away win over B 1913. His league debut followed four days later, coming off the bench to replace Emil Kornvig in the 82nd minute of a 1–0 loss to AGF.

=== Bodø/Glimt ===
On 12 January 2023, Moumbagna joined Bodø/Glimt on a four-year contract.

=== Marseille ===
On 20 January 2024, Moumbagna signed a four-and-a-half-year contract with Ligue 1 club Marseille, for a reported transfer fee of €8 million.

== International career ==
On 17 November 2023 Moumbagna made his debut with Cameroon in a match against Mauritius for the 2026 FIFA World Cup qualifiers, playing 70 minutes.

On 28 December 2023, he was selected in the list of twenty-seven Cameroonian players selected by Rigobert Song to compete in the 2023 Africa Cup of Nations.

== Personal life ==
In the early morning of 20 May 2024, Moumbagna and OM teammate Jean Onana were the victims of an armed robbery attempt while they were in their cars as they were leaving La Commanderie. Although neither were injured, two bullet holes were found on the driver's door on one of the vehicles. Moumbagna is Muslim

== Career statistics ==
=== Club ===
As of 15 October 2026

Appearances and goals by club, season and competition
Club	Season	League			Cup		Continental		Total	
Club	Season	Division	Apps	Goals	Apps	Goals	Apps	Goals	Apps	Goals
Bethlehem Steel	2018	USL Championship	15	3	0	0	—		15	3
Bethlehem Steel	2019	USL Championship	25	11	0	0	—		25	11
Bethlehem Steel	Total		40	14	0	0	—		40	14
Kristiansund	2020	Eliteserien	24	4	0	0	—		24	4
Kristiansund	2021	Eliteserien	11	0	0	0	—		11	0
Kristiansund	2022	Eliteserien	14	5	0	0	—		14	5
Kristiansund	Total		49	9	0	0	—		49	9
Sønderjyske (loan)	2021–22	Danish Superliga	10	0	4	1	—		14	1
Bodø/Glimt	2023	Eliteserien	28	15	8	3	14 (Note: Appearances in the UEFA Europa Conference League)	6	50	24
Marseille	2023–24	Ligue 1	13	3	0	0	7 (Note: Appearances in UEFA Europa League)	1	20	4
Marseille	2024–25	Ligue 1	1	0	0	0	0	0	1	0
Marseille	2026–27	Ligue 1	4	0	0	0	1	0	5	0
Marseille	Total		18	3	0	0	8	1	26	4
Cremonese (loan)	2025–26	Serie A	5	0	0	0	—		5	0
Career total			150	41	12	4	22	7	184	52

=== International ===
As of match played 8 June 2024

Appearances and goals by national team and year
National team	Year	Apps	Goals
Cameroon	2023	2	0
Cameroon	2024	6	0
Total		8	0

== Honours ==
Bodø/Glimt

- Eliteserien: 2023
- Norwegian Cup runner-up: 2023
