= Mikkel Frankoch =

Danish footballer (born 1996)

Personal information
- Full name: Mikkel Michael Frankoch
- Date of birth: 14 January 1996 (age 30)
- Place of birth: Denmark
- Height: 1.80 m (5 ft 11 in)
- Position: Midfielder

Youth career
- 2001–2009: Greve
- 2009–2011: Brøndby
- 2011–2015: Midtjylland

Senior career*
| Years | Team | Apps | (Gls) |
| 2015–2017 | Skive | 45 | (1) |
| 2017–2019 | Vendsyssel | 43 | (0) |
| 2020 | HB Tórshavn | 17 | (0) |
| 2021 | Raufoss | 9 | (0) |
| 2021–2022 | Skive | 26 | (1) |

International career
| 2011–2012 | Denmark U16 | 6 | (0) |
| 2012 | Denmark U17 | 8 | (0) |
- * Club domestic league appearances and goals as of 16 November 2020

Mikkel Michael Frankoch (born 14 January 1996) is a Danish footballer.

== Career ==
=== Early career ===
Frankoch started playing football in Greve IF at the age of 5 with his dad as his coach. As U14 player, Frankoch got a few invites from other clubs, but chose Brøndby IF because it was his supporter team. In Brøndby, Frankoch was retrained from being a defender to a midfielder. A year after his arrival, he went on three trial camps at FC Midtjylland and the club ended up offering him a youth contract. He decided to wait and joined the club a year later. He stayed at Midtjylland for the rest of his youth years.

=== Senior career ===
In the summer 2015, Frankoch signed with his first senior club, Skive IK in the Danish 1st Division. He played for the club two years, before joining fellow club Vendsyssel FF.

On 1 February 2020 it was confirmed, that Frankoch's former manager in both Skive IK and Vendsyssel FF, Jens Berthel Askou, had brought him to HB Tórshavn where he had been appointed manager in December 2019. He left the club at the end of 2020.

After a spell at Norwegian club Raufoss IL in 2021, Frankoch returned to Skive IK on 31 August 2021.
