= Serigne Mbaye (footballer) =

Senegalese footballer

Personal information
- Full name: Serigne Mor Mbaye
- Date of birth: January 3, 1996 (age 30)
- Place of birth: Bargny, Senegal
- Height: 1.90 m (6 ft 3 in)
- Position: Goalkeeper

Youth career
- –2014: Aspire Senegal

Senior career*
Years	Team	Apps	(Gls)
2014–2016	KAS Eupen	0	(0)
2015	→ Kristiansund (loan)	0	(0)
2016	Fylkir	0	(0)
2016	Kristiansund	0	(0)
2018	Víkingur	0	(0)
2019–2025	Kristiansund	40	(0)
2020	→ HamKam (loan)	11	(0)
2021	→ Sogndal (loan)	9	(0)
2024	→ Sandnes Ulf (loan)	16	(0)
- * Club domestic league appearances and goals as of 14 November 2024

Serigne Mor Mbaye (born 3 January 1996) is a Senegalese footballer who plays as a goalkeeper who is a free agent.

== Career ==
=== Club ===
On 15 February 2019, Mbaye returned to Kristiansund on a one-year contract, signing a new three-year contract with Kristiansund on 14 February 2020. Following Sean McDermott's injury at the onset of the 2020 season, Mbaye became first-choice goalkeeper.

== Career statistics ==
As of match played 10 December 2023

Appearances and goals by club, season and competition
Club	Season	League			National Cup		League Cup		Continental		Total	
Club	Season	Division	Apps	Goals	Apps	Goals	Apps	Goals	Apps	Goals	Apps	Goals
KAS Eupen	2014–15	Belgian Second Division	0	0	0	0	-		-		0	0
KAS Eupen	2015–16	Belgian Second Division	0	0	0	0	-		-		0	0
KAS Eupen	Total		0	0	0	0	-	-	-	-	0	0
Kristiansund (loan)	2015	1. divisjon	0	0	0	0	-		-		0	0
Fylkir	2016	Úrvalsdeild	0	0	0	0	0	0	-		0	0
Kristiansund	2016	1. divisjon	0	0	0	0	-		-		0	0
Víkingur	2018	Úrvalsdeild	0	0	1	0	0	0	-		1	0
Kristiansund	2019	Eliteserien	2	0	4	0	-		-		6	0
Kristiansund	2020	Eliteserien	12	0	0	0	-		-		12	0
Kristiansund	2022	Eliteserien	7	0	1	0	-		-		8	0
Kristiansund	2023	1. divisjon	19	0	3	0	-		4	0	26	0
Kristiansund	2024	Eliteserien	0	0	3	0	-		-		3	0
Kristiansund	Total		40	0	11	0	-	-	4	0	55	0
HamKam (loan)	2020	1. divisjon	11	0	0	0	-		-		11	0
Sogndal (loan)	2021	1. divisjon	9	0	0	0	-		-		9	0
Sogndal (loan)	Total		20	0	0	0	-	-	-	-	20	0
Career total			60	0	11	0	-	-	4	0	75	0
