= Kristiansund Stadion =

Football stadium in Kristiansund, Norway

Nordmøre Stadion
- "Gressbanen", "KFK-banen"
- Interactive map of Nordmøre Stadion
- Former names: Gressbanen
- Location: Magnar Isaksens vei 1; 6514 Kristiansund; Norway
- Coordinates: 63°07′29″N 7°43′05″E
- Owner: Kristiansund Municipality
- Operator: Kristiansund Ballklubb
- Capacity: 4,444
- Surface: Artificial
- Record attendance: 6,200 (Kristiansund FK vs Ørn-Horten, 17 September 1950)
- Field size: 105 by 60 metres (114.8 yd × 65.6 yd)

Construction
- Groundbreaking: 1946
- Built: 1946–1950
- Opened: 17 September 1950

Tenants
- Kristiansund FK (1950–present); Kristiansund Ballklubb (2014–present)

Nordmøre stadion, until 2014 known as Gressbanen is a football stadium located at Karihola in the town of Kristiansund which is located in Kristiansund Municipality, Møre og Romsdal county, Norway, and is the home of both Norwegian Eliteserien club Kristiansund Ballklubb and 4. divisjon (fifth tier) club Kristiansund Fotballklubb. The stadium has a current capacity of 4,444 spectators.

== History ==
Nordmøre Stadion was opened 17 September 1950, in a match between Kristiansund FK and Ørn-Horten. Kristiansund FK lost the game 2–3. The attendance on the opening game, 6,200, is still the record attendance at Nordmøre Stadion. Since the stadium has been home to Kristiansund Fotballklubb, the stadium was called "KFK-banen" ("The KFK pitch).

== Attendances ==
This shows the average attendance on Kristiansund BK's home games since 2014, their first season at the renovated Kristiansund Stadion.

	Eliteserien
†	1. divisjon

Attendance
Season	Avg	Min	Max	Rank	Ref
2014	1,450	1,228	1,900	6†	
2015	1,672	1,256	3,080	6†	
2016	2,028	1,271	3,026	3†	
2017	3,824	3,392	4,126	14	
2018	4,042	3,753	4,277	11	
2019	4,092	3,820	4,444	11	
