= Aliou Coly =

Senegalese footballer (born 1992)

Personal information
- Full name: Aliou Coly
- Date of birth: 10 December 1992 (age 33)
- Place of birth: Senegal
- Height: 1.86 m (6 ft 1 in)
- Position: Defender

Team information
- Current team: Jerv
- Number: 29

Youth career
- Casa Sports

Senior career*
Years	Team	Apps	(Gls)
2009–2013	Casa Sports	26	(7)
2013–2014	Molde	8	(0)
2014	→ Kristiansund (loan)	27	(1)
2015–2023	Kristiansund	205	(8)
2023–	Jerv	8	(0)

International career^{‡}
2012	Senegal U-23	1	(0)
Medal record
Molde
Winner	Norwegian Football Cup	2013
Kristiansund
Winner	OBOS-ligaen	2016
- * Club domestic league appearances and goals as of 6 December 2023 ‡ National team caps and goals as of 6 June 2013

Aliou Coly (born 10 December 1992) is a Senegalese footballer playing as a defender for Jerv in the OBOS-ligaen.

== Career ==
=== Club ===
==== Early career ====
Aliou Coly started playing football for Casa Sports in Senegal.

In 2012, Coly went on trial with Tippeligaen side Sogndal, where his age was quoted as being 23.

==== Molde FK ====
Coly signed for Tippeligaen side Molde in February 2013 at the beginning of the 2013-season.

Coly's first appearance for Molde was in the Norwegian Cup first round match against Elnesvågen in which he scored 4 of the 5 goals in a 5–0 victory. This included a 10-minute hattrick.

In February 2014 Coly joined Kristiansund on loan till 31 July 2014.

==== Kristiansund ====
On 21 January 2015, Coly moved to Kristiansund on a permanent deal, signing a two-year contract.

=== FK Jerv ===
On 11 September 2023, Coly signed with FK Jerv for the rest of 2023-season.

=== International ===
Coly made his debut for the Senegalese U-23 team on 17 March 2012.

== Career statistics ==
=== Club ===
As of 20 May 2021

Club	Season	Division	League		Cup		Europe		Total	
Club	Season	Division	Apps	Goals	Apps	Goals	Apps	Goals	Apps	Goals
Molde	2013	Tippeligaen	8	0	2	4	3	1	13	5
Kristiansund (loan)	2014	1. divisjon	27	1	2	0	-		29	1
Kristiansund	2015	1. divisjon	29	2	2	1	-		31	3
Kristiansund	2016	1. divisjon	26	1	1	0	-		27	1
Kristiansund	2017	Eliteserien	24	0	0	0	-		24	0
Kristiansund	2018	Eliteserien	23	2	1	1	-		24	3
Kristiansund	2019	Eliteserien	23	0	1	0	-		24	0
Kristiansund	2020	Eliteserien	23	1	0	0	-		23	1
Kristiansund	2021	Eliteserien	2	0	0	0	-		2	0
Career Total			184	7	9	6	3	1	195	14

== Honours ==
Casa Sports

- Senegal Premier League: 2011–12

Molde

- Norwegian Cup: 2013

Kristiansund

- 1. divisjon: 2016
