= Andreas Hopmark =

Norwegian footballer (born 1991)

Personal information
- Full name: Andreas Eines Hopmark
- Date of birth: 6 July 1991 (age 35)
- Place of birth: Kristiansund, Norway
- Position: Defender

Senior career*
Years	Team	Apps	(Gls)
2012–2024	Kristiansund	251	(7)
- * Club domestic league appearances and goals as of 4 December 2024

Andreas Eines Hopmark (born 6 July 1991) is a retired Norwegian footballer who played all his professional career for Kristiansund.

== Career statistics ==
As of 21 August 2021

Season	Club	Division	League		Cup		Total	
Season	Club	Division	Apps	Goals	Apps	Goals	Apps	Goals
2012	Kristiansund	2. divisjon	25	3	2	0	27	3
2013	Kristiansund	1. divisjon	7	0	2	0	9	0
2014	Kristiansund	1. divisjon	13	1	2	0	15	1
2015	Kristiansund	1. divisjon	21	0	1	0	22	0
2016	Kristiansund	1. divisjon	27	0	1	0	28	0
2017	Kristiansund	Eliteserien	27	0	4	1	31	1
2018	Kristiansund	Eliteserien	20	1	1	0	21	1
2019	Kristiansund	Eliteserien	17	0	0	0	17	0
2020	Kristiansund	Eliteserien	30	1	–		30	1
2021	Kristiansund	Eliteserien	15	1	2	0	17	1
Career Total			202	7	15	1	217	8
