= Erlend Sivertsen =

Norwegian footballer (born 1991)

Personal information
- Full name: Erlend Ernst Blakstad Sivertsen
- Date of birth: 28 January 1991 (age 35)
- Place of birth: Kristiansund, Norway
- Height: 1.79 m (5 ft 10 in)
- Position: Defender

Senior career*
Years	Team	Apps	(Gls)
2011–2021	Kristiansund	151	(7)
2020	→ Tromsø (loan)	12	(0)
2022	Östersund	10	(0)
2023	Lyn	14	(0)
- * Club domestic league appearances and goals as of 19 February 2024

Erlend Ernst Blakstad Sivertsen (born 28 January 1991) is a Norwegian professional footballer who plays as a defender.

== Career ==
He made his debut for Kristiansund BK in 2011.

He signed for Östersund in January 2022.

== Career statistics ==
As of match played 12 December 2021

Statistics for 2011 are missing.

Appearances and goals by club, season and competition
Club	Season	League			National Cup		Playoff		Total	
Club	Season	Division	Apps	Goals	Apps	Goals	Apps	Goals	Apps	Goals
Kristiansund	2012	2. divisjon	26	2	2	0	-		28	2
Kristiansund	2013	1. divisjon	27	3	1	0	-		27	3
Kristiansund	2014	1. divisjon	23	1	1	0	1	0	24	1
Kristiansund	2015	1. divisjon	29	1	2	0	2	0	31	1
Kristiansund	2016	1. divisjon	1	0	0	0	-		1	0
Kristiansund	2017	Eliteserien	2	0	0	0	-		2	0
Kristiansund	2018	Eliteserien	9	0	3	0	-		12	0
Kristiansund	2019	Eliteserien	8	0	4	0	-		12	0
Kristiansund	2020	Eliteserien	11	0	-		-		11	0
Kristiansund	2021	Eliteserien	15	0	2	0	-		17	0
Kristiansund	Total		151	7	15	0	3	0	169	7
Tromsø (loan)	2020	1. divisjon	12	0	0	0	-		12	0
Östersund	2022	Superettan	10	0	1	0	0	0	11	0
Lyn	2023	2. divisjon	14	0	0	0	0	0	14	0
Career total			187	7	16	0	3	0	206	7
