= Jesper Isaksen =

Norwegian footballer (born 1999)

Personal information
- Date of birth: 13 October 1999 (age 27)
- Position: Midfielder

Team information
- Current team: Kristiansund
- Number: 6

Youth career
- –2014: Kristiansund FK
- 2015–2017: Kristiansund

Senior career*
Years	Team	Apps	(Gls)
2017–2019	Kristiansund	17	(1)
2020–2021	Stabæk	9	(0)
2020	→ Jerv (loan)	13	(0)
2021	→ Fredrikstad (loan)	8	(0)
2021–2024	Kristiansund	89	(5)
2025	Stabæk	21	(8)
2026–	Kristiansund	9	(0)
- * Club domestic league appearances and goals as of 23 July 2026

Jesper Isaksen (born 13 October 1999) is a Norwegian professional footballer who plays for Kristiansund.

== Career statistics ==
As of match played 5 October 2024

Appearances and goals by club, season and competition
Club	Season	League			National Cup		Other		Total	
Club	Season	Division	Apps	Goals	Apps	Goals	Apps	Goals	Apps	Goals
Kristiansund	2017	Eliteserien	2	0	1	0	0	0	3	0
Kristiansund	2018	Eliteserien	1	0	2	0	0	0	3	0
Kristiansund	2019	Eliteserien	14	1	2	0	0	0	16	1
Kristiansund	Total		17	1	5	0	0	0	22	1
Stabæk	2020	Eliteserien	9	0	–		0	0	9	0
Stabæk	2021	Eliteserien	0	0	0	0	0	0	0	0
Stabæk	Total		9	0	0	0	0	0	9	0
Jerv (loan)	2020	1. divisjon	13	0	–		0	0	13	0
Fredrikstad (loan)	2021	1. divisjon	8	0	1	0	0	0	9	0
Kristiansund	2021	Eliteserien	17	1	2	1	0	0	19	2
Kristiansund	2022	Eliteserien	20	0	2	0	0	0	22	0
Kristiansund	2023	1. divisjon	21	0	2	1	4	0 (Note: NFF erroneously counts a hit during a penalty shootout as a goal.)	27	1
Kristiansund	2024	Eliteserien	24	3	3	0	0	0	27	3
Kristiansund	Total		82	4	9	2	4	0	95	6
Career total			129	5	15	2	4	0	148	7
