= Ousseynou Diagné =

Senegalese footballer

Personal information
- Full name: Ousseynou Cavin Diagné
- Date of birth: 5 June 1999 (age 27)
- Place of birth: Dakar, Senegal
- Height: 1.90 m (6 ft 3 in)
- Position: Midfielder

Youth career
- 2015–2018: Cádiz CF

Senior career*
| Years | Team | Apps | (Gls) |
| 2018–2019 | Le Mans | 3 | (0) |
| 2019–2020 | Club Brugge II | | |
| 2020–2021 | Kristiansund | 8 | (0) |
| 2022– | ES Zarzis | 2 | (0) |

International career^{‡}
| 2017–2019 | Senegal U20 | | |
- * Club domestic league appearances and goals as of 15 April 2022 ‡ National team caps and goals as of 23 May 2021

Ousseynou Cavin Diagné (born 5 June 1999) is a Senegalese football midfielder who plays for ES Zarzis.

He played youth football for Cádiz CF and had modest spells in Le Mans and Club Brugge II before moving to his fourth European country, signing for Kristiansund BK in February 2020. He made his Eliteserien debut in July 2020 against Bodø/Glimt. In 2021, he trialled with Raufoss IL, but stayed with Kristiansund. He was however released in late May 2021.

Internationally, he was a squad member for the 2017 Africa U-20 Cup of Nations, the 2019 Africa U-20 Cup of Nations and the 2019 FIFA U-20 World Cup.
