= Sean McDermott (footballer) =

Irish footballer (born 1993)

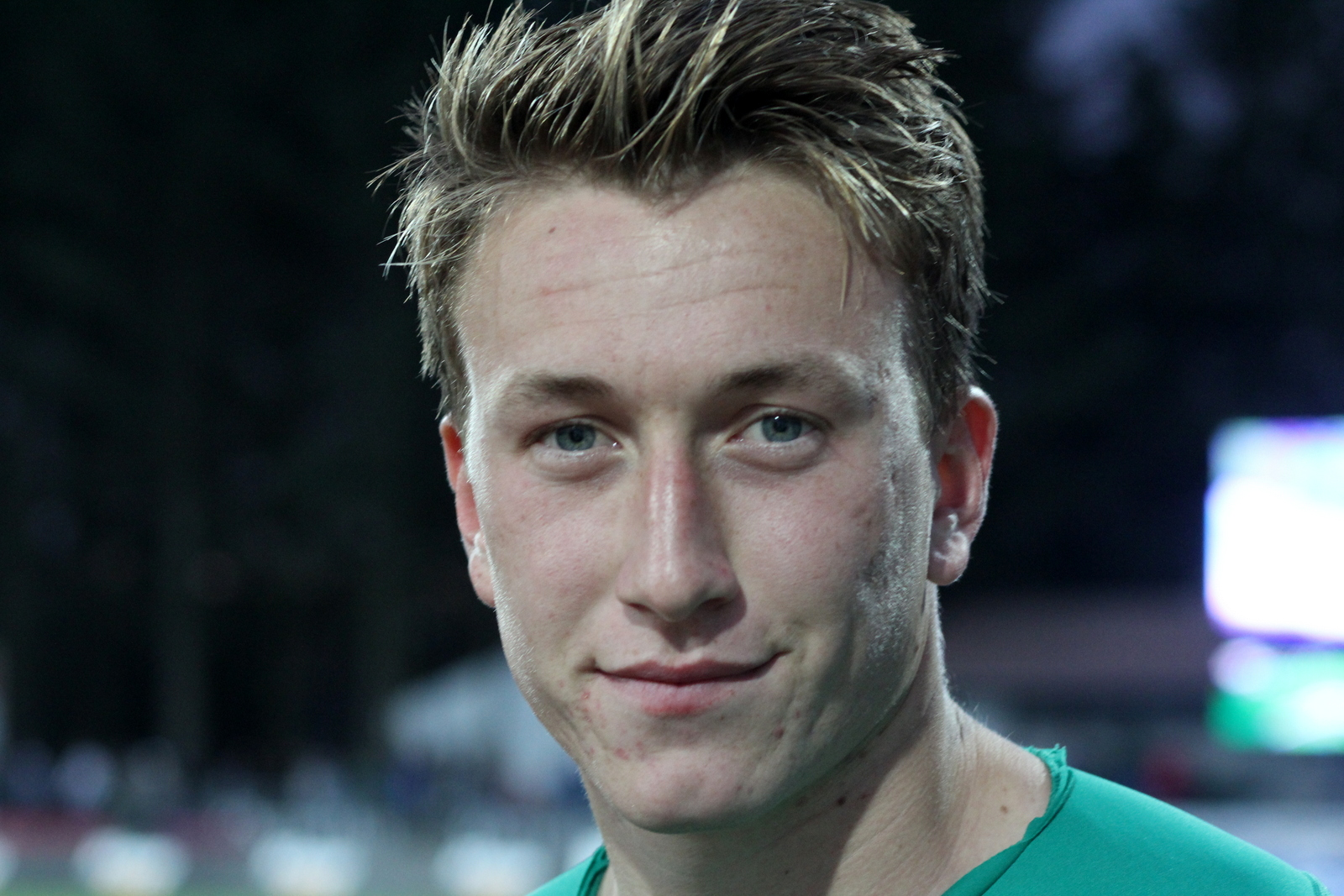

Personal information
- Full name: Sean McDermott
- Date of birth: 30 May 1993 (age 33)
- Place of birth: Kristiansand, Norway
- Position: Goalkeeper

Youth career
- Våg
- 2009–2012: Arsenal

Senior career*
Years	Team	Apps	(Gls)
2012	→ Leeds United (loan)	0	(0)
2012–2015	Sandnes Ulf	31	(0)
2015–2016	Start	0	(0)
2016	Ull/Kisa	11	(0)
2017–2018	Kristiansund	57	(0)
2019	Dinamo București	3	(0)
2019–2023	Kristiansund	104	(0)
2024–2025	Molde	4	(0)

International career^{‡}
2010	Republic of Ireland U17	1	(0)
2011–2012	Republic of Ireland U19	2	(0)
2013–2014	Republic of Ireland U21	6	(0)
- * Club domestic league appearances and goals as of 19 October 2025 ‡ National team caps and goals as of 28 February 2019

Sean McDermott (born 30 May 1993) is a former professisonal footballer playing as a goalkeeper. Born in Norway, he represented the Republic of Ireland at youth level. He has previously played for Start and Dinamo București, among others.

== Personal life ==
McDermott was born to a Norwegian mother and a Donegal-born father in Kristiansand where he also grew up. He lived in Donegal for six months when he was 9 and played in goal for his local Gaelic football club.

== Career ==
=== Arsenal ===
McDermott joined Arsenal's youth team in July 2009 after a successful ten-day trial with the club as a 15-year-old in May 2008. McDermott signed for Arsenal from Kristiansand minnows IK Våg in November 2008, but didn't officially complete his move to the club until after he turned 16 at the end of May 2009.

McDermott has declared his international allegiance to the Republic of Ireland. He signed his first professional contract with the club in June 2010.

McDermott joined Leeds United on a one-month loan.

McDermott was released by Arsenal in the summer of 2012, before he signed with Norwegian club Sandnes Ulf on 15 August 2012. He made his debut in Tippeligaen in the match against Rosenborg on 19 October 2012, instead of the first-choice goalkeeper Aslak Falch. When Sandnes Ulf faced Rosenborg again, in the following season, McDermott was accused of fouling the Rosenborg-player Nicki Bille Nielsen in the penalty box, but the referee awarded a free-kick to McDermott. Bille Nielsen's taking off his shirt in frustration earned him a second yellow card in the game. The match ended with a 1–0 victory for Sandnes Ulf. Sandnes Ulf were relegated in 2014, but in the summer transfer window of 2015, McDermott returned to the first tier as he joined IK Start.

=== Kristiansund ===
Prior to the 2017-season he joined newly promoted Kristiansund.

=== Molde ===
On 30 May 2024, McDermott signed for Molde on a contract until the end of the Eliteserien season. On 1 October 2024, Molde announced that McDermott had extended his contract with the club until the end of the 2026 season.

On 26 November 2025, McDermott announced that he would retire from the game at the end of the 2025 season.

== Career statistics ==
=== Club ===
As of match played 19 October 2025

Appearances and goals by club, season and competition
Club	Season	League			National Cup		Continental		Other		Total	
Club	Season	Division	Apps	Goals	Apps	Goals	Apps	Goals	Apps	Goals	Apps	Goals
Sandnes Ulf	2012	Tippeligaen	6	0	0	0	-		-		6	0
Sandnes Ulf	2013	Tippeligaen	25	0	0	0	-		-		25	0
Sandnes Ulf	2014	Tippeligaen	0	0	0	0	-		-		0	0
Sandnes Ulf	2015	OBOS-ligaen	0	0	0	0	-		-		0	0
Sandnes Ulf	Total		31	0	0	0	-	-	-	-	31	0
Start	2015	Tippeligaen	0	0	0	0	-		-		0	0
Start	2016	Tippeligaen	0	0	2	0	-		-		2	0
Start	Total		0	0	2	0	-	-	-	-	2	0
Ullensaker/Kisa	2016	OBOS-ligaen	11	0	0	0	-		-		11	0
Ullensaker/Kisa	Total		11	0	0	0	-	-	-	-	11	0
Kristiansund	2017	Eliteserien	28	0	2	0	-		-		30	0
Kristiansund	2018	Eliteserien	29	0	3	0	-		-		32	2
Kristiansund	Total		57	0	5	0	-	-	-	-	62	0
Dinamo București	2018–19	Liga I	3	0	0	0	-		-		3	0
Dinamo București	Total		3	0	0	0	-	-	-	-	3	0
Kristiansund	2019	Eliteserien	28	0	0	0	-		-		28	0
Kristiansund	2020	Eliteserien	12	0	0	0	-		-		12	0
Kristiansund	2021	Eliteserien	30	0	2	0	-		-		32	0
Kristiansund	2022	Eliteserien	23	0	2	0	-		-		25	0
Kristiansund	2023	OBOS-ligaen	11	0	0	0	-		1 (Note: Appearances in the Eliteserien Playoffs)	0	12	0
Kristiansund	Total		104	0	4	0	-	-	1	0	109	0
Molde	2024	Eliteserien	2	0	1	0	-		-		3	0
Molde	2025	Eliteserien	2	0	1	0	-		-		3	0
Molde	Total		4	0	2	0	-	-	-	-	6	0
Career total			210	0	13	0	-	-	1	0	224	0
