= Liridon Kalludra =

Swedish footballer (born 1991)

Personal information
- Full name: Liridon Kalludra
- Date of birth: 5 November 1991 (age 35)
- Place of birth: Kosovska Mitrovica, SFR Yugoslavia
- Height: 1.70 m (5 ft 7 in)
- Position: Midfielder

Team information
- Current team: IK Oddevold
- Number: 10

Youth career
- –2004: IK Svane, Uddevalla
- 2005–2007: IFK Uddevalla
- 2008: Ljungskile

Senior career*
Years	Team	Apps	(Gls)
2008–2009	Ljungskile	17	(1)
2010–2014	Kristiansund	88	(19)
2015	Sarpsborg 08	14	(1)
2015–2022	Kristiansund	192	(17)
2023–	IK Oddevold	80	(20)

International career
2006–2008	Sweden U17	7	(0)
2009	Sweden U19	7	(0)
- * Club domestic league appearances and goals as of 13 November 2025

Liridon Kalludra (born 5 November 1991) is a Swedish professional footballer who plays as a midfielder for Swedish club IK Oddevold.

== Club career ==
=== Sarpsborg 08 ===
On 30 September 2014, Kalludra signed his first professional contract with Tippeligaen side Sarpsborg 08 and this transfer would become legally effective in January 2015. On 6 April 2015, he was named as a Sarpsborg 08 substitute for the first time in a league match against Tromsø. His debut with Sarpsborg 08 came four days later in a 1–1 home draw against Vålerenga after coming on as a substitute at 765h minute in place of Henrik Ojamaa.

=== Return to Kristiansund ===
On 6 August 2015, Kalludra returned to OBOS-ligaen side Kristiansund. Three days later, he made his debut in a 1–0 home win against Fredrikstad after being named in the starting line-up.

=== IK Oddevold ===
In January 2023, Kalludra moved to Swedish Ettan-Södra club IK Oddevold, after spending more than twelve years in Norway.

== International career ==
Born in Mitrovica and raised in Sweden. From 2006, until 2009, Kalludra has been part of Sweden at youth international level, respectively has been part of the U17 and U19 teams and he with these teams played 14 matches. In addition to Sweden, he has the right to represent his homeland, Kosovo at the international level.

== Career statistics ==
=== Club ===
As of 9 November 2020

Appearances and goals by club, season and competition
Club	Season	League			Cup		Other		Total	
Club	Season	Division	Apps	Goals	Apps	Goals	Apps	Goals	Apps	Goals
Ljungskile	2009	Superettan	17	1	1	0	—		18	1
Kristiansund	2010	2. divisjon	2	0	1	0	1 (Note: Appearance with Kristiansund II)	0	4	0
Kristiansund	2011	2. divisjon	3	0	0	0	—		3	0
Kristiansund	2012	2. divisjon	25	5	1	0	—		26	5
Kristiansund	2013	1. divisjon	28	5	2	0	—		30	5
Kristiansund	2014	1. divisjon	30	9	3	0	—		33	9
Sarpsborg 08	2015	Tippeligaen	14	1	4	1	5 (Note: Appearance with Sarpsborg 08 II)	2	23	4
Kristiansund	2015	OBOS-ligaen	11	0	0	0	—		11	0
Kristiansund	2016	OBOS-ligaen	27	0	1	0	—		28	0
Kristiansund	2017	Eliteserien	22	1	4	1	—		26	2
Kristiansund	2018	Eliteserien	26	6	2	2	—		28	8
Kristiansund	2019	Eliteserien	26	3	2	1	—		28	4
Kristiansund	2020	Eliteserien	26	4	0	0	—		26	4
Career total			257	35	21	5	6	2	284	42
