= 2019 Kristiansund BK season =

Kristiansund
2019 season
- Chairman: Vidar Solli
- Manager: Christian Michelsen
- Stadium: Kristiansund Stadion
- Tippeligaen: 6th
- Norwegian Cup: Fourth Round vs Odd
- Top goalscorer: League: Amahl Pellegrino (8); All: Amahl Pellegrino (8)
Home colours	Away colours	Third colours

The 2019 season was Kristiansund's third season in the Eliteserien, the top football division in Norway, where they finished 6th and reached the Fourth Round of the Cup.

== Squad ==
Note: Flags indicate national team as defined under FIFA eligibility rules; some limited exceptions apply. Players may hold more than one non-FIFA nationality.

No.	Pos.	Nation	Player
1	GK	IRL	Sean McDermott
3	DF	NOR	Christoffer Aasbak
4	DF	FRA	Christophe Psyché
5	DF	NOR	Dan Peter Ulvestad
6	DF	NOR	Andreas Hopmark
7	FW	NOR	Torgil Øwre Gjertsen
8	MF	NOR	Olav Øby
9	FW	NOR	Amahl Pellegrino
10	MF	KOS	Liridon Kalludra
11	FW	KOS	Flamur Kastrati
13	FW	NOR	Bendik Bye

No.	Pos.	Nation	Player
14	FW	NOR	Jesper Isaksen
15	DF	NOR	Erlend Sivertsen
16	MF	FRO	Meinhard Olsen
19	DF	SEN	Aliou Coly
21	MF	SEN	Amidou Diop
22	MF	NOR	Bent Sørmo
23	DF	NOR	Pål Erik Ulvestad
24	MF	NOR	Sondre Sørli
25	DF	NOR	Henrik Gjesdal
28	MF	NOR	Noah Solskjær
30	GK	SEN	Serigne Mbaye

== Transfers ==
=== Winter ===
In: Note: Flags indicate national team as defined under FIFA eligibility rules; some limited exceptions apply. Players may hold more than one non-FIFA nationality.

No.	Pos.	Nation	Player
1	GK	IRL	Sean McDermott (from (Romania) Dinamo București)
8	MF	SWE	Haris Cirak (from (Norway) Nest-Sotra)
16	FW	FRO	Meinhard Olsen (from (Faroe Islands) B36 Tórshavn)
17	FW	NOR	Kristoffer Hoven (from (Norway) Hønefoss)
18	DF	NOR	Christopher Lindquist (on loan from (Norway) Strømsgodset)
20	FW	CMR	Thomas Amang (on loan from (Norway) Molde)
30	GK	SEN	Serigne Mbaye (from (Iceland) Víkingur)

Out: Note: Flags indicate national team as defined under FIFA eligibility rules; some limited exceptions apply. Players may hold more than one non-FIFA nationality.

No.	Pos.	Nation	Player
1	GK	IRL	Sean McDermott (to (Romania) Dinamo București)
2	DF	NOR	Joakim Bjerkås (on loan to (Norway) Sunndal, previously on loan at (Norway) Levanger)
10	MF	NOR	Sverre Økland (to (Norway) Ull/Kisa)
16	MF	NOR	Jonas Rønningen (to (Norway) Kongsvinger)
18	MF	NOR	Stian Aasmundsen (to (Norway) Mjøndalen)
20	FW	SWE	Simon Alexandersson (on loan to (Sweden) Dalkurd)
23	GK	SWE	Conny Månsson (to (Norway) Dahle)

=== Summer ===
In: Note: Flags indicate national team as defined under FIFA eligibility rules; some limited exceptions apply. Players may hold more than one non-FIFA nationality.

No.	Pos.	Nation	Player
8	MF	NOR	Olav Øby (from (Norway) KFUM)
9	FW	NOR	Amahl Pellegrino (from (Norway) Strømsgodset)

Out: Note: Flags indicate national team as defined under FIFA eligibility rules; some limited exceptions apply. Players may hold more than one non-FIFA nationality.

No.	Pos.	Nation	Player
8	MF	SWE	Haris Cirak (to (Sweden) GAIS)
12	GK	EST	Andreas Vaikla (to (Sweden) Norrköping)
17	FW	NOR	Kristoffer Hoven (to (Norway) Sogndal)
18	DF	NOR	Christopher Lindquist (loan return to (Norway) Strømsgodset)
20	FW	CMR	Thomas Amang (loan return to (Norway) Molde)
27	MF	EST	Brent Lepistu (loan return to (Finland) FC Lahti)

== Competitions ==
=== Eliteserien ===
==== Results summary ====
Overall								Home						Away					
Pld	W	D	L	GF	GA	GD	Pts	W	D	L	GF	GA	GD	W	D	L	GF	GA	GD
30	11	8	11	41	40	+1	41	8	4	3	31	15	+16	3	4	8	10	25	−15

Last updated: 1 December 2019.
Source: see below

==== Results by round ====
Round	1	2	3	4	5	6	7	8	9	10	11	12	13	14	15	16	17	18	19	20	21	22	23	24	25	26	27	28	29	30
Ground	A	H	A	A	H	A	H	A	H	A	A	H	A	H	A	H	H	A	H	A	H	A	H	A	H	H	A	H	A	H
Result	L	W	L	L	D	W	W	W	W	D	D	L	L	W	D	D	L	L	W	W	W	D	D	L	D	W	L	W	L	L
Position	14	7	12	11	8	6	5	5	5	6	6	7	7	6	8	7	7	9	7	6	6	7	6	7	7	6	6	6	6	6

Updated to match(es) played on 1 December 2019. Source: see below
A = Away; H = Home; W = Win; D = Draw; L = Loss

==== Results ====
31 March 2019 1	Viking	2–0	Kristiansund	Stavanger
18:00 CEST (UTC+2)	Bytyqi 34'; Tripić 46'; Hove (yellow card) 62'; Vikstøl (yellow card) 82'	Report	Sørmo (yellow card) 41'	Stadium: Viking Stadion; Attendance: 10,059; Referee: Rohit Saggi

7 April 2019 2	Kristiansund	2–0	Vålerenga	Kristiansund
18:00 CEST (UTC+2)	Bye 45'; Diop (yellow card) 52'; Hoven 85'	Report	Juárez (yellow card) 31' (yellow-red card) 48'; Ejuke (yellow card) 76'	Stadium: Kristiansund Stadion; Attendance: 3,984; Referee: Dag Vidar Hafsås

10 April 2019 15	Brann	2–1	Kristiansund	Bergen
18:30 CEST (UTC+2)	Bamba 3'; Rismark 61'	Report	Sørli 76'; Cirak (yellow card) 90+3'	Stadium: Brann Stadion; Attendance: 9,103; Referee: Svein Oddvar Moen

14 April 2019 3	Odd	2–0	Kristiansund	Skien
18:00 CEST (UTC+2)	Rashani 19'; Jensen (yellow card) 28'; Børven 56'; Nordkvelle (yellow card) 90'	Report	Diop (yellow card) 11'; Hoven (yellow card) 60'	Stadium: Skagerak Arena; Attendance: 4,608; Referee: Trygve Kjensli

22 April 2019 4	Kristiansund	0–0	Ranheim	Kristiansund
18:00 CEST (UTC+2)	Psyché (yellow card) 7'; Coly (yellow card) 49'	Report	Dønnem (yellow card) 24'; Barli (yellow card) 78'; Kvande (yellow card) 80'	Stadium: Kristiansund Stadion; Attendance: 4,037; Referee: Trond Ivar Døvle

28 April 2019 5	Strømsgodset	2–3	Kristiansund	Drammen
18:00 CEST (UTC+2)	Hopmark 61' (o.g.); Pellegrino 63'	Report	Kastrati 6', 30' (pen.); Kalludra 71'	Stadium: Marienlyst Stadion; Attendance: 4,875; Referee: Espen Eskås

5 May 2019 6	Kristiansund	1–0	Tromsø	Kristiansund
18:00 CEST (UTC+2)	Aasbak (yellow card) 53'; Olsen 90+6'	Report	Wangberg (yellow card) 30'; Jenssen (yellow card) 82'; Ma.Pedersen (red card) 87'	Stadium: Kristiansund Stadion; Attendance: 3,852; Referee: Kristoffer Hagenes

12 May 2019 7	Sarpsborg 08	0–1	Kristiansund	Sarpsborg
18:00 CEST (UTC+2)	Askar (yellow card) 51'	Report	Diop (yellow card) 37'; Gjesdal 53' (yellow card) 69'; Cirak (yellow card) 87'	Stadium: Sarpsborg Stadion; Attendance: 4,903; Referee: Tore Hansen

16 May 2019 8	Kristiansund	3–2	Molde	Kristiansund
18:00 CEST (UTC+2)	Bye 34'; Psyché 41'; Ulvestad (yellow card) 49'; Kalludra 56'; Sørmo (yellow card) 65'	Report	Omoijuanfo 6' (yellow card) 65'; Sjølstad (yellow card) 18'; Bye 31' (o.g.)	Stadium: Kristiansund Stadion; Attendance: 4,444; Referee: Tommy Skjerven

19 May 2019 9	Haugesund	0–0	Kristiansund	Haugesund
18:00 CEST (UTC+2)	Desler (yellow card) 70'	Report	Isaksen (yellow card) 35'	Stadium: Haugesund Stadion; Attendance: 4,559; Referee: Rohit Saggi

16 June 2019 11	Mjøndalen	1–1	Kristiansund	Mjøndalen
18:00 CEST (UTC+2)	Gauseth 21'; Bojang (yellow card) 80'	Report	Bye (yellow card) 59'; Diop 85'; P.Ulvestad (yellow card) 90+2'	Stadium: Consto Arena; Attendance: 1,978; Referee: Trygve Kjensli

23 June 2019 12	Kristiansund	0–1	Stabæk	Kristiansund
18:00 CEST (UTC+2)	Kastrati (penalty missed) 27'; Ulvestad (yellow card) 57'; Aasbak (yellow card) 62'; Coly (yellow card) 90+2'	Report	Boli 89' (pen.); Geelmuyden (yellow card) 90+2'	Stadium: Kristiansund Stadion; Attendance: 4,118; Referee: Sigurd Kringstad

29 June 2019 13	Rosenborg	1–0	Kristiansund	Trondheim
18:00 CEST (UTC+2)	Lundemo (yellow card) 28'; Jensen 45' (pen.); Meling (yellow card) 84'; Åsen (yellow card) 90'	Report	Coly (yellow card) 44'; D.Ulvestad (yellow card) 45'; P.Ulvestad (yellow card) 61'	Stadium: Lerkendal Stadion; Attendance: 13,522; Referee: Trond Ivar Døvle

5 July 2019 14	Kristiansund	5–2	Lillestrøm	Kristiansund
19:00 CEST (UTC+2)	Kalludra 6'; Psyché 23', 90+6'; Bye 35'; Kastrati 60'; Diop (yellow card) 70'; McDermott (yellow card) 76'; Coly (yellow card) 79'; Amang (yellow card) 90+1'	Report	Melgalvis 40'; Ebiye 73'; Ødemarksbakken (yellow card) 79'; Slørdahl (yellow card) 90'; Kippe (yellow card) 90+5'	Stadium: Kristiansund Stadion; Attendance: 4,316; Referee: Kai Erik Steen

4 August 2019 16	Vålerenga	1–1	Kristiansund	Oslo
20:00 CEST (UTC+2)	Lekven (yellow card) 15'; Juárez (yellow card) 51'; Vilhjálmsson 76'	Report	Sørmo (yellow card) 6' (goal) 8'; Cirak (yellow card) 70'	Stadium: Intility Arena; Attendance: 6,248; Referee: Tore Hansen

11 August 2019 17	Kristiansund	1–1	Odd	Kristiansund
18:00 CEST (UTC+2)	Kalludra (yellow card) 22'; Psyché 59'; Gjertsen (yellow card) 75'	Report	Børven 20'; Ruud (yellow card) 44'; Njie (yellow card) 69'; Hoff (yellow card) 90+2'	Stadium: Kristiansund Stadion; Attendance: 4,016; Referee: Espen Eskås

14 August 2019 10	Kristiansund	1–2	Bodø/Glimt	Kristiansund
19:00 CEST (UTC+2)	Coly (yellow card) 16'; Bye 80'	Report	Evjen 15'; Sveen (yellow card) 26' (yellow-red card) 66'; Bjørkan (yellow card) 55'; Reitan (yellow card) 60'; J.Hauge 72'	Stadium: Kristiansund Stadion; Attendance: 4,123; Referee: Tom Harald Hagen

18 August 2019 18	Stabæk	2–0	Kristiansund	Bærum
16:00 CEST (UTC+2)	Junker 15'; Amankwah (yellow card) 36'; Hanche-Olsen (yellow card) 42'; Bohinen 80'	Report	Diop (yellow card) 75'	Stadium: Nadderud Stadion; Attendance: 3,831; Referee: Svein Oddvar Moen

25 August 2019 19	Kristiansund	4–0	Mjøndalen	Kristiansund
18:00 CEST (UTC+2)	Psyché 14'; Sørli 45'; Pellegrino 47'; Kastrati 59'	Report		Stadium: Kristiansund Stadion; Attendance: 3,820; Referee: Sigurd Kringstad

1 September 2019 20	Ranheim	1–2	Kristiansund	Trondheim
18:00 CEST (UTC+2)	Heggem (yellow card) 33'; Tønne 64' (pen.)	Report	P.Ulvestad (yellow card) 61'; Pellegrino 77'; Psyché 90+3'	Stadium: EXTRA Arena; Attendance: 1,869; Referee: Trygve Kjensli

15 September 2019 21	Kristiansund	1–0	Brann	Kristiansund
20:00 CEST (UTC+2)	Pellegrino 13'; Aasbak (yellow card) 73'	Report	Wormgoor (yellow card) 65'	Stadium: Kristiansund Stadion; Attendance: 4,007; Referee: Dag Vidar Hafsås

22 September 2019 22	Lillestrøm	1–1	Kristiansund	Lillestrøm
18:00 CEST (UTC+2)	Tamm (yellow card) 5'; Marić (yellow card) 24'; Psyché 44' (o.g.)	Report	Kastrati (penalty missed) 24' (yellow card) 49'; Pellegrino 47'	Stadium: Åråsen Stadion; Attendance: 5.117; Referee: Tore Hansen

29 September 2019 23	Kristiansund	2–2	Haugesund	Kristiansund
18:00 CEST (UTC+2)	Pellegrino 11'; P.Ulvestad (yellow card) 46'; Gjertsen 85'	Report	Ringstad (yellow card) 37'; Samuelsen 50', 63'	Stadium: Kristiansund Stadion; Attendance: 3,952; Referee: Sigurd Smehus Kringstad

6 October 2019 24	Tromsø	5–0	Kristiansund	Tromsø
18:00 CEST (UTC+2)	Azemi 4', 25'; Smith (yellow card) 17'; Nilsen 38'; Jenssen 48'; Wangberg (yellow card) 57'; Espejord 76'	Report	Diop (yellow card) 45'; Psyché (yellow card) 54'; Isaksen (red card) 57'	Stadium: Alfheim Stadion; Attendance: 2,717; Referee: Ola Hobber Nilsen

19 October 2019 25	Kristiansund	2–2	Rosenborg	Kristiansund
18:00 CEST (UTC+2)	Gjertsen 43'; Psyché 84'	Report	David 21'; Johnsen 56'; Hovland (yellow card) 88'	Stadium: Kristiansund Stadion; Attendance: 4,444; Referee: Svein Oddvar Moen

27 October 2019 26	Kristiansund	4–2	Viking	Kristiansund
18:00 CET (UTC+1)	Pellegrino 43', 59', 63' (yellow card) 63'; Sørli 90+4'	Report	Torsteinbø 49'; Vikstøl 73'	Stadium: Kristiansund Stadion; Attendance: 4,301; Referee: Tore Hansen

2 November 2019 27	Molde	2–0	Kristiansund	Molde
18:30 CET (UTC+1)	Aursnes 15'; James 59'; Gabrielsen (yellow card) 62'; Linde (yellow card) 89'	Report	Psyché (yellow card) 67'	Stadium: Aker Stadion; Attendance: 8,776; Referee: Kai Erik Steen

10 November 2019 28	Kristiansund	4–0	Sarpsborg 08	Kristiansund
18:00 CET (UTC+1)	Isaksen 13'; Letellier 30' (o.g.); Aasbak 62'; Sørli 67'	Report	Abdellaoue (yellow card) 23'; Gunnarsson (yellow card) 45+2'; Lindseth (yellow card) 90+1'	Stadium: Kristiansund Stadion; Attendance: 3,856; Referee: Rohit Saggi

24 November 2019 29	Bodø/Glimt	3–0	Kristiansund	Bodø
18:00 CET (UTC+1)	Evjen 60'; Saltnes 72'; Reitan 90+3'	Report		Stadium: Aspmyra Stadion; Attendance: 3,265; Referee: Trond Ivar Døvle

1 December 2019 30	Kristiansund	1–2	Strømsgodset	Kristiansund
18:00 CET (UTC+1)	Sørli 45+2'; Coly (yellow card) 73'	Report	Maigaard 18'; Tchamba (yellow card) 36' (goal) 55'; Salvesen (yellow card) 90+2'	Stadium: Kristiansund Stadion; Attendance: 4,106; Referee: Ola Hobber Nilsen

==== Table ====
Pos	Team	Pld	W	D	L	GF	GA	GD	Pts	Qualification or relegation
4	Odd	30	15	7	8	45	40	+5	52	
5	Viking	30	13	8	9	55	42	+13	47	Qualification for the Europa League second qualifying round (Note: Viking qualified for the Europa League second qualifying round as winners of the 2019 Norwegian Cup.)
6	Kristiansund	30	11	8	11	41	41	0	41	
7	Haugesund	30	9	13	8	44	37	+7	40	
8	Stabæk	30	10	10	10	38	36	+2	40	

Source: Football Association of Norway (in Norwegian), Soccerway
Rules for classification: 1) Points; 2) Goal difference; 3) Goals scored; 4) Head-to-head points; 5) Head-to-head goal difference; 6) Head-to-head away goals scored (only if between two teams); 7) Head-to-head goals scored; 8) Play-off (only used to decide champions or relegation).

=== Norwegian Cup ===
1 May 2019 First Round	Herd	0–1	Kristiansund	Ålesund
18:00 CEST (UTC+2)	C.Karlsbakk (yellow card) 20'; M.Ødegaard (yellow card) 65'	Report	Olsen 36'; P.Ulvestad (yellow card) 70'	Stadium: AMFI Moa Stadion; Attendance: 610; Referee: Torgeir Halsen

22 May 2019 Second Round	Brattvåg	1–2 (a.e.t.)	Kristiansund	Brattvåg
18:00 CEST (UTC+2)	Martinussen (yellow card) 5'; Solnørdal (yellow card) 35'; N.Rekdal 58' (yellow card) 65'; Matland (yellow card) 68'; K.Beaches (yellow card) 70'	Report	Gjesdal (yellow card) 47'; Kastrati 71' (pen.); Kalludra 120+1'	Stadium: Brattvåg Gras; Referee: Torgeir Halsen

19 June 2019 Third Round	Levanger	1–3	Kristiansund	Levanger
18:00 CEST (UTC+2)	I.Öjhage (yellow card) 65'; S.Sakshaug 90+2'	Report	Cirak (yellow card) 47'; Coly 52' (pen.); Bye 58' (pen.), 83'; Ordagic 42'; Sørli (yellow card) 90+1'	Stadium: Moan fritidspark Attendance: 659; Referee: Marius Hansen Grøtta

26 June 2019 Fourth Round	Kristiansund	1–2 (a.e.t.)	Odd	Kristiansund
18:00 CEST (UTC+2)	Sørli 76'; Psyché (yellow card) 120+1'	Report	Lauritsen 82'; Svendsen 107'; Rashani (yellow card) 120+1'	Stadium: Kristiansund Stadion; Attendance: 2,216; Referee: Dag Vidar Hafsås

== Squad statistics ==
As of match played 1 December 2019

=== Appearances and goals ===
No.	Pos	Nat	Player	Total		Eliteserien		Norwegian Cup	
No.	Pos	Nat	Player	Apps	Goals	Apps	Goals	Apps	Goals
1	GK	(Republic of Ireland) IRL	Sean McDermott	28	0	28	0	0	0
3	DF	(Norway) NOR	Christoffer Aasbak	27	1	26+1	1	0	0
4	DF	(France) FRA	Christophe Psyché	27	7	25+1	7	1	0
5	DF	(Norway) NOR	Dan Peter Ulvestad	27	0	24+1	0	2	0
6	DF	(Norway) NOR	Andreas Hopmark	17	0	15+2	0	0	0
7	FW	(Norway) NOR	Torgil Øwre Gjertsen	32	2	24+4	2	3+1	0
8	MF	(Norway) NOR	Olav Øby	3	0	0+3	0	0	0
9	FW	(Norway) NOR	Amahl Pellegrino	10	8	10	8	0	0
10	MF	(Norway) NOR	Liridon Kalludra	28	4	17+9	3	2	1
11	FW	(Kosovo) KOS	Flamur Kastrati	21	5	17+2	4	2	1
13	FW	(Norway) NOR	Bendik Bye	26	6	18+5	4	0+3	2
14	MF	(Norway) NOR	Jesper Isaksen	16	1	5+9	1	2	0
15	DF	(Norway) NOR	Erlend Sivertsen	12	0	4+4	0	4	0
16	MF	(Faroe Islands) FRO	Meinhard Olsen	14	2	2+9	1	2+1	1
19	DF	(Senegal) SEN	Aliou Coly	27	1	20+3	0	3+1	1
21	MF	(Senegal) SEN	Amidou Diop	29	1	26+1	1	1+1	0
22	MF	(Norway) NOR	Bent Sørmo	28	1	19+7	1	2	0
23	MF	(Norway) NOR	Pål Erik Ulvestad	24	0	13+8	0	3	0
24	MF	(Norway) NOR	Sondre Sørli	25	5	15+8	5	2	0
25	DF	(Norway) NOR	Henrik Gjesdal	10	1	5+2	1	3	0
30	GK	(Senegal) SEN	Serigne Mbaye	6	0	2	0	4	0
Players away from Kristiansund on loan:
Players who left Kristiansund during the season:
8	MF	(Sweden) SWE	Haris Cirak	13	0	6+3	0	3+1	0
17	FW	(Norway) NOR	Kristoffer Hoven	9	1	2+4	1	1+2	0
18	DF	(Norway) NOR	Christopher Lindquist	1	0	0	0	1	0
20	FW	(Cameroon) CMR	Thomas Amang	15	0	7+4	0	2+2	0
27	MF	(Estonia) EST	Brent Lepistu	1	0	0	0	1	0

=== Goal scorers ===
Place	Position	Nation	Number	Name	Eliteserien	Norwegian Cup	Total
1	FW	(Norway)	9	Amahl Pellegrino	8	0	8
2	DF	(France)	4	Christophe Psyché	7	0	7
3	MF	(Norway)	24	Sondre Sørli	5	1	6
3	FW	(Norway)	13	Bendik Bye	4	2	6
5	FW	(Kosovo)	11	Flamur Kastrati	4	1	5
6	MF	(Kosovo)	10	Liridon Kalludra	3	1	4
7	FW	(Norway)	7	Torgil Øwre Gjertsen	2	0	2
7	MF	(Faroe Islands)	16	Meinhard Olsen	1	1	2
9	DF	(Norway)	3	Christoffer Aasbak	1	0	1
9	DF	(Norway)	25	Henrik Gjesdal	1	0	1
9	MF	(Norway)	14	Jesper Isaksen	1	0	1
9	MF	(Senegal)	21	Amidou Diop	1	0	1
9	MF	(Norway)	22	Bent Sørmo	1	0	1
9	FW	(Norway)	17	Krisotffer Hoven	1	0	1
9	DF	(Senegal)	19	Aliou Coly	0	1	1
9				Own goal	1	0	1
				TOTALS	41	7	48

=== Disciplinary record ===
Number	Nation	Position	Name	Eliteserien		Norwegian Cup		Total	
Number	Nation	Position	Name	Yellow card	Red card	Yellow card	Red card	Yellow card	Red card
1	(Republic of Ireland)	GK	Sean McDermott	1	0	0	0	1	0
3	(Norway)	DF	Christoffer Aasbak	3	0	0	0	3	0
4	(France)	DF	Christophe Psyché	3	0	1	0	4	0
5	(Norway)	DF	Dan Peter Ulvestad	3	0	0	0	3	0
7	(Norway)	FW	Torgil Øwre Gjertsen	1	0	0	0	1	0
9	(Norway)	FW	Amahl Pellegrino	1	0	0	0	1	0
10	(Kosovo)	MF	Liridon Kalludra	1	0	0	0	1	0
11	(Kosovo)	FW	Flamur Kastrati	1	0	0	0	1	0
13	(Norway)	FW	Bendik Bye	4	0	0	0	1	0
14	(Norway)	MF	Jesper Isaksen	1	1	0	0	1	1
19	(Senegal)	DF	Aliou Coly	6	0	0	0	6	0
21	(Norway)	MF	Amidou Diop	6	0	0	0	6	0
22	(Norway)	MF	Bent Sørmo	3	0	0	0	3	0
23	(Norway)	MF	Pål Erik Ulvestad	4	0	1	0	5	0
24	(Norway)	MF	Sondre Sørli	0	0	1	0	1	0
25	(Norway)	DF	Henrik Gjesdal	1	0	1	0	2	0
Players who left Kristiansund during the season:
8	(Sweden)	MF	Haris Cirak	3	0	1	0	4	0
17	(Norway)	FW	Krisotffer Hoven	1	0	0	0	1	0
20	(Cameroon)	FW	Thomas Amang	1	0	0	0	1	0
			TOTALS	44	1	5	0	49	1
