= List of Kristiansund BK seasons =

This is a list of seasons played by Kristiansund Ballklubb in Norwegian football from their first season in 2004 to the most recent completed season. It details the club's achievements in major competitions, and the top scorers. The statistics is up to date as of the end of the 2025 season.

== 2004–present ==
Season	League											Cup	Europe	Top goalscorer		Ref
Season	Tier	Division (Grp.)	P	W	D	L	GF	GA	Pts	Pos.	Att.	Cup	Europe	Name	Goals	Ref
2004	4	3. divisjon (18)	22	15	4	3	81	21	49	2nd	—	DNQ				
2005	4	3. divisjon (18)	22	18	2	2	87	23	56	↑ 1st	—	DNQ				
2006	3	2. divisjon (2)	26	11	5	10	44	33	38	7th	—	1R				
2007	3	2. divisjon (2)	26	14	6	6	57	35	48	5th	—	2R		Kris Bright	11	
2008	3	2. divisjon (2)	26	14	2	10	56	32	44	4th	—	3R		Kris Bright	12	
2009	3	2. divisjon (2)	26	14	4	8	69	44	46	3rd	—	2R		Mamadou Diagne Latyr	15	
2010	3	2. divisjon (2)	26	17	4	5	60	35	55	2nd	—	2R				
2011	3	2. divisjon (2)	24	15	3	6	55	29	48	2nd	—	2R		Tor Erik Torske	15	
2012	3	2. divisjon (2)	26	22	2	2	77	18	68	↑ 1st	—	2R		Didrik Fløtre	13	
2013	2	1. divisjon	30	12	6	12	47	44	42	9th	1,534	2R		Jean Alassane Mendy	11	
2014	2	1. divisjon	30	13	10	7	53	39	49	4th	1,450	3R		Jean Alassane Mendy	16	
2015	2	1. divisjon	30	14	7	9	37	30	49	3rd	1,672	4R		Dan Peter Ulvestad	6	
2016	2	1. divisjon	30	19	5	6	47	30	62	↑ 1st	2,028	1R		Daouda Bamba	20	
2017	1	Eliteserien	30	10	10	10	44	46	40	7th	3,824	QF		Benjamin Stokke	10	
2018	1	Eliteserien	30	13	7	10	46	41	46	5th	4,042	3R		Bendik Bye	9	
2019	1	Eliteserien	30	11	8	11	41	41	41	6th	4,092	4R		Amahl Pellegrino	8	
2020	1	Eliteserien	30	12	12	6	57	45	48	5th	360	Cancelled		Amahl Pellegrino	25	
2021	1	Eliteserien	30	14	4	12	41	46	46	6th	2,228	3R		Bendik Bye	7	
2022	1	Eliteserien	30	5	8	17	37	60	23	↓ 15th	3,794	3R		Bendik Bye	9	
2023	2	1. divisjon	30	14	8	8	56	38	50	↑ 4th	3,246	3R		Benjamin Stokke	16	
2024	1	Eliteserien	30	8	10	12	32	45	34	11th	3,596	3R		Oskar Sivertsen	5	
2025	1	Eliteserien	30	9	7	14	34	59	34	13th	3,290	SF		Mustapha Isah	6	
