= 2018 Kristiansund BK season =

Kristiansund
2018 season
- Chairman: Vidar Solli
- Manager: Christian Michelsen
- Stadium: Kristiansund Stadion
- Tippeligaen: 5th
- Norwegian Cup: Third Round vs Hødd
- Top goalscorer: League: Bendik Bye (9); All: Bendik Bye (10)
Home colours	Away colours	Third colours

The 2018 season was Kristiansund's second season in the Eliteserien, the top football division in Norway, where they finished 5th and reached the Third Round of the Cup.

== Squad ==
As of 31 August 2018

Note: Flags indicate national team as defined under FIFA eligibility rules; some limited exceptions apply. Players may hold more than one non-FIFA nationality.

No.	Pos.	Nation	Player
1	GK	IRL	Sean McDermott
3	DF	NOR	Christoffer Aasbak
4	DF	FRA	Christophe Psyché
5	DF	NOR	Dan Peter Ulvestad
6	MF	EST	Brent Lepistu
7	FW	NOR	Torgil Øwre Gjertsen
8	MF	NOR	Pål Erik Ulvestad
9	MF	SWE	Liridon Kalludra
10	MF	NOR	Sverre Økland
11	FW	KOS	Flamur Kastrati
12	GK	EST	Andreas Vaikla
13	FW	NOR	Bendik Bye

No.	Pos.	Nation	Player
14	FW	NOR	Jesper Isaksen
15	DF	NOR	Erlend Sivertsen
16	FW	NOR	Jonas Rønningen
17	DF	SEN	Aliou Coly
18	MF	NOR	Stian Aasmundsen
19	DF	NOR	Andreas Hopmark
20	FW	SWE	Simon Alexandersson
21	MF	SEN	Amidou Diop
22	MF	NOR	Bent Sørmo
23	GK	SWE	Conny Månsson
24	MF	NOR	Sondre Sørli
25	DF	NOR	Henrik Gjesdal
28	MF	NOR	Noah Solskjær

=== Out on loan ===
Note: Flags indicate national team as defined under FIFA eligibility rules; some limited exceptions apply. Players may hold more than one non-FIFA nationality.

No.	Pos.	Nation	Player
2	DF	NOR	Joakim Bjerkås (at Levanger)

== Transfers ==
=== Winter ===
In: Note: Flags indicate national team as defined under FIFA eligibility rules; some limited exceptions apply. Players may hold more than one non-FIFA nationality.

No.	Pos.	Nation	Player
6	MF	EST	Brent Lepistu (from (Estonia) Flora Tallinn)
12	GK	EST	Andreas Vaikla (from (Finland) IFK Mariehamn)
13	FW	NOR	Bendik Bye (from (Norway) Sogndal)
18	MF	NOR	Stian Aasmundsen (from (Sweden) Jönköpings Södra)
22	MF	NOR	Bent Sørmo (from (Norway) Levanger)

Out: Note: Flags indicate national team as defined under FIFA eligibility rules; some limited exceptions apply. Players may hold more than one non-FIFA nationality.

No.	Pos.	Nation	Player
6	FW	NOR	Tor Erik Torske (to (Norway) Sunndal)
13	GK	CRO	Ante Knezovic (to (Serbia) Zemun)
18	FW	SEN	Jean Alassane Mendy (to (Belgium) Lokeren)
21	MF	NOR	Andreas Rødsand (released)
22	MF	NOR	Olav Øby (loan return to (Norway) Sarpsborg 08)
36	MF	NOR	Magne Hoseth (to (Norway) Averøykameratene)

=== Summer ===
In: Note: Flags indicate national team as defined under FIFA eligibility rules; some limited exceptions apply. Players may hold more than one non-FIFA nationality.

No.	Pos.	Nation	Player
4	DF	FRA	Christophe Psyché (from (Czech Republic) Baník Ostrava)
11	FW	KOS	Flamur Kastrati (from (Norway) Sandefjord)
20	FW	SWE	Simon Alexandersson (from (Sweden) Brage)

Out: Note: Flags indicate national team as defined under FIFA eligibility rules; some limited exceptions apply. Players may hold more than one non-FIFA nationality.

No.	Pos.	Nation	Player
2	DF	NOR	Joakim Bjerkås (on loan to (Norway) Levanger)
11	FW	CIV	Daouda Bamba (to (Norway) Brann)
20	FW	NOR	Benjamin Stokke (to (Denmark) Randers)
27	DF	EST	Nikita Baranov (to (Norway) Sogndal)

== Competitions ==
=== Eliteserien ===
==== Results summary ====
Overall								Home						Away					
Pld	W	D	L	GF	GA	GD	Pts	W	D	L	GF	GA	GD	W	D	L	GF	GA	GD
30	13	7	10	46	39	+7	46	8	4	3	26	16	+10	5	3	7	20	23	−3

Last updated: 24 November 2018.
Source: see below

==== Results by round ====
Round	1	2	3	4	5	6	7	8	9	10	11	12	13	14	15	16	17	18	19	20	21	22	23	24	25	26	27	28	29	30
Ground	H	A	H	A	A	H	A	H	A	H	H	A	H	A	H	A	H	A	H	A	H	A	H	A	H	A	H	A	H	A
Result	L	D	W	L	D	D	D	W	L	L	W	W	W	L	D	W	D	L	L	W	D	L	W	L	W	W	W	W	W	L
Position	12	10	6	8	11	10	13	10	10	10	10	10	9	9	9	8	8	8	9	8	9	10	9	10	8	7	7	5	5	5

Updated to match(es) played on 24 November 2018. Source: see below
A = Away; H = Home; W = Win; D = Draw; L = Loss

==== Results ====
12 March 2018 1	Kristiansund	0–1	Vålerenga	Kristiansund
19:00 CET (UTC+1)	Stokke (penalty missed) 66'; Coly (red card) 90+7'	Report	Johnson 63'; Adekugbe (yellow card) 90+7'	Stadium: Kristiansund Stadion; Attendance: 3,969; Referee: Tore Hansen

17 March 2018 2	Rosenborg	2–2	Kristiansund	Trondheim
18:00 CET (UTC+1)	Adegbenro 51'; Konradsen 53'	Report	Bamba 11'; Sørmo (yellow card) 25'; Hopmark (yellow card) 53'; Bye 80'; Rønningen (yellow card) 90+2'; McDermott (yellow card) 90+3'	Stadium: Lerkendal Stadion; Attendance: 14,285; Referee: Espen Andreas Eskås

2 April 2018 3	Kristiansund	2–1	Lillestrøm	Kristiansund
18:00 CEST (UTC+2)	Aasmundsen 51'; Gjertsen 65'	Report	Amundsen (yellow card) 17'; Knudtzon 20'; Rafn (yellow card) 70'	Stadium: Kristiansund Stadion; Attendance: 3,959; Referee: Trygve Kjensli

8 April 2018 4	Brann	1–0	Kristiansund	Bergen
18:00 CET (UTC+1)	Barmen (yellow card) 34'; Nilsen (yellow card) 36'; Acosta 90+8'; Kristiansen (yellow card) 90+9'	Report	Lepistu (yellow card) 29'; McDermott (yellow card) 90+1'	Stadium: Brann Stadion; Attendance: 8,173; Referee: Ola Hobber Nilsen

15 April 2018 5	Sandefjord	3–3	Kristiansund	Sandefjord
18:00 CEST (UTC+2)	Engblom 7'; Olsen (yellow card) 71'; Kastrati 75' (pen.) (yellow card) 79'; Coly 90+3' (o.g.)	Report	Bamba 3', 47' (yellow card) 79'; Hansen 73' (o.g.); P.Ulvestad (yellow card) 77'; Stokke (yellow card) 88'	Stadium: Komplett Arena; Attendance: 2,615; Referee: Espen Eskås

22 April 2018 6	Kristiansund	1–1	Bodø/Glimt	Kristiansund
18:00 CEST (UTC+2)	Aasmundsen 42'	Report	Hopmark 20' (o.g.)	Stadium: Kristiansund Stadion; Attendance: 4,003; Referee: Tom Harald Hagen

29 April 2018 7	Tromsø	0–0	Kristiansund	Tromsø
18:00 CEST (UTC+2)		Report	D.Ulvestad (yellow card) 90+2'	Stadium: Alfheim Stadion; Attendance: 4,131; Referee: Dag Vidar Hafsås

6 May 2018 8	Kristiansund	1–0	Stabæk	Kristiansund
18:00 CEST (UTC+2)	Coly (yellow card) 14'; Bamba 88' (pen.)	Report	Hanche-Olsen (yellow card) 40'; Moe (yellow card) 84'	Stadium: Kristiansund Stadion; Attendance: 3,914; Referee: Trond Ivar Døvle

13 May 2018 9	Haugesund	3–2	Kristiansund	Haugesund
18:00 CEST (UTC+2)	David 37'; Gytkjær 71' (yellow card) 90+1'; Kallevåg 81'	Report	Bamba 1' (yellow card) 90+1'; Aasbak (yellow card) 31'; Aasmundsen (yellow card) 58'; Bye 90+4'	Stadium: Haugesund Stadion; Attendance: 4,063; Referee: Sigurd Smehus Kringstad

16 May 2018 10	Kristiansund	1–3	Ranheim	Kristiansund
18:00 CEST (UTC+2)	Sørli (yellow card) 61'; P.Ulvestad (yellow card) 81'; Bamba 88'	Report	Tønne 22', 62' (pen.); Witry 84'	Stadium: Kristiansund Stadion; Attendance: 4,234; Referee: Rohit Saggi

21 May 2018 11	Kristiansund	4–0	Strømsgodset	Kristiansund
18:00 CEST (UTC+2)	Parr 10' (o.g.); Kalludra 23'; Tokstad 45' (o.g.); Baranov (yellow card) 63'; D.Ulvestad 82'; Lepistu (yellow card) 83'	Report	Nguen (yellow card) 83'	Stadium: Kristiansund Stadion; Attendance: 3,886; Referee: Trygve Kjensli

27 May 2018 12	Odd	1–2	Kristiansund	Skien
18:00 CEST (UTC+2)	Njie 88'	Report	Diop (yellow card) 70'; Bye 74'; Bamba 81' (yellow card) 89'	Stadium: Skagerak Arena; Attendance: 5,196; Referee: Espen Eskås

9 June 2018 13	Kristiansund	1–0	Molde	Kristiansund
18:00 CEST (UTC+2)	Baranov (yellow card) 55'; Aasmundsen 57'; Sørmo (yellow card) 76'	Report	Hussain (yellow card) 27'; Normann (yellow card) 86'	Stadium: Kristiansund Stadion; Attendance: 4,277; Referee: Tom Harald Hagen

24 June 2018 14	Start	2–0	Kristiansund	Kristiansand
18:00 CEST (UTC+2)	Kabran 61'; Lowe (yellow card) 85'; Bringaker 88'	Report	Baranov (yellow card) 74'	Stadium: Sør Arena; Attendance: 4,010; Referee: Svein Oddvar Moen

1 July 2018 15	Kristiansund	1–1	Sarpsborg 08	Kristiansund
18:00 CEST (UTC+2)	Gjertsen (yellow card) 19'; Aasmundsen 21'; Diop (yellow card) 74'; Lepistu (yellow card) 90+1'	Report	Nielsen (yellow card) 33'; Mortensen 80'	Stadium: Kristiansund Stadion; Attendance: 3,982; Referee: Kristoffer Hagenes

9 July 2018 16	Strømsgodset	2–3	Kristiansund	Drammen
19:00 CEST (UTC+2)	Nguen 6'; Júnior (yellow card) 34'; Andersen 57'; Jradi (yellow card) 71'	Report	Bye 21', 24', 31'; Sørmo (yellow card) 55'; Coly (yellow card) 71'; McDermott (yellow card) 71'	Stadium: Marienlyst Stadion; Attendance: 5,496; Referee: Ola Hobber Nilsen

5 August 2018 17	Kristiansund	1–1	Odd	Kristiansund
18:00 CEST (UTC+2)	Diop (yellow card) 31'; Aasmundsen (yellow card) 46'; Aasbak 53'	Report	Njie 19'; Ruud (yellow card) 59'	Stadium: Kristiansund Stadion; Attendance: 4,003; Referee: Trond Ivar Døvle

12 August 2018 18	Bodø/Glimt	3–0	Kristiansund	Bodø
18:00 CEST (UTC+2)	Zinckernagel 12'; Opseth 35'; Jacobsen (yellow card) 53'; Saltnes (yellow card) 71'; José Ángel (penalty missed) 90+4'; Herrem 90+5'	Report	Aasbak (yellow card) 58'; Aasmundsen (yellow card) 80'	Stadium: Aspmyra Stadion; Attendance: 2,804; Referee: Sigurd Kringstad

19 August 2018 19	Kristiansund	0–2	Rosenborg	Kristiansund
18:00 CEST (UTC+2)	Kastrati (yellow card) 50'; Sørmo (yellow card) 90+1'	Report	Hovland (yellow card) 47'; Konradsen 65'; Jebali 72'	Stadium: Kristiansund Stadion; Attendance: 4,277; Referee: Tom Harald Hagen

26 August 2018 20	Sarpsborg 08	1–2	Kristiansund	Sarpsborg
18:00 CEST (UTC+2)	Usman (yellow card) 37'; Schwartz 78'; Vetti (yellow card) 88'	Report	Kastrati (yellow card) 8' (goal) 38'; Kalludra 49'	Stadium: Sarpsborg Stadion; Attendance: 4,773; Referee: Kai Erik Steen

2 September 2018 21	Kristiansund	1–1	Start	Kristiansund
18:00 CEST (UTC+2)	Bye 88'	Report	Berger (yellow card) 23'; Shala 32'; Käck (yellow card) 70'	Stadium: Kristiansund Stadion; Attendance: 3,861; Referee: Tommy Skjerven

16 September 2018 22	Molde	3–2	Kristiansund	Molde
19:00 CEST (UTC+2)	Sarr 12', 51'; Forren (yellow card) 39'; Eikrem 56'; Remmer (yellow card) 81'	Report	Kastrati 26' (yellow card) 64'; Diop (yellow card) 70'; Bye 71'	Stadium: Aker Stadion; Attendance: 7,911; Referee: Trond Ivar Døvle

23 September 2018 23	Kristiansund	2–1	Haugesund	Kristiansund
18:00 CEST (UTC+2)	Kastrati (yellow card) 48' (goal) 58'; Coly (yellow card) 52'; Kalludra 74'	Report	Skjerve 38'; Leite (yellow card) 73'	Stadium: Kristiansund Stadion; Attendance: 3,753; Referee: Dag Vidar Hafsås

30 September 2018 24	Ranheim	2–1	Kristiansund	Trondheim
18:00 CEST (UTC+2)	Sørløkk (yellow card) 64'; Karlsen 69' (pen.), 74' (pen.) (penalty missed) 86'; Løkberg (yellow card) 89'	Report	Coly 32' (yellow card) 74'; Aasmundsen (yellow card) 35'	Stadium: EXTRA Arena; Attendance: 2,030; Referee: Tom Harald Hagen

7 October 2018 25	Kristiansund	5–1	Tromsø	Kristiansund
18:00 CEST (UTC+2)	Kastrati (yellow card) 11'; Kalludra 35', 85'; Gjertsen 66', 80'; Bye 75' (pen.); Psyché (yellow card) 90'	Report	Ingebrigtsen (yellow card) 72'; Bakenga 87'	Stadium: Kristiansund Stadion; Attendance: 4,251; Referee: Espen Eskås

21 October 2018 26	Vålerenga	0–2	Kristiansund	Oslo
18:00 CEST (UTC+2)		Report	Kalludra 51'; Kastrati 62'	Stadium: Intility Arena; Attendance: 7,927; Referee: Tore Hansen

28 October 2018 27	Kristiansund	3–2	Sandefjord	Kristiansund
18:00 CET (UTC+1)	Kastrati (yellow card) 14'; Sørli 27'; D.Ulvestad 33', 63' (yellow card) 61'	Report	Vales (yellow card) 14'; Rufo 19', 86'	Stadium: Kristiansund Stadion; Attendance: 4,045; Referee: Trygve Kjensli

3 November 2018 28	Stabæk	0–1	Kristiansund	Bærum
18:00 CET (UTC+1)		Report	Coly (yellow card) 26' (goal) 80'	Stadium: Nadderud Stadion; Attendance: 3,471; Referee: Svein Oddvar Moen

11 November 2018 29	Kristiansund	3–1	Brann	Kristiansund
18:00 CET (UTC+1)	Hopmark 40'; Diop 55'; Ulvestad (yellow card) 74' (goal) 89'; Sørmo (yellow card) 75'	Report	Rólantsson (yellow card) 29'; Haugen (yellow card) 38'; Barmen (yellow card) 43'; Bamba 59'	Stadium: Kristiansund Stadion; Attendance: 4,215; Referee: Rhoit Saggi

24 November 2018 30	Lillestrøm	2–0	Kristiansund	Lillestrøm
18:00 CET (UTC+1)	Smárason 15'; Olsen 85'	Report	Diop (yellow card) 64'	Stadium: Åråsen Stadion; Attendance: 6,783; Referee: Svein Oddvar Moen

==== Table ====
Pos	Team	Pld	W	D	L	GF	GA	GD	Pts	Qualification or relegation
3	Brann	30	17	7	6	45	31	+14	58	Qualification for the Europa League first qualifying round
4	Haugesund	30	16	5	9	45	33	+12	53	Qualification for the Europa League first qualifying round
5	Kristiansund	30	13	7	10	46	41	+5	46	
6	Vålerenga	30	11	9	10	39	44	−5	42	
7	Ranheim	30	12	6	12	43	50	−7	42	

Source: Football Association of Norway (in Norwegian), Soccerway
Rules for classification: 1) Points; 2) Goal difference; 3) Goals scored; 4) Head-to-head points; 5) Head-to-head goal difference; 6) Head-to-head away goals scored (only if between two teams); 7) Head-to-head goals scored; 8) Play-off (only used to decide champions or relegation).

=== Norwegian Cup ===
18 April 2018 First Round	Sunndal	0–4	Kristiansund	Sunndalsøra
18:00 CEST (UTC+2)	P.Melkild (yellow card) 90'; J.Hafstad (yellow card) 90+4'	Report	Stokke 36'; Coly 60'; Kalludra 72'; Sørmo 90+4'	Stadium: Sande Stadion; Attendance: 600; Referee: Marte Sørø

2 May 2018 Second Round	Bergsøy	0–6	Kristiansund	Bergsøy
18:00 CEST (UTC+2)	F.Skorpen (yellow card) 27'	Report	Stokke 26', 30', 52'; Bye 40'; Kalludra 69'; Sørli 82'	Stadium: Havila Stadium; Referee: Mathias Smehus Kringstad

10 May 2018 Third Round	Hødd	2–0	Kristiansund	Ulsteinvik
18:00 CEST (UTC+2)	S.Moltu 24'; Osvold 43'; A.Breimyr (yellow card) 68'; D.Eid (yellow card) 87'; J.Wrele (yellow card) 90+1'	Report	Diop (yellow card) 71'	Stadium: Høddvoll Stadion; Attendance: 1,159; Referee: Tommy Skjerven

== Squad statistics ==
=== Appearances and goals ===
As of match played 24 November 2018

No.	Pos	Nat	Player	Total		Eliteserien		Norwegian Cup	
No.	Pos	Nat	Player	Apps	Goals	Apps	Goals	Apps	Goals
1	GK	(Republic of Ireland) IRL	Sean McDermott	32	0	29	0	2+1	0
3	DF	(Norway) NOR	Christoffer Aasbak	26	1	25+1	1	0	0
4	DF	(France) FRA	Christophe Psyché	13	0	9+4	0	0	0
5	DF	(Norway) NOR	Dan Peter Ulvestad	29	4	27	4	2	0
6	MF	(Estonia) EST	Brent Lepistu	18	0	3+12	0	3	0
7	FW	(Norway) NOR	Torgil Øwre Gjertsen	25	3	23+1	3	0+1	0
8	MF	(Norway) NOR	Pål Erik Ulvestad	13	0	11+1	0	1	0
9	MF	(Sweden) SWE	Liridon Kalludra	28	8	22+4	6	2	2
11	FW	(Kosovo) KOS	Flamur Kastrati	8	4	8	4	0	0
12	GK	(Estonia) EST	Andreas Vaikla	2	0	1	0	1	0
13	FW	(Norway) NOR	Bendik Bye	32	10	19+10	9	3	1
14	FW	(Norway) NOR	Jesper Isaksen	3	0	0+1	0	1+1	0
15	DF	(Norway) NOR	Erlend Sivertsen	12	0	5+4	0	3	0
16	MF	(Norway) NOR	Jonas Rønningen	3	0	1+2	0	0	0
17	DF	(Senegal) SEN	Aliou Coly	24	3	21+2	2	1	1
18	MF	(Norway) NOR	Stian Aasmundsen	29	4	25+2	4	0+2	0
19	DF	(Norway) NOR	Andreas Hopmark	21	1	19+1	1	1	0
20	FW	(Sweden) SWE	Simon Alexandersson	10	0	2+8	0	0	0
21	MF	(Senegal) SEN	Amidou Diop	26	1	21+3	1	2	0
22	MF	(Norway) NOR	Bent Sørmo	29	1	23+3	0	3	1
24	MF	(Norway) NOR	Sondre Sørli	26	2	5+18	1	3	1
25	DF	(Norway) NOR	Henrik Gjesdal	2	0	0+2	0	0	0
30	MF	(Norway) NOR	Tobias Lysø	1	0	0	0	0+1	0
Players away from Kristiansund on loan:
2	DF	(Norway) NOR	Joakim Bjerkås	1	0	0+1	0	0	0
Players who left Kristiansund during the season:
11	FW	(Ivory Coast) CIV	Daouda Bamba	21	7	18	7	0+3	0
20	MF	(Norway) NOR	Benjamin Stokke	15	4	8+4	0	3	4
27	DF	(Estonia) EST	Nikita Baranov	9	0	5+2	0	2	0

=== Goal scorers ===
As of match played 7 October 2018

Place	Position	Nation	Number	Name	Eliteserien	Norwegian Cup	Total
1	FW	(Norway)	13	Bendik Bye	9	1	10
2	MF	(Sweden)	9	Liridon Kalludra	6	2	8
3	FW	(Ivory Coast)	11	Daouda Bamba	7	0	7
4	MF	(Norway)	18	Stian Aasmundsen	4	0	4
4	FW	(Kosovo)	11	Flamur Kastrati	4	0	4
4	DF	(Norway)	5	Dan Peter Ulvestad	4	0	4
4	MF	(Norway)	20	Benjamin Stokke	0	4	4
8	FW	(Norway)	7	Torgil Øwre Gjertsen	3	0	3
8	DF	(Senegal)	17	Aliou Coly	2	1	3
8				Own goal	3	0	3
11	MF	(Norway)	24	Sondre Sørli	1	1	2
12	DF	(Norway)	3	Christoffer Aasbak	1	0	1
12	DF	(Norway)	19	Andreas Hopmark	1	0	1
12	MF	(Senegal)	21	Amidou Diop	1	0	1
12	MF	(Norway)	22	Bent Sørmo	0	1	1
				TOTALS	46	10	56

=== Disciplinary record ===
As of match played 7 October 2018

Number	Nation	Position	Name	Eliteserien		Norwegian Cup		Total	
Number	Nation	Position	Name	Booked	Sent off (straight red)	Booked	Sent off (straight red)	Booked	Sent off (straight red)
1	(Republic of Ireland)	GK	Sean McDermott	3	0	0	0	3	0
3	(Norway)	DF	Christoffer Aasbak	2	0	0	0	2	0
4	(France)	DF	Christophe Psyché	1	0	0	0	1	0
5	(Norway)	DF	Dan Peter Ulvestad	3	0	0	0	3	0
6	(Estonia)	MF	Brent Lepistu	3	0	0	0	3	0
7	(Norway)	FW	Torgil Øwre Gjertsen	1	0	0	0	1	0
8	(Norway)	MF	Pål Erik Ulvestad	2	0	0	0	2	0
11	(Kosovo)	FW	Flamur Kastrati	6	0	0	0	6	0
16	(Norway)	FW	Jonas Rønningen	1	0	0	0	1	0
17	(Senegal)	DF	Aliou Coly	5	1	0	0	5	1
18	(Norway)	MF	Stian Aasmundsen	4	0	0	0	4	0
19	(Norway)	DF	Andreas Hopmark	1	0	0	0	1	0
21	(Senegal)	MF	Amidou Diop	5	0	1	0	6	0
22	(Norway)	MF	Bent Sørmo	5	0	0	0	5	0
24	(Norway)	MF	Sondre Sørli	1	0	0	0	1	0
Players who left Kristiansund during the season:
20	(Norway)	MF	Benjamin Stokke	1	0	0	0	1	0
11	(Ivory Coast)	FW	Daouda Bamba	3	0	0	0	3	0
27	(Estonia)	DF	Nikita Baranov	3	0	0	0	3	0
			TOTALS	49	1	1	0	50	1
