= 2017 Kristiansund BK season =

Kristiansund
2017 season
- Chairman: Vidar Solli
- Manager: Christian Michelsen
- Stadium: Kristiansund Stadion
- Eliteserien: 7th
- Norwegian Cup: Quarter-final vs Molde
- Top goalscorer: League: Benjamin Stokke (10); All: Benjamin Stokke (12)
Home colours	Away colours	Third colours

The 2017 season is Kristiansund's first season in Eliteserien.

== Squad ==
As of 23 August 2017

Note: Flags indicate national team as defined under FIFA eligibility rules; some limited exceptions apply. Players may hold more than one non-FIFA nationality.

No.	Pos.	Nation	Player
1	GK	IRL	Sean McDermott
2	DF	NOR	Joakim Bjerkås
3	DF	NOR	Christoffer Aasbak
5	DF	NOR	Dan Peter Ulvestad
6	FW	NOR	Tor Erik Torske
7	FW	NOR	Torgil Gjertsen
8	MF	NOR	Pål Erik Ulvestad
9	MF	SWE	Liridon Kalludra
10	MF	NOR	Sverre Økland
11	FW	CIV	Daouda Bamba
12	MF	SEN	Amidou Diop
15	DF	NOR	Erlend Sivertsen
16	FW	NOR	Jonas Rønningen

No.	Pos.	Nation	Player
17	DF	SEN	Aliou Coly
18	FW	SEN	Jean Alassane Mendy
19	DF	NOR	Andreas Hopmark
20	FW	NOR	Benjamin Stokke
21	MF	NOR	Andreas Rødsand
22	MF	NOR	Olav Øby (loan from Sarpsborg 08)
23	GK	SWE	Conny Månsson
24	MF	NOR	Sondre Sørli
25	DF	NOR	Henrik Gjesdal
27	DF	EST	Nikita Baranov
36	MF	NOR	Magne Hoseth
50	FW	NOR	Jesper Isaksen

== Transfers ==
=== Winter ===
In: Note: Flags indicate national team as defined under FIFA eligibility rules; some limited exceptions apply. Players may hold more than one non-FIFA nationality.

No.	Pos.	Nation	Player
1	GK	IRL	Sean McDermott (from (Norway) Ull/Kisa)
3	DF	NOR	Christoffer Aasbak (from (Norway) Hødd)
4	MF	NGR	Thompson Ekpe (loan from (Norway) Molde, previously on loan)
13	GK	CRO	Ante Knezovic (from (Norway) Bryne)
20	FW	NOR	Benjamin Stokke (from (Norway) Levanger)
22	MF	NOR	Kamer Qaka (from (Norway) Sarpsborg 08, previously on loan)
25	DF	NOR	Henrik Gjesdal (free agent)
27	DF	EST	Nikita Baranov (from (Estonia) Flora)

Out: Note: Flags indicate national team as defined under FIFA eligibility rules; some limited exceptions apply. Players may hold more than one non-FIFA nationality.

No.	Pos.	Nation	Player
1	GK	NOR	Alexander Hovdevik (to (Norway) Ranheim)
4	DF	SEN	Bocar Seck (loan return to (Norway) Bærum)
13	GK	SEN	Sergine Mor Mbaye
14	DF	NOR	Espen Næss Lund
17	DF	NOR	Victor Grodås (loan return to (Norway) Sogndal)
22	MF	NOR	Ole Rødahl
28	FW	NOR	Mahmoud El Haj
34	MF	NOR	Sigur Koksvik
77	FW	NOR	Rozhat Shaswari

=== Summer ===
In: Note: Flags indicate national team as defined under FIFA eligibility rules; some limited exceptions apply. Players may hold more than one non-FIFA nationality.

No.	Pos.	Nation	Player
7	FW	NOR	Torgil Gjertsen (from (Norway) Ranheim)
12	MF	SEN	Amidou Diop (from (Norway) Molde)
21	MF	NOR	Andreas Rødsand (from (Norway) Nest-Sotra)
22	MF	NOR	Olav Øby (on loan from (Norway) Sarpsborg 08)
36	MF	NOR	Magne Hoseth (from (Norway) Notodden)

Out: Note: Flags indicate national team as defined under FIFA eligibility rules; some limited exceptions apply. Players may hold more than one non-FIFA nationality.

No.	Pos.	Nation	Player
4	MF	NGR	Thompson Ekpe (loan return to (Norway) Molde)
7	FW	NOR	Rocky Lekaj (to (Norway) Fredrikstad)
22	MF	NOR	Kamer Qaka (released)

== Competitions ==
=== Eliteserien ===
==== Results summary ====
Overall								Home						Away					
Pld	W	D	L	GF	GA	GD	Pts	W	D	L	GF	GA	GD	W	D	L	GF	GA	GD
30	10	10	10	44	46	−2	40	6	7	2	25	19	+6	4	3	8	19	27	−8

Last updated: 26 November 2017.
Source: see below

==== Results by round ====
Round	1	2	3	4	5	6	7	8	9	10	11	12	13	14	15	16	17	18	19	20	21	22	23	24	25	26	27	28	29	30
Ground	H	A	H	A	A	H	A	H	A	H	H	A	H	A	H	A	H	A	H	A	H	A	H	A	H	A	H	A	H	A
Result	L	L	W	L	L	W	D	D	L	W	D	L	D	W	D	L	D	L	D	L	W	D	W	W	L	D	D	W	W	W
Position	11	14	12	14	16	14	13	14	14	13	14	15	14	13	13	14	14	14	14	14	14	13	12	10	12	12	12	11	10	7

Updated to match(es) played on 26 November 2017. Source: see below
A = Away; H = Home; W = Win; D = Draw; L = Loss

==== Results ====
1 April 2017 1	Kristiansund	0–1	Molde	Kristiansund
18:00 CEST (UTC+2)	Sørli (yellow card) 65'	Report	Sarr (yellow card) 30'; Remmer (yellow card) 49'; Brustad 51'; Linde (yellow card) 90+2'	Stadium: Kristiansund Stadion; Attendance: 4,104; Referee: Tom Harald Hagen

5 April 2017 2	Odd	2–0	Kristiansund	Skien
19:00 CEST (UTC+2)	Nilsen (yellow card) 17'; Occéan 22'; Broberg (yellow card) 35'; Grøgaard 60'; Ruud (yellow card) 90'	Report		Stadium: Skagerak Arena; Attendance: 9,049; Referee: Martin Lundby

10 April 2017 3	Kristiansund	1–0	Brann	Kristiansund
19:00 CEST (UTC+2)	Coly (yellow card) 60'; Økland 72' (pen.)	Report	Nilsen (yellow card) 61'; Wormgoor (yellow card) 88'; Karadas (yellow card) 90+2'	Stadium: Kristiansund Stadion; Attendance: 3,905; Referee: Svein Odvar Moen

17 April 2017 4	Sandefjord	2–0	Kristiansund	Sandefjord
18:00 CEST (UTC+2)	Kurtovic (yellow card) 61'; Kastrati 67' (pen.); Sødlund 78'	Report		Stadium: Komplett Arena; Attendance: 3,356; Referee: Kai Erik Steen

23 April 2017 5	Sarpsborg 08	5–1	Kristiansund	Sarpsborg
18:00 CEST (UTC+2)	Mortensen 14'; Lindberg 33'; Thomassen (yellow card) 50'; Nielsen 63', 76'; Fejzullahu 82'	Report	Baranov (yellow card) 6'; Qaka (yellow card) 17'; Jørgensen 47' (o.g.); Sørli (yellow card) 62'	Stadium: Sarpsborg Stadion; Attendance: 4,121; Referee: Martin Lundby

30 April 2017 6	Kristiansund	2–0	Strømsgodset	Kristiansund
18:00 CEST (UTC+2)	Mendy 66'; Bamba 83'	Report	Jradi (yellow card) 68'	Stadium: Kristiansund Stadion; Attendance: 3,658; Referee: ESpen Eskås

7 May 2017 7	Tromsø	1–1	Kristiansund	Tromsø
18:00 CEST (UTC+2)	Olsen 10'	Report	Stokke 39'	Stadium: Alfheim Stadion; Attendance: 3,068; Referee: Dag Vidar Hafsås

13 May 2017 8	Kristiansund	1–1	Lillestrøm	Kristiansund
18:00 CEST (UTC+2)	Bamba (yellow card) 25'; Rønningen 65'; P.Ulvestad (yellow card) 87'	Report	Mikalsen (yellow card) 55'; Malec (yellow card) 75'; Rafn 84'; Innocent (red card) 90+2'	Stadium: Kristiansund Stadion; Attendance: 3,794; Referee: Kristoffer Hagenes

16 May 2017 9	Vålerenga	1–0	Kristiansund	Oslo
18:00 CEST (UTC+2)	Lundström 53'; Zahid (yellow card) 70'	Report	Bamba (yellow card) 55'; Baranov (yellow card) 85'; Qaka (yellow card) 90'	Stadium: Ullevaal Stadion; Attendance: 7,226; Referee: Tore Hansen

21 May 2017 10	Kristiansund	3–2	Haugesund	Kristiansund
18:00 CEST (UTC+2)	Qaka (yellow card) 44'; Stokke 46'; McDermott (yellow card) 53'; Sørli 60'; Mendy 84'	Report	Haraldseid (yellow card) 1'; McDermott 52' (o.g.); D.Ulvestad 62' (o.g.)	Stadium: Kristiansund Stadion; Attendance: 3,392; Referee: Trond Ivar Døvle

28 May 2017 11	Kristiansund	1–1	Sogndal	Kristiansund
18:00 CEST (UTC+2)	Mendy 36'	Report	Wæhler (yellow card) 19'; Schulze 58'	Stadium: Kristiansund Stadion; Attendance: 3,509; Referee: Dag Vidar Hafsås

4 June 2017 12	Viking	2–1	Kristiansund	Stavanger
18:00 CEST (UTC+2)	Adegbenro (yellow card) 3'; Appiah 55' (pen.); Pedersen 90+5'	Report	P.Ulvestad (yellow card) 22'; Mendy 62'; Baranov (yellow card) 79'; McDermott (yellow card) 90+2'	Stadium: Viking Stadion; Attendance: 7,261; Referee: Kristoffer Hagenes

17 June 2017 13	Kristiansund	1–1	Aalesund	Kristiansund
18:00 CEST (UTC+2)	Stokke 60'; Aasbak (yellow card) 62'; Bamba (yellow card) 81'	Report	Veldwijk 21'; Arnarson (yellow card) 71'	Stadium: Kristiansund Stadion; Attendance: 4,033; Referee: Tommy Skjerven

25 June 2017 14	Stabæk	1–4	Kristiansund	Bærum
18:00 CEST (UTC+2)	Nimely 55'; Olsen (red card) 88'	Report	Mendy 14'; Stokke 63', 67', 79'	Stadium: Nadderud Stadion; Attendance: 3,835; Referee: Dag Vidar Hafsås

3 July 2017 15	Kristiansund	3–3	Rosenborg	Kristiansund
19:00 CEST (UTC+2)	Mendy 55', 61'; Sørli 83'	Report	Vilhjálmsson 30'; Midtsjø (yellow card) 31'; Konradsen 44'; Bendtner 90+1'	Stadium: Kristiansund Stadion; Attendance: 4,126; Referee: Tommy Skjerven

9 July 2017 16	Strømsgodset	4–2	Kristiansund	Drammen
18:00 CEST (UTC+2)	Andersen 6'; D.Ulvestad 15' (o.g.); Pedersen 17'; Júnior (yellow card) 25'; Nguen 35'; Hauger (yellow card) 66'; Vilsvik (yellow card) 87'	Report	Kalludra 62' (yellow card) 87'; Bamba 64'	Stadium: Marienlyst Stadion; Attendance: 6,131; Referee: Trond Ivar Døvle

17 July 2017 17	Kristiansund	1–1	Vålerenga	Kristiansund
19:00 CEST (UTC+2)	Aasbak 28'	Report	Sandberg (yellow card) 27'; Zahid 55'	Stadium: Kristiansund Stadion; Attendance: 4,050; Referee: Dag Vidar Hafsås

5 August 2017 18	Rosenborg	4–1	Kristiansund	Trondheim
18:00 CEST (UTC+2)	Helland 13'; Bendtner 39' (pen.), 75'; Jevtović 76'	Report	Ulvestad (yellow card) 20'; Bamba 58'	Stadium: Lerkendal Stadion; Attendance: 17,214; Referee: Svein Oddvar Moen

13 August 2017 19	Kristiansund	2–2	Sarpsborg 08	Kristiansund
18:00 CEST (UTC+2)	Rønningen 35'; Bjerkås (yellow card) 90'; Mendy 90+4'	Report	Rosted (yellow card) 34'; Mortensen 61'; Albech (yellow card) 70'; Diatta 80'	Stadium: Kristiansund Stadion; Attendance: 3,498; Referee: Rohit Saggi

20 August 2017 20	Sogndal	2–0	Kristiansund	Sogndalsfjøra
18:00 CEST (UTC+2)	Koomson 15' (pen.); Nwakali 76'	Report	Bjerkås (yellow card) 15'; Sørli (yellow card) 72'	Stadium: Fosshaugane Campus; Attendance: 2,987; Referee: Trygve Kjensli

10 September 2017 21	Kristiansund	4–1	Tromsø	Kristiansund
18:00 CEST (UTC+2)	Stokke 8', 45'; Mendy 36'; Gjertsen 48'; Kalludra (yellow card) 60'	Report	Ingebrigtsen 90+2'	Stadium: Kristiansund Stadion; Attendance: 3,751; Referee: Tom Harald Hagen

17 September 2017 22	Lillestrøm	0–0	Kristiansund	Lillestrøm
18:00 CEST (UTC+2)	Tagbajumi (yellow card) 64'	Report	Øby (yellow card) 38'; Coly (yellow card) 81'	Stadium: Åråsen Stadion; Attendance: 4,569; Referee: Rohit Saggi

24 September 2017 23	Kristiansund	1–0	Stabæk	Kristiansund
18:00 CEST (UTC+2)	Gjertsen 13'; Hopmark (yellow card) 22'	Report	Hernández (yellow card) 41'; Brochmann (yellow card) 83'	Stadium: Kristiansund Stadion; Attendance: 3,874; Referee: Sigurd Smehus Kringstad

29 September 2017 24	Brann	0–4	Kristiansund	Bergen
19:00 CEST (UTC+2)		Report	Stokke 44', 66'; Hopmark (yellow card) 27'; Baranov (yellow card) 41'; Gjertsen 44', 70'	Stadium: Brann Stadion; Attendance: 10,025; Referee: Martin Lundby

15 October 2017 25	Kristiansund	0–2	Viking	Kristiansund
18:00 CEST (UTC+2)	Coly (yellow card) 25' (yellow-red card) 67'	Report	Ryerson 15'; Danielsen (yellow card) 25'; Ernemann (yellow card) 28'; Haugen 62'	Stadium: Kristiansund Stadion; Attendance: 3,771; Referee: Kristoffer Hagenes

21 October 2017 26	Aalesund	1–1	Kristiansund	Ålesund
18:00 CEST (UTC+2)	Papazoglou (yellow card) 41'; Arnarson (yellow card) 89'; Hoff 90+4'	Report	Diop (yellow card) 58' (yellow-red card) 68'; Gjertsen 86'	Stadium: Color Line Stadion; Attendance: 7,347; Referee: Dag Vidar Hafsås

29 October 2017 27	Kristiansund	2–2	Odd	Kristiansund
18:00 CET (UTC+1)	Bamba 19'; Gjertsen 46'	Report	Haugen 3'; Nilsen (yellow card) 32'; Ruud 89'	Stadium: Kristiansund Stadion; Attendance: 3,822; Referee: Martin Lundby

4 November 2017 28	Molde	0–1	Kristiansund	Molde
18:00 CET (UTC+1)	Aursnes (yellow card) 49'; Forren (yellow card) 85'; Brustad (yellow card) 90'	Report	Stokke (yellow card) 67'; Bamba 70' (yellow card) 70'	Stadium: Aker Stadion; Attendance: 9,014; Referee: Ola Hobber Nilsen

19 November 2017 29	Kristiansund	3–2	Sandefjord	Kristiansund
18:00 CEST (UTC+2)	Bamba 10'; Gjertsen 30' (yellow card) 54'; Økland 72'	Report	Kastrati 36' van Berkel (yellow card) 56'; Kane 70' (yellow card) 83'	Stadium: Kristiansund Stadion; Attendance: 4,080; Referee: Espen Eskås

26 November 2017 30	Haugesund	2–3	Kristiansund	Haugesund
18:00 CEST (UTC+2)	Gytkjær 32', 45+1'; Andreassen (yellow card) 90+3'; Sandvik (yellow card) 90+5'	Report	Sørli 19'; Gjertsen 51'; Bamba 66'; Coly (yellow card) 86'	Stadium: Haugesund Stadion; Attendance: 4,834; Referee: Kristoffer Hagenes

==== Table ====
Pos	Team	Pld	W	D	L	GF	GA	GD	Pts
5	Brann	30	13	8	9	51	36	+15	47
6	Odd	30	12	6	12	27	39	−12	42
7	Kristiansund	30	10	10	10	44	46	−2	40
8	Vålerenga	30	11	6	13	48	46	+2	39
9	Stabæk	30	10	9	11	46	50	−4	39

Source: Football Association of Norway (in Norwegian), Soccerway
Rules for classification: 1) Points; 2) Goal difference; 3) Goals scored; 4) Head-to-head points; 5) Head-to-head goal difference; 6) Head-to-head away goals scored (only if between two teams); 7) Head-to-head goals scored; 8) Play-off (only used to decide champions or relegation).

=== Norwegian Cup ===
26 April 2017 First Round	Brattvåg	0–3	Kristiansund	Brattvåg
18:00 CEST (UTC+2)	Grytten (yellow card) 15'; Adeyeye (yellow card) 39'; Leine (yellow card) 73'; Wembangomo (yellow card) 90+2'	Report	Aasbak 47'; Kalludra (yellow card) 75'; Rønningen 80'; Mendy 90+2'	Stadium: Brattvåg Gras; Attendance: 403; Referee: Mads Skarsem

24 May 2017 Second Round	Verdal	0–4	Kristiansund	Verdalsøra
18:00 CEST (UTC+2)	J.Haug (yellow card) 70'	Report	Lekaj 4'; Stokke 68'; Rønningen 75'; Hopmark 87'	Stadium: Verdal Stadion; Attendance: 225; Referee: Kim Rune Borgersen

31 May 2017 Third Round	Ranheim	0–2	Kristiansund	Trondheim
18:30 CEST (UTC+2)	Reginiussen (yellow card) 33'	Report	Mendy 49'; Bamba 52'	Stadium: EXTRA Arena; Attendance: 333; Referee: Torkjell Jonsson Trædal

9 August 2017 Fourth Round	Kristiansund	1–0	Florø	Kristiansund
18:00 CEST (UTC+2)	Kalludra 52' (yellow card) 79'	Report	C.Husa (yellow card) 27'; E.Kupen (yellow card) 79'	Stadium: Kristiansund Stadion; Attendance: 2,613; Referee: Sigurd Smehus Kringstad

27 August 2017 Quarterfinal	Molde	2–1	Kristiansund	Molde
17:45 CEST (UTC+2)	Haaland 75' (yellow card) 89'; Ellingsen 78'	Report	Stokke 8' (yellow card) 56'; Coly (yellow card) 35'	Stadium: Aker Stadion; Attendance: 7,755; Referee: Ola Hobber Nilsen

== Squad statistics ==
As of match played 26 November 2017

=== Appearances and goals ===
No.	Pos	Nat	Player	Total		Eliteserien		Norwegian Cup	
No.	Pos	Nat	Player	Apps	Goals	Apps	Goals	Apps	Goals
1	GK	(Republic of Ireland) IRL	Sean McDermott	30	0	28	0	2	0
2	DF	(Norway) NOR	Joakim Bjerkås	11	0	7+1	0	3	0
3	DF	(Norway) NOR	Christoffer Aasbak	29	2	24	1	4+1	1
5	DF	(Norway) NOR	Dan Peter Ulvestad	32	0	27+1	0	3+1	0
6	FW	(Norway) NOR	Tor Erik Torske	7	0	0+4	0	2+1	0
7	FW	(Norway) NOR	Torgil Gjertsen	13	8	11+1	8	1	0
8	MF	(Norway) NOR	Pål Erik Ulvestad	27	0	16+8	0	2+1	0
9	MF	(Sweden) SWE	Liridon Kalludra	26	2	19+3	1	3+1	1
10	MF	(Norway) NOR	Sverre Økland	17	2	13	2	4	0
11	FW	(Ivory Coast) CIV	Daouda Bamba	25	8	15+7	7	1+2	1
12	MF	(Senegal) SEN	Amidou Diop	7	0	2+4	0	1	0
13	GK	(Croatia) CRO	Ante Knezovic	2	0	1	0	1	0
15	DF	(Norway) NOR	Erlend Sivertsen	2	0	2	0	0	0
16	FW	(Norway) NOR	Jonas Rønningen	32	4	17+11	2	1+3	2
17	DF	(Senegal) SEN	Aliou Coly	25	0	22+1	0	2	0
18	FW	(Senegal) SEN	Jean Alassane Mendy	27	11	16+6	9	5	2
19	DF	(Norway) NOR	Andreas Hopmark	31	1	25+2	0	2+2	1
20	FW	(Norway) NOR	Benjamin Stokke	35	12	28+2	10	2+3	2
22	MF	(Norway) NOR	Olav Øby	10	0	6+3	0	1	0
23	GK	(Sweden) SWE	Conny Månsson	3	0	1	0	2	0
24	MF	(Norway) NOR	Sondre Sørli	26	3	10+13	3	2+1	0
25	DF	(Norway) NOR	Henrik Gjesdal	9	0	6+2	0	1	0
27	DF	(Estonia) EST	Nikita Baranov	29	0	26	0	3	0
36	MF	(Norway) NOR	Magne Hoseth	3	0	0+3	0	0	0
50	MF	(Norway) NOR	Jesper Isaksen	4	0	0+3	0	1	0
Players away from Kristiansund on loan:
Players who left Kristiansund during the season:
4	MF	(Nigeria) NGR	Thompson Ekpe	7	0	0+6	0	1	0
7	MF	(Norway) NOR	Rocky Lekaj	4	1	0+2	0	2	1
22	MF	(Norway) NOR	Kamer Qaka	10	0	8+1	0	1	0

=== Goal scorers ===
Place	Position	Nation	Number	Name	Eliteserien	Norwegian Cup	Total
1	FW	(Norway)	20	Benjamin Stokke	10	2	12
2	FW	(Senegal)	18	Jean Alassane Mendy	9	2	11
3	FW	(Norway)	7	Torgil Gjertsen	8	0	8
3	FW	(Ivory Coast)	11	Daouda Bamba	7	1	8
5	FW	(Norway)	16	Jonas Rønningen	2	2	4
6	MF	(Norway)	24	Sondre Sørli	3	0	3
7	MF	(Norway)	10	Sverre Økland	2	0	2
7	DF	(Norway)	3	Christoffer Aasbak	1	1	2
7	MF	(Sweden)	9	Liridon Kalludra	1	1	2
10	MF	(Norway)	7	Rocky Lekaj	0	1	1
10	DF	(Norway)	19	Andreas Hopmark	0	1	1
10				Own goal	1	0	1
				TOTALS	44	11	55

=== Disciplinary record ===
Number	Nation	Position	Name	Eliteserien		Norwegian Cup		Total	
Number	Nation	Position	Name	Yellow card	Red card	Yellow card	Red card	Yellow card	Red card
1	(Republic of Ireland)	GK	Sean McDermott	2	0	0	0	2	0
2	(Norway)	DF	Joakim Bjerkås	2	0	0	0	2	0
3	(Norway)	DF	Christoffer Aasbak	1	0	0	0	1	0
7	(Norway)	FW	Torgil Gjertsen	1	0	0	0	1	0
8	(Norway)	MF	Pål Erik Ulvestad	3	0	0	0	3	0
9	(Sweden)	MF	Liridon Kalludra	2	0	2	0	4	0
11	(Ivory Coast)	FW	Daouda Bamba	4	0	0	0	4	0
12	(Senegal)	MF	Amidou Diop	2	1	0	0	2	1
17	(Senegal)	DF	Aliou Coly	5	1	1	0	6	1
19	(Norway)	DF	Andreas Hopmark	2	0	0	0	2	0
20	(Norway)	FW	Benjamin Stokke	1	0	1	0	2	0
22	(Norway)	MF	Kamer Qaka	3	0	0	0	3	0
22	(Norway)	MF	Olav Øby	1	0	0	0	1	0
24	(Norway)	MF	Sondre Sørli	3	0	0	0	3	0
27	(Estonia)	DF	Nikita Baranov	4	0	0	0	4	0
			TOTALS	34	2	4	0	40	2
