= 2025 Kristiansund BK season =

Kristiansund
2025 season
- Chairman: Vidar Solli
- Head coach: Amund Skiri
- Stadium: Kristiansund Stadion
- Eliteserien: 13th
- 2025 Norwegian Cup: Semi-finals
- 2025–26 Norwegian Cup: Third round
Home colours	Away colours	Third colours

The 2025 season was the 22nd season in the history of Kristiansund and their second consecutive season in the top flight of Norwegian football. The club competed in the Eliteserien and the Norwegian Football Cup

On 19 February 2025, American back Ian Hoffmann joined on loan from Lech Poznań of Poland, initially through the end of June. The loan was extended to the end of the season on 1 July.

== Transfers ==
=== In ===
Pos.	Player	Transferred from	Fee	Date	Source
FW	(Nigeria) Mustapha Isah	(Denmark) Randers FC	Undisclosed	26 January 2025	
DF	(Denmark) Frederik Flex	(Italy) Parma U19	Undisclosed	29 January 2025	
DF	(United States) Ian Hoffmann	(Poland) Lech Poznań	Loan	19 February 2025	

=== Out ===
Pos.	Player	Transferred to	Fee	Date	Source
FW	(Norway) Oskar Sivertsen	(Netherlands) Go Ahead Eagles	Undisclosed	4 February 2025	
DF	(Norway) Håkon Sjåtil	(Norway) Vålerenga		18 February 2025	

== Friendlies ==
=== Pre-season ===
24 January 2025 Friendly	Kristiansund (Norway)	6–2	(Norway) Brattvåg
17:00

31 January 2025 Friendly	Hødd (Norway)	0–1	(Norway) Kristiansund
16:30

6 February 2025 Friendly	Kristiansund (Norway)	2–4	(Norway) Brann
14:30		Report

15 February 2025 Friendly	KFUM (Norway)	0–0	(Norway) Kristiansund
13:00

26 February 2025 Friendly	Kristiansund (Norway)	2–1	(Norway) Strømsgodset
17:00

7 March 2025 Friendly	Viking (Norway)	5–2	(Norway) Kristiansund
14:30

8 March 2025 Friendly	Kristiansund (Norway)	0–4	(Norway) Brattvåg
14:00

15 March 2025 Friendly	Molde (Norway)	0–4	(Norway) Kristiansund
13:00

23 March 2025 Friendly	Kristiansund (Norway)	2–1	(Norway) Aalesund
16:00

== Competitions ==
=== Overview ===
Competition	First match	Last match	Starting round	Record							
Competition	First match	Last match	Starting round	Pld	W	D	L	GF	GA	GD	Win %
Eliteserien	30 March 2025	30 November 2025	Matchday 1	8	3	1	4	10	13	−3	37.50
Norwegian Football Cup	13 April 2025		First round	3	3	0	0	13	2	+11	100.00
Total				11	6	1	4	23	15	+8	54.55

Last updated: 11 May 2025
Source: Competitions

=== Eliteserien ===
==== League table ====
Pos	Team	Pld	W	D	L	GF	GA	GD	Pts	Qualification or relegation
11	HamKam	30	10	7	13	42	47	−5	37	
12	KFUM Oslo	30	8	11	11	42	41	+1	35	
13	Kristiansund	30	9	7	14	34	59	−25	34	
14	Bryne (R)	30	8	7	15	37	56	−19	31	Qualification for the relegation play-offs
15	Strømsgodset (R)	30	6	2	22	37	72	−35	20	Relegation to First Division

Source: Football Association of Norway (in Norwegian)
Rules for classification: 1) Points; 2) Goal difference; 3) Goals scored; 4) Head-to-head points; 5) Head-to-head goal difference; 6) Head-to-head goals scored.
(R) Relegated

==== Results summary ====
Overall								Home						Away					
Pld	W	D	L	GF	GA	GD	Pts	W	D	L	GF	GA	GD	W	D	L	GF	GA	GD
6	2	1	3	8	11	−3	7	1	0	1	2	3	−1	1	1	2	6	8	−2

Last updated: 1 May 2025.

==== Results by round ====
Round	1	2	3	4	5	6	7	8	9	10	11	12	13	14	15	16	17
Ground	A	H	A	H	A	H	A	H	A	H	A	H	H	A	H	A	A
Result	L	W	W	L												L	D
Position	9																

Updated to match(es) played on 1 May 2025. Source:
A = Away; H = Home; W = Win; D = Draw; L = Loss

==== Matches ====
The match schedule was announced on 20 December 2024.

30 March 2025 1	HamKam	2–1	Kristiansund	Hamar
17:00 UTC+2	Jónsson 4'; Lien 59'		Tufekčić 2'	Stadium: Briskeby Stadion; Attendance: 3,316; Referee: Kristoffer Hagenes

6 April 2025 2	Kristiansund	2–1	Bryne	Kristiansund
17:00 UTC+2	Corlu 43'; Tufekčić 87' (pen.)		Moreira 11'	Stadium: Nordmøre Stadion; Attendance: 2,917; Referee: Mathias Støfringshaug

10 April 2025 16	Viking	3–1	Kristiansund	Stavanger
19:00	Bell 47'; Heggheim 58'; Kvia-Egeskog 66'		Tufekcic 28' (pen.)	Stadium: Lyse Arena; Attendance: 9,644; Referee: Mohammad Usman Aslam

20 April 2025 3	Tromsø	2–3	Kristiansund	Tromsø
14:30				Stadium: Romssa Arena; Attendance: 3,632; Referee: Stian Røvig Sletner

27 April 2025 4	Kristiansund	0–2	Vålerenga	Kristiansund
17:00				Stadium: Kristiansund Stadion; Attendance: 3,181; Referee: Kristoffer Hagenes

1 May 2025 17	Rosenborg	1–1	Kristiansund	Trondheim
18:00	Holm 61'		Berntsen Olsen (red card) 7'; Ndour 90+9' (pen.)	Stadium: Lerkendal Stadion; Referee: Mohammad Usman Aslam

4 May 2025 5	Strømsgodset	1–2	Kristiansund	Drammen
17:00				Stadium: Marienlyst Stadion

11 May 2025 6	Kristiansund	0–1	Fredrikstad	Kristiansund
17:00				Stadium: Kristiansund Stadion; Attendance: 3,007; Referee: Svein Tore Sinnes

16 May 2025 7	Molde	v	Kristiansund	Molde
18:00				Stadium: Aker Stadion

=== 2025 Norwegian Football Cup ===
13 April 2025 First round	Melhus IL	1–5	Kristiansund	Melhus
16:00				Stadium: Gruva nye KG11; Referee: Robert Eggen

24 April 2025 Second round	Nardo	1–4	Kristiansund	Trondhiem
18:00				Stadium: Phonereparatøren Arena; Attendance: 276; Referee: Per Oscar Grov Heiberg

7 May 2025 Third round	Alta	0–4	Kristiansund	Alta
18:00				Stadium: SmartDok Arena; Attendance: 742; Referee: Jørgen Haugen

21 May 2025 Fourth round	Molde	v	Kristiansund	Molde
