= Christoffer Aasbak =

Norwegian footballer (born 1993)

Personal information
- Full name: Christoffer Aasbak
- Date of birth: 22 July 1993 (age 33)
- Place of birth: Trondheim, Norway
- Position: Left-back

Team information
- Current team: Ranheim
- Number: 3

Youth career
- –2011: Rosenborg

Senior career*
Years	Team	Apps	(Gls)
2011-2012	Rosenborg	1	(0)
2012	Ranheim	1	(0)
2013–2014	Byåsen	43	(4)
2015–2016	Hødd	53	(1)
2017–2024	Kristiansund	154	(6)
2025–	Ranheim	27	(0)

International career
2008	Norway U15	1	(0)
2009	Norway U16	11	(0)
2010	Norway U17	11	(3)
2011	Norway U18	9	(0)
- * Club domestic league appearances and goals as of 14 November 2026

Christoffer Aasbak (born 22 July 1993) is a Norwegian footballer who plays as a left-back for Ranheim. He has been a prolific youth international for Norway.

== Career ==
On 14 June 2025, Aasbak was announced at Ranheim on a two year contract.

== Career statistics ==
=== Club ===
As of 13 April 2026

Appearances and goals by club, season and competition
Club	Season	League			National cup		Other		Total	
Club	Season	Division	Apps	Goals	Apps	Goals	Apps	Goals	Apps	Goals
Rosenborg	2011	Tippeligaen	1	0	0	0	-		1	0
Rosenborg	2012	Tippeligaen	0	0	1	0	-		1	0
Rosenborg	Total		1	0	1	0	-	-	2	0
Ranheim	2012	Adeccoligaen	1	0	0	0	-		1	0
Ranheim	Total		1	0	0	0	-		1	0
Byåsen	2013	Oddsen-ligaen	19	1	0	0	-		19	1
Byåsen	2014	Oddsen-ligaen	24	3	2	0	-		26	3
Byåsen	Total		43	4	2	0	-		45	4
Hødd	2015	OBOS-ligaen	25	1	2	0	1 (Note: Appearance in the Tippeligaen play-offs)	0	27	1
Hødd	2016	OBOS-ligaen	28	0	2	0	-		30	0
Hødd	Total		53	1	4	0	1	0	57	1
Kristiansund	2017	Eliteserien	24	1	5	1	-		29	2
Kristiansund	2018	Eliteserien	26	1	0	0	-		26	1
Kristiansund	2019	Eliteserien	27	1	0	0	-		27	1
Kristiansund	2020	Eliteserien	23	1	-		-		23	1
Kristiansund	2021	Eliteserien	17	1	3	0	-		20	1
Kristiansund	2022	Eliteserien	14	1	1	0	-		15	1
Kristiansund	2023	OBOS-ligaen	9	0	0	0	1 (Note: Appearance in the Eliteserien play-offs)	1	10	1
Kristiansund	2024	Eliteserien	14	0	2	0	0	0	16	0
Kristiansund	Total		154	6	11	1	1	1	166	8
Ranheim	2025	OBOS-ligaen	15	0	0	0	-		15	0
Ranheim	2026	OBOS-ligaen	1	0	0	0	-		1	0
Ranheim	Total		16	0	0	0	-		16	0
Career total			268	11	18	1	2	1	287	13
