= Haris Cirak =

Swedish footballer (born 1995)

Personal information
- Date of birth: 14 March 1995 (age 31)
- Place of birth: Sweden
- Height: 1.86 m (6 ft 1 in)
- Position: Defensive midfielder

Youth career
- IK Viljan

Senior career*
Years	Team	Apps	(Gls)
2014	Eskilstuna City		
2015–2017	AFC Eskilstuna	16	(0)
2016	→ Elverum (loan)	9	(0)
2017	→ Elverum (loan)	11	(1)
2018	Nest-Sotra	26	(0)
2019	Kristiansund BK	9	(0)
2019–	GAIS	27	(1)
- * Club domestic league appearances and goals

Haris Cirak (born 14 March 1995) is a Swedish footballer who plays as a midfielder.

== Career ==
Born 14 March 1995, Cirak hails from Strängnäs. He moved to Eskilstuna to play for Eskilstuna City FK and AFC Eskilstuna. While at AFC, he was loaned out to Norwegian club Elverum, first in the autumn of 2016 and later in autumn 2017. After the 2018 season, he moved to the Norwegian 1. divisjon on a permanent basis to play for Nest-Sotra. First-tier club Kristiansund BK signed him in 2019, but after half a season with 9 league games and 4 cup games he was sold back to Sweden and GAIS. In September 2019 he tore his cruciate ligament.
