= Atlanten Stadion =

Sports venue in Kristiansund, Norway

Atlanten stadion
- Interactive map of Atlanten stadion
- Full name: Atlanten stadion
- Location: Dalaveien 16B, 6511 Kristiansund N
- Coordinates: 63°7′26″N 7°44′9″E
- Owner: Kristiansund Municipality
- Capacity: 665
- Field size: 105 by 68 metres (114.8 yd × 74.4 yd)

Construction
- Built: 1959–1960
- Opened: July 1960
- Renovated: 2018–2023

Tenants
- Kristiansund BK (football) (2003–2007); Clausenengen FK (football) (1921–2003); IL Norodd (track and field)

Atlanten stadion is a multi-use stadium on the island of Gomalandet in Kristiansund Municipality, Norway. It is currently used mostly for track-and-field competitions, and is the former home ground of Eliteserien team Kristiansund BK. Kristiansund BK played at Atlanten Stadion until 2007, when they moved to Omsundet on the nearby island of Frei. Atlanten Stadion has a rubber track for track and field.

== Renovation ==
As of 2019, Atlanten Stadion is being renovated completely.
