= Amidou Diop =

Senegalese footballer

Personal information
- Date of birth: February 25, 1992 (age 34)
- Place of birth: Missirah, Senegal
- Height: 1.96 m (6 ft 5 in)
- Position: Midfielder

Team information
- Current team: TB Tvøroyri
- Number: 4

Youth career
- 2009–2010: Diambars

Senior career*
| Years | Team | Apps | (Gls) |
| 2010–2014 | Diambars | 11 | (0) |
| 2014–2017 | Molde | 20 | (0) |
| 2015 | → Mjøndalen (loan) | 10 | (0) |
| 2016 | → Kristiansund (loan) | 14 | (6) |
| 2017–2019 | Kristiansund | 59 | (2) |
| 2020 | Adanaspor | 11 | (0) |
| 2020–2022 | Kristiansund | 73 | (4) |
| 2023–2024 | Aalesund | 32 | (0) |
| 2024 | Sarpsborg 08 | 5 | (0) |
| 2025– | TB Tvøroyri | 19 | (0) |

International career
| 2009 | Senegal U17 | | |
| 2009–2010 | Senegal U20 | | |
- * Club domestic league appearances and goals as of 26 October 2025

Amidou Diop (born 25 February 1992) is a Senegalese footballer who plays as a midfielder for Faroe Islands Premier League club TB Tvøroyri. On November 28, 2025, he joined Havnar Bóltfelag (HB) Tórshavn, Faroe Isles.

== Career ==
=== Club ===
Diop had previously been on trial at Lyon and Nancy, before signing for Molde summer 2014, and making his debut on November 2, 2014, against Strømsgodset.

In the spring of 2015 Diop was loaned from Molde FK to Mjøndalen IF.

On 1 August 2017, Diop moved permanently to Kristiansund BK.

In August 2024, Diop joined Sarpsborg on a short-term deal until the end of the 2024 season.

== Career statistics ==
As of match played 13 November 2022

Appearances and goals by club, season and competition
| Club | Season | League | | | National Cup | | Continental | | Total | |
| Club | Season | Division | Apps | Goals | Apps | Goals | Apps | Goals | Apps | Goals |
|---|---|---|---|---|---|---|---|---|---|---|
| Molde | 2014 | Eliteserien | 1 | 0 | 0 | 0 | 0 | 0 | 1 | 0 |
| Molde | 2015 | Eliteserien | 10 | 0 | 0 | 0 | 0 | 0 | 10 | 0 |
| Molde | 2016 | Eliteserien | 8 | 0 | 0 | 0 | 1 | 0 | 9 | 0 |
| Molde | 2017 | Eliteserien | 2 | 0 | 2 | 0 | 0 | 0 | 4 | 0 |
| Molde | Total | | 21 | 0 | 2 | 0 | 1 | 0 | 24 | 0 |
| Mjøndalen (loan) | 2015 | Eliteserien | 10 | 0 | 3 | 0 | - | | 13 | 0 |
| Kristiansund (loan) | 2016 | 1. divisjon | 14 | 6 | 1 | 1 | - | | 15 | 7 |
| Kristiansund | 2017 | Eliteserien | 8 | 0 | 3 | 0 | - | | 11 | 0 |
| Kristiansund | 2018 | Eliteserien | 24 | 1 | 2 | 0 | - | | 26 | 1 |
| Kristiansund | 2019 | Eliteserien | 27 | 1 | 2 | 0 | - | | 29 | 1 |
| Kristiansund | Total | | 59 | 2 | 7 | 0 | 0 | 0 | 66 | 2 |
| Adanaspor | 2019–20 | TFF First League | 11 | 0 | 0 | 0 | - | | 11 | 0 |
| Kristiansund | 2020 | Eliteserien | 18 | 0 | 0 | 0 | - | | 18 | 0 |
| Kristiansund | 2021 | Eliteserien | 27 | 0 | 1 | 1 | - | | 28 | 1 |
| Kristiansund | 2022 | Eliteserien | 28 | 4 | 2 | 0 | - | | 30 | 4 |
| Kristiansund | Total | | 73 | 4 | 3 | 1 | 0 | 0 | 76 | 5 |
| Career total | | | 188 | 13 | 16 | 2 | 1 | 0 | 205 | 15 |
