= Clausenengen FK =

Football club based in Kristiansund, Norway

- Full name: Clausenengen Yoko
- Nickname: Enga
- Short name: CFK
- Founded: 1 June 1921; 104 years ago
- Ground: Idrettsplassen
- Capacity: 4,000
- Chairman: Anders Wiik Mittet
- Manager: Ronny Svanemsli
- League: 4. divisjon (2022)
Home colours

Clausenengen Fotballklubb (CFK) is a football club located in Kristiansund, Norway. Many famous players have played at this club, including Ole Gunnar Solskjær, Øyvind Leonhardsen, Trond Andersen, Jan Erlend Kruse, Andre Flem, Arild Stavrum and Ola Lyngvær. Until 2003, the club played their home games at Atlanten Stadion.

In 2003, the two rivals Kristiansund FK and CFK agreed to establish a new elite team called Kristiansund BK. Clausenengen continued to play in lower divisions. Clausenengen FK, re-established its A team in 2008.
