= Jan Erlend Kruse =

Norwegian footballer (born 1968)

Personal information
- Date of birth: 31 August 1968 (age 58)
- Positions: Defender; midfielder

Youth career
- Nordlandet
- Clausenengen

Senior career*
Years	Team	Apps	(Gls)
–1986	Clausenengen	?	(?)
1987–1989	Brann	40	(4)
1990–1991	Molde	40	(7)
1992	Hamkam	12	(0)
1993	Averøykam		
1994–1998	Vålerenga	47	(3)
1997	→ Skeid (loan)	5	(0)
1998	→ Clausenengen (loan)		
1998–1999	Panionios	16	(1)
2000	Clausenengen		

International career
1986	Norway U17	5	(0)
1988	Norway U21	1	(0)

Managerial career
- Lyn (youth)
- Bækkelaget (youth)
- Bækkelaget
- * Club domestic league appearances and goals

Jan Erlend Kruse (born 31 August 1968) is a Norwegian former football defender.

== Club career ==
Hailing from Kristiansund, he came through the ranks of talent factory Clausenengen before joining first-tier club Brann in 1987. After two seasons there, he took two seasons in Molde and one in Hamkam. In 1993 he spent several months on free transfer before joining third-tier club Averøykameratene in March. He did however manage to return to the top flight with Vålerenga, where he stayed until the summer of 1997 when he was loaned out to Skeid. He was also loaned out to Clausenengen in the spring of 1998 before venturing to Greek football and Panionios. He made 16 appearances in the 1998–99 Alpha Ethniki, scoring one goal. Requiring surgery on the cartilage in both his heels, he returned to Norway after one season. He made a brief comeback in Clausenengen and spent time training with Strømsgodset IF in June 2000. He later alleged that his time in Greece had been marred by the wide prevalence of match fixing.

== International career ==
Kruse was capped a total of 6 games for Norway at international youth level.

== Managerial career ==
Kruse was a youth coach in Lyn, then Bækkelaget in 2006 before coaching Bækkelaget's senior team in 2007.
