= David Tufekčić =

Norwegian footballer (born 2004)

Personal information
- Date of birth: 22 January 2004 (age 22)
- Place of birth: Bergen, Norway
- Position: Midfielder

Team information
- Current team: Kristiansund
- Number: 16

Youth career
- –2020: Gneist
- 2021: Fyllingsdalen
- 2022–2023: Brann

Senior career*
Years	Team	Apps	(Gls)
2021	Fyllingsdalen	10	(0)
2022–2024	Brann 2	54	(11)
2023–2024	Brann	1	(0)
2024	→ Kristiansund (loan)	6	(0)
2024–	Kristiansund	39	(5)
- * Club domestic league appearances and goals as of 1 December 2025

David Tufekčić (born 22 January 2004) is a Norwegian footballer who plays as a midfielder for Kristiansund.

== Personal life ==
Tufekčić is of Croatian descent, and is eligible for Norway and Croatia.

== Career ==
He started his youth career in IL Gneist and moved to Fyllingsdalen FK, where he made his senior debut in July 2021. In 2022 he moved on to the youth team of SK Brann. He also played for its senior B team.

Tufekčić made his senior debut in the Eliteserien on 13 May 2023. Brann fielded several inexperienced players during that match, which they lost 2–1. The next month, he signed his first professional contract with SK Brann. He was included in the pre-season training camp of 2024, but he was not close to Brann's starting eleven. In mid-June 2024 he signed for Kristiansund BK on a national youth loan; the Nordmøre club needing a replacement for the injured Franklin Daddys Boy Nyenetue. On 31 August, at the closing of the summer transfer window, the transfer was made permanent.

His first Eliteserien goal came in September 2024, described as an excuisite curl into the upper corner of the net. By the start of the 2025 Eliteserien, Tufekčić was one of Kristiansund's key players. He scored the winning goal as Kristiansund beat Bryne 2–1 in early April. Following his "shush" celebration, he was pelted with a soda bottle.

On 2 May 2026, Tufekčić signed to extend his contract with the club until summer 2029, while his previous deal was due to expire in 2027.
