= Simon Alexandersson =

Swedish footballer

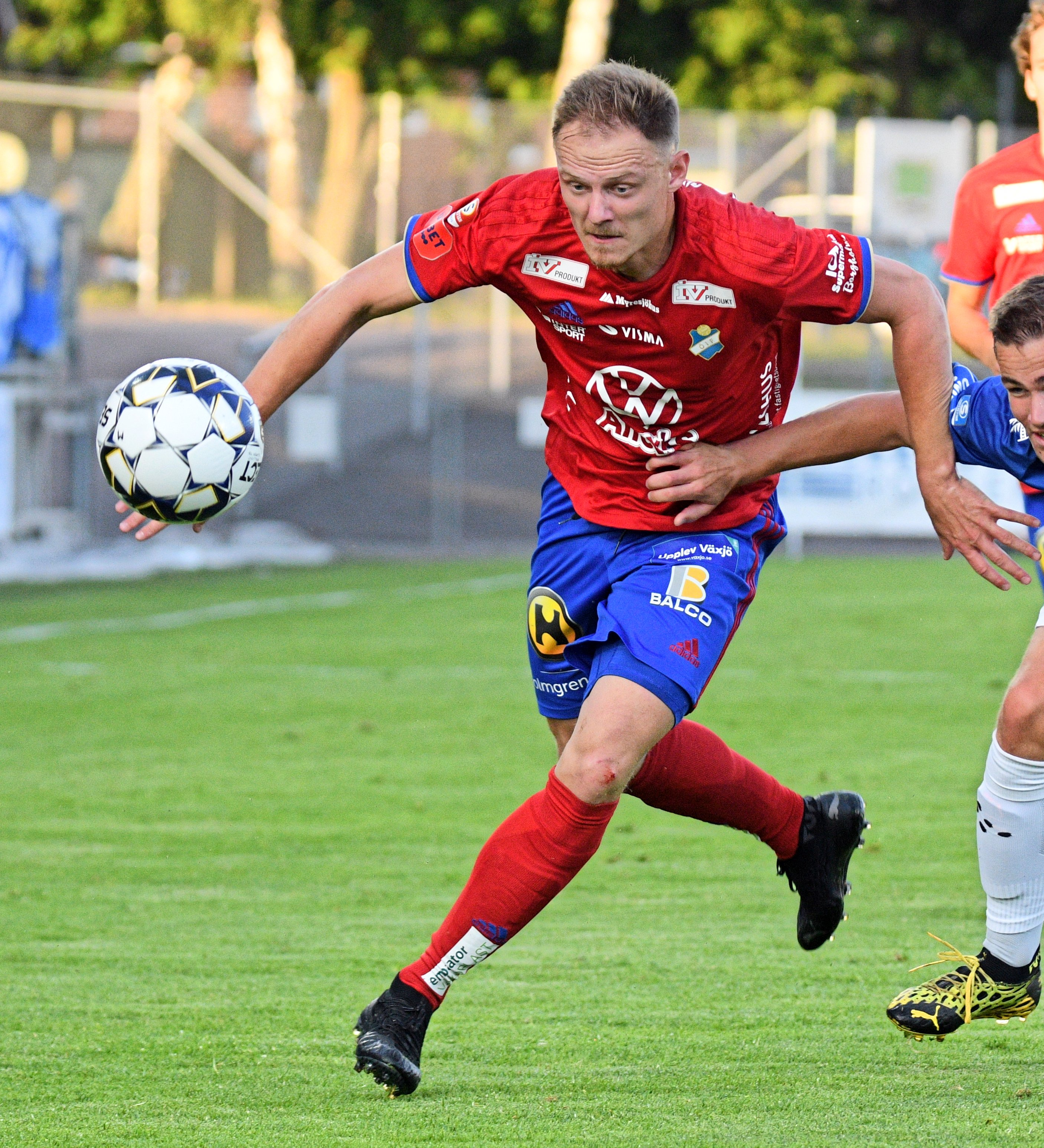

Personal information
- Date of birth: 23 November 1992 (age 33)
- Place of birth: Sweden
- Height: 1.93 m (6 ft 4 in)
- Position: Forward

Senior career*
Years	Team	Apps	(Gls)
2010–2013	Hvetlanda GIF	53	(47)
2013–2014	Harlow Town		
2014–2015	Vimmerby IF	46	(25)
2016–2017	Åtvidabergs FF	28	(9)
2017	AFC Eskilstuna	18	(1)
2018	IK Brage	16	(8)
2018–2020	Kristiansund	11	(0)
2019	→ Dalkurd (loan)	26	(3)
2020–2021	Öster	31	(4)
2021	GAIS	9	(5)
- * Club domestic league appearances and goals as of 21:53, 7 January 2022 (UTC)

Simon Alexandersson (born 23 November 1992) is a Swedish footballer. Alexandersson was recruited by Norwegian club Kristiansund BK in 2018, and was loaned to Dalkurd FF in February 2019. He joined Östers in December 2019.
