= Daouda Bamba =

Ivorian footballer

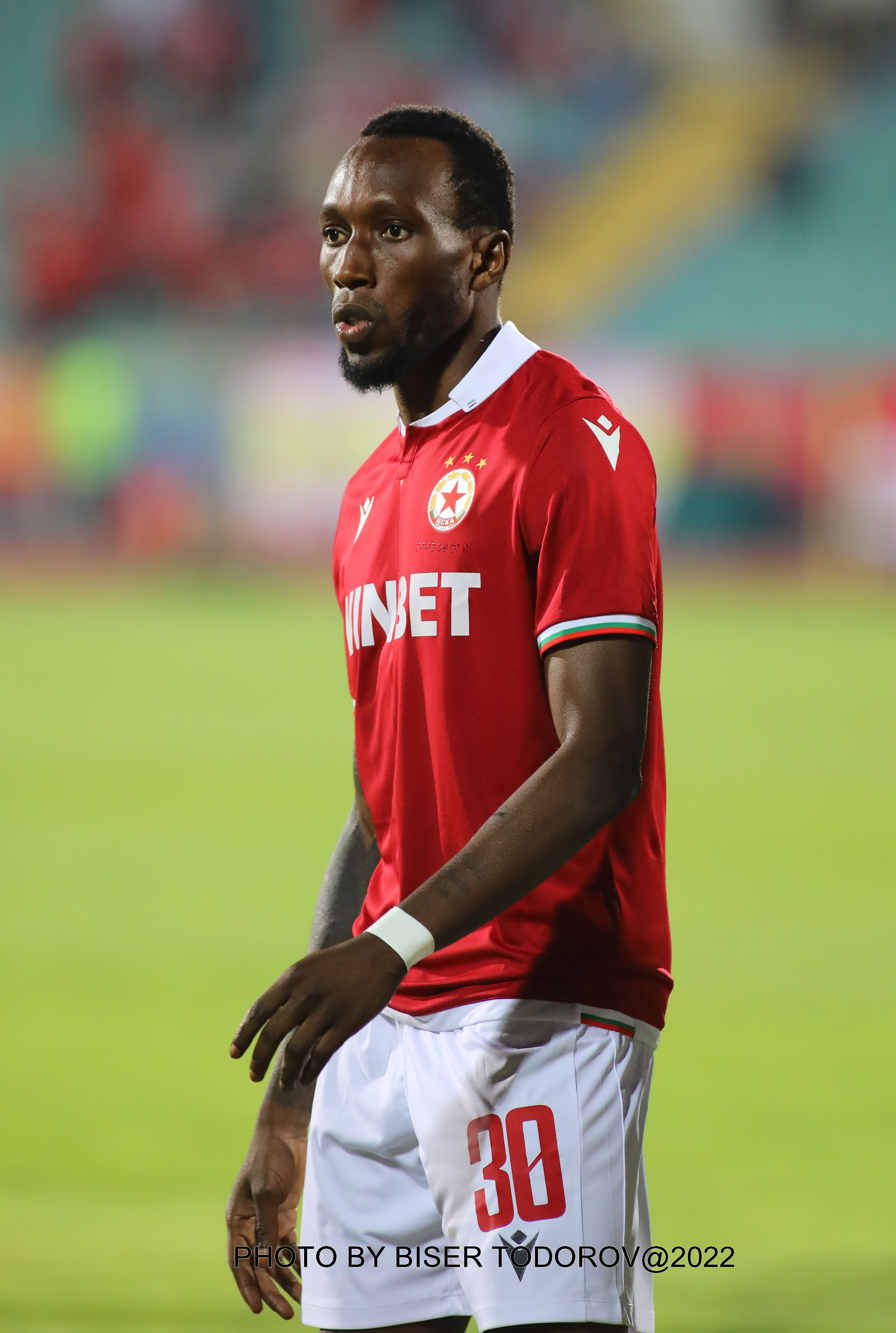

Personal information
- Full name: Daouda Karamoko Bamba
- Date of birth: 5 March 1995 (age 31)
- Place of birth: Dabou, Ivory Coast
- Height: 1.79 m (5 ft 10 in)
- Position: Striker

Team information
- Current team: Arendal
- Number: 28

Senior career*
Years	Team	Apps	(Gls)
2013	Kongsvinger	12	(4)
2014–2018	Kristiansund	105	(43)
2018–2021	Brann	76	(27)
2021–2022	Altay	32	(7)
2022–2023	CSKA Sofia	11	(1)
2023–2024	Ümraniyespor	3	(0)
2024	Shkëndija	2	(0)
2025	Arendal	6	(2)
- * Club domestic league appearances and goals as of 3 November 2025

Daouda Karamoko Bamba (born 5 March 1995) is an Ivorian professional footballer who last played for striker for Norwegian side Arendal.

== Career ==
Born and raised in the Ivory Coast, Bamba began his professional career at Norwegian second-tier side Kongsvinger where he was offered a contract in 2013 after a successful trial period. The 18-year-old Ivorian had a strong debut season, scoring four goals in 12 appearances. The following season he joined Kristiansund where he spent five seasons, and became a crowd favorite. In 2016, he scored 20 goals and helped Kristiansund achieve promotion to Eliteserien for the first time in the club's history.

Bamba scored consistently, and helped Kristiansund survive their debut season in the top flight. In the summer of 2018, he was signed by Brann for a transfer fee reported to be 8,000,000 NOK. His time at Brann was productive in terms of goals, but also marred by controversies. In 2019, he was suspended four games for elbowing Tromsø defender Simen Wangberg in the face. Later that season he was suspended one game by his own club following a training-ground scuffle with teammate Veton Berisha.

In the summer of 2021, Bamba left Norway after almost eight years, when he was signed by Turkish side Altay Izmir. He had a strong first season with the club, scoring seven goals in the Süper Lig, but left the club after only one seasons due to missing wage payments.

== Career statistics ==
=== Club ===
As of match played 25 September 2024

Appearances and goals by club, season and competition
Club	Season	League			National Cup		Europe		Total	
Club	Season	Division	Apps	Goals	Apps	Goals	Apps	Goals	Apps	Goals
Kongsvinger	2013	1. divisjon	12	4	0	0	–		12	4
Kristiansund	2014	1. divisjon	26	4	3	0	–		29	4
Kristiansund	2015	1. divisjon	11	5	0	0	–		11	5
Kristiansund	2016	1. divisjon	28	20	1	1	–		29	21
Kristiansund	2017	Eliteserien	22	7	3	1	–		25	8
Kristiansund	2018	Eliteserien	18	7	3	0	–		21	7
Kristiansund	Total		105	43	10	2	-	-	115	45
Brann	2018	Eliteserien	11	4	0	0	–		11	4
Brann	2019	Eliteserien	21	7	2	0	2	1	25	8
Brann	2020	Eliteserien	30	10	–		–		30	10
Brann	2021	Eliteserien	14	6	1	1	–		15	7
Brann	Total		76	27	3	1	2	1	81	29
Altay	2021–22	Süper Lig	32	7	0	0	–		32	7
CSKA Sofia	2022–23	First League	11	1	0	0	3	0	14	1
Ümraniyespor	2023–24	TFF First League	3	0	0	0	–		3	0
Shkëndija	2024–25	Macedonian First League	2	0	0	0	–		2	0
Career total			238	82	13	3	5	1	256	86
