= Bent Sørmo =

Norwegian footballer (born 1996)

Personal information
- Full name: Bent Langåssve Sørmo
- Date of birth: 22 September 1996 (age 30)
- Place of birth: Levanger Municipality, Norway
- Height: 1.87 m (6 ft 1 1/2 in)
- Position: Right-back

Team information
- Current team: Strømsgodset
- Number: 5

Youth career
- Levanger
- 2014: Rosenborg

Senior career*
Years	Team	Apps	(Gls)
2012–2013	Levanger	23	(5)
2014–2015	Rosenborg	0	(0)
2015	→ Levanger (loan)	12	(0)
2015–2017	Levanger	68	(2)
2018–2021	Kristiansund	87	(2)
2021–2023	Zulte Waregem	18	(0)
2023–	Strømsgodset	67	(1)

International career^{‡}
2013	Norway U17	5	(0)
2014	Norway U18	7	(1)
2014	Norway U19	2	(0)
- * Club domestic league appearances and goals as of 14 November 2026 ‡ National team caps and goals as of 25 August 2014

Bent Sørmo (born 22 September 1996) is a Norwegian footballer who plays as a right-back for Strømsgodset.

== Career ==
Sørmo was born in Levanger Municipality. After impressing in his local club Levanger Sørmo was awarded with a contract by Rosenborg in December 2013. He played his first senior game for Rosenborg when starting the Norwegian Football Cup first-round game versus Orkla.

He rejoined Levanger on loan in 2015, and in the summer that year the loan was made permanent. In December 2017 he signed for Kristiansund.

== Career statistics ==
As of 7 July 2026

Season	Club	Division	League		Cup		Europe		Total	
Season	Club	Division	Apps	Goals	Apps	Goals	Apps	Goals	Apps	Goals
2012	Levanger	2. divisjon	5	2	0	0	–		5	2
2013	Levanger	2. divisjon	18	3	2	0	–		20	3
2014	Rosenborg	Tippeligaen	0	0	0	0	1	0	1	0
2015	Levanger	1. divisjon	24	0	1	0	–		25	0
2016	Levanger	1. divisjon	29	2	1	0	–		30	2
2017	Levanger	1. divisjon	27	0	1	0	–		28	0
2018	Kristiansund	Eliteserien	26	0	3	1	–		29	1
2019	Kristiansund	Eliteserien	26	1	2	0	–		28	1
2020	Kristiansund	Eliteserien	30	1	0	0	–		30	1
2021	Kristiansund	Eliteserien	5	0	0	0	–		5	0
2021–22	Zulte Waregem	Belgian Pro League	10	0	0	0	–		10	0
2022–23	Zulte Waregem	Belgian Pro League	8	0	3	0	–		11	0
2023	Strømsgodset	Eliteserien	10	0	0	0	–		10	0
2024	Strømsgodset	Eliteserien	14	0	0	0	–		14	0
2025	Strømsgodset	Eliteserien	20	0	3	0	–		23	0
2026	Strømsgodset	OBOS-ligaen	11	0	0	0	–		11	0
Career Total			263	9	16	1	1	0	280	10
