= Benjamin Stokke =

Norwegian footballer (born 1990)

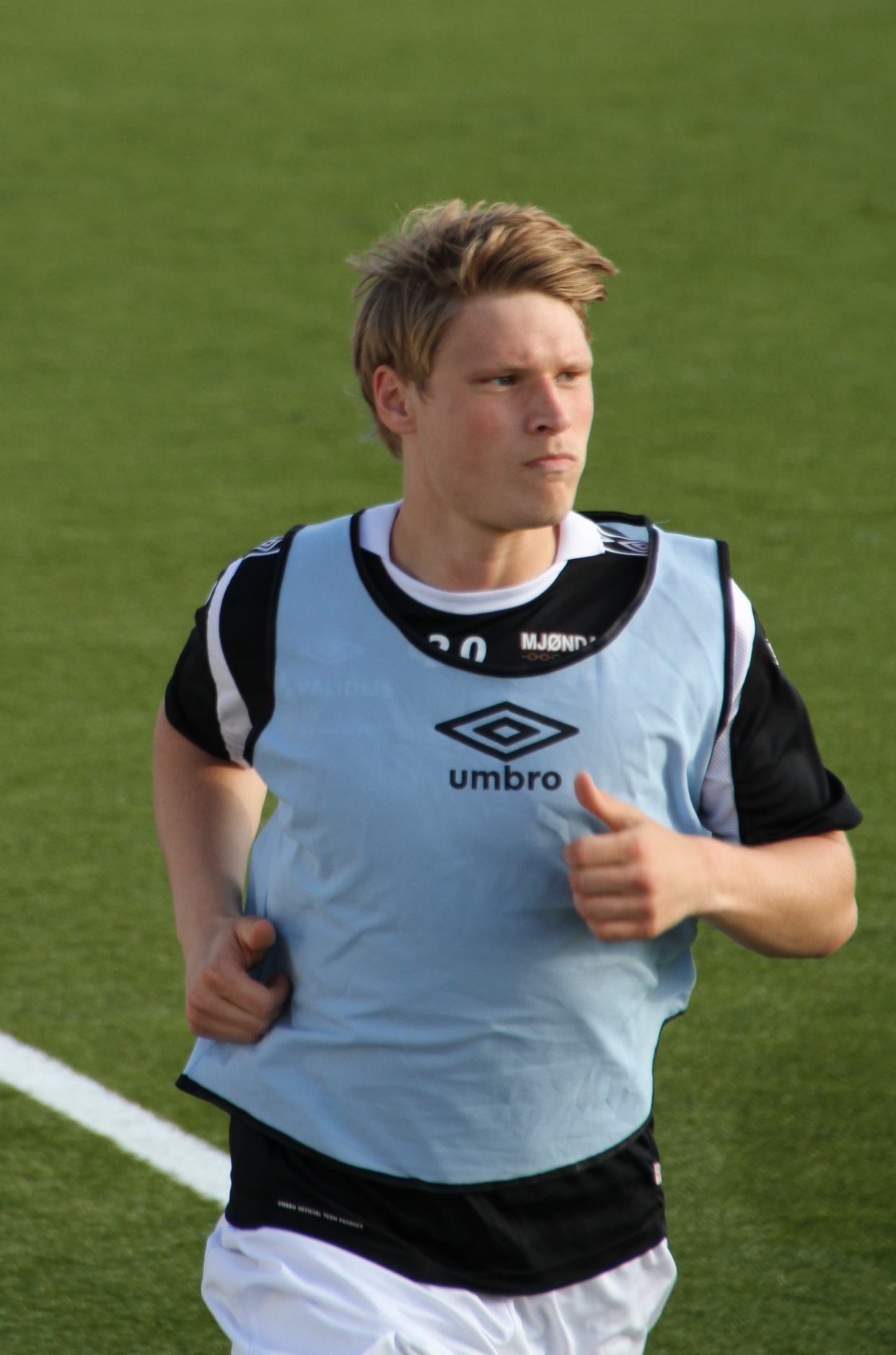
- Stokke in 2012

Personal information
- Date of birth: 20 August 1990 (age 36)
- Place of birth: Oslo, Norway
- Height: 1.91 m (6 ft 3 in)
- Position: Forward

Team information
- Current team: Eik Tønsberg
- Number: 9

Senior career*
Years	Team	Apps	(Gls)
2009–2010	Tønsberg		
2011	Sandefjord	17	(5)
2012–2013	Mjøndalen	40	(6)
2014–2016	Levanger	84	(30)
2017–2018	Kristiansund	42	(11)
2018–2020	Randers	34	(5)
2020	Vålerenga	15	(3)
2021–2022	Mjøndalen	58	(9)
2023	Kristiansund	30	(16)
2024	Breiðablik	23	(4)
2025	Eik Tønsberg	4	(3)
2025	Afturelding	22	(6)
2026–	Eik Tønsberg	14	(7)
- * Club domestic league appearances and goals as of 15 November 2026

Benjamin Stokke (born 20 August 1990) is a Norwegian football player currently playing as a striker for Eik Tønsberg.

== Career statistics ==
=== Club ===
As of match played 15 November 2026

Appearances and goals by club, season and competition
Club	Season	League			National Cup		Continental		Total	
Club	Season	Division	Apps	Goals	Apps	Goals	Apps	Goals	Apps	Goals
Sandefjord	2011	Adeccoligaen	17	5	2	1	-		19	6
Sandefjord	Total		17	5	2	1	-	-	19	6
Mjøndalen	2012	Adeccoligaen	20	4	2	0	-		22	4
Mjøndalen	2013	Adeccoligaen	20	2	2	3	-		22	5
Mjøndalen	Total		40	6	4	3	-	-	44	9
Levanger	2014	Oddsen-ligaen	26	7	2	1	-		28	8
Levanger	2015	OBOS-ligaen	28	9	2	3	-		30	12
Levanger	2016	OBOS-ligaen	30	14	2	2	-		30	16
Levanger	Total		84	30	6	6	-	-	90	36
Kristiansund	2017	Eliteserien	30	10	5	2	-		35	12
Kristiansund	2018	Eliteserien	12	1	3	4	-		15	5
Kristiansund	Total		42	11	8	6	-	-	50	17
Randers	2018–19	Superliga	30	5	0	0	-		30	5
Randers	2019–20	Superliga	4	0	0	0	-		4	0
Randers	Total		34	5	0	0	-	-	34	5
Vålerenga	2020	Eliteserien	15	3	0	0	-		15	3
Vålerenga	Total		15	3	0	0	-	-	15	3
Mjøndalen	2021	Eliteserien	28	4	0	0	-		28	4
Mjøndalen	2022	OBOS-ligaen	30	5	2	0	-		32	5
Mjøndalen	Total		58	9	9	0	-	-	60	9
Kristiansund	2023	OBOS-ligaen	30	16	2	0	-		32	16
Kristiansund	Total		30	16	2	0	-	-	32	16
Breiðablik	2024	Besta deild karla	23	4	1	0	3	0	27	4
Breiðablik	Total		23	4	1	0	3	0	27	4
Eik Tønsberg	2025	PostNord-ligaen	4	3	1	1	-		5	4
Eik Tønsberg	Total		4	3	1	0	-	-	5	4
Afturelding	2025	Besta deild karla	20	6	2	0	-		22	6
Afturelding	Total		20	6	2	0	-	-	22	6
Eik Tønsberg	2026	PostNord-ligaen	14	7	1	0	-		15	7
Eik Tønsberg	Total		14	7	1	0	-	-	15	7
Career total			380	95	28	17	3	0	412	122
