= Bendik Bye =

Norwegian football player (born 1990)

Personal information
- Full name: Bendik Bye
- Date of birth: 9 March 1990 (age 36)
- Place of birth: Steinkjer, Norway
- Height: 1.85 m (6 ft 1 in)
- Position: Forward

Team information
- Current team: Nardo
- Number: 9

Youth career
- –2007: Byafossen

Senior career*
Years	Team	Apps	(Gls)
2007–2011	Steinkjer	104	(51)
2011–2015	Ranheim	95	(13)
2015–2016	Levanger	60	(24)
2017–2018	Sogndal	24	(4)
2018–2022	Kristiansund	132	(34)
2023–2025	Ranheim	81	(22)
2026–	Nardo	2	(0)
- * Club domestic league appearances and goals as of 11 April 2026

Bendik Bye (born 9 March 1990) is a Norwegian football player currently playing as a striker for 3. divisjon club Nardo.

After impressive performances for Steinkjer, Bye signed a contract with Ranheim in 2011. After four seasons with Ranheim, Bye went to Levanger in 2015.

After just two seasons with Levanger, Bye signed a contract with Eliteserien side Sogndal on 3 November 2016. He made his debut in the season opener in April 2017.

== Career statistics ==
=== Club ===
As of match played 11 April 2026

Appearances and goals by club, season and competition
Club	Season	League			National Cup		Continental		Total	
Club	Season	Division	Apps	Goals	Apps	Goals	Apps	Goals	Apps	Goals
Ranheim	2011	1. divisjon	17	1	2	1	-		19	2
Ranheim	2012	1. divisjon	30	5	0	0	-		30	5
Ranheim	2013	1. divisjon	24	3	4	0	-		28	3
Ranheim	2014	1. divisjon	24	4	2	2	-		26	6
Ranheim	Total		95	13	8	3	-	-	103	16
Levanger	2015	1. divisjon	30	15	2	2	-		32	17
Levanger	2016	1. divisjon	30	9	2	1	-		32	10
Levanger	Total		60	24	4	3	-	-	64	27
Sogndal	2017	Eliteserien	24	4	3	1	-		27	5
Sogndal	Total		24	4	3	1	-	-	27	5
Kristiansund	2018	Eliteserien	30	9	3	1	-		33	10
Kristiansund	2019	Eliteserien	23	4	3	2	-		26	6
Kristiansund	2020	Eliteserien	24	6	0	0	-		24	6
Kristiansund	2021	Eliteserien	26	7	1	1	-		27	8
Kristiansund	2022	Eliteserien	29	8	1	0	-		30	8
Kristiansund	Total		132	34	8	4	-	-	140	38
Ranheim	2023	1. divisjon	29	7	1	0	-		30	7
Ranheim	2024	1. divisjon	29	11	0	0	-		29	11
Ranheim	2025	1. divisjon	23	4	3	1	-		26	5
Ranheim	Total		81	22	4	1	-	-	85	23
Nardo	2026	3. divisjon	2	0	0	0	-		2	0
Nardo	Total		2	0	0	0	-	-	2	0
Career total			393	97	27	13	-	-	420	110
