= Pål Erik Ulvestad =

Norwegian footballer (born 1990)

Personal information
- Full name: Pål Erik Stensøe Ulvestad
- Date of birth: 8 September 1990 (age 36)
- Place of birth: Molde, Norway
- Position: Midfielder

Team information
- Current team: Kristiansund
- Number: 23

Youth career
- Herd

Senior career*
Years	Team	Apps	(Gls)
2008-2010	Herd		
2011-2014	Molde	11	(0)
2012	→ Kristiansund (loan)	13	(0)
2013	→ Hønefoss (loan)	7	(0)
2014-2022	Kristiansund	114	(0)
- * Club domestic league appearances and goals as of 20 May 2021

Pål Erik Ulvestad (born 8 September 1990) is a retired Norwegian footballer who played as a midfielder.

== Career ==
Pål Erik Ulvestad is the brother of the former Burnley player Fredrik and Aalesund player Dan Peter Ulvestad, and son of the former footballer Rune Ulvestad. Ulvestad grew up together with his teammate in Molde, Magnus Wolff Eikrem, whose father Knut Hallvard Eikrem was a teammate of Rune Ulvestad at Molde FK in the 80's.

He signed for Molde ahead of the 2011 season, and has a contract with the club until the end of 2014. In his first season, he played nine league-matches and started two of them when Molde won the league.

Due to knee and groin injuries at the end of the 2011 season, Ulvestad missed parts of the pre-season in 2012, and in March he was sent on loan to the Second Division side Kristiansund until 1 August. Manager Ole Gunnar Solskjær said that several second tier clubs wanted Ulvestad on loan, but due to his injuries it would be best to play at the third tier. Ulvestad remained in Kristiansund throughout the season, and won promotion with the club.

== Career statistics ==
As of 20 May 2021

Season	Club	Division	League		Cup		Total	
Season	Club	Division	Apps	Goals	Apps	Goals	Apps	Goals
2011	Molde	Tippeligaen	11	0	5	0	16	0
2012	Kristiansund	2. divisjon	13	0	0	0	13	0
2013	Hønefoss	Tippeligaen	7	0	2	0	9	0
2014	Kristiansund	1. divisjon	8	0	2	0	10	0
2015	Kristiansund	1. divisjon	18	0	3	0	21	0
2016	Kristiansund	1. divisjon	7	0	0	0	7	0
2017	Kristiansund	Eliteserien	24	0	1	0	25	0
2018	Kristiansund	Eliteserien	12	0	1	0	13	0
2019	Kristiansund	Eliteserien	21	0	3	0	24	0
2020	Kristiansund	Eliteserien	21	0	0	0	21	0
2021	Kristiansund	Eliteserien	3	0	0	0	3	0
Career Total			145	0	17	0	162	0
