= Sverre Økland =

Norwegian footballer (born 1993)

Personal information
- Full name: Sverre Hjelle Økland
- Date of birth: 19 June 1993 (age 33)
- Place of birth: Ålesund, Norway
- Height: 1.76 m (5 ft 9 1/2 in)
- Position: Midfielder

Team information
- Current team: Hødd
- Number: 8

Youth career
- Aalesund

Senior career*
Years	Team	Apps	(Gls)
2009–2012	Aalesund	1	(0)
2011	→ Løv-Ham (loan)	2	(0)
2012–2018	Kristiansund	120	(13)
2019–2020	Ullensaker/Kisa	44	(1)
2021–	Hødd	37	(0)

International career
2008	Norway U-15	4	(2)
2009	Norway U-16	5	(0)
2009–2010	Norway U-17	12	(0)
2011	Norway U-18	4	(0)
Medal record
Kristiansund
Winner	OBOS-ligaen	2016
- * Club domestic league appearances and goals as of 6 December 2023

Sverre Hjelle Økland (born 19 June 1993) is a Norwegian footballer who plays as a midfielder for OBOS-ligaen club Hødd. He started his senior career with Aalesund in 2009, moving to Løv-Ham in 2011 for its final season (merged into FK Fyllingsdalen), then moved to Kristiansund BK in July 2012, where he stayed for seven seasons.

== Career statistics ==
As of 18 October 2020

Season	Club	Division	League		Cup		Total	
Season	Club	Division	Apps	Goals	Apps	Goals	Apps	Goals
2009	Aalesund	Tippeligaen	1	0	0	0	1	0
2010	Aalesund	Tippeligaen	0	0	1	0	1	0
2011	Løv-Ham	1. divisjon	2	0	0	0	2	0
2012	Kristiansund	2. divisjon	10	3	0	0	10	3
2013	Kristiansund	1. divisjon	14	1	2	0	16	1
2014	Kristiansund	1. divisjon	23	2	3	1	26	3
2015	Kristiansund	1. divisjon	30	2	4	1	34	3
2016	Kristiansund	1. divisjon	30	3	1	0	31	3
2017	Kristiansund	Eliteserien	13	2	2	0	15	2
2018	Kristiansund	Eliteserien	0	0	0	0	0	0
2019	Ullensaker/Kisa	OBOS-ligaen	23	1	2	1	25	2
2020	Ullensaker/Kisa	OBOS-ligaen	18	0	0	0	18	0
Career Total			164	14	15	3	179	17

== Honours ==
=== Club ===
Kristiansund

- 1. divisjon (1): 2016
