= Conny Månsson =

Swedish footballer

Personal information
- Full name: Bengt Conny Mikael Månsson
- Date of birth: 4 January 1980 (age 46)
- Place of birth: Arboga, Sweden
- Height: 1.88 m (6 ft 2 in)
- Position: Goalkeeper

Senior career*
Years	Team	Apps	(Gls)
2007–2010	Kongsvinger	76	(1)
2011	Mosjøen		
2012–2013	Fløy	49	(0)
2014–2018	Kristiansund	83	(0)
- * Club domestic league appearances and goals as of 24 January 2019

Bengt Conny Mikael Månsson (born 4 January 1980) is a Swedish football player most recently playing as a goalkeeper for Kristiansund.

== Career ==
On 3 January 2019 it was announced, that Kristiansund BK wouldn't extend Månsson's contract, that just expired.

== Career statistics ==
As of 31 July 2017

Club	Season	Division	League		Cup		Total	
Club	Season	Division	Apps	Goals	Apps	Goals	Apps	Goals
2007	Kongsvinger	1. divisjon	30	1	0	0	30	1
2008	Kongsvinger	1. divisjon	19	0	0	0	19	0
2009	Kongsvinger	1. divisjon	27	0	1	0	28	0
2010	Kongsvinger	Tippeligaen	0	0	0	0	0	0
2012	Fløy	2. divisjon	26	0	0	0	26	0
2013	Fløy	2. divisjon	23	0	3	0	26	0
2014	Kristiansund	1. divisjon	21	0	3	0	24	0
2015	Kristiansund	1. divisjon	28	0	3	0	31	0
2016	Kristiansund	1. divisjon	30	0	0	0	30	0
2017	Kristiansund	Eliteserien	1	0	2	0	3	0
Career Total			205	1	12	0	217	1
