= Torgil Øwre Gjertsen =

Norwegian footballer (born 1992)

Personal information
- Full name: Torgil Øwre Gjertsen
- Date of birth: 12 March 1992 (age 34)
- Place of birth: Trondheim, Norway
- Height: 1.75 m (5 ft 9 in)
- Position: Forward

Senior career*
Years	Team	Apps	(Gls)
2011–2013	Strindheim	48	(25)
2014–2017	Ranheim	90	(10)
2017–2019	Kristiansund	64	(13)
2020–2021	Wisła Płock	28	(3)
2021–2023	Kristiansund	89	(10)

International career
2018	Norway (futsal)	4	(1)
- * Club domestic league appearances and goals as of 15 November 2023

Torgil Øwre Gjertsen (born 12 March 1992) is a Norwegian professional footballer who plays as a forward. In 2018, he earned four caps for the Norway national futsal team.

== Career statistics ==
As of 8 February 2024

Club	Season	Division	League		Cup		Total	
Club	Season	Division	Apps	Goals	Apps	Goals	Apps	Goals
Strindheim	2011	2. divisjon	3	0	0	0	3	0
Strindheim	2012	3. divisjon	22	10	2	1	24	11
Strindheim	2013	2. divisjon	23	15	1	0	24	15
Strindheim	Total		48	25	3	1	51	26
Ranheim	2014	1. divisjon	19	1	2	0	21	1
Ranheim	2015	1. divisjon	28	5	1	0	29	5
Ranheim	2016	1. divisjon	27	2	1	0	28	2
Ranheim	2017	1. divisjon	16	2	1	0	17	2
Ranheim	Total		90	10	5	0	95	10
Kristiansund	2017	Eliteserien	12	8	1	0	13	8
Kristiansund	2018	Eliteserien	24	3	1	0	25	3
Kristiansund	2019	Eliteserien	28	2	4	0	32	2
Kristiansund	Total		64	13	6	0	70	13
Wisła Płock	2019–20	Ekstraklasa	9	2	0	0	9	2
Wisła Płock	2020–21	Ekstraklasa	19	1	2	0	21	1
Wisła Płock	Total		28	3	2	0	30	3
Kristiansund	2021	Eliteserien	29	6	3	2	32	8
Kristiansund	2022	Eliteserien	30	1	1	0	31	1
Kristiansund	2023	OBOS-ligaen	30	3	2	0	32	3
Kristiansund	2024	Eliteserien	0	0	0	0	0	0
Kristiansund	Total		89	10	6	2	95	12
Career Total			319	61	22	3	341	64
