= Kristiansund BK =

Norwegian football club

Kristiansund
- Full name: Kristiansund Ballklubb
- Nickname: Uglan (The Owls)
- Short name: KBK
- Founded: 2 September 2003; 23 years ago
- Ground: Kristiansund Stadion
- Capacity: 4,444
- Chairman: Vidar Solli
- Head coach: Amund Skiri
- League: Eliteserien
- 2025: Eliteserien, 13th of 16
- Website: www.kristiansundbk.no
Home colours	Away colours	Third colours

Kristiansund BK is a Norwegian professional football club located in Kristiansund that currently plays in Eliteserien. The team plays its home matches in the 4,444-capacity Kristiansund Stadion.

Kristiansund BK was formed in the autumn of 2003, when two rival clubs of Kristiansund, Kristiansund FK and Clausenengen FK, agreed to establish a new elite team.

== History ==
=== Background ===
Since Magnar Isaksen won a bronze medal in the 1936 Summer Olympics, many footballers from Kristiansund have played for the Norwegian national team, including Ole Gunnar Solskjær, Øyvind Leonhardsen, Trond Andersen, Ole Stavrum and Georg Hammer. In addition, players like Ola Lyngvær, Jan Erlend Kruse, Arild Stavrum, Ole Erik Stavrum, André Flem and Christian Michelsen have played for different clubs in the Norwegian top division, and Clausenengen has been called a "talent factory". Nevertheless, the football clubs from Kristiansund have had limited success, with Kristiansund FK's spell in the 1. divisjon in 1991 and Clausenengen in 1999 as the most recent.

=== 2003–2004: Founding and development ===
In 2003, the local bank Sparebank 1 Nordvest initiated a merge between Kristiansund FK and Clausenengen, with the bank as the main sponsor of the new club paying 750,000 kr per year. Kristiansund BK was founded on 2 September 2003 and replaced Kristiansund FK in the 3. divisjon, with the other two clubs continuing to play in the lower divisions. Atlanten Stadion was chosen as the club's first home ground and Erik Brakstad was appointed as the club's first head coach.

The club finished their 2004 debut season in second place behind Træff in their 3. divisjon group 18.

=== 2005–2016: Promotions ===
In 2005, Kristiansund won promotion to the 2. divisjon after beating Volda in the 4–2 win on aggregate in the promotion play-offs. Brakstad left his position as head coach after the promotion and Ole Gunnar Iversen took over. In 2006, Kristiansund finished seventh in their first season in the 2. divisjon. In 2007, Kristiansund moved to Omsundet at Frei Municipality due to the poor turf conditions at Atlanten Stadion. Ahead of the 2007 season, Geir Midtsian replaced Ole Gunnar Iversen as head coach and with New Zealand international Kris Bright on the team, who scored 23 goals in 26 matches for the club, Kristiansund BK started to look like a contender for promotion and finished fifth in 2007 and fourth in 2008. The team also eliminated Rosenborg in the second round of the 2008 Norwegian Football Cup.

After finishing third in 2009, the club's goal was promotion to the 1. divisjon, and in March 2010 Kristiansund BK and Surnadal IL started a partnership with Molde FK for developing local players. In August 2010 Molde FK loaned out Elias Valderhaug and Jacob Falch Meidell to Kristiansund BK to help out in the race for promotion, but the team finished second behind Hødd. After suffering bad results in the beginning of the 2011 season, Midtsian decided to withdraw as head coach in July 2011, while his assistants Per Eirik Bentz and Torgeir Fredly were left in charge until the club hired a new head coach. From July 2011, Erling Moe took charge of the team in the second half of the season and the team's results improved, leading to a second-place finish behind Bærum.

On 10 November 2011, Kristiansund BK announced that they had hired Geir Bakke, who had previously worked as assistant coach at the first-tier clubs Vålerenga and Stabæk, as head coach starting from 1 January 2012. After playing 21 matches without losing, the club was promoted to the 1. divisjon on 16 September 2012, as winners of their 2012 2. divisjon group. Christian Michelsen succeeded Bakke as head coach in 2014. The club moved to Kristiansund Stadion in 2014 after several years playing at Idrettsplassen. After making the play-offs rounds in the 2014 and 2015 seasons of the 1. divisjon, Kristiansund BK were promoted to Eliteserien after finishing in first place in 2016.

=== 2017–present : First Eliteserien seasons ===
Kristiansund began their spell in the top division with a surprising seventh-place finish in their debut season. The team also reached the quarter-finals of the 2017 Norwegian Football Cup, the first time in club history they played the quarter-finals stage, where they were eliminated by local rivals Molde on away ground. The 2018 Eliteserien saw Kristiansund record their best ever league achievement: A fifth place with 46 points.

== Recent seasons ==
Season	Division	Pos.	Pl.	W	D	L	GS	GA	Pts.	Cup	Notes
2010	2. divisjon (gr. 2)	2	26	17	4	5	60	35	55	Second round	
2011	2. divisjon (gr. 2)	2	24	15	3	6	55	29	48	Second round	
2012	2. divisjon (gr. 2)	↑ 1	26	22	2	2	77	18	68	Second round	Promoted
2013	1. divisjon	9	30	12	6	12	47	44	42	Second round	
2014	1. divisjon	4	30	13	10	7	53	39	49	Third round	
2015	1. divisjon	3	30	14	7	9	37	30	49	Fourth round	
2016	1. divisjon	↑ 1	30	19	5	6	47	30	62	First round	Promoted
2017	Eliteserien	7	30	10	10	10	44	46	40	Quarter-final	
2018	Eliteserien	5	30	13	7	10	46	41	46	Third round	
2019	Eliteserien	6	30	11	8	11	41	41	41	Fourth round	
2020	Eliteserien	5	30	12	12	6	57	45	48	Cancelled	
2021	Eliteserien	6	30	14	4	12	41	46	46	Third round	
2022	Eliteserien	↓ 15	30	5	8	17	37	60	23	Third round	Relegated
2023	1. divisjon	↑ 4	30	14	8	8	56	38	50	Third round	Promoted
2024	Eliteserien	11	30	8	10	12	32	45	34	Third round	
2025	Eliteserien	13	30	9	7	14	34	59	34	Semi-final	
2026 (in progress)	Eliteserien	14	26	7	5	14	30	51	26	Third round	

== Players ==
=== Current squad ===
As of 3 September 2026

Note: Flags indicate national team as defined under FIFA eligibility rules; some limited exceptions apply. Players may hold more than one non-FIFA nationality.

No.	Pos.	Nation	Player
1	GK	USA	Michael Lansing
2	DF	NOR	Anders Børset
3	DF	DEN	Frederik Flex
4	DF	ISL	Júlíus Mar Júlíusson
5	DF	NOR	Dan Peter Ulvestad (captain)
6	MF	NOR	Jesper Isaksen
7	FW	NOR	Sander Svendsen
8	MF	NOR	Eron Isufi (on loan from Lyn)
10	MF	NOR	Heine Gikling Bruseth
11	FW	KOS	Zymer Bytyqi
12	GK	NOR	Adrian Sæther
14	MF	NOR	Syver Skeide (on loan from Bodø/Glimt)

No.	Pos.	Nation	Player
16	FW	NOR	David Tufekcic
17	DF	NOR	Max Normann Williamsen
19	FW	NOR	Leander Alvheim
20	MF	NGR	Wilfred George Igor
22	DF	NOR	Haakon Haugen
23	MF	NOR	Tobias Svendsen
24	DF	DEN	Gustav Christensen (on loan from Hertha BSC)
25	DF	NOR	John Kitolano
27	MF	NOR	Adrian Kurd Rønning
35	DF	NOR	Isak Hagen Aalberg
38	DF	NOR	Aksel Brattøy
59	DF	DEN	Marius Elvius

For season transfers, see List of Norwegian football transfers winter 2025–26, and List of Norwegian football transfers summer 2026.

=== Out on loan ===
Note: Flags indicate national team as defined under FIFA eligibility rules; some limited exceptions apply. Players may hold more than one non-FIFA nationality.

No.	Pos.	Nation	Player
31	MF	NOR	Herman Sjåvik Opsahl (at Træff until 31 December 2026)
40	GK	NOR	Sander Rød (at Follo until 31 December 2026)

No.	Pos.	Nation	Player
—	DF	DEN	Noah Ibsen (at Moss until 31 December 2026)

== History of head coaches ==
Kristiansund BK head coaches from 2003 to present
- (Norway) Erik Brakstad (17 November 2003 – October 2005)
- (Norway) Ole Gunnar Iversen (January 2006 – October 2006)
- (Norway) Geir Midtsian (October 2006 – 18 July 2011)
- (Norway) Erling Moe (25 July 2011 – October 2011)
- (Norway) Geir Bakke (1 January 2012 – November 2013)
- (Norway) Christian Michelsen (1 January 2014 – 25 August 2023)
- (Norway) Amund Skiri (26 August 2023 – present)

== History of league positions ==
	2004– 2005	2006– 2012	2013– 2016	2017– 2022	2023	2024–
Level 1						
Level 2						
Level 3						
Level 4						
