= 2020 Odds BK season =

Odd
2020 season
- President: Trond Haukvik
- Manager: Jan Frode Nornes
- Stadium: Skagerak Arena
- Eliteserien: 7th
- Norwegian Cup: Canceled due to the COVID-19 pandemic
- Top goalscorer: League: Mushaga Bakenga (15); All: Mushaga Bakenga (15)
Home colours	Away colours

The 2020 season was Odd's twelfth continuous season in the Eliteserien since winning the 1. divisjon in 2008.

== Season events ==
On 31 January, Dag-Eilev Fagermo left to become manager of Vålerenga, with Jan Frode Nornes being appointed as his replacement on 11 March 2020.

On 12 June, the Norwegian Football Federation announced that a maximum of 200 home fans would be allowed to attend the upcoming seasons matches.

On 10 September, the Norwegian Football Federation cancelled the 2020 Norwegian Cup due to the COVID-19 pandemic in Norway.

On 30 September, the Minister of Culture and Gender Equality, Abid Raja, announced that clubs would be able to have crowds of 600 at games from 12 October.

On 14 October, Odds match against Viking was postponed due to the Viking squad having to isolate after Veton Berisha tested positive for COVID-19, eventually being rearranged for 4 November.

On 28 November, Odds matches against Sandefjord on 29 November, and Strømsgodset on 2 December where postponed due to a positive COVID-19 case within the Odd squad and the whole squad having to quarantine.

== Squad ==
Note: Flags indicate national team as defined under FIFA eligibility rules; some limited exceptions apply. Players may hold more than one non-FIFA nationality.

No.	Pos.	Nation	Player
1	GK	NOR	Sondre Rossbach
2	DF	NOR	Espen Ruud
3	DF	NOR	Fredrik Semb Berge
5	DF	NOR	John Kitolano (on loan from Wolverhampton Wanderers)
6	MF	NOR	Vebjørn Hoff
7	MF	MNE	Vladimir Rodić (on loan from Hammarby)
8	MF	NOR	Markus Andreas Kaasa
9	FW	NOR	Mushaga Bakenga
10	FW	NGA	Kachi
11	FW	KOS	Elbasan Rashani
12	GK	NOR	Egil Selvik
13	DF	NOR	Kevin Egell-Johnsen

No.	Pos.	Nation	Player
14	MF	NOR	Fredrik Nordkvelle
15	DF	NOR	Eirik Asante
16	MF	NOR	Joshua Kitolano
17	MF	NOR	Elias Skogvoll
18	DF	NOR	Odin Bjørtuft
20	FW	NOR	Tobias Lauritsen
21	DF	NOR	Steffen Hagen (Captain)
23	MF	NOR	Marius Larsen
24	DF	NOR	Bjørn Mæland
25	DF	NOR	Tobias Hallstensen
26	MF	NOR	Filip Jørgensen

== Transfers ==
=== In ===
Date	Position	Nationality	Name	From	Fee	Ref.
1 January 2020	MF	(Norway)	Elias Skogvoll	Mjølner	Free	
1 January 2020	FW	(Nigeria)	Kachi	Sandnes Ulf	Free	
23 January 2020	DF	(Norway)	Tobias Hallstensen	Florø	Undisclosed	
29 June 2020	FW	(Norway)	Mushaga Bakenga	Tromsø	Free	
29 August 2020	FW	(Sweden)	Robin Simović	Livorno	Undisclosed	

=== Loans in ===
Date from	Position	Nationality	Name	to	Date to	Ref.
30 June 2020	MF	(Denmark)	Kasper Lunding	AGF Aarhus	5 October	
5 October 2020	DF	(Norway)	John Kitolano	Wolverhampton Wanderers	End of season	
5 October 2020	MF	(Montenegro)	Vladimir Rodić	Hammarby	End of season	

=== Out ===
Date	Position	Nationality	Name	To	Fee	Ref.
3 January 2020	MF	(Norway)	André Sødlund	Sandnes Ulf	Undisclosed	
31 January 2020	MF	(Norway)	Filip Delaveris	SBV Vitesse	Undisclosed	
30 June 2020	FW	(Norway)	Torgeir Børven	Rosenborg	Undisclosed	
5 October 2020	DF	(Norway)	Birk Risa	Molde	Undisclosed	
5 October 2020	MF	(Norway)	Bilal Njie	KFUM Oslo	Undisclosed	

=== Released ===
Date	Position	Nationality	Name	Joined	Date
31 December 2019	MF	(Norway)	Jone Samuelsen		

== Competitions ==
=== Eliteserien ===
==== Results summary ====
Overall								Home						Away					
Pld	W	D	L	GF	GA	GD	Pts	W	D	L	GF	GA	GD	W	D	L	GF	GA	GD
30	13	4	13	52	51	+1	43	8	2	5	28	22	+6	5	2	8	24	29	−5

Last updated: 22 December 2020.
Source: Results

==== Results by round ====
Round	1	2	3	4	5	6	7	8	9	10	11	12	13	14	15	16	17	18	19	20	21	22	23	24	25	26	27	28	29	30
Ground	H	A	H	A	H	H	A	H	A	H	A	H	A	H	A	H	A	H	A	A	A	H	H	A	H	A	A	H	H	A
Result	L	L	W	W	L	D	W	W	L	W	W	W	W	W	L	W	L	W	D	L	W	D	W	L	L	L	D	L	L	L
Position	13	12	10	7	10	11	8	4	7	4	3	3	3	3	3	3	3	3	3	5	5	5	4	5	5	7	7	7	7	7

Updated to match(es) played on 22 December 2020. Source: Results
A = Away; H = Home; W = Win; D = Draw; L = Loss

==== Results ====
16 June 2020 1	Odd	1–2	Sandefjord	Skien
18:00 CEST (UTC+2)	Ruud (yellow card) 31'; Børven 90+3' (pen.)	Report	Jónsson (yellow card) 32'; Pálsson (yellow card) 68'; Nordkvelle 83' (o.g.); Gussiås 90+1'	Stadium: Skagerak Arena; Attendance: 200; Referee: Ola Hobber Nilsen

21 June 2020 2	Strømsgodset	1–0	Odd	Drammen
18:00 CEST (UTC+2)	Hove 2'; Leifsson (yellow card) 25'; Mickelson (yellow card) 62'; Salvesen (yellow card) 82'	Report	Risa (yellow card) 90+3'	Stadium: Marienlyst Stadion; Attendance: 200; Referee: Tore Hansen

24 June 2020 3	Odd	4–1	Vålerenga	Skien
20:30 CEST (UTC+2)	Hoff 12'; Kachi (yellow card) 20'; Børven 60', 67' (pen.), 90+2'; Rashani (yellow card) 85'	Report	Vilhjálmsson 6' (pen.); Adekugbe (yellow card) 37'; Lekven (yellow card) 67'; Myhre (yellow card) 69'	Stadium: Skagerak Arena; Attendance: 200; Referee: Svein Oddvar Moen

27 June 2020 4	IK Start	0–5	Odd	Kristiansand
18:00 CEST (UTC+2)	Afeez (yellow card) 14'; Wichne (yellow card) 50'	Report	Kaasa 4'; Hoff 12'; Børven 49' (pen.), 66'; Ruud (yellow card) 60'; Lauritsen 85'	Stadium: Sør Arena; Attendance: 200; Referee: Sigurd Smehus Kringstad

1 July 2020 5	Odd	0–4	Bodø/Glimt	Skien
18:00 CEST (UTC+2)	Ruud (red card) 15'	Report	Zinckernagel 16' (pen.); Junker 26'; Høibråten 47' (yellow card) 69'; Skytte 66'	Stadium: Skagerak Arena; Attendance: 200; Referee: Marius Hansen Grøtta

5 July 2020 6	Odd	0–0	Haugesund	Skien
18:00 CEST (UTC+2)		Report	Velde (yellow card) 84'	Stadium: Skagerak Arena; Attendance: 200; Referee: Rohit Saggi

12 July 2020 7	Viking	1–2	Odd	Stavanger
18:00 CEST (UTC+2)	Vevatne 61'	Report	Lauritsen 17'; Lunding (yellow card) 87'; Jakobsen 90+2'	Stadium: Viking Stadion; Attendance: 200; Referee: Tommy Skjerven

15 July 2020 8	Odd	1–0	Brann	Skien
20:30 CEST (UTC+2)	Kaasa 53'; Lunding (yellow card) 77'	Report	Ordagić (yellow card) 64'; Hustad (yellow card) 85'	Stadium: Skagerak Arena; Attendance: 200; Referee: Mohammad Aslam

19 July 2020 9	Sarpsborg 08	2–0	Odd	Sarpsborg
18:00 CEST (UTC+2)	Coulibaly 61'; Lindseth (yellow card) 77'; Ofkir 87'	Report	Ruud (yellow card) 90+4'	Stadium: Sarpsborg Stadion; Attendance: 200; Referee: Espen Eskås

25 July 2020 10	Odd	3–2	Aalesund	Skien
18:00 CEST (UTC+2)	Lauritsen 11' (pen.); Kitolano (yellow card) 16'; Ruud (penalty missed) 30' 37'; Rashani (yellow card) 68'; Hoff (yellow card) 89'; Friðjónsson 90' (o.g.)	Report	Grétarsson (yellow card) 10'; Nordli 18' (yellow card) 74'; Ólafsson (yellow card) 21' (yellow-red card) 22'; Bizoza 43'; Kongshavn (yellow card) 79'; A.Lie (yellow card) 80'	Stadium: Skagerak Arena; Attendance: 200; Referee: Kai Erik Steen

29 July 2020 11	Mjøndalen	0–2	Odd	Mjøndalen
18:00 CEST (UTC+2)	Hansen (red card) 34'	Report	Kitolano 42', 87'	Stadium: Consto Arena; Attendance: 200; Referee: Tore Hansen

2 August 2020 12	Odd	2–1	Rosenborg	Skien
20:30 CEST (UTC+2)	Lunding 28'; Dahl Reitan 55' (o.g.)	Report	Hovland (yellow card) 36'; Helland (yellow card) 46'; Holse 67'	Stadium: Skagerak Arena; Attendance: 200; Referee: Tommy Skjerven

9 August 2020 13	Stabæk	0–1	Odd	Bærum
18:00 CEST (UTC+2)		Report	Kaasa (yellow card) 52'; Bakenga 69'; Rossbach (yellow card) 90+3'	Stadium: Nadderud Stadion; Attendance: 200; Referee: Rohit Saggi

16 August 2020 14	Odd	2–1	Kristiansund	Skien
18:00 CEST (UTC+2)	Lunding 20'; Bakenga 37'	Report	Pellegrino 17' (pen.); Kalludra (yellow card) 45+3'; Diagné (yellow card) 90+4'	Stadium: Skagerak Arena; Attendance: 200; Referee: Espen Eskås

22 August 2020 15	Molde	2–0	Odd	Molde
15:00 CEST (UTC+2)	Eikrem (yellow card) 61'; James 77' (pen.) (yellow card) 77'; Pedersen 90+4'	Report	Rashani (yellow card) 39'	Stadium: Aker Stadion; Attendance: 200; Referee: Sivert Amland

30 August 2020 16	Odd	6–1	Mjøndalen	Skien
18:00 CEST (UTC+2)	Ruud 6', 31' (pen.); Bakenga 14', 34'; Rashani 67'; Risa (yellow card) 77' (goal) 90+3'	Report	Brochmann 4'; Solberg (yellow card) 31'; Liseth (penalty missed) 72'; Ovenstad (yellow card) 86'	Stadium: Skagerak Arena; Attendance: 200; Referee: Kristoffer Hagenes

13 September 2020 17	Bodø/Glimt	6–1	Odd	Bodø
18:00 CEST (UTC+2)	Lode (yellow card) 12'; Rossbach 14' (o.g.); Fet (yellow card) 21'; J.Hauge 26' (pen.), 42' (pen.); Saltnes 31', 58'; Boniface 56'	Report	Lunding 1'; Risa (yellow card) 55'	Stadium: Aspmyra Stadion; Attendance: 200; Referee: Kai Erik Steen

20 September 2020 18	Odd	2–0	Stabæk	Skien
20:30 CEST (UTC+2)	Rashani 27'; Ruud 77'	Report		Stadium: Skagerak Arena; Attendance: 200; Referee: Tom Harald Hagen

27 September 2020 19	Haugesund	4–4	Odd	Haugesund
18:00 CEST (UTC+2)	Fredriksen 5'; Wadji (yellow card) 23'; Leite (yellow card) 34'; Hansen (yellow card) 51'; Sandvik (yellow card) 71'; Kitolano 87' (o.g.); Koné 90'; Ammitzbøll 90+3'	Report	Hoff (yellow card) 36'; Simović 43'; Bakenga 45+1', 71'; Kitolano (yellow card) 45+3'; Ruud 62'	Stadium: Haugesund Stadion; Attendance: 200; Referee: Sigurd Smehus Kringstad

4 October 2020 20	Rosenborg	4–1	Odd	Trondheim
20:30 CEST (UTC+2)	Reitan 42'; Tagseth (yellow card) 65'; Zachariassen 70'; Islamović 78', 83' (pen.)	Report	Ruud (yellow card) 19'; Simović 74'	Stadium: Lerkendal Stadion; Attendance: 200; Referee: Espen Andreas Eskås

25 October 2020 22	Aalesunds	0–3	Odd	Ålesund
18:00 CET (UTC+1)	Uzochukwu (yellow card) 36'; Haugen (yellow card) 67'; Jørgensen (yellow card) 86'	Report	Rodić (yellow card) 10'; Jos.Kitolano (yellow card) 27'; Bjørtuft 45+2'; Egell-Johnsen 64'; Bakenga 84'	Stadium: Color Line Stadion; Attendance: 600; Referee: Kai Erik Steen

31 October 2020 23	Odd	1–1	Sarpsborg 08	Skien
18:00 CET (UTC+1)	Ruud 50' (pen.)	Report	Thomassen (yellow card) 32'; Ødegaard (yellow card) 49'; Salétros (yellow card) 57'; Dyrestam 65'	Stadium: Skagerak Arena; Attendance: 600; Referee: Dag Vidar Hafsås

4 November 2020 21	Odd	3–0	Viking	Skien
19:00 CET (UTC+1)	Bakenga 18', 51'; Jos.Kitolano 58'; Rodić (yellow card) 66'	Report	Bell (yellow card) 49'; Vikstøl (yellow card) 54'	Stadium: Skagerak Arena; Attendance: 600; Referee: Sigurd Smehus Kringstad
Note: Match originally scheduled for 18 October but postponed on 14 October due to the COVID-19 pandemic.

8 November 2020 24	Vålerenga	2–0	Odd	Oslo
20:30 CET (UTC+1)	Shala 39'; Vilhjálmsson 86'	Report	Bjørtuft (yellow card) 63'; Joh.Kitolano (yellow card) 86'; Ruud (yellow card) 88'	Stadium: Intility Arena; Attendance: 200; Referee: Rohit Saggi

22 November 2020 25	Odd	1–2	Start	Skien
18:00 CET (UTC+1)	Jos.Kitolano 64'; Hoff (yellow card) 90+3'	Report	Schulze 51'; Deumeland (yellow card) 64'; Kabran 82'; Ramsland (yellow card) 90+3'; El Makrini (yellow card) 90+3'	Stadium: Skagerak Arena; Attendance: 600; Referee: Ola Hobber Nilsen

9 December 2020 28	Kristiansund	4–3	Odd	Kristiansund
18:00 CET (UTC+1)	Hopmark (yellow card) 12'; Sørli 45', 57'; Skarsem (yellow card) 61'; Pellegrino 75', 90+3'; Moumbagna (yellow card) 90+8'	Report	Bakenga 43', 81', 90+1'	Stadium: Kristiansund Stadion; Attendance: 600; Referee: Kai Erik Steen

13 December 2020 26	Sandefjord	1–1	Odd	Sandefjord
18:00 CET (UTC+1)	Pálsson (yellow card) 44'; Vales 84'	Report	Bakenga (yellow card) 18' (goal) 54'; Ruud (penalty missed) 49'; Bjørtuft (yellow card) 90'	Stadium: Sandefjord Arena; Attendance: 600; Referee: Marius Hansen Grøtta
Note: Match originally scheduled for 29 November, but postponed on 28 November due to the COVID-19 pandemic.

16 December 2020 29	Odd	1–4	Molde	Skien
18:00 CET (UTC+1)	Bakenga 9'	Report	Wingo (yellow card) 28'; Gregersen (yellow card) 37'; Christensen (yellow card) 55'; Eikrem 71'; Omoijuanfo 78', 90+5' (pen.); Bolly 83'	Stadium: Skagerak Arena; Attendance: 350; Referee: Ola Hobber Nilsen

19 December 2020 27	Odd	1–3	Strømsgodset	Skien
18:00 CET (UTC+1)	Rashani 20'; Rodić (yellow card) 39'; Joh.Kitolano (yellow card) 52'; Kaasa (yellow card) 58'	Report	Salvesen 9', 53', 66'; Gunnarsson (yellow card) 31'	Stadium: Skagerak Arena; Attendance: 300; Referee: Tom Harald Hagen
Note: Match originally scheduled for 2 December, but postponed on 28 November due to the COVID-19 pandemic.

22 December 2020 30	Brann	2–1	Odd	Bergen
18:00 CET (UTC+1)	Taylor 45+4' (pen.); Forren (yellow card) 54'; Tveita 71'	Report	Jørgensen (yellow card) 45+4'; Bakenga 65'; Lauritsen (yellow card) 69'	Stadium: Brann Stadion; Attendance: 600; Referee: Espen Eskås

==== Table ====
Pos	Team	Pld	W	D	L	GF	GA	GD	Pts
5	Kristiansund	30	12	12	6	57	45	+12	48
6	Viking	30	12	8	10	54	52	+2	44
7	Odd	30	13	4	13	52	51	+1	43
8	Stabæk	30	9	12	9	41	45	−4	39
9	Haugesund	30	11	6	13	39	51	−12	39

Source: Football Association of Norway (in Norwegian)
Rules for classification: 1) Points; 2) Goal difference; 3) Goals scored; 4) Head-to-head points; 5) Head-to-head goal difference; 6) Head-to-head away goals scored (only if between two teams); 7) Head-to-head goals scored; 8) Play-off (only used to decide champions or relegation).

=== Norwegian Cup ===
2020 First round	–
CEST (UTC+2)
Note: Cup cancelled on 10 September due to the COVID-19 pandemic in Norway.

== Squad statistics ==
As of match played 22 December 2020

=== Appearances and goals ===
No.	Pos	Nat	Player	Total		Eliteserien		Norwegian Cup	
No.	Pos	Nat	Player	Apps	Goals	Apps	Goals	Apps	Goals
1	GK	(Norway) NOR	Sondre Rossbach	29	0	29	0	0	0
2	DF	(Norway) NOR	Espen Ruud	27	6	27	6	0	0
5	DF	(Norway) NOR	John Kitolano	8	0	8	0	0	0
6	MF	(Norway) NOR	Vebjørn Hoff	27	2	27	2	0	0
7	MF	(Montenegro) MNE	Vladimir Rodić	13	0	12+1	0	0	0
8	MF	(Norway) NOR	Markus Kaasa	29	2	28+1	2	0	0
9	FW	(Norway) NOR	Mushaga Bakenga	26	15	19+7	15	0	0
10	FW	(Nigeria) NGA	Kachi	22	0	5+17	0	0	0
11	FW	(Kosovo) KOS	Elbasan Rashani	24	3	22+2	3	0	0
12	GK	(Norway) NOR	Egil Selvik	1	0	1	0	0	0
13	DF	(Norway) NOR	Kevin Egell-Johnsen	5	1	3+2	1	0	0
14	MF	(Norway) NOR	Fredrik Nordkvelle	24	0	5+19	0	0	0
15	DF	(Norway) NOR	Eirik Asante	2	0	0+2	0	0	0
16	MF	(Norway) NOR	Joshua Kitolano	27	4	27	4	0	0
17	MF	(Norway) NOR	Elias Skogvoll	3	0	0+3	0	0	0
18	DF	(Norway) NOR	Odin Bjørtuft	30	1	30	1	0	0
19	MF	(Norway) NOR	Bilal Njie	10	0	2+8	0	0	0
20	FW	(Norway) NOR	Tobias Lauritsen	20	3	8+12	3	0	0
21	DF	(Norway) NOR	Steffen Hagen	24	0	24	0	0	0
22	FW	(Sweden) SWE	Robin Simović	13	2	6+7	2	0	0
23	MF	(Norway) NOR	Marius Larsen	2	0	0+2	0	0	0
24	DF	(Norway) NOR	Bjørn Mæland	5	0	0+5	0	0	0
26	MF	(Norway) NOR	Filip Jørgensen	23	0	17+6	0	0	0
Players away from Odd on loan:
Players who left Odd during the season
5	DF	(Norway) NOR	Birk Risa	20	1	20	1	0	0
7	MF	(Denmark) DEN	Kasper Lunding	15	4	9+6	4	0	0
22	FW	(Norway) NOR	Torgeir Børven	4	6	4	6	0	0

=== Goal scorers ===
Place	Position	Nation	Number	Name	Eliteserien	Norwegian Cup	Total
1	FW	(Norway)	9	Mushaga Bakenga	15	0	15
2	FW	(Norway)	22	Torgeir Børven	6	0	6
2	DF	(Norway)	2	Espen Ruud	6	0	6
4	MF	(Denmark)	7	Kasper Lunding	4	0	4
4	MF	(Norway)	16	Joshua Kitolano	4	0	4
6	FW	(Norway)	20	Tobias Lauritsen	3	0	3
6	FW	(Kosovo)	11	Elbasan Rashani	3	0	3
8	MF	(Norway)	6	Vebjørn Hoff	2	0	2
8	MF	(Norway)	8	Markus Kaasa	2	0	2
8	FW	(Sweden)	22	Robin Simović	2	0	2
8				Own goal	2	0	2
12	DF	(Norway)	5	Birk Risa	1	0	1
12	DF	(Norway)	18	Odin Bjørtuft	1	0	1
12	DF	(Norway)	13	Kevin Egell-Johnsen	1	0	1
				TOTALS	52	0	52

=== Clean sheets ===
Place	Position	Nation	Number	Name	Eliteserien	Norwegian Cup	Total
1	GK	(Norway)	1	Sondre Rossbach	8	0	8
				TOTALS	8	0	8

=== Disciplinary record ===
Number	Nation	Position	Name	Eliteserien		Norwegian Cup		Total	
Number	Nation	Position	Name	Booked	Sent off (straight red)	Booked	Sent off (straight red)	Booked	Sent off (straight red)
1	(Norway)	GK	Sondre Rossbach	1	0	0	0	1	0
2	(Norway)	DF	Espen Ruud	5	1	0	0	5	1
5	(Norway)	DF	John Kitolano	3	0	0	0	3	0
6	(Norway)	MF	Vebjørn Hoff	3	0	0	0	3	0
7	(Montenegro)	MF	Vladimir Rodić	3	0	0	0	3	0
8	(Norway)	MF	Markus Kaasa	2	0	0	0	2	0
9	(Norway)	FW	Mushaga Bakenga	1	0	0	0	1	0
10	(Nigeria)	FW	Kachi	1	0	0	0	1	0
11	(Kosovo)	FW	Elbasan Rashani	3	0	0	0	3	0
16	(Norway)	MF	Joshua Kitolano	2	0	0	0	2	0
18	(Norway)	DF	Odin Bjørtuft	2	0	0	0	2	0
20	(Norway)	FW	Tobias Lauritsen	1	0	0	0	1	0
26	(Norway)	MF	Filip Jørgensen	1	0	0	0	1	0
Players who left Odd during the season:
5	(Norway)	DF	Birk Risa	3	0	0	0	3	0
7	(Denmark)	MF	Kasper Lunding	2	0	0	0	2	0
			TOTALS	33	1	0	0	33	1
