= List of Norwegian football transfers winter 2021–22 =

This is a list of Norwegian football transfers in the 2021–2022 winter transfer window by club. Only clubs of the 2022 Eliteserien and 2022 1. divisjon are included.

== Eliteserien ==
=== Aalesund ===
In: Note: Flags indicate national team as defined under FIFA eligibility rules; some limited exceptions apply. Players may hold more than one non-FIFA nationality.

No.	Pos.	Nation	Player
1	GK	NOR	Sten Grytebust (from (Denmark) Copenhagen)
2	DF	SRB	Petar Golubović (free agent)
3	DF	NOR	Jeppe Moe (from Stabæk)
8	MF	NOR	Fredrik Haugen (from Stabæk)
9	FW	DEN	Alexander Ammitzbøll (from (Denmark) AGF)
25	DF	BIH	Besim Šerbečić (from Rosenborg)
26	GK	NOR	Tor Erik Larsen (from (United States) Purdue Fort Wayne Mastodons)
27	MF	CRO	Dario Čanađija (from Sarpsborg 08)
30	DF	DEN	Alexander Juel Andersen (on loan from (Denmark) OB)
36	DF	NOR	Christian Mork Breivik (promoted from junior squad)

Out: Note: Flags indicate national team as defined under FIFA eligibility rules; some limited exceptions apply. Players may hold more than one non-FIFA nationality.

No.	Pos.	Nation	Player
1	GK	NOR	Andreas Lie (retired)
3	DF	NED	Quint Jansen (to Sandefjord)
4	DF	NOR	Jonas Grønner (to Langevåg)
8	MF	NOR	Fredrik Carlsen (retired)
9	FW	CHI	Niklas Castro (to Brann)
10	FW	DEN	Muamer Brajanac (loan return to (Denmark) Horsens)
18	DF	ISL	Davíð Kristján Ólafsson (to (Sweden) Kalmar)
24	GK	NOR	Enock Mawete Mwimba (to Øygarden)
28	DF	NOR	Håvard Mork Breivik (to Brattvåg)
32	MF	NOR	Kristoffer Strand Ødven (on loan to Hødd)

=== Bodø/Glimt ===
In: Note: Flags indicate national team as defined under FIFA eligibility rules; some limited exceptions apply. Players may hold more than one non-FIFA nationality.

No.	Pos.	Nation	Player
2	DF	DEN	Japhet Sery Larsen (from Brann)
5	DF	NOR	Brice Wembangomo (from Sandefjord)
6	DF	NOR	Isak Helstad Amundsen (loan return from Tromsø)
11	FW	NOR	Runar Espejord (from (Netherlands) Heerenveen, previously on loan at Tromsø)
15	MF	NOR	Anders Konradsen (from Rosenborg)
17	MF	NOR	Gaute Vetti (from Sarpsborg 08)
20	MF	NOR	Fredrik Sjøvold (from Tiller)
25	GK	NOR	Marcus Ellingsen Andersen (loan return from Fløya)
35	MF	NOR	Adan Abadala Hussein (loan return from Florø)
37	MF	NOR	Ask Tjærandsen-Skau (loan return from Start)

Out: Note: Flags indicate national team as defined under FIFA eligibility rules; some limited exceptions apply. Players may hold more than one non-FIFA nationality.

No.	Pos.	Nation	Player
4	DF	NOR	Marius Lode (to (Germany) Schalke 04)
5	DF	NOR	Fredrik André Bjørkan (to (Germany) Hertha BSC)
7	MF	NOR	Patrick Berg (to (France) Lens)
15	FW	NOR	Runar Hauge (to (Scotland) Hibernian, previously on loan at Stjørdals-Blink)
17	MF	EST	Mattias Käit (to (Romania) Rapid București)
20	FW	NOR	Erik Botheim (to (Russia) Krasnodar)
21	DF	NOR	Vegard Kongsro (to HamKam)
22	MF	NOR	Vegard Leikvoll Moberg (to Brann)
26	DF	NOR	Sigurd Kvile (on loan to Kristiansund)
28	FW	BRA	Pernambuco (loan return to (Ukraine) Lviv)
42	DF	NOR	Brynjar Johnsplass (demoted to junior squad)
—	MF	NOR	Nicklas Olai Karlsen Sundsvåg (to Rana)
–	MF	SWE	Axel Lindahl (to (Sweden) Kalmar, previously on loan at (Sweden) Degerfors)
–	FW	NOR	Elias Hoff Melkersen (to (Scotland) Hibernian, previously on loan at Ranheim)

=== HamKam ===
In: Note: Flags indicate national team as defined under FIFA eligibility rules; some limited exceptions apply. Players may hold more than one non-FIFA nationality.

No.	Pos.	Nation	Player
1	GK	NOR	Lars Jendal (loan return from Arendal)
2	DF	NOR	Vegard Kongsro (from Bodø/Glimt)
3	DF	CRC	Fernán Faerrón (on loan from (Costa Rica) Desamparados)
4	DF	USA	Sam Rogers (from (United States) OKC Energy, previously on loan)
4	DF	NOR	Amin Nouri (from Sogndal)
5	DF	CAN	Julian Dunn (from (Canada) Toronto)
12	DF	CAN	Clément Bayiha (from (Canada) CF Montréal)
16	FW	NOR	Pål Alexander Kirkevold (from Stabæk)
19	MF	DEN	Oliver Sørensen (on loan from (Denmark) Midtjylland)
22	DF	USA	Kobe Hernandez-Foster (from (Germany) Wolfsburg U19)
23	MF	NOR	Fredrik Sjølstad (from Molde)
77	FW	UKR	Yuriy Yakovenko (from (Denmark) Esbjerg)

Out: Note: Flags indicate national team as defined under FIFA eligibility rules; some limited exceptions apply. Players may hold more than one non-FIFA nationality.

No.	Pos.	Nation	Player
4	DF	USA	Sam Rogers (to Rosenborg)
5	DF	NOR	Steinar Strømnes (retired)
12	GK	POL	Łukasz Jarosiński (retired)
18	MF	NOR	Niklas Rekdal (to Brattvåg)
22	DF	SWE	Rasmus Lindkvist (to (Sweden) GIF Sundsvall)
23	FW	CAN	Theo Bair (loan return to (Canada) Vancouver Whitecaps)
25	DF	NOR	Davod Arzani (to Asker)
53	FW	SWE	Albert Berisha (to Eidsvold Turn)
—	MF	NOR	Van Zan Lian Bawi Hrin (to Lillehammer, previously on loan at Elverum)
—	MF	NOR	Erik Olaf Krohnstad (to Lysekloster, previously on loan)
—	FW	NOR	Jarmund Øyen Kvernstuen (to Ull/Kisa, previously on loan at Bærum)

=== Haugesund ===
In: Note: Flags indicate national team as defined under FIFA eligibility rules; some limited exceptions apply. Players may hold more than one non-FIFA nationality.

No.	Pos.	Nation	Player
3	DF	NOR	Nikolas Walstad (from Mjøndalen)
5	DF	DEN	Søren Reese (from (Denmark) Midtjylland)
10	MF	NOR	Christos Zafeiris (loan return from Grorud)
11	FW	NOR	Joacim Holtan (from Bryne)
17	MF	NGR	Hilary Gong (from (Netherlands) Vitesse)
21	MF	DEN	Julius Eskesen (from (Denmark) SønderjyskE)
30	MF	SEN	Ibrahima Cissokho (on loan from (Senegal) US Gorée)
32	GK	NOR	Frank Stople (loan return from Stjørdals-Blink)
36	DF	NOR	Eivind Helgeland (loan return from Vard)
38	MF	NOR	Vegard Solheim (promoted from junior squad)
99	FW	NOR	Bilal Njie (from KFUM)

Out: Note: Flags indicate national team as defined under FIFA eligibility rules; some limited exceptions apply. Players may hold more than one non-FIFA nationality.

No.	Pos.	Nation	Player
1	GK	NOR	Helge Sandvik (retired)
2	DF	GAM	Sulayman Bojang (to Skeid)
5	DF	DEN	Benjamin Tiedemann Hansen (to Molde)
6	MF	NOR	Joakim Våge Nilsen (to Vard)
10	MF	NOR	Niklas Sandberg (to Viking)
11	MF	NOR	Kristoffer Velde (to (Poland) Lech Poznań)
22	DF	NOR	Alexander Stølås (to Sandnes Ulf)

=== Jerv ===
In: Note: Flags indicate national team as defined under FIFA eligibility rules; some limited exceptions apply. Players may hold more than one non-FIFA nationality.

No.	Pos.	Nation	Player
1	GK	NOR	Amund Wichne (from Start)
5	DF	NOR	Erik Tobias Sandberg (from Lillestrøm, previously on loan)
8	MF	NOR	Mikael Ugland (from Start)
9	FW	NOR	Erlend Hustad (from Brann)
10	MF	NED	Leandro Fernandes (from (Netherlands) PEC Zwolle)
14	DF	NOR	Ole Martin Kolskogen (on loan from Brann)
15	MF	NOR	Erik Næsbak Brenden (from Sandefjord)
17	FW	GUI	Amadou Diallo (from (Czech Republic) Teplice)
23	MF	NOR	Thomas Liene Ness (loan return from Levanger)
27	DF	DEN	Mathias Haarup (from (Denmark) Hobro)
58	FW	DEN	Aral Şimşir (on loan from (Denmark) Midtjylland)
77	FW	NED	Rodney Antwi (on loan from (Ukraine) Inhulets Petrove)

Out: Note: Flags indicate national team as defined under FIFA eligibility rules; some limited exceptions apply. Players may hold more than one non-FIFA nationality.

No.	Pos.	Nation	Player
8	MF	NOR	Thomas Zernichow (retired)
9	MF	CRC	Diego Campos (to (Sweden) Degerfors)
10	MF	NED	Thomas Kok (to (Germany) Preußen Münster)
17	FW	NGR	Shuaibu Ibrahim (to (Armenia) Noravank)
18	DF	NOR	Jørgen Solli (to Stjørdals-Blink)
26	MF	NOR	Mohammed Badran Abdalhalim (to Start U19)
39	FW	ARG	Pibe Pereira (to (Gibraltar) Bruno's Magpies)
42	DF	NOR	Noah Beisland (on loan to Express)
46	DF	NOR	Håkon Krogelien (on loan to Express)
99	FW	SGP	Ikhsan Fandi (to (Thailand) BG Pathum United)
—	FW	NOR	Alexander Dang (to Øygarden, previously on loan at Egersund)

=== Kristiansund ===
In: Note: Flags indicate national team as defined under FIFA eligibility rules; some limited exceptions apply. Players may hold more than one non-FIFA nationality.

No.	Pos.	Nation	Player
15	FW	NOR	Mikkel Rakneberg (from Ull/Kisa)
16	DF	NOR	Sigurd Kvile (on loan from Bodø/Glimt)
18	MF	NOR	Sebastian Jarl (from Sarpsborg 08)
22	DF	NOR	Martin Sjølstad (from Strømmen)
24	MF	GHA	David Agbo (from (Ghana) Mobile Phone People)
25	DF	GHA	Isaac Annan (from (Ghana) AC Sondisco)
31	FW	NOR	Leander Alvheim (promoted from junior squad)

Out: Note: Flags indicate national team as defined under FIFA eligibility rules; some limited exceptions apply. Players may hold more than one non-FIFA nationality.

No.	Pos.	Nation	Player
12	GK	SWE	Elias Hadaya (on loan to Bryne)
15	DF	NOR	Erlend Sivertsen (to (Sweden) Östersund)
16	DF	NOR	Ivar Furu (to Gamle Oslo)
20	FW	USA	Lagos Kunga (to (United States) Kalonji Pro-Profile)
23	MF	NOR	Pål Erik Ulvestad (retired)
36	DF	NOR	Bendik Brevik (on loan to Levanger)
37	FW	NOR	Oskar Sivertsen (on loan to Hødd)
—	MF	NOR	Sander Lille-Løvø (to Arendal, previously on loan at Brattvåg)

=== Lillestrøm ===
In: Note: Flags indicate national team as defined under FIFA eligibility rules; some limited exceptions apply. Players may hold more than one non-FIFA nationality.

No.	Pos.	Nation	Player
3	DF	NOR	Colin Rösler (from (Netherlands) NAC Breda)
9	FW	NGR	Akor Adams (from Sogndal)
14	MF	NOR	Magnus Knudsen (on loan from (Russia) Rostov)
15	MF	GHA	Eric Taylor (on loan from (Ghana) New Life Academy)
20	FW	KOS	Ylldren Ibrahimaj (from (Russia) Ural Yekaterinburg)
21	FW	ISL	Hólmbert Friðjónsson (on loan from (Germany) Holstein Kiel)
23	MF	NOR	Gjermund Åsen (from Rosenborg, previously on loan)
26	MF	NOR	Dylan Murugesapillai (promoted from junior squad)
77	MF	DEN	Frederik Holst (from (Sweden) Elfsborg)

Out: Note: Flags indicate national team as defined under FIFA eligibility rules; some limited exceptions apply. Players may hold more than one non-FIFA nationality.

No.	Pos.	Nation	Player
3	DF	NOR	Simen Kind Mikalsen (to Råde)
10	FW	NOR	Thomas Lehne Olsen (to (United Arab Emirates) Shabab Al Ahli)
14	MF	NOR	Fredrik Krogstad (to Stabæk)
15	DF	NOR	Josef Baccay (to Odd)
17	FW	NOR	Jonatan Braut Brunes (on loan to Start)
18	MF	NOR	Ulrik Mathisen (on loan to Sogndal)
19	FW	NOR	Uranik Seferi (on loan to Kvik Halden, previously on loan at Skeid)
21	MF	NOR	Magnus Knudsen (to (Russia) Rostov)
22	DF	NOR	Philip Slørdahl (on loan to Sandefjord)
27	FW	NOR	Alexander Hrcka Sannes (retired, previously on loan at Strømmen)
31	MF	NOR	Martin Bergum (on loan to Ull/Kisa)
90	FW	SWE	Daniel Gustavsson (to (Sweden) Örebro)
—	DF	NOR	Erik Tobias Sandberg (to Jerv, previously on loan)

=== Molde ===
In: Note: Flags indicate national team as defined under FIFA eligibility rules; some limited exceptions apply. Players may hold more than one non-FIFA nationality.

No.	Pos.	Nation	Player
1	GK	NOR	Jacob Karlstrøm (from Tromsø)
4	DF	DEN	Benjamin Tiedemann Hansen (from Haugesund)
15	MF	NOR	Markus André Kaasa (from Odd)
19	DF	NOR	Eirik Haugan (from (Sweden) Östersund)
24	MF	NOR	Johan Johanessen Bakke (from Sogndal)
26	GK	NOR	Oliver Petersen (loan return from Grorud)
30	FW	CIV	Mathis Bolly (loan return from Stabæk)
31	DF	NOR	Mathias Fjørtoft Løvik (promoted from junior squad)
33	MF	NOR	Niklas Ødegård (promoted from junior squad)

Out: Note: Flags indicate national team as defined under FIFA eligibility rules; some limited exceptions apply. Players may hold more than one non-FIFA nationality.

No.	Pos.	Nation	Player
1	GK	SWE	Andreas Linde (to (Germany) Greuther Fürth)
8	MF	NOR	Fredrik Sjølstad (to HamKam)
9	FW	NOR	Ohi Omoijuanfo (to (Serbia) Red Star)
12	GK	BEL	Álex Craninx (on loan to (Belgium) Seraing)
19	MF	NOR	Eirik Hestad (to (Cyprus) Pafos)
26	GK	NOR	Mathias Eriksen Ranmark (to Moss, previously on loan)
32	FW	NOR	Niklas Edris Haugland (on loan to Åsane)
–	MF	NOR	Tobias Hestad (to Gjøvik-Lyn, previously on loan to Hødd)

=== Odd ===
In: Note: Flags indicate national team as defined under FIFA eligibility rules; some limited exceptions apply. Players may hold more than one non-FIFA nationality.

No.	Pos.	Nation	Player
3	DF	NOR	Josef Baccay (from Lillestrøm)
5	DF	SVK	Ivan Mesík (on loan from (Denmark) Nordsjælland)
15	FW	NOR	Mikael Ingebrigtsen (from Tromsø)
22	FW	NOR	Abel Stensrud (from Skeid)
19	FW	NOR	Fenuel Temesgen Tewelde (promoted from junior squad)
24	DF	NOR	Dennis Gjengaar (promoted from junior squad)
26	MF	NOR	Jesper Svenungsen Skau (promoted from junior squad)

Out: Note: Flags indicate national team as defined under FIFA eligibility rules; some limited exceptions apply. Players may hold more than one non-FIFA nationality.

No.	Pos.	Nation	Player
3	DF	NOR	Emil Jonassen (retired)
8	MF	NOR	Markus André Kaasa (to Molde)
13	DF	NOR	Kevin Egell-Johnsen (on loan to Kongsvinger)
15	MF	NOR	Eirik Asante Gayi (to (Sweden) Brage)
17	MF	NOR	Elias Skogvoll (to Tromsdalen)
19	DF	NOR	Thomas Hallstensen (to Egersund, previously on loan at Ull/Kisa)
22	MF	NOR	Kristoffer Larsen (to Åsane)
24	DF	NOR	Bjørn Mæland (to Egersund)
29	FW	NOR	Sander Svendsen (loan return to (Denmark) OB)

=== Rosenborg ===
In: Note: Flags indicate national team as defined under FIFA eligibility rules; some limited exceptions apply. Players may hold more than one non-FIFA nationality.

No.	Pos.	Nation	Player
8	MF	NOR	Tobias Børkeeiet (from (Denmark) Brøndby)
11	FW	DEN	Victor Jensen (on loan from (Netherlands) Ajax)
15	DF	USA	Sam Rogers (from HamKam)
18	DF	ARG	Renzo Giampaoli (on loan from (Argentina) Boca Juniors)
27	FW	NOR	Ole Sæter (loan return from Ull/Kisa)
29	FW	NOR	Bryan Fiabema (on loan from (England) Chelsea U19)
39	MF	NOR	Marius Sivertsen Broholm (promoted from junior squad)
41	MF	NOR	Sverre Halseth Nypan (promoted from junior squad)

Out: Note: Flags indicate national team as defined under FIFA eligibility rules; some limited exceptions apply. Players may hold more than one non-FIFA nationality.

No.	Pos.	Nation	Player
6	MF	NOR	Alexander Tettey (retired)
8	MF	NOR	Anders Konradsen (to Bodø/Glimt)
9	FW	MNE	Dino Islamović (to (South Korea) Gangwon)
14	FW	SWE	Rasmus Wiedesheim-Paul (on loan to (Sweden) Mjällby)
15	DF	ISL	Hólmar Örn Eyjólfsson (to (Iceland) Valur)
16	DF	NOR	Even Hovland (to (Sweden) Häcken)
26	FW	NOR	Filip Brattbakk (to Raufoss, previously on loan at Ranheim)
26	DF	BIH	Besim Šerbečić (to Aalesund)
35	FW	NOR	Emil Konradsen Ceïde (on loan to (Italy) Sassuolo)
36	FW	NOR	Ingmar Orkelbog Austberg (to Bryne)
38	DF	NOR	Mikkel Ceïde (on loan to (Sweden) Utsiktens BK, previously on loan at Ranheim)
–	DF	NOR	Warren Kamanzi (to Tromsø, previously on loan at Ranheim)
–	MF	NOR	Gjermund Åsen (to Lillestrøm, previously on loan)

=== Sandefjord ===
In: Note: Flags indicate national team as defined under FIFA eligibility rules; some limited exceptions apply. Players may hold more than one non-FIFA nationality.

No.	Pos.	Nation	Player
3	DF	NED	Quint Jansen (from Aalesund)
5	MF	SWE	Aleksander Damnjanovic Nilsson (on loan from (Sweden) Malmö)
7	FW	NOR	Mohamed Ofkir (from Sarpsborg 08)
11	FW	NOR	Youssef Chaib (from Strømmen)
12	GK	FIN	Hugo Keto (from (Finland) HJK)
15	DF	NOR	Jesper Taaje (from KFUM)
21	DF	NOR	Philip Slørdahl (on loan from Lillestrøm)
23	MF	RSA	Keanin Ayer (from (Sweden) Varberg)
26	MF	NOR	Filip Loftesnes-Bjune (promoted from junior squad)

Out: Note: Flags indicate national team as defined under FIFA eligibility rules; some limited exceptions apply. Players may hold more than one non-FIFA nationality.

No.	Pos.	Nation	Player
2	DF	NOR	Brice Wembangomo (to Bodø/Glimt)
3	DF	AND	Marc Vales (to (Malaysia) Kedah Darul Aman)
5	DF	AUT	Martin Kreuzriegler (to (Poland) Widzew Łódź)
8	MF	BRA	Zé Eduardo (released)
11	MF	NOR	Kristoffer Normann Hansen (to (Poland) Widzew Łódź)
15	MF	NOR	Erik Næsbak Brenden (to Jerv)
21	MF	NOR	Peder Meen Johansen (to Grorud)
22	MF	NOR	Moussa Njie (to KFUM)
23	FW	ISL	Viðar Ari Jónsson (to (Hungary) Budapest Honvéd)
25	MF	NOR	Henrik Falchener (to Ørn Horten)
54	GK	NOR	Andreas Albertsen (on loan to Halsen)
93	FW	NOR	Chuma Anene (to (Cyprus) Omonia Aradippou)
99	GK	NOR	Jesper Granlund (released)
—	MF	NOR	Herman Solberg Nilsen (to Lyn, previously on loan at Fram)

=== Sarpsborg 08 ===
In: Note: Flags indicate national team as defined under FIFA eligibility rules; some limited exceptions apply. Players may hold more than one non-FIFA nationality.

No.	Pos.	Nation	Player
6	MF	NOR	Martin Høyland (from Stabæk)
15	FW	NOR	Steffen Lie Skålevik (loan return from Sogndal)
18	MF	SWE	Serge-Junior Martinsson Ngouali (from (Croatia) Gorica)
19	MF	SEN	Laurent Mendy (loan return from Strømmen)
31	DF	DEN	Anton Skipper (from (Denmark) Brøndby)
40	GK	NOR	Leander Øy (promoted from junior squad)
41	MF	NOR	Tobias Heintz (on loan from (Sweden) Häcken)
–	MF	ISL	Emil Pálsson (loan return from Sogndal)

Out: Note: Flags indicate national team as defined under FIFA eligibility rules; some limited exceptions apply. Players may hold more than one non-FIFA nationality.

No.	Pos.	Nation	Player
6	DF	NOR	Nicolai Næss (to Stabæk)
8	FW	NOR	Mohamed Ofkir (to Sandefjord)
15	MF	NOR	Gaute Vetti (to Bodø/Glimt)
18	MF	NOR	Sebastian Jarl (to Kristiansund)
24	DF	GUI	Mikael Dyrestam (to (Belgium) Seraing)
28	DF	CIV	Benjamin Karamoko (to (Belgium) Charleroi)
29	FW	MLI	Ibrahima Koné (to (France) Lorient)
30	FW	NOR	Mustafa Abdellaoue (retired)
77	MF	CRO	Dario Čanađija (to Aalesund)

=== Strømsgodset ===
In: Note: Flags indicate national team as defined under FIFA eligibility rules; some limited exceptions apply. Players may hold more than one non-FIFA nationality.

No.	Pos.	Nation	Player
18	DF	GHA	Ernest Boahene (free agent)
47	MF	NOR	Andreas Waterfield Skjold (promoted from junior squad)

Out: Note: Flags indicate national team as defined under FIFA eligibility rules; some limited exceptions apply. Players may hold more than one non-FIFA nationality.

No.	Pos.	Nation	Player
3	DF	NOR	Jonathan Parr (retired)
16	FW	NGR	Jordan Attah Kadiri (loan return to (Belgium) Lommel)
23	MF	ISL	Valdimar Þór Ingimundarson (to Sogndal)
50	GK	NOR	Daniel Skretteberg (to Bærum)
56	FW	NOR	Mustapha Fofana (to Ørn Horten, previously on loan)
58	FW	NOR	Simen Hammershaug (to Egersund)
64	MF	NOR	Sebastian Pop (to Notodden, previously on loan at Fram Larvik)
80	DF	NOR	Andreas Rosendal Nyhagen (to Ull/Kisa)

=== Tromsø ===
In: Note: Flags indicate national team as defined under FIFA eligibility rules; some limited exceptions apply. Players may hold more than one non-FIFA nationality.

No.	Pos.	Nation	Player
1	GK	DEN	Jakob Haugaard (on loan from (Sweden) AIK)
2	DF	NOR	Oskar Opsahl (from Vålerenga)
14	DF	NOR	Warren Kamanzi (from Rosenborg)
15	FW	FIN	Jasse Tuominen (on loan from (Sweden) Häcken)
21	FW	NOR	Tobias Hafstad (loan return from Arendal)
24	MF	NOR	Daniel Bassi (promoted from junior squad)
29	FW	NOR	Didrik Hafstad (promoted from junior squad)
32	GK	NOR	Marius Tollefsen (from Alta)
60	FW	USA	Zyen Jones (on loan from (Hungary) Ferencváros)
—	MF	NOR	Tomas Stabell (loan return from Senja)

Out: Note: Flags indicate national team as defined under FIFA eligibility rules; some limited exceptions apply. Players may hold more than one non-FIFA nationality.

No.	Pos.	Nation	Player
1	GK	NOR	Jacob Karlstrøm (to Molde)
2	DF	ISL	Adam Örn Arnarson (to (Iceland) Breiðablik)
6	DF	NOR	Isak Helstad Amundsen (loan return to Bodø/Glimt)
9	FW	NOR	Runar Espejord (loan return to (Netherlands) Heerenveen)
10	FW	NOR	Mikael Ingebrigtsen (to Odd)
13	FW	CZE	Zdeněk Ondrášek (to (Poland) Wisła Kraków)
15	MF	NOR	Magnus Andersen (to Alta)
16	DF	NOR	Tomas Totland (to (Sweden) Häcken)
17	FW	NOR	Daniel Berntsen (to Junkeren)
32	GK	NOR	Mats Trige (on loan to Alta)

=== Viking ===
In: Note: Flags indicate national team as defined under FIFA eligibility rules; some limited exceptions apply. Players may hold more than one non-FIFA nationality.

No.	Pos.	Nation	Player
8	MF	NOR	Markus Solbakken (from Stabæk)
15	MF	NOR	Niklas Sandberg (from Haugesund)
19	MF	NOR	Sondre Auklend (loan return from Åsane)
22	FW	NOR	Daniel Karlsbakk (from Bryne)
30	GK	ISL	Patrik Gunnarsson (from (England) Brentford, previously on loan)
33	DF	NOR	Vebjørn Hagen (loan return from Hødd)
41	MF	NOR	Heine Åsen Larsen (promoted from junior squad)

Out: Note: Flags indicate national team as defined under FIFA eligibility rules; some limited exceptions apply. Players may hold more than one non-FIFA nationality.

No.	Pos.	Nation	Player
1	GK	NOR	Iven Austbø (retired)
8	MF	NZL	Joe Bell (to (Denmark) Brøndby)
10	FW	NOR	Tommy Høiland (to Sandnes Ulf)
12	GK	NOR	Trym Sølvberg Ur (to Sola)
15	MF	NOR	Johnny Furdal (retired)
25	DF	NOR	Sebastian Sørlie Henriksen (on loan to Egersund)
35	MF	NOR	Lars Erik Sødal (on loan to Sandnes Ulf, previously on loan at Egersund)
41	MF	NOR	Heine Åsen Larsen (on loan to Egersund)

=== Vålerenga ===
In: Note: Flags indicate national team as defined under FIFA eligibility rules; some limited exceptions apply. Players may hold more than one non-FIFA nationality.

No.	Pos.	Nation	Player
6	DF	NOR	Vegar Eggen Hedenstad (from (Turkey) Fatih Karagümrük)
18	FW	NGR	Taofeek Ismaheel (on loan from (France) Lorient)
23	DF	ISL	Brynjar Ingi Bjarnason (from (Italy) Lecce)
24	MF	NOR	Petter Strand (from Brann)
26	FW	NOR	Aron Dønnum (on loan from (Belgium) Standard Liège)
30	GK	NOR	Storm Strand-Kolbjørnsen (promoted from junior team)

Out: Note: Flags indicate national team as defined under FIFA eligibility rules; some limited exceptions apply. Players may hold more than one non-FIFA nationality.

No.	Pos.	Nation	Player
6	MF	DEN	Nicolaj Thomsen (to (Denmark) SønderjyskE)
10	FW	SWE	Albin Mörfelt (on loan to (Sweden) Mjällby)
18	DF	NOR	Fredrik Holmé (to Kongsvinger)
21	GK	NOR	Mathias Dyngeland (loan return to (Sweden) Elfsborg)
29	DF	NOR	Oskar Opsahl (to Tromsø)
–	FW	GUI	Ousmane Camara (to (Georgia (country)) Dila Gori, previously on loan)

== 1. divisjon ==
=== Brann ===
In: Note: Flags indicate national team as defined under FIFA eligibility rules; some limited exceptions apply. Players may hold more than one non-FIFA nationality.

No.	Pos.	Nation	Player
1	GK	NOR	Mathias Dyngeland (from (Sweden) Elfsborg)
5	DF	DEN	Andreas Skovgaard (from (Sweden) Örebro)
6	MF	NOR	Vegard Leikvoll Moberg (from Bodø/Glimt)
9	FW	CHI	Niklas Castro (from Aalesund)
10	MF	DEN	Frederik Børsting (from (Denmark) AaB)
13	DF	DEN	Svenn Crone (from (Denmark) Lyngby)
31	MF	NOR	Isak Hjorteseth (loan return from Fyllingsdalen)

Out: Note: Flags indicate national team as defined under FIFA eligibility rules; some limited exceptions apply. Players may hold more than one non-FIFA nationality.

No.	Pos.	Nation	Player
1	GK	NOR	Håkon Opdal (retired)
4	DF	NOR	Ole Martin Kolskogen (on loan to Jerv)
5	MF	NOR	Vajebah Sakor (to (Italy) Triestina)
6	DF	LUX	Lars Krogh Gerson (to Kongsvinger)
9	MF	NOR	Petter Strand (to Vålerenga)
9	FW	NOR	Erlend Hustad (to Jerv, previously on loan at Sandnes Ulf)
14	FW	SWE	Moonga Simba (on loan to (Sweden) Värnamo)
16	MF	FIN	Robert Taylor (to (United States) Inter Miami)
22	DF	SEN	Vieux Sané (released)
23	MF	DEN	Daniel A. Pedersen (to (United States) Orange County)
26	DF	DEN	Japhet Sery Larsen (to Bodø/Glimt)
28	GK	GER	Lennart Grill (loan return to (Germany) Bayer Leverkusen)

=== Bryne ===
In: Note: Flags indicate national team as defined under FIFA eligibility rules; some limited exceptions apply. Players may hold more than one non-FIFA nationality.

No.	Pos.	Nation	Player
9	FW	NOR	Arne Gunnes (from Levanger)
12	GK	SWE	Elias Hadaya (on loan from Kristiansund)
14	DF	SWE	Daniel Hermansson (from (Sweden) Västerås)
17	FW	NOR	Sigurd Grønli (from Tromsdalen)
18	FW	NOR	Jørgen Voilås (from Notodden)
21	FW	NOR	Ingmar Orkelbog Austberg (from Rosenborg 2)
23	DF	NOR	Paul Endre Ullenes (promoted from junior squad)
45	DF	NOR	Christian Røer (from Kongsvinger)
90	FW	NOR	Albert Braut Tjåland (on loan from Molde 2)

Out: Note: Flags indicate national team as defined under FIFA eligibility rules; some limited exceptions apply. Players may hold more than one non-FIFA nationality.

No.	Pos.	Nation	Player
1	GK	NOR	Sondre Vestbø Kyllingstad (on loan to Sola)
9	FW	NOR	Thierry Dabove (to Gamle Oslo)
15	DF	NOR	Kristoffer Hay (to Sandnes Ulf)
17	FW	NOR	Joacim Holtan (to Haugesund)
18	DF	ENG	Josh Robson (to (England) Blyth Spartans)
21	GK	TTO	Nicklas Frenderup (loan return to Ranheim)
22	FW	NOR	Daniel Karlsbakk (to Viking)
23	MF	FRO	Meinhard Olsen (to Mjøndalen)
26	FW	NOR	Torben Dvergsdal (to Varhaug)
29	MF	NOR	Herman Rugland (to Sola, previously on loan)

=== Fredrikstad ===
In: Note: Flags indicate national team as defined under FIFA eligibility rules; some limited exceptions apply. Players may hold more than one non-FIFA nationality.

No.	Pos.	Nation	Player
15	FW	NGR	Innocent Kingsley (from (Turkey) Adanaspor)
16	FW	NOR	Marcus Wenneberg (promoted from junior squad)
17	DF	NOR	Tage Johansen (promoted from junior squad)
22	FW	NOR	Obilor Okeke (from Asker)
25	GK	NOR	Ole Langbråten (promoted from junior squad)

Out: Note: Flags indicate national team as defined under FIFA eligibility rules; some limited exceptions apply. Players may hold more than one non-FIFA nationality.

No.	Pos.	Nation	Player
11	FW	ESP	Maikel Nieves (to Råde)
12	FW	NGR	Taofeek Ismaheel (to (France) Lorient)
13	GK	NOR	Aleksander Karstensen (to Kvik Halden)
16	FW	DJI	Anas Farah Ali (to Moss, previously on loan at Egersund)
17	MF	NOR	Alexander Zoulakis (to Kvik Halden)

=== Grorud ===
In: Note: Flags indicate national team as defined under FIFA eligibility rules; some limited exceptions apply. Players may hold more than one non-FIFA nationality.

No.	Pos.	Nation	Player
1	GK	NOR	Simen Lillevik Kjellevold (from Strømmen)
4	DF	NOR	Akinsola Akinyemi (from Raufoss)
18	MF	NOR	Peder Meen Johansen (from Sandefjord)
24	DF	NOR	William Bjeglerud (loan return from Eidsvold Turn)
25	FW	NOR	Didrik Sereba (from Asker)
27	DF	NOR	Fredrik Carson Pedersen (loan return from Notodden)

Out: Note: Flags indicate national team as defined under FIFA eligibility rules; some limited exceptions apply. Players may hold more than one non-FIFA nationality.

No.	Pos.	Nation	Player
1	GK	NOR	Mats Gulbrandsen Viken (to KFUM)
3	DF	NOR	Tobias Collett (retired)
4	DF	NOR	Arnar Þór Guðjónsson (to Raufoss)
19	FW	NOR	Oscar Aga (to (Sweden) Elfsborg)
25	GK	NOR	Oliver Petersen (loan return to Molde)
26	MF	NOR	Christos Zafeiris (loan return to Haugesund)

=== KFUM ===
In: Note: Flags indicate national team as defined under FIFA eligibility rules; some limited exceptions apply. Players may hold more than one non-FIFA nationality.

No.	Pos.	Nation	Player
4	DF	NOR	Momodou Lion Njie (from Moss)
8	MF	NOR	Simen Hestnes (from Skeid)
9	FW	NOR	Fredrik Brustad (from Mjøndalen)
10	FW	NOR	Thomas Klemetsen Jakobsen (from Moss)
12	GK	NOR	Mats Gulbrandsen Viken (from Grorud)
15	MF	NOR	Moussa Njie (from Sandefjord)
22	MF	NOR	Petter Nosakhare Dahl (from Frigg)
24	DF	NOR	Noah Alexander Størk Jacobsen (promoted from junior squad)
—	MF	NOR	Sverre Sandal (from Nordstrand)

Out: Note: Flags indicate national team as defined under FIFA eligibility rules; some limited exceptions apply. Players may hold more than one non-FIFA nationality.

No.	Pos.	Nation	Player
4	DF	NOR	Marius Alm (released)
6	MF	NOR	Daniel Fredheim Holm (retired)
9	FW	NOR	David Tavakoli (to Lyn)
10	FW	GAM	Alagie Sanyang (to Start)
11	FW	NOR	Bilal Njie (to Haugesund)
20	MF	NOR	Juba Moula (to Ull/Kisa, previously on loan)
24	DF	NOR	Christopher Lindquist (to Lyn)
25	DF	NOR	Jesper Taaje (to Sandefjord)
30	DF	NOR	Aksel Baran Potur (to Moss, previously on loan)
—	MF	NOR	Sverre Sandal (on loan to Nordstrand)

=== Kongsvinger ===
In: Note: Flags indicate national team as defined under FIFA eligibility rules; some limited exceptions apply. Players may hold more than one non-FIFA nationality.

No.	Pos.	Nation	Player
5	DF	NOR	Fredrik Holmé (from Vålerenga)
10	DF	LUX	Lars Krogh Gerson (from Brann)
14	DF	NOR	Marius Aamodt Eriksen (from Kvik Halden)
18	MF	NOR	Tobias Bjørnebye (from Sogndal)
19	DF	NOR	Kristian Jahr (from Strømmen)
24	MF	NOR	Oliver Banken Sandberg (promoted from junior squad)
25	DF	NOR	Kevin Egell-Johnsen (on loan from Odd)
26	FW	NOR	Mathias Bringaker (from Sandnes Ulf)

Out: Note: Flags indicate national team as defined under FIFA eligibility rules; some limited exceptions apply. Players may hold more than one non-FIFA nationality.

No.	Pos.	Nation	Player
5	DF	NOR	Christian Røer (to Bryne)
12	GK	NOR	Andreas Vedeler (to Eidsvold Turn)
19	DF	NOR	Markus Nygård (to Gjelleråsen)
26	DF	NOR	Oskar Wang (to Hønefoss)
40	MF	NOR	Alexander Håpnes (to Moss)
–	GK	FIN	Saku-Pekka Sahlgren (retired)

=== Mjøndalen ===
In: Note: Flags indicate national team as defined under FIFA eligibility rules; some limited exceptions apply. Players may hold more than one non-FIFA nationality.

No.	Pos.	Nation	Player
3	DF	KOS	Leotrim Bekteshi (from (Kosovo) Prishtina)
11	MF	FRO	Meinhard Olsen (from Bryne)
14	MF	NCA	Matias Belli Moldskred (from Start)
16	DF	NOR	Johannes Holstad Dahlby (promoted from junior squad)
17	FW	NOR	Brinder Singh (promoted from junior squad)
18	MF	GHA	Simon Appiah Asamoah (from (Ghana) Liberty Professionals)
23	GK	NOR	Thomas Kinn (from Vard)
35	DF	NOR	Andreas Wilhelmsen Fotland (promoted from junior squad)
37	FW	NOR	Sander Bratvold (promoted from junior squad)

Out: Note: Flags indicate national team as defined under FIFA eligibility rules; some limited exceptions apply. Players may hold more than one non-FIFA nationality.

No.	Pos.	Nation	Player
3	DF	NOR	Nikolas Walstad (to Haugesund)
4	DF	SWE	Daniel Janevski (released)
7	MF	NOR	Lars Olden Larsen (to (Russia) Nizhny Novgorod)
8	FW	NOR	Fredrik Brustad (to KFUM)
11	MF	NOR	Christian Gauseth (retired)
16	MF	ISL	Dagur Dan Þórhallsson (to (Iceland) Breiðablik, previously on loan at (Iceland) Fylkir)
18	MF	NOR	Stian Aasmundsen (to Eik Tønsberg)
29	MF	NOR	Kristoffer Nesse Stephensen (to Åsane)
30	GK	NOR	Idar Lysgård (to Åsane)

=== Ranheim ===
In: Note: Flags indicate national team as defined under FIFA eligibility rules; some limited exceptions apply. Players may hold more than one non-FIFA nationality.

No.	Pos.	Nation	Player
5	DF	NOR	Sander Amble Haugen (from Strømmen)
13	MF	NOR	Sevald Andreassen (promoted from junior squad)
17	FW	NOR	Magnus Høiseth (loan return from Nardo)
24	DF	NOR	Jarl Magnus Knutsen (loan return from Levanger)
23	MF	NOR	Henrik Loholt Kristiansen (from Ull/Kisa)
25	FW	NOR	Preben Asp (promoted from junior squad)
92	GK	TTO	Nicklas Frenderup (loan return from Bryne)

Out: Note: Flags indicate national team as defined under FIFA eligibility rules; some limited exceptions apply. Players may hold more than one non-FIFA nationality.

No.	Pos.	Nation	Player
4	DF	NOR	Martin Lundal (to Stjørdals-Blink, previously on loan)
5	DF	NOR	Øyvind Alseth (to Byåsen)
12	DF	NOR	Warren Kamanzi (loan return to Rosenborg)
17	DF	NOR	Mikkel Ceïde (loan return to Rosenborg)
18	FW	NOR	Filip Brattbakk (loan return to Rosenborg)
20	FW	NOR	Elias Hoff Melkersen (loan return to Bodø/Glimt)
23	MF	ESP	Adrià Mateo López (retired)
24	DF	NOR	Noah Sevaldsen Aarmo (demoted to junior squad)
25	FW	NOR	Preben Asp (on loan to Levanger)

=== Raufoss ===
In: Note: Flags indicate national team as defined under FIFA eligibility rules; some limited exceptions apply. Players may hold more than one non-FIFA nationality.

No.	Pos.	Nation	Player
2	DF	NOR	Trygve Løberg (from Bærum)
5	DF	NOR	Arnar Þór Guðjónsson (from Grorud)
13	MF	NOR	Joachim Lundhagebakken (promoted from junior squad)
21	FW	NOR	Magnus Fagernes (from Moss)
26	FW	NOR	Filip Brattbakk (from Rosenborg)

Out: Note: Flags indicate national team as defined under FIFA eligibility rules; some limited exceptions apply. Players may hold more than one non-FIFA nationality.

No.	Pos.	Nation	Player
2	DF	NOR	Edvard Linnebo Race (to Arendal)
2	DF	NOR	Trygve Løberg (on loan to Gjøvik-Lyn)
5	DF	NOR	Akinsola Akinyemi (to Grorud)
24	FW	FIN	Enoch Banza (on loan to (Finland) AC Oulu)

=== Sandnes Ulf ===
In: Note: Flags indicate national team as defined under FIFA eligibility rules; some limited exceptions apply. Players may hold more than one non-FIFA nationality.

No.	Pos.	Nation	Player
4	DF	NOR	Kristoffer Hay (from Bryne)
5	MF	NOR	Lars Erik Sødal (on loan from Viking)
10	FW	NOR	Tommy Høiland (from Viking)
11	DF	NOR	Alexander Stølås (from Haugesund)
13	GK	NOR	Tord Flolid (promoted from junior squad)
19	MF	NOR	Daniel Braut (promoted from junior squad)
21	DF	NOR	Anders Hiim (promoted from junior squad)
29	FW	NOR	Martin Ramsland (from Start)

Out: Note: Flags indicate national team as defined under FIFA eligibility rules; some limited exceptions apply. Players may hold more than one non-FIFA nationality.

No.	Pos.	Nation	Player
3	DF	FRO	Ári Mohr Jónsson (to (Faroe Islands) HB)
7	FW	NOR	Mathias Bringaker (to Kongsvinger)
8	MF	NOR	Chris Sleveland (on loan to Egersund)
10	MF	GHA	Michael Baidoo (to (Sweden) Elfsborg)
11	FW	NOR	Erlend Hustad (loan return to Brann)
12	GK	NOR	Markus Vassøy Nilsen (released, previously on loan at Madla)
29	MF	NOR	Elias Ivesdal Årsvoll (to Ålgård)

=== Skeid ===
In: Note: Flags indicate national team as defined under FIFA eligibility rules; some limited exceptions apply. Players may hold more than one non-FIFA nationality.

No.	Pos.	Nation	Player
6	MF	NOR	Erik Nordengen (from Fram)
15	DF	NOR	Morten Renå Olsen (from Strømmen)
29	DF	GAM	Sulayman Bojang (from Haugesund)
32	MF	NOR	Mads Foss Aaserud (promoted from junior squad)
39	MF	NOR	Bendik Rise (from Hødd)

Out: Note: Flags indicate national team as defined under FIFA eligibility rules; some limited exceptions apply. Players may hold more than one non-FIFA nationality.

No.	Pos.	Nation	Player
6	MF	NOR	Simen Hestnes (to KFUM)
15	FW	NOR	Uranik Seferi (loan return to Lillestrøm)
16	FW	NOR	Abel Stensrud (to Odd)
18	MF	KOS	Florind Lokaj (demoted to junior team)
20	FW	NOR	Abdul-Basit Agouda (to Strømmen)
21	MF	NOR	Dreni Ademaj (to Ullern)
22	FW	NOR	Francklyn Wollum-Goulehi (demoted to junior team)
23	MF	NOR	Noah Fjellestad Sveen (demoted to junior team)
25	MF	NOR	Henrik Hagen (demoted to junior team)
26	MF	NOR	Emil Tjøstheim (demoted to junior team)
27	FW	NOR	Lukas Håll Thorsen (demoted to junior team)
28	MF	NOR	Shadi Ali (to Strømmen)
29	MF	NOR	Øystein Vestvatn (released)
30	GK	NOR	Kasper Lunde Ofstad (demoted to junior team)
31	DF	NOR	Jason Buan (demoted to junior team)
—	GK	NOR	Adam Tamrat Vik (released)

=== Sogndal ===
In: Note: Flags indicate national team as defined under FIFA eligibility rules; some limited exceptions apply. Players may hold more than one non-FIFA nationality.

No.	Pos.	Nation	Player
5	DF	ISL	Hörður Ingi Gunnarsson (from (Iceland) FH)
7	MF	ISL	Jónatan Ingi Jónsson (from (Iceland) FH)
8	MF	ISL	Valdimar Þór Ingimundarson (from Strømsgodset)
19	MF	NOR	Ulrik Mathisen (on loan from Lillestrøm)
23	MF	NOR	Anders Johannessen Nord (loan return from Øygarden)
26	DF	NOR	Andreas van der Spa (loan return from Arendal)
27	FW	NOR	Sondre Holmlund Ørjasæter (from Stryn)
28	FW	NOR	Emanuel Grønner (from Kjelsås)
29	MF	NOR	Kristoffer Haukås Steinset (from Florø)
30	MF	NOR	Erik Hovden Flataker (promoted from junior squad)
31	GK	NOR	Sondre Nor Midthjell (promoted from junior squad)
35	GK	NOR	Daniel Gjerde Sætren (promoted from junior squad)
37	GK	NOR	Håvard Hetle (loan return from Florø)

Out: Note: Flags indicate national team as defined under FIFA eligibility rules; some limited exceptions apply. Players may hold more than one non-FIFA nationality.

No.	Pos.	Nation	Player
5	DF	NOR	Daniel Eid (to (Sweden) Norrköping)
7	FW	NOR	Steffen Lie Skålevik (loan return to Sarpsborg 08)
10	FW	NGR	Akor Adams (to Lillestrøm)
19	MF	NOR	Tobias Bjørnebye (to Kongsvinger)
20	MF	NOR	Noah Solskjær (released)
22	DF	NOR	Eivind Helgesen (to Hødd, previously on loan at Øygarden)
24	DF	NOR	Tord Salte (to Arendal)
25	MF	NOR	Johan Johanessen Bakke (to Molde)
26	MF	ENG	Ronan Darcy (loan return to (England) Bolton Wanderers)
27	DF	NOR	Adrian Solberg (to Notodden, previously on loan at Øygarden)
28	FW	NOR	Mathias Sundberg (to Ull/Kisa, previously on loan at Øygarden)
29	DF	EST	Henri Järvelaid (to (Estonia) Nõmme Kalju)
30	DF	NOR	Amin Nouri (to Hamkam)
32	FW	NOR	Filip Mardal (to Hødd)

=== Stabæk ===
In: Note: Flags indicate national team as defined under FIFA eligibility rules; some limited exceptions apply. Players may hold more than one non-FIFA nationality.

No.	Pos.	Nation	Player
3	DF	NOR	Nicolai Næss (from Sarpsborg 08)
8	MF	ENG	Curtis Edwards (from (Sweden) Djurgården)
13	DF	NOR	Thor Lange (from (Denmark) Horsens)
14	MF	NOR	Fredrik Krogstad (from Lillestrøm)
17	MF	NOR	Amir Jama (promoted from junior squad)
18	MF	CAN	Patrick Metcalfe (from (Canada) Vancouver Whitecaps)
19	DF	SWE	Victor Wernersson (on loan from (Belgium) Mechelen)
21	DF	NOR	Thomas Vold (promoted from junior squad)
25	DF	NOR	Filip Møller-Hansen Hornburg (promoted from junior squad)

Out: Note: Flags indicate national team as defined under FIFA eligibility rules; some limited exceptions apply. Players may hold more than one non-FIFA nationality.

No.	Pos.	Nation	Player
3	DF	NOR	Yaw Amankwah (retired)
5	DF	SVK	Ivan Mesík (loan return to (Denmark) Nordsjælland)
7	FW	CIV	Mathis Bolly (loan return to Molde)
8	MF	NOR	Fredrik Haugen (to Aalesund)
9	FW	NOR	Pål Alexander Kirkevold (to Hamkam)
10	MF	NOR	Markus Solbakken (to Viking)
16	MF	NOR	Martin Høyland (to Sarpsborg 08)
18	DF	NOR	Jeppe Moe (to Aalesund)
22	MF	DEN	Sammy Skytte (released)
26	MF	POR	Tomás Podstawski (to (Israel) Bnei Yehuda)
29	DF	NOR	Kristoffer Lassen Harrison (on loan to Kjelsås)
67	MF	BEL	Tortol Lumanza (released)
88	FW	NOR	Christopher Cheng (to Strømmen, previously on loan)

=== Start ===
In: Note: Flags indicate national team as defined under FIFA eligibility rules; some limited exceptions apply. Players may hold more than one non-FIFA nationality.

No.	Pos.	Nation	Player
4	DF	NED	Vito Wormgoor (from (United States) Columbus Crew)
6	MF	ISL	Bjarni Mark Antonsson (from (Sweden) Brage)
9	FW	NOR	Jonatan Braut Brunes (on loan from Lillestrøm)
10	FW	GAM	Alagie Sanyang (from KFUM)
16	FW	SWE	Oskar Fallenius (on loan from (Denmark) Brøndby)
17	DF	NOR	August Frobenius (from (Portugal) Sporting CP Academy)
23	MF	NOR	Mathias Grundetjern (from Fløy)
30	DF	GEQ	Basilio Ndong (from (Belgium) Westerlo, previously on loan)
36	FW	NOR	Sander Svela (promoted from junior squad)
49	DF	NOR	Jesper Gregersen (promoted from junior squad)
96	GK	DEN	Mark Fabricius Jensen (from Åsane)
99	MF	NOR	Sondre Solås (promoted from junior squad)

Out: Note: Flags indicate national team as defined under FIFA eligibility rules; some limited exceptions apply. Players may hold more than one non-FIFA nationality.

No.	Pos.	Nation	Player
1	GK	GER	Jonas Deumeland (released)
4	MF	NED	Mohamed El Makrini (to (Netherlands) TEC VV)
6	DF	NOR	Joackim Jørgensen (to Østsiden)
7	MF	NCA	Matias Belli Moldskred (to Mjøndalen)
9	FW	NOR	Martin Ramsland (to Sandnes Ulf)
10	FW	NOR	Eman Markovic (to (Sweden) Norrköping)
12	GK	NOR	Amund Wichne (to Jerv)
16	MF	NOR	Mikael Ugland (to Jerv)
17	FW	NGR	Adeleke Akinyemi (to (Albania) Laçi)
28	MF	NOR	Ask Tjærandsen-Skau (loan return to Bodø/Glimt)
30	FW	NOR	Jakob Ugland (to Lokomotiv Oslo)
31	DF	NOR	Altin Ujkani (to Fløy)
43	DF	NOR	Lyder Daland (on loan to Express)
58	MF	NOR	Preben Hille (to Fløy)

=== Stjørdals-Blink ===
In: Note: Flags indicate national team as defined under FIFA eligibility rules; some limited exceptions apply. Players may hold more than one non-FIFA nationality.

No.	Pos.	Nation	Player
2	DF	NOR	Madhusan Sandrakumar (from Levanger)
4	DF	NOR	Martin Lundal (from Ranheim, previously on loan)
5	MF	NOR	Sjur Lothe (from Notodden)
8	FW	NOR	Ivar Sollie Rønning (from (Faroe Islands) KÍ Klaksvík)
22	DF	NOR	Jørgen Solli (from Jerv)
30	FW	NOR	Jakob Rømo Skille (loan return from Nardo)

Out: Note: Flags indicate national team as defined under FIFA eligibility rules; some limited exceptions apply. Players may hold more than one non-FIFA nationality.

No.	Pos.	Nation	Player
1	GK	NOR	Frank Stople (loan return to Haugesund)
3	DF	NOR	Dejan Corovic (released)
6	MF	NOR	Marius Augdal (to Bærum)
19	FW	NOR	Runar Hauge (loan return to Bodø/Glimt)
23	DF	NOR	Sander Halgunset (to Byåsen)
25	FW	NOR	Lasse Bransdal (to Bærum)
20	MF	NOR	Asle Ertsgaard Hastadklev (to Nardo)
28	DF	NOR	Paweł Chrupałła (loan return to Rosenborg 2)
33	GK	SWE	Albin Svensson (to Florø)

=== Åsane ===
In: Note: Flags indicate national team as defined under FIFA eligibility rules; some limited exceptions apply. Players may hold more than one non-FIFA nationality.

No.	Pos.	Nation	Player
7	MF	NOR	Mats Selmer Thornes (from Øygarden)
8	FW	NOR	Niklas Edris Haugland (on loan from Molde)
9	FW	NOR	Erling Flotve Myklebust (from Vard)
12	MF	NOR	Morten Gamst Pedersen (from Alta)
13	GK	NOR	Thomas Hille (loan return from Sandviken)
19	MF	NOR	Kristoffer Larsen (from Odd)
24	DF	DEN	Oliver Juul Jensen (free agent)
29	MF	NOR	Kristoffer Nesse Stephensen (from Mjøndalen)
30	GK	NOR	Idar Lysgård (from Mjøndalen)

Out: Note: Flags indicate national team as defined under FIFA eligibility rules; some limited exceptions apply. Players may hold more than one non-FIFA nationality.

No.	Pos.	Nation	Player
7	MF	NOR	Sondre Auklend (loan return to Viking)
8	MF	NOR	Tomas Kristoffersen (to Ull/Kisa)
11	MF	NOR	Joakim Hammersland (retired)
12	DF	NOR	Håvard Foldnes (to Sotra)
14	DF	NOR	Jonas Tillung Fredriksen (to Arendal)
18	MF	NOR	Ole Kallevåg (on loan to Lysekloster)
88	FW	NOR	Geir André Herrem (retired)
96	GK	DEN	Mark Fabricius Jensen (to Start)
