= 2020 IK Start season =

Start
2020 season
- Manager: Jóhannes Harðarson
- Stadium: Sør Arena
- Eliteserien: 15th
- Norwegian Cup: Canceled due to the COVID-19 pandemic
- Top goalscorer: League: Eirik Schulze (9); All: Eirik Schulze (9)
Home colours	Away colours

The 2020 season was IK Start's first season back in the Eliteserien following their relegation at the end of the 2018 season. They finished the season in 15th position and where relegated back to the 1. divisjon at the first opportunity.

== Season events ==
On 12 June, the Norwegian Football Federation announced that a maximum of 200 home fans would be allowed to attend the upcoming seasons matches.

On 10 September, the Norwegian Football Federation cancelled the 2020 Norwegian Cup due to the COVID-19 pandemic in Norway.

On 30 September, the Minister of Culture and Gender Equality, Abid Raja, announced that clubs would be able to have crowds of 600 at games from 12 October.

== Squad ==
Note: Flags indicate national team as defined under FIFA eligibility rules; some limited exceptions apply. Players may hold more than one non-FIFA nationality.

No.	Pos.	Nation	Player
1	GK	GER	Jonas Deumeland
2	DF	NOR	Jesper Daland
3	DF	NOR	Vegard Bergan
4	MF	NED	Mohamed El Makrini
6	DF	NOR	Joackim Jørgensen
7	FW	SWE	Kevin Kabran
8	MF	NOR	Eman Markovic
9	FW	NOR	Martin Ramsland
10	FW	NOR	Steffen Lie Skålevik (on loan from Sarpsborg 08)
11	MF	NOR	Eirik Schulze
12	GK	NOR	Amund Wichne
14	MF	NOR	Espen Børufsen
15	DF	NOR	Henrik Robstad

No.	Pos.	Nation	Player
16	MF	NOR	Mikael Ugland
19	MF	NOR	Kasper Skaanes
20	FW	NOR	Mathias Bringaker
21	MF	NOR	Sander Sjøkvist
22	DF	NOR	Kristoffer Tønnessen
23	MF	NOR	Erlend Segberg
24	MF	ISL	Guðmundur Andri Tryggvason
25	DF	NOR	Henrik Gjesdal
27	DF	NOR	Eirik Wichne
30	DF	CRC	Christian Bolaños
43	DF	NOR	Altin Ujkani
50	GK	NOR	Fredrik Repstad Hansen
68	DF	NOR	Johannes Eftevaag

=== Out on loan ===
Note: Flags indicate national team as defined under FIFA eligibility rules; some limited exceptions apply. Players may hold more than one non-FIFA nationality.

No.	Pos.	Nation	Player
5	MF	NOR	Adnan Hadzic (at Sandnes Ulf)
17	FW	NGA	Adeleke Akinyemi (at HamKam)

No.	Pos.	Nation	Player
—	FW	NOR	Kristian Strømland Lien (at Fløy)

== Transfers ==
=== In ===
Date	Position	Nationality	Name	From	Fee	Ref.
16 December 2019	GK	(Norway)	Amund Wichne	Viking	Undisclosed	
1 January 2020	MF	(Norway)	Eirik Schulze	Sogndal	Undisclosed	
16 January 2020	DF	(Norway)	Henrik Gjesdal	Kristiansund	Undisclosed	
28 May 2020	DF	(Norway)	Vegard Bergan	Bodø/Glimt	Undisclosed	
24 August 2020	FW	(Costa Rica)	Christian Bolaños	Saprissa	Undisclosed	
31 August 2020	MF	(Netherlands)	Mohamed El Makrini	Kilmarnock	Undisclosed	

=== Loans in ===
Date from	Position	Nationality	Name	to	Date to	Ref.
6 June 2020	FW	(Norway)	Steffen Skålevik	Sarpsborg 08	End of season	

=== Out ===
Date	Position	Nationality	Name	To	Fee	Ref.
28 February 2020	FW	(Sweden)	Isac Lidberg	Gefle	Undisclosed	
9 March 2020	DF	(Norway)	Espen Hammer Berger	Sandnes Ulf	Undisclosed	
24 August 2020	MF	(Nigeria)	Afeez Aremu	St. Pauli	Undisclosed	
24 September 2020	MF	(Ghana)	Isaac Twum	Mjøndalen	Undisclosed	

=== Loans out ===
Date from	Position	Nationality	Name	to	Date to	Ref.
1 August 2020	MF	(Norway)	Adnan Hadzic	Sandnes Ulf	1 September 2020	
1 August 2020	FW	(Norway)	Kristian Strømland Lien	Fløy	1 September 2020	
13 September 2020	FW	(Nigeria)	Adeleke Akinyemi	HamKam	End of season	

=== Released ===
Date	Position	Nationality	Name	Joined	Date
31 December 2019	GK	(Norway)	Alexander Pedersen	KFUM Oslo	
31 December 2020	FW	(Iceland)	Aron Sigurðarson	Union Saint-Gilloise	
15 May 2020	DF	(Jamaica)	Damion Lowe	Phoenix Rising	16 September 2020

== Friendlies ==
31 January 2020	Start	2–1	Mjøndalen	Kristiansand
17:00 CET (UTC+1)	Afeez 16'; Ramsland 86'	Report	Þórhallsson 81'	Stadium: Sør Arena; Attendance: 409

4 June 2020	Odd	2–1	Start	Skien
16:00 CEST (UTC+2)		Report		Stadium: Skagerak Arena

10 June 2020	Sarpsborg 08	4–0	Start	Sarpsborg
19:00 CEST (UTC+2)		Report		Stadium: Sarpsborg Stadion

== Competitions ==
=== Eliteserien ===
==== Results summary ====
Overall								Home						Away					
Pld	W	D	L	GF	GA	GD	Pts	W	D	L	GF	GA	GD	W	D	L	GF	GA	GD
30	6	9	15	33	56	−23	27	5	6	4	22	20	+2	1	3	11	11	36	−25

Last updated: 22 December 2020.
Source: Results

==== Results by round ====
Round	1	2	3	4	5	6	7	8	9	10	11	12	13	14	15	16	17	18	19	20	21	22	23	24	25	26	27	28	29	30
Ground	H	A	H	H	A	H	A	H	A	H	A	H	A	A	H	A	H	H	A	H	A	H	A	H	A	A	H	A	H	A
Result	D	D	L	L	L	D	L	D	D	D	L	W	L	L	W	L	W	L	L	W	D	L	L	W	W	L	D	L	D	L
Position	7	9	11	13	14	15	15	15	15	15	15	15	15	15	15	15	14	14	14	14	14	14	14	14	13	13	13	14	14	15

Updated to match(es) played on 22 December 2020. Source: Results
A = Away; H = Home; W = Win; D = Draw; L = Loss

==== Results ====
17 June 2020 1	Start	2–2	Strømsgodset	Kristiansand
18:00 CEST (UTC+2)	Bringaker 65'; Markovic 73'	Report	Parr (yellow card) 43'; Salvesen 45+1'; Stengel 83'	Stadium: Sør Arena; Attendance: 200; Referee: Svein Oddvar Moen

21 June 2020 2	Sandefjord	2–2	Start	Sandefjord
18:00 CEST (UTC+2)	Grorud 24' (yellow card) 65'; Foss (yellow card) 36'; Gibson (yellow card) 52'; Rufo 55'	Report	Bringaker 14' (yellow card) 54'; Daland 45'; Skålevik (yellow card) 57'	Stadium: Sandefjord Arena; Attendance: 200; Referee: Mohammad Aslam

25 June 2020 3	Start	2–3	Molde	Kristiansand
18:00 CEST (UTC+2)	Ugland 18'; Skaanes (yellow card) 43'; Skålevik (yellow card) 67'; Markovic (yellow card) 73'; Bringaker 75'	Report	Pedersen 29'; Hussain (yellow card) 34'; Haugen 45'; Hestad (yellow card) 87'; Christensen 90+4'; Gregersen 90+6'	Stadium: Sør Arena; Attendance: 200; Referee: Tore Hansen

27 June 2020 4	Start	0–5	Odd	Kristiansand
18:00 CEST (UTC+2)	Afeez (yellow card) 14'; E.Wichne (yellow card) 50'	Report	Kaasa 4'; Hoff 12'; Børven 49' (pen.), 66'; Ruud (yellow card) 60'; Lauritsen 85'	Stadium: Sør Arena; Attendance: 200; Referee: Sigurd Smehus Kringstad

1 July 2020 5	Haugesund	1–0	Start	Haugesund
18:00 CEST (UTC+2)	Källman (yellow card) 37'; Daland 90+4' (o.g.)	Report	E.Wichne (yellow card) 58'; Daland (yellow card) 90+4'	Stadium: Haugesund Stadion; Attendance: 200; Referee: Usman Aslam

4 July 2020 6	Start	1–1	Viking	Kristiansand
18:00 CEST (UTC+2)	Segberg (yellow card) 67'; Schulze 75'; Ramsland (yellow card) 77'	Report	Bytyqi 84'	Stadium: Sør Arena; Attendance: 200; Referee: Ola Hobber Nilsen

12 July 2020 7	Sarpsborg 08	1–0	Start	Sarpsborg
18:00 CEST (UTC+2)	Lindseth 8'; Thomassen (yellow card) 37'; Coulibaly (yellow card) 45'; Larsen (yellow card) 78'	Report	Schulze (yellow card) 41'	Stadium: Sarpsborg Stadion; Attendance: 200; Referee: Sivert Amland

16 July 2020 8	Start	0–0	Rosenborg	Kristiansand
20:30 CEST (UTC+2)	Aremu (yellow card) 50'; Bergan (yellow card) 64'; Daland (yellow card) 90+2'	Report	Islamović (yellow card) 30'	Stadium: Sør Arena; Attendance: 200; Referee: Kristoffer Hagenes

19 July 2020 9	Brann	1–1	Start	Bergen
20:30 CEST (UTC+2)	Koomson 41'; Kolskogen (yellow card) 59'	Report	Ahamada 28' (o.g.); Kabran (yellow card) 34'; Schulze (yellow card) 45'; Twum (yellow card) 85'; Segberg (yellow card) 86'	Stadium: Brann Stadion; Attendance: 200; Referee: Tommy Skjerven

26 July 2020 10	Start	0–0	Stabæk	Kristiansand
18:00 CEST (UTC+2)	Kabran (yellow card) 40'; Markovic (yellow card) 62'; Twum (yellow card) 84'	Report		Stadium: Sør Arena; Attendance: 200; Referee: Tom Harald Hagen

29 July 2020 11	Aalesund	3–2	Start	Ålesund
18:00 CEST (UTC+2)	Friðjónsson 18', 61' (pen.), 80'; Castro (yellow card) 33'; Bizoza (yellow card) 65'; Määttä (yellow card) 90'	Report	Schulze (yellow card) 14' (goal) 19'; Bringaker 16'; E.Wichne (yellow card) 39'; Segberg (yellow card) 78'	Stadium: Color Line Stadion; Attendance: 200; Referee: Ola Hobber Nilsen

2 August 2020 12	Start	3–0	Mjøndalen	Kristiansand
18:00 CEST (UTC+2)	Tønnessen 20'; Ramsland (yellow card) 26'; Schulze 87'; Skålevik 89'	Report		Stadium: Sør Arena; Attendance: 200; Referee: Kristoffer Hagenes

5 August 2020 17	Molde	5–0	Start	Molde
19:00 CEST (UTC+2)	Omoijuanfo 8' (pen.), 59' (pen.); Christensen (yellow card) 54'; Brynhildsen 68', 74'; Eikrem 86'	Report	Skaanes (yellow card) 80'	Stadium: Aker Stadion; Attendance: 200; Referee: Sivert Amland

9 August 2020 13	Kristiansund	3–2	Start	Kristiansund
18:00 CEST (UTC+2)	Bye 13'; Pellegrino 74'; Coly 82'; Kastrati (yellow card) 90'	Report	Ugland (yellow card) 35'; Skaanes 67', 72'	Stadium: Kristiansund Stadion; Attendance: 200; Referee: Sigurd Smehus Kringstad

17 August 2020 14	Start	2–1	Vålerenga	Kristiansand
20:30 CEST (UTC+2)	Bergan (yellow card) 21'; Schulze 23', 90+4' (penalty missed) 47'; Ugland (yellow card) 36'; Kabran (yellow card) 45'	Report	Tollås (yellow card) 38'; Stokke 75'; Näsberg (yellow card) 87'	Stadium: Sør Arena; Attendance: 200; Referee: Tommy Skjerven

22 August 2020 15	Bodø/Glimt	6–0	Start	Bodø
18:00 CEST (UTC+2)	Boniface 17', 60'; Berg 35'; J.Hauge 53' (pen.), 56'; Zinckernagel 54'	Report		Stadium: Aspmyra Stadion; Attendance: 200; Referee: Tommy Skjerven

30 August 2020 16	Start	1–0	Aalesund	Kristiansand
18:00 CEST (UTC+2)	Twum 29'; Jørgensen (yellow card) 45'; Børufsen (yellow card) 90+3'; Kabran (yellow card) 90+4'	Report	Grønner (yellow card) 90'	Stadium: Sør Arena; Attendance: 200; Referee: Dag Vidar Hafsås

20 September 2020 17	Start	1–2	Kristiansund	Kristiansand
18:00 CEST (UTC+2)	El Makrini (yellow card) 45+3'; Schulze (yellow card) 63'; Bolaños 90+6'	Report	Pellegrino 29'; Aasbak 39' (yellow card) 43'; Diagné (yellow card) 71'	Stadium: Sør Arena; Attendance: 200; Referee: Marius Hansen Grøtta

27 September 2020 19	Stabæk	2–0	Start	Bærum
18:00 CEST (UTC+2)	Hanche-Olsen (yellow card) 22'; Maatsen (yellow card) 50'; Kassi 69'; Solheim 81'	Report	E.Wichne (yellow card) 31'	Stadium: Nadderud Stadion; Attendance: 200; Referee: Sivert Amland

4 October 2020 20	Start	5–1	Haugesund	Kristiansand
18:00 CEST (UTC+2)	Fredriksen 13', 90+1' (o.g.); El Makrini 18'; Kabran (yellow card) 28'; Schulze 33', 60'	Report	Wadji 54'; Ammitzbøll (yellow card) 88'	Stadium: Sør Arena; Attendance: 200; Referee: Kai Erik Steen

18 October 2020 21	Strømsgodset	1–1	Start	Drammen
18:00 CEST (UTC+2)	Jack (yellow card) 39' (yellow-red card) 68'; Mawa 78'; Gunnarsson (yellow card) 79'; Mickelson (yellow card) 90+3'	Report	Bolaños 39' (pen.); El Makrini (yellow card) 66'	Stadium: Marienlyst Stadion; Attendance: 600; Referee: Espen Eskås

24 October 2020 22	Start	0–1	Sandefjord	Kristiansand
18:00 CEST (UTC+2)		Report	Vega (yellow card) 48'; Singh 52'; Vallès (yellow card) 58'	Stadium: Sør Arena; Attendance: 600; Referee: Ola Hobber Nilsen

1 November 2020 23	Rosenborg	1–0	Start	Trondheim
18:00 CET (UTC+1)	Holse 67'	Report	E.Wichne (yellow card) 25'; El Makrini (yellow card) 53' (yellow-red card) 90+1'	Stadium: Lerkendal Stadion; Attendance: 600; Referee: Sivert Amland

8 November 2020 24	Start	3–2	Sarpsborg 08	Kristiansand
18:00 CET (UTC+1)	Segberg 36'; Utvik 47' (o.g.); Ugland (yellow card) 85'; Bolaños (penalty missed) 87'; Kabran 89'; Deumeland (yellow card) 90+3'	Report	Salétros 21'; Halvorsen 45+3' (pen.); Dyrestam (yellow card) 65'	Stadium: Sør Arena; Attendance: 600; Referee: Espen Eskås

22 November 2020 25	Odd	1–2	Start	Skien
18:00 CET (UTC+1)	Jos.Kitolano 64'; Hoff (yellow card) 90+3'	Report	Schulze 51'; Deumeland (yellow card) 64'; Kabran 82'; Ramsland (yellow card) 90+3'; El Makrini (yellow card) 90+3'	Stadium: Skagerak Arena; Attendance: 600; Referee: Ola Hobber Nilsen

28 November 2020 26	Viking	4–1	Start	Stavanger
16:00 CET (UTC+1)	Sebulonsen 20'; Bytyqi (yellow card) 52'; Friðjónsson 62'; Torsteinbø 70', 72'	Report	Kabran 90+1'	Stadium: Viking Stadion; Attendance: 600; Referee: Dag Vidar Hafsås

2 December 2020 27	Start	1–1	Bodø/Glimt	Kristiansand
18:00 CET (UTC+1)	Amundsen 17' (o.g.); Bolaños (yellow card) 26'; El Makrini (yellow card) 29'; Deumeland (yellow card) 75'	Report	Berg (yellow card) 24'; Junker 26' (pen.); Sampsted (yellow card) 32'	Stadium: Sør Arena; Attendance: 600; Referee: Mohammad Usman Aslam

6 December 2020 28	Mjøndalen	1–0	Start	Mjøndalen
17:00 CET (UTC+1)	Twum (yellow card) 25'; Ibrahim 48'; Jansen (yellow card) 87'	Report		Stadium: Consto Arena; Attendance: 200; Referee: Tom Harald Hagen

9 December 2020 29	Start	1–1	Brann	Kristiansand
20:00 CET (UTC+1)	Markovic (yellow card) 65'; Schulze 69'; Segberg (yellow card) 85'	Report	Strand 60'; Bamba (penalty missed) 85'	Stadium: Sør Arena; Attendance: 600; Referee: Ola Hobber Nilsen

22 December 2020 30	Vålerenga	4–0	Start	Oslo
18:00 CET (UTC+1)	Kjartansson 5'; Wichne 14' (o.g.); Sahraoui 30'; Holm 85'	Report		Stadium: Intility Arena; Attendance: 200; Referee: Tom Harald Hagen

==== Table ====
Pos	Team	Pld	W	D	L	GF	GA	GD	Pts	Qualification or relegation
12	Sarpsborg 08	30	8	8	14	33	43	−10	32	
13	Strømsgodset	30	7	10	13	41	57	−16	31	
14	Mjøndalen (O)	30	8	3	19	26	45	−19	27	Qualification for the relegation play-offs
15	Start (R)	30	6	9	15	33	56	−23	27	Relegation to First Division
16	Aalesund (R)	30	2	5	23	30	85	−55	11	Relegation to First Division

Source: Football Association of Norway (in Norwegian)
Rules for classification: 1) Points; 2) Goal difference; 3) Goals scored; 4) Head-to-head points; 5) Head-to-head goal difference; 6) Head-to-head away goals scored (only if between two teams); 7) Head-to-head goals scored; 8) Play-off (only used to decide champions or relegation).
(O) Play-off winners; (R) Relegated

=== Norwegian Cup ===
2020 First round	–
CEST (UTC+2)
Note: Cup cancelled on 10 September due to the COVID-19 pandemic in Norway.

== Squad statistics ==
As of match played 22 December 2020

=== Appearances and goals ===
No.	Pos	Nat	Player	Total		Eliteserien		Norwegian Cup	
No.	Pos	Nat	Player	Apps	Goals	Apps	Goals	Apps	Goals
1	GK	(Germany) GER	Jonas Deumeland	19	0	19	0	0	0
2	DF	(Norway) NOR	Jesper Daland	30	1	30	1	0	0
3	DF	(Norway) NOR	Vegard Bergan	27	0	23+4	0	0	0
4	MF	(Netherlands) NED	Mohamed El Makrini	10	1	10	1	0	0
6	DF	(Norway) NOR	Joackim Jørgensen	22	0	17+5	0	0	0
7	MF	(Sweden) SWE	Kevin Kabran	29	3	27+2	3	0	0
8	MF	(Norway) NOR	Eman Markovic	28	1	20+8	1	0	0
9	FW	(Norway) NOR	Martin Ramsland	17	0	9+8	0	0	0
10	FW	(Norway) NOR	Steffen Skålevik	21	1	10+11	1	0	0
11	MF	(Norway) NOR	Eirik Schulze	29	9	28+1	9	0	0
12	GK	(Norway) NOR	Amund Wichne	12	0	11+1	0	0	0
14	MF	(Norway) NOR	Espen Børufsen	18	0	5+13	0	0	0
15	DF	(Norway) NOR	Henrik Robstad	20	0	7+13	0	0	0
16	MF	(Norway) NOR	Mikael Ugland	13	1	5+8	1	0	0
19	MF	(Norway) NOR	Kasper Skaanes	24	2	9+15	2	0	0
20	FW	(Norway) NOR	Mathias Bringaker	20	4	12+8	4	0	0
21	MF	(Norway) NOR	Sander Sjøkvist	3	0	0+3	0	0	0
22	DF	(Norway) NOR	Kristoffer Tønnessen	29	1	28+1	1	0	0
23	MF	(Norway) NOR	Erlend Segberg	18	1	9+9	1	0	0
27	DF	(Norway) NOR	Eirik Wichne	29	0	27+2	0	0	0
30	FW	(Costa Rica) CRC	Christian Bolaños	12	2	12	2	0	0
Players away from Start on loan:
5	DF	(Norway) NOR	Adnan Hadzic	1	0	0+1	0	0	0
17	FW	(Nigeria) NGA	Adeleke Akinyemi	3	0	0+3	0	0	0
Players who left Start during the season
4	MF	(Nigeria) NGA	Afeez Aremu	4	0	4	0	0	0
18	MF	(Ghana) GHA	Isaac Twum	10	1	8+2	1	0	0

=== Goal scorers ===
Place	Position	Nation	Number	Name	Eliteserien	Norwegian Cup	Total
1	MF	(Norway)	11	Eirik Schulze	9	0	9
2				Own goal	5	0	5
3	FW	(Norway)	20	Mathias Bringaker	4	0	4
4	MF	(Sweden)	7	Kevin Kabran	3	0	3
5	MF	(Norway)	19	Kasper Skaanes	2	0	2
5	FW	(Costa Rica)	30	Christian Bolaños	2	0	2
7	MF	(Norway)	8	Eman Markovic	1	0	1
7	DF	(Norway)	2	Jesper Daland	1	0	1
7	MF	(Norway)	16	Mikael Ugland	1	0	1
7	DF	(Norway)	22	Kristoffer Tønnessen	1	0	1
7	FW	(Norway)	10	Steffen Skålevik	1	0	1
7	MF	(Ghana)	18	Isaac Twum	1	0	1
7	MF	(Netherlands)	4	Mohamed El Makrini	1	0	1
7	MF	(Norway)	23	Erlend Segberg	1	0	1
				TOTALS	33	0	33

=== Clean sheets ===
Place	Position	Nation	Number	Name	Eliteserien	Norwegian Cup	Total
1	GK	(Germany)	1	Jonas Deumeland	3	0	3
2	GK	(Norway)	12	Amund Wichne	1	0	1
				TOTALS	4	0	4

=== Disciplinary record ===
Number	Nation	Position	Name	Eliteserien		Norwegian Cup		Total	
Number	Nation	Position	Name	Booked	Sent off (straight red)	Booked	Sent off (straight red)	Booked	Sent off (straight red)
1	(Germany)	GK	Jonas Deumeland	3	0	0	0	3	0
2	(Norway)	DF	Jesper Daland	2	0	0	0	2	0
3	(Norway)	DF	Vegard Bergan	2	0	0	0	2	0
4	(Netherlands)	MF	Mohamed El Makrini	6	1	0	0	6	1
6	(Norway)	DF	Joackim Jørgensen	1	0	0	0	1	0
7	(Sweden)	FW	Kevin Kabran	5	0	0	0	5	0
8	(Norway)	MF	Eman Markovic	3	0	0	0	3	0
9	(Norway)	FW	Martin Ramsland	3	0	0	0	3	0
10	(Norway)	FW	Steffen Skålevik	2	0	0	0	2	0
11	(Norway)	MF	Eirik Schulze	4	0	0	0	4	0
14	(Norway)	MF	Espen Børufsen	1	0	0	0	1	0
16	(Norway)	MF	Mikael Ugland	3	0	0	0	3	0
19	(Norway)	MF	Kasper Skaanes	2	0	0	0	2	0
20	(Norway)	FW	Mathias Bringaker	1	0	0	0	1	0
23	(Norway)	MF	Erlend Segberg	4	0	0	0	4	0
27	(Norway)	DF	Eirik Wichne	5	0	0	0	5	0
30	(Costa Rica)	FW	Christian Bolaños	1	0	0	0	1	0
Players who left Start during the season:
4	(Nigeria)	MF	Afeez Aremu	2	0	0	0	2	0
18	(Ghana)	MF	Isaac Twum	2	0	0	0	2	0
			TOTALS	52	1	0	0	52	1
