= Torje Wichne =

Norwegian footballer (born 1997)

Personal information
- Date of birth: 12 May 1997 (age 29)
- Place of birth: Oslo, Norway
- Height: 1.72 m (5 ft 8 in)
- Position: Defender

Team information
- Current team: Mandalskameratene
- Number: 2

Youth career
- Mandalskameratene

Senior career*
Years	Team	Apps	(Gls)
2013–2016	Mandalskameratene	72	(9)
2017–2018	Fløy	47	(4)
2019–2024	Jerv	147	(4)
2024–	Mandalskameratene	6	(2)
- * Club domestic league appearances and goals as of 1 February 2025

Torje Wichne (born 12 May 1997) is a Norwegian footballer who plays as a defender for Mandalskameratene.

== Career ==
On 3 April 2022, he made his Eliteserien debut for Jerv in a 1–0 win against Strømsgodset.

== Personal life ==
He was born at Rikshospitalet as a part of quadruplets, all boys. They grew up in Mandal. His brothers Amund and Eirik also became footballers.
