= Kevin Kabran =

Swedish footballer

Personal information
- Full name: Kevin Alexander Kabran
- Date of birth: 22 November 1993 (age 32)
- Place of birth: Stockholm, Sweden
- Height: 1.85 m (6 ft 1 in)
- Position: Left winger

Youth career
- Boo FF
- –2011: Vasalund

Senior career*
Years	Team	Apps	(Gls)
2012–2017	Vasalund	95	(29)
2014–2015	→ Den Bosch (loan)	9	(0)
2017	Brommapojkarna	30	(11)
2018–2021	Start	66	(10)
2019	→ Elfsborg (loan)	11	(0)
2021–2023	Viking	58	(8)
2023	Stabæk	20	(3)
2024	Politehnica Iași	12	(0)
2024	Panargiakos	7	(3)
- * Club domestic league appearances and goals as of 28 April 2024

Kevin Alexander Kabran (born 22 November 1993) is a Swedish footballer who plays as a left winger for Super League Greece 2 side Panargiakos F.C.

== Career ==
Kabran played for Vasalund between 2012 and 2014, before joining the Netherlands club Den Bosch ahead of the 2014–15 season. After an unsuccessful stay in the Netherlands he moved back to Vasalund. After impressing in Vasalund, Kabran signed for Brommapojkarna ahead of the 2017 season. After one season in the club, he moved to Norwegian side IK Start. He then made his Eliteserien debut on 11 March 2018 against Tromsø.

On 22 January 2021, Kabran signed a three-year contract with Viking FK.

In March 2023, Kabran signed for Stabæk.

== Career statistics ==
=== Club ===
As of match played 28 April 2024

Appearances and goals by club, season and competition
Club	Season	League			National Cup		Other		Total	
Club	Season	Division	Apps	Goals	Apps	Goals	Apps	Goals	Apps	Goals
Vasalund	2012	Division 1	25	6	0	0	–		25	6
Vasalund	2013	Division 1	25	7	2	2	–		27	9
Vasalund	2014	Division 1	8	4	0	0	–		8	4
Vasalund	2015	Division 1	11	2	1	0	–		12	2
Vasalund	2016	Division 1	26	10	1	0	2 (Note: Appearances in promotion play-offs)	1	29	11
Vasalund	Total		95	29	4	2	2	1	101	32
Den Bosch (loan)	2014–15	Eerste Divisie	9	0	1	0	–		10	0
Brommapojkarna	2017	Superettan	30	11	5	2	–		35	13
Start	2018	Eliteserien	22	6	2	1	–		24	7
Start	2019	1. divisjon	15	1	0	0	3	0	18	1
Start	2020	Eliteserien	29	3	–		–		29	3
Start	Total		66	10	2	1	3	0	71	11
Elfsborg (loan)	2019	Allsvenskan	11	0	0	0	–		11	0
Viking	2021	Eliteserien	28	3	2	0	–		30	3
Viking	2022	Eliteserien	30	5	5	2	6 (Note: Appearances in UEFA Europa Conference League)	1	41	8
Viking	Total		58	8	7	2	6	1	71	11
Stabæk	2023	Eliteserien	20	3	1	0	–		21	3
Politehnica Iași	2023–24	Liga I	12	0	–		–		12	0
Career total			301	61	20	7	11	2	332	70

== Honours ==
Brommapojkarna

- Superettan: 2017
