= Kasper Lunding =

Danish footballer (born 1999)

Personal information
- Full name: Kasper Lunding Jakobsen
- Date of birth: 17 July 1999 (age 27)
- Place of birth: Aarhus, Denmark
- Height: 1.78 m (5 ft 10 in)
- Position: Winger

Team information
- Current team: Aarhus Fremad
- Number: 11

Youth career
- VRI
- AGF

Senior career*
Years	Team	Apps	(Gls)
2018–2020	AGF	13	(2)
2020	→ Odd (loan)	15	(4)
2020–2023	Heracles Almelo	30	(0)
2023	Aalesund II	2	(1)
2023	Aalesund	15	(0)
2023–2024	Vendsyssel	16	(0)
2024–	Aarhus Fremad	52	(3)

International career
2014–2015	Denmark U16	6	(0)
2015	Denmark U17	3	(0)
2016–2017	Denmark U18	4	(1)
2017–2018	Denmark U19	4	(0)
2019	Denmark U20	1	(0)
- * Club domestic league appearances and goals as of 2 June 2026

Kasper Lunding Jakobsen (born 17 July 1999) is a Danish footballer who plays as a winger for Danish 1st Division side Aarhus Fremad.

== Club career ==
On 21 December 2022, Lunding Jakobsen signed a contract with Aalesund in Norway until the summer of 2026. On 1 September 2023, he moved to Vendsyssel FF on a deal until June 2026.

On July 10, 2024, Danish 2nd Division side Aarhus Fremad confirmed that Lunding joined the club from Vendsyssel.

== Career statistics ==
As of match played 16 May 2023

Club	Season	League			Danish Cup		Total	
Club	Season	Division	Apps	Goals	Apps	Goals	Apps	Goals
AGF	2017–18	Danish Superliga	0	0	2	0	2	0
AGF	2018–19	Danish Superliga	10	2	1	0	11	2
AGF	2019–20	Danish Superliga	3	0	1	0	4	0
AGF	Total		13	2	4	0	17	2
Odd (loan)	2020	Eliteserien	15	4	0	0	15	4
Odd (loan)	Total		15	4	0	0	15	4
Heracles	2020–21	Eredivisie	19	0	1	0	20	0
Heracles	2021–22	Eredivisie	6	0	1	0	7	0
Heracles	2022–23	Eerste Divisie	5	0	0	0	5	0
Heracles	Total		30	0	2	0	32	0
Aalesund	2023	Eliteserien	7	0	0	0	7	0
Aalesund	Total		7	0	0	0	7	0
Career total			65	6	6	0	71	6
