= Marius Larsen =

Norwegian footballer (born 2000)

Personal information
- Full name: Marius Bustgaard Larsen
- Date of birth: 14 May 2000 (age 26)
- Position: Midfielder

Team information
- Current team: Grorud
- Number: 7

Youth career
- Odd

Senior career*
Years	Team	Apps	(Gls)
2015–2020	Odd 2	95	(16)
2018–2020	Odd	6	(0)
2021	Holstein Kiel	0	(0)
2021–2022	Pors	38	(27)
2023–2024	Tromsdalen	53	(24)
2025	KTP	10	(0)
2025	Alta	14	(2)
2026–	Grorud	19	(5)

International career
2015	Norway U15	3	(0)
2016	Norway U16	4	(1)
2017	Norway U17	2	(0)
2019	Norway U19	1	(0)
- * Club domestic league appearances and goals as of 15 November 2026

Marius Bustgaard Larsen (born 14 May 2000) is a Norwegian footballer who plays as a midfielder who plays for Grorud.

== Club career ==
On 21 November 2024, newly promoted Veikkausliiga club Kotkan Työväen Palloilijat (KTP) announced the signing of Larsen on a 1+1-year contract. His deal was terminated on 28 June 2025.
