= Mathias Bringaker =

Norwegian footballer (born 1997)

Personal information
- Full name: Mathias Bringaker
- Date of birth: 30 January 1997 (age 29)
- Place of birth: Stavanger, Norway
- Height: 1.79 m (5 ft 10 in)
- Position: Forward

Team information
- Current team: Mjøndalen IF
- Number: 9

Youth career
- 2012–2013: Staal Jørpeland
- 2013–2015: Viking

Senior career*
Years	Team	Apps	(Gls)
2016–2017	Viking	48	(9)
2018–2020	Start	69	(16)
2021	Sandnes Ulf	29	(5)
2022	Kongsvinger	26	(9)
2023–	Mjøndalen IF	69	(20)

International career
2012	Norway U15	2	(0)
2013	Norway U16	1	(0)
- * Club domestic league appearances and goals as of 15 November 2026

Mathias Bringaker (born 30 January 1997) is a Norwegian footballer currently playing for Mjøndalen IF in 2. divisjon.

Bringaker was born in Stavanger, but spent his whole youth in Jørpeland. He played for Staal Jørpeland until 2013, where he was picked up by Stavanger-based Viking to represent their youth squad. In 2016, he got his chance with the senior team as he signed his first professional contract at the club. He made his full debut in the Norwegian Premier League coming on as a substitute against Vålerenga in the 62nd minute. He scored in the 88th minute to put Viking 2–0 up against Vålerenga at Ullevaal Stadion.

== Career statistics ==
=== Club ===
As of match played 27 November 2021

Appearances and goals by club, season and competition
Club	Season	League			National Cup		Continental		Total	
Club	Season	Division	Apps	Goals	Apps	Goals	Apps	Goals	Apps	Goals
Viking	2016	Eliteserien	24	5	2	1	—		26	6
Viking	2017	Eliteserien	24	4	1	1	—		25	5
Viking	Total		48	9	3	2	—		51	11
Start	2018	Eliteserien	21	5	4	2	—		25	7
Start	2019	1. divisjon	28	7	1	0	—		29	7
Start	2020	Eliteserien	20	4	—		—		20	4
Start	Total		69	16	5	2	—		74	18
Sandnes Ulf	2021	1. divisjon	29	5	3	4	—		32	9
Career total			146	30	11	8	0	0	157	38

== Honours ==
Individual

- Norwegian First Division Player of the Month: September 2022
