= Sander Sjøkvist =

Norwegian footballer (born 1999)

Personal information
- Full name: Sander Hansen Sjøkvist
- Date of birth: 9 March 1999 (age 27)
- Place of birth: Kristiansand, Norway
- Height: 1.81 m (5 ft 11 in)
- Position: Midfielder

Team information
- Current team: KFUM
- Number: 21

Youth career
- Vigør
- Start

Senior career*
Years	Team	Apps	(Gls)
2019–2025	Start	123	(17)
2026–	KFUM	12	(0)
- * Club domestic league appearances and goals as of 23 July 2026

Sander Hansen Sjøkvist (born 9 March 1999) is a Norwegian football midfielder who plays for KFUM.

Following a youth career in Start, he made his senior debut in March 2019 and his first-tier debut in June 2020 against Molde.
