= Amund Wichne =

Norwegian footballer (born 1997)

Personal information
- Full name: Amund Wichne
- Date of birth: 12 May 1997 (age 29)
- Place of birth: Oslo, Norway
- Height: 1.82 m (6 ft 0 in)
- Position: Goalkeeper

Youth career
- –2014: Mandalskameratene
- 2014–2016: Viking

Senior career*
Years	Team	Apps	(Gls)
2012–2014	Mandalskameratene	22	(0)
2014–2019	Viking 2	52	(0)
2014	→ Mandalskameratene (loan)	9	(0)
2016–2019	Viking	21	(0)
2016	→ Åsane (loan)	4	(0)
2020–2022	Start	33	(0)
2022–2023	Jerv	5	(0)
2023–2026	Haugesund	18	(0)

International career
2012	Norway U15	4	(0)
2013	Norway U16	12	(0)
2014	Norway U17	10	(0)
2014–2015	Norway U18	11	(0)
2016	Norway U19	2	(0)
- * Club domestic league appearances and goals as of 1 December 2025

Amund Wichne (born 12 May 1997) is a former Norwegian footballer who played as a goalkeeper. He is currentley sporting director for Mandalskameratene.

== Career ==
Wichne signed for Viking in the summer of 2014. In 2016, he was loaned out to Åsane where he would play 4 matches before returning to his parent club. He made his league debut for Viking against Molde on 17 September 2017.

Wichne moved to Start in 2020. On 1 March 2022, he terminated his contract with the club. The next day, he signed for Jerv.

In January 2023, he signed for Haugesund on a two-year contract.

== Personal life ==
He was born at Rikshospitalet as a part of quadruplets, all boys. They grew up in Mandal. His brothers Eirik and Torje also became footballers.

== Career statistics ==
As of match played 13 July 2025

Club	Season	League			Cup		Total	
Club	Season	Division	Apps	Goals	Apps	Goals	Apps	Goals
Viking	2016	Eliteserien	0	0	0	0	0	0
Viking	2017	Eliteserien	6	0	2	0	8	0
Viking	2018	1. divisjon	12	0	2	0	14	0
Viking	2019	Eliteserien	3	0	1	0	4	0
Viking	Total		21	0	5	0	26	0
Åsane (loan)	2016	1. divisjon	4	0	0	0	4	0
Start	2020	Eliteserien	12	0	—		12	0
Start	2021	1. divisjon	21	0	1	0	22	0
Start	Total		33	0	1	0	34	0
Jerv	2022	Eliteserien	5	0	0	0	5	0
Haugesund	2023	Eliteserien	2	0	3	0	5	0
Haugesund	2024	Eliteserien	0	0	0	0	0	0
Haugesund	2025	Eliteserien	12	0	0	0	12	0
Haugesund	Total		14	0	3	0	17	0
Career total			77	0	9	0	86	0

== Honours ==
Viking

- 1. divisjon: 2018
- Norwegian Football Cup: 2019
