= Bjørn Mæland =

Norwegian footballer (born 2001)

Personal information
- Date of birth: 24 February 2001 (age 25)
- Place of birth: Porsgrunn, Norway
- Height: 1.84 m (6 ft 0 in)
- Position: Defender

Team information
- Current team: Egersund
- Number: 3

Youth career
- –2017: Eidanger
- 2018–2020: Odds BK

Senior career*
Years	Team	Apps	(Gls)
2016–2017	Eidanger	12	(1)
2018–2021	Odd 2	72	(2)
2020–2021	Odd	5	(0)
2022–2026	Egersund	103	(2)
2022–2026	Egersund 2	3	(0)
2027–	Lyn	0	(0)

International career^{‡}
2018	Norway U17	4	(0)
2019	Norway U18	8	(0)
- * Club domestic league appearances and goals as of 18 October 2026 ‡ National team caps and goals as of 29 June 2020

Bjørn Mæland (born 24 February 2001) is a Norwegian footballer currently playing as a defender for Egersund.

== Career statistics ==
=== Club ===
As of 29 June 2020.

Club	Season	League			Cup		Continental		Other		Total	
Club	Season	Division	Apps	Goals	Apps	Goals	Apps	Goals	Apps	Goals	Apps	Goals
Eidanger	2016	4. divisjon	11	0	0	0	–		0	0	11	0
Eidanger	2017	5. divisjon	1	1	0	0	–		0	0	1	1
Eidanger	Total		12	1	0	0	0	0	0	0	12	1
Odds BK	2020	Eliteserien	1	0	0	0	–		0	0	1	0
Career total			13	1	0	0	0	0	0	0	13	1
