= Mikael Ugland =

Norwegian footballer (born 2000)

Personal information
- Full name: Mikael Birk Giæver Ugland
- Date of birth: 24 January 2000 (age 26)
- Position: Midfielder

Team information
- Current team: Start
- Number: 18

Youth career
- Våg
- Start

Senior career*
Years	Team	Apps	(Gls)
2018–2021	Start	39	(2)
2018	→ Flekkerøy (loan)	19	(1)
2022–2024	Jerv	73	(9)
2025–	Start	37	(4)

International career^{‡}
2015	Norway U15	4	(0)
2016	Norway U16	19	(4)
2017	Norway U17	11	(1)
2018	Norway U18	13	(2)
2019	Norway U19	8	(0)
- * Club domestic league appearances and goals as of 22 August 2026 ‡ National team caps and goals as of 27 June 2020

Mikael Birk Giæver Ugland (born 24 January 2000) is a Norwegian professional footballer who plays for Start.

Following a youth career in Start, he made his senior debut in the 2017 Norwegian Football Cup before joining Flekkerøy IL on loan in 2018. Returning to Start, he made his league debut in May 2019 and his first-tier debut in June 2020 against Sandefjord. In the next game, against Molde, he scored his first Start goal. He moved to Jerv in February 2022.
