= Eirik Wichne =

Norwegian footballer (born 1997)

Personal information
- Date of birth: 12 May 1997 (age 29)
- Place of birth: Oslo, Norway
- Position: Defender

Team information
- Current team: Sarpsborg 08
- Number: 32

Youth career
- Mandalskameratene

Senior career*
Years	Team	Apps	(Gls)
2013–2014	Mandalskameratene		
2015–2020	Start	127	(2)
2021–	Sarpsborg 08	147	(4)
- * Club domestic league appearances and goals as of 23 July 2026

Eirik Wichne (born 12 May 1997) is a Norwegian professional footballer who plays for Sarpsborg, as a defender.

== Personal life ==
He was born at Rikshospitalet as a part of quadruplets, all boys. They grew up in Mandal. His brothers Amund and Torje also became footballers.

== Career statistics ==
As of match played 29 June 2025

Appearances and goals by club, season and competition
Club	Season	League			National Cup		Other		Total	
Club	Season	Division	Apps	Goals	Apps	Goals	Apps	Goals	Apps	Goals
Start	2016	Tippeligaen	20	0	2	1	—		22	1
Start	2017	OBOS-ligaen	27	0	0	0	—		27	0
Start	2018	Eliteserien	23	0	4	0	—		27	0
Start	2019	OBOS-ligaen	28	2	1	0	—		29	2
Start	2020	Eliteserien	29	0	0	0	—		29	0
Start	Total		127	2	7	1	0	0	134	3
Sarpsborg 08	2021	Eliteserien	27	1	2	0	—		29	1
Sarpsborg 08	2022	Eliteserien	24	0	3	1	—		27	1
Sarpsborg 08	2023	Eliteserien	29	2	5	0	—		34	2
Sarpsborg 08	2024	Eliteserien	28	1	4	0	—		32	1
Sarpsborg 08	2025	Eliteserien	11	0	4	0	—		15	0
Sarpsborg 08	Total		119	4	18	1	0	0	137	5
Career total			246	6	25	2	0	0	271	8
