= Eirik Schulze =

Norwegian footballer (born 1993)

Personal information
- Full name: Eirik Wiberg Schulze
- Date of birth: 7 January 1993 (age 33)
- Place of birth: Mandal, Norway
- Height: 1.77 m (5 ft 9 1/2 in)
- Position: Midfielder

Team information
- Current team: Start
- Number: 11

Youth career
- –2009: Mandalskameratene

Senior career*
Years	Team	Apps	(Gls)
2009–2011	Mandalskameratene		
2011–2013	Viking	3	(0)
2014–2015	Strømmen	55	(10)
2016	Sandnes Ulf	28	(3)
2017–2019	Sogndal	84	(23)
2020–	Start	157	(50)
- * Club domestic league appearances and goals as of 22 August 2026

Eirik Schulze (born 7 January 1993) is a Norwegian footballer who plays as a midfielder for Start.

Schulze was born in Mandal. He transferred from Mandalskameratene to Viking in 2011. He made three appearances for the club in Tippeligaen, one in 2011 and two in 2013, but was released from his contract after the 2013 season. Ahead of the 2014 season he joined Strømmen IF. In the summer of 2019 Schulze signed a deal with Start beginning from 1 January 2020.

== Career statistics ==
As of 22 August 2026

Club	Season	Division	League		Cup		Total	
Club	Season	Division	Apps	Goals	Apps	Goals	Apps	Goals
Mandalskameratene	2009	2. divisjon	1	0	0	0	1	0
Mandalskameratene	2010	3. divisjon	2	0	1	0	3	0
Mandalskameratene	Total		3	0	1	0	4	0
Viking	2011	Tippeligaen	1	0	0	0	1	0
Viking	2012	Tippeligaen	0	0	0	0	0	0
Viking	2013	Tippeligaen	2	0	2	0	4	0
Viking	Total		3	0	2	0	5	0
Strømmen	2014	1. divisjon	26	6	1	0	27	6
Strømmen	2015	OBOS-ligaen	29	4	2	0	31	4
Strømmen	Total		55	10	3	0	58	10
Sandnes Ulf	2016	OBOS-ligaen	28	3	2	0	30	3
Sogndal	2017	Eliteserien	25	6	1	0	26	6
Sogndal	2018	OBOS-ligaen	30	8	1	0	31	8
Sogndal	2019	OBOS-ligaen	29	9	2	0	31	9
Sogndal	Total		84	23	4	0	88	23
Start	2020	Eliteserien	29	9	0	0	29	9
Start	2021	OBOS-ligaen	29	9	2	2	31	11
Start	2022	OBOS-ligaen	30	11	2	0	32	11
Start	2023	OBOS-ligaen	1	0	0	0	1	0
Start	2024	OBOS-ligaen	29	9	1	1	30	10
Start	2025	OBOS-ligaen	26	11	2	1	28	12
Start	2026	Eliteserien	13	1	0	0	13	1
Start	Total		157	50	7	4	164	54
Career total			330	86	19	4	349	90
