= Steffen Lie Skålevik =

Norwegian footballer (born 1993)

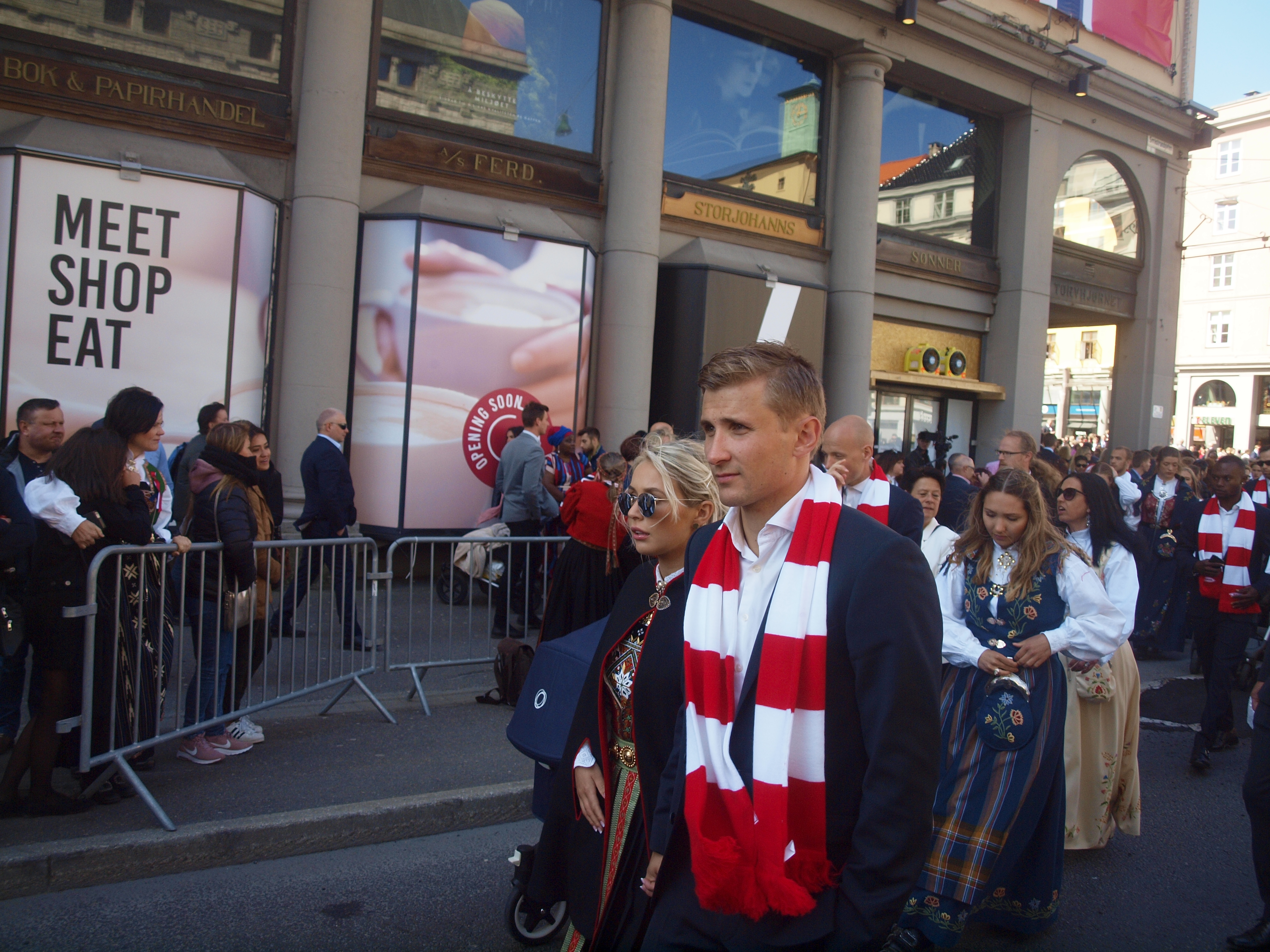

Personal information
- Date of birth: 31 January 1993 (age 33)
- Place of birth: Sotra, Norway
- Height: 1.80 m (5 ft 11 in)
- Position: Forward

Team information
- Current team: Åsane
- Number: 11

Youth career
- 2009–2011: Sotra
- 2012–2013: Brann

Senior career*
Years	Team	Apps	(Gls)
2013–2015	Nest-Sotra	53	(27)
2015–2019	Brann	65	(18)
2017	→ Start (loan)	11	(10)
2019–2023	Sarpsborg 08	70	(8)
2020	→ Start (loan)	21	(1)
2021	→ Sogndal (loan)	13	(3)
2023–	Åsane	54	(16)
- * Club domestic league appearances and goals as of 1 December 2025

Steffen Lie Skålevik (born 31 January 1993) is a Norwegian football player who currently plays for Åsane. He is also known as «Skårevik».

== Career ==
=== Early years ===
Lie Skålevik grew up in Sotra outside of Bergen and climbed up the ranks of his local club, Sotra SK, before he was picked up by SK Brann's youth academy in 2012, at 19 years old. He played 36 games and scored 13 goals for SK Brann 2 in the Norwegian 2. divisjon (third tier) before leaving to Nest-Sotra in the same division.

=== Nest-Sotra ===
Lie Skålevik became an important player for the Nest-Sotra side who went on to win their division and a promotion to the Norwegian First Division. The following season in 2014 he kept impressing and played an important role in avoiding relegation, scoring 12 goals in 29 games. In 2015, he really started showing his eye for goal, scoring 10 goals in 18 matches, before he was sold to SK Brann halfways into the season.

=== SK Brann ===
On 15 August 2015, he rejoined SK Brann, replacing Marcus Pedersen who was sold to Strømsgodset two days prior.

== Career statistics ==
=== Club ===
As of match played 27 September 2025

Appearances and goals by club, season and competition
Club	Season	League			National Cup		Continental		Other		Total	
Club	Season	Division	Apps	Goals	Apps	Goals	Apps	Goals	Apps	Goals	Apps	Goals
Nest-Sotra	2013	Oddsen-ligaen	6	5	0	0	-		-		6	5
Nest-Sotra	2014	1. divisjon	29	12	2	2	-		-		31	14
Nest-Sotra	2015	OBOS-ligaen	18	10	2	0	-		-		20	10
Nest-Sotra	Total		53	27	4	2	-	-	-	-	57	29
Brann	2015	OBOS-ligaen	11	3	0	0	-		-		11	3
Brann	2016	Tippeligaen	18	6	1	0	-		-		19	6
Brann	2017	Eliteserien	8	0	3	2	2	0	1	0	14	2
Brann	2018	Eliteserien	28	9	1	0	-		-		29	9
Brann	Total		65	18	5	2	2	0	1	0	73	20
Start (loan)	2017	OBOS-ligaen	11	10	0	0	-		-		11	10
Start (loan)	Total		11	10	0	0	-	-	-	-	11	10
Sarpsborg 08	2019	Eliteserien	21	1	3	1	-		-		24	2
Sarpsborg 08	2021	Eliteserien	8	1	2	1	-		-		10	2
Sarpsborg 08	2022	Eliteserien	26	4	2	1	-		-		28	5
Sarpsborg 08	2023	Eliteserien	15	1	3	1	-		-		18	2
Sarpsborg 08	Total		70	7	10	4	-	-	-	-	80	11
Start (loan)	2020	Eliteserien	21	1	0	0	-		-		21	1
Start (loan)	Total		21	1	0	0	-	-	-	-	21	1
Sogndal (loan)	2021	OBOS-ligaen	13	3	0	0	-		-		13	3
Sogndal (loan)	Total		13	3	0	0	-	-	-	-	13	3
Åsane	2023	OBOS-ligaen	7	1	0	0	-		-		7	1
Åsane	2024	OBOS-ligaen	21	8	1	0	-		-		22	8
Åsane	2025	OBOS-ligaen	22	7	5	3	-		-		27	10
Åsane	Total		50	16	6	3	-	-	-	-	56	29
Career total			283	82	25	11	2	0	1	0	311	93
