= Mohamed El Makrini =

Dutch footballer (born 1987)

Personal information
- Date of birth: 6 July 1987 (age 39)
- Place of birth: Utrecht, Netherlands
- Height: 1.84 m (6 ft 0 in)
- Position: Midfielder

Team information
- Current team: TEC
- Number: 16

Youth career
- CDW
- Elinkwijk
- 2001–2004: Den Bosch

Senior career*
Years	Team	Apps	(Gls)
2005–2011	Den Bosch	97	(8)
2011–2015	Cambuur	122	(2)
2015–2017	OB	46	(1)
2017–2019	Roda JC	62	(1)
2019–2020	Kilmarnock	21	(2)
2020–2021	Start	22	(1)
2021–	TEC	104	(0)
- * Club domestic league appearances and goals as of 5 August 2025

Mohamed El Makrini (born 6 July 1987) is a Dutch professional footballer who plays as a midfielder for Derde Divisie club TEC.

== Career ==
Born in Utrecht, El Makrini started his youth career at SV CDW in Wijk bij Duurstede, after which he moved to USV Elinkwijk. At USV, he stood out among the scouts of FC Den Bosch, who brought him to their academy. As a youth, he mostly played in attacking midfield. After his transfer to Den Bosch, El Makrini was labeled as a big talent, which earned him a professional contract at a young age. As a result, he was invited to the Morocco national under-20 team. El Makrini played for FC Den Bosch for six seasons, in which he made more than 130 appearances, including matches in the KNVB Cup tournament, league playoffs and the league. After moving to the first team of Den Bosch, he was utilised as a right back, midfielder and right winger. In his last year at FC Den Bosch, El Makrini played mostly in defensive midfield.

In the summer of 2011, El Makrini signed a one-year contract with SC Cambuur. With the club, he won the second-tier Eerste Divisie championship in the 2012–13 season and thus achieved promotion to the Eredivisie. There, he made 32 league appearances during the 2013–14 season. His stay at Cambuur eventually lasted four seasons.

On 1 July 2015, El Makrini moved to Danish Superliga club OB, signing a two-year contract. In the Superliga, El Makrini also made an impact. In January 2017, he was signed by Dutch side Roda JC Kerkrade for a transfer fee of €150,000. In his first six months at the club, they suffered relegation from the Eredivisie. El Makrini remained in Kerkrade despite the relegation and played one season in the second tier.

On 9 July 2019, El Makrini moved to Scottish Premiership club Kilmarnock on a one-year contract. He scored his first goal for the club on 14 September 2019, in a 2–0 home win against Hibernian. A year later, El Makrini signed for Norwegian club IK Start.

== Honours ==
=== Club ===
SC Cambuur

- Eerste Divisie: 2012–13
