= Jonas Deumeland =

German footballer

Personal information
- Date of birth: 9 February 1988 (age 38)
- Place of birth: Wolfsburg, Germany
- Height: 1.91 m (6 ft 3 in)
- Position: Goalkeeper

Youth career
- 2005–2007: VfL Wolfsburg

Senior career*
Years	Team	Apps	(Gls)
2007–2008	VfL Wolfsburg	0	(0)
2008–2009	Rot-Weiß Oberhausen	0	(0)
2009–2011	VfL Wolfsburg II	34	(0)
2011–2014	Eupen	95	(0)
2016–2017	Greuther Fürth II	5	(0)
2018–2021	Start	81	(0)
- * Club domestic league appearances and goals as of 10:50, 3 April 2022 (UTC)

Jonas Deumeland (born 9 February 1988) is a German professional footballer who most recently played as a goalkeeper for Start.

== Club career ==
Deumeland started his career with VfL Wolfsburg, but did not become a regular until his three seasons in Belgian outfit K.A.S. Eupen.

Following retirement he made a comeback with SpVgg Greuther Fürth II in 2016–17. In 2018 he was signed by Norwegian club IK Start who was left with only one goalkeeper when first-choice Håkon Opdal was injured. In Deumeland's second match, he too sustained an injury.

== Career statistics ==
=== Club ===
As of match played 3 April 2022

Appearances and goals by club, season and competition
Club	Season	League			National Cup		Continental		Total	
Club	Season	Division	Apps	Goals	Apps	Goals	Apps	Goals	Apps	Goals
Eupen	2011–12	Proximus League	32	0	1	0	-		33	0
Eupen	2012–13	Proximus League	31	0	0	0	-		31	0
Eupen	2013–14	Proximus League	32	0	0	0	-		32	0
Eupen	Total		95	0	1	0	-	-	96	0
Greuther Fürth II	2016–17	Regionalliga	5	0	0	0	-		5	0
Start	2018	Eliteserien	26	0	3	0	-		29	0
Start	2019	OBOS-ligaen	28	0	0	0	-		28	0
Start	2020	Eliteserien	19	0	0	0	-		19	0
Start	2021	OBOS-ligaen	8	0	0	0	-		8	0
Start	Total		81	0	3	0	-	-	84	0
Career total			181	0	4	0	-	-	185	0
