= List of Norwegian football transfers summer 2022 =

This is a list of Norwegian football transfers in the 2022 summer transfer window by club. Only clubs of the 2022 Eliteserien and 2022 1. divisjon are included.

== Eliteserien ==
=== Aalesund ===
In: Note: Flags indicate national team as defined under FIFA eligibility rules; some limited exceptions apply. Players may hold more than one non-FIFA nationality.

| No. | Pos. | Nation | Player |
|---|---|---|---|
| 16 | DF | NOR | John Kitolano (from Odd) |
| 18 | DF | NOR | Nikolai Hopland (loan return from Kristiansund) |
| 21 | FW | NGR | Moses Ebiye (from Tromsø) |
| 23 | FW | GHA | Gilbert Koomson (on loan from Bodø/Glimt) |
| 29 | FW | NOR | Bjørn Martin Kristensen (from Grorud) |
| 30 | DF | DEN | Alexander Juel Andersen (from (Denmark) OB, previously on loan) |
| 39 | FW | NOR | Andreas Televik (from Hødd) |

Out: Note: Flags indicate national team as defined under FIFA eligibility rules; some limited exceptions apply. Players may hold more than one non-FIFA nationality.

| No. | Pos. | Nation | Player |
|---|---|---|---|
| 16 | DF | NOR | Jørgen Hatlehol (to Bryne) |
| 17 | FW | SEN | Mamadou Diaw (on loan to Bryne) |
| 18 | DF | NOR | Nikolai Hopland (on loan to Kristiansund) |
| 19 | MF | NOR | Isak Dybvik Määttä (to (Netherlands) Groningen) |
| 22 | FW | NOR | Sigurd Hauso Haugen (to (Denmark) AGF) |
| 26 | GK | NOR | Tor Erik Valderhaug Larsen (on loan to Stjørdals-Blink) |
| 34 | DF | NOR | Stian Aarønes Holte (on loan to Brattvåg) |
| 39 | FW | NOR | Andreas Televik (to Hødd) |

=== Bodø/Glimt ===
In: Note: Flags indicate national team as defined under FIFA eligibility rules; some limited exceptions apply. Players may hold more than one non-FIFA nationality.

| No. | Pos. | Nation | Player |
|---|---|---|---|
| 1 | GK | NOR | Julian Faye Lund (from Rosenborg) |
| 8 | MF | DEN | Albert Grønbæk (from (Denmark) AGF) |
| 21 | MF | CZE | Lucas Kubr (from (Belgium) Sint-Truiden U20) |
| 22 | DF | NOR | Marius Lode (from (Germany) Schalke 04) |
| 26 | DF | NOR | Sigurd Kvile (loan return from Kristiansund) |
| 29 | MF | SLO | Nino Žugelj (from (Slovenia) Maribor) |
| 77 | MF | NOR | Patrick Berg (from (France) Lens) |
| 88 | FW | NOR | Lars-Jørgen Salvesen (from Strømsgodset) |

Out: Note: Flags indicate national team as defined under FIFA eligibility rules; some limited exceptions apply. Players may hold more than one non-FIFA nationality.

| No. | Pos. | Nation | Player |
|---|---|---|---|
| 8 | FW | NGR | Victor Boniface (to (Belgium) Union SG) |
| 17 | FW | TUN | Sebastian Tounekti (to Haugesund, previously on loan at (Netherlands) Groningen) |
| 22 | GK | NED | Joshua Smits (to (Netherlands) Willem II) |
| 24 | FW | NOR | Lasse Selvåg Nordås (on loan to Tromsø) |
| 26 | DF | NOR | Sigurd Kvile (on loan to Kristiansund (second time)) |
| 33 | FW | NOR | Mads Fagerli Halsøy (to Junkeren) |
| 37 | MF | NOR | Ask Tjærandsen-Skau (on loan to Jerv) |
| 77 | FW | GHA | Gilbert Koomson (on loan to Aalesund) |

=== HamKam ===
In: Note: Flags indicate national team as defined under FIFA eligibility rules; some limited exceptions apply. Players may hold more than one non-FIFA nationality.

| No. | Pos. | Nation | Player |
|---|---|---|---|
| 17 | FW | DEN | Victor Lind (on loan from (Denmark) Midtjylland) |
| 18 | MF | NOR | Enok Naustdal (from Florø) |
| 19 | FW | NOR | Marcus Pedersen (free transfer) |
| 91 | MF | NGR | Rilwan Hassan (from (Denmark) SønderjyskE) |

Out: Note: Flags indicate national team as defined under FIFA eligibility rules; some limited exceptions apply. Players may hold more than one non-FIFA nationality.

| No. | Pos. | Nation | Player |
|---|---|---|---|
| 6 | MF | NOR | Kristian Eriksen (to Molde) |
| 17 | FW | NGR | Jibril Antala Abubakar (released) |
| 19 | MF | DEN | Oliver Sørensen (loan return to (Denmark) FC Midtjylland) |

=== Haugesund ===
In: Note: Flags indicate national team as defined under FIFA eligibility rules; some limited exceptions apply. Players may hold more than one non-FIFA nationality.

| No. | Pos. | Nation | Player |
|---|---|---|---|
| 6 | MF | DEN | Magnus Christensen (from (Denmark) AaB) |
| 11 | FW | TUN | Sebastian Tounekti (from Bodø/Glimt) |
| 26 | MF | CPV | Bruno Leite (from (Cyprus) Pafos) |

Out: Note: Flags indicate national team as defined under FIFA eligibility rules; some limited exceptions apply. Players may hold more than one non-FIFA nationality.

| No. | Pos. | Nation | Player |
|---|---|---|---|
| 11 | FW | NOR | Joacim Holtan (on loan to Start) |
| 20 | MF | NOR | Torje Naustdal (on loan to Grorud) |
| 25 | FW | SEN | Alioune Ndour (to (Belgium) Zulte Waregem) |
| 39 | MF | NOR | Mathias Tjoland (on loan to Åkra) |

=== Jerv ===
In: Note: Flags indicate national team as defined under FIFA eligibility rules; some limited exceptions apply. Players may hold more than one non-FIFA nationality.

| No. | Pos. | Nation | Player |
|---|---|---|---|
| 4 | DF | CAF | Dylan Mboumbouni (from (France) Cholet) |
| 21 | MF | NOR | Ask Tjærandsen-Skau (on loan from Bodø/Glimt) |
| 22 | DF | NOR | Henrik Bredeli (from Grorud) |
| 25 | MF | FIN | Daniel Håkans (on loan from (Finland) SJK) |
| 30 | MF | NED | Jeremy Cijntje (from (Netherlands) Den Bosch) |
| 71 | FW | LBR | Peter Wilson (from (Cyprus) Olympiakos Nicosia) |

Out: Note: Flags indicate national team as defined under FIFA eligibility rules; some limited exceptions apply. Players may hold more than one non-FIFA nationality.

| No. | Pos. | Nation | Player |
|---|---|---|---|
| 3 | DF | DEN | Daniel Arrocha (to Mjøndalen) |
| 4 | DF | NOR | Kristian Novak (to (Sweden) Östersund) |
| 30 | GK | NOR | Andreas Olsvoll (on loan to Ullern) |
| 58 | FW | DEN | Aral Şimşir (loan return to (Denmark) Midtjylland) |
| 77 | FW | NED | Rodney Antwi (loan return to (Ukraine) Inhulets Petrove) |

=== Kristiansund ===
In: Note: Flags indicate national team as defined under FIFA eligibility rules; some limited exceptions apply. Players may hold more than one non-FIFA nationality.

| No. | Pos. | Nation | Player |
|---|---|---|---|
| 4 | DF | NOR | Henrik Gjesdal (from Start) |
| 16 | DF | NOR | Sigurd Kvile (on loan from Bodø/Glimt (second time)) |
| 27 | FW | NOR | Pawel Chrupalla (on loan from Rosenborg) |
| 29 | FW | CMR | Faris Pemi Moumbagna (loan return from (Denmark) SønderjyskE) |
| 32 | DF | NOR | Marius Alm (free transfer) |
| 34 | DF | NOR | Nikolai Hopland (on loan from Aalesund) |
| 37 | FW | NOR | Oskar Sivertsen (loan return from Hødd) |

Out: Note: Flags indicate national team as defined under FIFA eligibility rules; some limited exceptions apply. Players may hold more than one non-FIFA nationality.

| No. | Pos. | Nation | Player |
|---|---|---|---|
| 9 | MF | DEN | Agon Muçolli (to (Denmark) Odense) |
| 16 | DF | NOR | Sigurd Kvile (loan return to Bodø/Glimt) |
| 22 | DF | NOR | Martin Sjølstad (on loan to Kongsvinger) |
| 32 | DF | NOR | Marius Alm (to Hødd) |
| 34 | DF | NOR | Nikolai Hopland (loan return to Aalesund) |
| 39 | MF | NOR | Heine Gikling Bruset (on loan to Levanger) |

=== Lillestrøm ===
In: Note: Flags indicate national team as defined under FIFA eligibility rules; some limited exceptions apply. Players may hold more than one non-FIFA nationality.

| No. | Pos. | Nation | Player |
|---|---|---|---|
| 10 | FW | NOR | Thomas Lehne Olsen (from (United Arab Emirates) Shabab Al Ahli) |
| 16 | MF | NOR | Marius Lundemo (from (Cyprus) APOEL) |
| 17 | MF | NOR | Elias Solberg (from (Italy) Juventus Primavera) |
| 22 | DF | NOR | Philip Slørdahl (loan return from Sandefjord) |
| 27 | DF | CIV | Ibrahim Cissé (on loan from (Ivory Coast) Zoman) |
| 58 | FW | DEN | Aral Şimşir (on loan from (Denmark) Midtjylland) |

Out: Note: Flags indicate national team as defined under FIFA eligibility rules; some limited exceptions apply. Players may hold more than one non-FIFA nationality.

| No. | Pos. | Nation | Player |
|---|---|---|---|
| 11 | MF | NOR | Tobias Hammer Svendsen (hiatus) |
| 15 | MF | GHA | Eric Taylor (loan return to (Ghana) New Life Academy) |
| 17 | FW | NOR | Jonatan Braut Brunes (to Strømsgodset, previously on loan at Start) |
| 22 | DF | NOR | Philip Slørdahl (on loan to Sogndal) |

=== Molde ===
In: Note: Flags indicate national team as defined under FIFA eligibility rules; some limited exceptions apply. Players may hold more than one non-FIFA nationality.

| No. | Pos. | Nation | Player |
|---|---|---|---|
| 12 | GK | BEL | Álex Craninx (loan return from (Belgium) Seraing) |
| 20 | MF | NOR | Kristian Eriksen (from HamKam) |

Out: Note: Flags indicate national team as defined under FIFA eligibility rules; some limited exceptions apply. Players may hold more than one non-FIFA nationality.

| No. | Pos. | Nation | Player |

=== Odd ===
In: Note: Flags indicate national team as defined under FIFA eligibility rules; some limited exceptions apply. Players may hold more than one non-FIFA nationality.

| No. | Pos. | Nation | Player |
|---|---|---|---|
| 10 | FW | NOR | Adama Diomande (from (Qatar) Al-Arabi) |
| 13 | DF | NOR | Kevin Egell-Johnsen (loan return from Kongsvinger) |
| 16 | MF | NOR | Vebjørn Hoff (on loan from Rosenborg) |
| 20 | MF | NOR | Thomas Rekdal (from (Germany) VfB Stuttgart II) |
| 25 | FW | AUT | Philipp Zulechner (from (Germany) Hallescher FC) |
| 30 | GK | NOR | Peder Nygaard Klausen (promoted from junior squad) |

Out: Note: Flags indicate national team as defined under FIFA eligibility rules; some limited exceptions apply. Players may hold more than one non-FIFA nationality.

| No. | Pos. | Nation | Player |
|---|---|---|---|
| 1 | GK | NOR | Sondre Rossbach (on loan to Vålerenga) |
| 10 | FW | NGR | Onyekachi Hope Ugwuadu (to Pors) |
| 16 | MF | NOR | Joshua Kitolano (to (Netherlands) Sparta Rotterdam) |
| 20 | FW | NOR | Tobias Lauritsen (to (Netherlands) Sparta Rotterdam) |
| 25 | DF | NOR | John Kitolano (to Aalesund) |

=== Rosenborg ===
In: Note: Flags indicate national team as defined under FIFA eligibility rules; some limited exceptions apply. Players may hold more than one non-FIFA nationality.

| No. | Pos. | Nation | Player |
|---|---|---|---|
| 16 | DF | NOR | Håkon Røsten (promoted from junior squad) |
| 17 | FW | DEN | Casper Tengstedt (from (Denmark) Horsens) |
| 32 | DF | NOR | Leo Cornic (from (Sweden) Djurgården) |
| 40 | FW | NOR | Pawel Chrupalla (promoted from junior squad) |
| 44 | FW | NOR | Magnus Holte (promoted from junior squad) |
| 80 | FW | ISL | Kristall Máni Ingason (from (Iceland) Víkingur) |

Out: Note: Flags indicate national team as defined under FIFA eligibility rules; some limited exceptions apply. Players may hold more than one non-FIFA nationality.

| No. | Pos. | Nation | Player |
|---|---|---|---|
| 4 | MF | NOR | Vebjørn Hoff (on loan to Odd) |
| 9 | FW | NOR | Noah Holm (on loan to (France) Reims) |
| 13 | GK | NOR | Julian Faye Lund (to Bodø/Glimt) |
| 14 | FW | SWE | Rasmus Wiedesheim-Paul (on loan to (Sweden) Helsingborg, previously on loan at (Sweden) Mjällby) |
| 23 | MF | SWE | Pavle Vagić (to (Sweden) Hammarby) |
| 25 | DF | SWE | Adam Andersson (on loan to (Denmark) Randers) |
| 35 | FW | NOR | Emil Ceïde (to (Italy) Sassuolo, previously on loan) |
| 38 | DF | NOR | Mikkel Ceïde (on loan to Tromsø, previously on loan at (Sweden) Utsikten) |
| 40 | FW | NOR | Pawel Chrupalla (on loan to Kristiansund) |

=== Sandefjord ===
In: Note: Flags indicate national team as defined under FIFA eligibility rules; some limited exceptions apply. Players may hold more than one non-FIFA nationality.

| No. | Pos. | Nation | Player |
|---|---|---|---|
| 5 | MF | SWE | Aleksander Damnjanovic Nilsson (from (Sweden) Malmö, previously on loan) |
| 18 | DF | NOR | Fredrik Pålerud (from Sandnes Ulf) |
| 21 | DF | NOR | Fredrik Flo (from Øygarden) |
| 22 | MF | GEQ | Federico Bikoro (from (Spain) Real Zaragoza) |
| 27 | MF | SWE | Albin Winbo (on loan from (Sweden) Varberg) |
| 28 | MF | ESP | Rufo (from (Denmark) AaB) |
| 29 | FW | NOR | Wally Njie (from Flint) |

Out: Note: Flags indicate national team as defined under FIFA eligibility rules; some limited exceptions apply. Players may hold more than one non-FIFA nationality.

| No. | Pos. | Nation | Player |
|---|---|---|---|
| 21 | DF | NOR | Philip Slørdahl (loan return to Lillestrøm) |

=== Sarpsborg 08 ===
In: Note: Flags indicate national team as defined under FIFA eligibility rules; some limited exceptions apply. Players may hold more than one non-FIFA nationality.

| No. | Pos. | Nation | Player |
|---|---|---|---|
| 2 | DF | NOR | Elias Kringberg Haug (promoted from junior squad) |
| 10 | FW | MLI | Aboubacar Konté (loan return from (Portugal) Nacional) |
| 11 | MF | SWE | Simon Tibbling (from (Denmark) Randers) |
| 13 | DF | DEN | Anders Hagelskjær (from (Denmark) AaB) |
| 23 | FW | DEN | Gustav Mogensen (from (England) Brentford) |
| 29 | MF | DEN | Victor Torp (from (Denmark) Midtjylland) |
| 72 | MF | NOR | Sander Christiansen (from (Germany) Borussia Mönchengladbach II) |
| 74 | FW | NOR | Aridon Racaj (promoted from junior squad) |

Out: Note: Flags indicate national team as defined under FIFA eligibility rules; some limited exceptions apply. Players may hold more than one non-FIFA nationality.

| No. | Pos. | Nation | Player |
|---|---|---|---|
| 2 | DF | NOR | Leo Bech Hermansen (to Kjelsås) |
| 10 | FW | FRA | Rashad Muhammed (to (Turkey) Ankara Keçiörengücü) |
| 11 | MF | NOR | Jonathan Lindseth (to (Bulgaria) CSKA Sofia) |
| 14 | MF | MLI | Amadou Camara (on loan to (Senegal) Oslo FA) |
| 19 | MF | SEN | Laurent Mendy (on loan to (Senegal) Oslo FA) |
| – | MF | ISL | Emil Pálsson (retired) |

=== Strømsgodset ===
In: Note: Flags indicate national team as defined under FIFA eligibility rules; some limited exceptions apply. Players may hold more than one non-FIFA nationality.

| No. | Pos. | Nation | Player |
|---|---|---|---|
| 19 | FW | NOR | Jonatan Braut Brunes (from Lillestrøm) |
| 20 | MF | GHA | Emmanuel Danso (from (France) Lyon II) |
| 66 | FW | NOR | Albert Palmberg Thoresen (promoted from junior squad) |

Out: Note: Flags indicate national team as defined under FIFA eligibility rules; some limited exceptions apply. Players may hold more than one non-FIFA nationality.

| No. | Pos. | Nation | Player |
|---|---|---|---|
| 88 | FW | NOR | Lars-Jørgen Salvesen (to Bodø/Glimt) |

=== Tromsø ===
In: Note: Flags indicate national team as defined under FIFA eligibility rules; some limited exceptions apply. Players may hold more than one non-FIFA nationality.

| No. | Pos. | Nation | Player |
|---|---|---|---|
| 6 | DF | NOR | Mikkel Ceïde (on loan from Rosenborg) |
| 9 | FW | NOR | Lasse Selvåg Nordås (on loan from Bodø/Glimt) |
| 18 | FW | NOR | Elias Aarflot (from Grorud) |
| 21 | FW | NOR | Tobias Hafstad (loan return from Arendal) |

Out: Note: Flags indicate national team as defined under FIFA eligibility rules; some limited exceptions apply. Players may hold more than one non-FIFA nationality.

| No. | Pos. | Nation | Player |
|---|---|---|---|
| 9 | FW | NGR | Moses Ebiye (to Aalesund) |
| 21 | FW | NOR | Tobias Hafstad (on loan to Arendal) |
| 60 | FW | USA | Zyen Jones (loan return to (Hungary) Ferencváros) |
| — | MF | NOR | Tomas Stabell (released) |

=== Viking ===
In: Note: Flags indicate national team as defined under FIFA eligibility rules; some limited exceptions apply. Players may hold more than one non-FIFA nationality.

| No. | Pos. | Nation | Player |
|---|---|---|---|
| 2 | DF | NOR | Herman Haugen (loan return from Raufoss) |
| 5 | DF | SEN | Djibril Diop (from (Morocco) Hassania Agadir) |
| 12 | MF | FIN | Naatan Skyttä (on loan from (France) Toulouse) |
| 29 | FW | NOR | Sander Svendsen (from (Denmark) OB) |
| 35 | FW | NOR | Edvin Austbø (promoted from junior squad) |

Out: Note: Flags indicate national team as defined under FIFA eligibility rules; some limited exceptions apply. Players may hold more than one non-FIFA nationality.

| No. | Pos. | Nation | Player |
|---|---|---|---|
| 14 | FW | NOR | Veton Berisha (to (Sweden) Hammarby) |
| 17 | DF | NOR | Sebastian Sebulonsen (to (Denmark) Brøndby) |
| 26 | FW | NOR | Simen Kvia-Egeskog (on loan to Skeid) |
| 27 | FW | ISL | Samúel Friðjónsson (to (Greece) Atromitos) |

=== Vålerenga ===
In: Note: Flags indicate national team as defined under FIFA eligibility rules; some limited exceptions apply. Players may hold more than one non-FIFA nationality.

| No. | Pos. | Nation | Player |
|---|---|---|---|
| 1 | GK | NOR | Per Kristian Bråtveit (from (Sweden) Djurgården) |
| 1 | GK | NOR | Sondre Rossbach (on loan from Odd) |
| 9 | FW | NOR | Torgeir Børven (from (Turkey) Gaziantep) |
| 31 | DF | NOR | Alexander Hammer Kjelsen (promoted from junior squad) |
| 32 | DF | NOR | Max Bjurstrøm (promoted from junior squad) |
| 33 | MF | NOR | Jones El-Abdellaoui (promoted from junior squad) |
| 44 | DF | NOR | Stefan Strandberg (from (Italy) Salernitana) |

Out: Note: Flags indicate national team as defined under FIFA eligibility rules; some limited exceptions apply. Players may hold more than one non-FIFA nationality.

| No. | Pos. | Nation | Player |
|---|---|---|---|
| 1 | GK | NOR | Kjetil Haug (to (France) Toulouse) |
| 1 | GK | NOR | Per Kristian Bråtveit (to (Denmark) AGF) |
| 3 | DF | NOR | Brage Skaret (to Fredrikstad) |
| 9 | FW | ISL | Viðar Örn Kjartansson (to (Greece) Atromitos) |
| 10 | MF | SWE | Albin Mörfelt (to (Sweden) Degerfors, previously on loan at (Sweden) Mjällby) |
| 18 | FW | NGR | Taofeek Ismaheel (loan return to (France) Lorient) |
| 22 | DF | NOR | Ivan Näsberg (to (Greece) PAOK) |
| 26 | FW | NOR | Aron Dønnum (loan return to (Belgium) Standard Liège) |

== 1. divisjon ==
=== Brann ===
In: Note: Flags indicate national team as defined under FIFA eligibility rules; some limited exceptions apply. Players may hold more than one non-FIFA nationality.

| No. | Pos. | Nation | Player |
|---|---|---|---|
| 32 | FW | NOR | Jonas Torsvik (promoted from junior squad) |

Out: Note: Flags indicate national team as defined under FIFA eligibility rules; some limited exceptions apply. Players may hold more than one non-FIFA nationality.

| No. | Pos. | Nation | Player |
|---|---|---|---|
| 17 | FW | NOR | Filip Møller Delaveris (on loan to KFUM) |

=== Bryne ===
In: Note: Flags indicate national team as defined under FIFA eligibility rules; some limited exceptions apply. Players may hold more than one non-FIFA nationality.

| No. | Pos. | Nation | Player |
|---|---|---|---|
| 8 | FW | SEN | Mamadou Diaw (on loan from Aalesund) |
| 15 | DF | NOR | Jørgen Hatlehol (from Aalesund) |
| 22 | DF | NOR | Marius Mattingsdal (promoted from junior squad) |
| 24 | DF | NOR | Jens Husebø (from Ull/Kisa) |
| 26 | DF | NOR | Axel Kryger (from Sogndal) |

Out: Note: Flags indicate national team as defined under FIFA eligibility rules; some limited exceptions apply. Players may hold more than one non-FIFA nationality.

| No. | Pos. | Nation | Player |
|---|---|---|---|
| 1 | GK | NOR | Sondre Vestbø Kyllingstad (released, previously on loan at Sola) |
| 4 | DF | NOR | Marius Andersen (on loan to Egersund) |
| 8 | MF | NOR | Sixten Dalen Jensen (to Vard) |
| 14 | DF | SWE | Daniel Hermansson (on loan to (Sweden) J-Södra) |
| 19 | DF | NOR | Tobias Guddal (on loan to Notodden) |
| 21 | FW | NOR | Ingmar Orkelbog Austberg (on loan to Kolstad) |
| 90 | FW | NOR | Albert Braut Tjåland (loan return to Molde 2) |

=== Fredrikstad ===
In: Note: Flags indicate national team as defined under FIFA eligibility rules; some limited exceptions apply. Players may hold more than one non-FIFA nationality.

| No. | Pos. | Nation | Player |
|---|---|---|---|
| 3 | DF | NOR | Brage Skaret (from Vålerenga) |
| 23 | MF | NOR | Mikail Maden (from (Germany) Schalke 04 II) |
| 29 | FW | SWE | Lucas Lima (from (Sweden) Norrköping) |
| 33 | MF | NOR | Filip Stensland (promoted from junior squad) |

Out: Note: Flags indicate national team as defined under FIFA eligibility rules; some limited exceptions apply. Players may hold more than one non-FIFA nationality.

| No. | Pos. | Nation | Player |
|---|---|---|---|
| 5 | MF | NOR | Adnan Hadzic (to (Denmark) SønderjyskE) |
| 12 | FW | SWE | Love Reuterswärd (to Mjøndalen) |
| 23 | DF | NOR | Ayoub Aleesami (to KFUM) |
| 29 | MF | NOR | Kasander Getz (to Ullern, previously on loan) |

=== Grorud ===
In: Note: Flags indicate national team as defined under FIFA eligibility rules; some limited exceptions apply. Players may hold more than one non-FIFA nationality.

| No. | Pos. | Nation | Player |
|---|---|---|---|
| 6 | MF | NOR | Torje Naustdal (on loan from Haugesund) |
| 12 | GK | NOR | Magnus Stær-Jensen (promoted from junior squad) |
| 13 | FW | NOR | Mikal Kvinge (on loan from Brann 2) |
| 19 | FW | NGR | Peter Godly Michael (from Sogndal) |
| 26 | MF | NOR | Magnus Strandman Lundal (free transfer) |
| 29 | DF | NOR | Kristoffer Lassen Harrison (on loan from Stabæk) |
| 45 | GK | NOR | Vegard Storsve (loan return from Asker) |
| 46 | MF | NOR | Casper Myhren Fjeld (promoted from junior squad) |
| 47 | MF | NOR | Tollef Kvello Etholm (promoted from junior squad) |
| 48 | MF | NOR | Elias Aarflot (promoted from junior squad) |

Out: Note: Flags indicate national team as defined under FIFA eligibility rules; some limited exceptions apply. Players may hold more than one non-FIFA nationality.

| No. | Pos. | Nation | Player |
|---|---|---|---|
| 11 | MF | NOR | Kevin Mankowitz (retired) |
| 13 | FW | NOR | Mikal Kvinge (loan return to Brann 2) |
| 22 | DF | NOR | Henrik Bredeli (to Jerv) |
| 29 | FW | NOR | Bjørn Martin Kristensen (to Aalesund) |
| 45 | GK | NOR | Vegard Storsve (on loan to Asker) |
| 48 | FW | NOR | Elias Aarflot (to Tromsø) |

=== KFUM ===
In: Note: Flags indicate national team as defined under FIFA eligibility rules; some limited exceptions apply. Players may hold more than one non-FIFA nationality.

| No. | Pos. | Nation | Player |
|---|---|---|---|
| 15 | DF | NOR | Mathias Tønnessen (promoted from junior squad) |
| 20 | DF | NOR | Ayoub Aleesami (from Fredrikstad) |
| 26 | DF | NOR | Joachim Prent-Eckbo (from Nordstrand) |
| 29 | FW | NOR | Filip Møller Delaveris (on loan from Brann) |

Out: Note: Flags indicate national team as defined under FIFA eligibility rules; some limited exceptions apply. Players may hold more than one non-FIFA nationality.

| No. | Pos. | Nation | Player |
|---|---|---|---|
| 9 | FW | NOR | Fredrik Brustad (retired) |
| 13 | GK | NOR | Jonathan Ward Ådlandsvik (to Lyn) |

=== Kongsvinger ===
In: Note: Flags indicate national team as defined under FIFA eligibility rules; some limited exceptions apply. Players may hold more than one non-FIFA nationality.

| No. | Pos. | Nation | Player |
|---|---|---|---|
| 7 | MF | GHA | Eric Taylor (on loan from (Ghana) New Life Academy) |
| 12 | GK | NOR | Isak Midttun Solberg (from (England) Tottenham U23) |
| 27 | DF | NOR | Martin Sjølstad (on loan from Kristiansund) |
| 30 | GK | SVK | Peter Rusina (free transfer) |
| 32 | FW | NOR | Nikolai Ronaldo Bull Jørgensen (promoted from junior squad) |
| 67 | MF | NOR | Jan Marius Høiby (promoted from junior squad) |

Out: Note: Flags indicate national team as defined under FIFA eligibility rules; some limited exceptions apply. Players may hold more than one non-FIFA nationality.

| No. | Pos. | Nation | Player |
|---|---|---|---|
| 7 | MF | NOR | Mahmoud Laham (to Fram) |
| 11 | MF | NOR | Sander Marthinussen (on loan to Arendal) |
| 16 | DF | NOR | Per-Magnus Steiring (to Skeid) |
| 20 | MF | NOR | Jesper Grundt (on loan to Moss) |
| 25 | DF | NOR | Kevin Egell-Johnsen (loan return to Odd) |
| 31 | GK | NOR | Andreas Smedplass (on loan to Vard) |

=== Mjøndalen ===
In: Note: Flags indicate national team as defined under FIFA eligibility rules; some limited exceptions apply. Players may hold more than one non-FIFA nationality.

| No. | Pos. | Nation | Player |
|---|---|---|---|
| 3 | DF | DEN | Daniel Arrocha (from Jerv) |
| 12 | FW | SWE | Love Reuterswärd (from Fredrikstad) |
| 20 | FW | NOR | Kristian Strømland Lien (from Fløy) |
| 21 | DF | NOR | Sondre Skogen (from (Netherlands) Jong Feyenoord) |
| 38 | MF | NOR | Sondre Granaas (promoted from junior squad) |

Out: Note: Flags indicate national team as defined under FIFA eligibility rules; some limited exceptions apply. Players may hold more than one non-FIFA nationality.

| No. | Pos. | Nation | Player |
|---|---|---|---|
| 3 | DF | KOS | Leotrim Bekteshi (to (Kosovo) Ballkani) |
| 12 | DF | NOR | Markus Nakkim (to Hamkam) |
| 14 | MF | NCA | Matias Belli Moldskred (to Sandnes Ulf) |
| 19 | FW | NOR | Magnus Bækken (on loan to Notodden) |
| 20 | MF | GHA | Isaac Twum (to Sogndal) |
| 21 | DF | NOR | Herman Kleppa (to Sandnes Ulf) |
| 27 | FW | NOR | Frank Bamenye (on loan to Ørn Horten) |
| 30 | FW | NOR | Kent Håvard Eriksen (retired) |

=== Ranheim ===
In: Note: Flags indicate national team as defined under FIFA eligibility rules; some limited exceptions apply. Players may hold more than one non-FIFA nationality.

| No. | Pos. | Nation | Player |
|---|---|---|---|
| 18 | DF | NOR | Brage Kvithyld (from Kolstad) |
| 19 | FW | NOR | Sondre Stokke (from Stjørdals-Blink) |
| 20 | MF | NOR | Jonas Sørensen Selnæs (from Kolstad) |

Out: Note: Flags indicate national team as defined under FIFA eligibility rules; some limited exceptions apply. Players may hold more than one non-FIFA nationality.

| No. | Pos. | Nation | Player |

=== Raufoss ===
In: Note: Flags indicate national team as defined under FIFA eligibility rules; some limited exceptions apply. Players may hold more than one non-FIFA nationality.

| No. | Pos. | Nation | Player |
|---|---|---|---|
| 2 | DF | NOR | Trygve Løberg (loan return from Gjøvik-Lyn) |
| 14 | MF | NOR | Tobias Flem (from Brattvåg) |
| 30 | MF | NOR | Kristoffer Sørensen (from Bærum) |

Out: Note: Flags indicate national team as defined under FIFA eligibility rules; some limited exceptions apply. Players may hold more than one non-FIFA nationality.

| No. | Pos. | Nation | Player |
|---|---|---|---|
| 9 | FW | NOR | Andreas Helmersen (on loan to Hødd) |
| 14 | FW | NOR | Sander Werni (to Stjørdals-Blink) |
| 15 | FW | NOR | Markus Myre Aanesland (to Sandnes Ulf) |
| 18 | MF | NOR | Even Bydal (to Lyn) |
| 24 | FW | FIN | Enoch Banza (on loan to (Finland) JäPS, previously on loan at (Finland) AC Oulu) |
| 27 | DF | NOR | Herman Haugen (loan return to Viking) |

=== Sandnes Ulf ===
In: Note: Flags indicate national team as defined under FIFA eligibility rules; some limited exceptions apply. Players may hold more than one non-FIFA nationality.

| No. | Pos. | Nation | Player |
|---|---|---|---|
| 2 | DF | NOR | Herman Kleppa (from Mjøndalen) |
| 7 | FW | NOR | Markus Myre Aanesland (from Raufoss) |
| 8 | MF | NCA | Matias Belli Moldskred (from Mjøndalen) |
| 16 | MF | NOR | Arne Ravndal (from Gjøvik-Lyn) |

Out: Note: Flags indicate national team as defined under FIFA eligibility rules; some limited exceptions apply. Players may hold more than one non-FIFA nationality.

| No. | Pos. | Nation | Player |
|---|---|---|---|
| 2 | DF | NOR | Fredrik Pålerud (to Sandefjord) |
| 15 | DF | NOR | Ståle Steen Sæthre (to (Finland) HIFK) |
| 16 | MF | NGR | Maxwell Effiom (to Skeid) |

=== Skeid ===
In: Note: Flags indicate national team as defined under FIFA eligibility rules; some limited exceptions apply. Players may hold more than one non-FIFA nationality.

| No. | Pos. | Nation | Player |
|---|---|---|---|
| 12 | GK | ISL | Palmi Arinbjörnsson (on loan from (England) Wolves U19) |
| 14 | DF | NOR | Per-Magnus Steiring (from Kongsvinger) |
| 16 | MF | NGR | Maxwell Effiom (from Sandnes Ulf) |
| 18 | MF | KOS | Florind Lokaj (promoted from junior squad) |
| 26 | MF | NOR | Emil Tjøstheim (promoted from junior squad) |
| 30 | GK | NOR | Kasper Lunde Ofstad (promoted from junior squad) |
| 33 | FW | NOR | Kristoffer Hoven (on loan from Sogndal) |
| 35 | DF | NOR | Ousmane Diallo Toure (promoted from junior squad) |
| 44 | FW | NOR | Simen Kvia-Egeskog (on loan from Viking) |

Out: Note: Flags indicate national team as defined under FIFA eligibility rules; some limited exceptions apply. Players may hold more than one non-FIFA nationality.

| No. | Pos. | Nation | Player |
|---|---|---|---|
| 3 | DF | NOR | Mikkel Tveiten (to Lyn) |
| 12 | GK | NOR | Anders Gundersen (to Nardo) |
| 14 | FW | NOR | Gabriel Andersen (to Egersund) |
| 33 | DF | NOR | Tomas Borgersen (to Ullern) |

=== Sogndal ===
In: Note: Flags indicate national team as defined under FIFA eligibility rules; some limited exceptions apply. Players may hold more than one non-FIFA nationality.

| No. | Pos. | Nation | Player |
|---|---|---|---|
| 20 | MF | GHA | Isaac Twum (from Mjøndalen) |
| 22 | DF | NOR | Philip Slørdahl (on loan from Lillestrøm) |
| 99 | FW | MEX | Alejandro Díaz (from (Canada) Pacific) |

Out: Note: Flags indicate national team as defined under FIFA eligibility rules; some limited exceptions apply. Players may hold more than one non-FIFA nationality.

| No. | Pos. | Nation | Player |
|---|---|---|---|
| 6 | DF | NOR | Axel Kryger (to Bryne) |
| 14 | FW | NGR | Peter Godly Michael (to Grorud) |
| 17 | MF | NOR | Mathias Blårud (to Ull/Kisa) |
| 18 | FW | NOR | Kristoffer Hoven (on loan to Skeid) |

=== Stabæk ===
In: Note: Flags indicate national team as defined under FIFA eligibility rules; some limited exceptions apply. Players may hold more than one non-FIFA nationality.

| No. | Pos. | Nation | Player |
|---|---|---|---|
| 9 | FW | SWE | Adam Kaied (on loan from Helsingborg) |
| 16 | FW | NGR | Gift Emmanuel Orban (from (Nigeria) Bison, previously on loan) |
| 22 | DF | NOR | Peder Vogt (loan return from Asker) |
| 27 | MF | CIV | Diabagate Mohamed Junior (on loan from (Ivory Coast) Issia Wazy) |
| 36 | DF | NOR | Marcus Seim-Monsen (promoted from junior squad) |

Out: Note: Flags indicate national team as defined under FIFA eligibility rules; some limited exceptions apply. Players may hold more than one non-FIFA nationality.

| No. | Pos. | Nation | Player |
|---|---|---|---|
| 6 | MF | CIV | Luc Kassi (released) |
| 23 | FW | NOR | Oliver Valaker Edvardsen (to (Netherlands) Go Ahead Eagles) |
| – | DF | NOR | Kristoffer Lassen Harrison (on loan to Grorud, previously on loan at Kjelsås) |

=== Start ===
In: Note: Flags indicate national team as defined under FIFA eligibility rules; some limited exceptions apply. Players may hold more than one non-FIFA nationality.

| No. | Pos. | Nation | Player |
|---|---|---|---|
| 9 | FW | SWE | Zakaria Sawo (from (Sweden) Oskarshamn) |
| 16 | MF | SWE | Tom Strannegård (on loan from (Sweden) AIK) |
| 24 | DF | NOR | Jesper Gravdahl (promoted from junior squad) |
| 44 | FW | SWE | Salim Nkubiri (on loan from (Sweden) AIK U19) |
| 88 | FW | NOR | Joacim Holtan (on loan from Haugesund) |

Out: Note: Flags indicate national team as defined under FIFA eligibility rules; some limited exceptions apply. Players may hold more than one non-FIFA nationality.

| No. | Pos. | Nation | Player |
|---|---|---|---|
| 3 | DF | NOR | Vegard Bergan (to Arendal) |
| 8 | MF | NOR | Kristoffer Valsvik (to Åsane) |
| 9 | FW | NOR | Jonatan Braut Brunes (loan return to Lillestrøm) |
| 16 | FW | SWE | Oskar Fallenius (loan return to (Denmark) Brøndby) |
| 25 | DF | NOR | Henrik Gjesdal (to Kristiansund) |

=== Stjørdals-Blink ===
In: Note: Flags indicate national team as defined under FIFA eligibility rules; some limited exceptions apply. Players may hold more than one non-FIFA nationality.

| No. | Pos. | Nation | Player |
|---|---|---|---|
| 1 | GK | SWE | Jonatan Johansson (free transfer) |
| 18 | DF | NOR | Lars Valderhaug (from Byåsen) |
| 19 | DF | NOR | Jesper T. Tromsdal (promoted from junior squad) |
| 25 | MF | SWE | Siavash Jamehdar (from (Sweden) Piteå) |
| 27 | FW | NOR | Sander Werni (from Raufoss) |
| 33 | GK | NOR | Tor Erik Valderhaug Larsen (on loan from Aalesund) |

Out: Note: Flags indicate national team as defined under FIFA eligibility rules; some limited exceptions apply. Players may hold more than one non-FIFA nationality.

| No. | Pos. | Nation | Player |
|---|---|---|---|
| 2 | DF | NOR | Madhusan Sandrakumar (to Moss) |
| 10 | FW | NOR | Sondre Stokke (to Ranheim) |
| 11 | MF | NOR | Joachim Olufsen (on loan to Rana) |
| 18 | DF | NOR | Håvard Lorentsen (to Levanger) |
| 24 | DF | NOR | Aleksander Foosnæs (released) |
| 27 | FW | NOR | Johann Hoseth Kosberg (to Ull/Kisa) |
| 29 | DF | GAM | Robin Bjørnholm-Jatta (released) |

=== Åsane ===
In: Note: Flags indicate national team as defined under FIFA eligibility rules; some limited exceptions apply. Players may hold more than one non-FIFA nationality.

| No. | Pos. | Nation | Player |
|---|---|---|---|
| 8 | MF | NOR | Kristoffer Valsvik (from Start) |
| 14 | DF | NOR | Knut Spangelo Haga (from Øygarden) |
| 22 | DF | NOR | Håkon Sjåtil (from Lyn) |
| 23 | MF | NOR | Lars Kilen (from Sotra) |

Out: Note: Flags indicate national team as defined under FIFA eligibility rules; some limited exceptions apply. Players may hold more than one non-FIFA nationality.

| No. | Pos. | Nation | Player |
|---|---|---|---|
| 13 | GK | NOR | Thomas Hille (released) |
| 21 | FW | NOR | Håkon Holmefjord Lorentzen (to (Netherlands) Helmond Sport) |
| 23 | DF | NOR | Erlend Hellevik Larsen (to Hødd) |
