= List of Norwegian football transfers summer 2023 =

This is a list of Norwegian football transfers in the 2023 summer transfer window by club. Only clubs of the 2023 Eliteserien and 2023 1. divisjon are included.

== Eliteserien ==
=== Aalesund ===
In: Note: Flags indicate national team as defined under FIFA eligibility rules; some limited exceptions apply. Players may hold more than one non-FIFA nationality.

| No. | Pos. | Nation | Player |
|---|---|---|---|
| 7 | FW | DEN | Tobias Klysner (on loan from (Denmark) Randers) |
| 8 | MF | NOR | Håkon Butli Hammer (from Raufoss) |
| 18 | FW | NOR | Martin Ramsland (from Sandnes Ulf) |
| 20 | DF | NOR | Oscar Solnørdal (loan return from Kongsvinger) |
| 23 | DF | NOR | Erik Ansok Frøysa (from Aalesund) |
| 35 | DF | NOR | Sebastian Berntsen (promoted from junior squad) |
| 40 | MF | NOR | Eivind Kolve (promoted from junior squad) |
| 41 | MF | NOR | Iver Krogh Hagen (promoted from junior squad) |
| 42 | MF | NOR | Sander Hestetun Kilen (promoted from junior squad) |
| 48 | GK | NOR | Sondre Nor Midthjell (promoted from junior squad) |

Out: Note: Flags indicate national team as defined under FIFA eligibility rules; some limited exceptions apply. Players may hold more than one non-FIFA nationality.

| No. | Pos. | Nation | Player |
|---|---|---|---|
| 7 | FW | DEN | Kasper Lunding (to (Denmark) Vendsyssel) |
| 10 | MF | NOR | Kristoffer Barmen (to Åsane) |
| 14 | DF | NOR | Ole Martin Kolskogen (on loan to Åsane) |
| 17 | FW | SEN | Mamadou Diaw (on loan to Sandnes Ulf, previously on loan at Bryne) |
| 18 | MF | NOR | Kristoffer Strand Ødven (released) |
| 23 | DF | NOR | Alexander Stølås (loan return to Sandnes Ulf) |
| 31 | DF | DEN | Alexander Munksgaard (loan return to (Denmark) AGF) |

=== Bodø/Glimt ===
In: Note: Flags indicate national team as defined under FIFA eligibility rules; some limited exceptions apply. Players may hold more than one non-FIFA nationality.

| No. | Pos. | Nation | Player |
|---|---|---|---|
| 10 | MF | NOR | Daniel Bassi (from Tromsø) |
| 22 | FW | NOR | Petter Nosakhare Dahl (loan return from KFUM) |
| 25 | FW | NOR | Tobias Fjeld Gulliksen (from Strømsgodset) |
| 28 | FW | NOR | Oscar Forsmo Kapskarmo (from Junkeren) |
| 47 | DF | NOR | Stian Kristiansen (from Junkeren) |

Out: Note: Flags indicate national team as defined under FIFA eligibility rules; some limited exceptions apply. Players may hold more than one non-FIFA nationality.

| No. | Pos. | Nation | Player |
|---|---|---|---|
| 9 | FW | NOR | Lasse Nordås (to Tromsø) |
| 10 | MF | NOR | Hugo Vetlesen (to (Belgium) Club Brugge) |
| 17 | MF | NOR | Gaute Vetti (on loan to Stabæk) |
| 21 | DF | CZE | Lucas Kubr (on loan to Moss) |
| 23 | FW | DEN | Jeppe Kjær (on loan to Sandefjord) |
| 26 | DF | NOR | Sigurd Kvile (on loan to Fredrikstad, previously on loan at Sarpsborg 08) |
| 33 | MF | NOR | Mats Pedersen (on loan to Mjøndalen) |
| 93 | FW | NOR | Joel Mvuka (loan return to (France) Lorient) |

=== Brann ===
In: Note: Flags indicate national team as defined under FIFA eligibility rules; some limited exceptions apply. Players may hold more than one non-FIFA nationality.

| No. | Pos. | Nation | Player |
|---|---|---|---|
| 7 | FW | DEN | Magnus Warming (from (Italy) Torino) |
| 17 | DF | NOR | Joachim Soltvedt (from Sandnes Ulf) |
| 18 | MF | NOR | Sander Kartum (from Kristiansund) |
| 22 | DF | SWE | Moonga Simba (loan return from (Sweden) Sundsvall) |
| 27 | MF | NOR | Mads Berg Sande (from Haugesund) |
| 37 | MF | NOR | David Tufekcic (promoted from junior squad) |
| 41 | FW | NOR | Elias Myrlid (promoted from junior squad, previously on loan at Kristiansund) |
| 43 | DF | NOR | Rasmus Holten (promoted from junior squad) |

Out: Note: Flags indicate national team as defined under FIFA eligibility rules; some limited exceptions apply. Players may hold more than one non-FIFA nationality.

| No. | Pos. | Nation | Player |
|---|---|---|---|
| 7 | MF | NOR | Mathias Rasmussen (to (Belgium) Union SG) |
| 18 | DF | NOR | David Møller Wolfe (to (Netherlands) AZ Alkmaar) |
| 31 | MF | NOR | Isak Tomar Hjorteseth (on loan to Åsane) |
| 41 | FW | NOR | Elias Myrlid (on loan to Kongsvinger) |
| 43 | DF | NOR | Rasmus Holten (on loan to Mjøndalen) |
| – | FW | NOR | Filip Møller Delaveris (on loan to Sandnes Ulf, previously on loan at (Sweden) J-Södra) |

=== HamKam ===
In: Note: Flags indicate national team as defined under FIFA eligibility rules; some limited exceptions apply. Players may hold more than one non-FIFA nationality.

| No. | Pos. | Nation | Player |
|---|---|---|---|
| 10 | FW | NOR | Moses Mawa (from Kristiansund) |
| 15 | FW | CIV | Ibrahim Romeo Olola (from (Ivory Coast) CO Monajoce) |
| 18 | MF | NOR | Morten Bjørlo (on loan from Rosenborg) |
| 21 | FW | ISL | Viðar Ari Jónsson (from (Iceland) FH) |

Out: Note: Flags indicate national team as defined under FIFA eligibility rules; some limited exceptions apply. Players may hold more than one non-FIFA nationality.

| No. | Pos. | Nation | Player |
|---|---|---|---|
| 17 | FW | SWE | Rasmus Wiedesheim-Paul (loan return to Rosenborg) |
| 18 | MF | NOR | Enok Naustdal (demoted to junior squad) |
| 21 | MF | NOR | Benjamin Faraas (to (Belgium) Club NXT) |
| 96 | GK | GUA | Nicholas Hagen (to (Israel) Bnei Sakhnin) |

=== Haugesund ===
In: Note: Flags indicate national team as defined under FIFA eligibility rules; some limited exceptions apply. Players may hold more than one non-FIFA nationality.

| No. | Pos. | Nation | Player |
|---|---|---|---|
| 11 | FW | TUN | Sebastian Tounekti (loan return from Ranheim) |
| 20 | FW | COD | Michee Ngalina (on loan from (Turkey) Göztepe) |
| 23 | MF | NED | Daan Huisman (on loan from (Netherlands) Vitesse) |
| 36 | DF | NOR | Eivind Helgeland (loan return from Vard) |
| 55 | DF | SEN | Madiodio Dia (from (Senegal) ASC Linguère) |
| 66 | MF | CIV | Amidou Traoré (from (Ivory Coast) Leader d'Agboville) |

Out: Note: Flags indicate national team as defined under FIFA eligibility rules; some limited exceptions apply. Players may hold more than one non-FIFA nationality.

| No. | Pos. | Nation | Player |
|---|---|---|---|
| 5 | DF | DEN | Søren Reese (to (Denmark) Horsens) |
| 10 | MF | ALB | Adrion Pajaziti (loan return to (England) Fulham Academy) |
| 11 | FW | TUN | Sebastian Tounekti (on loan to Ranheim) |
| 27 | MF | NOR | Mads Berg Sande (to Brann) |
| – | FW | NOR | Joacim Holtan (to Kongsvinger, previously on loan) |

=== Lillestrøm ===
In: Note: Flags indicate national team as defined under FIFA eligibility rules; some limited exceptions apply. Players may hold more than one non-FIFA nationality.

| No. | Pos. | Nation | Player |
|---|---|---|---|
| 5 | DF | USA | Sam Rogers (from Rosenborg) |
| 11 | DF | DEN | Frederik Elkær (from (Denmark) Hobro) |
| 14 | FW | CIV | Mathis Bolly (free transfer) |
| 15 | MF | CAN | Kosi Thompson (from (Canada) Toronto) |
| 29 | GK | NOR | Jørgen Sveinhaug (loan return from Grorud) |
| 33 | FW | NOR | Henrik Skogvold (loan return from Start) |

Out: Note: Flags indicate national team as defined under FIFA eligibility rules; some limited exceptions apply. Players may hold more than one non-FIFA nationality.

| No. | Pos. | Nation | Player |
|---|---|---|---|
| 1 | GK | NOR | Knut-André Skjærstein (on loan to Egersund) |
| 5 | DF | NOR | Vetle Dragsnes (to (Belgium) Charleroi) |
| 9 | FW | NGA | Akor Adams (to (France) Montpellier) |
| 14 | MF | NOR | Magnus Knudsen (loan return to (Russia) Rostov) |
| 21 | DF | NOR | Andreas Vindheim (loan return to (Czech Republic) Sparta Prague) |
| 24 | FW | NOR | Tobias Svendsen (to Odd) |

=== Molde ===
In: Note: Flags indicate national team as defined under FIFA eligibility rules; some limited exceptions apply. Players may hold more than one non-FIFA nationality.

| No. | Pos. | Nation | Player |
|---|---|---|---|
| 3 | DF | NOR | Casper Øyvann (from Tromsø) |
| 4 | MF | USA | Christian Cappis (on loan from (Denmark) Brøndby) |
| 5 | MF | NOR | Eirik Hestad (from (Cyprus) Pafos) |
| 8 | MF | NOR | Fredrik Gulbrandsen (from (Turkey) Adana Demirspor) |
| 46 | MF | NOR | Andreas Eikrem Myklebust (promoted from junior squad) |

Out: Note: Flags indicate national team as defined under FIFA eligibility rules; some limited exceptions apply. Players may hold more than one non-FIFA nationality.

| No. | Pos. | Nation | Player |
|---|---|---|---|
| 3 | DF | NOR | Birk Risa (to (United States) New York City) |
| 4 | DF | DEN | Benjamin Tiedemann Hansen (on loan to (Sweden) AIK) |
| 8 | MF | NOR | Sivert Mannsverk (to (Netherlands) Ajax) |
| 11 | FW | NOR | Ola Brynhildsen (to (Denmark) Midtjylland) |
| 17 | FW | NOR | Rafik Zekhnini (to Sarpsborg 08) |
| 23 | MF | NOR | Eirik Ulland Andersen (to Strømsgodset) |
| 32 | MF | SWE | Harun Ibrahim (on loan to (Sweden) Sirius) |

=== Odd ===
In: Note: Flags indicate national team as defined under FIFA eligibility rules; some limited exceptions apply. Players may hold more than one non-FIFA nationality.

| No. | Pos. | Nation | Player |
|---|---|---|---|
| 1 | GK | NOR | Per Kristian Bråtveit (from (Denmark) AGF) |
| 14 | FW | NOR | Tobias Svendsen (from Lillestrøm) |
| 18 | MF | NOR | Syver Aas (loan return from Skeid) |
| 22 | FW | GHA | Abdul Zakaria Mugees (from (Israel) Ashdod) |

Out: Note: Flags indicate national team as defined under FIFA eligibility rules; some limited exceptions apply. Players may hold more than one non-FIFA nationality.

| No. | Pos. | Nation | Player |
|---|---|---|---|
| 1 | GK | SWE | Leopold Wahlstedt (to (England) Blackburn Rovers) |
| 8 | FW | SRB | Milan Jevtović (to (Vietnam) Ha Noi) |
| 14 | MF | NOR | Conrad Wallem (to (Czech Republic) Slavia Prague) |
| 18 | MF | NOR | Syver Aas (on loan to Skeid) |
| – | FW | NOR | Abel William Stensrud (on loan to Moss, previously on loan at Bryne) |

=== Rosenborg ===
In: Note: Flags indicate national team as defined under FIFA eligibility rules; some limited exceptions apply. Players may hold more than one non-FIFA nationality.

| No. | Pos. | Nation | Player |
|---|---|---|---|
| 10 | MF | NOR | Ole Selnæs (from (Switzerland) Zürich) |
| 14 | FW | DEN | Emil Frederiksen (from (Denmark) SønderjyskE) |
| 25 | DF | SWE | Adam Andersson (loan return from (Denmark) Randers) |
| 27 | FW | NOR | Noah Holm (loan return from (France) Reims) |
| 28 | FW | SWE | Rasmus Wiedesheim-Paul (loan return from HamKam) |
| 38 | DF | NOR | Mikkel Ceïde (loan return from Kristiansund) |

Out: Note: Flags indicate national team as defined under FIFA eligibility rules; some limited exceptions apply. Players may hold more than one non-FIFA nationality.

| No. | Pos. | Nation | Player |
|---|---|---|---|
| 10 | FW | DEN | Carlo Holse (to (Turkey) Samsunspor) |
| 15 | DF | USA | Sam Rogers (to Lillestrøm) |
| 18 | MF | NOR | Morten Bjørlo (on loan to HamKam) |
| 22 | FW | FIN | Agon Sadiku (on loan to Start) |
| 29 | FW | NOR | Oscar Aga (on loan to Fredrikstad) |
| 80 | FW | ISL | Kristall Máni Ingason (to (Denmark) SønderjyskE) |

=== Sandefjord ===
In: Note: Flags indicate national team as defined under FIFA eligibility rules; some limited exceptions apply. Players may hold more than one non-FIFA nationality.

| No. | Pos. | Nation | Player |
|---|---|---|---|
| 4 | DF | NOR | Fredrik Carson Pedersen (from Grorud) |
| 10 | FW | DEN | Jeppe Kjær (on loan from Bodø/Glimt) |
| 32 | DF | NOR | Martin Gjone (promoted from junior squad) |
| 34 | FW | NOR | Storm Bugge Pettersen (promoted from junior squad) |

Out: Note: Flags indicate national team as defined under FIFA eligibility rules; some limited exceptions apply. Players may hold more than one non-FIFA nationality.

| No. | Pos. | Nation | Player |
|---|---|---|---|
| 4 | DF | NED | Ian Smeulers (to (Netherlands) Excelsior) |
| 5 | MF | EQG | Federico Bikoro (released) |
| 13 | DF | NOR | Lars Markmanrud (on loan to Egersund) |
| 18 | FW | NOR | Wally Njie (on loan to Ørn Horten) |
| 54 | GK | NOR | Andreas Albertsen (to Halsen) |
| – | DF | NED | Quint Jansen (to (Cyprus) Othellos Athienou, previously on loan at Mjøndalen) |

=== Sarpsborg 08 ===
In: Note: Flags indicate national team as defined under FIFA eligibility rules; some limited exceptions apply. Players may hold more than one non-FIFA nationality.

| No. | Pos. | Nation | Player |
|---|---|---|---|
| 1 | GK | NOR | Kjetil Haug (on loan from (France) Toulouse) |
| 3 | DF | ESP | Arnau Casas (from (Spain) Barcelona B) |
| 14 | MF | NOR | Jo Inge Berget (free transfer) |
| 17 | DF | NOR | Anders Hiim (from Sandnes Ulf) |
| 19 | FW | DEN | Henrik Meister (from (Denmark) Fremad Amager) |
| 23 | FW | NOR | Niklas Sandberg (from Viking) |
| 30 | DF | NGA | Franklin Tebo Uchenna (from (Sweden) Häcken) |
| 74 | FW | NOR | Aridon Racaj (loan return from Raufoss) |
| 98 | FW | NOR | Rafik Zekhnini (from Molde) |

Out: Note: Flags indicate national team as defined under FIFA eligibility rules; some limited exceptions apply. Players may hold more than one non-FIFA nationality.

| No. | Pos. | Nation | Player |
|---|---|---|---|
| 3 | DF | NOR | Sigurd Kvile (loan return to Bodø/Glimt) |
| 7 | FW | NOR | Martin Hoel Andersen (on loan to Kongsvinger) |
| 12 | GK | NOR | Jarik Sundling (on loan to Sogndal) |
| 15 | FW | NOR | Steffen Lie Skålevik (to Åsane) |
| 17 | DF | NOR | Joachim Soltvedt (to Brann) |
| 23 | FW | DEN | Gustav Mogensen (on loan to Hødd) |
| 26 | FW | BFA | Moubarack Compaoré (to (Denmark) Hobro) |
| 74 | FW | NOR | Aridon Racaj (on loan to Raufoss) |
| 77 | DF | NOR | Markus Olsvik Welinder (on loan to Kjelsås) |
| 90 | MF | GHA | Christopher Bonsu Baah (to (Belgium) Genk) |

=== Stabæk ===
In: Note: Flags indicate national team as defined under FIFA eligibility rules; some limited exceptions apply. Players may hold more than one non-FIFA nationality.

| No. | Pos. | Nation | Player |
|---|---|---|---|
| 16 | FW | DEN | Luca Kjerrumgaard (on loan from (Denmark) OB) |
| 17 | FW | NOR | Rasmus Eggen Vinge (from Kjelsås) |
| 18 | MF | NOR | Gaute Vetti (on loan from Bodø/Glimt) |
| 23 | MF | AUS | Keegan Jelacic (on loan from (Belgium) Gent) |
| 26 | FW | NGA | Paul Ogunkoya (on loan from (Nigeria) Mahanaim) |
| 69 | FW | DEN | Kasper Høgh (from (Denmark) AaB, previously on loan) |

Out: Note: Flags indicate national team as defined under FIFA eligibility rules; some limited exceptions apply. Players may hold more than one non-FIFA nationality.

| No. | Pos. | Nation | Player |
|---|---|---|---|
| 6 | DF | DEN | Andreas Skovgaard (to (Poland) Cracovia) |
| 17 | MF | NOR | Amir Jama (demoted to junior squad) |
| 39 | FW | NOR | Marcus Seim-Monsen (to (Denmark) Nordsjælland) |
| 47 | MF | BRA | Jonatan Lucca (to (Portugal) AVS) |

=== Strømsgodset ===
In: Note: Flags indicate national team as defined under FIFA eligibility rules; some limited exceptions apply. Players may hold more than one non-FIFA nationality.

| No. | Pos. | Nation | Player |
|---|---|---|---|
| 5 | DF | NOR | Bent Sørmo (from (Belgium) Zulte Waregem) |
| 9 | FW | NOR | Elias Hoff Melkersen (on loan from (Scotland) Hibs) |
| 17 | DF | ISL | Logi Tómasson (from (Iceland) Víkingur) |
| 19 | FW | NOR | Chrisander B. Sørum (promoted from junior squad) |
| 23 | MF | NOR | Eirik Ulland Andersen (from Molde) |

Out: Note: Flags indicate national team as defined under FIFA eligibility rules; some limited exceptions apply. Players may hold more than one non-FIFA nationality.

| No. | Pos. | Nation | Player |
|---|---|---|---|
| 6 | MF | NGA | Jack Ipalibo (to (Greece) Kifisia) |
| 9 | FW | NOR | Jonatan Braut Brunes (to (Belgium) OH Leuven) |
| 17 | FW | NOR | Tobias Fjeld Gulliksen (to Bodø/Glimt) |
| 19 | FW | NOR | Albert Palmberg Thorsen (to (United States) Pittsburgh Panthers) |
| 47 | MF | NOR | Andreas Waterfield Skjold (to Notodden) |

=== Tromsø ===
In: Note: Flags indicate national team as defined under FIFA eligibility rules; some limited exceptions apply. Players may hold more than one non-FIFA nationality.

| No. | Pos. | Nation | Player |
|---|---|---|---|
| 18 | FW | NOR | Lasse Nordås (from Bodø/Glimt) |
| 20 | DF | NOR | Dadi Dodou Gaye (from KFUM) |
| 30 | DF | NOR | Isak Vådebu (from Tromsdalen) |

Out: Note: Flags indicate national team as defined under FIFA eligibility rules; some limited exceptions apply. Players may hold more than one non-FIFA nationality.

| No. | Pos. | Nation | Player |
|---|---|---|---|
| 3 | DF | NOR | Jesper Robertsen (on loan to Mjøndalen) |
| 9 | MF | ISL | Hilmir Rafn Mikaelsson (loan return to (Italy) Venezia) |
| 18 | FW | NOR | Elias Aarflot (on loan to Grorud, previously on loan at Lyn) |
| 20 | DF | NOR | Casper Øyvann (to Molde) |
| 21 | MF | NOR | Tobias Hafstad (on loan to Egersund) |
| 24 | MF | NOR | Daniel Bassi (to Bodø/Glimt) |

=== Viking ===
In: Note: Flags indicate national team as defined under FIFA eligibility rules; some limited exceptions apply. Players may hold more than one non-FIFA nationality.

| No. | Pos. | Nation | Player |
|---|---|---|---|
| 13 | GK | NOR | Magnus Rugland Ree (loan return from Levanger) |
| 19 | MF | NOR | Sondre Auklend (loan return from Jerv) |
| 22 | DF | NOR | Sondre Klingen Langås (from Ranheim) |
| 25 | MF | NZL | Joe Bell (from (Denmark) Brøndby) |
| 27 | FW | NGA | Samuel Adegbenro (on loan from (China) Beijing Guoan) |

Out: Note: Flags indicate national team as defined under FIFA eligibility rules; some limited exceptions apply. Players may hold more than one non-FIFA nationality.

| No. | Pos. | Nation | Player |
|---|---|---|---|
| 15 | FW | NOR | Niklas Sandberg (to Sarpsborg 08) |
| 17 | FW | NOR | Edvin Austbø (on loan to Sandnes Ulf) |
| 26 | FW | NOR | Simen Kvia-Egeskog (on loan to Hødd, then to Skeid) |
| 27 | MF | ISL | Birkir Bjarnason (to (Italy) Brescia) |
| 34 | DF | NOR | Kristoffer Forgaard Paulsen (on loan to Junkeren, previously on loan at (Iceland) KA Akureyri) |

=== Vålerenga ===
In: Note: Flags indicate national team as defined under FIFA eligibility rules; some limited exceptions apply. Players may hold more than one non-FIFA nationality.

| No. | Pos. | Nation | Player |
|---|---|---|---|
| 15 | MF | NOR | Elias Kristoffersen Hagen (from (Sweden) IFK Göteborg) |
| 19 | FW | SRB | Andrej Ilić (from (Latvia) RFS) |
| 22 | MF | NOR | Stian Sjøvold Thorstensen (promoted from junior squad) |
| 23 | DF | AUT | Martin Kreuzriegler (from (Poland) Widzew Lodz) |
| 27 | FW | NOR | Adrian Kurd Rønning (promoted from junior squad) |
| 33 | DF | ALB | Eneo Bitri (from (Czech Republic) Baník Ostrava) |

Out: Note: Flags indicate national team as defined under FIFA eligibility rules; some limited exceptions apply. Players may hold more than one non-FIFA nationality.

| No. | Pos. | Nation | Player |
|---|---|---|---|
| 5 | DF | MKD | Leonard Zuta (to (Sweden) Brommapojkarna) |
| 11 | FW | TUN | Amor Layouni (to (Sweden) Häcken, previously on loan at (Australia) Western Sydney Wanderers) |
| 15 | MF | NOR | Odin Thiago Holm (to (Scotland) Celtic) |
| 16 | MF | NOR | Mathias Emilsen (to Ranheim, previously on loan at Sandnes Ulf) |
| 19 | FW | NOR | Seedy Jatta (to (Austria) Sturm Graz) |
| 23 | DF | NOR | Henrik Heggheim (loan return to (Denmark) Brøndby) |
| 33 | MF | NOR | Jones El-Abdellaoui (on loan to KFUM) |

== 1. divisjon ==
=== Bryne ===
In: Note: Flags indicate national team as defined under FIFA eligibility rules; some limited exceptions apply. Players may hold more than one non-FIFA nationality.

| No. | Pos. | Nation | Player |
|---|---|---|---|
| 18 | FW | POR | Duarte Moreira (from (Portugal) Valadares Gaia) |
| 19 | DF | NOR | Tobias Guddal (loan return from Levanger) |

Out: Note: Flags indicate national team as defined under FIFA eligibility rules; some limited exceptions apply. Players may hold more than one non-FIFA nationality.

| No. | Pos. | Nation | Player |
|---|---|---|---|
| 11 | FW | NOR | Abel William Stensrud (loan return to Odd) |
| 17 | MF | NOR | Elias Ivesdal Årsvoll (on loan to Notodden) |
| 18 | FW | SEN | Mamadou Diaw (loan return to Aalesund) |
| 21 | FW | NOR | Ingmar Orkelbog Austberg (on loan to Tiller, previously on loan at Stjørdals-Blink) |

=== Fredrikstad ===
In: Note: Flags indicate national team as defined under FIFA eligibility rules; some limited exceptions apply. Players may hold more than one non-FIFA nationality.

| No. | Pos. | Nation | Player |
|---|---|---|---|
| 13 | FW | NOR | Sondre Sørløkk (from Ull/Kisa) |
| 17 | DF | NOR | Sigurd Kvile (on loan from Bodø/Glimt) |
| 22 | DF | GHA | Maxwell Woledzi (from (Portugal) Vitória Guimarães B) |
| 27 | DF | DEN | Mikkel Lassen (on loan from (Denmark) Horsens) |
| 28 | DF | NOR | Imre Bech Hermansen (promoted from junior squad) |
| 29 | FW | NOR | Oscar Aga (on loan from Rosenborg) |

Out: Note: Flags indicate national team as defined under FIFA eligibility rules; some limited exceptions apply. Players may hold more than one non-FIFA nationality.

| No. | Pos. | Nation | Player |
|---|---|---|---|
| 7 | MF | NOR | Thomas Drage (to (Gibraltar) Europa Point) |
| 17 | DF | NOR | Tage Johansen (on loan to Skeid) |
| 21 | DF | NOR | Oscar Kjøge Jansson (on loan to Raufoss) |
| 24 | FW | SWE | Noa Williams (on loan to Skeid) |
| 29 | FW | SWE | Lucas Lima (on loan to (Sweden) Helsingborg) |

=== Hødd ===
In: Note: Flags indicate national team as defined under FIFA eligibility rules; some limited exceptions apply. Players may hold more than one non-FIFA nationality.

| No. | Pos. | Nation | Player |
|---|---|---|---|
| 16 | FW | NOR | Simen Kvia-Egeskog (on loan from Viking) |
| 21 | FW | DEN | Gustav Mogensen (on loan from Sarpsborg 08) |
| 28 | DF | GRE | Renato Ziko (from (Albania) Laçi) |

Out: Note: Flags indicate national team as defined under FIFA eligibility rules; some limited exceptions apply. Players may hold more than one non-FIFA nationality.

| No. | Pos. | Nation | Player |
|---|---|---|---|
| 3 | DF | SWE | Rasmus Bonde (loan return to (Sweden) AIK) |
| 16 | FW | NOR | Simen Kvia-Egeskog (loan return to Viking) |

=== Jerv ===
In: Note: Flags indicate national team as defined under FIFA eligibility rules; some limited exceptions apply. Players may hold more than one non-FIFA nationality.

| No. | Pos. | Nation | Player |
|---|---|---|---|
| 7 | FW | NOR | Runar Hauge (from (Scotland) Hibs) |
| 13 | GK | NOR | Emil Windegaard (promoted from junior squad) |
| 17 | FW | MLI | Bassekou Diabaté (from (Poland) Lechia Gdansk) |
| 21 | DF | NED | Dean van der Sluys (from (Netherlands) TOP Oss) |
| 25 | FW | NOR | Andreas Endresen (from Vard) |
| 26 | GK | NOR | Georg Esperaas Dirdal (from Vigør) |
| 28 | FW | NOR | Emanuel Grønner (on loan from Sogndal) |
| 29 | DF | SEN | Aliou Coly (from Kristiansund) |
| 39 | FW | GER | Felix Schröter (from (United States) Tampa Bay Rowdies) |
| 54 | MF | NOR | Phillip Syvertsen (promoted from junior squad) |

Out: Note: Flags indicate national team as defined under FIFA eligibility rules; some limited exceptions apply. Players may hold more than one non-FIFA nationality.

| No. | Pos. | Nation | Player |
|---|---|---|---|
| 21 | MF | NOR | Sondre Auklend (loan return to Viking) |
| 22 | DF | NOR | Henrik Bredeli (released) |
| 28 | FW | NOR | Emanuel Grønner (loan return to Sogndal) |

=== KFUM ===
In: Note: Flags indicate national team as defined under FIFA eligibility rules; some limited exceptions apply. Players may hold more than one non-FIFA nationality.

| No. | Pos. | Nation | Player |
|---|---|---|---|
| 21 | FW | NOR | Sondre Spieler Halvorsen (from Follo) |
| 22 | DF | NOR | Mohammed Hopsdal Abbas (from Nordstrand) |
| 28 | MF | NOR | Jones El-Abdellaoui (on loan from Vålerenga) |
| 30 | MF | NOR | Adnan Hadzic (from (Denmark) SønderjyskE) |
| 31 | GK | IRN | Sosha Makani (free transfer) |
| 33 | DF | NOR | William Silvfer-Ramage (promoted from junior squad) |

Out: Note: Flags indicate national team as defined under FIFA eligibility rules; some limited exceptions apply. Players may hold more than one non-FIFA nationality.

| No. | Pos. | Nation | Player |
|---|---|---|---|
| 3 | DF | NOR | Dadi Dodou Gaye (to Tromsø) |
| 10 | FW | NOR | Thomas Klemetsen Jakobsen (to Moss) |
| 22 | FW | NOR | Petter Nosakhare Dahl (loan return to Bodø/Glimt) |
| 37 | MF | NOR | Håkon Stavrum (retired) |

=== Kongsvinger ===
In: Note: Flags indicate national team as defined under FIFA eligibility rules; some limited exceptions apply. Players may hold more than one non-FIFA nationality.

| No. | Pos. | Nation | Player |
|---|---|---|---|
| 11 | FW | NOR | Martin Hoel Andersen (on loan from Sarpsborg 08) |
| 14 | FW | NOR | Mikael Harbosen Haga (from Træff) |
| 18 | FW | NOR | Joacim Holtan (from Haugesund, previously on loan) |
| 26 | FW | NOR | Elias Myrlid (on loan from Brann) |
| 28 | FW | NOR | Rasmus Opdal Christiansen (from (Netherlands) Heerenveen U20) |

Out: Note: Flags indicate national team as defined under FIFA eligibility rules; some limited exceptions apply. Players may hold more than one non-FIFA nationality.

| No. | Pos. | Nation | Player |
|---|---|---|---|
| 2 | DF | NOR | Oscar Solnørdal (loan return to Aalesund) |
| 11 | MF | NOR | Sander Marthinussen (to Arendal) |
| 14 | FW | NOR | Brage Berg Pedersen (to Hønefoss) |
| 32 | FW | NOR | Nikolai Ronaldo Bull Jørgensen (to (United States) Duke Blue Devils) |
| 67 | MF | NOR | Jan Marius Høiby (to Elverum) |

=== Kristiansund ===
In: Note: Flags indicate national team as defined under FIFA eligibility rules; some limited exceptions apply. Players may hold more than one non-FIFA nationality.

| No. | Pos. | Nation | Player |
|---|---|---|---|
| 12 | GK | NOR | Adrian Sæther (loan return from Træff) |
| 24 | MF | NGA | Wilfred George Igor (on loan from (Nigeria) Hype Buzz) |
| 38 | FW | NOR | Awet Alemseged (promoted from junior squad) |

Out: Note: Flags indicate national team as defined under FIFA eligibility rules; some limited exceptions apply. Players may hold more than one non-FIFA nationality.

| No. | Pos. | Nation | Player |
|---|---|---|---|
| 8 | MF | NOR | Sander Kartum (to Brann) |
| 11 | FW | NOR | Moses Mawa (to Hamkam) |
| 12 | GK | NOR | Adrian Sæther (on loan to Træff) |
| 16 | DF | NOR | Mikkel Ceïde (loan return to Rosenborg) |
| 19 | DF | SEN | Aliou Coly (to Jerv) |
| 20 | FW | NOR | Elias Myrlid (loan return to Brann) |
| 24 | MF | GHA | David Agbo (to (Finland) Inter Turku) |
| 25 | DF | GHA | Isaac Annan (released) |
| 36 | DF | NOR | Bendik Brevik (on loan to (Sweden) Piteå) |

=== Mjøndalen ===
In: Note: Flags indicate national team as defined under FIFA eligibility rules; some limited exceptions apply. Players may hold more than one non-FIFA nationality.

| No. | Pos. | Nation | Player |
|---|---|---|---|
| 21 | DF | NOR | Jesper Robertsen (on loan from Tromsø) |
| 23 | DF | NOR | Rasmus Holten (on loan from Brann) |
| 24 | MF | NOR | Mats Pedersen (on loan from Bodø/Glimt) |
| 28 | DF | NOR | Mathias Bauer (from (Germany) FC Memmingen) |

Out: Note: Flags indicate national team as defined under FIFA eligibility rules; some limited exceptions apply. Players may hold more than one non-FIFA nationality.

| No. | Pos. | Nation | Player |
|---|---|---|---|
| 4 | DF | NOR | Adrian Hansen (to Raufoss) |
| 20 | FW | NOR | Kristian Strømland Lien (to (Netherlands) Groningen) |
| 23 | DF | NED | Quint Jansen (loan return to Sandefjord) |

=== Moss ===
In: Note: Flags indicate national team as defined under FIFA eligibility rules; some limited exceptions apply. Players may hold more than one non-FIFA nationality.

| No. | Pos. | Nation | Player |
|---|---|---|---|
| 10 | MF | NOR | Bo Åsulv Hegland (from Frigg) |
| 11 | FW | NOR | Thomas Klemetsen Jakobsen (from KFUM) |
| 24 | DF | CZE | Lucas Kubr (on loan from Bodø/Glimt) |
| 29 | FW | NOR | Abel William Stensrud (on loan from Odd) |

Out: Note: Flags indicate national team as defined under FIFA eligibility rules; some limited exceptions apply. Players may hold more than one non-FIFA nationality.

| No. | Pos. | Nation | Player |
|---|---|---|---|
| 7 | FW | ETH | Amin Askar (to Sprint-Jeløy) |
| 10 | FW | DEN | Lorent Callaku (released) |
| 11 | FW | NOR | Kabamba Kalabatama (on loan to Kvik Halden, then sold to Ull/Kisa) |
| 18 | DF | NOR | Leonard Getz (on loan to Sprint-Jeløy) |
| 22 | MF | NOR | Sander Martinsen-Wold (on loan to Sprint-Jeløy) |
| 25 | MF | NOR | Adan Abadala Hussein (on loan to Tromsdalen) |

=== Ranheim ===
In: Note: Flags indicate national team as defined under FIFA eligibility rules; some limited exceptions apply. Players may hold more than one non-FIFA nationality.

| No. | Pos. | Nation | Player |
|---|---|---|---|
| 4 | DF | NOR | Nikolai Skuseth (from Molde 2) |
| 14 | MF | NOR | Mathias Emilsen (from Vålerenga) |
| 16 | DF | NOR | Lasse Qvigstad (from Rosenborg 2, previously on loan) |
| 17 | FW | NOR | Jonas Bolkan Nordli (from Byåsen) |
| 22 | MF | NOR | Sigurd Prestmo (from Trygg/Lade) |
| 24 | FW | TUN | Sebastian Tounekti (on loan from Haugesund) |
| 24 | DF | NOR | Håkon Gangstad (from (Netherlands) Zwolle) |
| 25 | MF | NOR | Oliver Holden (on loan from Rosenborg 2) |
| 27 | FW | NOR | Vetle Wenaas (from Strindheim) |
| – | | NOR | Lucas Kolstad (from Tiller) |

Out: Note: Flags indicate national team as defined under FIFA eligibility rules; some limited exceptions apply. Players may hold more than one non-FIFA nationality.

| No. | Pos. | Nation | Player |
|---|---|---|---|
| 4 | DF | NOR | Sondre Klingen Langås (to Viking) |
| 14 | MF | SWE | Simon Marklund (to (Sweden) Östersund) |
| 23 | MF | NOR | Henrik Loholt Kristiansen (on loan to Lyn) |
| 24 | FW | TUN | Sebastian Tounekti (loan return to Haugesund) |
| – | | NOR | Lucas Kolstad (on loan to Tiller) |

=== Raufoss ===
In: Note: Flags indicate national team as defined under FIFA eligibility rules; some limited exceptions apply. Players may hold more than one non-FIFA nationality.

| No. | Pos. | Nation | Player |
|---|---|---|---|
| 2 | DF | NOR | Adrian Hansen (from Mjøndalen) |
| 5 | DF | NOR | Oscar Kjøge Jansson (on loan from Fredrikstad) |
| 6 | MF | LVA | Eduards Emsis (from (Albania) Egnatia) |
| 15 | FW | NOR | Aridon Racaj (on loan from Sarpsborg 08) |
| 15 | FW | GHA | James Ampofo (from (Greece) Episkopi) |
| 22 | MF | ENG | Ryan Lee Nelson (from Gjøvik-Lyn) |
| 24 | MF | NOR | Hynor Gashnjani (promoted from junior squad) |
| 33 | FW | BRA | Matheus Vieira (on loan from (Switzerland) Etoile Carouge) |

Out: Note: Flags indicate national team as defined under FIFA eligibility rules; some limited exceptions apply. Players may hold more than one non-FIFA nationality.

| No. | Pos. | Nation | Player |
|---|---|---|---|
| 2 | DF | NOR | Trygve Løberg (to Grorud) |
| 5 | DF | NOR | Arnar Þór Guðjónsson (released) |
| 6 | MF | NOR | Håkon Butli Hammer (to Aalesund) |
| 15 | FW | NOR | Aridon Racaj (loan return to Sarpsborg 08) |
| 18 | MF | NOR | Kodjo Somesi (on loan to Gjøvik-Lyn) |
| 22 | MF | NOR | Adrian Olsen Teigen (to Levanger) |
| 25 | DF | NOR | Erik Ansok Frøysa (to Aalesund) |
| 33 | FW | BRA | Matheus Vieira (loan return to (Switzerland) Etoile Carouge) |

=== Sandnes Ulf ===
In: Note: Flags indicate national team as defined under FIFA eligibility rules; some limited exceptions apply. Players may hold more than one non-FIFA nationality.

| No. | Pos. | Nation | Player |
|---|---|---|---|
| 9 | FW | SEN | Mamadou Diaw (on loan from Aalesund) |
| 11 | DF | NOR | Alexander Stølås (loan return from Aalesund) |
| 21 | FW | NOR | Edvin Austbø (on loan from Viking) |
| 23 | DF | NOR | Erik Berland (promoted from junior squad) |
| 27 | GK | NOR | Sander Lønning (loan return from Egersund) |
| 29 | FW | NOR | Filip Møller Delaveris (on loan from Brann) |

Out: Note: Flags indicate national team as defined under FIFA eligibility rules; some limited exceptions apply. Players may hold more than one non-FIFA nationality.

| No. | Pos. | Nation | Player |
|---|---|---|---|
| 5 | MF | NOR | Mathias Emilsen (loan return to Vålerenga) |
| 9 | FW | NOR | Martin Ramsland (to Aalesund) |
| 21 | DF | NOR | Anders Hiim (to Sarpsborg 08) |

=== Skeid ===
In: Note: Flags indicate national team as defined under FIFA eligibility rules; some limited exceptions apply. Players may hold more than one non-FIFA nationality.

| No. | Pos. | Nation | Player |
|---|---|---|---|
| 18 | FW | NOR | Ole Sebastian Sundgot (from Ull/Kisa) |
| 19 | DF | NOR | Ousmane Diallo Toure (loan return from Træff) |
| 22 | MF | NOR | Syver Aas (on loan from Odd) |
| 27 | FW | NOR | Simen Kvia-Egeskog (on loan from Viking) |
| 28 | FW | SWE | Noa Williams (on loan from Fredrikstad) |
| 30 | GK | NOR | Kasper Lunde Ofstad (loan return from Lokomotiv Oslo) |
| 34 | DF | NOR | Tage Johansen (on loan from Fredrikstad) |

Out: Note: Flags indicate national team as defined under FIFA eligibility rules; some limited exceptions apply. Players may hold more than one non-FIFA nationality.

| No. | Pos. | Nation | Player |
|---|---|---|---|
| 5 | DF | NOR | Anders Johan Johansen (to Bærum) |
| 6 | MF | NOR | Erik Nordengen (to Fram) |
| 18 | MF | KOS | Florind Lokaj (on loan to Kvik Halden) |
| 22 | MF | NOR | Syver Aas (loan return to Odd) |
| 27 | FW | NOR | Kristoffer Hoven (to (Sweden) Varberg) |

=== Sogndal ===
In: Note: Flags indicate national team as defined under FIFA eligibility rules; some limited exceptions apply. Players may hold more than one non-FIFA nationality.

| No. | Pos. | Nation | Player |
|---|---|---|---|
| 21 | GK | NOR | Jarik Sundling (on loan from Sarpsborg 08) |
| 28 | FW | NOR | Emanuel Grønner (loan return from Jerv) |
| 31 | FW | NOR | Joakim Berg Nundal (promoted from junior squad) |
| 77 | MF | ISL | Óskar Borgþórsson (from (Iceland) Fylkir) |

Out: Note: Flags indicate national team as defined under FIFA eligibility rules; some limited exceptions apply. Players may hold more than one non-FIFA nationality.

| No. | Pos. | Nation | Player |
|---|---|---|---|
| 21 | GK | NOR | Jørgen Johnsen (to Bjarg) |
| 28 | FW | NOR | Emanuel Grønner (on loan to Jerv) |
| 37 | GK | NOR | Håvard Hetle (released) |
| 99 | FW | MEX | Alejandro Díaz (on loan to (Canada) Vancouver) |

=== Start ===
In: Note: Flags indicate national team as defined under FIFA eligibility rules; some limited exceptions apply. Players may hold more than one non-FIFA nationality.

| No. | Pos. | Nation | Player |
|---|---|---|---|
| 22 | FW | FIN | Agon Sadiku (on loan from Rosenborg) |
| 23 | DF | FIN | Kalle Wallius (from (Italy) Bologna Primavera) |
| 31 | DF | NOR | Deni Dashaev (promoted from junior squad) |
| 31 | DF | NOR | Deni Dashaev (loan return from Fløy) |
| 42 | MF | NOR | Adrian Eftestad Nilsen (promoted from junior squad) |

Out: Note: Flags indicate national team as defined under FIFA eligibility rules; some limited exceptions apply. Players may hold more than one non-FIFA nationality.

| No. | Pos. | Nation | Player |
|---|---|---|---|
| 9 | FW | SWE | Zakaria Sawo (to (Cyprus) Aris Limassol) |
| 19 | FW | NOR | Emil Grønn Pedersen (to Vindbjart) |
| 20 | MF | NOR | Levi Eftevaag (on loan to Fløy) |
| 23 | FW | NOR | Henrik Skogvold (loan return to Lillestrøm) |
| 27 | FW | NOR | Sander Svela (on loan to Tromsdalen) |
| 31 | DF | NOR | Deni Dashaev (on loan to Fløy) |

=== Åsane ===
In: Note: Flags indicate national team as defined under FIFA eligibility rules; some limited exceptions apply. Players may hold more than one non-FIFA nationality.

| No. | Pos. | Nation | Player |
|---|---|---|---|
| 4 | DF | NOR | Jonas Eide Vågen (loan return from Os) |
| 10 | MF | NOR | Kristoffer Barmen (from Aalesund) |
| 11 | FW | NOR | Steffen Lie Skålevik (from Sarpsborg 08) |
| 12 | GK | NOR | Oliver M. Madsen (promoted from junior squad) |
| 31 | MF | NOR | Isak Tomar Hjorteseth (on loan from Brann) |
| 40 | DF | NOR | Ole Martin Kolskogen (on loan from Aalesund) |

Out: Note: Flags indicate national team as defined under FIFA eligibility rules; some limited exceptions apply. Players may hold more than one non-FIFA nationality.

| No. | Pos. | Nation | Player |
|---|---|---|---|
| 10 | FW | NOR | Jacob Jacobsen Bolsø (on loan to Træff) |
| 23 | MF | NOR | Lars Kilen (to Lysekloster) |
