= 2022 Kristiansund BK season =

Kristiansund
2022 season
- Chairman: Vidar Solli
- Head coach: Christian Michelsen
- Stadium: Kristiansund Stadion
- Eliteserien: 15th (relegated)
- Norwegian Cup: Third round
- Top goalscorer: League: Bendik Bye (9); All: Bendik Bye (9)
Home colours	Away colours

The 2022 season was Kristiansund BK's 19th season in existence and the club's sixth consecutive season in the top flight of Norwegian football. In addition to the domestic league, Kristiansund BK participated in this season's edition of the Norwegian Football Cup.

The season was unique in that Kristiansund BK was relegated for the first time in the history of the club.

Ahead of the season, the team was widely tipped to avoid relegation and even challenge for a spot in European competitions. The local newspaper in Kristiansund, Tidens Krav, had them in 4th place in their pre-season tip. Furthermore, Kristiansund was tipped in 6th place by Adresseavisen, Rogalands Avis and iTromsø; in 7th place by Sandefjords Blad and Nordlys; in 8th place by Stavanger Aftenblad, Sunnmørsposten, Romerikes Blad and Hamar Arbeiderblad; in 9th place Dagbladet and Romsdals Budstikke; and 10th place by Verdens Gang, Drammens Tidende and Radio Metro.

The season was particularly marred by instability in defense. The club went through a large number of central defenders. In April 2022, Dan Peter Ulvestad sustained a back prolapse and was out for several months. In early May, Aliou Coly tore a muscle and Max Normann Williamsen tore three ankle ligaments. Kristiansund resorted to a domestic youth loan, a loan transfer that is permitted outside of the transfer window, of Sigurd Kvile. He started the game against Haugesund together with Andreas Hopmark in central defense, but Kvile broke his collarbone after 11 minutes, and Hopmark was injured in extra time. Another defender was signed on a domestic youth loan, Aalesund's Nikolai Hopland, but in a move deemed as farcical by Kristiansund's staff, Hopland was recalled after only 12 days. Former 1. divisjon defender Marius Alm was picked up on a free transfer on 10 May, but released in early August as central defenders started to return from their injuries. As the injury situation again worsened in mid-August, Kristiansund resorted to signing former player Henrik Gjesdal. The club also managed to loan Sigurd Kvile a second time.

== Players ==
=== First team squad ===
As of 25 February 2022

Note: Flags indicate national team as defined under FIFA eligibility rules; some limited exceptions apply. Players may hold more than one non-FIFA nationality.

No.	Pos.	Nation	Player
1	GK	IRL	Sean McDermott
2	DF	NOR	Snorre Strand Nilsen
3	DF	NOR	Christoffer Aasbak
4	DF	NOR	Henrik Gjesdal
5	DF	NOR	Dan Peter Ulvestad
6	DF	NOR	Andreas Hopmark
7	MF	NOR	Torgil Øwre Gjertsen
8	MF	NOR	Sander Kartum
10	MF	SWE	Liridon Kalludra
11	FW	NOR	Moses Mawa
13	FW	NOR	Bendik Bye
14	MF	NOR	Jesper Isaksen
15	FW	NOR	Mikkel Rakneberg
16	DF	NOR	Sigurd Kvile (on loan from Bodø/Glimt)
17	FW	ISL	Brynjólfur Willumsson
18	DF	NOR	Sebastian Jarl

No.	Pos.	Nation	Player
19	DF	SEN	Aliou Coly
21	MF	SEN	Amidou Diop
23	FW	ETH	Amin Askar
24	MF	GHA	David Agbo
25	DF	GHA	Isaac Annan
26	DF	NOR	Max Normann Williamsen
27	FW	POL	Pawel Chrupalla (on loan from Rosenborg)
29	FW	CMR	Faris Pemi Moumbagna
30	GK	SEN	Serigne Mbaye
31	FW	NOR	Leander Alvheim
35	DF	NOR	Isak Aalberg
36	DF	NOR	Bendik Brevik
37	FW	NOR	Oskar Sivertsen
38	FW	NOR	Marius Weidel
40	GK	NOR	Adrian Sæther

=== Out on loan ===
Note: Flags indicate national team as defined under FIFA eligibility rules; some limited exceptions apply. Players may hold more than one non-FIFA nationality.

No.	Pos.	Nation	Player
12	GK	SWE	Elias Hadaya (on loan at Bryne until 31 December 2022)
22	DF	NOR	Martin Sjølstad (on loan at Kongsvinger until 31 December 2022)
39	MF	NOR	Heine Gikling Bruseth (on loan at Levanger until 31 December 2022)

== Transfers ==
=== Winter ===
In: Note: Flags indicate national team as defined under FIFA eligibility rules; some limited exceptions apply. Players may hold more than one non-FIFA nationality.

No.	Pos.	Nation	Player
15	FW	NOR	Mikkel Rakneberg (from Ull/Kisa)
16	DF	NOR	Sigurd Kvile (on loan from Bodø/Glimt)
18	MF	NOR	Sebastian Jarl (from Sarpsborg 08)
22	DF	NOR	Martin Sjølstad (from Strømmen)
24	MF	GHA	David Agbo (from (Ghana) Mobile Phone People)
25	DF	GHA	Isaac Annan (from (Ghana) AC Sondisco)
31	FW	NOR	Leander Alvheim (promoted from junior squad)

Out: Note: Flags indicate national team as defined under FIFA eligibility rules; some limited exceptions apply. Players may hold more than one non-FIFA nationality.

No.	Pos.	Nation	Player
12	GK	SWE	Elias Hadaya (on loan to Bryne)
15	DF	NOR	Erlend Sivertsen (to (Sweden) Östersund)
16	DF	NOR	Ivar Furu (to Gamle Oslo)
20	FW	USA	Lagos Kunga (to (United States) Kalonji Pro-Profile)
23	MF	NOR	Pål Erik Ulvestad (retired)
36	DF	NOR	Bendik Brevik (on loan to Levanger)
37	FW	NOR	Oskar Sivertsen (on loan to Hødd)
—	MF	NOR	Sander Lille-Løvø (to Arendal, previously on loan at Brattvåg)

=== Summer ===
In: Note: Flags indicate national team as defined under FIFA eligibility rules; some limited exceptions apply. Players may hold more than one non-FIFA nationality.

No.	Pos.	Nation	Player
4	DF	NOR	Henrik Gjesdal (from Start)
16	DF	NOR	Sigurd Kvile (on loan from Bodø/Glimt (second time))
27	FW	NOR	Pawel Chrupalla (on loan from Rosenborg)
29	FW	CMR	Faris Pemi Moumbagna (loan return from (Denmark) SønderjyskE)
32	DF	NOR	Marius Alm (free transfer)
34	DF	NOR	Nikolai Hopland (on loan from Aalesund)
37	FW	NOR	Oskar Sivertsen (loan return from Hødd)

Out: Note: Flags indicate national team as defined under FIFA eligibility rules; some limited exceptions apply. Players may hold more than one non-FIFA nationality.

No.	Pos.	Nation	Player
9	MF	DEN	Agon Muçolli (to (Denmark) Odense)
16	DF	NOR	Sigurd Kvile (loan return to Bodø/Glimt)
22	DF	NOR	Martin Sjølstad (on loan to Kongsvinger)
32	DF	NOR	Marius Alm (to Hødd)
34	DF	NOR	Nikolai Hopland (loan return to Aalesund)
39	MF	NOR	Heine Gikling Bruset (on loan to Levanger)

== Competitions ==
=== Eliteserien ===
==== Results summary ====
Overall								Home						Away					
Pld	W	D	L	GF	GA	GD	Pts	W	D	L	GF	GA	GD	W	D	L	GF	GA	GD
30	5	8	17	37	60	−23	23	4	5	6	27	29	−2	1	3	11	10	31	−21

Last updated: 13 November 2022.

==== Results by round ====
Round	1	2	3	4	5	6	7	8	9	10	11	12	13	14	15	16	17	18	19	20	21	22	23	24	25	26	27	28	29	30
Ground	A	H	A	H	A	H	A	H	A	H	A	H	A	A	H	A	H	A	H	A	H	H	A	H	A	H	A	H	A	H
Result	L	L	L	D	L	L	L	D	L	L	L	L	L	L	D	W	L	L	W	D	W	W	L	D	D	L	L	W	D	D
Position	11	14	15	15	16	16	16	16	16	16	16	16	16	16	16	16	16	16	16	16	16	15	15	15	15	15	15	15	15	15

A = Away; H = Home; W = Win; D = Draw; L = Loss

==== Matches ====
3 April 2022 1	Aalesund	1–0	Kristiansund	Ålesund
18:00 CEST (UTC+2)	Barmen 52'	Report		Stadium: Color Line Stadion; Attendance: 5,246; Referee: Ola Hobber Nilsen

10 April 2022 2	Kristiansund	2–3	Sarpsborg 08	Kristiansund
18:00 CEST (UTC+2)	Diop 52'; Mucolli 79'	Report	Salétros 1'; Maigaard 32'; Molins 42'	Stadium: Kristiansund Stadion; Attendance: 3,636; Referee: Kristoffer Hagenes

18 April 2022 3	Jerv	1–0	Kristiansund	Grimstad
18:00 CEST (UTC+2)	Şimşir 29'	Report		Stadium: J.J. Ugland Stadion – Levermyr; Attendance: 2,412; Referee: Christian Moen

24 April 2022 4	Kristiansund	2–2	HamKam	Kristiansund
18:00 CEST (UTC+2)	Gjertsen 17'; Nilsen 63'	Report	Kuruçay 44'; Yakovenko 85'	Stadium: Kristiansund Stadion; Attendance: 3,827; Referee: Mohammad Usman Aslam

8 May 2022 5	Haugesund	2–0	Kristiansund	Haugesund
18:00 CEST (UTC+2)	Søderlund 2'; Ndour 48'	Report		Stadium: Haugesund Stadion; Attendance: 3,597; Referee: Marius Lien

16 May 2022 6	Kristiansund	0–3	Strømsgodset	Kristiansund
18:00 CEST (UTC+2)		Report	Hove 23', 66'; Salvesen 42'	Stadium: Kristiansund Stadion; Attendance: 4,002; Referee: Christian Moen

21 May 2022 7	Molde	2–1	Kristiansund	Molde
18:00 CEST (UTC+2)	Haugen 7'; Grødem 18'	Report	Bye 90+3'	Stadium: Aker Stadion; Attendance: 6,971; Referee: Tore Hansen

18 June 2022 10	Kristiansund	0–2	Bodø/Glimt	Kristiansund
18:00 CEST (UTC+2)		Report	Pellegrino 53', 72'	Stadium: Kristiansund Stadion; Attendance: 3,700; Referee: Daniel Higraff

25 June 2022 11	Rosenborg	3–1	Kristiansund	Trondheim
18:00 CEST (UTC+2)	Sæter 4', 37', 47'	Report	Diop 19'	Stadium: Lerkendal Stadion; Attendance: 11,843; Referee: Mohammad Usman Aslam

3 July 2022 12	Kristiansund	1–3	Lillestrøm	Kristiansund
18:00 CEST (UTC+2)	Bye 20' (pen.)	Report	Adams 71', 84'; Friðjónsson 87'	Stadium: Kristiansund Stadion; Attendance: 3,660; Referee: Svein Oddvar Moen

10 July 2022 13	Vålerenga	3–0	Kristiansund	Oslo
18:00 CEST (UTC+2)	Udahl 47', 80'; Layouni 54'	Report		Stadium: Intility Arena; Attendance: 5,520; Referee: Marius Lien

17 July 2022 14	Viking	2–1	Kristiansund	Stavanger
18:00 CEST (UTC+2)	Kabran 52'; Sandberg 88' (pen.)	Report	Bye 51'	Stadium: Viking Stadion; Attendance: 7,431; Referee: Kai Erik Steen

24 July 2022 15	Kristiansund	2–2	Odd	Kristiansund
18:00 CEST (UTC+2)	Hopmark 8'; Bye 20'	Report	Jørgensen 46'; Ruud 56'	Stadium: Kristiansund Stadion; Attendance: 3,544; Referee: Tore Hansen

27 July 2022 9	Sandefjord	2–0	Kristiansund	Sandefjord
18:00 CEST (UTC+2)	Ofkir 39'; Ayer 83'	Report		Stadium: Release Arena; Attendance: 2,497; Referee: Svein Oddvar Moen

31 July 2022 16	HamKam	0–1	Kristiansund	Hamar
18:00 CEST (UTC+2)		Report	Aasbak 44'	Stadium: Briskeby Stadion; Attendance: 3,203; Referee: Svein Tore Sinnes

3 August 2022 8	Kristiansund	1–1	Tromsø	Kristiansund
18:00 CEST (UTC+2)	Bye 90+4' (pen.)	Report	Mikkelsen 18'	Stadium: Kristiansund Stadion; Attendance: 3,724; Referee: Kai Erik Steen

7 August 2022 17	Kristiansund	2–3	Molde	Kristiansund
18:00 CEST (UTC+2)	Hopmark 5'; Bye 15'	Report	Haugan 36'; Fofana 45+2' (pen.); Eriksen 48'	Stadium: Kristiansund Stadion; Attendance: 4,304; Referee: Kristoffer Hagenes

14 August 2022 18	Tromsø	2–1	Kristiansund	Tromsø
18:00 CEST (UTC+2)	Yttergård Jenssen 26'; Tuominen 52'	Report	Kartum 68'	Stadium: Alfheim Stadion; Attendance: 2,539; Referee: Mohammad Usman Aslam

28 August 2022 20	Lillestrøm	1–1	Kristiansund	Lillestrøm
18:00 CEST (UTC+2)	Friðjónsson 23'	Report	Williamsen 54'	Stadium: Åråsen Stadion; Attendance: 7,569; Referee: Sivert Øksnes Amland

31 August 2022 19	Kristiansund	2–1	Viking	Kristiansund
19:00 CEST (UTC+2)	Moumbagna 16', 41'	Report	Tripić 39' (pen.)	Stadium: Kristiansund Stadion; Attendance: 3,536; Referee: Tom Harald Hagen

4 September 2022 21	Kristiansund	3–1	Sandefjord	Kristiansund
18:00 CEST (UTC+2)	Moumbagna 38' (pen.); Willumsson 45+2'; Kalludra 86'	Report	Ayer 83'	Stadium: Kristiansund Stadion; Attendance: 3,410; Referee: Christian Moen

11 September 2022 22	Kristiansund	3–2	Vålerenga	Kristiansund
18:00 CEST (UTC+2)	Willumsson 8'; Pemi 63'; Diop 90+4'	Report	Holm 2'; Zuta 73'	Stadium: Kristiansund Stadion; Attendance: 3,653; Referee: Tore Hansen

18 September 2022 23	Strømsgodset	4–1	Kristiansund	Drammen
18:00 CEST (UTC+2)	Hove 14', 67'; Valsvik 45+3'; Friday 77'	Report	Moumbagna 85' (pen.)	Stadium: Marienlyst Stadion; Attendance: 4,933; Referee: Svein Oddvar Moen

2 October 2022 24	Kristiansund	4–4	Rosenborg	Kristiansund
19:00 CEST (UTC+2)	Kartum 24'; Bye 30'; Strand Nilsen 37'; Rogers 90+1' (o.g.)	Report	Cornic 26'; Tengstedt 62', 72'; Jensen 76'	Stadium: Kristiansund Stadion; Attendance: 4,444; Referee: Daniel Higraff

9 October 2022 25	Odd	1–1	Kristiansund	Skien
17:00 CEST (UTC+2)	Jevtović 28' (pen.)	Report	Bye 17'	Stadium: Skagerak Arena; Attendance: 3,720; Referee: Svein Tore Sinnes

16 October 2022 26	Kristiansund	0–1	Haugesund	Kristiansund
17:00 CEST (UTC+2)		Report	Eskesen 12'	Stadium: Kristiansund Stadion; Attendance: 3,578; Referee: Tommy Skjerven

23 October 2022 27	Bodø/Glimt	5–0	Kristiansund	Bodø
17:00 CEST (UTC+2)	Vetlesen 44', 45+1'; Solbakken 53', 58'; Espejord 68'	Report		Stadium: Aspmyra Stadion; Attendance: 6,199; Referee: Kai Erik Steen

30 October 2022 28	Kristiansund	4–0	Aalesund	Kristiansund
17:00 CET (UTC+1)	Williamsen 39'; Willumsson 41' (pen.); Hopland 59' (o.g.); Bye 83'	Report		Stadium: Kristiansund Stadion; Attendance: 3,741; Referee: Marius Lien

6 November 2022 29	Sarpsborg 08	2–2	Kristiansund	Sarpsborg
17:00 CET (UTC+1)	Skålevik 21'; Soltvedt 76'	Report	Diop 23'; Ulvestad 45'	Stadium: Sarpsborg Stadion; Attendance: 4,101; Referee: Sivert Øksnes Amland

13 November 2022 30	Kristiansund	1–1	Jerv	Kristiansund
17:00 CET (UTC+1)	Willumsson 32'	Report	Ugland 7'	Stadium: Kristiansund Stadion; Attendance: 4,150; Referee: Kristoffer Hagenes

==== Table ====
Pos	Team	Pld	W	D	L	GF	GA	GD	Pts	Qualification or relegation
12	Strømsgodset	30	9	6	15	44	55	−11	33	
13	HamKam	30	6	13	11	33	43	−10	31	
14	Sandefjord (O)	30	6	6	18	42	68	−26	24	Qualification for the relegation play-offs
15	Kristiansund (R)	30	5	8	17	37	60	−23	23	Relegation to First Division
16	Jerv (R)	30	5	5	20	30	69	−39	20	Relegation to First Division

Source: Football Association of Norway (in Norwegian)
Rules for classification: 1) Points; 2) Goal difference; 3) Goals scored; 4) Head-to-head points; 5) Head-to-head goal difference; 6) Head-to-head goals scored.
(O) Play-off winners; (R) Relegated

=== Norwegian Football Cup ===
11 May 2022 First round	Surnadal	1–4	Kristiansund	Surnadal
17:45 CEST (UTC+2)	Løfaldli 51'	Report	Rakneberg 14'; Alm 56', 86'; Mawa 62'	Stadium: Syltøran Stadion; Referee: Bendik Haarberg

22 June 2022 Second round	Strindheim	1–3	Kristiansund	Trondheim
18:00 CEST (UTC+2)	Strand 23'	Report	Muçolli 28'; Willumsson 52'; Askar 77'	Stadium: Ruta Arena; Referee: Robert Eggen

12 October 2022 Third round	Viking	1–0 (a.e.t.)	Kristiansund	Stavanger
18:00 CEST (UTC+2)	Brekalo 105'	Report		Stadium: Viking Stadion; Attendance: 3,546; Referee: Steinar Hauge
