= Martin Sjølstad =

Norwegian footballer (born 2000)

Personal information
- Full name: Martin André Sjølstad
- Date of birth: 9 August 2000 (age 26)
- Place of birth: Norway
- Height: 1.80 m (5 ft 11 in)
- Position: Left-back

Team information
- Current team: Randers
- Number: 15

Youth career
- –2013: Drøbak-Frogn
- 2014–2017: Follo

Senior career*
Years	Team	Apps	(Gls)
2016–2019	Follo 2	20	(4)
2017–2019	Follo	52	(9)
2020–2021	Strømmen	41	(1)
2022	Kristiansund	2	(0)
2022	→ Kongsvinger (loan)	16	(1)
2023–2025	Sogndal	84	(4)
2026–	Randers	12	(0)
- * Club domestic league appearances and goals as of 19 May 2026

Martin André Sjølstad (born 9 July 2000) is a Norwegian footballer who plays as a left-back for Danish Superliga club Randers FC.

== Career ==
He moved from Drøbak-Frogn IL to Follo FK as a child, making his senior debut for Follo in the 2017 Second Division. Follo were relegated, and Sjølstad was a regular in the Third Division in 2018 and 2019. He went on trial with Odd in 2018 and Vålerenga in 2019.

He did not sign for a new team in early 2020, but competitive football was postponed. Before the belatede start of the 2020 First Division, Sjølstad was signed by Strømmen.

After the 2021 season, Sjølstad was signed by Eliteserien club Kristiansund who wanted his energy and staying power on the wing back. He made his Eliteserien debut in the second round against Sarpsborg 08, but had only played two matches when Kristiansund decided to loan Sjølstad out to Kongsvinger in the summer.

At the end of 2022, there was a possibility that Kristiansund were relegated and Kongsvinger promoted. Only the first thing happened, and Sjølstad wanted to fight for a place in the team as he returned to Kristiansund, but in February 2023 he was sold to another First Division team Sogndal. He was among Sogndal's most stable players.

On 1 September 2025, the Danish Superliga club Randers FC confirmed that they had signed a pre-contract with Sjølstad, valid from 2026, as his contract with Sogndal expired on 31 December 2025. Sjølstad signed an agreement until June 2028.

== Career statistics ==
As of 11 December 2025

Appearances and goals by club, season and competition
Club	Season	League			National Cup		Europe		Total	
Club	Season	Division	Apps	Goals	Apps	Goals	Apps	Goals	Apps	Goals
Follo 2	2016	3. divisjon	12	0	—		—		12	0
Follo 2	2017	4. divisjon	7	4	—		—		7	4
Follo 2	2019	4. divisjon	1	0	—		—		1	0
Follo 2	Total		20	4	—		—		20	4
Follo	2017	2. divisjon	2	0	0	0	—		2	0
Follo	2018	3. divisjon	25	4	1	0	—		26	4
Follo	2019	3. divisjon	25	5	3	0	—		28	5
Follo	Total		52	9	4	0	—		56	9
Strømmen	2020	1. divisjon	24	1	—		—		24	1
Strømmen	2021	1. divisjon	17	0	2	0	—		19	0
Strømmen	Total		41	1	2	0	—		43	1
Kristiansund	2022	Eliteserien	2	0	1	0	—		3	0
Kongsvinger (loan)	2022	1. divisjon	16	1	0	0	5 (Note: Appearances in Eliteserien play-offs)	0	21	1
Sogndal	2023	1. divisjon	30	2	4	0	—		33	2
Sogndal	2024	1. divisjon	29	0	2	0	—		31	0
Sogndal	2025	1. divisjon	25	2	4	0	—		29	2
Sogndal	Total		84	4	10	0	—		94	4
Career total			215	19	17	0	5	0	237	19
