= Marius Alm =

Norwegian footballer (born 1997)

Personal information
- Full name: Marius Svanberg Alm
- Date of birth: 3 December 1997 (age 28)
- Height: 1.97 m (6 ft 6 in)
- Position: Centre-back

Team information
- Current team: Skreia IL

Youth career
- Moen
- –2013: Gran
- 2015–2016: Raufoss

Senior career*
Years	Team	Apps	(Gls)
2013–2014	Gran	27	(0)
2015–2021	Raufoss	118	(9)
2021	KFUM	5	(0)
2022	Kristiansund	3	(0)
2022–2023	Hødd	39	(0)
2024	Raufoss	17	(0)
2025–	Skreia	25	(2)
- * Club domestic league appearances and goals as of 27 July 2026

Marius Alm (born 3 December 1997) is a footballer who plays as a centre-back for Skreia IL. He played over 100 games in the Norwegian First Division as well as briefly in the Eliteserien.

== Career ==
Alm grew up on a farm in Moen, Innlandet. Having started as a child in Moen SK, he continued playing for children's teams in Gran IL, where he then made his senior debut in the Fourth Division in 2013. He then moved to Toten, attending Lena Upper Secondary School, and joined Raufoss IL in 2015, where his first senior match was a friendly in February 2015. He made his league debut in June 2015, and was a regular player from 2017.

Following many years in Raufoss, his contract expired in the summer of 2021. Alm wanted to chase opportunities elsewhere, sold his apartment in Gjøvik and was released by the club. Some weeks passed, but he was eventually picked up by KFUM and took part in the latter half of the 2021 1. divisjon in addition to playoff matches.

Hunting a new club in 2022, Alm trained with Gjøvik-Lyn and was described as being more or less ready to sign. However, he sat out the transfer deadline. During the 2022 Kristiansund BK season, the team experienced injury to several central defenders. Due to this, Alm was signed on a short-term contract in May 2022. On 16 May, Alm made his Eliteserien debut at the age of 24. He was however let go when some of the other centre-backs returned from injury. Alm remained in Møre as he signed for IL Hødd.

Ahead of the 2023 season, Alm trained with Raufoss again, but took another season for Hødd as that team had achieved promotion to the First Division. A year later, Alm finally reunited with Raufoss. In 2025 he stepped down to the Fourth Division with Skreia IL.

His style of play was marked by his tall stature, 1.97 metres. He modelled his play after Giorgio Chiellini and Alessandro Nesta.
