= David Agbo =

Ghanaian footballer

Personal information
- Date of birth: 1 April 2000 (age 26)
- Height: 1.72 m (5 ft 8 in)
- Position: Midfielder

Team information
- Current team: Ekenäs IF
- Number: 19

Youth career
- Aspire Academy
- Mobile Phone People FC

Senior career*
Years	Team	Apps	(Gls)
2022–2023	Kristiansund	15	(0)
2022–2023	Kristiansund 2	14	(1)
2023	Inter Turku	6	(0)
2024	Gnistan	18	(0)
2025–	Ekenäs IF	31	(4)
- * Club domestic league appearances and goals as of 1 November 2026

David Agbo (born 1 April 2000) is a Ghanaian footballer who plays as a midfielder for Ykkösliiga side Ekenäs IF.

== Career ==
In March 2022, he signed a three-year contract with Norwegian side Kristiansund. On 10 April 2022, he made his Eliteserien debut in a 3–2 loss against Sarpsborg 08.

On 5 August 2023, Agbo transferred to Finland and signed with Inter Turku on a deal until the end of 2024 with an option to extend, for an undisclosed fee.

On 22 January 2024, Agbo joined newly promoted Veikkausliiga club IF Gnistan.

== Career statistics ==
As of 28 June 2025

Appearances and goals by club, season and competition
Club	Season	League			National cup (Note: Includes Norwegian Football Cup and Suomen Cup)		League cup		Europe		Total	
Club	Season	Division	Apps	Goals	Apps	Goals	Apps	Goals	Apps	Goals	Apps	Goals
Kristiansund	2022	Eliteserien	12	0	3	0	–		–		15	0
Kristiansund	2023	1. divisjon	3	0	2	0	–		–		5	0
Kristiansund	Total		15	0	5	0	0	0	0	0	20	0
Kristiansund 2	2022	4. divisjon	8	0	–		–		–		8	0
Kristiansund 2	2023	3. divisjon	6	1	–		–		–		6	1
Kristiansund 2	Total		14	1	0	0	0	0	0	0	14	1
Inter Turku	2023	Veikkausliiga	6	0	–		–		–		6	0
Gnistan	2024	Veikkausliiga	18	0	2	0	5	1	–		25	1
Ekenäs IF	2025	Ykkösliiga	9	2	5	0	–		–		14	2
Career total			62	3	12	0	5	1	0	0	79	4
