= Joacim Holtan =

Norwegian footballer (born 1998)

Personal information
- Full name: Joacim Emil Godhei Holtan
- Date of birth: 8 August 1998 (age 28)
- Place of birth: Vennesla Municipality, Norway
- Height: 1.75 m (5 ft 9 in)
- Position: Forward

Team information
- Current team: Afturelding
- Number: 9

Youth career
- –2017: Start

Senior career*
Years	Team	Apps	(Gls)
2018	Torridal	7	(7)
2018–2019	Mandalskameratene	30	(38)
2020–2021	Bryne	47	(26)
2022–2023	Haugesund	14	(0)
2022	→ Start (loan)	7	(6)
2023	→ Kongsvinger (loan)	15	(9)
2023–2026	Kongsvinger	40	(6)
2024	→ Egersund (loan)	16	(6)
2026–	Afturelding	21	(16)
- * Club domestic league appearances and goals as of 12 September 2026

Joacim Emil Godhei Holtan (born 8 August 1998) is a Norwegian footballer who plays as a forward for 1. deild karla club Afturelding.

== Career ==
Holtan started his career with Start, where he did not manage to break through to the first team. He instead joined sixth-tier Torridal in 2018. Having scored seven goals in seven games, he was snapped up by fifth-tier Mandalskameratene later that year. After two seasons with Mandalskameratene, he moved to third-tier Bryne in 2020. He spent another two seasons at Bryne, before signing a four-year contract with first-tier Haugesund in March 2022. On 3 April 2022, he made his Eliteserien debut in a 3–1 loss against Sandefjord.

In February 2023, he signed for Kongsvinger on loan for the 2023 season with the option to buy. On 29 June 2023, Kongsvinger made the loan-deal permanent with Holtan, starting from 1 August 2023.

== Career statistics ==
As of match played 23 August 2025

Appearances and goals by club, season and competition
Club	Season	League			Cup		Other		Total	
Club	Season	Division	Apps	Goals	Apps	Goals	Apps	Goals	Apps	Goals
Torridal	2018	Fifth Division	7	7	—		—		7	7
Mandalskameratene	2018	Fourth Division	6	12	0	0	—		6	12
Mandalskameratene	2019	Third Division	24	26	0	0	—		24	26
Mandalskameratene	Total		30	38	0	0	—		30	38
Bryne	2020	Second Division	17	15	—		—		17	15
Bryne	2021	First Division	30	11	3	4	—		33	15
Bryne	Total		47	26	3	4	—		50	30
Haugesund	2022	Eliteserien	14	0	1	0	—		15	0
Start (loan)	2022	First Division	7	6	0	0	1 (Note: Appearance in promotion play-offs)	0	8	6
Kongsvinger	2023	First Division	27	11	2	2	1 (Note: Appearance in promotion play-offs)	0	30	13
Kongsvinger	2024	First Division	7	0	0	0	0	0	7	0
Kongsvinger	2025	First Division	13	2	4	4	0	0	17	6
Kongsvinger	Total		47	13	6	6	1	0	54	19
Egersund (loan)	2024	First Division	16	6	0	0	1 (Note: Appearance in promotion play-offs)	0	17	6
Career total			168	96	10	10	3	0	181	106
