= Nikolai Hopland =

Norwegian footballer (born 2004)

Personal information
- Full name: Nikolai Søyset Hopland
- Date of birth: 24 July 2004 (age 22)
- Height: 1.86 m (6 ft 1 in)
- Position: Centre-back

Team information
- Current team: Randers
- Number: 27

Youth career
- –2016: Aalesund
- 2016–2018: Rollon
- 2019–2021: Aalesund

Senior career*
Years	Team	Apps	(Gls)
2021–2025	Aalesund	67	(1)
2021–2023	Aalesund 2	14	(2)
2022	→ Kristiansund (loan)	2	(0)
2024–2025	→ Heerenveen (loan)	29	(2)
2025–2026	Heerenveen	19	(1)
2026–	Randers	0	(0)

International career^{‡}
2021	Norway U17	2	(0)
2021–2022	Norway U18	7	(0)
2022–2023	Norway U19	15	(0)
2023–	Norway U21	7	(0)
- * Club domestic league appearances and goals as of 3 September 2026 ‡ National team caps and goals as of 29 September 2026

Nikolai Søyset Hopland (born 24 July 2004) is a Norwegian footballer who plays as a centre-back for Danish Superliga side Randers.

== Club career ==
Hopland began his career with Aalesund, before representing a joint Aalesund and Rollon team in 2016. He continued to play for Rollon for the next two years, also representing the club in children's futsal at the same time.

He returned to Aalesund in 2019, and progressed through the academy to make his debut in the 2021 season. The following season, following Aalesund's promotion to the Eliteserien, he was loaned to Kristiansund. The loan was not successful, and he only made two appearances before returning to Aalesund. He scored his first goal for Aalesund on 6 November 2022, the winning goal in a 2–1 Eliteserien victory over Lillestrøm.

On 2 September 2024, Hopland moved to Heerenveen in the Netherlands on loan with an option to buy.

On 31 August 2026, Hopland joined Danish side Randers FC on a four-year contract.

== International career ==
Hopland has represented Norway at under-17, under-18 and under-19 level.

== Career statistics ==
=== Club ===
As of 21 May 2023.

Club	Season	League			Cup		Continental		Other		Total	
Club	Season	Division	Apps	Goals	Apps	Goals	Apps	Goals	Apps	Goals	Apps	Goals
Aalesund	2021	OBOS-ligaen	14	0	3 (Note: Appearances in the Norwegian Cup)	1	–		0	0	17	1
Aalesund	2022	Eliteserien	17	1	2	0	–		0	0	19	1
Aalesund	2023	Eliteserien	8	0	0	0	–		0	0	8	0
Aalesund	Total		39	1	5	1	0	0	0	0	44	2
Aalesund 2	2021	3. divisjon	5	1	–		–		0	0	5	1
Aalesund 2	2022	3. divisjon	8	1	–		–		0	0	8	1
Aalesund 2	Total		13	2	0	0	0	0	0	0	13	2
Kristiansund (loan)	2022	Eliteserien	2	0	0	0	–		0	0	2	0
Career total			54	3	5	1	0	0	0	0	59	4
