= Isaac Annan =

Ghanaian footballer (born 2001)

Personal information
- Date of birth: 9 September 2001 (age 25)
- Height: 1.78 m (5 ft 10 in)
- Position: Defender

Team information
- Current team: Loyola
- Number: 16

Senior career*
Years	Team	Apps	(Gls)
2022–2023	Kristiansund	6	(0)
2024–	Loyola	0	(0)
- * Club domestic league appearances and goals as of 10 December 2023

Isaac Annan (born 9 September 2001) is a Ghanaian professional footballer who last played as a defender for Loyola.

== Career ==
In March 2022, he signed a three-year contract with Norwegian side Kristiansund. On 10 April 2022, he made his Eliteserien debut in a 3–2 loss against Sarpsborg 08.
