= Kristoffer Hoven =

Norwegian footballer (born 1996)

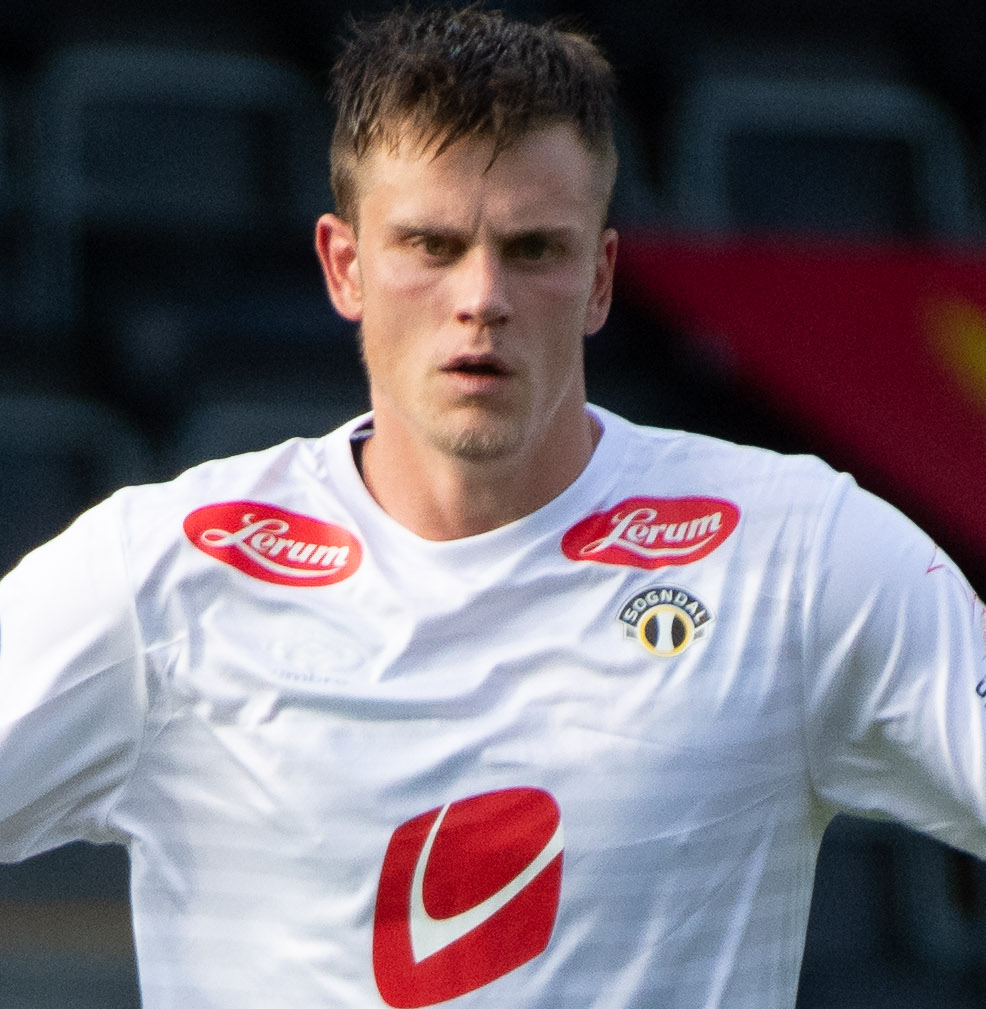
- Hoven with Sogndal in 2020

Personal information
- Date of birth: 10 August 1996 (age 30)
- Height: 1.93 m (6 ft 4 in)
- Position: Striker

Team information
- Current team: Hønefoss
- Number: 10

Youth career
- Strømsgodset

Senior career*
Years	Team	Apps	(Gls)
2016–2017	Strømsgodset	2	(0)
2017–2018	Hønefoss	42	(31)
2019	Kristiansund	6	(1)
2019–2022	Sogndal	76	(26)
2022	→ Skeid (loan)	6	(3)
2023	Skeid	15	(5)
2023	Varberg	11	(0)
2024	Kauno Žalgiris	3	(0)
2024	Start	21	(3)
2025–	Hønefoss	13	(2)
- * Club domestic league appearances and goals as of 15 November 2026

Kristoffer Hoven (born 10 August 1996) is a Norwegian football striker who plays for Hønefoss.

He is a son of the track and field athletes Anders Hoven and Anne-Beth Hoven, and together with his brother Andreas Hoven he signed for Strømsgodset's first team in 2016. He appeared once in the league and once in the cup. In the early summer of 2017 he went on to Hønefoss BK, where he scored double digits. Ahead of the 2019 season he returned to the first tier with Kristiansund BK, only to move on to Sogndal in the summer of 2019.

== Career statistics ==
=== Club ===
As of match played 12 March 2024

Appearances and goals by club, season and competition
Club	Season	League			National Cup		Continental		Total	
Club	Season	Division	Apps	Goals	Apps	Goals	Apps	Goals	Apps	Goals
Strømsgodset	2016	Eliteserien	2	0	1	0	-		3	0
Strømsgodset	Total		2	0	1	0	-	-	3	0
Hønefoss	2017	2. divisjon	18	12	0	0	-		18	12
Hønefoss	2018	2. divisjon	24	19	1	0	-		25	19
Hønefoss	Total		42	31	1	0	-	-	43	31
Kristiansund	2019	Eliteserien	6	1	3	0	-		9	1
Kristiansund	Total		6	1	3	0	-	-	9	1
Sogndal	2019	1. divisjon	6	1	0	0	-		6	1
Sogndal	2020	1. divisjon	30	17	-		-		30	17
Sogndal	2021	1. divisjon	25	7	3	5	-		28	12
Sogndal	2022	1. divisjon	15	1	2	2	-		17	3
Sogndal	Total		76	26	5	7	-	-	81	33
Skeid (loan)	2022	1. divisjon	6	3	0	0	-		6	3
Skeid	2023	1. divisjon	15	5	1	0	-		16	5
Skeid	Total		21	8	1	0	-	-	22	8
Varbergs BoIS	2023	Allsvenskan	11	0	1	0	-		12	0
Varbergs BoIS	Total		11	0	1	0	-	-	12	0
Kauno Žalgiris	2024	A Lyga	3	0	0	0	-		3	0
Kauno Žalgiris	Total		3	0	0	0	-	-	3	0
Start	2024	1. divisjon	0	0	0	0	-		0	0
Start	Total		0	0	0	0	-	-	0	0
Career total			161	66	12	7	-	-	173	73
