= Sigurd Kvile =

Norwegian footballer (born 2000)

Personal information
- Date of birth: 26 February 2000 (age 26)
- Place of birth: Bergen, Norway
- Height: 1.87 m (6 ft 2 in)
- Position: Centre-back

Team information
- Current team: Fredrikstad
- Number: 17

Youth career
- –2015: Fyllingsdalen
- 2015–2016: Brann
- 2017–2018: Fana
- 2018–2020: Sarpsborg 08

Senior career*
Years	Team	Apps	(Gls)
2018	Fana	2	(0)
2020	Åsane	12	(0)
2021–2023	Bodø/Glimt	11	(0)
2022	→ Kristiansund (loan)	1	(0)
2022	→ Kristiansund (loan)	3	(0)
2023	→ Sarpsborg 08 (loan)	4	(0)
2023	→ Fredrikstad (loan)	6	(0)
2024–	Fredrikstad	35	(1)
- * Club domestic league appearances and goals as of 23 July 2026

Sigurd Kvile (born 26 February 2000) is a Norwegian professional footballer who plays as a centre-back for Fredrikstad.

== Career ==
Kvile moved FK Fyllingsdalen to SK Brann as a youth player, also moving on to Fana IL and briefly making his senior debut before joining the junior ranks of Sarpsborg 08. In the summer of 2020 he finally made his senior breakthrough as he joined Åsane, and impressed enough to be picked up by reigning league champions FK Bodø/Glimt in 2021. Kvile made his Eliteserien debut in May 2021 against Tromsø.

Kvile started 2022 by playing two matches in the postponed 2021–22 Norwegian Football Cup, as well as three of the 2021–22 UEFA Europa Conference League. On 6 May 2022 he was loaned to Eliteserien competitors Kristiansund for the remainder of May. Already in his first game, he sustained an injury, and had to undergo surgery at Haukeland Hospital. Upon returning from injury, he featured once for Bodø/Glimt. On 30 September, he was loaned to Kristiansund a second time.

On 31 August 2023, Kvile moved to OBOS-ligaen side Fredrikstad on loan for the rest of 2023, with option to make it permanent after the season. When Fredrikstad won the 1. divisjon that season, the deal automatically became permanent from January 1.

== Career statistics ==
=== Club ===
As of 6 November 2025

Appearances and goals by club, season and competition
Club	Season	League			National Cup		Other		Total	
Club	Season	Division	Apps	Goals	Apps	Goals	Apps	Goals	Apps	Goals
Fana	2018	3. divisjon	2	0	0	0	—		2	0
Fana	Total		2	0	0	0	—		2	0
Åsane	2020	1. divisjon	12	0	—		2 (Note: Appearances in the Eliteserien play-offs)	0	14	0
Åsane	Total		12	0	0	0	2	0	14	0
Bodø/Glimt	2021	Eliteserien	10	0	2	1	2 (Note: One appearance in UEFA Champions League, one appearance in UEFA Europa Conference League)	0	14	1
Bodø/Glimt	2022	Eliteserien	1	0	2	0	3 (Note: Appearances in UEFA Europa Conference League)	0	6	0
Bodø/Glimt	Total		11	0	4	1	5	0	20	1
Kristiansund (loan)	2022	Eliteserien	4	0	1	0	—		5	0
Kristiansund (loan)	Total		4	0	1	0	—		5	0
Sarpsborg 08 (loan)	2023	Eliteserien	4	0	3	0	—		7	0
Sarpsborg 08 (loan)	Total		4	0	3	0	—		7	0
Fredrikstad (loan)	2023	1. divisjon	6	0	0	0	—		6	0
Fredrikstad	2024	Eliteserien	24	1	5	0	0	0	29	1
Fredrikstad	2025	Eliteserien	6	0	0	0	2 (Note: Appearances in UEFA Europa Conference League)	0	8	0
Fredrikstad	Total		36	1	5	0	4	0	43	1
Career total			69	1	13	1	9	0	91	2

== Honours ==
Bodø/Glimt

- Eliteserien: 2021

Fredrikstad

- Norwegian Cup: 2024
