= Mamadou Diaw =

Senegalese footballer (born 2001)

Personal information
- Date of birth: 2 January 2001 (age 25)
- Position: Midfielder

Team information
- Current team: Keflavík
- Number: 7

Senior career*
Years	Team	Apps	(Gls)
2020–2023	Aalesund	28	(0)
2022	→ Bryne (loan)	8	(1)
2023	→ Bryne (loan)	13	(4)
2023	→ Sandnes (loan)	12	(0)
2024–	Keflavík	15	(1)
- * Club domestic league appearances and goals as of 2 November 2024

Mamadou Diaw (born 2 January 2001) is a Senegalese professional football midfielder who plays for Keflavík.

He travelled to Ålesund in the early spring of 2020 for a two or three week trial at Aalesunds FK. The subsequent COVID-19-related lockdown closed the opportunity for Diaw to return to Senegal. He was accepted as a student at Ålesund Folk High School and continued training. Aalesund eventually desired to sign him, and finally cleared the paperwork in October 2020.

Diaw made his Eliteserien debut in October 2020 against Haugesund, one of the few games Aalesund won. Following relegation he became a semi-regular in the 2021 1. divisjon, and scored his first goal in the 2021 Norwegian Football Cup against Ranheim.
