= List of Norwegian football transfers summer 2020 =

This is a list of Norwegian football transfers in the 2020 summer transfer window by club. Only clubs of the 2020 Eliteserien and 2020 1. divisjon are included.

Before the winter transfer window ended on 31 March 2020, Norwegian football was in corona lockdown, and it was decided to open the summer transfer window for two separate periods. One from 10 June to 30 June, before the commencing of league play 16 June, and a second period to be in September. This list includes both transfer windows.

In addition, Norwegian clubs may promote players from their junior ranks at any time. Players aged 18–22 may also be loaned out and recalled from loan at any time, provided certain criteria are met.

== Eliteserien ==
=== Aalesund ===
In: Note: Flags indicate national team as defined under FIFA eligibility rules; some limited exceptions apply. Players may hold more than one non-FIFA nationality.

| No. | Pos. | Nation | Player |
|---|---|---|---|
| 17 | FW | SEN | Mamadou Diaw |
| 21 | DF | DEN | Kasper Jørgensen (on loan from (Denmark) Lyngby) |
| 22 | FW | NOR | Sigurd Haugen (from (Belgium) Union SG) |
| 27 | DF | NOR | Sigurd Tafjord (from Spjelkavik) |
| 39 | DF | CIV | Benjamin Karamoko (on loan from Haugesund) |
| 41 | MF | NOR | Markus Karlsbakk (loan return from Hødd) |

Out: Note: Flags indicate national team as defined under FIFA eligibility rules; some limited exceptions apply. Players may hold more than one non-FIFA nationality.

| No. | Pos. | Nation | Player |
|---|---|---|---|
| 3 | DF | ISL | Daníel Leó Grétarsson (to (England) Blackpool) |
| 10 | FW | ISL | Hólmbert Friðjónsson (to (Italy) Brescia) |
| 14 | MF | ENG | Jordon Mutch (released) |
| 17 | MF | NOR | Sondre Brunstad Fet (on loan to Bodø/Glimt) |
| 28 | DF | NOR | Håvard Mork Breivik (on loan to Hødd) |

=== Bodø/Glimt ===
In: Note: Flags indicate national team as defined under FIFA eligibility rules; some limited exceptions apply. Players may hold more than one non-FIFA nationality.

| No. | Pos. | Nation | Player |
|---|---|---|---|
| 1 | GK | NED | Joshua Smits (from (Netherlands) Almere City) |
| 4 | DF | NOR | Marius Høibråten (from Sandefjord) |
| 15 | MF | NOR | Runar Hauge (loan return from Grorud) |
| 19 | MF | NOR | Sondre Brunstad Fet (on loan from Aalesund) |
| 22 | MF | NOR | Vegard Leikvoll Moberg (from (Denmark) Silkeborg) |
| 23 | MF | NOR | Elias Kristoffersen Hagen (from Grorud) |

Out: Note: Flags indicate national team as defined under FIFA eligibility rules; some limited exceptions apply. Players may hold more than one non-FIFA nationality.

| No. | Pos. | Nation | Player |
|---|---|---|---|
| 4 | DF | NOR | Vegard Bergan (to Start) |
| 9 | FW | NOR | Endre Kupen (to Sogndal) |
| 11 | MF | NOR | Jens Petter Hauge (to (Italy) Milan) |
| 15 | MF | NOR | Runar Hauge (on loan to Grorud) |
| 19 | FW | FRA | Amadou Konaté (to (France) Cholet, previously on loan at (France) Lyon-Duchère) |
| 20 | MF | DEN | Sammy Skytte (to Stabæk) |
| 22 | FW | NOR | Ole Amund Sveen (to Mjøndalen) |
| 33 | FW | NOR | William Moan Mikalsen (to HamKam) |
| 35 | MF | NOR | Adan Abadala Hussein (on loan to Stjørdals/Blink) |
| 37 | MF | NOR | Ask Tjærandsen-Skau (on loan to Stjørdals/Blink) |

=== Brann ===
In: Note: Flags indicate national team as defined under FIFA eligibility rules; some limited exceptions apply. Players may hold more than one non-FIFA nationality.

| No. | Pos. | Nation | Player |
|---|---|---|---|
| 3 | DF | NOR | Vegard Forren (from Molde) |
| 4 | DF | ISL | Jón Gudni Fjóluson (from (Russia) FC Krasnodar) |
| 7 | MF | NOR | Mathias Rasmussen (from (Denmark) Nordsjælland) |
| 18 | DF | NOR | Ole Didrik Blomberg (from Åsane) |
| 22 | DF | NOR | Vegard Strønen Skeie (from Os) |
| 27 | MF | NOR | Sander Svendsen (on loan from (Denmark) OB) |
| 30 | GK | COM | Ali Ahamada (from Kongsvinger) |

Out: Note: Flags indicate national team as defined under FIFA eligibility rules; some limited exceptions apply. Players may hold more than one non-FIFA nationality.

| No. | Pos. | Nation | Player |
|---|---|---|---|
| 4 | DF | NOR | Christian Eggen Rismark (to Ranheim) |
| 7 | FW | GHA | Gilbert Koomson (to (Turkey) Kasımpaşa) |
| 12 | GK | NOR | Eirik Johansen (on loan to Kristiansund) |
| 22 | DF | NOR | Vegard Strønen Skeie (on loan to Øygarden) |
| 35 | MF | NOR | David Møller Wolfe (on loan to Åsane) |
| 39 | FW | NOR | Aune Heggebø (on loan to Øygarden) |
| 44 | GK | GER | Ralf Fährmann (loan return to (Germany) Schalke 04) |

=== Haugesund ===
In: Note: Flags indicate national team as defined under FIFA eligibility rules; some limited exceptions apply. Players may hold more than one non-FIFA nationality.

| No. | Pos. | Nation | Player |
|---|---|---|---|
| 9 | FW | MLI | Ibrahima Koné (loan return from (Turkey) Adana Demirspor) |
| 12 | GK | CZE | Ludek Vejmola (on loan from (Czech Republic) Vysočina Jihlava) |
| 20 | FW | DEN | Oliver Klitten (on loan from (Denmark) AaB) |
| 21 | DF | DEN | Peter Therkildsen (on loan from (Denmark) Horsens) |

Out: Note: Flags indicate national team as defined under FIFA eligibility rules; some limited exceptions apply. Players may hold more than one non-FIFA nationality.

| No. | Pos. | Nation | Player |
|---|---|---|---|
| 3 | DF | CIV | Benjamin Karamoko (on loan to (Norway) Aalesund) |
| 9 | FW | FIN | Benjamin Källman (loan return to (Finland) Inter Turku) |
| 14 | FW | NOR | Torbjørn Kallevåg (to (Norway) Lillestrøm) |
| 21 | FW | NGR | Shuaibu Ibrahim (to (Norway) Mjøndalen) |
| 27 | MF | NOR | Mads Berg Sande (on loan to (Norway) Sandnes Ulf) |

=== Kristiansund ===
In: Note: Flags indicate national team as defined under FIFA eligibility rules; some limited exceptions apply. Players may hold more than one non-FIFA nationality.

| No. | Pos. | Nation | Player |
|---|---|---|---|
| 8 | MF | SEN | Amidou Diop (from (Turkey) Adanaspor) |
| 14 | MF | NOR | Horenus Tadesse (loan return from (Norway) Sandnes Ulf) |
| 25 | GK | NOR | Eirik Johansen (on loan from (Norway) Brann) |
| 28 | MF | NOR | Noah Solskjær (promoted from junior squad) |
| 29 | FW | CMR | Faris Pemi Moumbagna (free transfer) |
| 33 | DF | NOR | Kjetil Holand Tøsse (from (Norway) Notodden) |

Out: Note: Flags indicate national team as defined under FIFA eligibility rules; some limited exceptions apply. Players may hold more than one non-FIFA nationality.

| No. | Pos. | Nation | Player |
|---|---|---|---|
| 8 | MF | NOR | Olav Øby (to (Norway) KFUM) |
| 14 | MF | NOR | Horenus Tadesse (on loan to (Norway) Sandnes Ulf) |
| 15 | DF | NOR | Erlend Sivertsen (on loan to (Norway) Tromsø) |
| 27 | MF | NOR | Sander Lille-Løvø (on loan to (Norway) Levanger) |
| 30 | GK | SEN | Serigne Mor Mbaye (on loan to (Norway) HamKam) |

=== Mjøndalen ===
In: Note: Flags indicate national team as defined under FIFA eligibility rules; some limited exceptions apply. Players may hold more than one non-FIFA nationality.

| No. | Pos. | Nation | Player |
|---|---|---|---|
| 13 | GK | NOR | Gard Thomas (promoted from junior squad) |
| 17 | MF | NOR | Martin Rønning Ovenstad (free transfer) |
| 19 | FW | NOR | Magnus Bækken (loan return from (Norway) Notodden) |
| 20 | MF | GHA | Isaac Twum (from (Norway) Start) |
| 22 | FW | NGR | Shuaibu Ibrahim (from (Norway) Haugesund) |
| 24 | FW | NOR | Ole Amund Sveen (from (Norway) Bodø/Glimt) |
| 26 | MF | NOR | Syver Skaar Eriksen (promoted from junior squad) |
| 27 | DF | NOR | Adrian Hansen (promoted from junior squad) |
| 31 | FW | NOR | Erik Stavås Skistad (from Konnerud) |

Out: Note: Flags indicate national team as defined under FIFA eligibility rules; some limited exceptions apply. Players may hold more than one non-FIFA nationality.

| No. | Pos. | Nation | Player |
|---|---|---|---|
| 19 | FW | NOR | Magnus Bækken (on loan to Notodden) |
| 20 | DF | NGR | Akeem Latifu (to Jerv) |
| 21 | FW | NOR | Alfred Scriven (on loan to Asker) |
| 27 | DF | NOR | Adrian Hansen (on loan to Fram Larvik) |

=== Molde ===
In: Note: Flags indicate national team as defined under FIFA eligibility rules; some limited exceptions apply. Players may hold more than one non-FIFA nationality.

| No. | Pos. | Nation | Player |
|---|---|---|---|
| 3 | DF | NOR | Birk Risa (from Odd) |
| 5 | DF | GAM | Sheriff Sinyan (from Lillestrøm) |
| 22 | MF | NOR | Ola Brynhildsen (from Stabæk) |
| 26 | GK | NOR | Mathias Eriksen Ranmark (loan return from HamKam) |

Out: Note: Flags indicate national team as defined under FIFA eligibility rules; some limited exceptions apply. Players may hold more than one non-FIFA nationality.

| No. | Pos. | Nation | Player |
|---|---|---|---|
| 3 | DF | NOR | Martin Ove Roseth (to Sogndal) |
| 5 | DF | NOR | Vegard Forren (to Brann) |
| 21 | MF | NOR | Tobias Svendsen (to HamKam) |
| 25 | DF | NOR | John Kitolano (loan return to (England) Wolverhampton Wanderers) |
| 50 | FW | NOR | Jakob Ørsahl (on loan to Raufoss, previously on loan at (Norway) Notodden) |

=== Odd ===
In: Note: Flags indicate national team as defined under FIFA eligibility rules; some limited exceptions apply. Players may hold more than one non-FIFA nationality.

| No. | Pos. | Nation | Player |
|---|---|---|---|
| 4 | DF | DEN | Rasmus Minor Petersen (from (Denmark) Hobro) |
| 5 | DF | NOR | John Kitolano (on loan from (England) Wolverhampton Wanderers) |
| 7 | MF | DEN | Kasper Lunding (on loan from (Denmark) AGF Aarhus) |
| 7 | MF | MNE | Vladimir Rodić (on loan from (Sweden) Hammarby) |
| 9 | FW | NOR | Mushaga Bakenga (free transfer) |
| 15 | MF | NOR | Eirik Asante Gayi (promoted from junior squad) |
| 22 | FW | SWE | Robin Simović (from (Italy) Livorno) |

Out: Note: Flags indicate national team as defined under FIFA eligibility rules; some limited exceptions apply. Players may hold more than one non-FIFA nationality.

| No. | Pos. | Nation | Player |
|---|---|---|---|
| 5 | DF | NOR | Birk Risa (to (Norway) Molde) |
| 7 | MF | DEN | Kasper Lunding (loan return to (Denmark) AGF) |
| 19 | MF | NOR | Bilal Njie (to (Norway) KFUM) |
| 22 | FW | NOR | Torgeir Børven (to (Norway) Rosenborg) |

=== Rosenborg ===
In: Note: Flags indicate national team as defined under FIFA eligibility rules; some limited exceptions apply. Players may hold more than one non-FIFA nationality.

| No. | Pos. | Nation | Player |
|---|---|---|---|
| 5 | MF | NOR | Per Ciljan Skjelbred (from (Germany) Hertha BSC) |
| 7 | MF | NOR | Markus Henriksen (from (England) Hull City) |
| 14 | FW | NOR | Torgeir Børven (from (Norway) Odd) |
| 14 | FW | SWE | Rasmus Wiedesheim-Paul (from (Sweden) Halmstad) |
| 15 | DF | ISL | Hólmar Örn Eyjólfsson (from (Bulgaria) Levski Sofia) |
| 23 | MF | NOR | Filip Brattbakk (promoted from junior squad) |
| 25 | DF | GUI | Pa Konate (from (Sweden) Jönköpings Södra) |
| 26 | DF | NOR | Warren Kamanzi (promoted from junior squad) |

Out: Note: Flags indicate national team as defined under FIFA eligibility rules; some limited exceptions apply. Players may hold more than one non-FIFA nationality.

| No. | Pos. | Nation | Player |
|---|---|---|---|
| 3 | DF | NOR | Birger Meling (to (France) Nîmes) |
| 14 | FW | NOR | Torgeir Børven (to (Turkey) Ankaragücü) |
| 15 | MF | NOR | Anders Trondsen (to (Turkey) Trabzonspor) |
| 19 | DF | NOR | Gustav Valsvik (on loan to (Norway) Stabæk) |
| 23 | MF | NOR | Filip Brattbakk (on loan to (Norway) Raufoss) |
| 25 | MF | NOR | Marius Lundemo (to (Cyprus) APOEL) |
| 30 | DF | NGR | Igoh Ogbu (to (Norway) Sogndal, previously on loan) |
| 34 | FW | NOR | Erik Botheim (on loan to (Norway) Stabæk) |
| 37 | MF | NOR | Mikael Tørset Johnsen (on loan to (Netherlands) Feyenoord U21) |
| 39 | DF | NOR | Sondre Skogen (on loan to (Netherlands) Feyenoord U21) |
| 41 | DF | NOR | Franklin Daddys Boy Nyenetue (to (Norway) Stjørdals-Blink) |

=== Sandefjord ===
In: Note: Flags indicate national team as defined under FIFA eligibility rules; some limited exceptions apply. Players may hold more than one non-FIFA nationality.

| No. | Pos. | Nation | Player |
|---|---|---|---|
| 5 | DF | AUT | Martin Kreuzriegler (from (Austria) Blau-Weiß Linz) |
| 7 | FW | ESP | Marcos Celorrio (from (Spain) Real Sociedad B) |
| 12 | DF | NOR | Mats Haakenstad (from (Finland) KuPS) |
| 13 | DF | NOR | Lars Markmanrud (promoted from junior squad) |
| 22 | FW | CRC | Deyver Vega (from (Norway) Vålerenga) |
| 24 | MF | NOR | Harmeet Singh (from (Finland) HJK) |
| 31 | MF | NOR | Peder Meen Johansen (promoted from junior squad) |

Out: Note: Flags indicate national team as defined under FIFA eligibility rules; some limited exceptions apply. Players may hold more than one non-FIFA nationality.

| No. | Pos. | Nation | Player |
|---|---|---|---|
| 13 | DF | NOR | Marius Høibråten (to (Norway) Bodø/Glimt) |
| 22 | DF | NOR | Herman Solberg Nilsen (on loan to (Norway) Kongsvinger) |
| 24 | MF | NOR | Martin Andersen (on loan to Fram) |

=== Sarpsborg 08 ===
In: Note: Flags indicate national team as defined under FIFA eligibility rules; some limited exceptions apply. Players may hold more than one non-FIFA nationality.

| No. | Pos. | Nation | Player |
|---|---|---|---|
| 10 | FW | SWE | Guillermo Molins (from (Sweden) Malmö FF) |
| 12 | GK | CAN | Simon Thomas (from (Norway) KFUM Oslo) |
| 14 | MF | NOR | Tobias Heintz (on loan from (Turkey) Kasımpaşa) |
| 20 | MF | SWE | Anton Salétros (from (Russia) Rostov, previously on loan) |
| 21 | MF | BEN | Jordan Adéoti (from (France) Auxerre) |
| 22 | DF | GUI | Mikael Dyrestam (from (Greece) Xanthi) |

Out: Note: Flags indicate national team as defined under FIFA eligibility rules; some limited exceptions apply. Players may hold more than one non-FIFA nationality.

| No. | Pos. | Nation | Player |
|---|---|---|---|
| 10 | FW | NOR | Steffen Lie Skålevik (on loan to (Norway) Start) |
| 10 | FW | NOR | Jørgen Strand Larsen (to (Netherlands) Groningen) |
| 20 | MF | CRC | Wílmer Azofeifa (to (Costa Rica) San Carlos) |
| 26 | MF | MLI | Ismaila Coulibaly (to (England) Sheffield United) |
| 31 | GK | NOR | Aslak Falch (to (Norway) Sandnes Ulf) |

=== Stabæk ===
In: Note: Flags indicate national team as defined under FIFA eligibility rules; some limited exceptions apply. Players may hold more than one non-FIFA nationality.

| No. | Pos. | Nation | Player |
|---|---|---|---|
| 2 | DF | NOR | Jørgen Olsen Øveraas (from (Norway) Ranheim) |
| 4 | DF | NOR | Gustav Valsvik (on loan from (Norway) Rosenborg) |
| 9 | FW | NED | Darren Maatsen (from (Netherlands) RKC Waalwijk) |
| 10 | FW | SWE | Marcus Antonsson (on loan from (Sweden) Malmö) |
| 11 | MF | NOR | Kornelius Normann Hansen (from (England) Southampton U23) |
| 14 | MF | NOR | Kristian Bernt Torgersen (promoted from junior squad) |
| 15 | DF | NOR | Sturla Ottesen (from (Norway) Kjelsås) |
| 20 | FW | NOR | Erik Botheim (on loan from (Norway) Rosenborg) |
| 21 | MF | NOR | Magnus Strandman Lundal (promoted from junior squad) |
| 22 | MF | DEN | Sammy Skytte (from (Norway) Bodø/Glimt) |
| 24 | MF | NOR | Kaloyan Kostadinov (from (Norway) Sandnes Ulf) |
| 88 | FW | NOR | Christopher Cheng (loan return from (Norway) Notodden) |

Out: Note: Flags indicate national team as defined under FIFA eligibility rules; some limited exceptions apply. Players may hold more than one non-FIFA nationality.

| No. | Pos. | Nation | Player |
|---|---|---|---|
| 7 | MF | NOR | Jesper Isaksen (on loan to (Norway) Jerv) |
| 10 | MF | USA | Romain Gall (loan return to (Sweden) Malmö) |
| 11 | FW | ZIM | Matthew Rusike (released) |
| 13 | FW | NOR | Younes Amer (demoted to junior squad) |
| 17 | MF | TPE | Will Donkin (to (Malta) Balzan) |
| 20 | MF | NOR | Ola Brynhildsen (to (Norway) Molde) |
| 72 | MF | SLO | Filip Valenčič (to (Finland) Inter Turku) |
| 77 | FW | NOR | Fitim Azemi (on loan to (Norway) Tromsø) |
| 88 | FW | NOR | Christopher Cheng (on loan to (Norway) Notodden) |

=== Start ===
In: Note: Flags indicate national team as defined under FIFA eligibility rules; some limited exceptions apply. Players may hold more than one non-FIFA nationality.

| No. | Pos. | Nation | Player |
|---|---|---|---|
| 3 | DF | NOR | Vegard Bergan (from (Norway) Bodø/Glimt) |
| 4 | MF | NED | Mohamed El Makrini (from (Scotland) Kilmarnock) |
| 10 | FW | NOR | Steffen Lie Skålevik (on loan from (Norway) Sarpsborg 08) |
| 30 | FW | CRC | Christian Bolaños (from (Costa Rica) Saprissa) |

Out: Note: Flags indicate national team as defined under FIFA eligibility rules; some limited exceptions apply. Players may hold more than one non-FIFA nationality.

| No. | Pos. | Nation | Player |
|---|---|---|---|
| 4 | MF | NGR | Afeez Aremu (to (Germany) FC St. Pauli) |
| 5 | DF | NOR | Adnan Hadzic (on loan to (Norway) Sandnes Ulf, move then made permanent) |
| 17 | FW | NGR | Adeleke Akinyemi (on loan to (Norway) HamKam) |
| 18 | MF | GHA | Isaac Twum (to (Norway) Mjøndalen) |
| 31 | DF | JAM | Damion Lowe (to (United States) Phoenix Rising) |
| 43 | DF | NOR | Altin Ujkani (on loan to (Norway) Fløy) |
| 68 | DF | NOR | Johannes Eftevaag (on loan to (Norway) Fløy) |

=== Strømsgodset ===
In: Note: Flags indicate national team as defined under FIFA eligibility rules; some limited exceptions apply. Players may hold more than one non-FIFA nationality.

| No. | Pos. | Nation | Player |
|---|---|---|---|
| 23 | DF | ISL | Valdimar Þór Ingimundarson (from (Iceland) Fylkir) |
| 30 | DF | NOR | Fabian Holst-Larsen (promoted from junior squad) |
| 42 | MF | NGR | Ipalibo Jack (from (Spain) Villarreal C, previously on loan) |
| 50 | GK | NOR | Daniel Skretteberg (promoted from junior squad) |
| 51 | MF | NOR | Aleksander Biermann Stenseth (promoted from junior squad) |
| 80 | DF | NOR | Andreas Nyhagen (loan return from (Norway) Moss) |

Out: Note: Flags indicate national team as defined under FIFA eligibility rules; some limited exceptions apply. Players may hold more than one non-FIFA nationality.

| No. | Pos. | Nation | Player |
|---|---|---|---|
| 23 | MF | LAT | Janis Ikaunieks (to (Latvia) Rigas FS) |
| 56 | FW | NOR | Mustapha Fofana (on loan to (Norway) Øygarden) |
| 57 | DF | NOR | Fredrik Carson Pedersen (to (Norway) Grorud) |
| 63 | MF | NOR | Magnus Lankhof Dahlby (on loan to (Norway) Grorud) |
| — | FW | NOR | Sebastian Pedersen (on loan to (Norway) Notodden, then transfer to (Norway) HamKam) |

=== Viking ===
In: Note: Flags indicate national team as defined under FIFA eligibility rules; some limited exceptions apply. Players may hold more than one non-FIFA nationality.

| No. | Pos. | Nation | Player |
|---|---|---|---|
| 13 | GK | WAL | Michael Crowe (from (England) Preston North End) |
| 19 | MF | NOR | Sondre Auklend (promoted from junior squad) |
| 25 | DF | NOR | Sebastian Sørlie Henriksen (promoted from junior squad) |
| 27 | FW | ISL | Samúel Kári Friðjónsson (from (Germany) SC Paderborn 07) |
| 34 | DF | NOR | Kristoffer Forgaard Paulsen (promoted from junior squad) |
| 35 | DF | NOR | Henrik Heggheim (promoted from junior squad) |
| 41 | GK | NOR | Trym Sølvberg Ur (promoted from junior squad) |

Out: Note: Flags indicate national team as defined under FIFA eligibility rules; some limited exceptions apply. Players may hold more than one non-FIFA nationality.

| No. | Pos. | Nation | Player |
|---|---|---|---|
| 2 | DF | NOR | Herman Haugen (on loan to (Norway) Ull/Kisa) |
| 12 | GK | NOR | Erik Arnebrott (retired) |
| 21 | DF | NOR | Harald Nilsen Tangen (on loan to (Norway) Åsane) |
| 25 | DF | NOR | Sebastian Sørlie Henriksen (on loan to (Norway) Fram Larvik) |
| 30 | DF | NOR | Adrian Pereira (to (Greece) PAOK) |

=== Vålerenga ===
In: Note: Flags indicate national team as defined under FIFA eligibility rules; some limited exceptions apply. Players may hold more than one non-FIFA nationality.

| No. | Pos. | Nation | Player |
|---|---|---|---|
| 7 | MF | NOR | Henrik Bjørdal (from (Belgium) Zulte Waregem) |
| 18 | MF | NOR | Fredrik Holmé (promoted from junior squad) |
| 20 | FW | NOR | Benjamin Stokke (from (Denmark) Randers) |
| 24 | FW | ISL | Viðar Örn Kjartansson (from (Russia) Rostov) |

Out: Note: Flags indicate national team as defined under FIFA eligibility rules; some limited exceptions apply. Players may hold more than one non-FIFA nationality.

| No. | Pos. | Nation | Player |
|---|---|---|---|
| 7 | FW | CRC | Deyver Vega (to (Norway) Sandefjord) |
| 16 | MF | SWE | Erik Israelsson (to (Sweden) Kalmar) |
| 18 | DF | NOR | Fredrik Holmé (on loan to (Norway) Ull/Kisa) |
| 19 | FW | NGR | Peter Godly Michael (on loan to (Norway) Øygarden, later sold to (Norway) Sogndal) |
| 21 | GK | GHA | Adam Larsen Kwarasey (released) |
| 33 | DF | NOR | Amin Nouri (on loan to (Norway) HamKam) |
| — | MF | NOR | Brede Sandmoen (on loan to (Norway) Strømmen) |

== 1. divisjon ==
=== Grorud ===
In: Note: Flags indicate national team as defined under FIFA eligibility rules; some limited exceptions apply. Players may hold more than one non-FIFA nationality.

| No. | Pos. | Nation | Player |
|---|---|---|---|
| 8 | MF | NOR | Jonas Pereira (from (Norway) Fram Larvik) |
| 18 | FW | NOR | Abdul-Basit Agouda (on loan from (Norway) KFUM Oslo) |
| 25 | FW | NOR | Sigurd Grønli (on loan from (Norway) Tromsø) |
| 30 | MF | NOR | Runar Hauge (on loan from (Norway) Bodø/Glimt) |
| 30 | MF | NOR | Sindre Osestad (from (Norway) Fram Larvik) |
| 48 | DF | NOR | Fredrik Carson Pedersen (from (Norway) Strømsgodset) |
| 99 | MF | NOR | Magnus Lankhof Dahlby (on loan from (Norway) Strømsgodset) |

Out: Note: Flags indicate national team as defined under FIFA eligibility rules; some limited exceptions apply. Players may hold more than one non-FIFA nationality.

| No. | Pos. | Nation | Player |
|---|---|---|---|
| 8 | MF | NOR | Elias Kristoffersen Hagen (to (Norway) Bodø/Glimt) |
| 18 | FW | NOR | Abdul-Basit Agouda (loan return to (Norway) KFUM Oslo) |
| 20 | DF | NOR | Saadiq Elmi (on loan to (Norway) Moss) |
| 25 | FW | NOR | Sigurd Grønli (loan return to (Norway) Tromsø) |
| 30 | MF | NOR | Runar Hauge (loan return to (Norway) Bodø/Glimt) |
| — | MF | NOR | Remi Jensen Telle (on loan to (Norway) Moss) |

=== HamKam ===
In: Note: Flags indicate national team as defined under FIFA eligibility rules; some limited exceptions apply. Players may hold more than one non-FIFA nationality.

| No. | Pos. | Nation | Player |
|---|---|---|---|
| 3 | FW | NOR | William Moan Mikalsen (from (Norway) Bodø/Glimt) |
| 6 | DF | NOR | Amin Nouri (on loan from (Norway) Vålerenga) |
| 11 | FW | NOR | Marcus Pedersen (free transfer) |
| 14 | MF | NOR | Kristian Eriksen (from (Norway) Elverum) |
| 18 | FW | NOR | Sebastian Pedersen (from (Norway) Strømsgodset) |
| 21 | MF | NOR | Tobias Svendsen (from (Norway) Molde) |
| 21 | DF | NOR | Jesper Taaje (from (Norway) Kjelsås) |
| 31 | GK | SEN | Serigne Mor Mbaye (on loan from (Norway) Kristiansund) |
| 40 | MF | NGR | Moses Ebiye (from (Norway) Lillestrøm) |
| 99 | FW | NGR | Adeleke Akinyemi (on loan from (Norway) Start) |

Out: Note: Flags indicate national team as defined under FIFA eligibility rules; some limited exceptions apply. Players may hold more than one non-FIFA nationality.

| No. | Pos. | Nation | Player |
|---|---|---|---|
| 2 | DF | NOR | Patrick Alfei Sæbø (on loan to (Norway) Kvik Halden) |
| 6 | MF | NOR | Lars Gunnar Johnsen (to (Norway) Tromsø) |
| 14 | DF | NOR | Steffen Skogvang Pedersen (to (Norway) Tromsø) |
| 21 | MF | NOR | Tobias Svendsen (to (Norway) Lillestrøm) |
| 33 | GK | NOR | Mathias Eriksen Ranmark (loan return to (Norway) Molde) |

=== Jerv ===
In: Note: Flags indicate national team as defined under FIFA eligibility rules; some limited exceptions apply. Players may hold more than one non-FIFA nationality.

| No. | Pos. | Nation | Player |
|---|---|---|---|
| 10 | MF | NED | Thomas Kok (from (Netherlands) Dordrecht) |
| 14 | DF | DEN | Daniel Arrocha (from Øygarden) |
| 15 | DF | NGR | Akeem Latifu (from Mjøndalen) |
| 22 | MF | NOR | Jesper Isaksen (on loan from Stabæk) |
| 28 | DF | NOR | Jørgen Myhre (from Start 2) |
| 32 | MF | NOR | Thomas Liene Ness (from (United States) UCF Knights) |
| 39 | FW | ARG | Juan Pablo Pereira Sastre (from (Gibraltar) Lincoln Red Imps) |
| 99 | FW | SGP | Ikhsan Fandi (from Raufoss) |

Out: Note: Flags indicate national team as defined under FIFA eligibility rules; some limited exceptions apply. Players may hold more than one non-FIFA nationality.

| No. | Pos. | Nation | Player |
|---|---|---|---|
| 10 | FW | NOR | Alexander Dang (on loan to Egersund) |

=== KFUM ===
In: Note: Flags indicate national team as defined under FIFA eligibility rules; some limited exceptions apply. Players may hold more than one non-FIFA nationality.

| No. | Pos. | Nation | Player |
|---|---|---|---|
| 2 | DF | NOR | Keivan Ghaedamini (from Skeid) |
| 9 | MF | NOR | Bilal Njie (from Odd) |
| 22 | MF | NOR | Olav Øby (from Kristiansund) |
| 24 | MF | NOR | Christoffer Lindquist (free transfer) |
| 27 | MF | NOR | Moa Mahnin (from Skeid) |
| 30 | FW | NOR | Lasse Sigurdsen (from Fløy) |

Out: Note: Flags indicate national team as defined under FIFA eligibility rules; some limited exceptions apply. Players may hold more than one non-FIFA nationality.

| No. | Pos. | Nation | Player |
|---|---|---|---|
| 1 | GK | CAN | Simon Thomas (to Sarpsborg 08) |
| 9 | FW | NOR | Abdul-Basit Agouda (on loan to Grorud, then to Øygarden) |
| 27 | MF | NOR | Simen Vedvik (retired) |

=== Kongsvinger ===
In: Note: Flags indicate national team as defined under FIFA eligibility rules; some limited exceptions apply. Players may hold more than one non-FIFA nationality.

| No. | Pos. | Nation | Player |
|---|---|---|---|
| 8 | FW | NOR | Martin Hoel Andersen (from Øygarden) |
| 15 | MF | NOR | Mahmoud Sami Al Laham (from Strømmen) |
| 16 | DF | NOR | Per Magnus Steiring (from Sogndal) |
| 19 | DF | NOR | Herman Solberg Nilsen (on loan from Sandefjord) |
| 27 | GK | COD | Riffi Mandanda (from (France) Rennes) |
| 50 | MF | NOR | Jesper Grundt (promoted from junior squad) |
| 66 | MF | NOR | Sebastian Fjose Berg (from Oppsal) |
| 92 | MF | ALB | Kamer Qaka (from (Romania) CSU Cluj) |

Out: Note: Flags indicate national team as defined under FIFA eligibility rules; some limited exceptions apply. Players may hold more than one non-FIFA nationality.

| No. | Pos. | Nation | Player |
|---|---|---|---|
| 8 | MF | KOR | Gang Dongwan (released) |
| 15 | MF | BRA | Marlinho (to (Turkey) Boluspor) |
| 30 | GK | COM | Ali Ahamada (to Brann) |
| 37 | DF | NOR | Matias Aadnøy (on loan to Eidsvold Turn) |
| 46 | MF | NOR | Sander Røed (to Notodden) |

=== Lillestrøm ===
In: Note: Flags indicate national team as defined under FIFA eligibility rules; some limited exceptions apply. Players may hold more than one non-FIFA nationality.

| No. | Pos. | Nation | Player |
|---|---|---|---|
| 4 | DF | NOR | Espen Garnås (from Ull/Kisa) |
| 7 | MF | NOR | Torbjørn Kallevåg (from Haugesund) |
| 9 | FW | ISL | Tryggvi Hrafn Haraldsson (from (Iceland) ÍA Akranes) |
| 11 | FW | NOR | Sindre Mauritz-Hansen (free transfer) |
| 11 | MF | NOR | Tobias Svendsen (from HamKam) |
| 16 | FW | ISL | Björn Bergmann Sigurðarson (from (Russia) Rostov) |
| 18 | MF | NOR | Ulrik Mathisen (from Kjelsås) |
| 20 | FW | NOR | Jonatan Braut Brunes (on loan from Florø) |
| 23 | DF | NOR | Marius Amundsen (free transfer) |
| 25 | GK | BEL | Jo Coppens (from (Germany) Carl Zeiss Jena) |

Out: Note: Flags indicate national team as defined under FIFA eligibility rules; some limited exceptions apply. Players may hold more than one non-FIFA nationality.

| No. | Pos. | Nation | Player |
|---|---|---|---|
| 1 | GK | EST | Matvei Igonen (to (Estonia) Flora) |
| 4 | DF | DEN | Tobias Salquist (to (Denmark) Hobro) |
| 11 | FW | NOR | Sindre Mauritz-Hansen (to Asker) |
| 15 | DF | NOR | Josef Baccay (on loan to Fredrikstad) |
| 17 | FW | NOR | Kristoffer Ødemarksbakken (on loan to Ull/Kisa) |
| 19 | DF | NOR | Sheriff Sinyan (to Molde) |
| 40 | MF | NGR | Moses Ebiye (to HamKam) |

=== Ranheim ===
In: Note: Flags indicate national team as defined under FIFA eligibility rules; some limited exceptions apply. Players may hold more than one non-FIFA nationality.

| No. | Pos. | Nation | Player |
|---|---|---|---|
| 2 | DF | NOR | Christian Eggen Rismark (from Brann) |
| 19 | MF | NOR | Ruben Alte (promoted from junior squad) |

Out: Note: Flags indicate national team as defined under FIFA eligibility rules; some limited exceptions apply. Players may hold more than one non-FIFA nationality.

| No. | Pos. | Nation | Player |
|---|---|---|---|
| 2 | DF | NOR | Jørgen Olsen Øveraas (to Stabæk) |
| 24 | FW | NOR | Magnus Høiseth (on loan to Nardo) |

=== Raufoss ===
In: Note: Flags indicate national team as defined under FIFA eligibility rules; some limited exceptions apply. Players may hold more than one non-FIFA nationality.

| No. | Pos. | Nation | Player |
|---|---|---|---|
| 19 | DF | NOR | Tobias Sagstuen Andersen (promoted from junior squad) |
| 24 | MF | NOR | Filip Brattbakk (on loan from Rosenborg) |
| 28 | FW | SEN | Mame Mor Ndiaye (from Fram Larvik) |
| 32 | FW | NOR | Håkon Bjørdal Leine (from Brattvåg) |
| — | FW | NOR | Jakob Ørsahl (on loan from Molde) |

Out: Note: Flags indicate national team as defined under FIFA eligibility rules; some limited exceptions apply. Players may hold more than one non-FIFA nationality.

| No. | Pos. | Nation | Player |
|---|---|---|---|
| 18 | FW | SGP | Ikhsan Fandi (to Jerv) |

=== Sandnes Ulf ===
In: Note: Flags indicate national team as defined under FIFA eligibility rules; some limited exceptions apply. Players may hold more than one non-FIFA nationality.

| No. | Pos. | Nation | Player |
|---|---|---|---|
| 7 | MF | NOR | Mads Berg Sande (on loan from Haugesund) |
| 8 | MF | NOR | Magnus Grødem (from (Denmark) Vejle) |
| 11 | MF | NOR | Horenus Tadesse (on loan from Kristiansund) |
| 11 | FW | SWE | Alexander Johansson (on loan from (Sweden) Varberg) |
| 14 | DF | NOR | Adnan Hadzic (from Start, previously on loan) |
| 15 | FW | NOR | Matteo Vallotto (loan return from Levanger) |
| 18 | MF | NOR | Chris Sleveland (from Egersund) |
| 31 | GK | NOR | Aslak Falch (from Sarpsborg 08) |
| 40 | GK | NOR | Sander Lønning (promoted from junior squad) |

Out: Note: Flags indicate national team as defined under FIFA eligibility rules; some limited exceptions apply. Players may hold more than one non-FIFA nationality.

| No. | Pos. | Nation | Player |
|---|---|---|---|
| 4 | DF | NOR | Kevin Jablinski (on loan to Øygarden) |
| 7 | MF | ESP | Simón Colina (to Kvik Halden) |
| 10 | DF | DEN | Sanel Kapidžić (released) |
| 11 | MF | NOR | Horenus Tadesse (loan return to Kristiansund) |
| 15 | FW | NOR | Matteo Vallotto (on loan to Levanger) |
| 19 | MF | NOR | Kaloyan Kostadinov (to Stabæk) |

=== Sogndal ===
In: Note: Flags indicate national team as defined under FIFA eligibility rules; some limited exceptions apply. Players may hold more than one non-FIFA nationality.

| No. | Pos. | Nation | Player |
|---|---|---|---|
| 3 | DF | NOR | Andreas van der Spa (from Øygarden) |
| 4 | DF | NOR | Martin Ove Roseth (from Molde) |
| 9 | FW | NOR | Endre Kupen (from Bodø/Glimt) |
| 14 | FW | NGR | Peter Godly Michael (from Vålerenga) |
| 17 | MF | NOR | Mathias Blårud (from Strømmen) |
| 30 | DF | NGR | Igoh Ogbu (from Rosenborg, previously on loan) |
| 32 | FW | NOR | Filip Mardal (promoted from junior squad) |
| 34 | MF | NOR | Johan Bakke (promoted from junior squad) |
| 50 | GK | NOR | Jørgen Johnsen (on loan from Vålerenga 2) |

Out: Note: Flags indicate national team as defined under FIFA eligibility rules; some limited exceptions apply. Players may hold more than one non-FIFA nationality.

| No. | Pos. | Nation | Player |
|---|---|---|---|
| 3 | DF | NOR | Per Magnus Steiring (to Kongsvinger) |
| 4 | DF | SRB | Stefan Antonijevic (to Øygarden) |
| 19 | DF | NOR | Tobias Bjørnebye (on loan to Hødd) |
| 26 | DF | NOR | Jonas Tillung Fredriksen (to Åsane) |
| 28 | MF | NOR | Mathias Sundberg (on loan to Tromsdalen) |

=== Stjørdals-Blink ===
In: Note: Flags indicate national team as defined under FIFA eligibility rules; some limited exceptions apply. Players may hold more than one non-FIFA nationality.

| No. | Pos. | Nation | Player |
|---|---|---|---|
| 16 | FW | NOR | Franklin Daddys Boy Nyenetue (from Rosenborg) |
| 18 | DF | NOR | Håvard Kleven Lorentsen (on loan from Levanger) |
| 24 | | NOR | Iver Nordmeland Westerlund (from Rosenborg 2) |
| 25 | FW | NOR | Lasse Bransdal (free transfer) |
| 26 | MF | NOR | Adan Abadala Hussein (on loan from Bodø/Glimt) |
| 27 | MF | NOR | Ask Tjærandsen-Skau (on loan from Bodø/Glimt) |

Out: Note: Flags indicate national team as defined under FIFA eligibility rules; some limited exceptions apply. Players may hold more than one non-FIFA nationality.

| No. | Pos. | Nation | Player |
|---|---|---|---|
| 16 | MF | NOR | Arne Holter (on loan to Nardo) |

=== Strømmen ===
In: Note: Flags indicate national team as defined under FIFA eligibility rules; some limited exceptions apply. Players may hold more than one non-FIFA nationality.

| No. | Pos. | Nation | Player |
|---|---|---|---|
| 16 | MF | NOR | Brede Sandmoen (on loan from Vålerenga) |
| 22 | DF | NOR | Martin Sjølstad (from Follo) |
| 24 | MF | NOR | Brage Naustdal (from Florø) |
| 25 | MF | NOR | Tobias Myhre (from Lørenskog) |

Out: Note: Flags indicate national team as defined under FIFA eligibility rules; some limited exceptions apply. Players may hold more than one non-FIFA nationality.

| No. | Pos. | Nation | Player |
|---|---|---|---|
| 7 | MF | NOR | Mahmoud Al Laham (to Kongsvinger) |
| 8 | MF | NOR | Mathias Blårud (to Sogndal) |

=== Tromsø ===
In: Note: Flags indicate national team as defined under FIFA eligibility rules; some limited exceptions apply. Players may hold more than one non-FIFA nationality.

| No. | Pos. | Nation | Player |
|---|---|---|---|
| 3 | DF | NOR | Jesper Bergset Robertsen (promoted from junior squad) |
| 6 | MF | NOR | Lars Gunnar Johnsen (from HamKam) |
| 7 | FW | NOR | Fitim Azemi (on loan from Stabæk) |
| 9 | FW | NOR | Runar Espejord (on loan from (Netherlands) Heerenveen) |
| 16 | FW | NOR | Sigurd Grønli (loan return from Grorud) |
| 19 | FW | NOR | Mohammed Ahamed Jama (from Krokelvdalen) |
| 23 | MF | NOR | Runar Norheim (from Varden) |
| 26 | DF | NOR | Steffen Skogvang Pedersen (from HamKam) |
| 29 | DF | NOR | Erlend Sivertsen (on loan from Kristiansund) |

Out: Note: Flags indicate national team as defined under FIFA eligibility rules; some limited exceptions apply. Players may hold more than one non-FIFA nationality.

| No. | Pos. | Nation | Player |
|---|---|---|---|
| 6 | DF | FIN | Juha Pirinen (to (Slovakia) AS Trencin) |
| 16 | FW | NOR | Sigurd Grønli (on loan to Grorud) |
| 20 | FW | NOR | Brage Berg Pedersen (on loan to Alta, then to Øygarden) |
| 23 | FW | NOR | Isak Hansen-Aarøen (to (England) Manchester United U23) |
| 32 | DF | NOR | Runar Johansen (on loan to Fløya) |
| 34 | MF | NOR | Tomas Stabell (on loan to Fløya) |

=== Ull/Kisa ===
In: Note: Flags indicate national team as defined under FIFA eligibility rules; some limited exceptions apply. Players may hold more than one non-FIFA nationality.

| No. | Pos. | Nation | Player |
|---|---|---|---|
| 6 | MF | NOR | Erik Ansok Frøysa (on loan from Bærum) |
| 24 | MF | NOR | Elias Sebastian Solberg (promoted from junior squad) |
| 26 | DF | NOR | Fredrik Holmé (on loan from Vålerenga) |
| 27 | FW | NOR | Mesut Can (from Skeid) |
| 28 | DF | NOR | Stian Ringstad (free transfer) |
| 29 | DF | NOR | Herman Haugen (on loan from Viking) |
| 32 | FW | NOR | Kristoffer Ødemarksbakken (on loan from Lillestrøm) |

Out: Note: Flags indicate national team as defined under FIFA eligibility rules; some limited exceptions apply. Players may hold more than one non-FIFA nationality.

| No. | Pos. | Nation | Player |
|---|---|---|---|
| 6 | DF | NOR | Espen Garnås (to Lillestrøm) |
| 7 | MF | NOR | Erik Rosland (to Kjelsås) |
| 10 | MF | NOR | Martin Wilhelmsen Trøen (retired) |
| 17 | MF | NOR | Martin Søreide (on loan to Kvik Halden) |
| 27 | FW | NOR | Mesut Can (to (Turkey) Amedspor) |

=== Øygarden ===
In: Note: Flags indicate national team as defined under FIFA eligibility rules; some limited exceptions apply. Players may hold more than one non-FIFA nationality.

| No. | Pos. | Nation | Player |
|---|---|---|---|
| 6 | MF | NOR | Andreas Fantoft (from Sotra) |
| 9 | DF | NOR | Kevin Jablinski (on loan from Sandnes Ulf) |
| 10 | FW | NOR | Kristoffer Stava (on loan from Åsane) |
| 15 | DF | SRB | Stefan Antonijevic (from Sogndal) |
| 17 | FW | NGR | Peter Godly Michael (on loan from Vålerenga) |
| 17 | DF | NOR | Kristoffer Bidne (on loan from Åsane) |
| 18 | FW | NOR | Brage Berg Pedersen (on loan from Tromsø) |
| 19 | FW | NOR | Aune Heggebø (on loan from Brann) |
| 22 | DF | NOR | Knut Spangelo Haga (on loan from Sotra) |
| 23 | FW | NOR | Nii Noye Samuel Narh (on loan from Sotra) |
| 27 | FW | NOR | Abdul-Basit Agouda (on loan from KFUM Oslo) |
| 28 | FW | NOR | Mustapha Fofana (on loan from Strømsgodset) |
| 29 | DF | NOR | Vegard Strønen Skeie (on loan from Brann) |

Out: Note: Flags indicate national team as defined under FIFA eligibility rules; some limited exceptions apply. Players may hold more than one non-FIFA nationality.

| No. | Pos. | Nation | Player |
|---|---|---|---|
| 3 | DF | DEN | Daniel Arrocha (to Jerv) |
| 6 | MF | ESP | Nando Cózar (to (Finland) PEPO) |
| 9 | FW | NOR | Martin Hoel Andersen (to Kongsvinger) |
| 10 | MF | NOR | Mathias Dahl Abelsen (to Alta) |
| 17 | FW | NGR | Peter Godly Michael (loan return to Vålerenga) |
| 22 | DF | NOR | Fabian Filip Rimestad (on loan to Sotra) |
| 23 | FW | NOR | Even Hepsø Vetås (on loan to Sotra) |
| 27 | DF | NOR | Andreas van der Spa (to Sogndal) |

=== Åsane ===
In: Note: Flags indicate national team as defined under FIFA eligibility rules; some limited exceptions apply. Players may hold more than one non-FIFA nationality.

| No. | Pos. | Nation | Player |
|---|---|---|---|
| 12 | DF | NOR | David Møller Wolfe (on loan from Brann) |
| 14 | DF | NOR | Jonas Tillung Fredriksen (from Sogndal) |
| 18 | DF | NOR | Ole Kallevåg (loan return from Sotra) |
| 24 | DF | NOR | Sigurd Kvile (from Sarpsborg 08 2) |
| 29 | DF | NOR | Harald Nilsen Tangen (on loan from Viking) |
| 91 | MF | NOR | Kristoffer Larsen (free transfer) |
| 96 | GK | DEN | Mark Jensen (from Florø) |

Out: Note: Flags indicate national team as defined under FIFA eligibility rules; some limited exceptions apply. Players may hold more than one non-FIFA nationality.

| No. | Pos. | Nation | Player |
|---|---|---|---|
| 7 | FW | NOR | Kristoffer Stava (on loan to Øygarden) |
| 17 | DF | NOR | Ole Didrik Blomberg (to Brann) |
| 18 | FW | NOR | Ole Kallevåg (on loan to Sotra) |
| 25 | DF | NOR | Kristoffer Bidne (on loan to Øygarden) |
| 30 | DF | NOR | Elias Rognstad Brox (on loan to Sotra) |
