= 2020 Stabæk Fotball season =

Stabæk
2020 season
- Chairman: Espen Moe
- Manager: Jan Jönsson
- Stadium: Nadderud Stadion
- Eliteserien: 8th
- Norwegian Cup: Canceled due to the COVID-19 pandemic
- Top goalscorer: League: Oliver Edvardsen (6); All: Oliver Edvardsen (6)
| Home colours | Away colours |

The 2020 season was Stabæk's 24th season in the top flight of Norwegian football.

== Season events ==
On 12 June, the Norwegian Football Federation announced that a maximum of 200 home fans would be allowed to attend the upcoming seasons matches.

On 10 September, the Norwegian Football Federation cancelled the 2020 Norwegian Cup due to the COVID-19 pandemic in Norway.

On 30 September, the Minister of Culture and Gender Equality, Abid Raja, announced that clubs would be able to have crowds of 600 at games from 12 October.

== Squad ==
As of match played 22 December 2020

| No. | Name | Nationality | Position | Date of birth (age) | Signed from | Signed in | Contract ends | Apps. | Goals |
Goalkeepers
| 1 | Marius Amundsen Ulla | (Norway) | GK | 10 June 2002 (age 24) | HamKam | 2018 | | 0 | 0 |
| 12 | Marcus Sandberg | (Sweden) | GK | 7 November 1990 (age 35) | Vålerenga | 2018 | | 77 | 0 |
| 84 | Jonas Vatne Brauti | (Norway) | GK | 14 May 1999 (age 27) | Ullern | 2019 | | 0 | 0 |
Defenders
| 2 | Jørgen Olsen Øveraas | (Norway) | DF | 3 December 1989 (age 36) | Ranheim | 2020 | | 19 | 1 |
| 3 | Yaw Ihle Amankwah | (Norway) | DF | 7 July 1988 (age 38) | Hobro | 2019 | | 35 | 1 |
| 4 | Gustav Valsvik | (Norway) | DF | 26 May 1993 (age 33) | loan from Rosenborg | 2020 | 2020 | 10 | 1 |
| 5 | Mats Solheim | (Norway) | DF | 3 December 1987 (age 38) | Hammarby | 2020 | | 29 | 3 |
| 15 | Sturla Ottesen | (Norway) | DF | 25 May 2001 (age 25) | Kjelsas | 2020 | | 9 | 0 |
| 18 | Jeppe Moe | (Norway) | DF | 3 August 1995 (age 31) | Youth Team | 2016 | | 106 | 1 |
| 26 | Emil Jonassen | (Norway) | DF | 17 February 1993 (age 33) | BATE Borisov | 2020 | | 20 | 0 |
| 27 | Nicolas Jenssen | (Norway) | DF | 22 January 2002 (age 24) | Youth team | 2020 | | 7 | 0 |
| 30 | Peder Vogt | (Norway) | DF | 6 April 2000 (age 26) | Youth Team | 2019 | | 17 | 0 |
Midfielders
| 6 | Luc Kassi | (Ivory Coast) | MF | 20 August 1994 (age 32) | | 2012 | | 197 | 43 |
| 7 | Jesper Isaksen | (Norway) | MF | 13 October 1999 (age 26) | Kristiansund | 2020 | | 10 | 0 |
| 8 | Emil Bohinen | (Norway) | MF | 12 March 1999 (age 27) | Youth Team | 2017 | | 73 | 9 |
| 10 | Marcus Antonsson | (Sweden) | MF | 8 May 1991 (age 35) | loan from Malmö | 2020 | 2020 | 10 | 1 |
| 13 | Younes Amer | (Norway) | MF | 13 March 2001 (age 25) | Nordstrand | 2019 | | 0 | 0 |
| 14 | Kristian Torgersen | (Norway) | MF | 16 May 2003 (age 23) | Academy | 2020 | | 1 | 0 |
| 21 | Magnus Lundal | (Norway) | MF | 6 April 2000 (age 26) | Youth Team | 2019 | | 15 | 1 |
| 22 | Sammy Skytte | (Denmark) | MF | 20 February 1997 (age 29) | Bodø/Glimt | 2020 | 2023 | 27 | 1 |
| 24 | Kaloyan Kostadinov | (Norway) | MF | 18 July 2002 (age 24) | Sandnes Ulf | 2020 | | 12 | 0 |
| 67 | Tortol Lumanza | (Belgium) | MF | 13 April 1994 (age 32) | Osmanlıspor | 2019 | | 66 | 3 |
| 88 | Christopher Cheng | (Norway) | MF | 27 October 2001 (age 24) | Youth Team | 2020 | | 0 | 0 |
Forwards
| 9 | Darren Maatsen | (Netherlands) | FW | 30 January 1991 (age 35) | RKC Waalwijk | 2020 | | 18 | 3 |
| 11 | Kornelius Hansen | (Norway) | FW | 6 May 2001 (age 25) | Southampton | 2020 | | 27 | 5 |
| 19 | Kosuke Kinoshita | (Japan) | FW | 3 October 1994 (age 31) | Sint-Truidense | 2019 | | 31 | 5 |
| 20 | Erik Botheim | (Norway) | FW | 10 January 2000 (age 26) | loan from Rosenborg | 2020 | 2020 | 15 | 0 |
| 23 | Oliver Edvardsen | (Norway) | FW | 19 March 1999 (age 27) | Grorud | 2019 | | 37 | 8 |
Out on loan
| 77 | Fitim Azemi | (Norway) | FW | 25 June 1992 (age 34) | Vålerenga | 2020 | | 0 | 0 |
Left During the Season
| 10 | Romain Gall | (United States) | MF | 31 January 1995 (age 31) | loan from Malmö | 2020 | | 10 | 0 |
| 16 | Andreas Hanche-Olsen | (Norway) | DF | 17 January 1997 (age 29) | Youth Team | 2016 | | 127 | 7 |
| 17 | Will Donkin | (Chinese Taipei) | MF | 26 December 2000 (age 25) | Crystal Palace | 2020 | | 0 | 0 |
| 20 | Ola Brynhildsen | (Norway) | MF | 13 March 1999 (age 27) | Youth Team | 2017 | | 65 | 11 |
| 25 | Hugo Vetlesen | (Norway) | MF | 29 February 2000 (age 26) | Youth Team | 2017 | | 105 | 6 |
| 72 | Filip Valenčič | (Slovenia) | MF | 7 January 1992 (age 34) | HJK | 2018 | | 12 | 0 |

== Transfers ==
=== Winter ===
In: Note: Flags indicate national team as defined under FIFA eligibility rules; some limited exceptions apply. Players may hold more than one non-FIFA nationality.

| No. | Pos. | Nation | Player |
|---|---|---|---|
| 5 | DF | NOR | Mats Solheim (from (Sweden) Hammarby) |
| 7 | MF | NOR | Jesper Isaksen (from (Norway) Kristiansund) |
| 10 | MF | USA | Romain Gall (on loan from (Sweden) Malmö) |
| 17 | MF | TPE | Will Donkin (from (England) Crystal Palace U-23s) |
| 26 | DF | NOR | Emil Jonassen (free agent) |
| 77 | FW | NOR | Fitim Azemi (from (Norway) Vålerenga) |

Out: Note: Flags indicate national team as defined under FIFA eligibility rules; some limited exceptions apply. Players may hold more than one non-FIFA nationality.

| No. | Pos. | Nation | Player |
|---|---|---|---|
| 1 | GK | NOR | Simen Lillevik Kjellevold (to (Norway) Strømmen) |
| 2 | DF | VEN | Ronald Hernández (to (Scotland) Aberdeen) |
| 4 | DF | NOR | Vadim Demidov (retired) |
| 5 | DF | NOR | Steinar Strømnes (to (Norway) Hamarkameratene) |
| 7 | MF | GHA | Raymond Gyasi (to (Finland) RoPS) |
| 9 | FW | NOR | Sindre Mauritz-Hansen (released) |
| 14 | MF | NOR | Kristoffer Askildsen (to (Italy) Sampdoria) |
| 15 | DF | NOR | Morten Renå Olsen (to (Norway) Strømmen, previously on loan at (Norway) Notodden) |
| 17 | FW | NOR | Daniel Braaten (released) |
| 29 | FW | NOR | Oscar Aga (to (Norway) Grorud, previously on loan) |
| 88 | MF | NOR | Herman Geelmuyden (to (Netherlands) Jong PSV) |

=== Summer ===
In: Note: Flags indicate national team as defined under FIFA eligibility rules; some limited exceptions apply. Players may hold more than one non-FIFA nationality.

| No. | Pos. | Nation | Player |
|---|---|---|---|
| 2 | DF | NOR | Jørgen Olsen Øveraas (from (Norway) Ranheim) |
| 4 | DF | NOR | Gustav Valsvik (loan from (Norway) Rosenborg) |
| 9 | FW | NED | Darren Maatsen (from (Netherlands) RKC Waalwijk) |
| 10 | MF | SWE | Marcus Antonsson (loan from (Sweden) Malmö) |
| 11 | MF | NOR | Kornelius Normann Hansen (from (England) Southampton U23) |
| 15 | DF | NOR | Sturla Ottesen (from (Norway) Kjelsas) |
| 20 | FW | NOR | Erik Botheim (loan from (Norway) Rosenborg) |
| 22 | MF | DEN | Sammy Skytte (from (Norway) Bodø/Glimt) |
| 24 | MF | NOR | Kaloyan Kostadinov (from (Norway) Sandnes Ulf) |

Out: Note: Flags indicate national team as defined under FIFA eligibility rules; some limited exceptions apply. Players may hold more than one non-FIFA nationality.

| No. | Pos. | Nation | Player |
|---|---|---|---|
| 10 | MF | USA | Romain Gall (loan return to (Sweden) Malmö) |
| 11 | FW | ZIM | Matthew Rusike (released) |
| 16 | DF | NOR | Andreas Hanche-Olsen (to (Belgium) Gent) |
| 17 | MF | TPE | Will Donkin (to (Malta) Balzan) |
| 20 | MF | NOR | Ola Brynhildsen (to (Norway) Molde) |
| 25 | MF | NOR | Hugo Vetlesen (to (Norway) Bodø/Glimt) |
| 72 | MF | SLO | Filip Valenčič (to (Finland) Inter Turku) |
| 77 | FW | NOR | Fitim Azemi (on loan to (Norway) Tromsø) |

== Competitions ==
=== Eliteserien ===
==== Results summary ====
| Overall | | | | | | | | Home | | | | | | Away | | | | | |
| Pld | W | D | L | GF | GA | GD | Pts | W | D | L | GF | GA | GD | W | D | L | GF | GA | GD |
|---|---|---|---|---|---|---|---|---|---|---|---|---|---|---|---|---|---|---|---|
| 30 | 9 | 12 | 9 | 41 | 45 | −4 | 39 | 5 | 6 | 4 | 19 | 17 | +2 | 4 | 6 | 5 | 22 | 28 | −6 |

Last updated: 22 December 2020.
Source: see below

==== Results by match ====
| Match | 1 | 2 | 3 | 4 | 5 | 6 | 7 | 8 | 9 | 10 | 11 | 12 | 13 | 14 | 15 | 16 | 17 | 18 | 19 | 20 | 21 | 22 | 23 | 24 | 25 | 26 | 27 | 28 | 29 | 30 |
|---|---|---|---|---|---|---|---|---|---|---|---|---|---|---|---|---|---|---|---|---|---|---|---|---|---|---|---|---|---|---|
| Ground | H | A | H | A | H | H | A | H | A | A | H | A | H | A | H | A | H | A | H | A | H | A | H | A | H | A | H | A | H | A |
| Result | D | D | W | L | W | L | W | D | W | D | D | L | L | D | L | D | W | L | W | L | W | D | D | D | L | W | D | L | D | W |
| Position | 8 | 10 | 6 | 9 | 6 | 9 | 6 | 7 | 5 | 5 | 5 | 7 | 8 | 7 | 8 | 9 | 7 | 9 | 8 | 9 | 8 | 8 | 8 | 8 | 9 | 8 | 8 | 9 | 8 | 8 |

Updated to match(es) played on 22 December 2020. Source: see below
A = Away; H = Home; W = Win; D = Draw; L = Loss

==== Results ====
| 16 June 2020 1 | Stabæk | 0–0 | Mjøndalen | Bærum |
| 18:00 CEST (UTC+2) | Vetlesen (yellow card) 57' | Report | Aasmundsen (yellow card) 19'; Johansen (yellow card) 62'; Hansen (yellow card) 83' (yellow-red card) 90+2' | Stadium: Nadderud Stadion; Attendance: 200; Referee: Tore Hansen |
Note: Match played in-front of maximum capacity of 200 fans due to the COVID-19 pandemic in Norway.

| 21 June 2020 2 | Vålerenga | 2–2 | Stabæk | Oslo |
| 18:00 CEST (UTC+2) | Shala 16' (yellow card) 28' (yellow-red card) 55'; Lekven (yellow card) 32'; Myhre (yellow card) 68'; Dønnum (yellow card) 69'; Vilhjálmsson 72' (pen.) | Report | Kassi 38'; Edvardsen 40'; Hanche-Olsen (yellow card) 43'; Solheim (yellow card) 77'; Bohinen (yellow card) 81' | Stadium: Intility Arena; Attendance: 200; Referee: Rohit Saggi |
Note: Match played in-front of maximum capacity of 200 fans due to the COVID-19 pandemic in Norway.

| 24 June 2020 3 | Stabæk | 2–0 | Sandefjord | Bærum |
| 18:00 CEST (UTC+2) | Hanche-Olsen 30'; Hansen (yellow card) 36'; Vetlesen 82' | Report | Brenden (yellow card) 24'; Pálsson (yellow card) 48' (yellow-red card) 59'; Rufo (yellow card) 56' | Stadium: Nadderud Stadion; Attendance: 200; Referee: Tommy Skjerven |

| 28 June 2020 4 | Molde | 4–1 | Stabæk | Molde |
| 18:00 CEST (UTC+2) | Eikrem 20' (yellow card) 42'; Aursnes (yellow card) 40'; Knudtzon 55'; James 59'; Kitolano (yellow card) 70'; Ellingsen (yellow card) 75'; Hussain (yellow card) 90+2'; Omoijuanfo 90+4' (pen.) | Report | Vetlesen 61' (yellow card) 70'; Hanche-Olsen (yellow card) 90+1'; Edvardsen (yellow card) 90+4' | Stadium: Aker Stadion; Attendance: 200; Referee: Rohit Saggi |

| 1 July 2020 5 | Stabæk | 2–0 | Strømsgodset | Bærum |
| 18:00 CEST (UTC+2) | Hansen 33', 41' | Report | Mølvadgaard (yellow card) 84' | Stadium: Nadderud Stadion; Attendance: 200; Referee: Ola Hobber Nilsen |

| 5 July 2020 6 | Stabæk | 0–3 | Rosenborg | Bærum |
| 20:30 CEST (UTC+2) | | Report | Trondsen (yellow card) 19'; Åsen (yellow card) 24'; Valsvik 59'; Islamović 66'; Zachariassen 73' | Stadium: Nadderud Stadion; Attendance: 200; Referee: Svein Oddvar Moen |

| 12 July 2020 7 | Kristiansund | 1–2 | Stabæk | Kristiansund |
| 18:00 CEST (UTC+2) | Sørmo 11'; Sivertsen (yellow card) 71' | Report | Bohinen 14' (pen.) (yellow card) 52'; Hansen 88' | Stadium: Kristiansund Stadion; Attendance: 200; Referee: Mohammad Usman Aslam |

| 16 July 2020 8 | Stabæk | 1–1 | Sarpsborg 08 | Bærum |
| 18:00 CEST (UTC+2) | Hanche-Olsen (yellow card) 39'; Vetlesen 43'; Kinoshita (yellow card) 90+2' | Report | Soltvedt 47'; Lindseth (yellow card) 64' | Stadium: Nadderud Stadion; Attendance: 200; Referee: Tore Hansen |

| 19 July 2020 9 | Aalesund | 1–3 | Stabæk | Ålesund |
| 18:00 CEST (UTC+2) | Sæthre (yellow card) 19'; Sno (yellow card) 26'; Nordli 42' | Report | Kinoshita 7'; Edvardsen 61'; Hanche-Olsen 87' (pen.); Botheim (yellow card) 90' | Stadium: Color Line Stadion; Attendance: 200; Referee: Rohit Saggi |

| 26 July 2020 10 | Start | 0–0 | Stabæk | Kristiansand |
| 18:00 CEST (UTC+2) | Kabran (yellow card) 40'; Markovic (yellow card) 62'; Twum (yellow card) 84' | Report | | Stadium: Sør Arena; Attendance: 200; Referee: Tom Harald Hagen |

| 30 July 2020 11 | Stabæk | 2–2 | Bodø/Glimt | Bærum |
| 18:00 CEST (UTC+2) | Solheim 23'; Hanche-Olsen (yellow card) 45'; Edvardsen (yellow card) 54'; Hansen 61' | Report | Saltnes 12'; Junker 18'; Zinckernagel (yellow card) 42'; Fet (yellow card) 53'; Lode (yellow card) 66' | Stadium: Nadderud Stadion; Attendance: 200; Referee: Sigurd Smehus Kringstad |

| 2 August 2020 12 | Haugesund | 3–1 | Stabæk | Haugesund |
| 18:00 CEST (UTC+2) | Velde 39', 45+1', 90+4' (pen.); Pedersen (yellow card) 49'; Desler (yellow card) 79'; Stølås (yellow card) 84' | Report | Lumanza (yellow card) 20'; Bohinen 78' (pen.) | Stadium: Haugesund Stadion; Attendance: 200; Referee: Kai Erik Steen |

| 9 August 2020 13 | Stabæk | 0–1 | Odd | Bærum |
| 18:00 CEST (UTC+2) | | Report | Kaasa (yellow card) 52'; Bakenga 69'; Rossbach (yellow card) 90+3' | Stadium: Nadderud Stadion; Attendance: 200; Referee: Rohit Saggi |

| 16 August 2020 14 | Viking | 3–3 | Stabæk | Stavanger |
| 18:00 CEST (UTC+2) | Berisha 42', 58' (pen.); Løkberg (yellow card) 49'; Bytyqi 53' | Report | Lundal 22'; Bohinen 29' (pen.); Vetlesen (yellow card) 49'; Solheim (yellow card) 58'; Kinoshita 81' | Stadium: Viking Stadion; Attendance: 200; Referee: Marius Hansen Grøtta |

| 24 August 2020 15 | Stabæk | 0–2 | Brann | Bærum |
| 20:30 CEST (UTC+2) | Botheim (yellow card) 68'; Bohinen (yellow card) 83' | Report | Taylor 62'; Barmen (yellow card) 74'; Bamba 90+4' | Stadium: Nadderud Stadion; Attendance: 200; Referee: Tore Hansen |

| 30 August 2020 16 | Rosenborg | 2–2 | Stabæk | Trondheim |
| 18:00 CEST (UTC+2) | Tagseth 12'; Børven 56' (pen.); Hedenstad (yellow card) 90+3' | Report | Vetlesen 48'; Jonassen (yellow card) 79'; Edvardsen 84' | Stadium: Lerkendal Stadion; Attendance: 200; Referee: Tommy Skjerven |

| 12 September 2020 17 | Stabæk | 2–1 | Haugesund | Bærum |
| 20:30 CEST (UTC+2) | Hanche-Olsen 12'; Skytte (yellow card) 17'; Solheim (yellow card) 30'; Maatsen 76' | Report | Hanche-Olsen 33' (o.g.); Sandberg (yellow card) 58'; Pedersen (yellow card) 82' | Stadium: Nadderud Stadion; Attendance: 200; Referee: Mohammad Usman Aslam |

| 20 September 2020 18 | Odd | 2–0 | Stabæk | Skien |
| 20:30 CEST (UTC+2) | Rashani 27'; Ruud 77' | Report | | Stadium: Skagerak Arena; Attendance: 200; Referee: Tom Harald Hagen |

| 27 September 2020 19 | Stabæk | 2–0 | Start | Bærum |
| 18:00 CEST (UTC+2) | Hanche-Olsen (yellow card) 22'; Maatsen (yellow card) 50'; Kassi 69'; Solheim 81' | Report | E.Wichne (yellow card) 31' | Stadium: Nadderud Stadion; Attendance: 200; Referee: Sivert Amland |

| 3 October 2020 20 | Sarpsborg 08 | 4–0 | Stabæk | Sarpsborg |
| 18:00 CEST (UTC+2) | Dyrestam 12'; Heintz 17'; Lindseth 23'; Utvik 26' | Report | Amankwah (yellow card) 53'; Vogt (yellow card) 63'; Kostadinov (yellow card) 87' | Stadium: Sarpsborg Stadion; Attendance: 200; Referee: Marius Hansen Grøtta |

| 18 October 2020 21 | Stabæk | 4–0 | Aalesund | Bærum |
| 18:00 CEST (UTC+2) | Bohinen 39'; Edvardsen 52'; Solheim 58'; Valsvik 81' | Report | Castro (yellow card) 25'; A.Lie (yellow card) 29'; Karamoko (yellow card) 34'; Bizoza (yellow card) 54' | Stadium: Nadderud Stadion; Attendance: 387; Referee: Dag Vidar Hafsås |

| 24 October 2020 22 | Brann | 1–1 | Stabæk | Bergen |
| 20:30 CEST (UTC+2) | Haugen (yellow card) 43'; Barmen 75' (yellow card) 84' | Report | Edvardsen 51'; Bohinen (yellow card) 59' | Stadium: Brann Stadion; Attendance: 600; Referee: Sigurd Smehus Kringstad |

| 1 November 2020 23 | Stabæk | 1–1 | Viking | Bærum |
| 18:00 CET (UTC+1) | Kassi 31' | Report | Bjørshol (yellow card) 14'; Løkberg (yellow card) 20'; Bytyqi 41'; Bell (yellow card) 47'; Vevatne (yellow card) 81' | Stadium: Nadderud Stadion; Attendance: 600; Referee: Rohit Saggi |

| 8 November 2020 24 | Sandefjord | 0–0 | Stabæk | Sandefjord |
| 18:00 CET (UTC+1) | Mørk (yellow card) 90+1' | Report | Solheim (yellow card) 38'; Jonassen (yellow card) 55' | Stadium: Sandefjord Arena; Attendance: 600; Referee: Marius Hansen Grøtta |

| 21 November 2020 25 | Stabæk | 0–3 | Molde | Bærum |
| 16:00 CET (UTC+1) | | Report | James 45+1', 85'; Aursnes (yellow card) 60'; Gregersen 81' | Stadium: Nadderud Stadion; Attendance: 200; Referee: Tom Harald Hagen |

| 29 November 2020 26 | Mjøndalen | 0–1 | Stabæk | Mjøndalen |
| 18:00 CET (UTC+1) | | Report | Bohinen 1'; Amankwah (yellow card) 45'; Jenssen (yellow card) 79'; Sandberg (yellow card) 82' | Stadium: Consto Arena; Attendance: 200; Referee: Sigurd Smehus Kringstad |

| 2 December 2020 27 | Stabæk | 1–1 | Vålerenga | Bærum |
| 20:00 CET (UTC+1) | Antonsson 65' | Report | Kjartansson 9' | Stadium: Nadderud Stadion; Attendance: 200; Referee: Dag Vidar Hafsås |

| 6 December 2020 28 | Bodø/Glimt | 5–2 | Stabæk | Bodø |
| 17:00 CET (UTC+1) | Zinckernagel 3', 51'; Junker 12' (pen.); Saltnes 19'; Fet 68' | Report | Ottesen (yellow card) 44'; Jenssen (yellow card) 61'; Kinoshita 90+3', 90+4' | Stadium: Aspmyra Stadion; Attendance: 600; Referee: Sivert Amland |

| 13 December 2020 29 | Stabæk | 2–2 | Kristiansund | Bærum |
| 18:00 CET (UTC+1) | Edvardsen 55'; Øveraas 65'; Bohinen (yellow card) 75'; Antonsson (yellow card) 78'; Valsvik (yellow card) 87' | Report | Sørli (yellow card) 33'; Sørmo (yellow card) 68'; Moumbagna 80'; Psyché 84' | Stadium: Nadderud Stadion; Attendance: 200; Referee: Rohit Saggi |

| 22 December 2020 30 | Strømsgodset | 0–4 | Stabæk | Drammen |
| 18:00 CET (UTC+1) | Salvesen (penalty missed) 67'; Gulliksen (yellow card) 77' | Report | Hansen 44'; Kostadinov (yellow card) 49'; Maatsen 79', 85'; Kinoshita 90+3' | Stadium: Marienlyst Stadion; Attendance: 200; Referee: Kai Erik Steen |

==== Table ====
| Pos | Team | Pld | W | D | L | GF | GA | GD | Pts |
|---|---|---|---|---|---|---|---|---|---|
| 6 | Viking | 30 | 12 | 8 | 10 | 54 | 52 | +2 | 44 |
| 7 | Odd | 30 | 13 | 4 | 13 | 52 | 51 | +1 | 43 |
| 8 | Stabæk | 30 | 9 | 12 | 9 | 41 | 45 | −4 | 39 |
| 9 | Haugesund | 30 | 11 | 6 | 13 | 39 | 51 | −12 | 39 |
| 10 | Brann | 30 | 9 | 9 | 12 | 40 | 49 | −9 | 36 |

Source: Football Association of Norway (in Norwegian)
Rules for classification: 1) Points; 2) Goal difference; 3) Goals scored; 4) Head-to-head points; 5) Head-to-head goal difference; 6) Head-to-head away goals scored (only if between two teams); 7) Head-to-head goals scored; 8) Play-off (only used to decide champions or relegation).

=== Norwegian Cup ===
| 2020 First round | – |
| CEST (UTC+2) |
Note: Cup cancelled on 10 September due to the COVID-19 pandemic in Norway.

== Squad statistics ==
As of match played 22 December 2020

=== Appearances and goals ===
| No. | Pos | Nat | Player | Total | | Eliteserien | | Norwegian Cup | |
| No. | Pos | Nat | Player | Apps | Goals | Apps | Goals | Apps | Goals |
|---|---|---|---|---|---|---|---|---|---|
| 2 | DF | (Norway) NOR | Jørgen Øveraas | 19 | 1 | 14+5 | 1 | 0 | 0 |
| 3 | DF | (Norway) NOR | Yaw Ihle Amankwah | 20 | 0 | 17+3 | 0 | 0 | 0 |
| 4 | DF | (Norway) NOR | Gustav Valsvik | 10 | 1 | 10 | 1 | 0 | 0 |
| 5 | DF | (Norway) NOR | Mats Solheim | 29 | 3 | 29 | 3 | 0 | 0 |
| 6 | MF | (Ivory Coast) CIV | Luc Kassi | 15 | 3 | 8+7 | 3 | 0 | 0 |
| 7 | MF | (Norway) NOR | Jesper Isaksen | 9 | 0 | 0+9 | 0 | 0 | 0 |
| 8 | MF | (Norway) NOR | Emil Bohinen | 25 | 5 | 25 | 5 | 0 | 0 |
| 9 | FW | (Netherlands) NED | Darren Maatsen | 18 | 3 | 9+9 | 3 | 0 | 0 |
| 10 | MF | (Sweden) SWE | Marcus Antonsson | 10 | 1 | 10 | 1 | 0 | 0 |
| 11 | FW | (Norway) NOR | Kornelius Hansen | 27 | 5 | 15+12 | 5 | 0 | 0 |
| 12 | GK | (Sweden) SWE | Marcus Sandberg | 30 | 0 | 30 | 0 | 0 | 0 |
| 14 | MF | (Norway) NOR | Kristian Torgersen | 1 | 0 | 0+1 | 0 | 0 | 0 |
| 15 | DF | (Norway) NOR | Sturla Ottesen | 9 | 0 | 9 | 0 | 0 | 0 |
| 19 | FW | (Japan) JPN | Kosuke Kinoshita | 22 | 5 | 7+15 | 5 | 0 | 0 |
| 20 | FW | (Norway) NOR | Erik Botheim | 15 | 0 | 8+7 | 0 | 0 | 0 |
| 21 | MF | (Norway) NOR | Magnus Lundal | 14 | 1 | 5+9 | 1 | 0 | 0 |
| 22 | MF | (Denmark) DEN | Sammy Skytte | 14 | 0 | 14 | 0 | 0 | 0 |
| 23 | FW | (Norway) NOR | Oliver Edvardsen | 30 | 6 | 28+2 | 6 | 0 | 0 |
| 24 | MF | (Norway) NOR | Kaloyan Kostadinov | 12 | 0 | 11+1 | 0 | 0 | 0 |
| 26 | DF | (Norway) NOR | Emil Jonassen | 20 | 0 | 13+7 | 0 | 0 | 0 |
| 27 | DF | (Norway) NOR | Nicolas Jenssen | 7 | 0 | 3+4 | 0 | 0 | 0 |
| 30 | DF | (Norway) NOR | Peder Vogt | 12 | 0 | 7+5 | 0 | 0 | 0 |
| 67 | MF | (Belgium) BEL | Tortol Lumanza | 23 | 0 | 19+4 | 0 | 0 | 0 |
Players away from Stabæk on loan:
Players who appeared for Stabæk no longer at the club:
| 10 | MF | (United States) USA | Romain Gall | 10 | 0 | 4+6 | 0 | 0 | 0 |
| 16 | DF | (Norway) NOR | Andreas Hanche-Olsen | 18 | 3 | 18 | 3 | 0 | 0 |
| 25 | MF | (Norway) NOR | Hugo Vetlesen | 19 | 4 | 18+1 | 4 | 0 | 0 |
| 72 | MF | (Slovenia) SLO | Filip Valenčič | 6 | 0 | 0+6 | 0 | 0 | 0 |

=== Goalscorers ===
| Rank | Pos. | No. | Nat. | Player | Eliteserien | Norwegian Cup | Total |
|---|---|---|---|---|---|---|---|
| 1 | FW | 23 | (Norway) | Oliver Edvardsen | 6 | 0 | 6 |
| 2 | MF | 8 | (Norway) | Emil Bohinen | 5 | 0 | 5 |
| 2 | FW | 11 | (Norway) | Kornelius Hansen | 5 | 0 | 5 |
| 2 | FW | 19 | (Japan) | Kosuke Kinoshita | 5 | 0 | 5 |
| 5 | MF | 25 | (Norway) | Hugo Vetlesen | 4 | 0 | 4 |
| 6 | DF | 23 | (Norway) | Andreas Hanche-Olsen | 3 | 0 | 3 |
| 6 | DF | 5 | (Norway) | Mats Solheim | 3 | 0 | 3 |
| 6 | MF | 6 | (Ivory Coast) | Luc Kassi | 3 | 0 | 3 |
| 6 | FW | 9 | (Netherlands) | Darren Maatsen | 3 | 0 | 3 |
| 10 | MF | 21 | (Norway) | Magnus Lundal | 1 | 0 | 1 |
| 10 | DF | 4 | (Norway) | Gustav Valsvik | 1 | 0 | 1 |
| 10 | MF | 10 | (Sweden) | Marcus Antonsson | 1 | 0 | 1 |
| 10 | DF | 2 | (Norway) | Jørgen Øveraas | 1 | 0 | 1 |
| TOTALS | | | | | 41 | 0 | 41 |

=== Clean sheets ===
| Rank | Pos. | No. | Nat. | Player | Eliteserien | Norwegian Cup | Total |
|---|---|---|---|---|---|---|---|
| 1 | GK | 12 | (Sweden) | Marcus Sandberg | 9 | 0 | 9 |
| TOTALS | | | | | 9 | 0 | 9 |

=== Disciplinary record ===
| No. | Pos. | Nat. | Name | Eliteserien | | Norwegian Cup | | Total | |
| No. | Pos. | Nat. | Name | Booked | Sent off (straight red) | Booked | Sent off (straight red) | Booked | Sent off (straight red) |
| 3 | DF | (Norway) | Yaw Ihle Amankwah | 2 | 0 | 0 | 0 | 2 | 0 |
| 4 | DF | (Norway) | Gustav Valsvik | 1 | 0 | 0 | 0 | 1 | 0 |
| 5 | DF | (Norway) | Mats Solheim | 4 | 0 | 0 | 0 | 4 | 0 |
| 8 | MF | (Norway) | Emil Bohinen | 5 | 0 | 0 | 0 | 5 | 0 |
| 9 | FW | (Netherlands) | Darren Maatsen | 1 | 0 | 0 | 0 | 1 | 0 |
| 10 | FW | (Sweden) | Marcus Antonsson | 1 | 0 | 0 | 0 | 1 | 0 |
| 11 | FW | (Norway) | Kornelius Hansen | 1 | 0 | 0 | 0 | 1 | 0 |
| 12 | GK | (Sweden) | Marcus Sandberg | 1 | 0 | 0 | 0 | 1 | 0 |
| 15 | DF | (Norway) | Sturla Ottesen | 1 | 0 | 0 | 0 | 1 | 0 |
| 19 | FW | (Japan) | Kosuke Kinoshita | 1 | 0 | 0 | 0 | 1 | 0 |
| 20 | FW | (Norway) | Erik Botheim | 2 | 0 | 0 | 0 | 2 | 0 |
| 22 | MF | (Denmark) | Sammy Skytte | 1 | 0 | 0 | 0 | 1 | 0 |
| 23 | FW | (Norway) | Oliver Edvardsen | 2 | 0 | 0 | 0 | 2 | 0 |
| 24 | MF | (Norway) | Kaloyan Kostadinov | 2 | 0 | 0 | 0 | 2 | 0 |
| 26 | DF | (Norway) | Emil Jonassen | 2 | 0 | 0 | 0 | 2 | 0 |
| 27 | DF | (Norway) | Nicolas Jenssen | 2 | 0 | 0 | 0 | 2 | 0 |
| 30 | DF | (Norway) | Peder Vogt | 1 | 0 | 0 | 0 | 1 | 0 |
| 67 | MF | (Belgium) | Tortol Lumanza | 1 | 0 | 0 | 0 | 1 | 0 |
Players who appeared for Stabæk no longer at the club:
| 16 | DF | (Norway) | Andreas Hanche-Olsen | 5 | 0 | 0 | 0 | 5 | 0 |
| 25 | MF | (Norway) | Hugo Vetlesen | 3 | 0 | 0 | 0 | 3 | 0 |
| TOTALS | | | | 39 | 0 | 0 | 0 | 39 | 0 |
