= 2021 Stabæk Fotball season =

Stabæk
2021 season
- Chairman: Espen Moe
- Head coach: Jan Jönsson (until 4 July); Eirik Kjønø (from 9 July)
- Stadium: Nadderud Stadion
- Eliteserien: 15th (relegated)
- Norwegian Cup: Third round
- Top goalscorer: League: Oliver Edvardsen (7); All: Oliver Edvardsen (7)
Home colours	Away colours

The 2021 season is Stabæk Fotball's 98th season in existence and the club's 8th consecutive season in the top flight of Norwegian football. In addition to the domestic league, Stabæk Fotball participating in this season's edition of the Norwegian Football Cup.

== Players ==
=== First team squad ===
As of 27 October 2021

Note: Flags indicate national team as defined under FIFA eligibility rules; some limited exceptions apply. Players may hold more than one non-FIFA nationality.

No.	Pos.	Nation	Player
1	GK	NOR	Marius Amundsen Ulla
2	DF	DEN	Kasper Pedersen
3	DF	NOR	Yaw Ihle Amankwah (captain)
4	DF	NOR	Simen Wangberg
5	DF	SVK	Ivan Mesík (on loan from Nordsjælland)
6	MF	CIV	Luc Kassi
7	FW	CIV	Mathis Bolly (on loan from Molde)
8	MF	NOR	Fredrik Haugen
9	FW	NOR	Pål Alexander Kirkevold
10	MF	NOR	Markus Solbakken
11	FW	NOR	Kornelius Normann Hansen
12	GK	SWE	Marcus Sandberg
14	MF	NOR	Bernt Torgersen
15	DF	NOR	Sturla Ottesen

No.	Pos.	Nation	Player
16	MF	NOR	Martin Høyland
18	DF	NOR	Jeppe Moe
19	DF	SWE	Victor Wernersson (on loan from Mechelen)
20	MF	NOR	Aleksander Andresen
22	MF	DEN	Sammy Skytte
23	FW	NOR	Oliver Valaker Edvardsen
24	MF	NOR	Kaloyan Kostadinov
26	MF	POR	Tomás Podstawski
27	DF	NOR	Nicolas Pignatel Jenssen
29	DF	NOR	Kristoffer Lassen Harrison
33	GK	NOR	Viktor Gustavsen Engh
67	MF	BEL	Tortol Lumanza
77	FW	NOR	Fitim Azemi
80	MF	NOR	Herman Geelmuyden

=== Out on loan ===
Note: Flags indicate national team as defined under FIFA eligibility rules; some limited exceptions apply. Players may hold more than one non-FIFA nationality.

No. / Pos. / Nation / Player; 30 / DF / NOR / Peder Vogt (on loan at Asker until 31 December 2021)	No. / Pos. / Nation / Player; 88 / FW / NOR / Christopher Cheng (on loan at Strømmen until 31 December 2021)

== Transfers ==
=== Winter ===
In: Note: Flags indicate national team as defined under FIFA eligibility rules; some limited exceptions apply. Players may hold more than one non-FIFA nationality.

No.	Pos.	Nation	Player
4	DF	NOR	Simen Wangberg (from Tromsø)
7	MF	NOR	Jesper Isaksen (loan return from Jerv)
8	MF	KOS	Herolind Shala (from Vålerenga)
9	FW	UKR	Oleksiy Khoblenko (on loan from (Ukraine) Dnipro-1)
10	MF	NOR	Markus Solbakken (from Hamkam)
25	FW	NGR	Uche Great Sabastine (on loan from (Nigeria) Kano Pillars)
32	FW	NOR	Antonio Nusa (promoted from junior squad)
77	FW	NOR	Fitim Azemi (loan return from Tromsø)
80	MF	NOR	Herman Geelmuyden (from (Netherlands) Jong PSV)

Out: Note: Flags indicate national team as defined under FIFA eligibility rules; some limited exceptions apply. Players may hold more than one non-FIFA nationality.

No.	Pos.	Nation	Player
2	DF	NOR	Jørgen Olsen Øveraas (to Sandnes Ulf)
4	DF	NOR	Gustav Valsvik (loan return to Rosenborg)
8	MF	NOR	Emil Bohinen (to (Russia) CSKA Moscow)
9	FW	NED	Darren Maatsen (to (Netherlands) NAC)
10	FW	SWE	Marcus Antonsson (loan return to (Sweden) Malmö)
20	FW	NOR	Erik Botheim (loan return to Rosenborg)
88	FW	NOR	Christopher Cheng (on loan to Strømmen)

=== Summer ===
In: Note: Flags indicate national team as defined under FIFA eligibility rules; some limited exceptions apply. Players may hold more than one non-FIFA nationality.

No.	Pos.	Nation	Player
2	DF	DEN	Kasper Pedersen (from (Denmark) Esbjerg)
5	DF	SVK	Ivan Mesík (on loan from (Denmark) Nordsjælland)
7	FW	CIV	Mathis Bolly (on loan from Molde)
8	MF	NOR	Fredrik Haugen (from (Cyprus) AEK Larnaca)
9	FW	NOR	Pål Alexander Kirkevold (from (Denmark) Hobro)
16	MF	NOR	Martin Høyland (from Grorud)
19	DF	SWE	Victor Wernersson (on loan from (Belgium) Mechelen)
20	FW	NOR	Aleksander Andresen (promoted to senior squad, previously on loan at Moss)
26	MF	POR	Tomás Podstawski (from (Poland) Pogoń Szczecin)
29	FW	NOR	Kristoffer Lassen Harrison (promoted from junior squad)
31	DF	NOR	Olav Lilleøren Veum (promoted from junior squad)

Out: Note: Flags indicate national team as defined under FIFA eligibility rules; some limited exceptions apply. Players may hold more than one non-FIFA nationality.

No.	Pos.	Nation	Player
5	DF	NOR	Mats Solheim (retired)
7	MF	NOR	Jesper Isaksen (to Kristiansund, previously on loan at Fredrikstad)
8	MF	KOS	Herolind Shala (to (Turkey) BB Erzurumspor)
9	FW	UKR	Oleksiy Khoblenko (loan return to (Ukraine) Dnipro-1)
14	MF	NOR	Kristian Bernt Torgersen (demoted to junior team)
19	FW	JPN	Kosuke Kinoshita (to (Japan) Urawa Red Diamonds)
21	MF	NOR	Magnus Strandman Lundal (retired)
25	FW	NGR	Uche Great Sabastine (loan return to (Nigeria) Kano Pillars)
26	DF	NOR	Emil Jonassen (to Odd)
30	MF	NOR	Peder Vogt (on loan to Asker)
32	FW	NOR	Antonio Nusa (to (Belgium) Club Brugge)
84	GK	NOR	Jonas Vatne Brauti (to KFUM)

== Competitions ==
=== Eliteserien ===
==== Results summary ====
Overall								Home						Away					
Pld	W	D	L	GF	GA	GD	Pts	W	D	L	GF	GA	GD	W	D	L	GF	GA	GD
30	6	7	17	35	62	−27	25	4	3	8	17	27	−10	2	4	9	18	35	−17

Last updated: 12 December 2021.

==== Results by round ====
Round	1	2	3	4	5	6	7	8	9	10	11	12	13	14	15	16	17	18	19	20	21	22	23	24	25	26	27	28	29	30
Ground	H	A	H	A	H	A	H	A	H	A	H	A	A	H	A	H	A	H	H	A	H	A	H	A	H	A	H	A	H	A
Result	L	W	D	D	W	L	L	L	L	D	L	L	L	W	L	D	L	L	D	W	L	D	L	L	W	L	W	D	L	L
Position	12	9	9	12	8	9	10	12	14	13	13	15	15	15	15	15	15	16	16	15	15	15	15	16	14	15	14	14	14	15

A = Away; H = Home; W = Win; D = Draw; L = Loss

==== Results ====
19 May 2021 3	Stabæk	2–2	Odd	Bærum
20:00 CEST (UTC+2)	Hansen 9'; Skytte 47'	Report	Bakenga 19' (pen.), 44'	Stadium: Nadderud Stadion; Attendance: 0 Referee: Mohammad Usman Aslam

24 May 2021 4	Haugesund	0–0	Stabæk	Haugesund
18:00 CEST (UTC+2)		Report		Stadium: Haugesund Stadion; Attendance: 600; Referee: Kristoffer Hagenes

27 May 2021 5	Stabæk	2–0	Brann	Bærum
18:00 CEST (UTC+2)	Skytte 21' (pen.); Amankwah 64'	Report		Stadium: Nadderud Stadion; Attendance: 600; Referee: Marius Hansen Grøtta

30 May 2021 6	Rosenborg	4–2	Stabæk	Trondheim
18:00 CEST (UTC+2)	Wiedesheim-Paul 47'; Ceïde 61'; Zachariassen 74'; Šerbečić 77'	Report	Wangberg 14'; Edvardsen 90+1'	Stadium: Lerkendal Stadion; Attendance: 600; Referee: Kai Erik Steen

14 June 2021 7	Stabæk	0–3	Tromsø	Bærum
19:00 CEST (UTC+2)		Report	Ebiye 9', 14'; Totland 90'	Stadium: Nadderud stadion Attendance: 600; Referee: Sigurd Smehus Kringstad

20 June 2021 8	Molde	2–1	Stabæk	Molde
18:00 CEST (UTC+2)	Omoijuanfo 15', 20'; Risa (yellow card) 47'	Report	Kinoshita 65'	Stadium: Aker Stadion; Attendance: 2,000; Referee: Kristoffer Hagenes

24 June 2021 9	Stabæk	0–2	Vålerenga	Bærum
20:00 CEST (UTC+2)		Report	Borchgrevink 86'; Jatta 90+2'	Stadium: Nadderud Stadion; Attendance: 1,492; Referee: Tore Hansen

27 June 2021 12	Bodø/Glimt	4–1	Stabæk	Bodø
18:00 CEST (UTC+2)	Nordås 11'; Fet 14'; Saltnes 27'; Botheim 32'	Report	Nusa 81'	Stadium: Aspmyra Stadion; Attendance: 2,000; Referee: Marius Hansen Grøtta

30 June 2021 10	Viking	3–3	Stabæk	Stavanger
18:00 CEST (UTC+2)	Berisha 30' (pen.), 48' de Lanlay 83'	Report	Nusa 26', 67'; Geelmuyden 61'	Stadium: Viking Stadion; Attendance: 3,059; Referee: Marius Hansen Grøtta

4 July 2021 11	Stabæk	0–2	Sandefjord	Bærum
15:00 CEST (UTC+2)		Report	Jónsson 9'; Ruud Tveter 59'	Stadium: Nadderud Stadion; Attendance: 1,109; Referee: Mohammad Usman Aslam

18 July 2021 13	Strømsgodset	2–1	Stabæk	Drammen
20:00 CEST (UTC+2)	Hove 37'; Friday 80'	Report	Edvardsen 35'	Stadium: Marienlyst Stadion; Attendance: 2,000; Referee: Svein Oddvar Moen

21 July 2021 1	Stabæk	2–3	Lillestrøm	Bærum
19:00 CEST (UTC+2)	Edvardsen 55'; Geelmuyden 77'	Report	Mathew 9'; Lehne Olsen 66', 71'	Stadium: Nadderud Stadion; Attendance: 1,773; Referee: Tom Harald Hagen

28 July 2021 2	Mjøndalen	1–2	Stabæk	Mjøndalen
19:00 CEST (UTC+2)	Stokke 90' (pen.)	Report	Wangberg 39'; Edvardsen 77'	Stadium: Consto Arena; Attendance: 1,350; Referee: Sivert Amland

8 August 2021 14	Stabæk	3–1	Sarpsborg 08	Bærum
20:00 CEST (UTC+2)	Wangberg 8'; Edvardsen 45', 56'	Report	Opseth 81'	Stadium: Nadderud Stadion; Attendance: 1,773; Referee: Rohit Saggi

14 August 2021 15	Kristiansund	5–1	Stabæk	Kristiansund
18:00 CEST (UTC+2)	Nilsen 30'; Bye 39' (pen.); Muçolli 48'; Kartum 55'; Sivertsen 89'	Report	Høyland 28'	Stadium: Kristiansund Stadion; Attendance: 1,900; Referee: Kristoffer Hagenes

21 August 2021 16	Stabæk	1–1	Mjøndalen	Bærum
18:00 CEST (UTC+2)	Hansen 2'	Report	Olden Larsen 76'	Stadium: Nadderud Stadion; Attendance: 2,000; Referee: Tom Harald Hagen

29 August 2021 17	Vålerenga	3–1	Stabæk	Oslo
20:00 CEST (UTC+2)	Layouni 14'; Christensen 54', 59'	Report	Bolly 90+2'	Stadium: Intility Arena; Attendance: 4,579; Referee: Kai Erik Steen

11 September 2021 18	Stabæk	1–3	Viking	Bærum
18:00 CEST (UTC+2)	Azemi 15'	Report	Berisha 10', 72'; Vevatne 67'	Stadium: Nadderud Stadion; Attendance: 2,000; Referee: Tommy Skjerven

26 September 2021 20	Sandefjord	0–3	Stabæk	Sandefjord
18:00 CEST (UTC+2)		Report	Haugen 5'; Kirkevold 80'; Moe 89'	Stadium: Release Arena; Attendance: 1,411; Referee: Mohammad Usman Aslam

29 September 2021 19	Stabæk	0–0	Strømsgodset	Bærum
19:00 CEST (UTC+2)		Report		Stadium: Nadderud Stadion; Attendance: 2,306; Referee: Sivert Amland

3 October 2021 21	Stabæk	0–3	Bodø/Glimt	Bærum
18:00 CEST (UTC+2)		Report	Botheim 54'; Bjørkan 62'; Koomson 86'	Stadium: Nadderud Stadion; Attendance: 2,420; Referee: Rohit Saggi

17 October 2021 22	Brann	1–1	Stabæk	Bergen
17:00 CEST (UTC+2)	Skaanes 90+1'	Report	Mesík 38'	Stadium: Brann Stadion; Attendance: 13,524; Referee: Tommy Skjerven

23 October 2021 23	Stabæk	0–3	Molde	Bærum
18:00 CEST (UTC+2)		Report	Mesík 17' (o.g.); Omoijuanfo 49', 84'	Stadium: Nadderud Stadion; Attendance: 2,413; Referee: Kristoffer Hagenes

27 October 2021 24	Lillestrøm	3–0	Stabæk	Lillestrøm
18:00 CEST (UTC+2)	Garnås 56'; Lehne Olsen 63', 83'	Report		Stadium: Åråsen Stadion; Attendance: 3,594; Referee: Kai Erik Steen

31 October 2021 25	Stabæk	2–1	Haugesund	Bærum
18:00 CET (UTC+1)	Ottesen 76'; Bolly 84'	Report	Velde 69'	Stadium: Nadderud Stadion; Attendance: 1,953; Referee: Sigurd Smehus Kringstad

6 November 2021 26	Sarpsborg 08	4–1	Stabæk	Sarpsborg
18:00 CET (UTC+1)	Lindseth 5', 77'; Opseth 75', 86'	Report	Bolly 78'	Stadium: Sarpsborg Stadion; Attendance: 5,409; Referee: Ola Hobber Nilsen

21 November 2021 27	Stabæk	3–0	Kristiansund	Bærum
17:00 CET (UTC+1)	Solbakken 50'; Haugen 53'; Edvardsen 78'	Report		Stadium: Nadderud Stadion; Attendance: 2,353; Referee: Mohammad Usman Aslam

28 November 2021 28	Tromsø	0–0	Stabæk	Tromsø
17:00 CET (UTC+1)		Report		Stadium: Alfheim Stadion; Attendance: 1,715; Referee: Tore Hansen

5 December 2021 29	Stabæk	1–3	Rosenborg	Bærum
17:00 CET (UTC+1)	Azemi 73'	Report	Holse 57'; Islamović 60'; Konradsen 76'	Stadium: Nadderud Stadion; Attendance: 2,670; Referee: Tom Harald Hagen

12 December 2021 30	Odd	3–1	Stabæk	Skien
17:00 CET (UTC+1)	Wallem 18'; Ruud 76'; Lauritsen 84'	Report	Haugen 67'	Stadium: Skagerak Arena; Attendance: 2,691; Referee: Rohit Saggi

==== Table ====
Pos	Team	Pld	W	D	L	GF	GA	GD	Pts	Qualification or relegation
12	Tromsø	30	8	11	11	33	44	−11	35	
13	Odd	30	8	9	13	44	58	−14	33	
14	Brann (R)	30	5	11	14	38	55	−17	26	Qualification for the relegation play-offs
15	Stabæk (R)	30	6	7	17	35	62	−27	25	Relegation to First Division
16	Mjøndalen (R)	30	4	10	16	33	52	−19	22	Relegation to First Division

Source: Football Association of Norway (in Norwegian)
Rules for classification: 1) Points; 2) Goal difference; 3) Goals scored; 4) Head-to-head points; 5) Head-to-head goal difference; 6) Head-to-head away goals scored (only if between two teams); 7) Head-to-head goals scored; 8) Play-off (only used to decide champions or relegation).
(R) Relegated

=== Norwegian Football Cup ===
24 July 2021 First round	Follo	0–1	Stabæk	Follo
15:00 CEST (UTC+2)		Report	Hansen 90+5'	Stadium: Ski Stadion; Attendance: 437; Referee: Johan William Grundt

1 August 2021 Second round	Ull/Kisa	0–1	Stabæk	Jessheim
18:00 CEST (UTC+2)		Report	Hansen 37'	Stadium: Jessheim Stadion; Attendance: 650; Referee: Ali al Hatam

22 September 2021 Third round	Strømsgodset	5–1	Stabæk	Drammen
18:00 CEST (UTC+2)	Stenevik 13'; Valsvik 44'; Kadiri 65', 69', 72'	Report	Ottesen 5'	Stadium: Marienlyst Stadion; Attendance: 1,700; Referee: Kristoffer Hagenes
