= Erik Rudi =

Norwegian footballer (born 1975)

Erik Rudi (born 7 January 1975) is a retired Norwegian football midfielder.

He played friendly matches for Lillestrøm SK in 1993, and made his first-team debut in 1994, but was not officially drafted into the first-team squad before 1995. He did not break through in Lillestrøm, and after three Eliteserien games he continued his career in IL Hødd in 1996, HamKam in 1997–2000, Skeid in 2001–2003, Bærum in 2003–2005 and Strømmen in 2006.
