= John Kenneth Svendsen =

Norwegian footballer (born 1976)

Personal information
- Date of birth: 24 March 1976 (age 50)
- Position: Midfielder

Senior career*
Years	Team	Apps	(Gls)
1995−1996	Bærum		
1997−2000	Lyn	42	(3)
2001−2002	Hønefoss		
2003−2004	Bærum		
- * Club domestic league appearances and goals

John Kenneth Svendsen (born 24 March 1976) is a retired Norwegian football midfielder.

He came through the ranks of Bærum SK, where he also ended his career. The winger played for Lyn in the 1997 Norwegian Premier League and for three additional seasons, and for fellow second-tier club Hønefoss for two seasons.
