= Mustapha Fofana =

Norwegian footballer (born 2001)

Personal information
- Date of birth: 10 May 2001 (age 25)
- Place of birth: Bo, Sierra Leone
- Height: 1.85 m (6 ft 1 in)
- Position: Forward

Team information
- Current team: Vindbjart
- Number: 10

Youth career
- –2014: Skiold
- 2015: Stoppen
- 2016–2019: Strømsgodset

Senior career*
Years	Team	Apps	(Gls)
2019–2021	Strømsgodset	10	(1)
2020	→ Øygarden (loan)	5	(0)
2021	→ Bærum (loan)	3	(1)
2021	→ Ørn Horten (loan)	11	(5)
2022–2023	Ørn Horten	20	(1)
2024–	Vindbjart	47	(28)

International career^{‡}
2019	Norway U18	5	(2)
- * Club domestic league appearances and goals as of 28 June 2026 ‡ National team caps and goals as of 23 April 2025

Mustapha Fofana (born 10 May 2001) is a professional footballer who plays as a forward for Vindbjart. Born in Sierra Leone, he has represented Norway internationally.

== Playing career ==
Joining Strømsgodset's youth setup in 2016 after tenures in other local teams, he made his senior debut in the 2019 Norwegian Football Cup against Ullern. He signed for the first team in June 2019, and made his league debut in July 2019 against Lillestrøm.

In the closing stages of the 2020 1. divisjon he went on loan to Øygarden FK, having played not a single game for Strømsgodset in 2020. In 2021, a loan at third-tier Bærum SK was short-lived, and he went on to fourth-tier Ørn Horten, whom he helped win promotion to the third tier. In 2024 he continued to Vindbjart FK.
