= Nicolas Pignatel Jenssen =

Norwegian footballer (born 2002)

Personal information
- Date of birth: 12 January 2002 (age 24)
- Height: 1.82 m (6 ft 0 in)
- Position: Defender

Team information
- Current team: Egersund
- Number: 5

Youth career
- Helset
- Stabæk

Senior career*
Years	Team	Apps	(Gls)
2018–2024	Stabæk	66	(1)
2024	Start	29	(3)
2025–	Egersund	26	(0)

International career^{‡}
2017	Norway U15	6	(1)
2018	Norway U16	14	(1)
2019	Norway U17	12	(0)
2020	Norway U18	2	(0)
2021–2023	Norway U20	8	(0)
- * Club domestic league appearances and goals as of 9 November 2025 ‡ National team caps and goals as of 20 February 2024

Nicolas Pignatel Jenssen (born 12 January 2002) is a Norwegian football defender who plays for Egersund.

== Career ==
Hailing from Lommedalen, he started playing for Helset as a child. He joined Stabæk's youth system and signed for the senior team in January 2018. He made his debut in a friendly match the same month. Jenssen, also a staple in Norwegian youth national teams, made his official debut in the 2019 Norwegian Football Cup against Alta, and made his league debut in July 2020 against Strømsgodset.

On 26 January 2025, he joined Egersund on a two-year contract.

== Career statistics ==
As of 7 July 2026

Club	Season	League			National Cup		Total	
Club	Season	Division	Apps	Goals	Apps	Goals	Apps	Goals
Stabæk	2019	Eliteserien	0	0	1	0	1	0
Stabæk	2020	Eliteserien	8	0	–		8	0
Stabæk	2021	Eliteserien	27	0	2	0	29	0
Stabæk	2022	1. divisjon	24	1	3	0	27	1
Stabæk	2023	Eliteserien	7	0	3	1	10	1
Stabæk	Total		66	1	9	1	75	2
Start	2024	1. divisjon	29	3	1	0	30	3
Start	Total		29	3	0	0	30	0
Egersund	2025	1. divisjon	26	0	2	0	28	0
Egersund	2026	1. divisjon	0	0	2	0	0	0
Egersund	Total		26	0	4	0	30	0
Career total			122	4	13	1	135	5

== Honours ==
Individual

- Norwegian First Division Young Player of the Month: June 2022
