= Peder Vogt =

Norwegian footballer (born 2000)

Personal information
- Date of birth: 6 April 2000 (age 26)
- Position: Defender

Youth career
- Øvrevoll Hosle
- 2013–2019: Stabæk

Senior career*
Years	Team	Apps	(Gls)
2019–2022	Stabæk	21	(0)
2021	→ Asker (loan)	25	(0)
2022	→ Asker (loan)	4	(0)
2023	Stabæk	24	(2)
2024	Mjøndalen	20	(1)
- * Club domestic league appearances and goals as of 1 September 2024

Peder Vogt (born 11 February 2000) is a Norwegian professional footballer.

Hailing from Hosle, he went from Øvrevoll Hosle to Stabæk at the age of 13. Progressing through the youth teams, he made his senior league debut in April 2019 against Bodø/Glimt, and also featured in the first three 2019 Norwegian Football Cup rounds. When the 2020 Eliteserien commenced, he was a starter on left back, since Jeppe Moe was injured.

On 28 August 2024, Mjøndalen announced that Vogt had stopped his career due to studying.
