= Thomas Liene Ness =

Norwegian footballer (born 1998)

Personal information
- Date of birth: 5 October 1998 (age 28)
- Place of birth: Grimstad Municipality, Norway
- Height: 1.78 m (5 ft 10 in)
- Position: Midfielder

Team information
- Current team: Arendal
- Number: 23

Youth career
- –2017: Jerv

College career
Years	Team	Apps	(Gls)
2018–2020	UCF Knights		

Senior career*
Years	Team	Apps	(Gls)
2018	Vindbjart	1	(0)
2020–2023	Jerv	20	(0)
2021	→ Levanger (loan)	11	(0)
2024–	Arendal	22	(1)
- * Club domestic league appearances and goals as of 1 January 2025

Thomas Liene Ness (born 5 October 1998) is a Norwegian footballer who plays as a midfielder for Arendal.

== Career ==
Ness started his career with Jerv. Between 2018 and 2020, he played college soccer in the US for UCF Knights. On 9 April 2022, he made his Eliteserien debut for Jerv in a 4–0 loss against Lillestrøm.

On 18 December 2023, Arendal announced the signing of Liene Ness.
