= Uche Sabastine =

Nigerian footballer

Personal information
- Full name: Uche Great Sabastine
- Date of birth: 10 June 2000 (age 26)
- Place of birth: Enugu, Nigeria
- Position: Forward

Senior career*
Years	Team	Apps	(Gls)
2021–2023	Kano Pillars		
2021	→ Stabæk (loan)	5	(0)
2022	→ Östersund (loan)	7	(0)
2023–2024	Skënderbeu Korçë	12	(0)
- * Club domestic league appearances and goals as of 1 June 2024

Uche Great Sabastine (born 10 June 2000) is a Nigerian football striker.
