= Magnus Bækken =

Norwegian footballer (born 2001)

Personal information
- Full name: Magnus Magnetun Bækken
- Date of birth: 20 July 2001 (age 25)
- Position: Forward

Team information
- Current team: Asker

Youth career
- –2015: Gol
- 2016: Hallingdal

Senior career*
Years	Team	Apps	(Gls)
2016–2019	Hallingdal	53	(39)
2020–2022	Mjøndalen	6	(0)
2020	→ Notodden (loan)	9	(2)
2023	Strømmen	24	(2)
2024–	Asker		
- * Club domestic league appearances and goals as of 27 February 2024

Magnus Bækken (born 20 July 2001) is a Norwegian football striker who plays for Asker.

Hailing from Gol, he played for his local team and then the cooperation team Hallingdal. He made his debut for them in the 2016 3. divisjon and afterwards became a prolific goalscorer in the 4. divisjon. Picked up by first-tier club Mjøndalen in 2020, he did not play any games that season and was loaned out to Notodden without scoring there either. He made his Eliteserien debut in July 2021 against Odd and scored his only Mjøndalen goal in the 2021 Norwegian Football Cup against Mjøndalen. Following one year in Strømmen he signed for Asker in 2024.
