= Sturla Ottesen =

Norwegian footballer (born 2001)

Personal information
- Date of birth: 25 May 2001 (age 25)
- Place of birth: Oslo, Norway
- Height: 1.81 m (5 ft 11 in)
- Position: Right-back

Team information
- Current team: Lillestrøm
- Number: 3

Youth career
- –2016: Kjelsås
- 2017–2019: Lyn

Senior career*
Years	Team	Apps	(Gls)
2016	Kjelsås 2	1	(0)
2018	Lyn 2	6	(3)
2019–2020	Kjelsås	33	(2)
2020–2023	Stabæk	95	(5)
2023	Stabæk 2	2	(0)
2024–2025	Cambuur	47	(0)
2026–	Lillestrøm	11	(0)

International career^{‡}
2019	Norway U18	10	(0)
2021–2022	Norway U20	4	(0)
- * Club domestic league appearances and goals as of 23 July 2026 ‡ National team caps and goals as of 28 March 2022

Sturla Ottesen (born 25 May 2001) is a Norwegian professional footballer who plays as a right-back for Lillestrøm.

== Club career ==
=== Kjelsås ===
Ottesen started his youth career at Kjelsås, and after a stint at Lyn, he returned to Kjelsås where he started his senior career. The club was playing in the Norwegian Second Division when he made his debut on 14 April 2019, in a game against Asker. He was a starter in that match, which his team won 3–1. He recorded strong performances during his debut 2019 season, and was voted Talent of the Year in that league by the Football Association of Norway.

=== Stabæk ===
On 5 October 2020, Ottesen signed with Eliteserien club Stabæk. He made his professional debut on 18 October 2020, starting against Aalesund in a 4–0 win. Ottesen scored his first goal for Stabæk on 22 September 2021, in a 5–1 loss to Strømsgodset in the Norwegian Football Cup.

=== Cambuur ===
Ottesen moved abroad for the first time on 5 February 2024, signing with Dutch second-tier Eerste Divisie club Cambuur on a one-and-a-half-year deal. He made his debut for the club five days later, replacing Jhondly van der Meer in the 55th minute of a 3–3 home league draw against VVV-Venlo.

== International career ==
Ottesen is a Norwegian former youth international.

== Career statistics ==
As of match played 8 November 2024

Appearances and goals by club, season and competition
Club	Season	League			National cup		Other		Total	
Club	Season	Division	Apps	Goals	Apps	Goals	Apps	Goals	Apps	Goals
Kjelsås 2	2016	3. divisjon	1	0	—		—		1	0
Lyn 2	2018	4. divisjon	6	3	—		—		6	3
Kjelsås	2019	2. divisjon	21	2	2	0	—		23	2
Kjelsås	2020	2. divisjon	12	0	0	0	—		12	0
Kjelsås	Total		33	2	2	0	—		35	2
Stabæk	2020	Eliteserien	9	0	0	0	—		9	0
Stabæk	2021	Eliteserien	29	1	3	1	—		32	2
Stabæk	2022	Eliteserien	29	3	6	1	—		35	4
Stabæk	2023	Eliteserien	28	1	2	0	—		30	1
Stabæk	Total		95	5	11	2	—		106	7
Stabæk 2	2023	3. divisjon	2	0	—		—		2	0
Cambuur	2023–24	Eerste Divisie	15	0	1	0	—		16	0
Cambuur	2024–25	Eerste Divisie	13	0	1	2	—		14	2
Cambuur	Total		28	0	2	2	—		30	2
Career total			165	10	15	4	0	0	180	14
