= Fredrik Carson Pedersen =

Norwegian footballer (born 2002)

Fredrik Pedersen
Personal information
- Full name: Fredrik Carson Pedersen
- Date of birth: 9 October 2002 (age 24)
- Place of birth: Norway
- Height: 1.71 m (5 ft 7 in)
- Position: Right back

Team information
- Current team: Sandefjord
- Number: 4

Youth career
- –2014: Ull/Kisa
- 2015–2018: Lillestrøm
- 2019: Strømsgodset

Senior career*
| Years | Team | Apps | (Gls) |
| 2020 | Strømsgodset | 0 | (0) |
| 2020–2023 | Grorud | 57 | (2) |
| 2021 | → Notodden (loan) | 9 | (0) |
| 2023– | Sandefjord | 57 | (1) |

International career^{‡}
| 2017 | Norway U15 | 1 | (0) |
| 2019 | Norway U17 | 3 | (0) |
| 2020 | Norway U18 | 3 | (0) |
| 2021–2022 | Norway U20 | 4 | (0) |
- * Club domestic league appearances and goals as of 17 July 2026 ‡ National team caps and goals as of 29 August 2025

Fredrik Carson Pedersen (born 9 October 2002) is a Norwegian footballer who plays as a right back for Sandefjord.

== Career ==
He grew up in Jessheim. He went from the local team Ull/Kisa to the region's largest team Lillestrøm SK in 2015, and made his youth international debut for Norway in 2017. When taking the step from boys' 16 to boys' 19 teams, he also left his home region to join Strømsgodset IF in 2019. He was drafted into the senior team in 2020. However, already in mid-2020 he moved on to Grorud IL. He was loaned out to Notodden FK on the third tier in 2021, and experienced relegation to the third tier with Grorud in 2022.

His dream of playing in the Eliteserien was achieved when he was signed by Sandefjord Fotball in 2023. He was regarded as a replacement of Ian Smeulers. He made his Eliteserien debut in September against Odd.

After being a Sandefjord regular in the start of the 2024 Eliteserien, Pedersen was sidelined from July 2024 to April 2025. He had knee surgery in August 2024. His first Sandefjord goal came in late September 2025, clinching a victory against Haugesund with a "dream goal" from about 30 metres.
