= Herman Geelmuyden =

Norwegian footballer (born 2002)

Personal information
- Full name: Herman Hammy Geelmuyden
- Date of birth: 22 January 2002 (age 24)
- Place of birth: Stabekk, Norway
- Positions: Forward; winger

Team information
- Current team: Åsane
- Number: 7

Youth career
- –2017: Stabæk
- 2020–2021: PSV

Senior career*
Years	Team	Apps	(Gls)
2017–2019	Stabæk 2	30	(9)
2018–2019	Stabæk	5	(0)
2021–2025	Stabæk	91	(11)
2021–2025	Stabæk 2	14	(6)
2025	→ Åsane (loan)	6	(1)
2026–	Åsane	18	(2)

International career^{‡}
2017	Norway U15	6	(7)
2018	Norway U16	13	(5)
2019	Norway U17	11	(3)
2022	Norway U20	2	(0)
- * Club domestic league appearances and goals as of 14 November 2026 ‡ National team caps and goals as of 18 September 2025

Herman Hammy Geelmuyden (born 22 January 2002) is a Norwegian footballer who plays as a striker for Åsane.

== Career ==
=== Stabæk ===
Hailing from Stabekk, played in Stabæk Fotball from childhood. In 2017, Geelmuyden signed his first professional contract with Stabæk. He made his first-team debut in the 2019 Norwegian Football Cup, playing all of Stabæk's four cup matches in that campaign, and also scoring a goal in the second round. He made his league debut in June 2019 against Kristiansund.

=== PSV ===
After impressing in a few trials at PSV Eindhoven, Geelmuyden, whose contract with Stabæk expired at the end of 2019, joined the Dutch club in January 2020. Geelmuyden signed a deal until the summer of 2023 and was registered for the club's U19 squad. From the 2020–21 season, he was registered in the U18 squad.

== Career statistics ==
As of 8 July 2026

Appearances and goals by club, season and competition
Club	Season	League			National Cup		Total	
Club	Season	Division	Apps	Goals	Apps	Goals	Apps	Goals
Stabæk 2	2017	3. divisjon	3	1	—		3	1
Stabæk 2	2018	2. divisjon	10	2	—		10	2
Stabæk 2	2019	3. divisjon	17	6	—		17	6
Stabæk 2	Total		30	9	—		30	9
Stabæk	2019	Eliteserien	5	0	4	1	9	1
Stabæk	2021	Eliteserien	19	2	1	0	20	2
Stabæk	2022	1. divisjon	29	7	3	2	32	9
Stabæk	2023	Eliteserien	15	0	5	1	20	1
Stabæk	2024	1. divisjon	18	1	3	0	21	1
Stabæk	2025	1. divisjon	10	1	4	2	14	3
Stabæk	Total		91	11	16	5	107	16
Stabæk 2	2021	3. divisjon	1	1	—		1	1
Stabæk 2	2023	3. divisjon	5	3	—		5	3
Stabæk 2	2024	3. divisjon	5	2	—		5	2
Stabæk 2	2025	3. divisjon	3	0	—		3	0
Stabæk 2	Total		14	6	—		14	6
Åsane (loan)	2025	1. divisjon	6	1	0	0	6	1
Åsane	2026	1. divisjon	7	1	0	0	7	1
Career total		1. divisjon	153	28	16	5	173	33
