= Yaw Ihle Amankwah =

Norwegian footballer (born 1988)

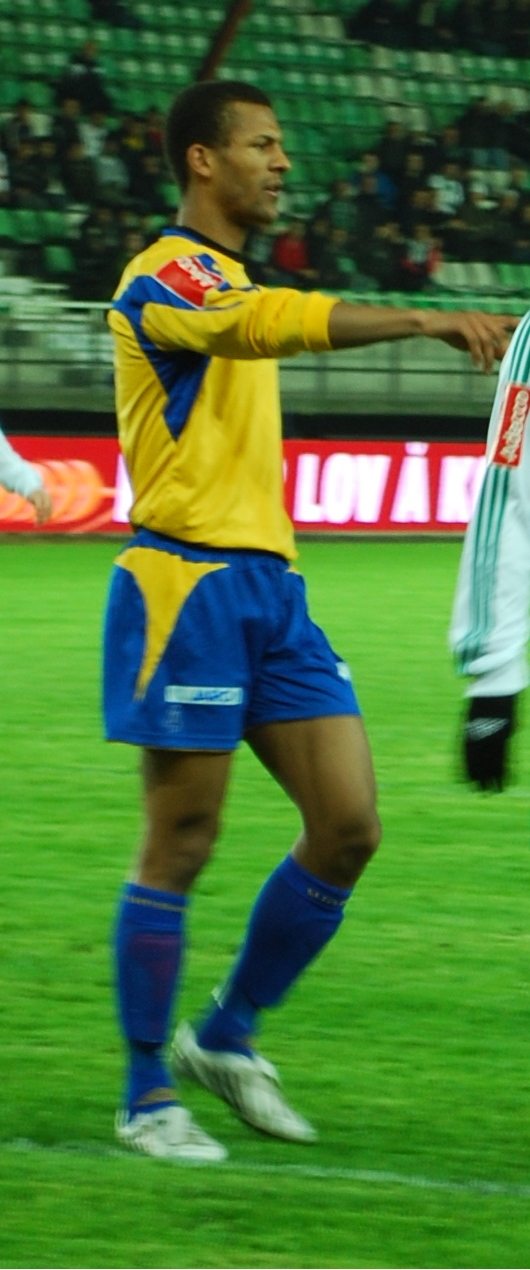

Personal information
- Full name: Yaw Ihle Amankwah
- Date of birth: 7 July 1988 (age 38)
- Place of birth: Bergen, Norway
- Height: 1.95 m (6 ft 5 in)
- Position: Centre back

Youth career
- –2007: Fana

Senior career*
Years	Team	Apps	(Gls)
2007–2011	Brann	32	(1)
2007	→ Fana (loan)	12	(0)
2009	→ Alta (loan)	26	(4)
2012–2015	Sandefjord	72	(2)
2016–2017	Tønsberg	19	(1)
2017–2019	Hobro IK	61	(2)
2019–2022	Stabæk	48	(2)
- * Club domestic league appearances and goals as of 11 October 2021

Yaw Ihle Amankwah (born 7 July 1988) is a Norwegian former professional footballer who played as a centre back.

== Career ==
Amankwah has a Ghanaian father and a Norwegian mother and was born in Bergen. After playing for Fana IL, Amankwah was bought by Brann in the summer of 2007, but was loaned out to Fana for the rest of the 2007 season. Amankwah made his debut for Brann on 28 June 2008, in 2009 he was loaned out to Alta IF. After playing 30 games for Alta in the 2009 season he returned to Brann in November 2009 to take part in the preparation for the 2010 season.

In January 2012 Amankwah joined Sandefjord Fotball.

After playing in the 2015 Tippeligaen, his contract was due to expire, and as he struggled somewhat with injuries the contract was not renewed. He signed for third-tier club FK Tønsberg.

Amankwah joined Hobro IK in the Danish 1st Division on 24 January 2017. He left the club at the end of the 2018/19 season. In Stabæk he became captain following the autumn 2020 sale of Andreas Hanche-Olsen.

== Career statistics ==
As of 11 October 2021

Club	Season	League			Domestic Cup		Continental		Total	
Club	Season	Division	Apps	Goals	Apps	Goals	Apps	Goals	Apps	Goals
Brann	2008	Eliteserien	4	0	1	0	–		5	0
Brann	2010	Eliteserien	20	1	0	0	–		20	1
Brann	2011	Eliteserien	8	0	3	0	–		11	0
Brann	Total		32	1	4	0	–	–	36	1
Alta (loan)	2009	1. divisjon	26	4	2	1	–		28	5
Alta (loan)	Total		26	4	2	1	–	–	28	5
Sandefjord	2012	1. divisjon	23	1	2	0	–		25	1
Sandefjord	2013	1. divisjon	25	0	2	0	–		27	0
Sandefjord	2014	1. divisjon	19	1	2	0	–		21	1
Sandefjord	2015	Eliteserien	5	0	3	0	–		8	0
Sandefjord	Total		72	2	9	0	–	–	81	2
Tønsberg	2016	2. divisjon	19	1	0	0	–		19	1
Tønsberg	Total		19	1	0	0	–	–	19	1
Hobro	2016–17	1st Division	14	2	0	0	–		14	2
Hobro	2017–18	Danish Superliga	23	0	2	0	–		25	0
Hobro	2018–19	Danish Superliga	24	0	0	0	–		24	0
Hobro	Total		61	2	2	0	–	–	63	2
Stabæk	2019	Eliteserien	15	1	0	0	–		15	1
Stabæk	2020	Eliteserien	20	0	0	0	–		20	0
Stabæk	2021	Eliteserien	13	1	1	0	–		14	1
Stabæk	Total		48	2	1	0	–	–	49	2
Career total			258	12	18	1	–	–	276	13

== Personal life ==
Amankwah is the cousin of Ghanaian defensive midfielder, Emmanuel Frimpong, who formerly played for Arsenal.
