= Kosuke Kinoshita =

Japanese footballer

Personal information
- Full name: Kosuke Kinoshita
- Date of birth: 3 October 1994 (age 32)
- Place of birth: Hamamatsu, Japan
- Height: 1.90 m (6 ft 3 in)
- Position: Forward

Team information
- Current team: Shimizu S-Pulse
- Number: 19

Youth career
- 2001–2006: Dreams SC Tokyo
- 2007–2012: Yokohama FC
- 2013–2014: SC Freiburg

Senior career*
Years	Team	Apps	(Gls)
2014–2016	SC Freiburg II	50	(14)
2016–2017	FC 08 Homburg	4	(1)
2017–2018	Halmstads BK	56	(17)
2019	Sint-Truiden	2	(1)
2019–2021	Stabæk	41	(6)
2021	Urawa Red Diamonds	2	(0)
2022	Mito HollyHock	38	(12)
2023	Kyoto Sanga	25	(3)
2024–2025	Kashiwa Reysol	52	(13)
2025–2026	Sanfrecce Hiroshima	39	(9)
2026–	Shimizu S-Pulse	1	(0)
- * Club domestic league appearances and goals as of 0 August 2026

Kosuke Kinoshita (木下 康介, Kinoshita Kōsuke; born 3 October 1994) is a Japanese footballer who plays as a forward for Shimizu S-Pulse. He became the first football player from Japan to play in Allsvenskan, the highest league in Sweden.

== Career statistics ==
=== Club ===
As of 1 October 2022

Appearances and goals by club, season and competition
Club	Season	League			National Cup		Europe		Total	
Club	Season	Division	Apps	Goals	Apps	Goals	Apps	Goals	Apps	Goals
Freiburg II	2013–14	Regionalliga Südwest	6	1	0	0	–		6	1
Freiburg II	2014–15	Regionalliga Südwest	21	7	0	0	–		21	7
Freiburg II	2015–16	Regionalliga Südwest	23	6	0	0	–		23	6
Freiburg II	Total		50	14	0	0	-	-	50	14
Homburg	2016–17	Regionalliga Südwest	4	1	0	0	–		4	1
Homburg	Total		4	1	0	0	-	-	4	1
Halmstad	2017	Allsvenskan	23	1	3	2	–		26	3
Halmstad	2018	Superettan	29	13	1	0	–		30	13
Halmstad	Total		52	14	4	2	-	-	56	16
Sint-Truidense	2018–19	Belgian First Division A	7	2	0	0	–		7	2
Sint-Truidense	Total		7	2	0	0	-	-	7	2
Stabæk	2019	Eliteserien	9	0	0	0	–		9	0
Stabæk	2020	Eliteserien	22	5	0	0	–		22	5
Stabæk	2021	Eliteserien	10	1	0	0	–		10	1
Stabæk	Total		41	6	0	0	-	-	41	6
Urawa Red Diamonds	2021	J1 League	2	0	0	0	–		2	0
Mito Hollyhock	2022	J2 League	35	11	0	0	–		35	11
Career total			191	47	4	2	-	-	195	49

== Honours ==
=== Club ===
Sanfrecce Hiroshima

- J.League Cup: 2025
