= Kaloyan Kostadinov =

Norwegian footballer (born 2002)

Personal information
- Full name: Kaloyan Kalinov Kostadinov
- Date of birth: 18 July 2002 (age 24)
- Place of birth: Gorna Oryahovitsa, Bulgaria
- Height: 1.84 m (6 ft 0 in)
- Position: Midfielder

Team information
- Current team: Sandnes Ulf
- Number: 7

Youth career
- –2019: Sandnes Ulf

Senior career*
Years	Team	Apps	(Gls)
2019–2020	Sandnes Ulf	5	(0)
2020–2025	Stabæk	71	(2)
2025–	Sandnes Ulf	23	(3)

International career^{‡}
2019	Norway U17	6	(0)
2020	Norway U18	3	(0)
2021	Norway U20	2	(0)
2023	Norway U21	2	(0)
- * Club domestic league appearances and goals as of 14 November 2026 ‡ National team caps and goals as of 28 October 2025

Kaloyan "Kay" Kalinov Kostadinov (Bulgarian: Калоян Калинов Костадинов; born 18 July 2002) is a Norwegian footballer who plays as a midfielder for Sandnes Ulf.

== Career ==
Coming through the youth system of Sandnes Ulf, he made his senior debut in the 2019 Norwegian Football Cup against Vard. He made his league debut in July 2019 against Notodden. This year he also made his debut for a Norwegian youth national team. At the end of the 2019–20 winter transfer window he agreed to a transfer to first-tier Stabæk. Albeit the transfer would happen in August 2020, he did not play any Sandnes Ulf games in 2020 and instead made his Stabæk debut in September 2020 against Odd.

On 12 September 2025, he returned to play for Sandnes Ulf on a contract for the rest of the year.

== International career ==
Kostadinov was born in Bulgaria to Bulgarian parents but moved to Norway in 2011, which makes him eligible for both Norway and Bulgaria national teams. He represented Norway from U17 to U21 level.
