= Bernt Torgersen =

Norwegian footballer (born 2003)

Personal information
- Full name: Kristian Bernt Torgersen
- Date of birth: 16 May 2003 (age 23)
- Position: Midfielder

Team information
- Current team: Norges Handelshøgskoles

Youth career
- Haslum
- –2015: Fornebu
- 2016–2020: Stabæk

Senior career*
Years	Team	Apps	(Gls)
2018–2021	Stabæk 2	13	(0)
2020–2022	Stabæk	9	(0)
2022–	Norges Handelshøgskoles		

International career^{‡}
2018	Norway U15	6	(0)
2019	Norway U16	14	(0)
2020	Norway U17	4	(1)
- * Club domestic league appearances and goals as of 20 May 2021 ‡ National team caps and goals as of 20 May 2021

Kristian Bernt Torgersen (born 16 May 2003) is a Norwegian football midfielder who plays for Norges Handelshøgskoles.

Hailing from Haslum in Bærum, he also played youth football for Fornebu FK before joining the youth ranks of Stabæk. He was also a Norwegian youth international from age 15. He signed a professional contract in August 2020, and made his senior debut in December 2020 against Strømsgodset. In the 2021 season opener against Odd, three days after his 18th birthday, he was in the starting eleven.

His hobbies include skateboarding and music producing.
