= Kornelius Normann Hansen =

Norwegian footballer (born 2001)

Kornelius Hansen
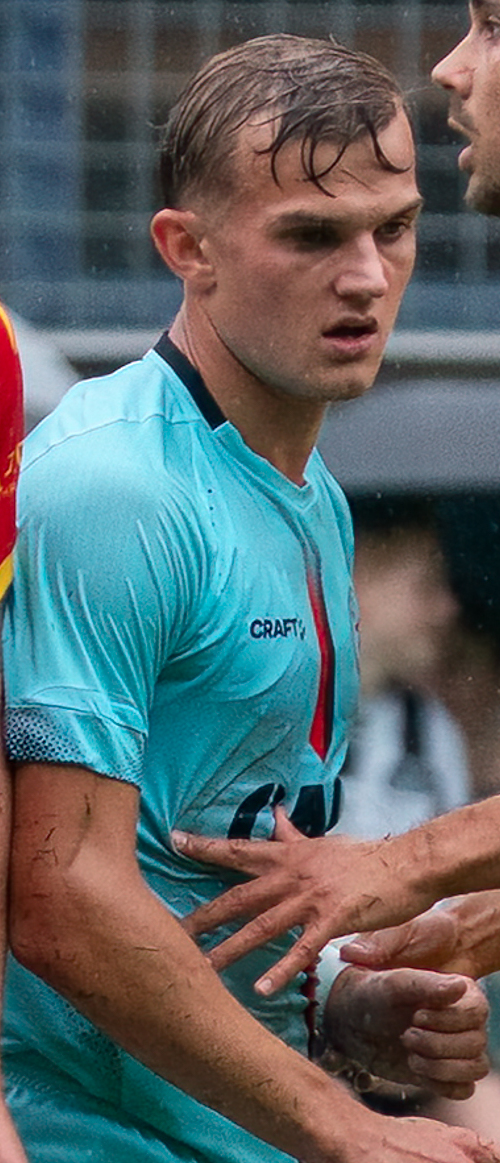

Personal information
- Full name: Kornelius Normann Hansen
- Date of birth: 6 May 2001 (age 25)
- Place of birth: Larvik, Norway
- Height: 1.75 m (5 ft 9 in)
- Position: Midfielder

Team information
- Current team: AaB
- Number: 11

Youth career
- –2016: Larvik Turn
- 2016: Strømsgodset
- 2017–2020: Southampton

Senior career*
| Years | Team | Apps | (Gls) |
| 2016 | Larvik Turn | 1 | (1) |
| 2017 | Fram Larvik | 6 | (1) |
| 2020–2023 | Stabæk | 76 | (14) |
| 2023–2025 | Almere City | 68 | (7) |
| 2025– | AaB | 24 | (9) |

International career^{‡}
| 2016 | Norway U15 | 9 | (7) |
| 2017 | Norway U16 | 13 | (8) |
| 2018 | Norway U17 | 10 | (4) |
| 2019 | Norway U18 | 11 | (3) |
- * Club domestic league appearances and goals as of 2 June 2026 ‡ National team caps and goals as of 29 June 2020

Kornelius Normann Hansen (born 6 May 2001) is a Norwegian footballer who plays as a midfielder for Danish club AaB.

== Career ==
=== Club ===
On 25 May 2020, Normann Hansen signed for Stabæk Fotball on a contract until the 2022 season, from Southampton Academy, where he had spent three years. He soon made his mark by scoring both goals in the 2–0 win against Strømsgodset, as well as the winning goal in the 2–1 match against Kristiansund.

On 10 January 2023, he moved to the Netherlands to join Eerste Divisie club Almere City on a two-and-a-half-year deal.

On 22 August 2025, Normann Hansen joined Danish 1st Division club AaB.

== Personal life ==
He is a brother of Kristoffer Normann Hansen.

== Career statistics ==
=== Club ===
As of match played 7 October 2025

Appearances and goals by club, season and competition
| Club | Season | League | | | National Cup (Note: All appearances in the Norwegian Football Cup) | | Europe | | Total | |
| Club | Season | Division | Apps | Goals | Apps | Goals | Apps | Goals | Apps | Goals |
|---|---|---|---|---|---|---|---|---|---|---|
| Larvik Turn | 2016 | 4. divisjon | 1 | 1 | 0 | 0 | — | | 1 | 1 |
| Larvik Turn | Total | | 1 | 1 | 0 | 0 | — | | 1 | 1 |
| Fram Larvik | 2017 | 2. divisjon | 6 | 1 | 0 | 0 | — | | 6 | 1 |
| Fram Larvik | Total | | 6 | 1 | 0 | 0 | — | | 6 | 1 |
| Stabæk | 2020 | Eliteserien | 27 | 5 | – | – | — | | 27 | 5 |
| Stabæk | 2021 | Eliteserien | 25 | 2 | 2 | 2 | — | | 27 | 4 |
| Stabæk | 2022 | 1. divisjon | 24 | 7 | 3 | 1 | — | | 27 | 7 |
| Stabæk | Total | | 76 | 14 | 5 | 3 | — | | 81 | 16 |
| Almere City | 2022–23 | Eerste Divisie | 9 | 1 | – | – | — | | 9 | 1 |
| Almere City | 2023–24 | Eredivisie | 26 | 4 | 3 | 5 | — | | 29 | 9 |
| Almere City | 2024–25 | Eredivisie | 33 | 2 | 1 | 0 | — | | 34 | 2 |
| Almere City | Total | | 68 | 7 | 4 | 5 | — | | 72 | 12 |
| AaB | 2025–26 | Danish 1st Division | 5 | 2 | 2 | 1 | — | | 7 | 3 |
| Career total | | | 156 | 25 | 10 | 8 | 0 | 0 | 166 | 33 |

== Honours ==
Individual

- KNVB Cup Top scorer 2023–24
