= Sammy Skytte =

Danish footballer (born 1997)

Personal information
- Full name: Sammy Solitaire Siddharta Skytte
- Date of birth: 20 February 1997 (age 29)
- Place of birth: Silkeborg, Denmark
- Height: 1.90 m (6 ft 3 in)
- Position: Midfielder

Team information
- Current team: NSÍ Runavík
- Number: 2

Youth career
- 2005–2012: Silkeborg KFUM
- 2012–2015: Silkeborg

Senior career*
Years	Team	Apps	(Gls)
2015–2018	Silkeborg	52	(2)
2018–2020	Midtjylland	0	(0)
2018–2019	→ Horsens (loan)	25	(0)
2019	→ Stabæk (loan)	13	(1)
2020	Bodø/Glimt	11	(2)
2020–2022	Stabæk	29	(2)
2022–2023	Concordia Chiajna	3	(0)
2024–2025	HB Tórshavn	39	(14)
2026	FA Šiauliai	8	(0)
2026–	NSÍ Runavík	10	(1)

International career
2014	Denmark U17	2	(0)
2014–2015	Denmark U18	5	(0)
2015–2016	Denmark U19	6	(0)
2017	Denmark U20	2	(0)
2017–2018	Denmark U21	2	(0)
- * Club domestic league appearances and goals as of 23:16, 26 October 2026 (UTC)

Sammy Solitaire Siddharta Skytte (born 20 February 1997) is a Danish professional footballer who plays as a midfielder for Faroe Islands Premier League club NSÍ Runavík.

== Youth career ==
Skytte started playing football at Silkeborg KFUM at the age of 8, before signing a youth contract in 2012 with Silkeborg IF.

== Club career ==
=== Silkeborg IF ===
Skytte is a product of Silkeborg IF and has played for the club since he was a kid. Skytte signed his first senior contract 12 August 2015, at the age of 18, after sitting on the bench for the first team in a game against Lyngby BK.

Skytte made his debut for Silkeborg IF on 22 September 2015. Though his young age, he played 5 matches in the rest of the season in the Danish 1st Division. Skytte suffered from a shoulder injury in May 2016 and went through an operation that kept him out for the rest of the season.

From the summer 2016, Skytte started to play on full-time with the rest of the squad, after completing his school. His contract got extended in December 2016 until 2019. This extension emphasized his important role on the team.

=== Midtjylland ===
FC Midtjylland announced the signing of Skytte on a five-year contract on 13 June 2018. Skytte was immediately loaned out to AC Horsens. Silkeborg IF later revealed that FCM had triggered his purchase clause that was set to 3.7 million danish krone.

On 8 July 2019, Skytte was loaned out to Norwegian club Stabæk Fotball.

=== Bodø/Glimt ===
Without making a single appearance for Midtjylland, the club confirmed on 25 February 2020, that Skytte had signed a 5-year contract with Norwegian club FK Bodø/Glimt.

=== Return to Stabæk ===
On 11 September 2020, Skytte returned to Stabæk, which he played for on loan in 2019. Skytte signed a contract until the end of 2023. After 45 official appearances and three goals for Stabæk, the club announced on 31 March 2022, that Skytte's contract had been terminated by mutual consent.

=== HB Tórshavn ===
In March 2024, Skytte signed a contract with HB Tórshavn.

He left the club at the end of the year and started training with Eliteserien club HamKam in early 2025. He ended up staying with HB Tórshavn, as he extended his contract with the club until the end of 2025 on February 24, 2025. At the end of 2025, he left the club again.

== Personal life ==
Skytte is the cousin of American football player, Andreas Knappe.

== Career statistics ==
As of match played 8 August 2021

Appearances and goals by club, season and competition
Club	Season	League			National cup (Note: Includes Danish Cup, Norwegian Cup)		Europe		Total	
Club	Season	Division	Apps	Goals	Apps	Goals	Apps	Goals	Apps	Goals
Silkeborg	2015–16	Danish 1st Division	9	0	0	0	—		9	0
Silkeborg	2016–17	Danish Superliga	19	1	0	0	—		19	1
Silkeborg	2017–18	Danish Superliga	23	0	3	0	—		26	0
Silkeborg	Total		51	1	3	0	—		54	1
AC Horsens (loan)	2018–19	Danish Superliga	25	0	1	0	—		26	0
Stabæk (loan)	2019	Eliteserien	13	1	0	0	—		13	1
Bodø/Glimt	2020	Eliteserien	11	2	0	0	–		11	2
Stabæk	2020	Eliteserien	14	0	0	0	—		14	0
Stabæk	2021	Eliteserien	15	2	2	0	—		17	2
Stabæk	Total		29	2	2	0	—		31	2
Career total			129	5	6	0	0	0	135	5

== Honours ==
Bodø/Glimt

- Eliteserien: 2020

NSÍ Runavík

- Faroe Islands Premier League: 2026
