= Jørgen Olsen Øveraas =

Norwegian footballer (born 1989)

Personal information
- Full name: Jørgen Olsen Øveraas
- Date of birth: 3 December 1989 (age 36)
- Place of birth: Trondheim, Norway
- Height: 1.83 m (6 ft 0 in)
- Position: Right-back

Youth career
- –2008: Strindheim

Senior career*
Years	Team	Apps	(Gls)
2011–2012	Strindheim	25	(4)
2013–2015	Ranheim	80	(0)
2016–2017	Sandnes Ulf	38	(1)
2018	Egersund	18	(0)
2019–2020	Ranheim	16	(1)
2020	Stabæk	18	(1)
2021	Sandnes Ulf	28	(0)
- * Club domestic league appearances and goals as of 20:10, 22 January 2023 (UTC)

Jørgen Olsen Øveraas (born 3 December 1989) is a Norwegian footballer who plays as a right-back.

He signed a contract with Stabæk in 2020. He previously played for Strindheim, Sandnes Ulf, Egersund and Ranheim. In 2022 and 2023, Øveraas played futsal at the highest level in Norway for Freidig Futsal.

== Career statistics ==
=== Club ===
As of match played 13 December 2020

Appearances and goals by club, season and competition
Club	Season	League			National Cup		Continental		Total	
Club	Season	Division	Apps	Goals	Apps	Goals	Apps	Goals	Apps	Goals
Strindheim	2011	2. divisjon	2	1	0	0	-		2	1
Strindheim	2012	3. divisjon	23	3	3	0	-		26	3
Strindheim	Total		25	4	3	0	-	-	28	4
Ranheim	2013	1. divisjon	24	0	4	0	-		28	0
Ranheim	2014	1. divisjon	27	0	4	0	-		31	0
Ranheim	2015	1. divisjon	29	0	2	0	-		31	0
Ranheim	Total		80	0	10	0	-	-	90	0
Sandnes Ulf	2016	1. divisjon	30	1	4	0	-		34	1
Sandnes Ulf	2017	1. divisjon	8	0	1	0	-		9	0
Sandnes Ulf	Total		38	1	5	0	-	-	43	1
Egersunds	2018	2. divisjon	18	0	3	0	-		21	0
Egersunds	Total		18	0	3	0	-	-	21	0
Ranheim	2019	Eliteserien	16	1	3	0	-		19	1
Ranheim	Total		16	1	3	0	-	-	19	1
Stabæk	2020	Eliteserien	18	1	0	0	-		18	1
Stabæk	Total		18	1	0	0	-	-	18	1
Sandnes Ulf	2021	OBOS-ligaen	0	0	0	0	-		0	0
Sandnes Ulf	Total		0	0	0	0	-	-	0	0
Career total			195	7	24	0	-	-	219	7
