= Magnus Strandman Lundal =

Norwegian footballer (born 2000)

Personal information
- Date of birth: 6 April 2000 (age 26)
- Position: Midfielder

Team information
- Current team: Bærum
- Number: 24

Youth career
- –2015: Vestre Aker
- 2015–2019: Stabæk

Senior career*
Years	Team	Apps	(Gls)
2020	Stabæk	14	(1)
2022–2023	Grorud	12	(1)
2023–	Bærum	1	(0)

International career^{‡}
2015	Norway U15	2	(0)
- * Club domestic league appearances and goals as of 25 October 2023 ‡ National team caps and goals as of 9 July 2023

Magnus Strandman Lundal (born 6 April 2000) is a Norwegian football midfielder who plays for Bærum.

Growing up in Vestre Aker IF, he joined Stabæk's youth system at the age of 15 while also representing Norway as a youth international. He made his debut for Stabæk in a 2019 Norwegian Football Cup thrashing of Elverum, and made his league debut in June 2020 against Sandefjord. After signing with the first team in May 2020, he was not loaned out because none of the lower leagues had started again after the COVID-19 pandemic.

== Career statistics ==
As of match played 20 September 2020

Appearances and goals by club, season and competition
Club	Season	League			National Cup		Total	
Club	Season	Division	Apps	Goals	Apps	Goals	Apps	Goals
Stabæk	2019	Eliteserien	0	0	1	0	1	0
Stabæk	2020	Eliteserien	14	1	–		14	1
Stabæk	Total		14	1	1	0	15	1
Career total			14	1	1	0	15	1
