= Bærum SK =

Norwegian football club

- Full name: Bærum Sportsklubb
- Founded: 26 March 1910; 115 years ago
- Ground: Sandvika stadion, Sandvika
- Capacity: 2,000
- Chairman: Carl-Christian Wishman
- Head coach: Jan-Derek Sørensen
- League: 3. divisjon
- 2024: 3. divisjon group 3, 5th of 14
Home colours	Away colours

Bærum Sportsklubb is a Norwegian association football club founded on 26 March 1910. The men's team is currently playing in the 3. divisjon, after being relegated from the 2. divisjon in 2023.

The club comes from Sandvika, the administrative centre of the municipality Bærum. The club was formed as Grane FK, but quickly changed its name to Grane SK to include different sporting codes. The club changed its name to IL Mode in 1946 after a merger with workers' sports team Sandvika AIL. It took its current name in 1969.

Bærum have won Norwegian Championships in ice hockey, team handball and bandy, but now operates as a football-only club. The club's finest hour took place in 2004 when the team beat Vålerenga 3–2 in the third round of the Norwegian Cup.

The team plays in yellow shirts and black shorts. The away strip for 2010 is light blue shirts and white shorts. The club now plays at Sandvika stadion, the club's traditional home ground, after having played its home games at Nadderud stadion for more than 30 years. The pitch was resurfaced with artificial turf in 2003.

== History ==
In 2002, Bærum was promoted to 1. divisjon after winning their 2. divisjon group. Their stay in the 1. divisjon only lasted for one season, as they were relegated back to the Second Division in 2003.

The 2005 season ended with the club landing a disappointing fourth spot in the 2. divisjon table behind Sparta Sarpsborg, SK Vard Haugesund and Notodden FK. In December 2005 coach Arild Stavrum left the club after only one season in charge to take over 2005 Cup winners Molde FK. Jarle Hellesnes was appointed new head coach after Stavrum's departure. In 2006 Bærum secured second place in the league, two points behind Notodden.

The 2007 season was a disappointing one for the club. After good results in pre-season warm-up games and several good signings, the club was rated among the favourites for promotion. However, the team almost collapsed when real points were at stake. The club finished in sixth place, 19 points behind promoted IL Hødd. The only highlight during 2007 came when the team outplayed and beat Ham-Kam 2-0 in the second round of the Norwegian Cup. Ham-Kam were top of the 1. divisjon and unbeaten away from home at the time the game took place. Coach Jarle Hellesnes resigned before the season was over, with the resignation taking effect after the last game of 2007. Tomi Markovski, a former youth player for the club, who had led Asker from the 3. divisjon to second place in the 2. divisjon is the club's new head coach. His first season in Bærum was not as good as expected. Bærum finished fifth in the end, after losing most of the games after the summer.

== Recent history ==
Season		Pos.	Pl.	W	D	L	GS	GA	P	Cup	Notes
2002	2. divisjon	↑ 1	26	17	6	3	78	37	57	3rd round	Promoted
2003	1. divisjon	↓ 13	30	7	6	17	34	58	27	2nd round	Relegated
2004	2. divisjon	2	26	17	2	7	75	31	53	4th round	
2005	2. divisjon	4	26	14	6	6	66	42	48	2nd round	
2006	2. divisjon	2	26	17	5	4	60	28	56	2nd round	
2007	2. divisjon	6	26	11	5	10	55	42	38	3rd round	
2008	2. divisjon	5	26	15	1	10	62	39	46	1st round	
2009	2. divisjon	7	26	13	3	10	61	46	42	3rd round	
2010	2. divisjon	7	26	10	5	11	52	44	35	2nd round	
2011	2. divisjon	↑ 1	24	15	6	3	75	30	51	2nd round	Promoted
2012	1. divisjon	↓ 14	30	5	7	18	49	73	22	2nd round	Relegated
2013	2. divisjon	↑ 1	26	19	3	4	84	38	60	2nd round	Promoted
2014	1. divisjon	5	30	15	4	11	51	52	49	2nd round	
2015	1. divisjon	↓ 15	30	8	7	15	44	67	31	3rd round	Relegated
2016	2. divisjon	2	26	14	5	7	55	42	47	3rd round	
2017	2. divisjon	9	26	8	9	9	46	44	33	2nd round	
2018	2. divisjon	8	26	12	4	10	44	33	40	3rd round	
2019	2. divisjon	10	26	7	8	11	39	55	29	4th round	
2020	2. divisjon	11	13	1	8	4	13	18	11	Cancelled	
2021	2. divisjon	9	26	9	3	14	41	51	30	1st round	
2022	2. divisjon	10	26	9	4	13	36	46	31	1st round	
2023	2. divisjon	↓ 12	26	7	5	14	44	61	26	3rd round	Relegated
2024	3. divisjon	5	26	13	7	6	61	47	46	2nd round	
2025	3. divisjon	3	26	15	4	7	77	41	49	1st round	
2026	3. divisjon									1st round	

== Notable players ==
Bærum's most famous players youth team was the boys' 1994 team, which included Marius Lundemo, Simen Juklerød, Daniel Granli, Markus Fjørtoft, Chris Wingate and Borger Thomas (the latter born in 1995). Other famous players include Lars Bohinen, Vidar Davidsen, Christer Basma and Thomas Finstad, as well as German journeyman goalkeeper Lutz Pfannenstiel.

== Current squad ==
As of 14 September 2023.

Note: Flags indicate national team as defined under FIFA eligibility rules; some limited exceptions apply. Players may hold more than one non-FIFA nationality.

No.	Pos.	Nation	Player
1	GK	NOR	Daniel Skretteberg
2	DF	NOR	Peder Vogt
3	DF	NOR	Anders Johan Johansen
4	DF	NOR	Almin Dacic
5	DF	NOR	August Frobenius
6	MF	NOR	Henning Hauger
7	FW	NOR	Lasse Bransdal
8	MF	NOR	Edvard Khachatrjan
9	MF	NOR	Marius Augdal
10	FW	NOR	Rasmus Sørensen Løvseth
11	MF	NOR	Mathias Ødegaard Aasen
14	MF	NOR	Christian Selvær Arvesen

No.	Pos.	Nation	Player
15	DF	NOR	Jon Øya
17	MF	NOR	Max Benjamin Myrmo
18	FW	GAM	Jibril Bojang
19	DF	NOR	Kristoffer Haugen
20	FW	NOR	Kristoffer Sørensen
21	GK	NOR	Julius Skrefsrud
22	DF	NOR	Jesper Tuven Holter
23	MF	NOR	Marius Hagen
24	MF	NOR	Magnus Strandman Lundal
25	MF	NOR	Eirik Holm
30	DF	NOR	Joakim Østvold

For season transfers, see transfers winter 2020–21 and transfers summer 2021.
