= 2019 Mjøndalen IF Fotball season =

Mjøndalen
2019 season
- Manager: Vegard Hansen
- Stadium: Consto Arena
- Eliteserien: 13th
- Norwegian Cup: Quarterfinal vs Haugesund
- Top goalscorer: League: Tonny Brochmann (8); All: Two Players (8)
Home colours	Away colours

The 2019 season was Mjøndalen IF's first season back in the Eliteserien since 2015.

== Squad ==
Note: Flags indicate national team as defined under FIFA eligibility rules; some limited exceptions apply. Players may hold more than one non-FIFA nationality.

No.	Pos.	Nation	Player
2	DF	NED	Quint Jansen
3	DF	NOR	Vetle Dragsnes
4	DF	NOR	William Sell
5	DF	NOR	Alexander Hansen
6	DF	NOR	Joackim Solberg
7	MF	DEN	Tonny Brochmann
8	FW	NOR	Fredrik Brustad
9	FW	NOR	Sondre Liseth
10	FW	CAN	Olivier Occéan
11	MF	NOR	Christian Gauseth (captain)
12	GK	NOR	Julian Lund (on loan from Rosenborg)
13	GK	NOR	Erik Hejer

No.	Pos.	Nation	Player
15	MF	NOR	Mathias Fredriksen
19	MF	SWE	Pontus Silfwer
20	DF	NGA	Akeem Latifu
22	FW	SWE	Jacob Bergström
23	DF	NOR	Sondre Johansen
24	DF	NOR	Erick Sagbakken
25	GK	CMR	Georges Bokwé
30	MF	NOR	Aristide Sagbakken
31	FW	GAM	Jibril Bojang
32	GK	POR	Jorge Vieira
33	MF	NOR	Stian Aasmundsen
34	DF	NOR	Per Steiring (on loan from Sogndal)

=== Out on loan ===
Note: Flags indicate national team as defined under FIFA eligibility rules; some limited exceptions apply. Players may hold more than one non-FIFA nationality.

No.	Pos.	Nation	Player
14	MF	CIV	Vamouti Diomande (at Ullensaker/Kisa until 31 December 2019)
16	MF	ISL	Dagur Þórhallsson (at Kvik Halden until 31 December 2019)
18	FW	NOR	Andreas Hellum (at Strømmen until 31 December 2019)

No.	Pos.	Nation	Player
21	FW	NOR	Alfred Scriven (at Ullensaker/Kisa until 31 December 2019)
26	DF	NOR	Adrian Hansen (at Fram Larvik until 31 December 2019)

== Transfers ==
=== In ===
Date	Position	Nationality	Name	From	Fee	Ref.
23 December 2018	FW	(Norway)	Sondre Liseth	Nest-Sotra	Undisclosed	
11 January 2019	FW	(Norway)	Fredrik Brustad	Molde	Undisclosed	
3 February 2019	DF	(Nigeria)	Akeem Latifu	Sogndal	Undisclosed	
24 March 2019	MF	(Norway)	Stian Aasmundsen	Kristiansund	Undisclosed	
1 August 2019	MF	(Iceland)	Dagur Þórhallsson	Keflavík	Undisclosed	
1 August 2019	MF	(Sweden)	Pontus Silfwer	Halmstad	Undisclosed	
26 August 2019	FW	(Sweden)	Jacob Bergström	Mjällby	Undisclosed	
27 August 2019	GK	(Portugal)	Jorge Vieira	Ørn Horten	Undisclosed	

=== Loans in ===
Date from	Position	Nationality	Name	to	Date to	Ref.
11 January 2019	MF	(Iceland)	Dagur Þórhallsson	Keflavík	End of season	
22 March 2019	GK	(Norway)	Julian Lund	Rosenborg	End of season	
28 March 2019	GK	(Norway)	Mathias Ranmark	Molde	5 August 2019	
4 September 2019	DF	(Norway)	Per Steiring	Sogndal	End of Season	

=== Out ===
Date	Position	Nationality	Name	To	Fee	Ref.
10 November 2018	MF	(Norway)	Jonathan Lindseth	Sarpsborg 08	Undisclosed	

=== Loans out ===
Date from	Position	Nationality	Name	to	Date to	Ref.
25 February 2019	FW	(Norway)	Andreas Hellum	Strømmen	End of Season	
14 March 2019	MF	(Norway)	Sebastian Hansen	Notodden	End of Season	
29 June 2019	DF	(Norway)	Erick Sagbakken	Levanger	13 July 2019	
17 July 2019	DF	(Norway)	Adrian Hansen	Fram Larvik	End of Season	
1 August 2019	FW	(Norway)	Alfred Scriven	Ull/Kisa	End of Season	
7 August 2019	MF	(Iceland)	Dagur Þórhallsson	Kvik Halden	End of Season	
9 August 2019	MF	(Ivory Coast)	Vamouti Diomande	Ull/Kisa	End of Season	

=== Released ===
Date	Position	Nationality	Name	Joined	Date	Ref.
15 November 2018	FW	(Senegal)	Ousseynou Boye	El Gouna	15 March 2019	
30 November 2018	MF	(Norway)	Mads Gundersen	Åssiden	14 December 2018	
9 September 2019	GK	(Iran)	Sosha Makani	Naft Masjed Soleyman		
6 December 2019	FW	(Canada)	Olivier Occéan	Urædd		
6 December 2019	MF	(Norway)	Henrik Gulden			
6 December 2019	FW	(The Gambia)	Jibril Bojang	Masr		
31 December 2019	DF	(Norway)	Erick Sagbakken			

== Competitions ==
=== Eliteserien ===
==== Results summary ====
Overall								Home						Away					
Pld	W	D	L	GF	GA	GD	Pts	W	D	L	GF	GA	GD	W	D	L	GF	GA	GD
30	6	12	12	38	52	−14	30	5	6	4	22	22	0	1	6	8	16	30	−14

Last updated: 1 December 2019.
Source: Results

==== Results by round ====
Round	1	2	3	4	5	6	7	8	9	10	11	12	13	14	15	16	17	18	19	20	21	22	23	24	25	26	27	28	29	30
Ground	A	H	A	H	A	H	A	H	A	H	H	A	H	A	H	A	H	A	H	A	H	A	H	A	H	A	H	A	H	A
Result	L	L	W	D	D	W	L	D	L	L	D	D	D	D	W	D	L	W	L	L	D	L	L	D	D	D	L	W	L	W
Position	14	16	11	9	13	7	9	9	11	13	13	14	14	14	11	11	12	11	13	13	13	14	14	15	16	15	15	14	15	13

Updated to match(es) played on 1 December 2019. Source: Results
A = Away; H = Home; W = Win; D = Draw; L = Loss

==== Results ====
30 March 2019 1	Vålerenga	2–0	Mjøndalen	Oslo
17:00 CEST (UTC+2)	Vilhjálmsson 19', 69'; Bjørdal (yellow card) 41'; Vega (yellow card) 80'	Report	Liseth (yellow card) 49'	Stadium: Intility Arena; Attendance: 8,055; Referee: Kristoffer Hagenes

6 April 2019 2	Mjøndalen	4–5	Bodø/Glimt	Mjøndalen
18:00 CEST (UTC+2)	Brochmann 45+1' (yellow card) 56'; Johansen 48'; Sell 60' (yellow card) 82'; Scriven 90+7'	Report	Konradsen 20'; Moberg 36' (pen.); Lode (yellow card) 45+1'; Herrem 71', 75'; Sigurjónsson (yellow card) 84'; Evjen 90+11'	Stadium: Consto Arena; Attendance: 2,211; Referee: Ola Hobber Nilsen

12 April 2019 3	Strømsgodset	2–3	Mjøndalen	Drammen
19:00 CEST (UTC+2)	Sætra 11' (yellow card) 86'; Pedersen (yellow card) 28'; Ringstad (yellow card) 32'; Abdellaoue 64'; Pellegrino (yellow card) 80'; Hove (yellow card) 84'	Report	Johansen 8'; Aasmundsen 19'; Occéan 40'; Solberg (yellow card) 61'; Gauseth (yellow card) 90'	Stadium: Marienlyst Stadion; Attendance: 8,505; Referee: Dag Vidar Hafsås

22 April 2019 4	Mjøndalen	1–1	Tromsø	Mjøndalen
18:00 CEST (UTC+2)	Brochmann 11' (pen.); Scriven (yellow card) 70'	Report	Jenssen (yellow card) 15'; Valakari 54'	Stadium: Consto Arena; Attendance: 2,058; Referee: Espen Eskås

27 April 2019 5	Sarpsborg 08	1–1	Mjøndalen	Sarpsborg
18:00 CEST (UTC+2)	Halvorsen (yellow card) 23'; Lindseth (yellow card) 30'; Næss 55'; Horn (yellow card) 79'	Report	Brochmann (yellow card) 10'; Gauseth 17'; Solberg (yellow card) 45'	Stadium: Sarpsborg Stadion; Attendance: 5,451; Referee: Tom Harald Hagen

4 May 2019 6	Mjøndalen	1–0	Stabæk	Mjøndalen
18:00 CEST (UTC+2)	Gauseth (yellow card) 19'; Jansen (yellow card) 63'; Liseth 90+3'	Report	Brynhildsen (yellow card) 38'	Stadium: Consto Arena; Attendance: 2,236; Referee: Tore Hansen

12 May 2019 7	Molde	1–0	Mjøndalen	Molde
18:00 CEST (UTC+2)	Omoijuanfo (penalty missed) 48'; Haraldseid 61'	Report	Johansen (yellow card) 84'	Stadium: Aker Stadion; Attendance: 6,995; Referee: Trond Ivar Døvle

16 May 2019 8	Mjøndalen	2–2	Lillestrøm	Mjøndalen
18:45 CEST (UTC+2)	Johansen 33' (yellow card) 58'; Brochmann 45+2' (yellow card) 90+1'; Brustad (yellow card) 63'	Report	Salquist 60'; Olsen 78'	Stadium: Consto Arena; Attendance: 2,380; Referee: Kristoffer Hagenes

19 May 2019 9	Rosenborg	3–2	Mjøndalen	Trondheim
18:00 CEST (UTC+2)	Reginiussen 27' de Lanlay 30'; Søderlund 66'; Meling (yellow card) 84'; Helland (yellow card) 90'	Report	Johansen (yellow card) 36'; Aasmundsen 39'; Brochmann 65'; Liseth (yellow card) 81'	Stadium: Lerkendal Stadion; Attendance: 13,038; Referee: Tom Harald Hagen

26 May 2019 10	Mjøndalen	1–4	Haugesund	Mjøndalen
18:00 CEST (UTC+2)	Aasmundsen (yellow card) 64'; Solberg (yellow card) 66' (yellow-red card) 69'; Occéan 76'	Report	Wadji 21', 41', 72'; Leite 86'	Stadium: Consto Arena; Attendance: 1,963; Referee: Espen Eskås

16 June 2019 11	Mjøndalen	1–1	Kristiansund	Mjøndalen
18:00 CEST (UTC+2)	Gauseth 21'; Bojang (yellow card) 80'	Report	Bye (yellow card) 59'; Diop 85'; P.Ulvestad (yellow card) 90+2'	Stadium: Consto Arena; Attendance: 1,978; Referee: Trygve Kjensli

23 June 2019 12	Ranheim	1–1	Mjøndalen	Trondheim
18:00 CEST (UTC+2)	Skarsem (yellow card) 18'; Karlsen 29'; Tønne (yellow card) 53'	Report	Jansen 15'; Johansen (yellow card) 45'	Stadium: EXTRA Arena; Attendance: 2,044; Referee: Trond Ivar Døvle

30 June 2019 13	Mjøndalen	1–1	Viking	Mjøndalen
18:00 CEST (UTC+2)	Scriven 54'; Solberg (yellow card) 71'	Report	Høiland 38'; Thorstvedt (yellow card) 82'; Vikstøl (yellow card) 89'	Stadium: Consto Arena; Attendance: 2,550; Referee: Kai Erik Steen

5 July 2019 14	Brann	0–0	Mjøndalen	Bergen
19:00 CEST (UTC+2)		Report	Jansen (yellow card) 52'; Aasmundsen (yellow card) 82'; Liseth (yellow card) 90'	Stadium: Brann Stadion; Attendance: 10,039; Referee: Tom Harald Hagen

14 July 2019 15	Mjøndalen	2–0	Odd	Mjøndalen
18:00 CEST (UTC+2)	Occéan 57'; Brochmann (yellow card) 65' (goal) 83' (pen.); Brustad (yellow card) 65'; Lund (yellow card) 87'	Report	Ruud (yellow card) 48'; Rossbach (yellow card) 84'	Stadium: Consto Arena; Attendance: 2,358; Referee: Trond Ivar Døvle

4 August 2019 16	Tromsø	2–2	Mjøndalen	Tromsø
18:00 CEST (UTC+2)	Valakari 37'; Azemi 51'	Report	Gauseth 54'; Liseth 67'	Stadium: Alfheim Stadion; Attendance: 3,101; Referee: Dag Vidar Hafsås

12 August 2019 17	Lillestrøm	3–2	Mjøndalen	Lillestrøm
19:00 CEST (UTC+2)	Smárason 13' (pen.); Mikalsen 36'; Solberg 48' (o.g.)	Report	Occéan 10', 70'; Solberg (yellow card) 29'; Silfwer (yellow card) 43'; Aasmundsen (yellow card) 87'	Stadium: Åråsen Stadion; Attendance: 5,544; Referee: Trygve Kjensli

18 August 2019 18	Mjøndalen	2–1	Brann	Mjøndalen
18:00 CEST (UTC+2)	Aasmundsen 8' (yellow card) 44'; Jansen (yellow card) 16'; Brochmann (yellow card) 46'; Dragsnes 59'	Report	Bamba 19'; Berisha (yellow card) 83'; Wormgoor (yellow card) 90+2'	Stadium: Consto Arena; Attendance: 2,614; Referee: Trond Ivar Døvle

25 August 2019 19	Kristiansund	4–0	Mjøndalen	Kristiansund
18:00 CEST (UTC+2)	Psyché 14'; Sørli 45'; Pellegrino 47'; Kastrati 59'	Report		Stadium: Kristiansund Stadion; Attendance: 3,820; Referee: Sigurd Kringstad

1 September 2019 20	Mjøndalen	1–3	Molde	Mjøndalen
18:00 CEST (UTC+2)	Johansen (yellow card) 30'; Liseth 90+1'; Occéan (yellow card) 90+5'	Report	Omoijuanfo 25'; Knudtzon 55'; Gabrielsen (yellow card) 79'; E.Hestad 90+2'	Stadium: Consto Arena; Attendance: 2,314; Referee: Espen Eskås

15 September 2019 21	Haugesund	0–0	Mjøndalen	Haugesund
18:00 CEST (UTC+2)	Samuelsen (yellow card) 84'	Report		Stadium: Haugesund Stadion; Attendance: 3,512; Referee: Tore Hansen

22 September 2019 22	Mjøndalen	1–2	Rosenborg	Mjøndalen
20:00 CEST (UTC+2)	Occéan 6'	Report	Søderlund 15' (pen.); Solberg 51' (o.g.); Lundemo (yellow card) 67'	Stadium: Consto Arena; Attendance: 2,462; Referee: Ola Hobber Nilsen

30 September 2019 23	Viking	4–1	Mjøndalen	Stavanger
19:00 CEST (UTC+2)	Østensen 31'; Källman 58'; Hove 70'; Furdal 80'	Report	Johansen 5'; Dragsnes (yellow card) 12'	Stadium: Viking Stadion; Attendance: 6,500; Referee: Dag Vidar Hafsås

4 October 2019 24	Mjøndalen	1–1	Strømsgodset	Mjøndalen
19:00 CEST (UTC+2)	Brustad 52'; Solberg (yellow card) 88'	Report	Salvesen 67'; Keita (yellow card) 87'; Tchamba (yellow card) 90+3'	Stadium: Consto Arena; Attendance: 3,350; Referee: Svein Oddvar Moen

21 October 2019 25	Bodø/Glimt	0–0	Mjøndalen	Bodø
19:00 CEST (UTC+2)		Report	Aasmundsen (yellow card) 72'; Al.Hansen (yellow card) 90+1'	Stadium: Aspmyra Stadion; Attendance: 2,782; Referee: Tommy Skjerven

27 October 2019 26	Mjøndalen	0–0	Sarpsborg 08	Mjøndalen
18:00 CET (UTC+1)		Report	Ødegaard (yellow card) 49'	Stadium: Consto Arena; Attendance: 2,273; Referee: Ola Hobber Nilsen

4 November 2019 27	Odd	3–2	Mjøndalen	Skien
19:00 CET (UTC+1)	Børven 45+2', 78' (pen.); Lund 84' (pen.)	Report	Brochmann 24'; Silfwer (yellow card) 42'; Dragsnes 72'	Stadium: Skagerak Arena; Attendance: 4,492; Referee: Trygve Kjensli

10 November 2019 28	Mjøndalen	3–1	Ranheim	Mjøndalen
18:00 CET (UTC+1)	Brochmann 31' (pen.); Gauseth 66'; Johansen 71'	Report	Erlien 25'	Stadium: Consto Arena; Attendance: 2,077; Referee: Svein Oddvar Moen

24 November 2019 29	Stabæk	4–2	Mjøndalen	Bærum
18:00 CET (UTC+1)	Askildsen 18'; Junker 60', 63', 80' (yellow card) 73'	Report	Gauseth 22'; Dragsnes (yellow card) 39'; Brochmann 68'	Stadium: Nadderud Stadion; Attendance: 3,106; Referee: Tommy Skjerven

1 December 2019 30	Mjøndalen	1–0	Vålerenga	Mjøndalen
18:00 CET (UTC+1)	Brustad 53'; Liseth (yellow card) 82'	Report	Adekugbe (yellow card) 23'	Stadium: Consto Arena; Attendance: 2,321; Referee: Kai Erik Steen

==== Table ====
Pos	Team	Pld	W	D	L	GF	GA	GD	Pts	Qualification or relegation
11	Strømsgodset	30	8	8	14	41	54	−13	32	
12	Sarpsborg 08	30	5	15	10	30	40	−10	30	
13	Mjøndalen	30	6	12	12	38	52	−14	30	
14	Lillestrøm (R)	30	7	9	14	32	47	−15	30	Qualification for the relegation play-offs
15	Tromsø (R)	30	8	6	16	39	58	−19	30	Relegation to First Division

Source: Football Association of Norway (in Norwegian), Soccerway
Rules for classification: 1) Points; 2) Goal difference; 3) Goals scored; 4) Head-to-head points; 5) Head-to-head goal difference; 6) Head-to-head away goals scored (only if between two teams); 7) Head-to-head goals scored; 8) Play-off (only used to decide champions or relegation).
(R) Relegated

=== Norwegian Cup ===
1 May 2019 First Round	Hønefoss	0–2	Mjøndalen	Hønefoss
19:00 CEST (UTC+2)	S.Bukten (yellow card) 38'; Patterson (yellow card) 63'	Report	Brustad 54', 87'	Stadium: AKA Arena; Attendance: 480; Referee: Harald Røvig Sletner

22 May 2019 Second Round	Pors Grenland	2–4	Mjøndalen	Porsgrunn
18:00 CEST (UTC+2)	Shala 19', 63' (pen.); J.Sandnes (yellow card) 80'	Report	Johansen 8'; Brustad 22'; Liseth 49' (pen.); Jansen (yellow card) 62'; Bojang 69'; Aasmundsen (yellow card) 77'	Stadium: Pors Stadion; Attendance: 343; Referee: Sander Magdalon Bråten

19 June 2019 Third Round	Grorud	0–1	Mjøndalen	Oslo
18:00 CEST (UTC+2)	F.Ahmed (yellow card) 57'; P.Mankowitz (yellow card) 70'; V.Skåttun (yellow card) 90+1'	Report	Johansen 18'; Gauseth (yellow card) 59'	Stadium: Grorud Matchbane; Attendance: 540; Referee: Sigurd Smehus Kringstad

26 June 2019 Fourth Round	Kongsvinger	0–3	Mjøndalen	Kongsvinger
18:00 CEST (UTC+2)	Jalasto (red card) 42'	Report	Aasmundsen 49', 72'; Solberg (yellow card) 59'; Johansen 64'	Stadium: Gjemselund Stadion; Attendance: 1,223; Referee: Espen Eskås

25 September 2019 Quarterfinal	Mjøndalen	1–3	Haugesund	Mjøndalen
20:00 CEST (UTC+2)	Solberg (yellow card) 51'; Bergström (yellow card) 77'; Occéan 84'	Report	Pedersen 18'; Tronstad (yellow card) 23'; Samuelsen 65'; Krygård (yellow card) 82'; Kallevåg 86'	Stadium: Consto Arena; Attendance: 1,141; Referee: Kristoffer Hagenes

== Squad statistics ==
As of match played 1 December 2019

=== Appearances and goals ===
No.	Pos	Nat	Player	Total		Eliteserien		Norwegian Cup	
No.	Pos	Nat	Player	Apps	Goals	Apps	Goals	Apps	Goals
2	DF	(Netherlands) NED	Quint Jansen	34	1	28+1	1	4+1	0
3	DF	(Norway) NOR	Vetle Dragsnes	33	2	23+5	2	5	0
4	DF	(Norway) NOR	William Sell	30	1	16+10	1	3+1	0
5	DF	(Norway) NOR	Alexander Hansen	12	0	2+6	0	3+1	0
6	DF	(Norway) NOR	Joackim Solberg	30	0	26+1	0	3	0
7	MF	(Denmark) DEN	Tonny Brochmann	31	8	29	8	2	0
8	FW	(Norway) NOR	Fredrik Brustad	33	5	21+9	2	2+1	3
9	FW	(Norway) NOR	Sondre Liseth	29	4	21+3	3	5	1
10	FW	(Canada) CAN	Olivier Occéan	28	7	19+6	6	2+1	1
11	MF	(Norway) NOR	Christian Gauseth	26	5	24	5	2	0
12	GK	(Norway) NOR	Julian Lund	28	0	25	0	3	0
15	MF	(Norway) NOR	Mathias Fredriksen	2	0	0+2	0	0	0
19	MF	(Sweden) SWE	Pontus Silfwer	16	0	13+2	0	0+1	0
20	DF	(Nigeria) NGA	Akeem Latifu	22	0	13+5	0	4	0
22	FW	(Sweden) SWE	Jacob Bergström	11	0	6+4	0	1	0
23	DF	(Norway) NOR	Sondre Johansen	34	8	29	5	4+1	3
27	FW	(Norway) NOR	Frank Bamenye	2	0	0+2	0	0	0
30	MF	(Norway) NOR	Aristide Sagbakken	1	0	0+1	0	0	0
31	FW	(The Gambia) GAM	Jibril Bojang	17	1	1+12	0	3+1	1
33	MF	(Norway) NOR	Stian Aasmundsen	33	5	28+1	3	4	2
34	DF	(Norway) NOR	Per Steiring	2	0	1+1	0	0	0
Players away from Mjøndalen on loan:
14	MF	(Ivory Coast) CIV	Vamouti Diomande	3	0	0+2	0	1	0
16	MF	(Iceland) ISL	Dagur Þórhallsson	5	0	0+1	0	2+2	0
21	FW	(Norway) NOR	Alfred Scriven	12	2	0+9	2	0+3	0
26	FW	(Norway) NOR	Adrian Hansen	1	0	0	0	0+1	0
Players who left Mjøndalen during the season
32	GK	(Norway) NOR	Mathias Ranmark	7	0	5	0	2	0

=== Goal scorers ===
Place	Position	Nation	Number	Name	Eliteserien	Norwegian Cup	Total
1	MF	(Denmark)	7	Tonny Brochmann	8	0	8
1	DF	(Norway)	23	Sondre Johansen	5	3	8
3	FW	(Canada)	10	Olivier Occéan	6	1	7
4	MF	(Norway)	11	Christian Gauseth	5	0	5
4	MF	(Norway)	33	Stian Aasmundsen	3	2	5
4	FW	(Norway)	8	Fredrik Brustad	2	3	5
7	FW	(Norway)	9	Sondre Liseth	3	1	4
8	DF	(Norway)	3	Vetle Dragsnes	2	0	2
8	FW	(Norway)	21	Alfred Scriven	2	0	2
10	DF	(Netherlands)	2	Quint Jansen	1	0	1
10	DF	(Norway)	4	William Sell	1	0	1
10	FW	(The Gambia)	31	Jibril Bojang	0	1	1
				TOTALS	38	11	49

=== Clean sheets ===
Place	Position	Nation	Number	Name	Eliteserien	Norwegian Cup	Total
1	GK	(Norway)	12	Julian Lund	8	2	10
2	GK	(Norway)	32	Mathias Ranmark	0	1	1
				TOTALS	8	3	11

=== Disciplinary record ===
Number	Nation	Position	Name	Eliteserien		Norwegian Cup		Total	
Number	Nation	Position	Name	Booked	Sent off (straight red)	Booked	Sent off (straight red)	Booked	Sent off (straight red)
2	(Netherlands)	DF	Quint Jansen	3	0	1	0	4	0
3	(Norway)	DF	Vetle Dragsnes	2	0	0	0	2	0
4	(Norway)	DF	William Sell	1	0	0	0	1	0
5	(Norway)	DF	Alexander Hansen	1	0	0	0	1	0
6	(Norway)	DF	Joackim Solberg	7	1	2	0	9	1
7	(Denmark)	MF	Tonny Brochmann	5	0	0	0	5	0
8	(Norway)	FW	Fredrik Brustad	2	0	0	0	2	0
9	(Norway)	FW	Sondre Liseth	4	0	0	0	4	0
10	(Canada)	FW	Olivier Occéan	1	0	0	0	1	0
11	(Norway)	MF	Christian Gauseth	2	0	1	0	3	0
12	(Norway)	GK	Julian Lund	1	0	0	0	1	0
19	(Sweden)	MF	Pontus Silfwer	2	0	0	0	2	0
22	(Sweden)	FW	Jacob Bergström	0	0	1	0	1	0
23	(Norway)	DF	Sondre Johansen	5	0	0	0	5	0
31	(The Gambia)	FW	Jibril Bojang	1	0	0	0	1	0
33	(Norway)	MF	Stian Aasmundsen	5	0	1	0	6	0
Players away from Mjøndalen on loan:
21	(Norway)	FW	Alfred Scriven	1	0	0	0	1	0
Players who left Mjøndalen during the season:
			TOTALS	43	1	6	0	49	1
