= List of Norwegian football transfers summer 2019 =

This is a list of Norwegian football transfers in the 2019 summer transfer window by club. Only clubs of the 2019 Eliteserien and 2019 1.divisjon are included.

== Eliteserien ==
=== Bodø/Glimt ===
In: Note: Flags indicate national team as defined under FIFA eligibility rules; some limited exceptions apply. Players may hold more than one non-FIFA nationality.

No.	Pos.	Nation	Player
22	MF	NOR	Ole Amund Sveen (from (Norway) Sogndal)

Out: Note: Flags indicate national team as defined under FIFA eligibility rules; some limited exceptions apply. Players may hold more than one non-FIFA nationality.

No.	Pos.	Nation	Player
10	MF	ESP	José Ángel (to (Spain) Cartagena, previously on loan to (Moldova) Sheriff Tiraspol)
20	FW	SWE	Amor Layouni (to (Egypt) Pyramids)
21	FW	NOR	Geir André Herrem (to (Sweden) Kalmar)
22	MF	NOR	Felix Myhre (loan return to (Norway) Vålerenga)
32	MF	NOR	Casper Øyvann (on loan to (Norway) Mjølner)
—	FW	NOR	Adrian Skindlo (on loan to (Norway) Mjølner, previously on loan to (Iceland) Afturelding)
—	FW	NOR	William Arne Hanssen (on loan to (Norway) Mjølner, then made permanent)

=== Brann ===
In: Note: Flags indicate national team as defined under FIFA eligibility rules; some limited exceptions apply. Players may hold more than one non-FIFA nationality.

No.	Pos.	Nation	Player
34	MF	NOR	Marius Bildøy (loan return from (Norway) Åsane)
39	FW	NOR	Aune Heggebø (loan return from (Norway) Nest-Sotra)
—	GK	NOR	Markus Olsen Pettersen (loan return from (Norway) Nest-Sotra)
—	FW	NOR	Erlend Hustad (from (Norway) Notodden)

Out: Note: Flags indicate national team as defined under FIFA eligibility rules; some limited exceptions apply. Players may hold more than one non-FIFA nationality.

No.	Pos.	Nation	Player
6	DF	SWE	Jesper Löfgren (on loan to (Sweden) Mjällby)
14	MF	NED	Ludcinio Marengo (released)
23	MF	NOR	Kristoffer Løkberg (to (Norway) Viking)
24	GK	NOR	Emil Harloff (on loan to (Norway) Nest-Sotra)
27	FW	NOR	Henrik Kjelsrud Johansen (to (Norway) Fredrikstad)
39	FW	NOR	Aune Heggebø (on loan to (Norway) Nest-Sotra)
—	FW	NOR	Erlend Hustad (on loan to (Norway) Nest-Sotra)

=== Haugesund ===
In: Note: Flags indicate national team as defined under FIFA eligibility rules; some limited exceptions apply. Players may hold more than one non-FIFA nationality.

No.	Pos.	Nation	Player
—	DF	NOR	Stian Ringstad (from (Norway) Strømsgodset)
18	DF	DEN	Pascal Gregor (on loan from (Denmark) Helsingør)
21	FW	NGA	Shuaibu Ibrahim (loan return from (Israel) Bnei Sakhnin)
82	GK	DEN	Oskar Snorre (on loan from (Denmark) Lyngby)

Out: Note: Flags indicate national team as defined under FIFA eligibility rules; some limited exceptions apply. Players may hold more than one non-FIFA nationality.

No.	Pos.	Nation	Player
21	FW	NGA	Shuaibu Ibrahim (on loan to (Norway) Kongsvinger)
35	MF	NGA	Anthony Ikedi (on loan from (Norway) Nest-Sotra)

=== Kristiansund ===
In: Note: Flags indicate national team as defined under FIFA eligibility rules; some limited exceptions apply. Players may hold more than one non-FIFA nationality.

No.	Pos.	Nation	Player
8	MF	NOR	Olav Øby (from (Norway) KFUM)
9	FW	NOR	Amahl Pellegrino (from (Norway) Strømsgodset)
37	FW	NOR	Oskar Sivertsen (promoted from junior squad)

Out: Note: Flags indicate national team as defined under FIFA eligibility rules; some limited exceptions apply. Players may hold more than one non-FIFA nationality.

No.	Pos.	Nation	Player
8	MF	SWE	Haris Cirak (to (Sweden) GAIS)
12	GK	EST	Andreas Vaikla (to (Sweden) Norrköping)
17	FW	NOR	Kristoffer Hoven (to (Norway) Sogndal)
20	FW	CMR	Thomas Amang (loan return to (Norway) Molde)
27	MF	EST	Brent Lepistu (loan return to (Finland) FC Lahti)

=== Lillestrøm ===
In: Note: Flags indicate national team as defined under FIFA eligibility rules; some limited exceptions apply. Players may hold more than one non-FIFA nationality.

No.	Pos.	Nation	Player
6	DF	EST	Joonas Tamm (on loan from (Estonia) Flora Tallinn)
8	MF	NGA	Ifeanyi Mathew (loan return from (Turkey) Osmanlispor)

Out: Note: Flags indicate national team as defined under FIFA eligibility rules; some limited exceptions apply. Players may hold more than one non-FIFA nationality.

No.	Pos.	Nation	Player
12	MF	NGA	Raphael Ayagwa (released)
21	MF	MSR	Alex Dyer (loan return to (Sweden) Elfsborg)
24	DF	NOR	Erik Tobias Sandberg (on loan to (Norway) Skeid)
25	GK	EST	Matvei Igonen (on loan to (Estonia) Flora Tallinn)
—	MF	NGA	Charles Ezeh (on loan to (Norway) Skeid, previously on loan to (Norway) Hamkam)
—	MF	NOR	Petter Mathias Olsen (on loan to (Norway) Grorud, previously on loan to (Norway) Hamkam)

=== Mjøndalen ===
In: Note: Flags indicate national team as defined under FIFA eligibility rules; some limited exceptions apply. Players may hold more than one non-FIFA nationality.

No.	Pos.	Nation	Player
16	MF	ISL	Dagur Dan Thórhallsson (from (Iceland) Keflavik, previously on loan)
19	MF	SWE	Pontus Silfwer (from (Sweden) Halmstad)
22	FW	SWE	Jacob Bergström (from (Sweden) Mjällby)
24	DF	NOR	Erick Sagbakken (loan return from (Norway) Levanger)
27	FW	NOR	Frank Bamenye (promoted from junior squad)
30	MF	NOR	Aristide Sagbakken (promoted from junior squad)
32	GK	POR	Jorge Vieira (from (Norway) Ørn Horten)
34	DF	NOR	Per Magnus Steiring (on loan from (Norway) Sogndal)

Out: Note: Flags indicate national team as defined under FIFA eligibility rules; some limited exceptions apply. Players may hold more than one non-FIFA nationality.

No.	Pos.	Nation	Player
1	GK	IRN	Sosha Makani (released)
14	MF	CIV	Vamouti Diomande (on loan to (Norway) Ull-Kisa)
16	MF	ISL	Dagur Dan Thórhallsson (on loan to (Norway) Kvik Halden)
21	FW	NOR	Alfred Scriven (on loan to (Norway) Ull-Kisa)
24	DF	NOR	Erick Sagbakken (on loan to (Norway) Levanger)
32	GK	NOR	Mathias Eriksen Ranmark (loan return to (Norway) Molde)

=== Molde ===
In: Note: Flags indicate national team as defined under FIFA eligibility rules; some limited exceptions apply. Players may hold more than one non-FIFA nationality.

No.	Pos.	Nation	Player
15	MF	NOR	Tobias Christensen (from (Norway) Start)
20	MF	USA	Henry Wingo (from (United States) Seattle Sounders FC)
26	GK	NOR	Mathias Eriksen Ranmark (loan return from (Norway) Mjøndalen)

Out: Note: Flags indicate national team as defined under FIFA eligibility rules; some limited exceptions apply. Players may hold more than one non-FIFA nationality.

No.	Pos.	Nation	Player
3	DF	SWE	Christopher Telo (to (Sweden) IFK Norrköping)
20	FW	CMR	Thomas Amang (to (Spain) Gimnàstic, previously on loan to (Norway) Kristiansund)
21	MF	NOR	Tobias Svendsen (on loan to (Norway) Nest-Sotra, previously on loan to (Norway) Sandefjord)
22	DF	DEN	Christoffer Remmer (to (Belgium) Westerlo)
45	MF	NOR	Emil Breivik (on loan to (Norway) Raufoss)
46	MF	NOR	Tobias Hestad (on loan to (Norway) Asker)

=== Odd ===
In: Note: Flags indicate national team as defined under FIFA eligibility rules; some limited exceptions apply. Players may hold more than one non-FIFA nationality.

No.	Pos.	Nation	Player
10	MF	NOR	Moussa Njie (on loan from (Serbia) Partizan Belgrade)
13	DF	NOR	Kevin Egell-Johnsen (promoted from junior squad)

Out: Note: Flags indicate national team as defined under FIFA eligibility rules; some limited exceptions apply. Players may hold more than one non-FIFA nationality.

No.	Pos.	Nation	Player
10	FW	NOR	Sander Svendsen (loan return to (Sweden) Hammarby)
—	FW	NOR	Andreas Helmersen (loan return to (Norway) Rosenborg)

=== Ranheim ===
In: Note: Flags indicate national team as defined under FIFA eligibility rules; some limited exceptions apply. Players may hold more than one non-FIFA nationality.

No.	Pos.	Nation	Player
14	MF	NOR	Vegard Erlien (from (Norway) Sandnes Ulf)
25	FW	NOR	Mushaga Bakenga (on loan from (Norway) Tromsø)

Out: Note: Flags indicate national team as defined under FIFA eligibility rules; some limited exceptions apply. Players may hold more than one non-FIFA nationality.

No.	Pos.	Nation	Player
8	DF	NOR	Magnus Stamnestrø (on loan to (Faroe Islands) Klaksvik)
17	MF	NOR	Sondre Sørløkk (on loan to (Norway) Stjørdals-Blink)
19	DF	NOR	Glenn Walker (on loan to (Norway) Hødd)
25	MF	NOR	Marius Augdal (to (Norway) Stjørdals-Blink)

=== Rosenborg ===
In: Note: Flags indicate national team as defined under FIFA eligibility rules; some limited exceptions apply. Players may hold more than one non-FIFA nationality.

No.	Pos.	Nation	Player
20	MF	NOR	Edvard Tagseth (Free agent)
23	FW	NOR	Bjørn Maars Johnsen (on loan from (Netherlands) AZ)
—	FW	NOR	Andreas Helmersen (loan return from (Norway) Odd)

Out: Note: Flags indicate national team as defined under FIFA eligibility rules; some limited exceptions apply. Players may hold more than one non-FIFA nationality.

No.	Pos.	Nation	Player
9	FW	DEN	Nicklas Bendtner (to (Denmark) FC København)
26	DF	BIH	Besim Šerbečić (on loan to (Bosnia and Herzegovina) Sarajevo)
30	DF	NGA	Igoh Ogbu (on loan to (Norway) Sogndal)

=== Sarpsborg 08 ===
In: Note: Flags indicate national team as defined under FIFA eligibility rules; some limited exceptions apply. Players may hold more than one non-FIFA nationality.

No.	Pos.	Nation	Player
2	DF	NED	Bart Straalman (from (Netherlands) De Graafschap)
5	DF	NOR	Niklas Gunnarsson (from (Italy) Palermo)
13	DF	AUT	Mario Pavelić (on loan from (Croatia) Rijeka)
20	DF	NOR	Magnar Ødegaard (from (Sweden) AIK)
21	FW	NOR	Mostafa Abdellaoue (from (Norway) Strømsgodset)
23	MF	GLP	Lenny Nangis (from (Greece) Levadiakos)
30	GK	FRA	Alexandre Letellier (on loan from (France) Angers)
44	MF	CRO	Mate Maleš (from (Romania) Cluj)
48	FW	NIR	Kyle Lafferty (from (Scotland) Rangers)

Out: Note: Flags indicate national team as defined under FIFA eligibility rules; some limited exceptions apply. Players may hold more than one non-FIFA nationality.

No.	Pos.	Nation	Player
1	GK	NOR	Sander Thulin (on loan to (Norway) Kråkerøy)
5	DF	CRC	Pablo Arboine (on loan to (Denmark) Køge)
14	MF	CRC	Wílmer Azofeifa (on loan to (Norway) Aalesund)
18	MF	NOR	Sebastian Jarl (on loan to (Norway) KFUM)
24	MF	NOR	Anwar Elyounoussi (on loan to (Norway) Fram Larvik)
27	FW	MLI	Boubacar Konté (on loan to (Denmark) Nordsjælland)
44	DF	TRI	Sheldon Bateau (to (Belgium) Mechelen)
78	GK	RUS	Aleksandr Vasyutin (to (Russia) Zenit St. Petersburg)
88	FW	NOR	Lars-Jørgen Salvesen (to (Norway) Strømsgodset)

=== Stabæk ===
In: Note: Flags indicate national team as defined under FIFA eligibility rules; some limited exceptions apply. Players may hold more than one non-FIFA nationality.

No.	Pos.	Nation	Player
3	DF	NOR	Yaw Amankwah (from (Denmark) Hobro)
10	MF	DEN	Youssef Toutouh (on loan from (Denmark) AGF)
19	FW	JPN	Kosuke Kinoshita (from (Belgium) Sint-Truiden)
21	FW	DEN	Kasper Junker (on loan from (Denmark) Horsens)
22	MF	DEN	Sammy Skytte (on loan from (Denmark) Midtjylland)
23	FW	NOR	Oliver Valaker Edvardsen (from (Norway) Grorud)
67	MF	BEL	Tortol Lumanza (from (Turkey) Osmanlıspor)

Out: Note: Flags indicate national team as defined under FIFA eligibility rules; some limited exceptions apply. Players may hold more than one non-FIFA nationality.

No.	Pos.	Nation	Player
3	DF	DEN	Nikolaj Kirk (loan return to (Denmark) Midtjylland)
10	FW	NOR	Franck Boli (to (Hungary) Ferencváros)
21	DF	EST	Madis Vihmann (loan return to (Estonia) Flora)
22	FW	HUN	Alexander Torvund (demoted to B team)
28	DF	CHN	Sun Jie (loan return to (China) Changchun Yatai)
29	FW	NOR	Oscar Aga (on loan to (Norway) Grorud)
42	MF	NOR	Tobias Børkeeiet (to (Denmark) Brøndby)
77	MF	MAR	Youness Mokhtar (released)

=== Strømsgodset ===
In: Note: Flags indicate national team as defined under FIFA eligibility rules; some limited exceptions apply. Players may hold more than one non-FIFA nationality.

No.	Pos.	Nation	Player
4	DF	CMR	Duplexe Tchamba (on loan from (France) Strasbourg)
10	FW	NOR	Moses Mawa (from (Norway) KFUM)
17	MF	NOR	Tobias Fjeld Gulliksen (promoted from junior squad)
21	DF	DEN	Mikkel Maigaard (from (Norway) Raufoss)
22	MF	FRA	Prosper Mendy (from (Spain) Badajoz)
35	GK	DEN	Martin Hansen (from (Switzerland) Basel)
42	MF	NGA	Jack Ipalibo (on loan from (Spain) Villarreal C)
56	MF	NOR	Mustapha Fofana (promoted from junior squad)
88	FW	NOR	Lars Jørgen Salvesen (from (Norway) Sarpsborg 08)

Out: Note: Flags indicate national team as defined under FIFA eligibility rules; some limited exceptions apply. Players may hold more than one non-FIFA nationality.

No.	Pos.	Nation	Player
9	FW	NOR	Sebastian Pedersen (on loan to (Norway) Florø)
10	FW	NOR	Marcus Pedersen (released)
19	FW	NOR	Halldor Stenevik (on loan to (Norway) Sogndal)
25	DF	NOR	Stian Ringstad (to (Norway) Haugesund)
29	MF	MLI	Yacouba Sylla (to (Romania) CFR Cluj)
30	FW	NOR	Mostafa Abdellaoue (to (Norway) Sarpsborg 08)
40	GK	NOR	Morten Sætra (on loan to (Norway) Strømmen)
66	MF	NOR	Andreas Hoven (to (Norway) Sogndal, previously on loan to Nest-Sotra)
80	DF	NOR	Andreas Nyhagen (on loan to (Norway) Grorud)
90	FW	NOR	Amahl Pellegrino (to (Norway) Kristiansund)

=== Tromsø ===
In: Note: Flags indicate national team as defined under FIFA eligibility rules; some limited exceptions apply. Players may hold more than one non-FIFA nationality.

No.	Pos.	Nation	Player
20	MF	ENG	Aidan Barlow (on loan from (England) Manchester United U23)
23	MF	SWE	Eric Smith (on loan from (Belgium) Gent)
34	MF	NOR	Tomas Stabell (promoted from junior squad)
77	FW	NOR	Fitim Azemi (on loan from (Norway) Vålerenga)

Out: Note: Flags indicate national team as defined under FIFA eligibility rules; some limited exceptions apply. Players may hold more than one non-FIFA nationality.

No.	Pos.	Nation	Player
42	FW	NOR	Mushaga Bakenga (on loan to (Norway) Ranheim)

=== Viking ===
In: Note: Flags indicate national team as defined under FIFA eligibility rules; some limited exceptions apply. Players may hold more than one non-FIFA nationality.

No.	Pos.	Nation	Player
12	GK	NOR	Erik Arnebrott (loan return from (Norway) Tromsdalen)
21	MF	NOR	Harald Nilsen Tangen (loan return from (Norway) Tromsdalen)
24	MF	NOR	Kristoffer Løkberg (from (Norway) Brann)
29	FW	FIN	Benjamin Källman (on loan from (Finland) Inter Turku)

Out: Note: Flags indicate national team as defined under FIFA eligibility rules; some limited exceptions apply. Players may hold more than one non-FIFA nationality.

No.	Pos.	Nation	Player
12	GK	NOR	Erik Arnebrott (on loan to (Norway) Tromsdalen)
21	MF	NOR	Harald Nilsen Tangen (on loan to (Norway) Tromsdalen)
22	MF	NOR	Lasse Berg Johnsen (on loan to (Norway) Tromsdalen)

=== Vålerenga ===
In: Note: Flags indicate national team as defined under FIFA eligibility rules; some limited exceptions apply. Players may hold more than one non-FIFA nationality.

No.	Pos.	Nation	Player
1	GK	NOR	Kjetil Haug (from (Norway) Sogndal, previously on loan)
9	FW	CRC	Mayron George (on loan from (Denmark) Midtjylland)
15	MF	NOR	Odin Thiago Holm (loan return from (Norway) Tiller)
18	DF	NOR	Christian Borchgrevink (loan return from (Norway) Notodden)
23	MF	NOR	Felix Myhre (loan return from (Norway) Bodø/Glimt)
27	DF	DEN	Pierre Kanstrup (from (Turkey) Erzurumspor)
28	MF	DEN	Ousmane Camara (from (Sweden) AFC Eskilstuna)
29	MF	NOR	Mohammed Fellah (free transfer)
33	DF	NOR	Amin Nouri (loan return from (Belgium) KV Oostende)

Out: Note: Flags indicate national team as defined under FIFA eligibility rules; some limited exceptions apply. Players may hold more than one non-FIFA nationality.

No.	Pos.	Nation	Player
9	FW	NOR	Fitim Azemi (on loan to (Norway) Tromsø)
17	MF	NOR	Leo Cornic (on loan to (Norway) Bærum)
19	FW	NGA	Peter Godly Michael (on loan to (Norway) Skeid)
20	MF	NOR	Sakarias Opsahl (on loan to (Norway) Ull/Kisa)
24	DF	NOR	Oskar Opsahl (on loan to (Norway) Skeid)
29	MF	NOR	Magnus Grødem (to (Denmark) Vejle, previously on loan to (Norway) Ull-Kisa)
40	FW	NGA	Chidera Ejuke (to (Netherlands) Heerenveen)

== Norwegian First Division ==
=== Aalesund ===
In: Note: Flags indicate national team as defined under FIFA eligibility rules; some limited exceptions apply. Players may hold more than one non-FIFA nationality.

No.	Pos.	Nation	Player
25	DF	NOR	Kristoffer Hay (loan return from (Norway) Tromsdalen)
26	GK	NOR	Marius Berntzen (from (Norway) Strømmen)
27	MF	CRC	Wílmer Azofeifa (on loan from (Norway) Sarpsborg 08)
30	MF	NGA	Izunna Uzochukwu (from (China) Meizhou Hakka)
36	FW	NOR	Vetle Fiskerstrand (promoted from junior squad)
38	MF	NOR	Isak Dybvik Määttä (promoted from junior squad)

Out: Note: Flags indicate national team as defined under FIFA eligibility rules; some limited exceptions apply. Players may hold more than one non-FIFA nationality.

No.	Pos.	Nation	Player

=== HamKam ===
In: Note: Flags indicate national team as defined under FIFA eligibility rules; some limited exceptions apply. Players may hold more than one non-FIFA nationality.

No.	Pos.	Nation	Player
1	GK	NOR	Lars Jendal (loan return from (Norway) Asker)
2	DF	NOR	Patrick Alfei Sæbø (loan return from (Norway) Brumunddal)
20	DF	NOR	Jo Nymo Matland (from (Norway) Brattvåg)
23	FW	NOR	Jarmund Øyen Kvernstuen (promoted from junior squad)
25	DF	NOR	Davod Arzani (promoted from junior squad)
99	MF	NGA	Abubakar Aliyu Ibrahim (loan return from (Norway) Notodden)

Out: Note: Flags indicate national team as defined under FIFA eligibility rules; some limited exceptions apply. Players may hold more than one non-FIFA nationality.

No.	Pos.	Nation	Player
1	GK	DEN	Marco Priis Jørgensen (to (Denmark) Roskilde)
2	DF	NOR	Patrick Alfei Sæbø (on loan to (Norway) Brumunddal)
3	DF	NOR	Benjamin Gleditsch (retired)
15	DF	NOR	Lars Brotangen (to (Norway) Kjelsås)
19	MF	NGA	Charles Ezeh (loan return to (Norway) Lillestrøm)
20	MF	NOR	Petter Mathias Olsen (loan return to (Norway) Lillestrøm)

=== Jerv ===
In: Note: Flags indicate national team as defined under FIFA eligibility rules; some limited exceptions apply. Players may hold more than one non-FIFA nationality.

No.	Pos.	Nation	Player
3	DF	NOR	Bjørnar Hove (from (Norway) Stjørdals-Blink)
18	MF	NOR	Jørgen Solli (from (Norway) Nardo)
22	FW	NOR	Alexander Dang (from (Norway) Nest-Sotra)
31	MF	NOR	Daniel Roppestad (from (Norway) FK Tønsberg)
97	FW	FRA	David Faupala (from (Cyprus) Apollon Limassol)
98	MF	GHA	Michael Baidoo (on loan from (Denmark) Midtjylland)

Out: Note: Flags indicate national team as defined under FIFA eligibility rules; some limited exceptions apply. Players may hold more than one non-FIFA nationality.

No.	Pos.	Nation	Player
15	DF	NOR	Halvor Hovstad (to (United States) Seattle Redhawks)
18	MF	NOR	Petter Ølberg (to (Norway) NTNUI)
19	DF	NOR	Kristoffer Tønnessen (to (Norway) Start)
22	FW	NOR	Markus Brændsrød (loan return to (Norway) Sogndal)
25	MF	NGA	Michael Ogungbaro (loan return to (Norway) Start)
27	FW	NOR	Chuma Anene (loan return to (Denmark) Midtjylland)

=== KFUM Oslo ===
In: Note: Flags indicate national team as defined under FIFA eligibility rules; some limited exceptions apply. Players may hold more than one non-FIFA nationality.

No.	Pos.	Nation	Player
4	MF	NOR	Sebastian Jarl (on loan from (Norway) Sarpsborg 08)
11	FW	NOR	David Tavakoli (from (Norway) Skeid)
—		NOR	Erik Stafford Germundsson (from (Norway) Skjetten)

Out: Note: Flags indicate national team as defined under FIFA eligibility rules; some limited exceptions apply. Players may hold more than one non-FIFA nationality.

No.	Pos.	Nation	Player
11	FW	NOR	Moses Mawa (to (Norway) Strømsgodset)
18	MF	NOR	Olav Øby (to (Norway) Kristiansund)
22	MF	NOR	Fredrik Levorstad (retired)

=== Kongsvinger ===
In: Note: Flags indicate national team as defined under FIFA eligibility rules; some limited exceptions apply. Players may hold more than one non-FIFA nationality.

No.	Pos.	Nation	Player
26	FW	NGA	Shuaibu Ibrahim (on loan from (Norway) Haugesund)

Out: Note: Flags indicate national team as defined under FIFA eligibility rules; some limited exceptions apply. Players may hold more than one non-FIFA nationality.

No.	Pos.	Nation	Player

=== Nest-Sotra ===
In: Note: Flags indicate national team as defined under FIFA eligibility rules; some limited exceptions apply. Players may hold more than one non-FIFA nationality.

No.	Pos.	Nation	Player
10	FW	NOR	Erlend Hustad (on loan from (Norway) Brann)
19	FW	NOR	Aune Heggebø (on loan from (Norway) Brann)
19	MF	NGA	Anthony Ikedi (on loan from (Norway) Haugesund)
20	MF	SWE	Mats Andreas Petersson (from (Norway) Levanger)
99	GK	NOR	Emil Harloff (on loan from (Norway) Brann)

Out: Note: Flags indicate national team as defined under FIFA eligibility rules; some limited exceptions apply. Players may hold more than one non-FIFA nationality.

No.	Pos.	Nation	Player
8	MF	NOR	Lars Christian Kjemhus (released)
9	FW	DEN	Lee Rochester Sørensen (to (Denmark) Roskilde)
10	FW	NOR	Alexander Dang (to (Norway) Jerv)
19	MF	NOR	Andreas Hoven (loan return to (Norway) Strømsgodset)
19	FW	NOR	Aune Heggebø (loan return to (Norway) Brann)
20	FW	NOR	Jefferson de Souza (to (Norway) Brodd)
27	MF	NOR	Senai Hagos (to (Norway) Åsane)
99	GK	NOR	Markus Olsen Pettersen (loan return to (Norway) Brann)

=== Notodden ===
In: Note: Flags indicate national team as defined under FIFA eligibility rules; some limited exceptions apply. Players may hold more than one non-FIFA nationality.

No.	Pos.	Nation	Player
20	MF	SLE	Alfred Sankoh (from (Oman) Majees)
24	FW	NOR	Magnus Langset (from (Norway) Molde 2)
30	GK	NOR	Bror Ness Grøtterud (from (Norway) Leknes)
33	FW	NGA	Marco Tagbajumi (from (Saudi Arabia) Najran)

Out: Note: Flags indicate national team as defined under FIFA eligibility rules; some limited exceptions apply. Players may hold more than one non-FIFA nationality.

No.	Pos.	Nation	Player
1	GK	SWE	Jonatan Johansson (released)
3	DF	NOR	Christian Borchgrevink (loan return to (Norway) Vålerenga)
20	MF	NGA	Abubakar Aliyu Ibrahim (loan return to (Norway) HamKam)
24	FW	NOR	Ebenezer Adu Koranteng (on loan to (Norway) Pors)
27	FW	NOR	Erlend Hustad (to (Norway) Brann)

=== Raufoss ===
In: Note: Flags indicate national team as defined under FIFA eligibility rules; some limited exceptions apply. Players may hold more than one non-FIFA nationality.

No.	Pos.	Nation	Player
11	MF	NOR	Nicolai Fosso Fremstad (from (United States) Kentucky Wildcats)
27	MF	NOR	Emil Breivik (on loan from (Norway) Molde)

Out: Note: Flags indicate national team as defined under FIFA eligibility rules; some limited exceptions apply. Players may hold more than one non-FIFA nationality.

No.	Pos.	Nation	Player
11	FW	DEN	Mikkel Maigaard (to (Norway) Strømsgodset)
13	DF	NOR	Henrik Fløgum (on loan to (Norway) Gjøvik-Lyn)
15	MF	NOR	Martin Heiberg (on loan to (Norway) Elverum)
21	FW	NOR	Thierry Dabove (on loan to (Norway) Grorud)

=== Sandefjord ===
In: Note: Flags indicate national team as defined under FIFA eligibility rules; some limited exceptions apply. Players may hold more than one non-FIFA nationality.

No.	Pos.	Nation	Player
42	MF	NOR	Jakob Maslø Dunsby (loan return from HIFK)

Out: Note: Flags indicate national team as defined under FIFA eligibility rules; some limited exceptions apply. Players may hold more than one non-FIFA nationality.

No.	Pos.	Nation	Player
4	DF	NOR	Christer Reppesgård Hansen (to (Norway) Sandnes Ulf)
11	MF	NOR	Tobias Svendsen (loan return to (Norway) Molde)
16	MF	NOR	Sander Risan Mørk (on loan to (Norway) Fram Larvik)
22	MF	NOR	Mohammed Fellah (released)

=== Sandnes Ulf ===
In: Note: Flags indicate national team as defined under FIFA eligibility rules; some limited exceptions apply. Players may hold more than one non-FIFA nationality.

No.	Pos.	Nation	Player
2	DF	NOR	Chris André Formo (promoted from junior squad)
11	MF	NGA	Maxwell Effiom (from (Nigeria) Enyimba Aba)
27	DF	NOR	Christer Reppesgård Hansen (from (Norway) Sandefjord)
32	DF	DEN	Claes Kronberg (free transfer)
36	GK	NOR	Markus Vassøy Nilsen (promoted from junior squad)

Out: Note: Flags indicate national team as defined under FIFA eligibility rules; some limited exceptions apply. Players may hold more than one non-FIFA nationality.

No.	Pos.	Nation	Player
15	MF	NOR	Vegard Erlien (to (Norway) Ranheim)
21	MF	NOR	Herman Kleppa (on loan to (Norway) Egersund)

=== Skeid ===
In: Note: Flags indicate national team as defined under FIFA eligibility rules; some limited exceptions apply. Players may hold more than one non-FIFA nationality.

No.	Pos.	Nation	Player
9	FW	NGA	Peter Godly Michael (on loan from (Norway) Vålerenga)
15	FW	NOR	Simen Hestnes (from (United States) Long Island Blackbirds)
14	DF	NOR	Erik Tobias Sandberg (on loan from (Norway) Lillestrøm)
27	MF	NGA	Charles Ezeh (on loan from (Norway) Lillestrøm)
—	DF	NOR	Oskar Opsahl (on loan from (Norway) Vålerenga)

Out: Note: Flags indicate national team as defined under FIFA eligibility rules; some limited exceptions apply. Players may hold more than one non-FIFA nationality.

No.	Pos.	Nation	Player
9	FW	NOR	David Tavakoli (to (Norway) KFUM)
15	MF	NOR	Sander Flåte (retired)
23	MF	NOR	Mathias Dahl Abelsen (on loan to (Norway) Mjølner)
26	FW	NOR	Theodor Kramarics (on loan to (Norway) Eidsvold Turn)

=== Sogndal ===
In: Note: Flags indicate national team as defined under FIFA eligibility rules; some limited exceptions apply. Players may hold more than one non-FIFA nationality.

No.	Pos.	Nation	Player
8	MF	NOR	Tomas Kristoffersen (from (Norway) Tromsdalen)
11	MF	NOR	Andreas Hoven (from (Norway) Strømsgodset)
18	FW	NOR	Kristoffer Hoven (from (Norway) Kristiansund)
19	FW	NOR	Halldor Stenevik (on loan from (Norway) Strømsgodset)
20	FW	NOR	Markus Brændsrød (loan return from (Norway) Jerv)
30	DF	NGA	Igoh Ogbu (on loan from (Norway) Rosenborg)
34	MF	NOR	Anders J. Nord (promoted from junior squad)
35	DF	NOR	Eirik Lereng (promoted from junior squad)

Out: Note: Flags indicate national team as defined under FIFA eligibility rules; some limited exceptions apply. Players may hold more than one non-FIFA nationality.

No.	Pos.	Nation	Player
3	DF	NOR	Per Magnus Steiring (on loan to (Norway) Mjøndalen)
8	MF	NOR	Eirik Birkelund (retired)
11	FW	NOR	Martin Ramsland (to (Norway) Start)
18	FW	NOR	Sigurd Haugen (to (Belgium) Saint-Gilloise)
19	MF	NOR	Ole Amund Sveen (to (Norway) Bodø/Glimt)
21	GK	NOR	Kristian Bergheim Rutlin (to (Norway) Fjøra)

=== Start ===
In: Note: Flags indicate national team as defined under FIFA eligibility rules; some limited exceptions apply. Players may hold more than one non-FIFA nationality.

No.	Pos.	Nation	Player
7	MF	SWE	Kevin Kabran (loan return from (Sweden) Elfsborg)
8	FW	NOR	Eman Markovic (from (Bosnia and Herzegovina) Zrinjski Mostar)
9	FW	NOR	Martin Ramsland (from (Norway) Sogndal)
22	DF	NOR	Kristoffer Tønnessen (from (Norway) Jerv)
—	FW	NOR	Kristian Strømland Lien (promoted from junior squad)

Out: Note: Flags indicate national team as defined under FIFA eligibility rules; some limited exceptions apply. Players may hold more than one non-FIFA nationality.

No.	Pos.	Nation	Player
10	MF	NOR	Tobias Christensen (to (Norway) Molde)
22	FW	ISL	Kristján Flóki Finnbogason (to (Iceland) KR Reykjavík)
24	MF	ISL	Guðmundur Andri Tryggvason (on loan to (Iceland) Vikingur)
25	MF	NGA	Michael Ogungbaro (to (Slovenia) Bravo, previously on loan to (Norway) Jerv)

=== Strømmen ===
In: Note: Flags indicate national team as defined under FIFA eligibility rules; some limited exceptions apply. Players may hold more than one non-FIFA nationality.

No.	Pos.	Nation	Player
19	FW	NOR	Kjell Rune Sellin (from (Norway) Fredrikstad)
22	DF	NOR	Benjamin Sundo (promoted from junior squad)
25	FW	NOR	Lasse Bransdal (from (Norway) Oppsal)
97	GK	NOR	Morten Sætra (on loan from (Norway) Strømsgodset)
—	FW	NOR	Bessijan Kastrati (from (Norway) Ullern)

Out: Note: Flags indicate national team as defined under FIFA eligibility rules; some limited exceptions apply. Players may hold more than one non-FIFA nationality.

No.	Pos.	Nation	Player
22	DF	NOR	Simen Melby (to (Norway) Sørumsand)
30	GK	NOR	Marius Berntzen (to (Norway) Aalesund)
40	FW	NOR	Felix Leenborg Anthonessen (released)

=== Tromsdalen ===
In: Note: Flags indicate national team as defined under FIFA eligibility rules; some limited exceptions apply. Players may hold more than one non-FIFA nationality.

No.	Pos.	Nation	Player
20		NOR	Ørjan Skallebø (from (Norway) Skjervøy)
22	MF	NOR	Lasse Berg Johnsen (on loan from (Norway) Viking)
23	MF	NOR	Harald Nilsen Tangen (on loan from (Norway) Viking)
24	GK	NOR	Erik Arnebrott (on loan from (Norway) Viking)
25	DF	NOR	Kristoffer Hay (on loan from (Norway) Aalesund)

Out: Note: Flags indicate national team as defined under FIFA eligibility rules; some limited exceptions apply. Players may hold more than one non-FIFA nationality.

No.	Pos.	Nation	Player
9	MF	NOR	Tomas Kristoffersen (to (Norway) Sogndal)
23	MF	NOR	Harald Nilsen Tangen (loan return to (Norway) Viking)
24	GK	NOR	Erik Arnebrott (loan return to (Norway) Viking)
25	DF	NOR	Kristoffer Hay (loan return to (Norway) Aalesund)
—	FW	NOR	George Lewis (to (Norway) Fram Larvik)

=== Ull/Kisa ===
In: Note: Flags indicate national team as defined under FIFA eligibility rules; some limited exceptions apply. Players may hold more than one non-FIFA nationality.

No.	Pos.	Nation	Player
7	FW	NOR	Alfred Scriven (on loan from (Norway) Mjøndalen)
22	MF	CIV	Vamouti Diomande (on loan from (Norway) Mjøndalen)
27	MF	NOR	Sakarias Opsahl (on loan from (Norway) Vålerenga)

Out: Note: Flags indicate national team as defined under FIFA eligibility rules; some limited exceptions apply. Players may hold more than one non-FIFA nationality.

No.	Pos.	Nation	Player
7	MF	NOR	Magnus Grødem (loan return to (Norway) Vålerenga)
18	MF	NOR	Herman Henriksen (on loan to (Norway) Eidsvoll Turn)
