= List of Norwegian football transfers winter 2016–17 =

This is a list of Norwegian football transfers in the 2016–17 winter transfer window by club. Only clubs of the 2017 Tippeligaen and 2017 Norwegian First Division is included.

== Eliteserien ==
=== Brann ===
In:

No.	Pos.	Nation	Player
3	DF	NED	Vito Wormgoor (from (Norway) Aalesund)
6	DF	ISL	Viðar Ari Jónsson (from (Iceland) Fjölnir)
7	MF	NOR	Peter Orry Larsen (free agent)
22	FW	NOR	Torgeir Børven (from (Netherlands) Twente, previously on loan)

Out:

No.	Pos.	Nation	Player
6	DF	NOR	Vadim Demidov (released)
14	MF	NOR	Fredrik Heggland (to (Norway) Åsane, previously on loan at (Norway) Fana)
16	MF	NOR	Remi Johansen (to (Norway) Sandnes Ulf)
23	FW	NOR	Erik Huseklepp (to (Norway) Haugesund)
26	DF	FIN	Dani Hatakka (on loan to (Finland) SJK, previously on loan at (Norway) Hødd)
39	FW	NOR	Oliver Rotihaug (to (Norway) Florø, previously on loan)
—	DF	NOR	Fredrik Pallesen Knudsen (to (Norway) Haugesund, previously on loan at (Norway) Åsane)

=== Haugesund ===
In:

No.	Pos.	Nation	Player
4	DF	NOR	Fredrik Pallesen Knudsen (from (Norway) Brann, previously on loan at (Norway) Åsane)
9	MF	DEN	Frederik Gytkjær (from (Denmark) Lyngby)
10	FW	NOR	Erik Huseklepp (from (Norway) Brann)
16	MF	NOR	Bruno Leite (from (Norway) Skeid)
20	FW	NOR	Johnny Buduson (from (Norway) Skeid)
23	MF	BIH	Haris Hajradinović (from (Belgium) Gent, previously on loan)
—	DF	BRA	Bruno Gabriel Soares (from (Kazakhstan) Kairat)

Out:

No.	Pos.	Nation	Player
3	DF	SWE	David Myrestam (to (Sweden) GIF Sundsvall)
5	DF	NGA	William Troost-Ekong (loan return to (Belgium) Gent)
10	MF	NOR	Roy Miljeteig (released)
14	FW	NOR	Torbjørn Agdestein (to (Norway) Odd)
28	MF	NOR	Arent-Emil Hauge (on loan to (Norway) Vard Haugesund)
30	FW	NOR	Erling Myklebust (on loan to (Norway) Vard Haugesund)
55	DF	SRB	Nemanja Tubić (to (Serbia) Napredak Kruševac)
—	MF	GHA	Derrick Mensah (to (Slovenia) Aluminij, previously on loan at (Czech Republic) Karviná)

=== Kristiansund ===
In:

No.	Pos.	Nation	Player
1	GK	IRL	Sean McDermott (from (Norway) Ull/Kisa)
3	DF	NOR	Christoffer Aasbak (from (Norway) Hødd)
4	MF	NGA	Thompson Ekpe (on loan from (Norway) Molde)
13	GK	CRO	Ante Knezovic (from (Norway) Bryne)
20	FW	NOR	Benjamin Stokke (from (Norway) Levanger)
25	DF	NOR	Henrik Gjesdal (free agent)
27	DF	EST	Nikita Baranov (from (Estonia) Flora)

Out:

No.	Pos.	Nation	Player
1	GK	NOR	Alexander Hovdevik (released)
13	GK	SEN	Serigne Mor Mbaye (released)
14	DF	NOR	Espen Næss Lund (released)
—	DF	NOR	Victor Grodås (loan return to (Norway) Sogndal)
—	MF	NGA	Thompson Ekpe (loan return to (Norway) Molde)

=== Lillestrøm ===
In:

No.	Pos.	Nation	Player
1	GK	POR	Daniel Fernandes (free agent)
2	DF	NOR	Mats Haakenstad (from (Norway) Fram Larvik)
5	DF	NOR	Simen Rafn (from (Sweden) Gefle)
9	FW	NOR	Bajram Ajeti (from (Norway) Bryne)
14	MF	NOR	Fredrik Krogstad (loan return from (Norway) Ull/Kisa)
16	FW	NOR	Tobias Gran (from (Norway) Rosenborg 2)
22	DF	SRB	Stefan Antonijevic (from (United States) Tampa Bay Rowdies)
23	MF	BUL	Chigozie Udoji (from (China) Qingdao Jonoon)
27	FW	CZE	Michal Škoda (on loan from (Czech Republic) Zbrojovka Brno)
33	DF	NOR	Aleksander Melgalvis (from (Norway) Strømmen)

Out:

No.	Pos.	Nation	Player
1	GK	ISL	Haraldur Björnsson (to (Iceland) Stjarnan)
2	DF	SWE	Martin Falkeborn (on loan to (Sweden) Frej, previously on loan at (Norway) Ull/Kisa)
5	DF	NOR	Ole Martin Rindarøy (loan return to (Norway) Molde)
7	MF	LBN	Bassel Jradi (loan return to (Norway) Strømsgodset)
8	MF	FRA	Malaury Martin (released)
9	FW	ISL	Árni Vilhjálmsson (to (Sweden) Jönköpings Södra, previously on loan at (Iceland) Breiðablik)
12	GK	NOR	Jacob Faye-Lund (released)
14	MF	GHA	Francis Dickoh (released)
16	DF	NOR	Håkon Skogseid (released)
17	MF	NOR	Jørgen Kolstad (on loan to (Norway) Kongsvinger)
19	FW	ENG	Gary Martin (loan return to (Iceland) Víkingur)
20	MF	NOR	Mohamed Ofkir (to (Belgium) Lokeren)
27	MF	NOR	Markus Brændsrød (to (Norway) Strømmen, previously on loan)

=== Molde ===
In:

No.	Pos.	Nation	Player
3	DF	NOR	Ole Martin Rindarøy (loan return from (Norway) Lillestrøm)
13	MF	NGA	Thompson Ekpe (loan return from (Norway) Kristiansund)
15	DF	FRO	Sonni Nattestad (from (Iceland) FH)
16	MF	NOR	Etzaz Hussain (from (Croatia) Rudeš)
25	FW	ISL	Óttar Magnús Karlsson (from (Iceland) Víkingur)
30	FW	NOR	Erling Haaland (from (Norway) Bryne)

Out:

No.	Pos.	Nation	Player
1	GK	USA	Ethan Horvath (to (Belgium) Club Brugge)
2	FW	USA	Joshua Gatt (released)
7	MF	NOR	Harmeet Singh (to (Poland) Wisła Płock)
13	MF	NGA	Thompson Ekpe (on loan to (Norway) Kristiansund)
15	DF	NOR	Per Egil Flo (to (Czech Republic) Slavia Prague)
21	MF	BRA	Agnaldo (on loan to (Brazil) Vila Nova)
25	DF	NOR	Vegard Forren (released)
30	FW	SEN	Pape Paté Diouf (Released)
36	MF	NOR	Ola Ormset Husby (on loan to (Norway) Levanger)
—	MF	NOR	Thomas Kind Bendiksen (Released, later to Sandefjord)

=== Odd ===
In:

No.	Pos.	Nation	Player
7	MF	SWE	Martin Broberg (from (Sweden) Örebro)
9	FW	NOR	Torbjørn Agdestein (from (Norway) Haugesund)
27	FW	SEN	Pape Paté Diouf (free agent)

Out:

No.	Pos.	Nation	Player
17	MF	NOR	Eric Kitolano (released)
23	DF	NOR	Lars Kristian Eriksen (released)
26	MF	NGA	Bentley (released)
—	MF	NOR	Ole Jørgen Halvorsen (to (Norway) Sarpsborg 08, previously on loan at (Norway) Bodø/Glimt)

=== Rosenborg ===
In:

No.	Pos.	Nation	Player
2	DF	NOR	Vegar Eggen Hedenstad (from (Germany) FC St. Pauli)
3	DF	NOR	Birger Meling (from (Norway) Stabæk)
5	DF	DEN	Jacob Rasmussen (from (Germany) FC St. Pauli)
9	FW	DEN	Nicklas Bendtner (from (England) Nottingham Forest)
15	FW	KOS	Elbasan Rashani (from (Denmark) Brøndby, previously on loan)
17	MF	NOR	John Hou Sæter (loan return from (Norway) Ranheim)
24	GK	NOR	Arild Østbø (from (Norway) Sarpsborg 08)
25	MF	NOR	Marius Lundemo (free agent)
26	FW	SRB	Milan Jevtović (on loan from (Turkey) Antalyaspor)

Out:

No.	Pos.	Nation	Player
2	DF	NOR	Jonas Svensson (to (Netherlands) AZ)
5	DF	ISL	Hólmar Örn Eyjólfsson (to (Israel) Maccabi Haifa)
9	FW	DEN	Christian Gytkjær (to (Germany) TSV 1860 München)
12	GK	NOR	Alexander Lund Hansen (retired)
22	MF	NOR	Sivert Solli (on loan to (Norway) Elverum)
24	GK	GHA	Adam Larsen Kwarasey (to (Denmark) Brøndby)
28	MF	ISL	Guðmundur Þórarinsson (to (Sweden) IFK Norrköping)
30	GK	EST	Pavel Londak (Released)
31	DF	NOR	Per Magnus Steiring (to (Norway) Sogndal, previously on loan at (Norway) Viking)
33	GK	NOR	Julian Faye Lund (on loan to (Norway) Levanger)
—	FW	NOR	Tobias Gran (to (Norway) Lillestrøm)

=== Sandefjord ===
In:

No.	Pos.	Nation	Player
7	MF	NOR	Thomas Kind Bendiksen (from (Norway) Molde)
11	FW	KOS	Flamur Kastrati (from (Norway) Aalesund)
12	GK	NOR	Øystein Øvretveit (from (Norway) Nest-Sotra)
13	FW	NOR	Markus Naglestad (from (Norway) Fram Larvik)
14	DF	ENG	Elliot Kebbie (from (England) Barnsley)
16	DF	SEN	El-Hadji Gana Kane (from (Finland) SJK)
17	DF	NOR	Joackim Olsen Solberg (from (Norway) Mjøndalen)
20	DF	NOR	Kevin Jablinski (from (Norway) Fram Larvik)

Out:

No.	Pos.	Nation	Player
7	MF	NOR	Geir Ludvig Fevang (retired)
11	MF	NOR	Martin Torp (to (Norway) Ull/Kisa, previously on loan)
12	GK	NOR	Anders Gundersen (loan return to (Norway) Strømsgodset)
16	DF	NOR	Kjetil Berge (released)
19	FW	NOR	Kjell Rune Sellin (to (Norway) Sandnes Ulf)
20	MF	NOR	Varg Støvland (on loan to (Norway) Fram Larvik)
29	DF	NOR	Eirik Offenberg (retired)

=== Sarpsborg 08 ===
In:

No.	Pos.	Nation	Player
1	GK	SRB	Stefan Čupić (free agent)
2	DF	DEN	Andreas Albech (from (Iceland) Valur)
7	MF	NOR	Ole Jørgen Halvorsen (from (Norway) Odd)
11	MF	NOR	Joackim Jørgensen (free agent)
17	MF	NOR	Kristoffer Zachariassen (from (Norway) Nest-Sotra)
19	MF	SEN	Krépin Diatta (from (Senegal) Oslo Football Academy)
44	FW	KOS	Erton Fejzullahu (free agent)

Out:

No.	Pos.	Nation	Player
1	GK	NOR	Arild Østbø (to (Norway) Rosenborg)
2	FW	NOR	Brice Wembangomo (to (Norway) Jerv, previously on loan at (Norway) Fredrikstad)
7	FW	NOR	Pål Alexander Kirkevold (loan return to (Denmark) Hobro)
8	FW	NGA	Kachi (on loan to (Norway) Bodø/Glimt)
17	MF	DEN	Steffen Ernemann (to (Norway) Viking)
19	DF	ISL	Kristinn Jónsson (to (Norway) Sogndal)
24	FW	NOR	Amani Mbedule (on loan to (Norway) Hødd)

=== Sogndal ===
In:

No.	Pos.	Nation	Player
4	MF	NGA	Chidiebere Nwakali (on loan from (England) Manchester City)
5	DF	NOR	Victor Grodås (loan return from (Norway) Kristiansund)
7	MF	NOR	Eirik Schulze (from (Norway) Sandnes Ulf)
13	GK	NOR	Tarjei Aase Omenås (from (Norway) Strømmen)
15	DF	NOR	Per Magnus Steiring (from (Norway) Rosenborg, previously on loan at Viking)
18	FW	NOR	Bendik Bye (from (Norway) Levanger)
25	FW	DEN	Kasper Nissen (from (Norway) Nest-Sotra)
30	DF	ISL	Kristinn Jónsson (from (Norway) Sarpsborg 08)
34	MF	NOR	Simen Brekkhus (loan return from (Norway) Florø)

Out:

No.	Pos.	Nation	Player
4	DF	FIN	Hannu Patronen (to (Finland) HJK Helsinki)
7	MF	NOR	Rune Bolseth (retired)
15	DF	FIN	Jukka Raitala (to (United States) Columbus Crew)
16	DF	NOR	Vegard Leikvoll Moberg (to (Norway) Bodø/Glimt)
18	FW	GHA	Mahatma Otoo (released)
20	FW	NOR	Kristian Fardal Opseth (on loan to (Norway) Bodø/Glimt)
25	MF	NOR	Ruben Holsæter (to (Norway) Førde)
26	DF	DEN	Magnus Pedersen (on loan to (Norway) Elverum)
29	GK	NOR	Stefan Hagerup (to (Norway) Ull/Kisa)

=== Stabæk ===
In:

No.	Pos.	Nation	Player
4	MF	NOR	Tobias Ødegård (from (Norway) HamKam)
6	DF	NOR	Håkon Skogseid (free agent)
7	MF	GHA	Raymond Gyasi (from (Netherlands) Cambuur)
8	MF	FRA	El Hadji Ba (free agent)
9	FW	NOR	Sindre Mauritz-Hansen (from (Norway) Asker)
17	DF	NOR	Ahmed El Amrani (from (Sweden) Ljungskile)
20	FW	ENG	Alex Nimely (from (Romania) Viitorul Constanța)
67	MF	BEL	Tortol Lumanza (from (Belgium) Waasland-Beveren)
77	FW	CIV	Franck Boli (from (China) Liaoning Whowin, previously on loan at (Norway) Aalesund)
89	MF	DEN	Tonny Brochmann (from (Norway) Jerv)

Out:

No.	Pos.	Nation	Player
4	DF	SWE	Marcus Nilsson (released)
7	FW	CRC	Mynor Escoe (loan return to (Costa Rica) Saprissa)
8	MF	USA	Cole Grossman (released)
9	FW	GEO	Giorgi Gorozia (released)
10	FW	ALB	Agon Mehmeti (to (Turkey) Gençlerbirliği)
25	DF	NOR	Birger Meling (to (Norway) Rosenborg)
32	MF	BRA	Alanzinho (released)
60	DF	NOR	Edvard Linnebo Race (on loan to (Norway) Kongsvinger)
77	FW	NOR	Muhamed Keita (loan return to (Poland) Lech Poznan)
—	GK	NOR	Simen Lillevik (on loan to (Norway) Kongsvinger)

=== Strømsgodset ===
In:

No.	Pos.	Nation	Player
6	MF	NOR	Henning Hauger (from (Sweden) Elfsborg)
8	MF	LBN	Bassel Jradi (loan return from (Norway) Lillestrøm)
9	FW	SWE	Pontus Engblom (free agent)
12	GK	POL	Radosław Janukiewicz (on loan from (Poland) Pogoń Szczecin)
13	MF	SWE	Christian Rubio Sivodedov (from (Germany) Schalke 04 II)
25	DF	NOR	Stian Ringstad (from (Portugal) Braga)
33	FW	NGA	Marco Tagbajumi (from (Thailand) Nakhon Ratchasima)
77	GK	IRN	Sosha Makani (on loan from (Norway) Mjøndalen)

Out:

No.	Pos.	Nation	Player
8	MF	NOR	Petter Vaagan Moen (to (Norway) HamKam)
9	FW	NOR	Øyvind Storflor (to (Norway) Ranheim)
11	MF	NOR	Martin Rønning Ovenstad (to (Austria) Sturm Graz)
17	DF	NOR	Christopher Lindquist (on loan to (Norway) Florø)
18	DF	NOR	Henrik Bredeli (on loan to (Norway) Strømmen)
20	MF	GHA	Mohammed Abu (to (United States) Columbus Crew)
22	MF	GHA	Bismark Adjei-Boateng (loan return to (England) Manchester City)
30	GK	POL	Łukasz Jarosiński (to (Norway) HamKam)
40	GK	NOR	Morten Sætra (on loan to (Norway) Nybergsund)
46	DF	NOR	Sondre Solholm Johansen (on loan to (Norway) Mjøndalen)
54	MF	NOR	Knut Ahlander (on loan to (Norway) Asker)
—	GK	NOR	Anders Gundersen (to (Norway) Arendal, previously on loan at (Norway) Sandefjord)
—	GK	NOR	Borger Thomas (to (Norway) Åsane, previously on loan at (Norway) Nybergsund)

=== Tromsø ===
In:

No.	Pos.	Nation	Player
4	DF	SEN	Mehdi Dioury (from (Senegal) Diambars)
9	FW	SVN	Slobodan Vuk (from (Slovenia) Domžale)
16	DF	GHA	Patrick Kpozo (on loan from (Sweden) AIK)
18	MF	SEN	El Hadji Samb (from (Senegal) Diambars)

Out:

No.	Pos.	Nation	Player
4	DF	NOR	Henrik Gjesdal (released)
9	FW	TUN	Sofien Moussa (released)
20	FW	NOR	Christer Johnsgård (released)
25	DF	NOR	Lasse Nilsen (on loan to (Norway) Tromsdalen)

=== Viking ===
In:

No.	Pos.	Nation	Player
4	DF	ENG	Michael Ledger (on loan from (England) Sunderland)
10	FW	GHA	Kwesi Appiah (on loan from (England) Crystal Palace)
17	MF	DEN	Steffen Ernemann (from (Norway) Sarpsborg 08)
23	FW	NIR	Robin Shroot (on loan from (Norway) Hødd)
41	DF	NOR	Kristian Novak (from (Norway) Ålgård)

Out:

No.	Pos.	Nation	Player
4	MF	NOR	Joackim Jørgensen (released)
8	MF	ENG	Chris Dawson (loan return to (England) Rotherham United)
8	FW	NGA	Aniekpeno Udoh (on loan to (Norway) Levanger)
16	MF	NOR	Abdisalam Ibrahim (to (Norway) Vålerenga)
23	MF	ISL	Steinþór Freyr Þorsteinsson (to (Iceland) KA, previously on loan at (Norway) Sandnes Ulf)
24	GK	NOR	Pål Vestly Heigre (to (Norway) Aalesund)
26	DF	NOR	Erik Steen (on loan to (Norway) Vidar)
29	FW	NOR	Martin Hummervoll (released)
—	DF	NOR	Per Magnus Steiring (loan return to (Norway) Rosenborg)

=== Vålerenga ===
In:

No.	Pos.	Nation	Player
6	MF	NOR	Abdisalam Ibrahim (from (Norway) Viking)
11	FW	NOR	Bård Finne (from (Germany) 1. FC Heidenheim)
15	MF	NOR	Daniel Berntsen (from (Sweden) Djurgården)
17	MF	NOR	Muhamed Keita (on loan from (Poland) Lech Poznan)
22	DF	NOR	Ivan Näsberg (loan return from (Sweden) Varbergs BoIS)

Out:

No.	Pos.	Nation	Player
6	DF	NOR	Simon Larsen (to (Norway) Start)
16	MF	NOR	Vajebah Sakor (loan return to (Italy) Juventus)
17	FW	NOR	Niklas Castro (to (Norway) Kongsvinger)
18	MF	NOR	Rino Falk Larsen (to (Norway) Fredrikstad)
22	FW	ISL	Elías Már Ómarsson (to (Sweden) Göteborg, previously on loan)
23	MF	NOR	Sander Berge (to (Belgium) Genk)
24	DF	NOR	Kjetil Wæhler (retired)
33	DF	NOR	Anders Nedrebø (released)
40	DF	NOR	Mats Andersen (to (Norway) Skeid)
42	DF	NOR	Henrik Tønsberg Andersen (to (Norway) Skeid)
—	FW	NOR	Riki Alba (to (Norway) Asker, previously on loan at (Norway) Ull/Kisa)

=== Aalesund ===
In:

No.	Pos.	Nation	Player
6	DF	NED	Kaj Ramsteijn (from (Netherlands) Almere City)
9	FW	SWE	Valmir Berisha (from (Netherlands) Cambuur)
10	FW	RSA	Lars Veldwijk (on loan from (Belgium) Kortrijk)
23	GK	NOR	Pål Vestly Heigre (from (Norway) Viking)

Out:

No.	Pos.	Nation	Player
6	DF	NED	Vito Wormgoor (to (Norway) Brann)
7	FW	CIV	Franck Boli (loan return to (China) Liaoning Whowin)
10	MF	NOR	Peter Orry Larsen (released)
19	FW	KOS	Flamur Kastrati (to (Norway) Sandefjord)
23	DF	NOR	Edvard Skagestad (to (Norway) Fredrikstad)
24	GK	NOR	Lars Cramer (retired)

== OBOS-ligaen ==
=== Arendal ===
In:

No.	Pos.	Nation	Player
3	DF	NOR	Dejan Corovic (from (Norway) Jerv)
12	GK	NOR	Anders Gundersen (from (Norway) Strømsgodset, previously on loan at (Norway) Sandefjord)
13	DF	DEN	Sune Kiilerich (from (Denmark) Fredericia)
19	FW	NOR	Fabian Stensrud Næss (from (Norway) Moss)
26	MF	NOR	Lars Kilen (Promoted)
28	MF	NOR	Tasso Dwe (Promoted)
29	MF	NOR	Anders Hylen Pedersen (Promoted)

Out:

No.	Pos.	Nation	Player

=== Bodø/Glimt ===
In:

No.	Pos.	Nation	Player
2	DF	NOR	Marius Lode (from (Norway) Bryne)
6	DF	NOR	Vegard Leikvoll Moberg (from (Norway) Sogndal)
7	MF	NOR	Thomas Drage (free agent)
9	FW	NGA	Kachi (on loan from (Norway) Sarpsborg 08)
10	MF	ESP	José Ángel (free agent)
11	MF	SRB	Nemanja Mladenović (from (Serbia) Metalac)
22	FW	NOR	Kristian Fardal Opseth (on loan from (Norway) Sogndal)
25	GK	BRA	Ricardo Friedrich (from (Finland) RoPS)

Out:

No.	Pos.	Nation	Player
2	DF	NOR	Ruben Imingen (retired)
6	DF	GER	Sascha Mockenhaupt (to (Germany) Wehen Wiesbaden)
7	FW	NOR	Fitim Azemi (to (Israel) Maccabi Haifa)
8	MF	NOR	Ole Jørgen Halvorsen (loan return to (Norway) Odd)
9	MF	EGY	Alexander Jakobsen (to (Denmark) Viborg)
10	MF	UKR	Ruslan Babenko (released)
22	FW	RUS	Vadim Manzon (loan return to (Germany) Karlsruher SC)
23	GK	UKR	Serhiy Pohorilyy (released)

=== Elverum ===
In:

No.	Pos.	Nation	Player
2	DF	DEN	Magnus Pedersen (on loan from (Norway) Sogndal)
6	DF	NOR	Stian Simenstad (from (Norway) Gjøvik-Lyn)
14	MF	NOR	Shadi Ali (from (Norway) Follo)
17	MF	NOR	Sivert Solli (on loan from (Norway) Rosenborg)
19	FW	SWE	Amor Layonui (from (Sweden) Degerfors)
20	MF	SWE	Carlos Gaete Moggia (from (Sweden) Eskilstuna)
23	MF	NOR	Marius Hagen (from (Norway) Nest-Sotra)

Out:

No.	Pos.	Nation	Player
11	DF	NOR	Ulrik Balstad (to (Norway) Fram Larvik)
14	FW	NOR	Emil Lynum (to Løten)
17	FW	NOR	Ole Andreas Nesset (to (Norway) Ull/Kisa)
23	MF	NOR	Haris Cirak (loan return to (Sweden) AFC Eskilstuna)
27	MF	NOR	Eivind Fallet (to (Norway) Nybergsund)

=== Florø ===
In:

No.	Pos.	Nation	Player
11	FW	NOR	Oliver Rotihaug (from (Norway) Brann, previously on loan)
17	FW	NOR	Monir Benmoussa (from (Norway) Fredrikstad)
77	DF	NOR	Christopher Lindquist (on loan from (Norway) Strømsgodset)

Out:

No.	Pos.	Nation	Player
—	MF	NOR	Simen Brekkhus (loan return to (Norway) Sogndal)

=== Fredrikstad ===
In:

No.	Pos.	Nation	Player
3	DF	FIN	Jarkko Lahdenmäki (from (Finland) RoPS)
4	DF	CRO	Mislav Leko (from (Croatia) Osijek)
5	DF	NOR	Edvard Skagestad (from (Norway) Aalesund)
7	MF	FIN	Joona Veteli (from (Finland) PS Kemi)
23	MF	NOR	Rino Falk Larsen (from (Norway) Vålerenga)
28	MF	GHA	Razak Nuhu (free agent)
29	DF	ENG	Kevin Wright (from (England) Carlisle United)
33	MF	CRO	Dinko Trebotić (from (Israel) Bnei Yehuda)

Out:

No.	Pos.	Nation	Player
3	DF	ENG	Netan Sansara (to (Canada) Edmonton)
9	FW	NOR	Steffen Nystrøm (released)
17	FW	NOR	Brice Wembangomo (loan return to (Norway) Sarpsborg 08)
21	FW	NOR	Monir Benmoussa (to (Norway) Florø)
23	DF	NOR	Erik Tønne (to (Norway) Levanger)
26	DF	NOR	Martin Thømt Jensen (to (Norway) Moss)
—	FW	NOR	Andreas Aalbu (to (Norway) Ull/Kisa)

=== Jerv ===
In:

No.	Pos.	Nation	Player
3	DF	NOR	Brice Wembangomo (from (Norway) Sarpsborg 08, previously on loan at (Norway) Fredrikstad)
10	MF	ARU	Erixon Danso (from (Ukraine) Stal Kamianske)
13	MF	NGA	Babajide David (on loan from (Denmark) Midtjylland)
17	MF	NOR	Martin Hoel Andersen (from (Norway) Kvik Halden)

Out:

No.	Pos.	Nation	Player
3	DF	NOR	Dejan Corovic (to (Norway) Arendal)
10	MF	NOR	Christoffer Myhre (retired)
21	FW	SEN	Pape Moussa Dioum Sow (released)
89	MF	DEN	Tonny Brochmann (to (Norway) Stabæk)

=== Kongsvinger ===
In:

No.	Pos.	Nation	Player
1	GK	NOR	Simen Lillevik (on loan from (Norway) Stabæk)
13	DF	NOR	Edvard Linnebo Race (on loan from (Norway) Stabæk)
17	MF	NOR	Jørgen Kolstad (on loan from (Norway) Lillestrøm)
19	FW	SWE	Pär Ericsson (from (Sweden) Jönköpings Södra)
23	MF	NOR	Fredrik Sjølstad (from (Norway) Hødd)
24	FW	NOR	Niklas Castro (from (Norway) Vålerenga)
93	GK	RUS	Aleksei Gorodovoy (free agent)

Out:

No.	Pos.	Nation	Player
21	FW	NOR	Simen Stølen (on loan to (Norway) Flisa)

=== Levanger ===
In:

No.	Pos.	Nation	Player
4	DF	SWE	Andreas Wrele (from (Norway) Raufoss)
5	DF	NOR	Pål Aamodt (from (Norway) Bryne)
6	MF	SWE	Joakim Wrele (from (Norway) Hødd)
7	MF	NOR	Ole Ormset Husby (on loan from (Norway) Molde)
9	MF	NOR	Kim Robert Nyborg (from (Norway) Egersund)
11	FW	NGA	Aniekpeno Udo (on loan from (Norway) Viking)
12	GK	NOR	Julian Faye Lund (on loan from (Norway) Rosenborg)
13	FW	NOR	Robert Stene (from (Norway) Ranheim)
15	DF	NOR	Erik Tønne (from (Norway) Fredrikstad)
22	MF	NOR	Horenus Taddese (from (Norway) Verdal)
33	GK	ENG	Lloyd Saxton (on loan from (Sweden) GIF Sundsvall)

Out:

No.	Pos.	Nation	Player
4	DF	NOR	Lars Emil Johannessen Flakk (to (Norway) Stjørdals-Blink)
5	DF	SWE	Rikard Nilsson (released)
6	MF	SWE	Andreas Peterson (released)
9	FW	NOR	Benjamin Stokke (to (Norway) Kristiansund)
11	FW	NOR	Bendik Bye (to (Norway) Sogndal)
14	MF	NOR	Erik Skeie (released)

=== Mjøndalen ===
In:

No.	Pos.	Nation	Player
2	DF	NED	Quint Jansen (from (Norway) Finnsnes)
3	DF	NOR	Petter Havsgård Martinsen (from (Norway) Nest-Sotra)
6	MF	SWE	Pontus Silfwer (from (Sweden) Frej)
10	FW	LTU	Simonas Stankevičius (from (Lithuania) Žalgiris)
22	MF	NOR	Henrik Gulden (from (Germany) Sportfreunde Niederwenigern)
23	DF	NOR	Sondre Solholm Johansen (on loan from (Norway) Strømsgodset)
25	GK	CMR	Georges Bokwé (from (Cameroon) Coton Sport)
31	MF	NOR	Jibril Bojang (from (Norway) Start)

Out:

No.	Pos.	Nation	Player
1	GK	IRN	Sosha Makani (on loan to (Norway) Strømsgodset)
3	DF	NOR	Joachim Solberg Olsen (to (Norway) Sandefjord)
5	DF	NOR	Karanveer Singh Grewal (released)
6	MF	NOR	Michael Stilson (released)
10	MF	NOR	Erik Midtgarden (retired)
23	MF	NOR	Lars Fuhre (to (Sweden) Öster)

=== Ranheim ===
In:

No.	Pos.	Nation	Player
5	DF	NOR	Joakim Solem (from (Norway) Nardo)
10	FW	NOR	Øyvind Storflor (from (Norway) Strømsgodset)
14	MF	NOR	Mats Lillebo (from (Norway) Stjørdal-Blink)
19	FW	NOR	Andreas Rye (from (Norway) Strindheim)
21	MF	NOR	Jakob Tromsdal (from (Norway) Rosenborg)
22	FW	NOR	Michael Karlsen (from (Norway) Hødd)

Out:

No.	Pos.	Nation	Player
10	MF	NOR	John Hou Sæter (loan return to (Norway) Rosenborg)
13	FW	NOR	Robert Stene (to (Norway) Levanger)
25	FW	NOR	Kristian Rømo Skille (retired)

=== Sandnes Ulf ===
In:

No.	Pos.	Nation	Player
6	MF	NOR	Tomas Kristoffersen (from (Norway) Tromsdalen)
8	MF	NOR	Remi Johansen (from (Norway) Brann)
9	FW	NOR	Oddbjørn Skartun (from (Norway) Bryne)
10	MF	NOR	Roy Miljeteig (free agent)
21	FW	NOR	Kjell Rune Sellin (from (Norway) Sandefjord)
33	GK	NOR	Jonas Høidahl (from (Norway) Bryne)

Out:

No.	Pos.	Nation	Player
6	DF	NOR	Trond Erik Bertelsen (released)
11	FW	SWE	Pontus Engblom (released)
16	MF	NOR	Niklas Sandberg (to (Norway) Ull/Kisa)
17	MF	NOR	Eirik Schulze (to (Norway) Sogndal)
21	MF	KOS	Anel Raskaj (released)
23	MF	ISL	Steinþór Freyr Þorsteinsson (loan return to (Norway) Viking)
25	DF	NOR	Vegard Skjørestad (released)

=== Start ===
In:

No.	Pos.	Nation	Player
5	MF	ENG	Nigel Reo-Coker (free agent)
6	DF	NOR	Simon Larsen (from (Norway) Vålerenga)
7	MF	NED	Niels Vorthoren (from (Sweden) BK Häcken)
19	FW	NGA	Ibrahim Abubakar (from (Tunisia) Bizertin)
25	GK	NOR	Benjamin Boujar (from (Norway) Vindbjart)

Out:

No.	Pos.	Nation	Player
4	DF	USA	Alex DeJohn (released)
7	MF	NGA	Chidiebere Nwakali (loan return to (England) Manchester City)
8	FW	NOR	Espen Hoff (retired)
11	FW	NGA	Uduak Idemokon (released)
18	MF	NOR	Jibril Bojang (to (Norway) Mjøndalen)
19	FW	NGA	Austin Ikenna (released)

=== Strømmen ===
In:

No.	Pos.	Nation	Player
6	DF	NOR	Henrik Bredeli (on loan from (Norway) Strømsgodset)
9	MF	NOR	Markus Brændsrød (from (Norway) Lillestrøm, previously on loan)

Out:

No.	Pos.	Nation	Player
1	GK	NOR	Tarjei Aase Omenås (to (Norway) Sogndal)
2	DF	NOR	Frode Bjørnevik (retired)
6		NOR	Fredrik Nilsen (to (Norway) Fu/Vo)
11	FW	NOR	Naser Dernjani (released)
17		NOR	Kristian Emil Bjørndalen (on loan to (Norway) Lørenskog)
19	FW	GER	Joy-Slayd Mickels (to (Germany) Alemannia Aachen)
22		NOR	Ole Marius Aasen (to (Norway) Notodden)
30	MF	NOR	Aleksander Melgalvis (to (Norway) Lillestrøm)

=== Tromsdalen ===
In:

No.	Pos.	Nation	Player
9	FW	NOR	Christer Johnsgård (free agent)
17	DF	NOR	Lasse Nilsen (on loan from (Norway) Tromsø)
21	MF	NOR	Mathias Dahl Abelsen (from (Norway) Alta)

Out:

No.	Pos.	Nation	Player
13	MF	NOR	Tomas Kristoffersen (to (Norway) Sandnes Ulf)
23	GK	NOR	Eirik Sørensen (retired)

=== Ull/Kisa ===
In:

No.	Pos.	Nation	Player
4	DF	SOM	Ciise Aden Abshir (from (Norway) KFUM)
5	DF	NOR	Nikolas Walstad (from (Norway) Lillestrøm 2)
10	MF	NOR	Niklas Sandberg (from (Norway) Sandnes Ulf)
14	FW	NOR	Ole Andreas Nesset (from (Norway) Elverum)
21	DF	FRA	Emmanuel Troudart (from (France) Rouen)
25	MF	NOR	Martin Torp (from (Norway) Sandefjord, previously on loan)
31	GK	NOR	Stefan Hagerup (from (Norway) Sogndal)
37	FW	NOR	Andreas Aalbu (from (Norway) Fredrikstad)

Out:

No.	Pos.	Nation	Player
4	FW	NOR	Riki Alba (loan return to (Norway) Vålerenga)
22	DF	SWE	Martin Falkeborn (loan return to (Norway) Lillestrøm)
27	MF	NOR	Fredrik Krogstad (loan return to (Norway) Lillestrøm)
30	GK	IRL	Sean McDermott (to (Norway) Kristiansund)

=== Åsane ===
In:

No.	Pos.	Nation	Player
5	MF	NOR	Fredrik Heggland (from (Norway) Brann)
8	MF	NOR	Jonas Hestetun (from (Norway) Fana)
9	FW	RUS	Vadim Manzon (from (Germany) Karlsruher SC)
12	GK	NOR	Borger Thomas (from (Norway) Strømsgodset)

Out:

No.	Pos.	Nation	Player
8	DF	NOR	Fredrik Pallesen Knudsen (loan return to (Norway) Brann)
