= 2014 Eliteserien promotion/relegation play-offs =

Norwegian football league play-offs

The 2014 Eliteserien promotion/relegation play-offs was the 41st time a spot in the Norwegian top flight was decided by play-off matches between top tier and second level clubs.

At the end of the 2014 season, Sogndal and Sandnes Ulf were relegated directly to 2015 OBOS-ligaen, and was replaced by Sandefjord and Tromsø who were directly promoted.

== Background ==
The play-offs between Eliteserien and 1. divisjon have been held every year since 1972 with exceptions in 1994 and 2011. They take place for the two divisions following the conclusion of the regular season and are contested by the fourteenth-placed club in Eliteserien and the four clubs finishing below the automatic promotion places in 1. divisjon. The fixtures are determined by final league position – the first to knockout-rounds begins with the four teams in the 1. divisjon: 3rd v 6th and 4th v 5th, and the winner then play each other to determine who meet the Eliteserien club in the final.

== Qualified teams ==
Five teams entered a play-off for the last Eliteserien spot for the 2015 season. These were:

- Brann (14th placed team in the Tippeligaen)
- Mjøndalen (third placed team in the 1. divisjon)
- Kristiansund (fourth placed team in the 1. divisjon)
- Bærum (fifth placed team in the 1. divisjon)
- Fredrikstad (sixth placed team in the 1. divisjon)

The four 1. divisjon teams first played a single game knockout tournament, with the winner (Mjøndalen) advancing to a two-legged tie against the Eliteserien team (Brann) for the 16th and final spot in the 2015 Eliteserien season. Mjøndalen gained promotion to the top flight with a 4–1 win on aggregate against Brann.

== Matches ==
The third to sixth-placed teams in 2014 1. divisjon took part in the promotion play-offs; these were single leg knockout matches, two semi-finals and a final. The winners of the second round, Mjøndalen, advanced to play the 14th placed team in Tippeligaen over two legs in the Eliteserien play-offs for a spot in the top-flight next season.

=== First round ===
Final league position – 1. divisjon
Pos	Team	Pld	W	D	L	GF	GA	GD	Pts
3	Mjøndalen	30	14	9	7	57	36	+21	51
4	Kristiansund	30	13	10	7	53	39	+14	49
5	Bærum	30	15	4	11	51	52	–1	49
6	Fredrikstad	30	14	6	10	35	26	+9	48

9 November 2014
13:00 CET (UTC+1)

Kristiansund	0–2	Bærum
	Report	Warshaw 54'; Sandbu 90'

Kristiansund Stadion, Kristiansund
Attendance: 1,585
Referee: Anders Johnsen
9 November 2014
15:30 CET (UTC+1)

Mjøndalen	2–0	Fredrikstad
Sansara 5' (o.g.); Arneberg 52'	Report

Mjøndalen Stadion, Nedre Eiker
Attendance: 1,427
Referee: Ola Hobber Nilsen

=== Second round ===
15 November 2014
19:00 CET (UTC+1)

Mjøndalen	4–1 (a.e.t.)	Bærum
Flasza 90' (o.g.); Olsen 108'; Solberg 118' (pen.); Kapidzic 120'	Report	Tollås 75'

Mjøndalen Stadion, Nedre Eiker
Attendance: 1,602
Referee: Trond Ivar Døvle

=== Final ===
The 14th-placed team, Brann, took part in a two-legged play-off against Mjøndalen, the winners of the 2014 First Division promotion play-offs, to decide who would play in the 2015 Tippeligaen.

First leg

23 November 2014
19:00 CET (UTC+1)

Brann	1–1	Mjøndalen
Skaanes 53'	Report	Diomande 37'

Brann Stadion, Bergen
Attendance: 14,225
Referee: Brage Sandmoen

Second leg

26 November 2014
19:00 CET (UTC+1)

Mjøndalen	3–0	Brann
Kapidzic 27', 67'; Diomande 64'	Report

Mjøndalen Stadion, Nedre Eiker
Attendance: 2,500
Referee: Svein Oddvar Moen

Mjøndalen won 4–1 on aggregate and gained promotion to the 2015 Tippeligaen; Brann were relegated to the First Division.

== Bracket ==
First round
3	Mjøndalen	2
6	Fredrikstad	0
4	Kristiansund	0
5	Bærum	2

Second round
3	Mjøndalen (a.e.t.)	4
5	Bærum	1

Final round
14	Brann	1
3	Mjøndalen	1
