= Edvard Linnebo Race =

Norwegian footballer (born 1997)

Edvard Race
Personal information
- Full name: Edvard Linnebo Race
- Date of birth: 22 May 1997 (age 29)
- Place of birth: Moss, Norway
- Position: Defender

Team information
- Current team: Lyn
- Number: 3

Youth career
- Sprint-Jeløy
- Moss
- –2015: Stabæk

Senior career*
Years	Team	Apps	(Gls)
2015–2017	Stabæk	8	(0)
2017	→ Kongsvinger (loan)	4	(0)
2018–2021	Raufoss	89	(5)
2022	Arendal	22	(0)
2023–2024	Olympic Charleroi	11	(0)
2024	Jerv	7	(0)
2025–	Moss	25	(0)
2026–	Lyn	16	(2)
- * Club domestic league appearances and goals as of 14 November 2026

Edvard Linnebo Race (born 22 May 1997) is a Norwegian footballer who plays as a defender for Lyn.

He started his youth career in SK Sprint-Jeløy, and also featured for Moss FK before joining Stabæk's junior team while attending the Norwegian College of Elite Sports.

He made his senior debut in the first round of the 2015 Norwegian Football Cup, and then his league debut as an 88th-minute substitute against Bodø/Glimt in November 2015. Race then started his first match in March 2016 against Aalesund.

Despite scoring in the last friendly match before the kickoff of the 2017 season, Race was sent to Kongsvinger in a four-month loan on the last day of the winter transfer window. He returned to Stabæk, but did not play, and ahead of the 2018 season he went on to Raufoss.

== Career statistics ==
As of 17 March 2020

Season	Club	Division	League		Cup		Total	
Season	Club	Division	Apps	Goals	Apps	Goals	Apps	Goals
2015	Stabæk	Eliteserien	1	0	0	0	1	0
2016	Stabæk	Eliteserien	7	0	1	0	8	0
2017	Stabæk	Eliteserien	0	0	0	0	0	0
2017	Kongsvinger	1. divisjon	4	0	1	0	5	0
2018	Raufoss	2. divisjon	22	2	2	0	24	2
2019	Raufoss	1. divisjon	24	1	2	0	26	1
Career Total			58	3	6	0	64	3
