= Sondre Liseth =

Norwegian footballer (born 1997)

Personal information
- Full name: Sondre Liseth
- Date of birth: 30 September 1997 (age 29)
- Place of birth: Ålesund, Norway
- Height: 1.82 m (6 ft 0 in)
- Positions: Attacking midfielder; forward

Team information
- Current team: Górnik Zabrze
- Number: 23

Youth career
- –2014: Gneist

Senior career*
Years	Team	Apps	(Gls)
2014–2015	Gneist	24	(13)
2015–2017	Fana	53	(20)
2018	Nest-Sotra	27	(8)
2019–2021	Mjøndalen	51	(7)
2021–2025	Haugesund	55	(6)
2025–	Górnik Zabrze	49	(9)
- * Club domestic league appearances and goals as of 00:19, 11 October 2026 (UTC)

Sondre Liseth (born 30 September 1997) is a Norwegian professional footballer who plays as an attacking midfielder or forward for Polish club Górnik Zabrze.

== Career statistics ==
As of match played 27 August 2026

Appearances and goals by club, season and competition
Club	Season	League			National cup (Note: Includes Norwegian Cup, Polish Cup)		Europe		Other		Total	
Club	Season	Division	Apps	Goals	Apps	Goals	Apps	Goals	Apps	Goals	Apps	Goals
Fana	2015	2. divisjon	10	2	0	0	—		—		10	2
Fana	2016	2. divisjon	24	10	2	1	—		—		26	11
Fana	2017	2. divisjon	19	8	1	0	—		—		20	8
Fana	Total		53	20	3	1	—		—		56	21
Nest-Sotra	2018	1. divisjon	27	8	3	1	—		1 (Note: Appearance in Eliteserien promotion/relegation play-offs)	0	31	9
Mjøndalen	2019	Eliteserien	24	3	5	1	—		—		29	4
Mjøndalen	2020	Eliteserien	27	4	—		—		1	0	28	4
Mjøndalen	Total		51	7	5	1	—		1	0	57	8
Haugesund	2021	Eliteserien	28	5	1	0	—		—		29	5
Haugesund	2022	Eliteserien	0	0	0	0	—		—		0	0
Haugesund	2023	Eliteserien	5	0	1	0	—		—		6	0
Haugesund	2024	Eliteserien	22	1	1	0	—		—		23	1
Haugesund	Total		55	6	3	0	—		—		58	6
Górnik Zabrze	2024–25	Ekstraklasa	12	0	—		—		—		12	0
Górnik Zabrze	2025–26	Ekstraklasa	30	8	5	0	—		—		35	8
Górnik Zabrze	2026–27	Ekstraklasa	3	0	0	0	5 (Note: Two appearances in UEFA Champions League, one appearance in UEFA Europa League, two appearances and one goal in UEFA Conference League)	1	1 (Note: Appearance in Polish Super Cup)	0	9	1
Górnik Zabrze	Total		45	8	5	0	5	1	1	0	56	9
Career total			231	49	19	3	5	1	3	0	258	53

== Honours ==
Górnik Zabrze

- Polish Cup: 2025–26
