= Adrian Aleksander Hansen =

Norwegian footballer (born 2001)

Personal information
- Date of birth: 3 September 2001 (age 25)
- Position: Defender

Team information
- Current team: Kongsvinger
- Number: 6

Youth career
- –2016: Konnerud
- 2019–2020: Mjøndalen

Senior career*
Years	Team	Apps	(Gls)
2018	Konnerud	17	(1)
2020–2023	Mjøndalen	49	(3)
2020	→ Fram (loan)	11	(0)
2023–2025	Raufoss	65	(4)
2026–	Kongsvinger	4	(0)
- * Club domestic league appearances and goals as of 14 November 2026

Adrian Aleksander Hansen (born 3 September 2001) is a Norwegian football defender who plays for Kongsvinger.

Growing up in the club Konnerud IL, where he played senior football in 2018. He then joined Mjøndalen as a junior, albeit making his senior debut for them in the 2019 Norwegian Football Cup. In 2020 he was loaned out to Fram Larvik. He made his Eliteserien debut in July 2021 against Odd.

He is a son of Mjøndalen manager Vegard Hansen.
