= William Sell =

Norwegian footballer (born 1998)

Personal information
- Full name: William Sælid Sell
- Date of birth: 20 December 1998 (age 27)
- Height: 1.86 m (6 ft 1 in)
- Position: Defender

Team information
- Current team: Lyn
- Number: 4

Youth career
- –2013: Hvittingfoss
- 2013–2014: Kongsberg
- 2014–2016: Mjøndalen

Senior career*
Years	Team	Apps	(Gls)
2016–2021	Mjøndalen	107	(5)
2021–	Lyn	140	(15)

International career
2016	Norway U18	10	(2)
2017	Norway U19	3	(0)
2019	Norway U21	2	(0)
- * Club domestic league appearances and goals as of 14 November 2026

William Sælid Sell (born 20 December 1998) is a Norwegian footballer who plays as a defender for Lyn.

== Career ==
Hailing from Hvittingfoss, Sell joined Mjøndalen in 2014. He made his senior debut at age 17 in April 2016. On 31 August 2021, he transferred to Norwegian Third Division club Lyn on a contract until the end of the 2023 season.

== Career statistics ==
As of match played 23 October 2022

Appearances and goals by club, season and competition
Club	Season	League			National Cup		Other		Total	
Club	Season	Division	Apps	Goals	Apps	Goals	Apps	Goals	Apps	Goals
Mjøndalen	2016	1. divisjon	20	2	1	0	1 (Note: Appearance in promotion play-offs.)	0	22	2
Mjøndalen	2017	1. divisjon	13	1	2	0	—		15	1
Mjøndalen	2018	1. divisjon	24	1	4	0	—		28	1
Mjøndalen	2019	Eliteserien	26	1	4	0	—		30	1
Mjøndalen	2020	Eliteserien	14	0	—		0 (Note: Appearance in relegation play-offs.)	0	14	0
Mjøndalen	2021	Eliteserien	10	0	2	0	—		12	0
Mjøndalen	Total		107	5	13	0	1	0	121	5
Lyn	2021	3. divisjon	8	0	0	0	—		8	0
Lyn	2022	3. divisjon	26	6	1	0	—		27	6
Lyn	Total		34	6	1	0	0	0	35	6
Career total			141	11	14	0	1	0	156	11
