= Frank Bamenye =

Norwegian footballer (born 2001)

Personal information
- Full name: Frank Bamenye Bizoza
- Date of birth: 23 October 2001 (age 25)
- Place of birth: Muyovozi, Tanzania
- Height: 1.75 m (5 ft 9 in)
- Position: Midfielder

Team information
- Current team: Gamle Oslo

Youth career
- –2017: Skiold
- 2017–2019: Mjøndalen

Senior career*
Years	Team	Apps	(Gls)
2019–2022	Mjøndalen	9	(0)
2022	→ Ørn Horten (loan)	7	(3)
2023–2024	Ørn Horten	40	(3)
2025–	Gamle Oslo		
- * Club domestic league appearances and goals as of 1 January 2025

Frank Bamenye Bizoza (born 23 October 2001) is a footballer who plays as a midfielder for Gamle Oslo FK.

Born in Tanzania to Burundian parents, Bamenye migrated to Norway at the age of 2. Hailing from Drammen club Skiold, he went to Mjøndalen as a junior and made his senior debut in August 2019 against Kristiansund.
