= Jibril Bojang =

Gambian footballer (born 1994)

Personal information
- Date of birth: 13 September 1994 (age 32)
- Place of birth: Oslo, Norway
- Height: 1.83 m (6 ft 0 in)
- Position: Forward

Team information
- Current team: Bærum
- Number: 18

Youth career
- –2010: Skeid
- 2011–2013: Vålerenga

Senior career*
| Years | Team | Apps | (Gls) |
| 2010 | Skeid | 1 | (0) |
| 2013 | Drøbak-Frogn | | |
| 2014–2015 | Skeid | 20 | (3) |
| 2015 | Grorud | 5 | (0) |
| 2016 | Lørenskog | 8 | (1) |
| 2016 | Start | 9 | (0) |
| 2017–2019 | Mjøndalen | 52 | (7) |
| 2020–2021 | Masr | 6 | (0) |
| 2021–2022 | Strømmen | 12 | (3) |
| 2023– | Bærum | 16 | (1) |

International career^{‡}
| 2011 | Norway U17 | 2 | (0) |
| 2013 | Norway U19 | 3 | (0) |
| 2019– | Gambia | 1 | (0) |
- * Club domestic league appearances and goals as of 7 December 2023 ‡ National team caps and goals as of 12 June 2019

Jibril Bojang (born 13 September 1994) is a football striker who currently plays for 2. divisjon side Bærum. Born in Norway, he represents the Gambia national team.

== Club career ==
Bojang is of Gambian descent. He played youth football in Skeid, and made his first-team debut in the last match of the 2010 season. From 2011 he played junior football for Vålerenga for two and a half seasons, before joining Drøbak-Frogn in the summer of 2013. In 2014, he returned to Skeid, spending one and a half season there. In late 2015 he played for Grorud, and in early 2016 for Lørenskog. In July 2016 he was signed by top-tier club Start, and made his debut in a 2–4 home loss against Vålerenga.

Bojang had featured for Vålerenga's first team in a 2013 friendly match. Prior to joining Start, Bojang also negotiated a transfer with Mjøndalen IF, Kristiansund BK and Falkenbergs FF. Ahead of the 2017 season, on the last day of the winter transfer window, he did join Mjøndalen IF.

On 21 March 2023, after a few weeks of trial training, Bærum announced that they had signed a contract with Bojang. He made a contract for the 2023-season.

== International ==
He made his Gambia national football team debut on 12 June 2019 in a friendly against Morocco, as a 62nd-minute substitute for Sulayman Bojang.
