= Jacob Bergström =

Swedish footballer

Personal information
- Date of birth: 26 April 1995 (age 31)
- Place of birth: Sweden
- Height: 6 ft 3 in (1.91 m)
- Position: Striker

Team information
- Current team: Mjällby
- Number: 18

Youth career
- Karlskrona

Senior career*
Years	Team	Apps	(Gls)
2013–2014	Karlskrona	17	(3)
2015–2017	Ronneby	50	(56)
2018–2019	Mjällby	48	(16)
2019	Mjøndalen	10	(0)
2020–2022	Mjällby	72	(19)
2023	Djurgården	6	(0)
2023–	Mjällby	91	(26)
- * Club domestic league appearances and goals as of 16 September 2026

Jacob Bergström (born 26 April 1995) is a Swedish footballer who plays as a forward for Allsvenskan club Mjällby. (Note: Jacob Bergström at WorldFootball.net)

== Career ==
He played youth football for Karlskrona. In 2013 he was drafted into the senior squad.

Bergström first signed for Mjällby in 2018, whilst still working at a Subway sandwich shop.

In 2019 he signed for Norwegian club Mjøndalen.

In 2020 Bergström went back to Mjällby after they promoted to Allsvenskan. He turned professional aged 24.

After playing for Djurgården, he rejoined Mjällby in 2023. Bergström, his wife, and two children live in Hallevik, and Bergström cycles to training at Mjällby.

== Career statistics ==
=== Club ===
As of match played 16 September 2026

Appearances and goals by club, season and competition
Club	Season	League			National Cup		Europe		Total	
Club	Season	Division	Apps	Goals	Apps	Goals	Apps	Goals	Apps	Goals
Karlskrona	2013	Division 2	9	0	0	0	-		9	0
Karlskrona	2014	Division 2	8	3	0	0	-		8	3
Karlskrona	Total		17	3	0	0	-	-	17	3
Ronneby	2015	Division 4	14	6	0	0	-		14	6
Ronneby	2016	Division 3	21	31	0	0	-		21	31
Ronneby	2017	Division 3	15	19	1	0	-		16	19
Ronneby	Total		50	56	1	0	-	-	51	56
Mjällby	2018	Division 1	27	8	0	0	-		27	8
Mjällby	2019	Superettan	21	8	0	0	-		21	8
Mjällby	Total		48	16	0	0	-	-	48	16
Mjøndalen	2019	Eliteserien	10	0	0	0	-		10	0
Mjøndalen	Total		10	0	0	0	-	-	10	0
Mjällby	2020	Allsvenskan	28	8	5	1	-		33	9
Mjällby	2021	Allsvenskan	29	9	4	1	-		33	10
Mjällby	2022	Allsvenskan	15	2	1	0	-		16	2
Mjällby	Total		72	19	10	2	-	-	82	21
Djurgården	2023	Allsvenskan	6	0	4	0	2	0	12	0
Djurgården	Total		6	0	4	0	2	0	12	0
Mjällby	2023	Allsvenskan	15	3	1	0	-		16	3
Mjällby	2024	Allsvenskan	26	8	4	1	-		30	9
Mjällby	2025	Allsvenskan	29	5	3	0	-		32	5
Mjällby	2026	Allsvenskan	21	10	3	4	6	1	30	15
Mjällby	Total		91	26	11	5	6	1	108	32
Career total			294	120	26	7	8	1	328	128

== Honours ==
Mjällby IF

- Allsvenskan: 2025
- Svenska Cupen: 2025–26
