= Julian Faye Lund =

Norwegian footballer (born 1999)

Personal information
- Full name: Julian Rekdahl Faye Lund
- Date of birth: 20 May 1999 (age 27)
- Place of birth: Oslo, Norway
- Height: 1.85 m (6 ft 1 in)
- Position: Goalkeeper

Team information
- Current team: Bodø/Glimt
- Number: 1

Youth career
- Oppsal
- 2015–2017: Rosenborg

Senior career*
Years	Team	Apps	(Gls)
2014–2015	Oppsal	5	(0)
2015–2022	Rosenborg	17	(0)
2017–2018	→ Levanger (loan)	55	(0)
2019	→ Mjøndalen (loan)	25	(0)
2021	→ HamKam (loan)	9	(0)
2022–	Bodø/Glimt	8	(0)

International career^{‡}
2014	Norway U15	2	(0)
2016	Norway U17	4	(0)
2017	Norway U18	3	(0)
2018	Norway U19	8	(0)
2019	Norway U20	3	(0)
2018–2020	Norway U21	6	(0)
- * Club domestic league appearances and goals as of 20 September 2026 ‡ National team caps and goals as of 10 October 2020

Julian Rekdahl Faye Lund (born 20 May 1999) is a Norwegian professional footballer who plays as a goalkeeper for Bodø/Glimt.

== Career ==
Faye Lund played for Oppsal in his early career, and joined Rosenborg in the middle of the 2015 season.

In 2017 he was sent out on loan to Levanger in the OBOS-ligaen. After starting the first matches on the bench he went on to become a regular starter for the team. At the end of the season the loan was extended for the 2018 season. In 2019 he was loaned out to Mjøndalen.

== Career statistics ==
As of match played 20 September 2026

Appearances and goals by club, season and competition
Club	Season	League			National cup		Europe		Total	
Club	Season	Division	Apps	Goals	Apps	Goals	Apps	Goals	Apps	Goals
Oppsal	2014	3. divisjon	1	0	0	0	–		1	0
Oppsal	2015	3. divisjon	4	0	0	0	–		4	0
Oppsal	Total		5	0	0	0	–		5	0
Rosenborg	2015	Tippeligaen	0	0	0	0	–		0	0
Rosenborg	2016	Tippeligaen	0	0	0	0	–		0	0
Rosenborg	2020	Eliteserien	12	0	0	0	1	0	13	0
Rosenborg	2021	Eliteserien	5	0	0	0	–		5	0
Rosenborg	2022	Eliteserien	0	0	2	0	–		2	0
Rosenborg	Total		17	0	2	0	1	0	20	0
Levanger (loan)	2017	Norwegian First Division	27	0	2	0	–		29	0
Levanger (loan)	2018	Norwegian First Division	28	0	3	0	–		31	0
Levanger (loan)	Total		55	0	5	0	–		60	0
Mjøndalen (loan)	2019	Eliteserien	25	0	3	0	–		28	0
HamKam (loan)	2021	Norwegian First Division	9	0	0	0	–		9	0
Bodø/Glimt	2022	Eliteserien	4	0	0	0	1	0	5	0
Bodø/Glimt	2023	Eliteserien	2	0	6	0	3	0	11	0
Bodø/Glimt	2024	Eliteserien	0	0	0	0	1	0	1	0
Bodø/Glimt	2025	Eliteserien	0	0	3	0	0	0	3	0
Bodø/Glimt	2026	Eliteserien	2	0	3	0	1	0	6	0
Bodø/Glimt	Total		8	0	12	0	6	0	26	0
Career total			119	0	22	0	7	0	148	0

== Honours ==
- Norwegian Cup: 2025–26
