= Georges Bokwé =

Cameroonian footballer

Personal information
- Full name: Georges Motase Bokwé
- Date of birth: 14 July 1989 (age 37)
- Place of birth: Big Nganio, Cameroon
- Height: 1.90 m (6 ft 3 in)
- Position: Goalkeeper

Team information
- Current team: Åssiden

Senior career*
| Years | Team | Apps | (Gls) |
| 2011–2013 | New Star de Douala | | |
| 2014–2016 | Coton Sport | | |
| 2017–2019 | Mjøndalen | 19 | (0) |
| 2022– | Åssiden | | |
Medal record
Men's football
Representing Cameroon
Africa Cup of Nations
| Winner | 2017 Gabon |
- * Club domestic league appearances and goals as of 8 July 2018

Georges Motase Bokwé (born 14 July 1989) is a Cameroonian footballer who plays as a goalkeeper.

== Club career ==
On 23 March 2017, Bokwe signed a one-year contract with Mjøndalen IF from Coton Sport FC, extending his contract with Mjøndalen until 2020 on 25 May 2017. In March 2019 he broke his leg in a friendly match for Mjøndalen, and never returned to play for the Norwegian club.

In 2022 he returned to play for a nearby club, fifth-tier Åssiden.

== International career ==
Bokwé won an unofficial cap at the 2014 Central African Games, playing against Central African Republic. He was a part of the international squad in 2017 who won the 2017 African Cup of Nations in Gabon. He is also a part of the international squad for the 2017 FIFA Confederations Cup.

== Honours ==
=== Cameroon ===
- Africa Cup of Nations: 2017
