= Jorge Vieira (footballer, born 1991) =

Portuguese footballer

Personal information
- Full name: Jorge Miguel Soares Vieira
- Date of birth: 8 January 1991 (age 35)
- Place of birth: Massarelos, Portugal
- Height: 1.84 m (6 ft 0 in)
- Position: Goalkeeper

Team information
- Current team: Fram
- Number: 1

Youth career
- 2000–2004: Boavista
- 2004–2005: Pasteleira
- 2005–2006: Boavista
- 2006–2007: Pasteleira
- 2007–2009: Padroense
- 2009: Gondomar

Senior career*
| Years | Team | Apps | (Gls) |
| 2009–2011 | Gondomar | 8 | (0) |
| 2011–2012 | Doxa | 14 | (0) |
| 2012–2014 | AEK Kouklia | 38 | (0) |
| 2014–2015 | Anagennisi Deryneia | 24 | (0) |
| 2015–2016 | Karmiotissa | 24 | (0) |
| 2016–2017 | Anagennisi Deryneia | 2 | (0) |
| 2017–2019 | Ørn Horten | 62 | (0) |
| 2019–2020 | Mjøndalen | 3 | (0) |
| 2021 | Egersund | 26 | (0) |
| 2021– | Fram | 42 | (0) |
- * Club domestic league appearances and goals as of 7 December 2023

Jorge Miguel Soares Vieira (born 8 January 1991 in Massarelos) is a Portuguese footballer who plays for Norwegian club Fram as a goalkeeper.

On 11 November 2023, Vieira was the starting goalkeeper in Fram's 10-1 loss to Lyn.
