= Per-Magnus Steiring =

Norwegian footballer (born 1997)

Personal information
- Date of birth: 7 February 1997 (age 29)
- Place of birth: Bodø, Norway
- Height: 1.88 m (6 ft 2 in)
- Position: Centre-back

Team information
- Current team: HB
- Number: 3

Youth career
- –2012: Fauske/Sprint
- 2014–2016: Rosenborg

Senior career*
Years	Team	Apps	(Gls)
2012–2013	Fauske/Sprint	18	(4)
2015–2016	Rosenborg	0	(0)
2016	→ Viking (loan)	3	(0)
2017–2020	Sogndal	71	(2)
2019	→ Mjøndalen (loan)	2	(0)
2020–2022	Kongsvinger	41	(4)
2022–2025	Skeid	91	(9)
2026–	HB	22	(0)

International career
2013	Norway U16	10	(1)
2014	Norway U17	6	(0)
2015	Norway U18	11	(2)
2016	Norway U19	3	(0)
- * Club domestic league appearances and goals as of 1 November 2026

Per-Magnus Steiring (born 7 February 1997) is a Norwegian footballer who plays as a centre-back for HB.

== Career ==
He hails from Valnesfjord, and made his debut for FK Fauske/Sprint in 2012. Following trials with RSC Anderlecht, Tromsø IL and Bodø/Glimt, Steiring opted to join Rosenborg BK ahead of the 2014 season. He made his senior debut in a friendly match in January 2014, but did not become a fixture in the first team.

In 2015, he featured in the first two rounds of the Norwegian Football Cup, which Rosenborg eventually won. He also captained the senior B team and won the Norwegian cup with the junior team. In 2016, he again played the first two rounds of the Norwegian Football Cup. In the summer, he was loaned out to Viking FK, and made his Norwegian Premier League debut as a substitute in August 2016, against Rosenborg nonetheless.

In January 2017, he signed for Sogndal. In September 2020, he signed a two-and-a-half-year contract with Kongsvinger. In August 2022, he moved to Skeid.

== Career statistics ==
As of match played 5 November 2022

Appearances and goals by club, season and competition
Club	Season	Division	League		Cup		Other		Total	
Club	Season	Division	Apps	Goals	Apps	Goals	Apps	Goals	Apps	Goals
Rosenborg	2015	Eliteserien	0	0	2	0	—		2	0
Rosenborg	2016	Eliteserien	0	0	2	0	—		2	0
Rosenborg	Total		0	0	4	0	0	0	4	0
Viking (loan)	2016	Eliteserien	3	0	0	0	—		3	0
Sogndal	2017	Eliteserien	20	1	2	0	2 (Note: Appearances in relegation play-offs)	0	24	1
Sogndal	2018	1. divisjon	26	1	2	0	2 (Note: Appearances in promotion play-offs)	0	30	1
Sogndal	2019	1. divisjon	15	0	3	1	—		18	1
Sogndal	2020	1. divisjon	10	0	—		—		10	0
Sogndal	Total		71	2	7	1	4	0	82	3
Mjøndalen (loan)	2019	Eliteserien	2	0	0	0	—		2	0
Kongsvinger	2020	1. divisjon	15	1	—		—		15	1
Kongsvinger	2021	2. divisjon	9	1	2	0	—		11	1
Kongsvinger	2022	1. divisjon	17	2	2	0	—		19	2
Kongsvinger	Total		41	4	4	0	0	0	45	4
Skeid	2022	1. divisjon	10	1	0	0	2	0	12	1
Career total			127	7	15	1	6	0	148	8

== Honours ==
=== Club ===
Rosenborg

- Norwegian Football Cup (2): 2015, 2016
- Norwegian U-19 Championship (1): 2015
