= Alfred Scriven =

Kenyan footballer (born 1998)

Personal information
- Full name: Alfred Richard Scriven
- Date of birth: 26 January 1998 (age 28)
- Place of birth: Nairobi, Kenya
- Position: Forward

Team information
- Current team: Bryne
- Number: 11

Youth career
- Hallingdal

Senior career*
Years	Team	Apps	(Gls)
2015–2017	Hallingdal	58	(26)
2018–2021	Mjøndalen	21	(3)
2019	→ Ullensaker/Kisa (loan)	14	(3)
2020	→ Asker (loan)	18	(5)
2021–2023	Hødd	68	(21)
2024–	Bryne	76	(12)

International career^{‡}
2023	Kenya	1	(0)
- * Club domestic league appearances and goals as of 14 November 2026 ‡ National team caps and goals as of 02:13, 30 August 2023 (UTC)

Alfred Richard Scriven (born 26 January 1998) is a Kenyan professional footballer who plays as a forward for Bryne and the Kenya national team.

== Club career ==
Loaned to Ullensaker/Kisa in 2019, he went on his second loan in 2020, to Asker.

== International career ==
Scriven was born in Kenya to an English father and Kenyan mother. He was called up to the Kenya national team in March 2023. He made his debut with them in a 2–1 friendly loss to Iran on 28 March 2023.

== Career statistics ==
As of 14 November 2026

Club	Season	Division	League		Cup		Other		Total	
Club	Season	Division	Apps	Goals	Apps	Goals	Apps	Goals	Apps	Goals
Hallingdal	2015	3. divisjon	21	3	0	0	0	0	21	3
Hallingdal	2016	3. divisjon	16	5	0	0	0	0	16	5
Hallingdal	2017	4. divisjon	21	18	2	0	0	0	23	18
Hallingdal	Total		58	26	2	0	0	0	60	26
Mjøndalen	2018	1. divisjon	6	1	1	1	0	0	7	2
Mjøndalen	2019	Eliteserien	9	2	3	0	0	0	12	2
Mjøndalen	2020	Eliteserien	1	0	0	0	0	0	1	0
Mjøndalen	2021	Eliteserien	5	0	1	1	0	0	6	1
Mjøndalen	Total		21	3	5	2	0	0	26	5
Mjøndalen 2	2018	4. divisjon	25	29	—				25	29
Mjøndalen 2	2019	3. divisjon	14	6	—				14	6
Mjøndalen 2	Total		39	35	—				39	35
Ullensaker/Kisa (loan)	2019	1. divisjon	14	3	0	0	0	0	14	3
Asker (loan)	2020	2. divisjon	18	5	—		4 (Note: Qualification to 1. divisjon)	0	22	5
Hødd	2021	PostNord-ligaen	16	6	0	0	4	0	20	6
Hødd	2022	PostNord-ligaen	24	7	2	0	0	0	26	8
Hødd	2023	OBOS-ligaen	28	8	1	0	2	0	31	8
Hødd	Total		68	21	3	0	6	0	77	22
Bryne	2024	OBSO-ligaen	29	6	4	3	0	0	33	9
Bryne	2025	Eliteserien	29	3	4	0	2 (Note: Elitserien relegation playoff matches)	0	35	3
Bryne	2026	Norwegian First Division	18	3	2	1	0	0	20	4
Bryne	Total		76	12	10	4	2	0	88	16
Career total			294	105	20	5	12	0	326	112
