= Sondre Solholm Johansen =

Norwegian footballer (born 1995)

Sondre Johansen
Personal information
- Full name: Sondre Solholm Johansen
- Date of birth: 7 July 1995 (age 31)
- Place of birth: Asker, Norway
- Height: 1.90 m (6 ft 3 in)
- Position: Centre-back

Team information
- Current team: Odd
- Number: 15

Youth career
- Asker
- 2011–2012: Stabæk

Senior career*
Years	Team	Apps	(Gls)
2012–2014	Stabæk 2	42	(4)
2014	Lyn	13	(1)
2015	Strømsgodset 3	1	(0)
2015–2016	Strømsgodset 2	44	(1)
2016–2017	Strømsgodset	0	(0)
2017	→ Mjøndalen (loan)	12	(0)
2017–2021	Mjøndalen	112	(11)
2017	Mjøndalen 2	1	(0)
2021–2023	Motherwell	41	(1)
2023–	Odd	36	(2)

International career
2013	Norway U18	2	(0)
- * Club domestic league appearances and goals as of 23 July 2025

Sondre Solholm Johansen (born 7 July 1995) is a Norwegian professional footballer who plays as a centre-back for Odd in the Norwegian First Division.

== Club career ==
=== Early career ===
He played youth football for Asker, Lyn through 2014 and Strømsgodset from 2015. In 2016 he was drafted into the senior squad, playing one cup game. In the first half of 2017 he was loaned out to Mjøndalen, and when the loan was about to expire the move was made permanent.

=== Motherwell ===
On 31 August 2021, Johansen moved to Scotland to join Scottish Premiership side Motherwell on a three-year contract. He made his debut for his new club on 11 September against Aberdeen.Solholm scored his first goal for the club in a 1-0 win over Dundee United On 31 January 2023, Motherwell announced the departure of Johansen to Odd for an undisclosed fee.

== International career ==
Born and raised in Norway, In 2013 Johansen represented the Norwegian U-18 team in a pair of friendlies. In December 2021 he revealed he was eligible for the Canada national team through his maternal grandmother, and would be interested in representing the nation should they approach him.

== Career statistics ==
=== Club ===
As of match played 14 January 2023

Appearances and goals by club, season and competition
Club	Season	League			National Cup		League Cup		Europe		Total	
Club	Season	Division	Apps	Goals	Apps	Goals	Apps	Goals	Apps	Goals	Apps	Goals
Strømsgodset	2016	Tippeligaen	0	0	1	0	—				1	0
Mjøndalen	2017	OBOS-ligaen	20	0	3	1	—				23	1
Mjøndalen	2018	OBOS-ligaen	29	5	3	0	—				32	5
Mjøndalen	2019	Eliteserien	28	5	4	3	—				32	8
Mjøndalen	2020	Eliteserien	30	0	0	0	—				30	0
Mjøndalen	2021	Eliteserien	15	1	0	0	—				15	1
Mjøndalen	Total		122	11	10	4	0	0	0	0	132	15
Motherwell	2021–22	Scottish Premiership	22	0	3	0	0	0	—		25	0
Motherwell	2022–23	Scottish Premiership	19	1	0	0	2	0	1	0	22	1
Motherwell	Total		41	1	3	0	2	0	1	0	47	1
Career total			163	12	14	4	2	0	1	0	180	16
