= Vamouti Diomande =

Ivorian footballer (born 1991)

Personal information
- Full name: Vamouti Diomande
- Date of birth: 20 January 1991 (age 35)
- Place of birth: Abidjan, Ivory Coast
- Position: Midfielder

Senior career*
Years	Team	Apps	(Gls)
–2011	Bingerville		
2010–2011	Sandefjord	34	(1)
2011	Hønefoss	1	(0)
2012–2020	Mjøndalen	93	(14)
2019	→ Ullensaker/Kisa (loan)	12	(1)
- * Club domestic league appearances and goals as of 4 November 2019

Vamouti Diomande (born 20 January 1991) is an Ivorian footballer who plays as a midfielder. He has previously played for First Division sides Sandefjord, Hønefoss, Ullensaker/Kisa and Mjøndalen.

== Club career ==
Born in Abidjan, Diomande joined Mjøndalen's first-team squad ahead of the 2012 season.

== Career statistics ==
As of 4 November 2019

Season	Club	Division	League		Cup		Total	
Season	Club	Division	Apps	Goals	Apps	Goals	Apps	Goals
2010	Sandefjord	Tippeligaen	23	0	4	0	27	0
2011	Sandefjord	Adeccoligaen	9	1	3	0	12	1
2011	Hønefoss	Adeccoligaen	1	0	0	0	1	0
2012	Mjøndalen	Adeccoligaen	11	1	0	0	11	1
2013	Mjøndalen	Adeccoligaen	20	4	2	0	22	4
2014	Mjøndalen	1. divisjon	30	8	3	1	33	9
2015	Mjøndalen	Tippeligaen	3	0	0	0	3	0
2016	Mjøndalen	OBOS-ligaen	3	0	0	0	3	0
2017	Mjøndalen	OBOS-ligaen	1	0	0	0	1	0
2018	Mjøndalen	OBOS-ligaen	23	1	2	0	25	1
2019	Mjøndalen	Eliteserien	2	0	1	0	3	0
2019	Ullensaker/Kisa	OBOS-ligaen	12	1	0	0	12	1
Career Total			140	16	15	1	155	17
