= Joackim Olsen Solberg =

Norwegian footballer (born 1989)

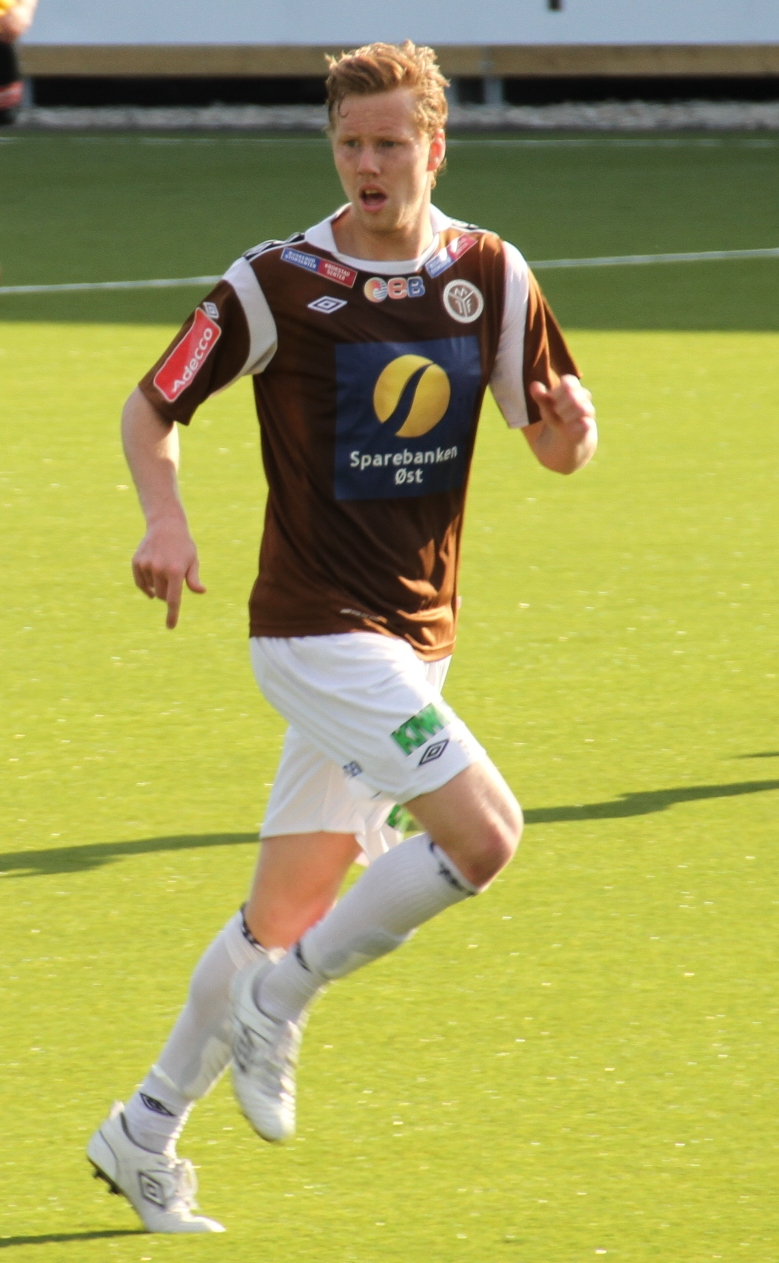
- Mjøndalen (Norway) player in match against IK Start. May 20, 2012.

Personal information
- Full name: Joackim Andreas Olsen Solberg
- Date of birth: 11 April 1989 (age 37)
- Place of birth: Krokstadelva, Norway
- Height: 1.91 m (6 ft 3 in)
- Position: Defender

Youth career
- Strømsgodset

Senior career*
Years	Team	Apps	(Gls)
2008–2016	Mjøndalen	221	(18)
2017–2018	Sandefjord	42	(3)
2018–2024	Mjøndalen	167	(8)
- * Club domestic league appearances and goals as of 14 November 2024

Joackim Andreas Olsen Solberg (born 11 April 1989) is a Norwegian former footballer who plays as a defender. Through his career he played for Mjøndalen, and Sandefjord.

Olsen Solberg was born in Krokstadelva.

== Career ==
Olsen Solberg made his debut for Mjøndalen in 2008. He transferred to Sandefjord in 2016 after 8 years at Mjøndalen. In the summer of 2018 Olsen Solberg went back to Mjøndalen.

== Career statistics ==
=== Club ===
As of match played 22 August 2022

Appearances and goals by club, season and competition
Club	Season	League			National Cup		Europe		Total	
Club	Season	Division	Apps	Goals	Apps	Goals	Apps	Goals	Apps	Goals
Mjøndalen	2009	Adeccoligaen	27	1	1	0	-		28	1
Mjøndalen	2010	Adeccoligaen	27	3	3	0	-		30	3
Mjøndalen	2011	Adeccoligaen	28	5	3	1	-		31	6
Mjøndalen	2012	Adeccoligaen	27	2	4	0	-		30	2
Mjøndalen	2013	Adeccoligaen	27	1	4	1	-		31	2
Mjøndalen	2014	1. divisjon	29	1	3	0	-		32	1
Mjøndalen	2015	Tippeligaen	28	1	4	4	-		32	5
Mjøndalen	2016	OBOS-ligaen	28	4	1	0	-		29	4
Mjøndalen	Total		221	18	23	6	-	-	244	24
Sandefjord	2017	Eliteserien	27	2	0	0	-		27	2
Sandefjord	2018	Eliteserien	15	1	2	0	-		17	1
Sandefjord	Total		42	3	2	0	-	-	44	3
Mjøndalen	2018	OBOS-ligaen	14	3	0	0	-		14	3
Mjøndalen	2019	Eliteserien	26	0	2	0	-		28	0
Mjøndalen	2020	Eliteserien	26	0	0	0	-		26	0
Mjøndalen	2021	Eliteserien	27	0	2	0	-		29	0
Mjøndalen	2022	OBOS-ligaen	19	2	1	0	-		20	2
Mjøndalen	Total		112	5	5	0	-	-	117	5
Career total			375	26	30	6	-	-	405	32
