= Pontus Silfwer =

Swedish footballer

Personal information
- Date of birth: 14 August 1991 (age 35)
- Place of birth: Sundsvall, Sweden
- Height: 1.73 m (5 ft 8 in)
- Position: Midfielder

Youth career
- Alnö
- Sundsvall

Senior career*
Years	Team	Apps	(Gls)
2010–2011	Sundsvall	25	(0)
2012	Hudiksvall	21	(8)
2013–2016	Frej	96	(6)
2017	Mjøndalen	17	(2)
2017–2019	Halmstad	51	(4)
2019	Mjøndalen	15	(0)
2020–2022	Sundsvall	73	(1)
- * Club domestic league appearances and goals

Pontus Silfwer (born 14 August 1991) is a Swedish former footballer.

Silfwer played youth football for Alnö and Sundsvall. In 2010, he was drafted into the senior squad. In 2017 he signed for Norwegian club Mjøndalen, later in 2017 Silfwer signed for Halmstad on a three and a half-year contract.

Silfwer went back to Mjøndalen in 2019.

== Career statistics ==
=== Club ===
As of match played 5 December 2020

Appearances and goals by club, season and competition
Club	Season	League			National Cup		Europe		Total	
Club	Season	Division	Apps	Goals	Apps	Goals	Apps	Goals	Apps	Goals
Sundsvall	2010	Superettan	18	0	2	0	-		20	0
Sundsvall	2011	Superettan	7	0	0	0	-		7	0
Sundsvall	Total		25	0	2	0	-	-	27	0
Hudiksvall	2012	Division 2	21	8	0	0	-		21	8
Hudiksvall	Total		21	8	0	0	-	-	21	8
Frej	2013	Division 1	25	1	3	0	-		28	1
Frej	2014	Division 1	22	2	2	0	-		24	2
Frej	2015	Superettan	20	0	1	0	-		21	0
Frej	2016	Superettan	29	3	3	0	-		32	3
Frej	Total		96	6	9	0	-	-	105	6
Mjøndalen	2017	OBOS-ligaen	17	2	2	0	-		19	2
Mjøndalen	Total		17	2	2	0	-	-	19	2
Halmstad	2017	Allsvenskan	12	1	0	0	-		12	1
Halmstad	2018	Superettan	28	3	4	2	-		32	5
Halmstad	2019	Superettan	11	0	5	0	-		16	0
Halmstad	Total		51	4	9	2	-	-	60	6
Mjøndalen	2019	Eliteserien	15	0	0	0	-		15	0
Mjøndalen	Total		15	0	0	0	-	-	15	0
Sundsvall	2020	Superettan	21	0	3	0	-		24	0
Sundsvall	Total		21	0	3	0	-	-	24	0
Career total			246	20	25	2	-	-	271	22
