= 2020 Mjøndalen IF Fotball season =

Mjøndalen
2020 season
- Manager: Vegard Hansen
- Stadium: Consto Arena
- Eliteserien: 14th
- Relegation play-offs: Winners
- Norwegian Cup: Canceled due to the COVID-19 pandemic
- Top goalscorer: League: Shuaibu Ibrahim (6); All: Shuaibu Ibrahim (6)
Home colours	Away colours

The 2020 season was Mjøndalen IF's second successive season in the Eliteserien following their promotion in 2018.

== Season events ==
On 12 June, the Norwegian Football Federation announced that a maximum of 200 home fans would be allowed to attend the upcoming seasons matches.

On 10 September, the Norwegian Football Federation cancelled the 2020 Norwegian Cup due to the COVID-19 pandemic in Norway.

On 30 September, the Minister of Culture and Gender Equality, Abid Raja, announced that clubs would be able to have crowds of 600 at games from 12 October.

== Squad ==
Note: Flags indicate national team as defined under FIFA eligibility rules; some limited exceptions apply. Players may hold more than one non-FIFA nationality.

No.	Pos.	Nation	Player
1	GK	IRN	Sosha Makani
2	DF	NED	Quint Jansen
3	MF	NOR	Vetle Dragsnes
4	DF	NOR	William Sell
5	DF	NOR	Alexander Hansen
6	DF	NOR	Joackim Solberg
7	MF	NOR	Lars Olden Larsen
8	FW	NOR	Fredrik Brustad
9	FW	NOR	Sondre Liseth
10	MF	DEN	Tonny Brochmann
11	MF	NOR	Christian Gauseth (captain)
12	DF	NOR	Markus Nakkim
14	MF	CIV	Vamouti Diomande
15	MF	NOR	Mathias Fredriksen

No.	Pos.	Nation	Player
16	MF	ISL	Dagur Þórhallsson
17	MF	NOR	Martin Ovenstad
18	FW	NOR	Andreas Hellum
20	MF	GHA	Isaac Twum
22	FW	NGA	Shuaibu Ibrahim
23	DF	NOR	Sondre Johansen
24	FW	NOR	Ole Amund Sveen
25	GK	CMR	Georges Bokwé
27	MF	NOR	Frank Bamenye
29	MF	NOR	Kristoffer Stephensen
30	MF	NOR	Aristide Sagbakken
32	GK	POR	Jorge Vieira
33	MF	NOR	Stian Aasmundsen

=== Out on loan ===
Note: Flags indicate national team as defined under FIFA eligibility rules; some limited exceptions apply. Players may hold more than one non-FIFA nationality.

No. / Pos. / Nation / Player; 19 / FW / NOR / Magnus Bækken (at Notodden)	No. / Pos. / Nation / Player; 21 / FW / NOR / Alfred Scriven (at Asker)

== Transfers ==
=== In ===
Date	Position	Nationality	Name	From	Fee	Ref.
29 January 2020	MF	(Norway)	Lars Larsen	KFUM Oslo	Undisclosed	
3 February 2020	FW	(Norway)	Magnus Bækken	Hallingdal	Undisclosed	
11 February 2020	MF	(Norway)	Kristoffer Nesse Stephensen	Øygarden	Undisclosed	
13 February 2020	GK	(Iran)	Sosha Makani	Naft Masjed Soleyman	Undisclosed	
11 March 2020	DF	(Norway)	Markus Nakkim	Vålerenga	Undisclosed	
3 June 2020	MF	(Norway)	Martin Ovenstad		Free	
13 June 2020	FW	(Nigeria)	Shuaibu Ibrahim	Haugesund	Undisclosed	
24 September 2020	MF	(Ghana)	Isaac Twum	Start	Undisclosed	
2 October 2020	FW	(Norway)	Ole Amund Sveen	Bodø/Glimt	Undisclosed	

=== Out ===
Date	Position	Nationality	Name	To	Fee	Ref.
14 December 2019	MF	(Norway)	Sebastian Temte Hansen	Notodden	Undisclosed	
20 December 2019	MF	(Sweden)	Pontus Silfwer	GIF Sundsvall	Undisclosed	
22 January 2020	FW	(Sweden)	Jacob Bergström	Mjällby	Undisclosed	
30 June 2020	DF	(Nigeria)	Akeem Latifu	Jerv	Undisclosed	

=== Loans out ===
Date from	Position	Nationality	Name	to	Date to	Ref.
13 July 2020	FW	(Norway)	Alfred Scriven	Asker	End of season	
17 July 2020	DF	(Norway)	Adrian Hansen	Fram Larvik	End of season	
17 July 2020	FW	(Norway)	Magnus Bækken	Notodden	End of season	

=== Released ===
Date	Position	Nationality	Name	Joined	Date
6 December 2019	FW	(Canada)	Olivier Occéan	Urædd	
6 December 2019	MF	(Norway)	Henrik Gulden		
6 December 2019	FW	(The Gambia)	Jibril Bojang	Masr	
31 December 2019	DF	(Norway)	Erick Sagbakken		

== Competitions ==
=== Eliteserien ===
==== Results summary ====
Overall								Home						Away					
Pld	W	D	L	GF	GA	GD	Pts	W	D	L	GF	GA	GD	W	D	L	GF	GA	GD
30	8	3	19	23	45	−22	27	6	0	8	13	17	−4	2	3	11	10	28	−18

Last updated: 22 December 2020.
Source: Results

==== Results by round ====
Round	1	2	3	4	5	6	7	8	9	10	11	12	13	14	15	16	17	18	19	20	21	22	23	24	25	26	27	28	29	30
Ground	A	H	A	H	A	A	H	A	H	A	H	A	H	A	H	A	H	A	H	A	H	A	H	H	A	H	A	H	A	H
Result	D	W	D	L	W	L	L	L	L	L	L	L	W	W	L	L	L	L	L	L	W	L	L	W	L	L	D	W	L	W
Position	11	8	7	8	5	8	10	10	11	14	14	15	14	13	14	15	15	15	15	15	15	15	15	15	15	15	15	15	15	14

Updated to match(es) played on 22 December 2020. Source: Results
A = Away; H = Home; W = Win; D = Draw; L = Loss

==== Results ====
16 June 2020 1	Stabæk	0–0	Mjøndalen	Bærum
18:00 CEST (UTC+2)	Vetlesen (yellow card) 57'	Report	Aasmundsen (yellow card) 19'; Johansen (yellow card) 62'; Hansen (yellow card) 83' (yellow-red card) 90+2'	Stadium: Nadderud Stadion; Attendance: 200; Referee: Tore Hansen
Note: Match played in-front of maximum capacity of 200 fans due to the COVID-19 pandemic in Norway.

20 June 2020 2	Mjøndalen	1–0	Sarpsborg 08	Mjøndalen
18:00 CEST (UTC+2)	Aasmundsen (yellow card) 16'; Ibrahim 25'	Report	Bojang (yellow card) 90+1'	Stadium: Consto Arena; Attendance: 200; Referee: Sigurd Smehus Kringstad
Note: Match played in-front of maximum capacity of 200 fans due to the COVID-19 pandemic in Norway.

24 June 2020 3	Viking	1–1	Mjøndalen	Stavanger
18:00 CEST (UTC+2)	Berisha (yellow card) 38' (goal) 41' (pen.); Vikstøl (yellow card) 51'; Høiland (yellow card) 85'	Report	Ibrahim 19' (yellow card) 64'; Nakkim (yellow card) 59'	Stadium: Viking Stadion; Attendance: 200; Referee: Kai Erik Steen
Note: Match played in-front of maximum capacity of 200 fans due to the COVID-19 pandemic in Norway.

28 June 2020 4	Mjøndalen	1–2	Kristiansund	Mjøndalen
18:00 CEST (UTC+2)	Ibrahim 90+2'	Report	Kalludra 50'; Pellegrino 86'	Stadium: Consto Arena; Attendance: 200; Referee: Ola Hobber Nilsen
Note: Match played in-front of maximum capacity of 200 fans due to the COVID-19 pandemic in Norway.

1 July 2020 5	Aalesund	1–3	Mjøndalen	Ålesund
18:00 CEST (UTC+2)	Haugen (yellow card) 48' (yellow-red card) 90'; Bizoza (yellow card) 60'; Castro 83' (pen.); Grønner (yellow card) 90+1'	Report	Aasmundsen (yellow card) 9'; Larsen (yellow card) 12'; Ibrahim 28'; Dragsnes 31'; Brochmann (yellow card) 41'; Liseth 90+8'	Stadium: Color Line Stadion; Attendance: 200; Referee: Sivert Amland
Note: Match played in-front of maximum capacity of 200 fans due to the COVID-19 pandemic in Norway.

5 July 2020 6	Molde	2–1	Mjøndalen	Molde
18:00 CEST (UTC+2)	Aursnes 30'; Kitolano 32'; Bjørnbak (yellow card) 68'; Pedersen (yellow card) 86'	Report	Jansen 61'; Þórhallsson (yellow card) 70'; Gauseth (penalty missed) 86'; Dragsnes (yellow card) 87'	Stadium: Aker Stadion; Attendance: 200; Referee: Sigurd Smehus Kringstad
Note: Match played in-front of maximum capacity of 200 fans due to the COVID-19 pandemic in Norway.

12 July 2020 7	Mjøndalen	0–1	Vålerenga	Mjøndalen
18:00 CEST (UTC+2)	Brustad (yellow card) 90+1'	Report	Jensen 13'; Klaesson (red card) 35'; Borchgrevink (yellow card) 55'; Haug (yellow card) 90+4'	Stadium: Consto Arena; Attendance: 200; Referee: Marius Hansen Grøtta
Note: Match played in-front of maximum capacity of 200 fans due to the COVID-19 pandemic in Norway.

15 July 2020 8	Strømsgodset	2–1	Mjøndalen	Drammen
18:00 CEST (UTC+2)	Maigaard (yellow card) 45'; Mawa 50'; Salvesen 54'; Parr (yellow card) 84'	Report	Aasmundsen (yellow card) 73'; Hellum (yellow card) 81'; Nakkim 86' (pen.)	Stadium: Marienlyst Stadion; Attendance: 200; Referee: Svein Oddvar Moen
Note: Match played in-front of maximum capacity of 200 fans due to the COVID-19 pandemic in Norway.

18 July 2020 9	Mjøndalen	2–3	Bodø/Glimt	Mjøndalen
18:00 CEST (UTC+2)	Hansen (yellow card) 45'; Brochmann 58'; Dragsnes 83'	Report	Zinckernagel 24'; Boniface 41'; Høibråten (yellow card) 43'; J.Hauge 57' (yellow card) 77'; Smits (yellow card) 90'	Stadium: Consto Arena; Attendance: 200; Referee: Tom Harald Hagen
Note: Match played in-front of maximum capacity of 200 fans due to the COVID-19 pandemic in Norway.

26 July 2020 10	Sandefjord	1–0	Mjøndalen	Sandefjord
18:00 CEST (UTC+2)	Markmanrud (yellow card) 31'; Vales (yellow card) 50'; Brenden 64'	Report	Ibrahim (yellow card) 42'	Stadium: Sandefjord Arena; Attendance: 200; Referee: Ola Hobber Nilsen
Note: Match played in-front of maximum capacity of 200 fans due to the COVID-19 pandemic in Norway.

29 July 2020 11	Mjøndalen	0–2	Odd	Mjøndalen
18:00 CEST (UTC+2)	Hansen (red card) 34'	Report	Kitolano 42', 87'	Stadium: Consto Arena; Attendance: 200; Referee: Tore Hansen
Note: Match played in-front of maximum capacity of 200 fans due to the COVID-19 pandemic in Norway.

2 August 2020 12	Start	3–0	Mjøndalen	Kristiansand
18:00 CEST (UTC+2)	Tønnessen 20'; Ramsland (yellow card) 26'; Schulze 87'; Skålevik 89'	Report		Stadium: Sør Arena; Attendance: 200; Referee: Kristoffer Hagenes
Note: Match played in-front of maximum capacity of 200 fans due to the COVID-19 pandemic in Norway.

9 August 2020 13	Mjøndalen	1–0	Haugesund	Mjøndalen
18:00 CEST (UTC+2)	Ibrahim 20'; Aasmundsen (yellow card) 69'; Solberg (yellow card) 90+3'	Report		Stadium: Consto Arena; Attendance: 200; Referee: Ola Hobber Nilsen
Note: Match played in-front of maximum capacity of 200 fans due to the COVID-19 pandemic in Norway.

16 August 2020 14	Brann	0–1	Mjøndalen	Bergen
18:00 CEST (UTC+2)		Report	Hellum 85'	Stadium: Brann Stadion; Attendance: 200; Referee: Tom Harald Hagen
Note: Match played in-front of maximum capacity of 200 fans due to the COVID-19 pandemic in Norway.

22 August 2020 15	Mjøndalen	0–2	Rosenborg	Mjøndalen
20:30 CEST (UTC+2)	Brochmann (yellow card) 82'; Makani (yellow card) 85'	Report	Tagseth (yellow card) 4'; Åsen 33'; Zachariassen 43'; Islamović (penalty missed) 77'; Hedenstad (yellow card) 86'	Stadium: Consto Arena; Attendance: 200; Referee: Espen Andreas Eskås

30 August 2020 16	Odd	6–1	Mjøndalen	Skien
18:00 CEST (UTC+2)	Ruud 6', 31' (pen.); Bakenga 14', 34'; Rashani 67'; Risa (yellow card) 77' (goal) 90+3'	Report	Brochmann 4'; Solberg (yellow card) 31'; Liseth (penalty missed) 72'; Ovenstad (yellow card) 86'	Stadium: Skagerak Arena; Attendance: 200; Referee: Kristoffer Hagenes

13 September 2020 17	Mjøndalen	0–2	Sandefjord	Mjøndalen
18:00 CEST (UTC+2)	Liseth (yellow card) 2'; Nakkim (penalty missed) 14' (yellow card) 32'; Johansen (yellow card) 76'; Larsen (yellow card) 85'	Report	Jónsson (yellow card) 27' (goal) 33'; Grorud (yellow card) 45'; Gussiås 53'; Pálsson (yellow card) 72'; Celorrio (yellow card) 90+5'	Stadium: Consto Arena; Attendance: 200; Referee: Sigurd Smehus Kringstad

19 September 2020 18	Sarpsborg 08	2–0	Mjøndalen	Sarpsborg
20:30 CEST (UTC+2)	Abdellaoue 5' (pen.); Heintz (yellow card) 33'; Halvorsen (yellow card) 36' (goal) 42'; Adéoti (yellow card) 82'	Report		Stadium: Sarpsborg Stadion; Attendance: 200; Referee: Dag Vidar Hafsås

27 September 2020 19	Mjøndalen	1–2	Viking	Mjøndalen
18:00 CEST (UTC+2)	Liseth 4'; Ovenstad (yellow card) 43'	Report	Bytyqi 35'; Høiland 69'; Heggheim (yellow card) 88'	Stadium: Consto Arena; Attendance: 200; Referee: Tommy Skjerven

3 October 2020 20	Vålerenga	4–1	Mjøndalen	Oslo
20:30 CEST (UTC+2)	Finne 45', 75'; Bjørdal 67', 68'	Report	Twum (yellow card) 21'; Tollås 61' (o.g.)	Stadium: Intility Arena; Attendance: 200; Referee: Sivert Amland

17 October 2020 21	Mjøndalen	2–0	Brann	Mjøndalen
18:00 CEST (UTC+2)	Ovenstad 13'; Twum 37' (yellow card) 66'; Liseth (yellow card) 90+3'	Report	Kristiansen (yellow card) 29'; Grøgaard (yellow card) 90+6'	Stadium: Consto Arena; Attendance: 600; Referee: Tom Harald Hagen

25 October 2020 22	Bodø/Glimt	2–0	Mjøndalen	Bodø
18:00 CET (UTC+1)	Junker 16' (pen.), 68' (yellow card) 26'	Report	Johansen (yellow card) 6'; Sveen (yellow card) 15'; Liseth (yellow card) 49'; Larsen (yellow card) 76'; Gauseth (yellow card) 84'	Stadium: Aspmyra Stadion; Attendance: 600; Referee: Marius Hansen Grøtta

1 November 2020 23	Mjøndalen	1–3	Molde	Mjøndalen
18:00 CET (UTC+1)	Brustad (yellow card) 26' (goal) 38'; Ovenstad (yellow card) 71'	Report	Gregersen (yellow card) 52'; Omoijuanfo (yellow card) 60'; James (yellow card) 67' (goal) 80' (pen.); Ellingsen 76', 87'	Stadium: Consto Arena; Attendance: 600; Referee: Espen Eskås

7 November 2020 24	Mjøndalen	3–0	Strømsgodset	Mjøndalen
18:00 CET (UTC+1)	Sveen 4'; Ovenstad (yellow card) 6'; Brustad 58'; Aasmundsen 84'; Solberg (yellow card) 87'	Report	Vilsvik (yellow card) 27'; Stengel (yellow card) 87'	Stadium: Consto Arena; Attendance: 200; Referee: Tore Hansen

22 November 2020 25	Kristiansund	1–0	Mjøndalen	Kristiansund
18:00 CET (UTC+1)	D.Ulvestad 3'	Report	Eriksen (yellow card) 66'; Nakkim (yellow card) 90+2'	Stadium: Kristiansund Stadion; Attendance: 600; Referee: Dag Vidar Hafsås

29 November 2020 26	Mjøndalen	0–1	Stabæk	Mjøndalen
18:00 CET (UTC+1)		Report	Bohinen 1'; Amankwah (yellow card) 45'; Jenssen (yellow card) 79'; Sandberg (yellow card) 82'	Stadium: Consto Arena; Attendance: 200; Referee: Sigurd Smehus Kringstad

2 December 2020 27	Haugesund	1–1	Mjøndalen	Haugesund
18:00 CET (UTC+1)	Desler (yellow card) 20'; Velde (yellow card) 40'; Koné (yellow card) 65'; Sandvik (yellow card) 80'; Knudsen 88'	Report	Aasmundsen (yellow card) 17'; Eriksen (yellow card) 61'; Ovenstad (yellow card) 63'; Liseth 67' (yellow card) 74'; Makani (red card) 79'; Vieira (yellow card) 84'	Stadium: Haugesund Stadion; Attendance: 600; Referee: Kai Erik Steen

6 December 2020 28	Mjøndalen	1–0	Start	Mjøndalen
17:00 CET (UTC+1)	Twum (yellow card) 25'; Ibrahim 48'; Jansen (yellow card) 87'	Report		Stadium: Consto Arena; Attendance: 200; Referee: Tom Harald Hagen

10 December 2020 29	Rosenborg	1–0	Mjøndalen	Trondheim
18:00 CET (UTC+1)	Zachariassen 90+5'	Report		Stadium: Lerkendal Stadion; Attendance: 0 Referee: Tore Hansen

22 December 2020 30	Mjøndalen	3-0	Aalesund	Mjøndalen
18:00 CET (UTC+1)	Liseth 13'; Nakkim 17'; Gauseth 45+4' (pen.); Sveen (yellow card) 73'; Aasmundsen (yellow card) 87'	Report	Karamoko (yellow card) 39'; Hatlehol (yellow card) 60'	Stadium: Consto Arena; Attendance: 200; Referee: Dag Vidar Hafsås

==== Table ====
Pos	Team	Pld	W	D	L	GF	GA	GD	Pts	Qualification or relegation
12	Sarpsborg 08	30	8	8	14	33	43	−10	32	
13	Strømsgodset	30	7	10	13	41	57	−16	31	
14	Mjøndalen (O)	30	8	3	19	26	45	−19	27	Qualification for the relegation play-offs
15	Start (R)	30	6	9	15	33	56	−23	27	Relegation to First Division
16	Aalesund (R)	30	2	5	23	30	85	−55	11	Relegation to First Division

Source: Football Association of Norway (in Norwegian)
Rules for classification: 1) Points; 2) Goal difference; 3) Goals scored; 4) Head-to-head points; 5) Head-to-head goal difference; 6) Head-to-head away goals scored (only if between two teams); 7) Head-to-head goals scored; 8) Play-off (only used to decide champions or relegation).
(O) Play-off winners; (R) Relegated

==== Relegation playoffs ====
28 December 2020	Mjøndalen	3–2	Sogndal	Oslo
17:00 CET (UTC+1)	Sveen 9', 88'; Aasmundsen (yellow card) 39'; Liseth (yellow card) 58'; Nakkim 90+7'	Report	Kupen (yellow card) 38'; A.Adams 79' (pen.); T.Kristoffersen 80'	Stadium: Intility Arena; Attendance: 200; Referee: Tom Harald Hagen

=== Norwegian Cup ===
2020 First round	–
CEST (UTC+2)
Note: Cup cancelled on 10 September due to the COVID-19 pandemic in Norway.

== Squad statistics ==
As of match played 28 December 2020

=== Appearances and goals ===
No.	Pos	Nat	Player	Total		Eliteserien		Relegation play-offs		Norwegian Cup	
No.	Pos	Nat	Player	Apps	Goals	Apps	Goals	Apps	Goals	Apps	Goals
1	GK	(Iran) IRN	Sosha Makani	29	0	28	0	1	0	0	0
2	DF	(Netherlands) NED	Quint Jansen	15	1	4+11	1	0	0	0	0
3	MF	(Norway) NOR	Vetle Dragsnes	31	2	30	2	1	0	0	0
4	DF	(Norway) NOR	William Sell	14	0	5+9	0	0	0	0	0
5	DF	(Norway) NOR	Alexander Hansen	18	0	12+6	0	0	0	0	0
6	DF	(Norway) NOR	Joackim Solberg	25	0	13+12	0	0	0	0	0
7	MF	(Norway) NOR	Lars Larsen	28	0	18+9	0	0+1	0	0	0
8	FW	(Norway) NOR	Fredrik Brustad	31	2	22+8	2	0+1	0	0	0
9	FW	(Norway) NOR	Sondre Liseth	29	4	21+7	4	1	0	0	0
10	MF	(Denmark) DEN	Tonny Brochmann	21	2	16+5	2	0	0	0	0
11	MF	(Norway) NOR	Christian Gauseth	19	1	12+6	1	1	0	0	0
12	DF	(Norway) NOR	Markus Nakkim	31	3	30	2	1	1	0	0
15	MF	(Norway) NOR	Mathias Fredriksen	1	0	0+1	0	0	0	0	0
16	MF	(Iceland) ISL	Dagur Þórhallsson	13	0	1+12	0	0	0	0	0
17	MF	(Norway) NOR	Martin Ovenstad	26	1	13+12	1	1	0	0	0
18	MF	(Norway) NOR	Andreas Hellum	16	1	1+15	1	0	0	0	0
20	MF	(Ghana) GHA	Isaac Twum	11	1	9+2	1	0	0	0	0
22	FW	(Nigeria) NGA	Shuaibu Ibrahim	27	6	20+6	6	1	0	0	0
23	DF	(Norway) NOR	Sondre Johansen	31	0	29+1	0	1	0	0	0
24	FW	(Norway) NOR	Ole Sveen	10	3	9	1	1	2	0	0
25	GK	(Cameroon) CMR	Georges Bokwé	1	0	0+1	0	0	0	0	0
26	MF	(Norway) NOR	Syver Eriksen	13	0	11+1	0	1	0	0	0
27	MF	(Norway) NOR	Frank Bamenye	4	0	0+4	0	0	0	0	0
31	FW	(Norway) NOR	Erik Stavås Skistad	1	0	0+1	0	0	0	0	0
32	GK	(Portugal) POR	Jorge Vieira	3	0	2+1	0	0	0	0	0
33	MF	(Norway) NOR	Stian Aasmundsen	28	1	24+3	1	1	0	0	0
	FW	(Norway) NOR	Gustav Helling	2	0	0+2	0	0	0	0	0
Players away from Mjøndalen on loan:
21	FW	(Norway) NOR	Alfred Scriven	1	0	0+1	0	0	0	0	0
Players who left Mjøndalen during the season

=== Goal scorers ===
Place	Position	Nation	Number	Name	Eliteserien	Relegation play-offs	Norwegian Cup	Total
1	FW	(Nigeria)	22	Shuaibu Ibrahim	6	0	0	6
2	FW	(Norway)	9	Sondre Liseth	4	0	0	4
3	DF	(Norway)	12	Markus Nakkim	2	1	0	3
3	FW	(Norway)	24	Ole Sveen	1	2	0	3
5	MF	(Norway)	3	Vetle Dragsnes	2	0	0	2
5	MF	(Denmark)	10	Tonny Brochmann	2	0	0	2
5	FW	(Norway)	8	Fredrik Brustad	2	0	0	2
8	DF	(Netherlands)	2	Quint Jansen	1	0	0	1
8	FW	(Norway)	18	Andreas Hellum	1	0	0	1
8	MF	(Norway)	17	Martin Ovenstad	1	0	0	1
8	MF	(Ghana)	20	Isaac Twum	1	0	0	1
8	MF	(Norway)	33	Stian Aasmundsen	1	0	0	1
8	MF	(Norway)	11	Christian Gauseth	1	0	0	1
8				Own goal	1	0	0	1
				TOTALS	26	3	0	29

=== Clean sheets ===
Place	Position	Nation	Number	Name	Eliteserien	Relegation play-offs	Norwegian Cup	Total
1	GK	(Iran)	1	Sosha Makani	7	0	0	7
2	GK	(Portugal)	32	Jorge Vieira	1	0	0	1
				TOTALS	8	0	0	8

=== Disciplinary record ===
Number	Nation	Position	Name	Eliteserien		Relegation play-offs		Norwegian Cup		Total	
Number	Nation	Position	Name	Booked	Sent off (straight red)	Booked	Sent off (straight red)	Booked	Sent off (straight red)	Booked	Sent off (straight red)
1	(Iran)	GK	Sosha Makani	1	1	0	0	0	0	1	1
2	(Netherlands)	DF	Quint Jansen	1	0	0	0	0	0	1	0
3	(Norway)	MF	Vetle Dragsnes	1	0	0	0	0	0	1	0
5	(Norway)	DF	Alexander Hansen	3	2	0	0	0	0	3	2
6	(Norway)	DF	Joackim Solberg	3	0	0	0	0	0	3	0
7	(Norway)	MF	Lars Larsen	3	0	0	0	0	0	3	0
8	(Norway)	FW	Fredrik Brustad	2	0	0	0	0	0	2	0
9	(Norway)	FW	Sondre Liseth	4	0	1	0	0	0	5	0
10	(Denmark)	MF	Tonny Brochmann	2	0	0	0	0	0	2	0
11	(Norway)	MF	Christian Gauseth	1	0	0	0	0	0	1	0
12	(Norway)	DF	Markus Nakkim	3	0	0	0	0	0	3	0
16	(Iceland)	MF	Dagur Þórhallsson	1	0	0	0	0	0	1	0
17	(Norway)	MF	Martin Ovenstad	5	0	0	0	0	0	5	0
18	(Norway)	FW	Andreas Hellum	1	0	0	0	0	0	1	0
20	(Ghana)	MF	Isaac Twum	3	0	0	0	0	0	3	0
22	(Nigeria)	FW	Shuaibu Ibrahim	2	0	0	0	0	0	2	0
23	(Norway)	DF	Sondre Johansen	3	0	0	0	0	0	3	0
24	(Norway)	FW	Ole Sveen	2	0	0	0	0	0	2	0
26	(Norway)	MF	Syver Eriksen	2	0	0	0	0	0	2	0
32	(Portugal)	GK	Jorge Vieira	1	0	0	0	0	0	1	0
33	(Norway)	MF	Stian Aasmundsen	7	0	1	0	0	0	8	0
Players who left Mjøndalen during the season:
			TOTALS	51	3	2	0	0	0	53	3
