= 2020 FK Bodø/Glimt season =

Bodø/Glimt
2020 season
- President: Hege Leirfall Ingebrigtsen
- Manager: Kjetil Knutsen
- Stadium: Aspmyra Stadion
- Eliteserien: 1st
- Norwegian Cup: Cancelled (due to COVID-19 pandemic)
- UEFA Europa League: Third qualifying round (vs. Milan)
- Top goalscorer: League: Kasper Junker (27); All: Kasper Junker (28)
Home colours	Away colours

The 2020 season was Bodø/Glimt's third season back in the Eliteserien since their relegation at the end of the 2016 season. They finished as champions of the Eliteserien for the first time, and in turn qualified for the UEFA Champions League for the first time, whilst the Norwegian Cup was cancelled due to the COVID-19 pandemic in Norway. In Europe, Bodø/Glimt reached the Third Qualifying Round of the Europa League where they were knocked out by Milan.

== Season events ==
On 12 June, the Norwegian Football Federation announced that a maximum of 200 home fans would be allowed to attend the upcoming seasons matches.

In June, Bodø/Glimt registered former goalkeeper, and current goalkeeping coach, Jonas Ueland Kolstad as a backup goalkeeper whilst waiting for new signing Joshua Smits to pass through the quarantine procedure for COVID-19 pandemic in Norway.

On 10 September, the Norwegian Football Federation cancelled the 2020 Norwegian Cup due to COVID-19 pandemic in Norway.

On 30 September, the Minister of Culture and Gender Equality, Abid Raja, announced that clubs would be able to have crowds of 600 at games from 12 October.

On 22 November, Bodø/Glimt defeated Strømsgodset 2-1 to clinch their first ever Eliteserien title.

== Squad ==
As of match played 19 December 2020

No.	Name	Nationality	Position	Date of birth (age)	Signed from	Signed in	Contract ends	Apps.	Goals
Goalkeepers
1	Joshua Smits	(Netherlands)	GK	6 November 1992 (age 33)	Almere City	2020		10	0
12	Nikita Khaykin	(Russia)	GK	11 July 1995 (age 31)	Hapoel Kfar Saba	2019		26	0
25	Marcus Andersen	(Norway)	GK	29 May 2001 (age 25)	Youth team	2019		0	0
39	Sivert Hagen Jarmund	(Norway)	GK	15 February 2001 (age 25)	Youth team	2018		0	0
Defenders
2	Marius Lode	(Norway)	DF	11 March 1993 (age 33)	Bryne	2017		107	1
3	Alfons Sampsted	(Iceland)	DF	6 April 1998 (age 28)	IFK Norrköping	2020		32	0
4	Marius Høibråten	(Norway)	DF	23 January 1995 (age 31)	Sandefjord	2020		31	1
5	Fredrik André Bjørkan	(Norway)	DF	21 August 1998 (age 27)	Youth team	2016		89	6
6	Isak Amundsen	(Norway)	DF	14 October 1999 (age 26)	Brønnøysund	2020	2021	10	0
18	Brede Moe	(Norway)	DF	15 December 1991 (age 34)	Rosenborg	2015		57	2
24	Aleksander Foosnæs	(Norway)	DF	5 June 1994 (age 32)	Ranheim	2020		9	0
Midfielders
7	Patrick Berg	(Norway)	MF	24 November 1997 (age 28)	Youth team	2014		128	9
14	Ulrik Saltnes	(Norway)	MF	10 November 1992 (age 33)	Brønnøysund	2011		212	46
16	Morten Konradsen	(Norway)	MF	3 May 1996 (age 30)	Rosenborg	2018		116	12
20	Hugo Vetlesen	(Norway)	MF	29 February 2000 (age 26)	Stabæk	2020	2023	8	1
22	Vegard Moberg	(Norway)	MF	23 January 1991 (age 35)	Silkeborg	2020	2020	83	13
23	Elias Hagen	(Norway)	MF	20 January 2000 (age 26)	Grorud	2020		8	0
31	Kent Malic Swaleh	(Norway)	MF	29 March 2003 (age 23)	Youth team	2020		0	0
35	Adan Abadala Hussein	(Norway)	MF	13 October 2002 (age 23)	Youth team	2020		1	0
37	Ask Tjaerandsen-Skau	(Norway)	MF	14 January 2001 (age 25)	Youth team	2018		3	1
Forwards
8	Victor Boniface	(Nigeria)	FW	23 December 2000 (age 25)	Real Sapphire	2019		35	9
10	Philip Zinckernagel	(Denmark)	FW	16 December 1994 (age 31)	SønderjyskE	2018		89	35
15	Runar Hauge	(Norway)	FW	1 September 2001 (age 24)	Youth team	2017		13	0
17	Sebastian Tounekti	(Norway)	FW	13 July 2002 (age 24)	Tromsdalen	2020		10	2
19	Sondre Brunstad Fet	(Norway)	FW	17 January 1997 (age 29)	loan from Aalesund	2020		29	5
21	Kasper Junker	(Denmark)	FW	5 March 1994 (age 32)	AC Horsens	2020		26	28
22	Ole Sveen	(Norway)	FW	5 January 1990 (age 36)	Sogndal	2019		20	1
26	Ola Solbakken	(Norway)	FW	7 September 1998 (age 27)	Ranheim	2020		24	3
32	Elias Hoff Melkersen	(Norway)	FW	31 December 2002 (age 23)	Youth team	2019		1	0
33	Mads Halsøy	(Norway)	FW	28 March 2002 (age 24)	Youth team	2020		0	0
34	Tobias Lillevold Johnsen	(Norway)	FW	29 April 2000 (age 26)	Youth team	2018		1	0
Out on loan
Players who left club during season
11	Jens Petter Hauge	(Norway)	MF	12 October 1999 (age 26)	Youth team	2016		118	35
12	Jonas Ueland Kolstad	(Norway)	GK	21 September 1976 (age 49)	Coaching staff	2020		81	0
20	Sammy Skytte	(Denmark)	MF	20 February 1997 (age 29)	Midtjylland	2020		11	1
	Amadou Konaté	(France)	FW	1 January 1997 (age 29)	Boulogne	2019		5	3

== Transfers ==
=== In ===
Date	Position	Nationality	Name	From	Fee	Ref.
17 December 2019	FW	(Denmark)	Kasper Junker	Horsens	Undisclosed	
18 December 2019	FW	(Norway)	Ola Solbakken	Ranheim	Undisclosed	
8 January 2020	DF	(Norway)	Aleksander Foosnæs	Ranheim	Undisclosed	
18 February 2020	DF	(Norway)	Isak Amundsen	Brønnøysund	Undisclosed	
20 February 2020	DF	(Iceland)	Alfons Sampsted	IFK Norrköping	Undisclosed	
25 February 2020	MF	(Denmark)	Sammy Skytte	Midtjylland	Undisclosed	
30 March 2020	FW	(Norway)	Sebastian Tounekti	Tromsdalen	Undisclosed	
27 May 2020	DF	(Norway)	Marius Høibråten	Sandefjord	Undisclosed	
11 June 2020	MF	(Norway)	Elias Hagen	Grorud	Undisclosed	
12 June 2020	GK	(Norway)	Jonas Ueland Kolstad	Coaching staff		
12 June 2020	GK	(Netherlands)	Joshua Smits	Almere City	Undisclosed	
29 May 2020	MF	(Norway)	Sondre Brunstad Fet	Aalesund	Undisclosed	
5 October 2020	MF	(Norway)	Vegard Leikvoll Moberg	Silkeborg	Undisclosed	
5 October 2020	MF	(Norway)	Hugo Vetlesen	Stabæk	Undisclosed	

=== Out ===
Date	Position	Nationality	Name	To	Fee	Ref.
1 January 2020	MF	(Norway)	Håkon Evjen	AZ Alkmaar	Undisclosed	
6 January 2020	DF	(Norway)	Andreas van der Spa	Øygarden	Undisclosed	
10 January 2020	MF	(Norway)	Vegard Leikvoll Moberg	Silkeborg	Undisclosed	
14 January 2020	MF	(Iceland)	Oliver Sigurjónsson	Breiðablik	Undisclosed	
31 January 2020	GK	(Brazil)	Ricardo Friedrich	MKE Ankaragücü	Undisclosed	
7 February 2020	FW	(Norway)	Adrian Skindlo	Junkeren	Undisclosed	
12 February 2020	MF	(Norway)	Casper Øyvann	Tromsdalen	Undisclosed	
25 May 2020	FW	(Norway)	Endre Kupen	Sogndal	Undisclosed	
28 May 2020	DF	(Norway)	Vegard Bergan	IK Start	Undisclosed	
4 June 2020	FW	(Norway)	William Moan Mikalsen	HamKam	Undisclosed	
21 August 2020	FW	(France)	Amadou Konaté	Cholet	Undisclosed	
11 September 2020	MF	(Denmark)	Sammy Skytte	Stabæk	Undisclosed	
1 October 2020	MF	(Norway)	Jens Petter Hauge	A.C. Milan	Undisclosed	
2 October 2020	FW	(Norway)	Ole Amund Sveen	Mjøndalen	Undisclosed	

=== Loans out ===
Date from	Position	Nationality	Name	To	Date to	Ref.
4 February 2020	FW	(France)	Amadou Konaté	Sporting Club Lyon	30 June 2020	
10 July 2020	MF	(Norway)	Runar Hauge	Grorud	End of 2020 season	

=== Released ===
Date	Position	Nationality	Name	Joined	Date	Ref.
31 December 2019	DF	(Spain)	José Isidoro	Retired		
26 June 2020	GK	(Norway)	Jonas Ueland Kolstad	Retired		
31 December 2020	MF	(Denmark)	Philip Zinckernagel	Watford	2 January 2021	

== Competitions ==
=== Overview ===
Competition	First match	Last match	Starting round	Final position	Record							
Competition	First match	Last match	Starting round	Final position	Pld	W	D	L	GF	GA	GD	Win %
Eliteserien	16 June 2020	19 December 2020	Matchday 1	Winners	30	26	3	1	103	32	+71	86.67
UEFA Europa League	27 August 2020	24 September 2020	First qualifying round	Third qualifying round	3	2	0	1	11	5	+6	66.67
Total					33	28	3	2	114	37	+77	84.85

Last updated: 19 December 2020
Source: Competitions

=== Eliteserien ===
==== League table ====
Pos	Team	Pld	W	D	L	GF	GA	GD	Pts	Qualification or relegation
1	Bodø/Glimt (C)	30	26	3	1	103	32	+71	81	Qualification for the Champions League first qualifying round
2	Molde	30	20	2	8	77	36	+41	62	Qualification for the Europa Conference League second qualifying round
3	Vålerenga	30	15	10	5	51	33	+18	55	Qualification for the Europa Conference League second qualifying round
4	Rosenborg	30	15	7	8	50	35	+15	52	Qualification for the Europa Conference League second qualifying round
5	Kristiansund	30	12	12	6	57	45	+12	48	

Source: Football Association of Norway (in Norwegian)
Rules for classification: 1) Points; 2) Goal difference; 3) Goals scored; 4) Head-to-head points; 5) Head-to-head goal difference; 6) Head-to-head away goals scored (only if between two teams); 7) Head-to-head goals scored; 8) Play-off (only used to decide champions or relegation).
(C) Champions

==== Results summary ====
Overall								Home						Away					
Pld	W	D	L	GF	GA	GD	Pts	W	D	L	GF	GA	GD	W	D	L	GF	GA	GD
30	26	3	1	103	32	+71	81	15	0	0	59	11	+48	11	3	1	44	21	+23

Last updated: 19 December 2020.
Source: see below

==== Results by match ====
Match	1	2	3	4	5	6	7	8	9	10	11	12	13	14	15	16	17	18	19	20	21	22	23	24	25	26	27	28	29	30
Ground	A	H	A	H	A	H	A	H	A	H	A	H	A	A	H	A	H	A	H	H	A	H	A	H	A	H	A	H	A	H
Result	W	W	W	W	W	W	W	W	W	W	D	W	D	W	W	W	W	W	W	W	L	W	W	W	W	W	D	W	W	W
Position	2	1	1	1	1	1	1	1	1	1	1	1	1	1	1	1	1	1	1	1	1	1	1	1	1	1	1	1	1	1

Updated to match(es) played on 19 December 2020. Source: see below
A = Away; H = Home; W = Win; D = Draw; L = Loss

==== Results ====
16 June 2020 1	Viking	2–4	Bodø/Glimt	Stavanger
18:00 CEST (UTC+2)	Torsteinbø 21'; Østensen 42' (yellow card) 45+1'	Report	Saltnes 27'; Berg (yellow card) 44'; J.Hauge (yellow card) 54' (goal) 57'; Fet 69'; Zinckernagel 80'	Stadium: Viking Stadion; Attendance: 200; Referee: Kristoffer Hagenes
Note: Match played in-front of maximum capacity of 200 fans due to the COVID-19 pandemic in Norway.

21 June 2020 2	Bodø/Glimt	6–1	Haugesund	Bodø
18:00 CEST (UTC+2)	Berg 16'; Junker 23', 45', 49'; J.Hauge 51'; Foosnæs (yellow card) 87'; Skytte 90'	Report	Leite (yellow card) 32'; Sandberg 79' (pen.)	Stadium: Aspmyra Stadion; Attendance: 200; Referee: Marius Grøtta

25 June 2020 3	Rosenborg	2–3	Bodø/Glimt	Trondheim
20:30 CEST (UTC+2)	Meling (red card) 52'; Islamović (yellow card) 60'; Bjørkan 66' (o.g.); Helland (yellow card) 80'; Trondsen 82'	Report	Zinckernagel 22' (pen.); Saltnes (yellow card) 81'; Junker 87'; Solbakken 90'; Bjørkan (yellow card) 90+1'	Stadium: Lerkendal Stadion; Attendance: 200; Referee: Tom Harald Hagen

28 June 2020 4	Bodø/Glimt	2–1	Sarpsborg 08	Bodø
18:00 CEST (UTC+2)	J.Hauge 32'; Saltnes 58'	Report	Bojang (yellow card) 15'; Halvorsen 54'; Ødegaard (yellow card) 90+3'	Stadium: Aspmyra Stadion; Attendance: 200; Referee: Mohammad Aslam

1 July 2020 5	Odd	0–4	Bodø/Glimt	Skien
18:00 CEST (UTC+2)	Ruud (red card) 15'	Report	Zinckernagel 16' (pen.); Junker 26'; Høibråten 47' (yellow card) 69'; Skytte 66'	Stadium: Skagerak Arena; Attendance: 200; Referee: Marius Grøtta

5 July 2020 6	Bodø/Glimt	5–0	Brann	Bodø
18:00 CEST (UTC+2)	Junker 7', 12', 54'; Zinckernagel 32' (pen.); Saltnes 34'	Report	Ordagić (yellow card) 41'	Stadium: Aspmyra Stadion; Attendance: 200; Referee: Espen Eskås

12 July 2020 7	Aalesunds	1–6	Bodø/Glimt	Ålesund
18:00 CEST (UTC+2)	Friðjónsson 30' (yellow card) 33'; Grétarsson (yellow card) 48'	Report	Zinckernagel 14', 55'; Fet 32'; J.Hauge 35'; Bjørkan (yellow card) 40'; Saltnes 52'; Boniface 69'	Stadium: Color Line Stadion; Attendance: 200; Referee: Tore Hansen

15 July 2020 8	Bodø/Glimt	2–1	Kristiansund	Bodø
18:00 CEST (UTC+2)	Skytte (yellow card) 55'; Berg 58'; Zinckernagel (yellow card) 71'; Lode (yellow card) 82'	Report	Diop (yellow card) 19'; Pellegrino 35'	Stadium: Aspmyra Stadion; Attendance: 200; Referee: Kai Erik Steen

18 July 2020 9	Mjøndalen	2–3	Bodø/Glimt	Mjøndalen
18:00 CEST (UTC+2)	Hansen (yellow card) 45'; Brochmann 58'; Dragsnes 83'	Report	Zinckernagel 24'; Boniface 41'; Høibråten (yellow card) 43'; J.Hauge 57' (yellow card) 77'; Smits (yellow card) 90'	Stadium: Consto Arena; Attendance: 200; Referee: Tom Harald Hagen

26 July 2020 10	Bodø/Glimt	3–1	Molde	Bodø
18:00 CEST (UTC+2)	Berg 25'; Lode (yellow card) 52'; Junker 65'; J.Hauge 71'	Report	Omoijuanfo 9'; Bjørnbak (yellow card) 24'	Stadium: Aspmyra Stadion; Attendance: 200; Referee: Tore Hansen

30 July 2020 11	Stabæk	2–2	Bodø/Glimt	Bærum
18:00 CEST (UTC+2)	Solheim 23'; Hanche-Olsen (yellow card) 45'; Edvardsen (yellow card) 54'; Hansen 61'	Report	Saltnes 12'; Junker 18'; Zinckernagel (yellow card) 42'; Fet (yellow card) 53'; Lode (yellow card) 66'	Stadium: Nadderud Stadion; Attendance: 200; Referee: Sigurd Smehus Kringstad

2 August 2020 12	Bodø/Glimt	3–2	Strømsgodset	Bodø
18:00 CEST (UTC+2)	Zinckernagel 12'; Mickelson 28' (o.g.); J.Hauge 67'; Boniface (yellow card) 85'	Report	Mawa 13' (yellow card) 90+1'; Hove (yellow card) 24'; Tokstad 66'; Mickelson (yellow card) 69'	Stadium: Aspmyra Stadion; Attendance: 200; Referee: Marius Grøtta

8 August 2020 13	Vålerenga	2–2	Bodø/Glimt	Oslo
18:00 CEST (UTC+2)	Vilhjálmsson 1'; Borchgrevink (yellow card) 69'; Dønnum 75'; Lekven (yellow card) 90+1'	Report	J.Hauge 35'; Junker 45' (yellow card) 63'; Fet (yellow card) 78'	Stadium: Intility Arena; Attendance: 200; Referee: Kai Erik Steen

16 August 2020 14	Sandefjord	1–2	Bodø/Glimt	Sandefjord
18:00 CEST (UTC+2)	Rufo (yellow card) 40'; Gussiås 49'; Vales (yellow card) 60'; Kurtovic (yellow card) 77'	Report	Boniface 16' (yellow card) 87'; Saltnes 78'	Stadium: Sandefjord Arena; Attendance: 200; Referee: Dag Vidar Hafsås

22 August 2020 15	Bodø/Glimt	6–0	Start	Bodø
18:00 CEST (UTC+2)	Boniface 17', 60'; Berg 35'; J.Hauge 53' (pen.), 56'; Zinckernagel 54'	Report		Stadium: Aspmyra Stadion; Attendance: 200; Referee: Tommy Skjerven

30 August 2020 16	Sarpsborg 08	0–3	Bodø/Glimt	Sarpsborg
18:00 CEST (UTC+2)	Næss (yellow card) 33'; Lindseth (yellow card) 71'; Coulibaly (yellow card) 88'	Report	Zinckernagel 44', 76'; J.Hauge 70' (pen.)	Stadium: Sarpsborg Stadion; Attendance: 200; Referee: Espen Eskås

13 September 2020 17	Bodø/Glimt	6–1	Odd	Bodø
18:00 CEST (UTC+2)	Lode (yellow card) 12'; Rossbach 14' (o.g.); Fet (yellow card) 21'; J.Hauge 26' (pen.), 42' (pen.); Saltnes 31', 58'; Boniface 56'	Report	Lunding 1'; Risa (yellow card) 55'	Stadium: Aspmyra Stadion; Attendance: 200; Referee: Kai Erik Steen

20 September 2020 18	Brann	1–3	Bodø/Glimt	Bergen
18:00 CEST (UTC+2)	Barmen (yellow card) 45'; Grøgaard 78'	Report	Fet (yellow card) 19'; Zinckernagel 51', 67'; J.Hauge 71'; Boniface (yellow card) 90+2'	Stadium: Brann Stadion; Attendance: 200; Referee: Rohit Saggi

27 September 2020 19	Bodø/Glimt	2–0	Vålerenga	Bodø
20:30 CEST (UTC+2)	Junker 19'; Zinckernagel 38' (yellow card) 82'; J.Hauge (penalty missed) 47'; Lode (red card) 66'; Boniface (yellow card) 90+1'	Report	Dønnum (yellow card) 45+3'; Klaesson (yellow card) 47'	Stadium: Aspmyra Stadion; Attendance: 200; Referee: Tore Hansen

4 October 2020 20	Bodø/Glimt	2–1	Sandefjord	Bodø
18:00 CEST (UTC+2)	Fet 1'; Saltnes 29'	Report	Markmanrud 39'	Stadium: Aspmyra Stadion; Attendance: 200; Referee: Kristoffer Hagenes

17 October 2020 21	Molde	4–2	Bodø/Glimt	Molde
20:30 CEST (UTC+2)	Eikrem 32', 52'; Aursnes (yellow card) 41'; Omoijuanfo 44'; Hestad 47' (yellow card) 58'; Pedersen (yellow card) 49'; Gregersen (yellow card) 86'	Report	Tounekti 30'; Saltnes (yellow card) 51'; Moberg 62' (yellow card) 73'; Junker (yellow card) 90+3'	Stadium: Aker Stadion; Attendance: 600; Referee: Kai Erik Steen

25 October 2020 22	Bodø/Glimt	2–0	Mjøndalen	Bodø
18:00 CET (UTC+1)	Junker 16' (pen.), 68' (yellow card) 26'	Report	Johansen (yellow card) 6'; Sveen (yellow card) 15'; Liseth (yellow card) 49'; Larsen (yellow card) 76'; Gauseth (yellow card) 84'	Stadium: Aspmyra Stadion; Attendance: 600; Referee: Marius Grøtta

1 November 2020 23	Kristiansund	2–3	Bodø/Glimt	Kristiansund
18:00 CET (UTC+1)	Pellegrino 5' (yellow card) 6'; Coly (yellow card) 33'; Bye 79'	Report	Moberg 29'; Junker 48' (pen.), 89'; Berg (yellow card) 51'	Stadium: Kristiansund Stadion; Attendance: 600; Referee: Marius Grøtta

8 November 2020 24	Bodø/Glimt	7–0	Aalesunds	Bodø
18:00 CET (UTC+1)	Vetlesen (yellow card) 28' (goal) 38'; Saltnes 44', 56'; Solbakken 70'; Junker 81', 90+3'; Bjørkan 90'	Report		Stadium: Aspmyra Stadion; Attendance: 600; Referee: Dag Vidar Hafsås

22 November 2020 25	Strømsgodset	1–2	Bodø/Glimt	Drammen
18:00 CET (UTC+1)	Ingimundarson 84'	Report	Junker 4'; Zinckernagel 12'; Boniface (yellow card) 82'	Stadium: Marienlyst Stadion; Attendance: 200; Referee: Espen Eskås

29 November 2020 26	Bodø/Glimt	5–1	Rosenborg	Bodø
18:00 CET (UTC+1)	Junker 15'; Solbakken 27' (yellow card) 49'; Zinckernagel 78'; Moberg 86'; Konradsen 87'	Report	Ceïde (yellow card) 41'; Dahl Reitan (yellow card) 60'; Islamović 83'	Stadium: Aspmyra Stadion; Attendance: 600; Referee: Rohit Saggi

2 December 2020 27	Start	1–1	Bodø/Glimt	Kristiansand
18:00 CET (UTC+1)	Amundsen 17' (o.g.); Bolaños (yellow card) 26'; El Makrini (yellow card) 29'; Deumeland (yellow card) 75'	Report	Berg (yellow card) 24'; Junker 26' (pen.); Sampsted (yellow card) 32'	Stadium: Sør Arena; Attendance: 600; Referee: Mohammad Usman Aslam

6 December 2020 28	Bodø/Glimt	5–2	Stabæk	Bodø
17:00 CET (UTC+1)	Zinckernagel 3', 51'; Junker 12' (pen.); Saltnes 19'; Fet 68'	Report	Ottesen (yellow card) 44'; Jenssen (yellow card) 61'; Kinoshita 90+3', 90+4'	Stadium: Aspmyra Stadion; Attendance: 600; Referee: Sivert Amland

9 December 2020 29	Haugesund	0–4	Bodø/Glimt	Haugesund
18:00 CET (UTC+1)	Knudsen (yellow card) 60'; Koné (yellow card) 85'	Report	Junker 28' (pen.), 78', 87'; Zinckernagel 31'; Khaykin (yellow card) 60'; Sampsted (yellow card) 68'	Stadium: Haugesund Stadion; Attendance: 600; Referee: Mohammad Usman Aslam

19 December 2020 30	Bodø/Glimt	3–0	Viking	Bodø
18:00 CET (UTC+1)	Fet 14'; Junker 21', 89'	Report	Vevatne (yellow card) 87'	Stadium: Aspmyra Stadion; Attendance: 600; Referee: Kristoffer Hagenes

=== Norwegian Cup ===
2020 First round	–
CEST (UTC+2)
Note: Cup cancelled on 10 September due to the COVID-19 pandemic in Norway.

=== Europa League ===
==== Qualifying rounds ====
27 August 2020 First qualifying round	Bodø/Glimt (Norway)	6–1	(Lithuania) Kauno Žalgiris	Bodø, Norway
18:00 CEST (UTC+2)	Zinckernagel 27', 36'; Hauge 52', 59' (pen.); Boniface 79'; Tounekti 81'	Report	Dapkus (yellow card) 58'; Otele 78'	Stadium: Aspmyra Stadion; Attendance: 0 Referee: Kaarlo Oskari Hämäläinen (Finland)
Note: Match played behind closed doors.

17 September 2020 Second qualifying round	Bodø/Glimt (Norway)	3–1	(Lithuania) Žalgiris	Bodø, Norway
18:00 CEST (UTC+2)	Lode (yellow card) 17'; Zinckernagel 20'; Boniface 32'; Bjørkan 81'	Report	Šimkus (yellow card) 21'; Antal 26'; Karamarko (yellow card) 81'	Stadium: Aspmyra Stadion; Attendance: 0 Referee: Peter Kralović (Slovakia)
Note: Match played behind closed doors.

24 September 2020 Third qualifying round	Milan (Italy)	3–2	(Norway) Bodø/Glimt	Milan, Italy
20:30 CEST (UTC+2)	Çalhanoğlu 16', 50'; Colombo 32'	Report	Junker 15'; Hauge 55'; Konradsen (yellow card) 69'	Stadium: San Siro; Attendance: 0 Referee: Fran Jović (Croatia)
Note: Match played behind closed doors.

== Squad statistics ==
As of match played 19 December 2020

=== Appearances and goals ===
No.	Pos	Nat	Player	Total		Eliteserien		Norwegian Cup		Europa League	
No.	Pos	Nat	Player	Apps	Goals	Apps	Goals	Apps	Goals	Apps	Goals
1	GK	(Netherlands) NED	Joshua Smits	10	0	10	0	0	0	0	0
2	DF	(Norway) NOR	Marius Lode	29	1	26	1	0	0	3	0
3	DF	(Iceland) ISL	Alfons Sampsted	32	0	29	0	0	0	2+1	0
4	DF	(Norway) NOR	Marius Høibråten	31	1	18+11	1	0	0	2	0
5	DF	(Norway) NOR	Fredrik André Bjørkan	33	1	30	1	0	0	3	0
6	DF	(Norway) NOR	Isak Amundsen	10	0	3+7	0	0	0	0	0
7	MF	(Norway) NOR	Patrick Berg	31	5	28	4	0	0	3	1
8	FW	(Nigeria) NGA	Victor Boniface	27	8	7+17	6	0	0	2+1	2
10	MF	(Denmark) DEN	Philip Zinckernagel	31	22	28	19	0	0	3	3
11	FW	(Norway) NOR	Jens Petter Hauge	21	17	18	14	0	0	3	3
12	GK	(Russia) RUS	Nikita Khaykin	23	0	20	0	0	0	3	0
14	MF	(Norway) NOR	Ulrik Saltnes	33	12	30	12	0	0	3	0
15	FW	(Norway) NOR	Runar Hauge	8	0	0+8	0	0	0	0	0
16	MF	(Norway) NOR	Morten Konradsen	12	1	4+6	1	0	0	1+1	0
17	MF	(Norway) NOR	Sebastian Tounekti	10	2	2+7	1	0	0	0+1	1
18	DF	(Norway) NOR	Brede Moe	14	0	13	0	0	0	1	0
19	MF	(Norway) NOR	Sondre Brunstad Fet	29	5	23+3	5	0	0	3	0
20	MF	(Norway) NOR	Hugo Vetlesen	8	1	2+6	1	0	0	0	0
21	FW	(Denmark) DEN	Kasper Junker	26	28	24+1	27	0	0	1	1
22	MF	(Norway) NOR	Vegard Moberg	7	3	3+4	3	0	0	0	0
23	MF	(Norway) NOR	Elias Hagen	8	0	1+7	0	0	0	0	0
24	DF	(Norway) NOR	Aleksander Foosnæs	9	0	0+8	0	0	0	0+1	0
26	FW	(Norway) NOR	Ola Solbakken	24	3	11+11	3	0	0	0+2	0
35	MF	(Norway) NOR	Adan Abadala Hussein	1	0	0+1	0	0	0	0	0
37	MF	(Norway) NOR	Ask Tjaerandsen-Skau	1	0	0+1	0	0	0	0	0
Players away from Bodø/Glimt on loan:
Players who appeared for Bodø/Glimt no longer at the club:
20	MF	(Denmark) DEN	Sammy Skytte	11	1	0+11	1	0	0	0	0
22	FW	(Norway) NOR	Ole Amund Sveen	10	0	0+8	0	0	0	0+2	0

=== Goalscorers ===
Rank	Pos.	No.	Nat.	Player	Eliteserien	Norwegian Cup	Europa League	Total
1	FW	21	(Denmark)	Kasper Junker	27	0	1	28
2	MF	10	(Denmark)	Philip Zinckernagel	19	0	3	22
3	FW	11	(Norway)	Jens Petter Hauge	14	0	3	17
4	MF	14	(Norway)	Ulrik Saltnes	12	0	0	12
5	FW	8	(Nigeria)	Victor Boniface	6	0	2	8
7	MF	19	(Norway)	Sondre Brunstad Fet	5	0	0	5
7	MF	7	(Norway)	Patrick Berg	4	0	1	5
8	MF	22	(Norway)	Vegard Moberg	3	0	0	3
8	FW	26	(Norway)	Ola Solbakken	3	0	0	3
10	MF	20	(Denmark)	Sammy Skytte	2	0	0	2
10	MF	17	(Norway)	Sebastian Tounekti	1	0	1	2
10				Own goal	2	0	0	2
13	DF	4	(Norway)	Marius Høibråten	1	0	0	1
13	DF	2	(Norway)	Marius Lode	1	0	0	1
13	MF	20	(Norway)	Hugo Vetlesen	1	0	0	1
13	DF	5	(Norway)	Fredrik André Bjørkan	1	0	0	1
13	MF	16	(Norway)	Morten Konradsen	1	0	0	1
TOTALS					103	0	11	114

=== Clean sheets ===
Rank	Pos.	No.	Nat.	Player	Eliteserien	Norwegian Cup	Europa League	Total
1	GK	12	(Russia)	Nikita Khaykin	7	0	0	7
2	GK	1	(Netherlands)	Joshua Smits	2	0	0	2
TOTALS					9	0	0	9

=== Disciplinary record ===
No.	Pos.	Nat.	Name	Eliteserien		Norwegian Cup		Europa League		Total	
No.	Pos.	Nat.	Name	Booked	Sent off (straight red)	Booked	Sent off (straight red)	Booked	Sent off (straight red)	Booked	Sent off (straight red)
1	GK	(Netherlands)	Joshua Smits	1	0	0	0	0	0	1	0
2	DF	(Norway)	Marius Lode	3	1	0	0	1	0	4	1
3	DF	(Iceland)	Alfons Sampsted	2	0	0	0	0	0	2	0
4	DF	(Norway)	Marius Høibråten	2	0	0	0	0	0	2	0
5	DF	(Norway)	Fredrik André Bjørkan	2	0	0	0	0	0	2	0
7	MF	(Norway)	Patrick Berg	3	0	0	0	0	0	3	0
8	FW	(Nigeria)	Victor Boniface	5	0	0	0	0	0	5	0
10	MF	(Denmark)	Philip Zinckernagel	3	0	0	0	0	0	3	0
11	FW	(Norway)	Jens Petter Hauge	2	0	0	0	0	0	2	0
12	GK	(Russia)	Nikita Khaykin	1	0	0	0	0	0	1	0
14	MF	(Norway)	Ulrik Saltnes	2	0	0	0	0	0	2	0
16	MF	(Norway)	Morten Konradsen	0	0	0	0	1	0	1	0
19	MF	(Norway)	Sondre Brunstad Fet	4	0	0	0	0	0	4	0
20	MF	(Norway)	Hugo Vetlesen	1	0	0	0	0	0	1	0
21	FW	(Denmark)	Kasper Junker	3	0	0	0	0	0	3	0
22	MF	(Norway)	Vegard Moberg	1	0	0	0	0	0	1	0
24	DF	(Norway)	Aleksander Foosnæs	1	0	0	0	0	0	1	0
26	FW	(Norway)	Ola Solbakken	1	0	0	0	0	0	1	0
Players who appeared for Bodø/Glimt no longer at the club:
20	MF	(Denmark)	Sammy Skytte	1	0	0	0	0	0	1	0
TOTALS				38	1	0	0	2	0	40	1
