= Alexander Hansen =

Alexander Hansen may refer to:

- Alexander Betten Hansen (born 1996), Norwegian football defender
- Alexander Lund Hansen (born 1982), Norwegian footballer

== See also ==
- Alexander Lindqvist-Hansen (born 1992), Swedish ice hockey player
