= 2020 Eliteserien promotion/relegation play-offs =

Norwegian football league play-offs

The 2020 Eliteserien promotion/relegation play-offs was the 47th time a spot in the Eliteserien was decided by play-off matches between top tier and second-level clubs. In the play-offs, five teams competed for one spot in the 2021 Eliteserien.

== Background ==
The play-offs take place following the conclusion of the regular season and are contested by the 14th-placed club in Eliteserien and the four clubs finishing below the two automatic promotion places in the 1. divisjon. The fixtures are determined by final league position – the first round will be played between the 5th and 6th placed teams, and the winner will advance to play away to the 4th placed team in the second round. The winner of the second round will advance to play away to 3rd placed team in the third round. The winner of the third round will meet the 14th placed team in the Eliteserien on neutral ground.

== Qualified teams ==
Five teams entered a play-off for the last Eliteserien spot for the 2021 season. These were:

- Mjøndalen (14th placed team of the 2020 Eliteserien)
- Sogndal (3rd placed team in the 2020 1. divisjon)
- Ranheim (fourth placed team in the 2020 1. divisjon)
- Åsane (fifth placed team in the 2020 1. divisjon)
- Raufoss (sixth placed team in the 2020 1. divisjon)

== Final league position ==
Only the top 8 teams are displayed.

Pos	Team	Pld	W	D	L	GF	GA	GD	Pts	Promotion, qualification or relegation
1	Tromsø (C, P)	30	19	6	5	60	29	+31	63	Promotion to Eliteserien
2	Lillestrøm (P)	30	16	9	5	49	26	+23	57	Promotion to Eliteserien
3	Sogndal (Q)	30	15	6	9	57	36	+21	51	Qualification to promotion play-offs
4	Ranheim (Q)	30	13	8	9	61	41	+20	47	Qualification to promotion play-offs
5	Åsane (Q)	30	12	9	9	60	48	+12	45	Qualification to promotion play-offs
6	Raufoss (Q)	30	11	10	9	53	44	+9	43	Qualification to promotion play-offs
7	Sandnes Ulf	30	11	8	11	46	55	−9	41	
8	KFUM Oslo	30	10	9	11	44	44	0	39	

Source: NFF, Soccerway
Rules for classification: 1) Points; 2) Goal difference; 3) Number of goals scored;
(C) Champions; (P) Promoted; (Q) Qualified for the phase indicated

== 1. divisjon Promotion playoffs ==
=== Matches ===
The third to sixth-placed teams took part in the promotion play-offs; these were single leg knockout matches, three rounds involving 1. divisjon teams and a final between the winner of these rounds and the 14th-placed team in Eliteserien.

The winners, Sogndal, advanced to play the 14th-placed team in Eliteserien, Mjøndalen, in the Eliteserien play-offs for a spot in the top-flight in the 2021 Eliteserien.

==== First round ====
16 December 2020
16:00 CET (UTC+1)

Åsane	3–1	Raufoss
Lorentzen 36', 88'; Valsvik 45' (pen.)	Report	Ndiaye 24'

Vestlandshallen, Bergen
Attendance: 50
Referee: Tore Hansen

==== Second round ====
19 December 2020
13:00 CET (UTC+1)

Ranheim	4–1	Åsane
Sæter 19' (pen.), 28', 60'; Rønning 90+1'	Report	Steen 52'

EXTRA Arena, Trondheim
Attendance: 600
Referee: Espen Andreas Eskås

==== Third round ====
22 December 2020
13:00 CET (UTC+1)

Sogndal	3–1	Ranheim
Kupen 25'; Michael 38'; Adams 78'	Report	Rønning 13'

Fosshaugane Campus, Sogndalsfjøra
Attendance: 600
Referee: Sivert Øksnes Amland

== Final ==
The 14th-placed team in Eliteserien (Mjøndalen) played against the winners of the 1. divisjon promotion play-offs (Sogndal) on neutral ground to decide who will play in the 2021 Eliteserien.

28 December 2020
17:00 CET (UTC+1)

Mjøndalen	3–2	Sogndal
Sveen 9', 88'; Nakkim 90+7'	Report	Adams 79' (pen.); Kristoffersen 80'

Intility Arena, Oslo
Attendance: 200
Referee: Tom Harald Hagen

Mjøndalen won 3–2 and maintained their position in the Eliteserien; Sogndal stayed in the 1. divisjon.

== Bracket ==
First round
5	Åsane	3
6	Raufoss	1

Second round
4	Ranheim	4
5	Åsane	1

Third round
3	Sogndal	3
4	Ranheim	1

Final
Intility Arena, Oslo
14	Mjøndalen	3
3	Sogndal	2
