= Andreas Hellum =

Norwegian footballer (born 1997)

Personal information
- Date of birth: 19 November 1997 (age 28)
- Position: Forward

Team information
- Current team: Lyn
- Number: 11

Youth career
- Birkebeineren
- 2010–2016: Mjøndalen

Senior career*
Years	Team	Apps	(Gls)
2013–2018	Mjøndalen 2	54	(44)
2016–2020	Mjøndalen	56	(7)
2016	→ Asker (loan)	9	(2)
2016	→ Asker 2 (loan)	1	(0)
2018	→ Nybergsund (loan)	10	(3)
2019	→ Strømmen (loan)	18	(1)
2019	→ Strømmen 2 (loan)	4	(3)
2021–2022	Arendal	36	(22)
2023–	Lyn	105	(54)
2024	Lyn 2	5	(13)
- * Club domestic league appearances and goals as of 14 November 2026

Andreas Hellum (born 19 November 1997) is a Norwegian footballer who plays as a forward for Lyn.

== Career ==
His childhood club was Birkebeineren, whence he moved to Mjøndalen at the age of 13. Making his senior debut for Mjøndalen in 2016, even scoring a goal, and playing several dozens of 1. divisjon games, Hellum was at times deemed surplus to requirements and loaned out to Asker in 2016, Nybergsund in 2018 and Strømmen in 2019. He then returned to play the 2020 Eliteserien opener. His only Eliteserien goal came in 2020 against Brann. After the season he was released, and joined Arendal in the Norwegian Second Division.

On 1 February 2023, Hellum signed a contract with Lyn, on 2 two-year contract.

== Career statistics ==
As of 14 November 2026

Appearances and goals by club, season and competition
Club	Season	League			National Cup		Europe		Total	
Club	Season	Division	Apps	Goals	Apps	Goals	Apps	Goals	Apps	Goals
Mjøndalen 2	2013	3. divisjon	1	0	—		—		1	0
Mjøndalen 2	2014	3. divisjon	10	2	—		—		10	2
Mjøndalen 2	2015	3. divisjon	15	6	—		—		15	6
Mjøndalen 2	2016	3. divisjon	5	5	—		—		5	5
Mjøndalen 2	2017	4. divisjon	17	28	—		—		17	28
Mjøndalen 2	2018	4. divisjon	6	3	—		—		6	3
Mjøndalen 2	Total		54	44	—		—		54	44
Mjøndalen	2016	1. divisjon	10	1	0	0	0	0	10	1
Mjøndalen	2017	1. divisjon	18	4	1	0	2 (Note: Appearance(s) in 1. divisjon promotional play-offs)	0	21	4
Mjøndalen	2018	1. divisjon	12	1	4	2	—		16	3
Mjøndalen	2020	Eliteserien	16	1	—		0	0	16	1
Mjøndalen	Total		56	7	5	2	2	0	63	9
Asker (loan)	2016	2. divisjon	9	2	0	0	—		9	2
Asker 2 (loan)	2016	3. divisjon	1	0	—		—		1	0
Nybergsund (loan)	2018	2. divisjon	10	3	0	0	—		10	3
Strømmen (loan)	2019	1. divisjon	18	1	3	0	—		21	1
Strømmen 2 (loan)	2019	4. divisjon	4	3	—		—		4	3
Arendal	2021	2. divisjon	24	17	2	3	1 (Note: Appearance(s) in 2. divisjon promotional play-offs)	1	27	21
Arendal	2022	2. divisjon	12	5	0	0	3	0	15	5
Arendal	Total		36	22	2	3	4	1	42	26
Lyn	2023	2. divisjon	26	15	1	0	4	0	31	15
Lyn	2024	1. divisjon	20	7	1	0	1	0	22	7
Lyn	2025	1. divisjon	30	15	5	2	0	0	35	17
Lyn	2026	1. divisjon	29	17	3	2	0	0	32	19
Lyn	Total		105	54	10	4	5	0	120	58
Lyn 2	2024	4. divisjon	5	13	—		—		5	13
Career total			298	149	20	9	11	1	329	159
