= Jonas Ueland Kolstad =

Norwegian footballer (born 1976)

Personal information
- Full name: Jonas Ueland Kolstad
- Date of birth: 21 September 1976 (age 50)
- Place of birth: Bodø, Norway
- Height: 1.86 m (6 ft 1 in)
- Position: Goalkeeper

Team information
- Current team: Bodø/Glimt
- Number: 43

Senior career*
Years	Team	Apps	(Gls)
1994	Bodø/Glimt	0	(0)
1995–1996	Stålkameratene		
1997–1998	Drøbak/Frogn		
1999–2000	Årvoll	35	(0)
2002–2017	Bodø/Glimt	61	(0)
2020	Bodø/Glimt	0	(0)

International career
1992	Norway U15	8	(0)
1993	Norway U16	1	(0)
1994	Norway U17	3	(0)
1995	Norway U18	3	(0)

Managerial career
- 2015–: Bodø/Glimt (goalkeeping coach)
- * Club domestic league appearances and goals as of 12 December 2015

Jonas Ueland Kolstad (born 21 September 1976) is a former Norwegian football goalkeeper who currently goalkeeping coach for Bodø/Glimt.

He got 15 youth caps for Norway. (Note: Jonas Ueland Kolstad at the Norwegian Football Federation (in Norwegian)) In 2015, he became goalkeeper coach for Bodø/Glimt after Tor Arne Aga became director for Bodø HK.

In 2020, after injury to 3rd choice keeper Marcus Andersen and Joshua Smits being quarantine after signing a contract on 12 June 2020. Kolstad became the backup keeper for Bodø/Glimt first game of the season.

== Career statistics ==
As of 29 October 2017

Season	Club	Division	League		Cup		Total	
Season	Club	Division	Apps	Goals	Apps	Goals	Apps	Goals
2002	Bodø/Glimt	Eliteserien	0	0	0	0	0	0
2003	Bodø/Glimt	Eliteserien	1	0	4	0	5	0
2004	Bodø/Glimt	Eliteserien	0	0	1	0	1	0
2005	Bodø/Glimt	Eliteserien	1	0	1	0	2	0
2006	Bodø/Glimt	1. divisjon	21	0	2	0	23	0
2007	Bodø/Glimt	1. divisjon	5	0	1	0	6	0
2008	Bodø/Glimt	Eliteserien	2	0	3	0	5	0
2009	Bodø/Glimt	Eliteserien	3	0	2	0	5	0
2010	Bodø/Glimt	1. divisjon	4	0	0	0	4	0
2011	Bodø/Glimt	1. divisjon	16	0	2	0	18	0
2012	Bodø/Glimt	1. divisjon	3	0	3	0	6	0
2013	Bodø/Glimt	1. divisjon	5	0	1	0	6	0
2014	Bodø/Glimt	Eliteserien	0	0	0	0	0	0
2015	Bodø/Glimt	Eliteserien	0	0	0	0	0	0
2016	Bodø/Glimt	Eliteserien	0	0	0	0	0	0
2017	Bodø/Glimt	1. divisjon	0	0	0	0	0	0
2020	Bodø/Glimt	Eliteserien	0	0	0	0	0	0
Career Total			61	0	20	0	81	0
