= Alexander Lindqvist-Hansen =

Swedish ice hockey player

- Born: March 8, 1992 (age 33) Skövde, Sweden
- Height: 168 cm (5 ft 6 in)
- Weight: 80 lb (36 kg; 5 st 10 lb)
- Position: Left wing/Right Wing
- Shoots: Left
- Metal Ligaen team Former teams: Herlev Eagles; Västerviks IK; IF Troja-Ljungby; Rögle BK; Växjö Lakers
- NHL draft: Undrafted
- Playing career: 2010–present

Alexander Lindqvist-Hansen (born March 8, 1992) is a Swedish ice hockey player and the current captain of the Herlev Eagles in the Danish Metal Ligaen.

Lindqvist-Hansen made his Elitserien (now Swedish Hockey League) debut playing with Rögle BK during the 2012–13 Elitserien season.
