= 2020 Eliteserien =

76th season of top-tier football league in Norway

Eliteserien
- Season: 2020
- Dates: 16 June – 22 December
- Champions: Bodø/Glimt; 1st title
- Relegated: Aalesund; Start
- Champions League: Bodø/Glimt
- Europa Conference League: Molde; Vålerenga; Rosenborg
- Matches: 240
- Goals: 758 (3.16 per match)
- Top goalscorer: Kasper Junker (27 goals)
- Biggest home win: Bodø/Glimt 7–0 Aalesund (8 November 2020)
- Biggest away win: Start 0–5 Odd (27 June 2020); Aalesund 1–6 Bodø/Glimt (12 July 2020)
- Highest scoring: Kristiansund 7–2 Aalesund (21 June 2020)
- Longest winning run: 10 matches Bodø/Glimt
- Longest unbeaten run: 20 matches Bodø/Glimt
- Longest winless run: 13 matches Strømsgodset
- Longest losing run: 9 matches Aalesund
- Average attendance: 295 ▼94.9%
- All statistics correct as of 9 November 2020.

The 2020 Eliteserien was the 76th season of top-tier football in Norway. This was fourth season of Eliteserien as rebranding from Tippeligaen.

The season was scheduled to begin on 4 April. However, due to the COVID-19 pandemic in Norway the opening games of the season were delayed. It was first delayed until 2 May, then further delayed until 23 May. The season was scheduled to end 29 November 2020, not including play-off matches, but was rescheduled to conclude on 22 December. On 7 May, the Norwegian government allowed the league to start on 16 June with full training starting immediately.

Molde were the defending champions. Aalesund, Sandefjord and Start joined as the promoted clubs from the 2019 1. divisjon. They replaced Lillestrøm, Tromsø and Ranheim who were relegated to the 2020 1. divisjon.

== Effects of the COVID-19 pandemic ==
The season was scheduled to begin on 4 April, but on 12 March it was revealed that the first five rounds of the season were postponed and the opening game therefore would be delayed until 2 May due to the COVID-19 pandemic in Norway. On 24 March, the Norwegian Football Federation announced that the football season was further delayed till 23 May. On 7 May, the Norwegian government allowed the teams to begin with full training starting immediately, and opened for the league season to start on 16 June. On 12 June, the NFF announced that 200 spectators would be allowed to attend the games. On 30 September, the Minister of Culture and Church Affairs, Abid Raja, announced that clubs would be able to have crowds of 600 at games from 12 October.

== Teams ==
Sixteen teams compete in the league – the top thirteen teams from the previous season, and three teams promoted from 1. division. The promoted teams were Aalesund (after an absence of two years), Sandefjord and Start (both returning to the top flight after one season's absence). They replaced Lillestrøm, Tromsø and Ranheim, ending their top flight spells of forty-five, five and two years respectively.

=== Stadiums and locations ===
Locations of the teams in 2020 Eliteserien

Note: Table lists in alphabetical order.

Team	Ap.	Location	Arena	Turf	Capacity
Aalesund	17	Ålesund	Color Line Stadion	Artificial	10,778
Bodø/Glimt	25	Bodø	Aspmyra Stadion	Artificial	5,635
Brann	63	Bergen	Brann Stadion	Natural	17,049
Haugesund	14	Haugesund	Haugesund Stadion	Natural	8,754
Kristiansund	4	Kristiansund	Kristiansund Stadion	Artificial	4,444
Mjøndalen	21	Mjøndalen	Consto Arena	Artificial	4,200
Molde	44	Molde	Aker Stadion	Artificial	11,249
Odd	39	Skien	Skagerak Arena	Artificial	11,767
Rosenborg	57	Trondheim	Lerkendal Stadion	Natural	21,421
Sandefjord	8	Sandefjord	Sandefjord Arena	Natural	6,582
Sarpsborg 08	9	Sarpsborg	Sarpsborg Stadion	Artificial	8,022
Stabæk	24	Bærum	Nadderud Stadion	Natural	4,938
Start	42	Kristiansand	Sør Arena	Artificial	14,448
Strømsgodset	33	Drammen	Marienlyst Stadion	Artificial	8,935
Vålerenga	60	Oslo	Intility Arena	Artificial	16,555
Viking	70	Stavanger	Viking Stadion	Artificial	15,900

=== Personnel and kits ===
Team	Manager	Captain	Kit manufacturer	Shirt sponsor
Aalesund	(Norway) Lars Arne Nilsen	(Norway) Fredrik Carlsen	Umbro	Sparebanken Møre
Bodø/Glimt	(Norway) Kjetil Knutsen	(Norway) Ulrik Saltnes	Diadora	Sparebanken Nord-Norge
Brann	(Norway) Kåre Ingebrigtsen	(Norway) Kristoffer Barmen	Nike	Sparebanken Vest
Haugesund	(Norway) Jostein Grindhaug	(Norway) Christian Grindheim	Macron	Haugaland Kraft
Kristiansund	(Norway) Christian Michelsen	(Norway) Dan Peter Ulvestad	Macron	SpareBank 1 Nordvest
Mjøndalen	(Norway) Vegard Hansen	(Norway) Christian Gauseth	Umbro	Sparebanken Øst
Molde	(Norway) Erling Moe	(Norway) Magnus Wolff Eikrem	Nike	Sparebanken Møre
Odd	(Norway) Jan Frode Nornes	(Norway) Steffen Hagen	Hummel	SpareBank 1 Telemark
Rosenborg	(Norway) Åge Hareide	(Norway) Tore Reginiussen	Adidas	SpareBank 1 SMN
Sandefjord	(Spain) Martí Cifuentes	(Norway) Lars Grorud	Macron	Jotun
Sarpsborg 08	(Sweden) Mikael Stahre	(Norway) Joachim Thomassen	Select	Borregaard
Stabæk	(Sweden) Jan Jönsson	(Norway) Yaw Amankwah	Macron	SpareBank 1 Østlandet
Start	(Iceland) Jóhannes Harðarson	(Norway) Erlend Segberg	Macron	Sparebanken Sør
Strømsgodset	(Denmark) Henrik Pedersen	(Denmark) Mikkel Maigaard	Puma	DNB
Vålerenga	(Norway) Dag-Eilev Fagermo	(Norway) Jonatan Tollås	Umbro	DNB
Viking	(Norway) Bjarne Berntsen	(Norway) Viljar Vevatne	Diadora	Lyse

=== Managerial changes ===
Team	Outgoing manager	Manner of departure	Date of vacancy	Table	Incoming manager	Date of appointment	Table
Sarpsborg 08	(Norway) Geir Bakke	Signed by Lillestrøm	1 January 2020	Pre-season	(Sweden) Mikael Stahre	13 January 2020	Pre-season
Vålerenga	(Norway) Ronny Deila	Signed by New York City	6 January 2020	Pre-season	(Norway) Dag-Eilev Fagermo	31 January 2020	Pre-season
Odd	(Norway) Dag-Eilev Fagermo	Signed by Vålerenga	31 January 2020	Pre-season	(Norway) Jan Frode Nornes	11 March 2020	Pre-season
Rosenborg	(Norway) Eirik Horneland	Mutual consent	26 June 2020	12th	(Norway) Trond Henriksen (interim)	21 July 2020	
Brann	(Norway) Lars Arne Nilsen	Mutual consent	1 August 2020	8th	(Norway) Kåre Ingebrigtsen	8 August 2020	7
Aalesund	(Norway) Lars Bohinen	Sacked	23 August 2020	16th	(Norway) Lars Arne Nilsen	25 August 2020	16
Rosenborg	(Norway) Trond Henriksen (interim)	End of caretaker spell	1 September 2020	4th	(Norway) Åge Hareide	1 September 2020	4

== League table ==
Pos	Team	Pld	W	D	L	GF	GA	GD	Pts	Qualification or relegation
1	Bodø/Glimt (C)	30	26	3	1	103	32	+71	81	Qualification for the Champions League first qualifying round
2	Molde	30	20	2	8	77	36	+41	62	Qualification for the Europa Conference League second qualifying round
3	Vålerenga	30	15	10	5	51	33	+18	55	Qualification for the Europa Conference League second qualifying round
4	Rosenborg	30	15	7	8	50	35	+15	52	Qualification for the Europa Conference League second qualifying round
5	Kristiansund	30	12	12	6	57	45	+12	48	
6	Viking	30	12	8	10	54	52	+2	44	
7	Odd	30	13	4	13	52	51	+1	43	
8	Stabæk	30	9	12	9	41	45	−4	39	
9	Haugesund	30	11	6	13	39	51	−12	39	
10	Brann	30	9	9	12	40	49	−9	36	
11	Sandefjord	30	9	8	13	31	43	−12	35	
12	Sarpsborg 08	30	8	8	14	33	43	−10	32	
13	Strømsgodset	30	7	10	13	41	57	−16	31	
14	Mjøndalen (O)	30	8	3	19	26	45	−19	27	Qualification for the relegation play-offs
15	Start (R)	30	6	9	15	33	56	−23	27	Relegation to First Division
16	Aalesund (R)	30	2	5	23	30	85	−55	11	Relegation to First Division

Source: Football Association of Norway (in Norwegian)
Rules for classification: 1) Points; 2) Goal difference; 3) Goals scored; 4) Head-to-head points; 5) Head-to-head goal difference; 6) Head-to-head away goals scored (only if between two teams); 7) Head-to-head goals scored; 8) Play-off (only used to decide champions or relegation).
(C) Champions; (O) Play-off winners; (R) Relegated

== Results ==
Home \ Away	AAL	BOD	BRA	HAU	KRI	MIF	MOL	ODD	ROS	SAN	SRP	STB	IKS	STM	VÅL	VIK
Aalesund	—	1–6	2–2	1–3	1–2	1–3	1–4	0–3	1–2	0–1	0–1	1–3	3–2	1–4	1–1	2–2
Bodø/Glimt	7–0	—	5–0	6–1	2–1	2–0	3–1	6–1	5–1	2–1	2–1	5–2	6–0	3–2	2–0	3–0
Brann	3–1	1–3	—	1–2	1–1	0–1	1–2	2–1	1–2	3–1	1–1	1–1	1–1	1–1	1–2	3–0
Haugesund	0–1	0–4	1–2	—	2–2	1–1	0–3	4–4	1–0	3–2	2–0	3–1	1–0	2–3	2–1	0–2
Kristiansund	7–2	2–3	1–1	1–2	—	1–0	2–2	4–3	0–0	3–1	4–1	1–2	3–2	2–1	0–0	3–5
Mjøndalen	3–0	2–3	2–0	1–0	1–2	—	1–3	0–2	0–2	0–2	1–0	0–1	1–0	3–0	0–1	1–2
Molde	2–1	4–2	1–2	3–1	2–2	2–1	—	2–0	1–0	0–1	5–0	4–1	5–0	2–1	4–1	5–0
Odd	3–2	0–4	1–0	0–0	2–1	6–1	1–4	—	2–1	1–2	1–1	2–0	1–2	1–3	4–1	3–0
Rosenborg	3–2	2–3	2–3	2–1	0–0	1–0	3–1	4–1	—	2–1	5–1	2–2	1–0	3–0	1–1	3–0
Sandefjord	1–0	1–2	3–3	0–1	0–2	1–0	2–1	1–1	0–0	—	0–3	0–0	2–2	0–0	0–3	2–2
Sarpsborg 08	4–0	0–3	0–1	0–0	1–1	2–0	2–1	2–0	1–2	0–0	—	4–0	1–0	2–3	0–1	1–2
Stabæk	4–0	2–2	0–2	2–1	2–2	0–0	0–3	0–1	0–3	2–0	1–1	—	2–0	2–0	1–1	1–1
Start	1–0	1–1	1–1	5–1	0–2	3–0	2–3	0–5	0–0	0–1	3–2	0–0	—	2–2	2–1	1–1
Strømsgodset	1–1	1–2	3–1	2–2	2–2	2–1	0–4	1–0	3–3	3–4	0–0	0–4	1–1	—	0–2	0–2
Vålerenga	2–2	2–2	5–1	1–0	1–1	4–1	2–1	2–0	1–0	2–1	1–1	2–2	4–0	2–0	—	2–1
Viking	5–2	2–4	2–0	0–1	1–2	1–1	3–2	1–2	3–0	2–0	3–0	3–3	4–1	2–2	2–2	—

Source: Football Association of Norway (in Norwegian)
Legend: Blue = home team win; Yellow = draw; Red = away team win.
For upcoming matches, an "a" indicates there is an article about the rivalry between the two participants.

== Relegation playoffs ==
The 14th-placed team in Eliteserien will play against the winners of the 1. divisjon promotion play-offs on neutral ground to decide who will play in the 2021 Eliteserien.

28 December 2020
17:00 CET (UTC+1)

Mjøndalen	3–2	Sogndal
Sveen 9', 88'; Nakkim 90+7'	Report	Adams 79' (pen.); Kristoffersen 80'

Intility Arena, Oslo
Attendance: 200
Referee: Tom Harald Hagen

Mjøndalen IF won 3–2 and maintained their position in the Eliteserien; Sogndal Fotball stayed in the 1. divisjon.

== Season statistics ==
As of 19 December 2020

=== Top scorers ===
Rank	Player	Club	Goals
1	(Denmark) Kasper Junker	Bodø/Glimt	27
2	(Norway) Amahl Pellegrino	Kristiansund	25
3	(Denmark) Philip Zinckernagel	Bodø/Glimt	19
4	(Norway) Veton Berisha	Viking	16
5	(Norway) Mushaga Bakenga	Odd	15
6	(Norway) Jens Petter Hauge	Bodø/Glimt	14
7	(Nigeria) Leke James	Molde	13
8	(Montenegro) Dino Islamovic	Rosenborg	12
8	(Norway) Ohi Omoijuanfo	Molde	12
8	(Norway) Ulrik Saltnes	Bodø/Glimt	12
8	(Norway) Kristoffer Zachariassen	Rosenborg	12

=== Hat-tricks ===
Player	For	Against	Result	Date
(Denmark) Kasper Junker	Bodø/Glimt	Haugesund	6–1 (H)	21 June 2020
(Norway) Amahl Pellegrino	Kristiansund	Aalesund	7–2 (H)	21 June 2020
(Norway) Torgeir Børven	Odd	Vålerenga	4–1 (H)	24 June 2020
(Denmark) Kasper Junker	Bodø/Glimt	Brann	5–0 (H)	5 July 2020
(Iceland) Viðar Örn Kjartansson	Vålerenga	Brann	5–1 (H)	13 September 2020
(Ivory Coast) Daouda Bamba	Brann	Aalesund	3–1 (H)	28 November 2020
(Denmark) Kasper Junker	Bodø/Glimt	Haugesund	0–4 (A)	9 December 2020
(Norway) Mushaga Bakenga	Odd	Kristiansund	4–3 (A)	9 December 2020
(Norway) Lars-Jørgen Salvesen	Strømsgodset	Odd	1–3 (A)	19 December 2020
(Senegal) Ibrahima Wadji	Haugesund	Kristiansund	1–3 (A)	22 December 2020

=== Clean sheets ===
Rank	Player	Club	Clean sheets
1	(North Macedonia) David Mitov Nilsson	Sarpsborg 08	10
1	(Norway) Jacob Storevik	Sandefjord	10
3	(Sweden) Marcus Sandberg	Stabæk	9
4	(Norway) Kristoffer Klaesson	Vålerenga	8
4	(Norway) Sondre Rossbach	Odd	8
6	(Sweden) Andreas Linde	Molde	7
6	(Russia) Nikita Khaykin	Bodø/Glimt	7
6	(Iran) Sosha Makani	Mjøndalen	7
6	(Norway) Helge Sandvik	Haugesund	7
10	(Norway) André Hansen	Rosenborg	5

=== Discipline ===
==== Player ====
- Most yellow cards: 9
  - (Norway) Niklas Gunnarsson (Strømsgodset)
- Most red cards: 2
  - (Norway) Alexander Betten Hansen (Mjøndalen)
  - (Nigeria) Ipalibo Jack (Strømsgodset)

==== Club ====
- Most yellow cards: 69
  - Aalesund
- Most red cards: 3
  - Mjøndalen
  - Molde
  - Sandefjord
  - Vålerenga

== Awards ==
=== Annual awards ===
Award	Winner	Club
Player of the Year	(Denmark) Philip Zinckernagel	Bodø/Glimt
Young Player of the Year	(Norway) Jens Petter Hauge	Bodø/Glimt
Manager of the Year	(Norway) Kjetil Knutsen	Bodø/Glimt
Goal of the Year	(Norway) Ola Brynhildsen	Stabæk

== League attendances ==
Due to COVID-19 restrictions only 200 people were allowed in each match at the beginning of the season.

Two clubs were punished for incidents of racism during their matches, having to play certain games without attendants.

Pos	Team	Total	High	Low	Average	Change
1	Kristiansund	5,400	600	200	360	−91.2%
2	Molde	5,400	600	200	360	−94.8%
3	Bodø/Glimt	5,000	600	200	333	−90.0%
4	Brann	5,000	600	200	333	−97.0%
5	Haugesund	5,000	600	200	333	−92.0%
6	Viking	5,000	600	200	333	−96.3%
7	Sandefjord	4,800	600	0	320	−87.1%^{1}
8	Rosenborg	4,600	600	200	307	−97.6%
9	Start	4,600	600	200	307	−94.2%^{1}
10	Odd	4,450	600	200	297	−94.7%
11	Aalesund	4,000	600	0	267	−93.5%^{1}
12	Mjøndalen	3,800	600	200	253	−89.2%
13	Sarpsborg 08	3,800	600	200	253	−95.4%
14	Strømsgodset	3,800	600	200	253	−95.2%
15	Stabæk	3,187	387	200	212	−94.2%
16	Vålerenga	3,000	200	200	200	−97.4%
	League total	70,837	600	0	295	−94.9%

Updated to games played on 19 December 2020
Source: nifs.no
Notes:
1: Team played last season in 1. divisjon.
