= Lars Olden Larsen =

Norwegian footballer (born 1998)

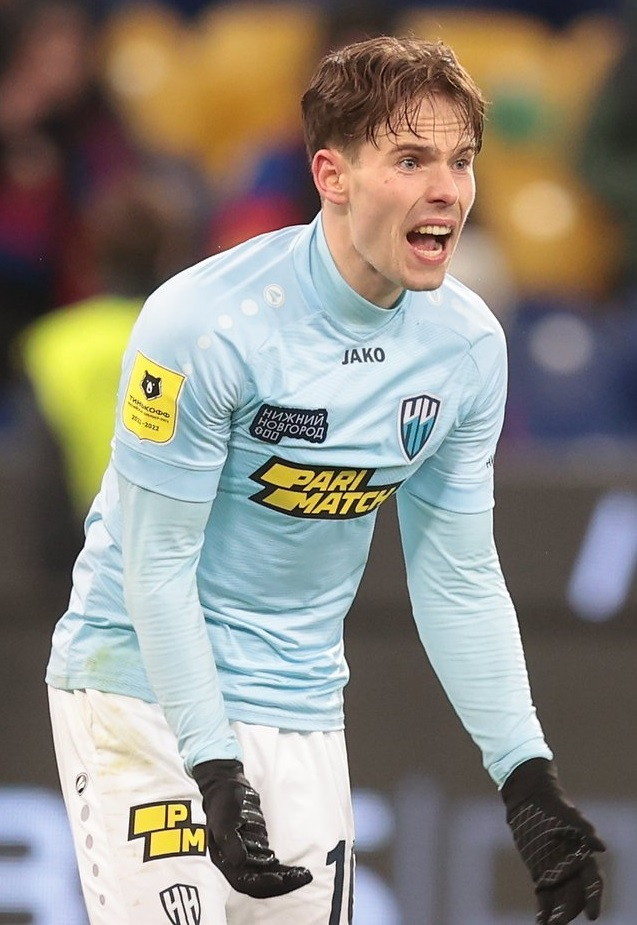
- Larsen with Nizhny Novgorod in 2022

Personal information
- Date of birth: 17 September 1998 (age 28)
- Place of birth: Oslo, Norway
- Height: 1.75 m (5 ft 9 in)
- Positions: Midfielder; winger

Team information
- Current team: Tromsø
- Number: 7

Youth career
- –2014: Årvoll
- 2015–2017: Vålerenga

Senior career*
Years	Team	Apps	(Gls)
2014	Årvoll	5	(0)
2015–2017	Vålerenga 2	27	(3)
2018–2019	KFUM	52	(14)
2018	KFUM 2	3	(1)
2020–2022	Mjøndalen	58	(8)
2022–2023	Nizhny Novgorod	3	(0)
2022–2023	→ BK Häcken (loan)	31	(9)
2023–2025	NEC	30	(1)
2024	→ BK Häcken (loan)	11	(1)
2025	→ Tromsø (loan)		(3)
2026–	Tromsø	17	(1)

International career^{‡}
2016	Norway U18	4	(0)
2019	Norway U21	2	(1)
- * Club domestic league appearances and goals as of 31 August 2026 ‡ National team caps and goals as of 23 August 2025

Lars Olden Larsen (born 17 September 1998) is a Norwegian professional footballer who plays as a winger or central midfielder for Norwegian Eliteserien club Tromsø.

== Career ==
Growing up in Årvoll IL, he also made his senior debut on the fifth tier in 2014 before joining Vålerenga's youth setup. He did not secure a senior contract here, and instead joined second-tier KFUM. After impressing here and representing Norway as a youth and U21 international, he transferred to a first-tier team in 2020, Mjøndalen.

On 5 February 2022, Larsen signed a 3.5-year contract with Russian Premier League club Nizhny Novgorod. He played league matches for the club between February and March.

On 16 March 2022, Larsen suspended his contract with Nizhny Novgorod under a special FIFA rule introduced due to the fallout from the Russian invasion of Ukraine. On 19 March 2022, Larsen signed with BK Häcken in Sweden until 30 June 2022. On 28 June 2022, Larsen extended his contract with BK Häcken by one year.

On 14 June 2023, Larsen signed a four-year contract with NEC in the Netherlands. On 27 August 2024, he returned to BK Häcken on loan until the end of 2024.

In August 2025, Larsen was once again loaned out from NEC, this time to Norwegian club Tromsø on a deal that lasted until the end of the year, with an option to buy. On 26 December 2025, Tromsø announced that they had exercised their option to buy, Larsen signing a two-year deal.

== Career statistics ==
As of 31 August 2026

Appearances and goals by club, season and competition
Club	Season	League			National Cup (Note: Includes Norwegian Cup, Russian Cup, Svenska Cupen, KNVB Cup)		Europe		Other		Total	
Club	Season	Division	Apps	Goals	Apps	Goals	Apps	Goals	Apps	Goals	Apps	Goals
Årvoll	2014	Norwegian Fourth Division	5	0	—		—		—		5	0
Vålerenga 2	2015	Norwegian Second Division	10	1	—		—		—		10	1
Vålerenga 2	2015	Norwegian Second Division	8	2	—		—		—		8	2
Vålerenga 2	2017	Norwegian Second Division	9	0	—		—		—		9	0
Vålerenga 2	Total		27	3	—		—		—		27	3
KFUM	2018	Norwegian Second Division	26	5	2	0	—		4 (Note: Appearances in Norwegian Second Division promotion play-offs)	2	32	7
KFUM	2019	Norwegian First Division	26	9	3	1	—		2 (Note: Appearances in Norwegian First Division promotion play-offs)	1	31	11
KFUM	Total		52	14	5	1	—		6	3	63	18
KFUM 2	2018	Norwegian Third Division	3	1	—		—		—		3	1
Mjøndalen	2020	Eliteserien	28	0	—		—		1 (Note: Appearance in Eliteserien play-offs)	0	29	0
Mjøndalen	2021	Eliteserien	30	8	2	0	—		—		32	8
Mjøndalen	Total		58	8	2	0	—		1	0	61	8
Nizhny Novgorod	2021–22	Russian Premier League	3	0	1	0	—		—		4	0
Häcken (loan)	2022	Allsvenskan	19	4	1	0	—		—		20	4
Häcken (loan)	2023	Allsvenskan	12	5	5	3	0	0	—		17	8
Häcken (loan)	Total		31	9	6	3	0	0	—		37	12
NEC	2023–24	Eredivisie	20	1	3	0	—		—		23	1
NEC	2024–25	Eredivisie	10	0	0	0	—		—		10	0
NEC	Total		30	1	3	0	—		—		33	1
Häcken (loan)	2024	Allsvenskan	11	1	0	0	0	0	—		11	1
Tromsø (loan)	2025	Eliteserien	12	3	1	0	—		—		13	3
Tromsø	2026	Eliteserien	17	1	1	0	6 (Note: Two appearances in UEFA Europa League and four appearances in UEFA Conference League)	0	—		24	1
Tromsø	Total		29	4	2	0	6	0	—		37	4
Career total			249	41	19	4	6	0	7	3	281	48

== Honours ==
BK Häcken

- Allsvenskan: 2022
- Svenska Cupen: 2022–23
