= Erik Stavås Skistad =

Norwegian footballer (born 2001)

Personal information
- Date of birth: 12 June 2001 (age 25)
- Position: Forward

Youth career
- –2015: Konnerud
- 2016–2019: Strømsgodset

Senior career*
Years	Team	Apps	(Gls)
2019–2020	Konnerud	22	(14)
2020–2023	Mjøndalen	50	(6)
- * Club domestic league appearances and goals as of 1 December 2023

Erik Stavås Skistad (born 12 June 2001) is a Norwegian professional footballer.

He started his youth career in Konnerud IL. After a time in Strømsgodset's youth ranks he started his senior career in the 4. divisjon with Konnerud in 2019. In the summer of 2020 he trialled with Mjøndalen and was promptly signed by them. He made his Eliteserien debut in November 2020 against Kristiansund.

He is a younger brother of Kristine Stavås Skistad.
