= Syver Skaar Eriksen =

Norwegian footballer (born 2001)

Personal information
- Date of birth: 29 April 2001 (age 25)
- Position: Midfielder

Team information
- Current team: Arendal
- Number: 2

Youth career
- –2016: Kongsberg
- 2016–2020: Mjøndalen

Senior career*
Years	Team	Apps	(Gls)
2020–2026	Mjøndalen	98	(3)
2026–	Arendal	9	(1)
- * Club domestic league appearances and goals as of 23 July 2026

Syver Skaar Eriksen (born 29 April 2001) is a Norwegian professional footballer who plays for Norwegian Second Division club Arendal.

Hailing from Kongsberg and the club Kongsberg IF, he went to Mjøndalen as a junior and made his senior debut in August 2020 against Start. He scored his first goal in July 2021 against Haugesund.
