= Christian Gauseth =

Norwegian footballer (born 1984)

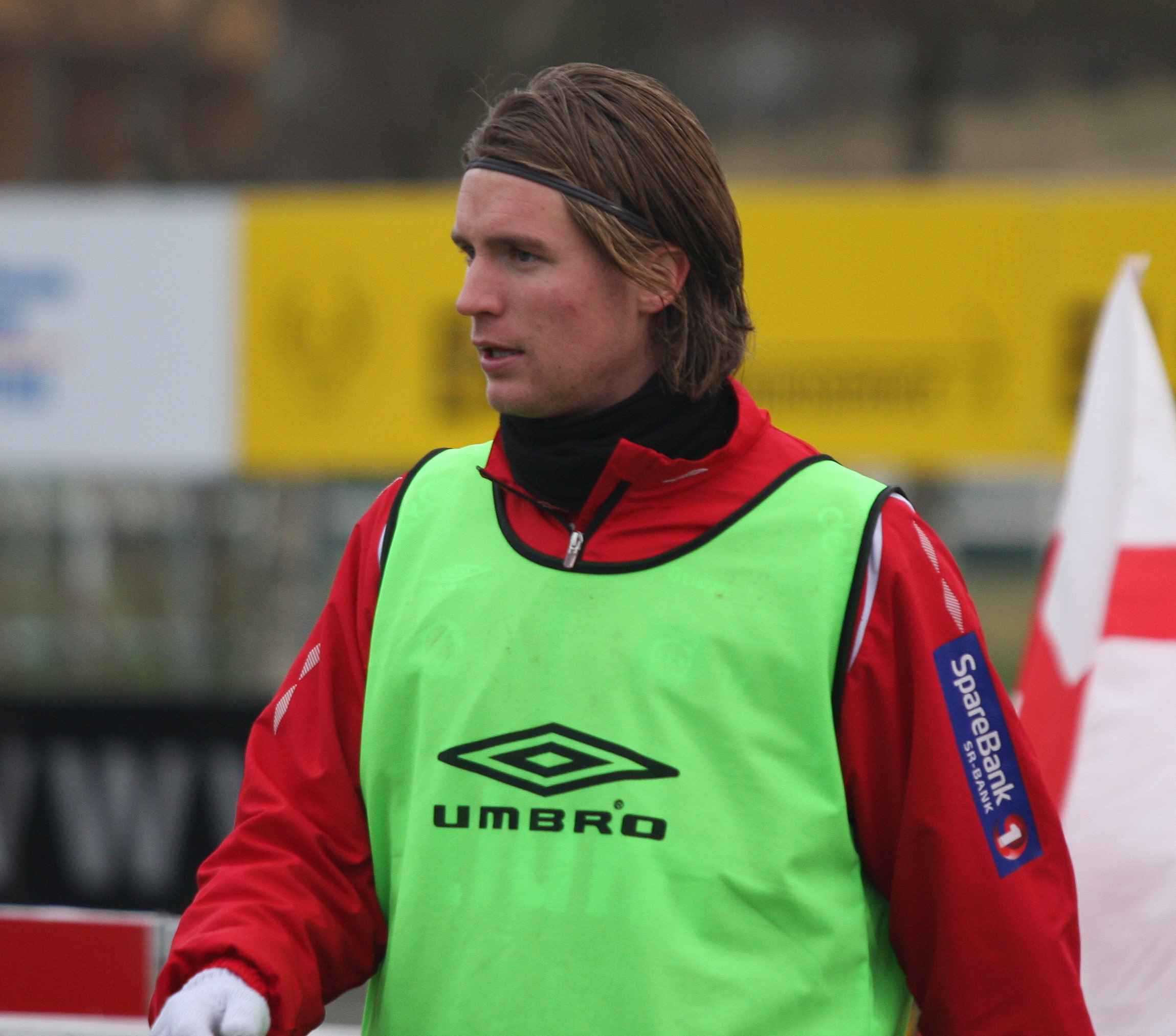

Personal information
- Full name: Christian Gauseth
- Date of birth: 26 June 1984 (age 42)
- Place of birth: Trondheim, Norway
- Height: 1.89 m (6 ft 2 1/2 in)
- Position: Midfielder

Senior career*
Years	Team	Apps	(Gls)
2007	Molde	24	(2)
2008–2009	Bryne	45	(3)
2010–2012	Alta	60	(7)
2013–2021	Mjøndalen	206	(30)
- * Club domestic league appearances and goals

Christian Gauseth (born 26 June 1984) is a Norwegian former professional footballer who played as a midfielder. He played for Molde, Bryne, Alta and Mjøndalen.

== Club career ==
Born in Molde, Gauseth joined Molde's first-team squad ahead of the 2007 season.

== Career statistics ==
=== Club ===
As of match played 15 August 2021

Appearances and goals by club, season and competition
Club	Season	League			National Cup		Continental		Total	
Club	Season	Division	Apps	Goals	Apps	Goals	Apps	Goals	Apps	Goals
Molde	2007	1. divisjon	24	2	0	0	-		24	2
Molde	Total		24	2	0	0	-	-	24	2
Bryne	2008	1. divisjon	26	2	0	0	-		26	2
Bryne	2009	1. divisjon	19	1	2	1	-		21	2
Bryne	Total		45	3	2	1	-	-	47	4
Alta	2010	1. divisjon	24	5	2	0	-		26	5
Alta	2011	1. divisjon	27	2	4	0	-		31	2
Alta	2012	1. divisjon	9	0	0	0	-		9	0
Alta	Total		60	7	6	0	-	-	66	7
Mjøndalen	2013	1. divisjon	26	2	4	1	-		30	3
Mjøndalen	2014	1. divisjon	26	7	3	2	-		29	9
Mjøndalen	2015	Tippeligaen	28	4	4	2	-		32	6
Mjøndalen	2016	OBOS-ligaen	26	6	1	0	-		27	6
Mjøndalen	2017	OBOS-ligaen	18	1	3	1	-		21	2
Mjøndalen	2018	OBOS-ligaen	29	4	3	0	-		32	4
Mjøndalen	2019	Eliteserien	23	5	2	0	-		25	5
Mjøndalen	2020	Eliteserien	18	1	0	0	-		18	1
Mjøndalen	2021	Eliteserien	12	0	1	0	-		13	0
Mjøndalen	Total		206	30	21	6	-	-	227	36
Career total			335	42	29	7	-	-	364	49
