= Markus Nakkim =

Norwegian footballer (born 1996)

Personal information
- Full name: Markus Lund Nakkim
- Date of birth: 21 July 1996 (age 30)
- Place of birth: Moss, Norway
- Height: 1.87 m (6 ft 2 in)
- Position: Centre-back

Team information
- Current team: Valur
- Number: 4

Youth career
- KFUM Oslo
- Vålerenga

Senior career*
Years	Team	Apps	(Gls)
2013–2019	Vålerenga 2	61	(10)
2015–2020	Vålerenga	29	(1)
2016	→ Strømmen (loan)	14	(0)
2018	→ Viking (loan)	28	(0)
2020–2022	Mjøndalen	69	(5)
2022	HamKam	5	(0)
2023–2025	Orange County SC	52	(3)
2025–	Valur	38	(2)

International career^{‡}
2017	Norway U21	2	(0)
- * Club domestic league appearances and goals as of 16 November 2026 ‡ National team caps and goals as of 28 March 2017

Markus Lund Nakkim (born 21 July 1996) is a Norwegian professional footballer who plays as a defender for Valur.

== Club career ==
Nakkim joined Vålerenga's youth academy in his mid teens, having previously been at KFUM Oslo. In 2012, he won the NTF U16 Cup while playing for Vålerenga's youth team. He signed his first professional contract with the first team ahead of the 2015 season. On 17 April 2015, Nakkim made his league debut against Haugesund.

In February 2018, Nakkim joined Viking on loan until the end of the 2018 season.

In January 2025 news started to emerge that Icelandic giants Valur were interested in Nakkims services and his arrival was announced on January 15, 2025.

== Career statistics ==
As of match played 4 July 2022

Appearances and goals by club, season and competition
Club	Season	League			Cup		Continental		Other		Total	
Club	Season	Division	Apps	Goals	Apps	Goals	Apps	Goals	Apps	Goals	Apps	Goals
Vålerenga	2015	Eliteserien	8	0	2	0	—		—		10	0
Vålerenga	2016	Eliteserien	6	0	1	0	—		—		7	0
Vålerenga	2017	Eliteserien	8	0	2	0	—		—		10	0
Vålerenga	2018	Eliteserien	0	0	0	0	—		—		0	0
Vålerenga	2019	Eliteserien	7	1	2	0	—		—		9	1
Vålerenga	Total		29	1	7	0	—		—		36	1
Strømmen (loan)	2016	1. divisjon	14	0	3	1	—		—		17	1
Viking (loan)	2018	1. divisjon	28	0	1	0	—		—		29	0
Mjøndalen	2020	Eliteserien	30	2	—		—		1 (Note: Appearance in relegation play-offs.)	1	31	3
Mjøndalen	2021	Eliteserien	29	3	2	2	—		—		31	5
Mjøndalen	2022	OBOS-ligaen	10	0	1	0	—		—		11	0
Mjøndalen	Total		69	5	3	2	—		1	1	73	8
Valur	2025	Besta Deildin	2	0	—		—		5	0	7	0
Valur	Total		2	0	0	0	—		5	0	7	0
Career total			142	6	14	3	0	0	6	1	162	10
