= COVID-19 pandemic in Norway =

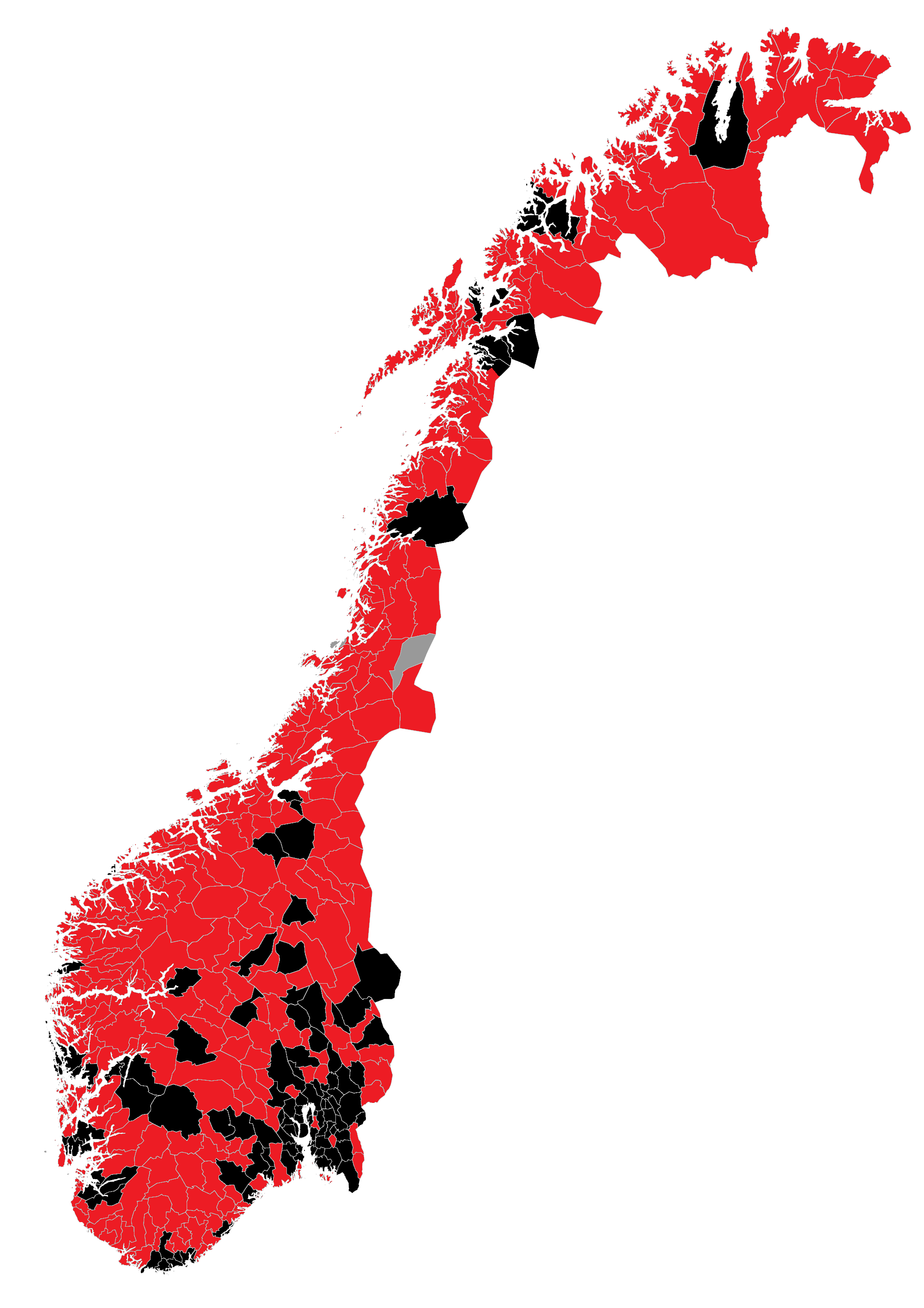
- Map of municipalities with confirmed coronavirus cases (red) and deaths (black) and Recovered (green) as of 10 May
- Disease: COVID-19
- Pathogen: SARS-CoV-2
- Location: Norway
- First outbreak: Austria and Italy
- Index case: Tromsø
- Arrival date: 26 February 2020 (6 years, 8 months and 1 day ago)
- Confirmed cases: 1,552,735
- Hospitalized cases: 314
- Critical cases: 45
- Ventilator cases: 28
- Recovered: 1,476,471
- Deaths: 5,732
- Fatality rate: 0.2%

Government website
- www.fhi.no/en/id/infectious-diseases/coronavirus/

The COVID-19 pandemic in Norway resulted in 1,552,735 confirmed cases of COVID-19 and 5,732 deaths.

On 26 February 2020, the virus was confirmed to have spread to Norway. The number of cases increased rapidly during the month of March, prompting a number of legal measures aiming to achieve physical distancing to be introduced on 12 March. The first death attributed to COVID-19 was documented on the same day. Most confirmed cases that were traced to outside Norway were Norwegian tourists returning from Austria and Italy.

In March 2020, a senior Norwegian Institute of Public Health consultant said one of the major reasons why the mortality rate was significantly lower than in other European countries (such as Italy, Spain, the UK) was the high number of tests performed in Norway. A commission was established in the early days of the pandemic to track and analyse every aspect of the nation's response to the pandemic. As of late June 2022 Norway's death per capita rate was the lowest in Scandinavia.

== Background ==
On 12 January 2020, the World Health Organization (WHO) confirmed that a novel coronavirus was the cause of a respiratory illness in a cluster of people in Wuhan, Hubei, China, who had initially come to the attention of the WHO on 31 December 2019.

Unlike SARS of 2003, the case fatality ratio for COVID-19 has been much lower, but the transmission has been significantly greater, with a significant total death toll.

== Timeline ==
Cases

Deaths

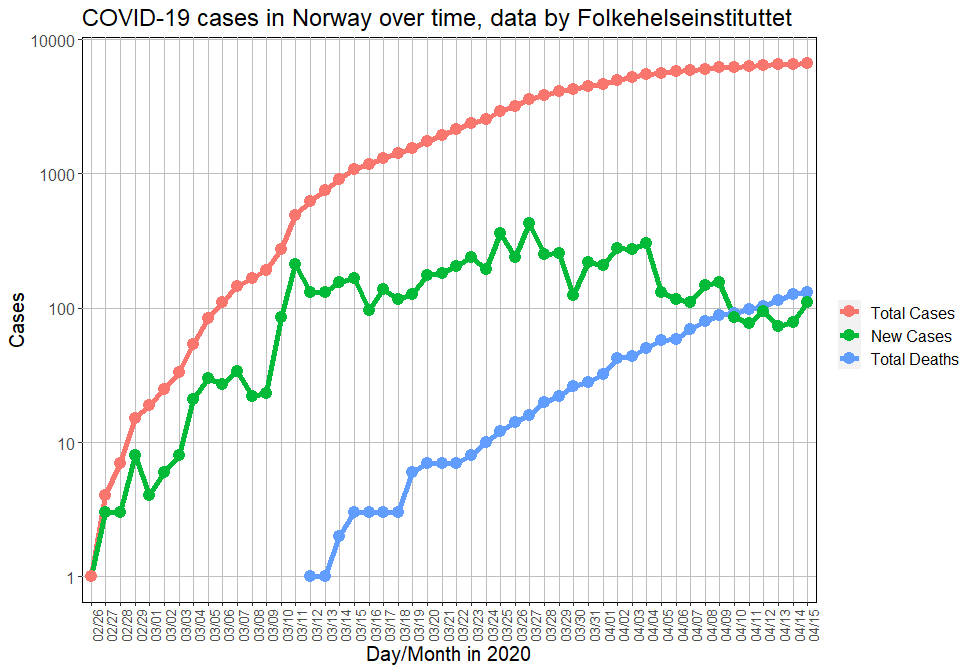
Semi-log plot of COVID-19 total cases, new cases and total deaths per-day in Norway.

=== February 2020 ===
On 26 February, Norway confirmed the first case of COVID-19. The Norwegian Institute of Public Health announced that someone tested positive for SARS-CoV-2 after returning from China the previous week. The female patient was asymptomatic and in good health. She underwent a voluntary isolation at her home in Tromsø.

On 27 February, the Norwegian Institute of Public Health announced that three more people were confirmed positive for SARS-CoV-2. Two of them lived in Oslo and were linked to the outbreak in Italy. The other lived in Bærum and was linked to the outbreak in Iran. All of them underwent a voluntary isolation at home.

On 28 February, an individual from Bergen and an employee of Oslo University Hospital, Ullevål, tested positive and were placed in home isolation. Both had visited Northern Italy. Six cases were confirmed in the country on the day. On 29 February, there were 15 confirmed cases in Norway.

=== March 2020 ===
By 1 March, a total of 19 cases were confirmed. Mahad Ahmed Musse, the Chief of the Ullevål hospital in Oslo, stated that there are potentially over 100 people who came in contact with an infected staff member.

On 3 March, there were 25 confirmed cases in Norway, with five from Vestland. An employee at the Horisont shopping center in Åsane was confirmed to have been infected by the virus, said center manager Lise Færøvik.

On 4 March, there were 56 confirmed cases in Norway, all of which are linked to known outbreaks abroad.

By 10 March, the number of confirmed cases in Norway had spiked to 400, and a rising number of those cases could not be traced to foreign travel or any known person infected, indicating community transmission had started in Norway.

On 12 March, a national lockdown was announced, effective from 18:00 the same day. For two weeks, schools, kindergartens, fitness centres, hair salons, etc. were closed. Sports and cultural events and gatherings were banned and restrictions applied to restaurants. These measures were in line with those introduced in other European countries such as Denmark and Italy. The same day Norway had its first death due to the COVID-19 virus. The victim was an elderly person who died at Oslo University Hospital.

As of 13 March, Norway introduced a ban on visits to Norway through Oslo airport. Norwegian and Nordic citizens, foreign residents in Norway and people continuing to another country are allowed anyway. Other people are dismissed and sent home as soon as possible and put in quarantine until then. On 16 March this was extended to all borders of Norway and Nordic non-Norwegian citizens. Domestic travel continues without any restriction. On 14 March, the second and third deaths caused by COVID-19 were reported.

=== April 2020 ===
On 6 April, the Norwegian Health Minister announced that the outbreak was "under control" and that the reproduction rate of Sars-CoV-2 had dwindled to 0.7 in the country.

=== May 2020 ===
As of 14 May 2020, there were 8,196 people recorded as infected with the virus, with a subsequent death rate of 2.83% (232 deaths to 8,196 infected). More than half of the deaths occurred in nursing homes, parallel to the average age of 82 (of the infected & deaths combined). Intense, nationwide testing was reportedly much higher than that of other countries, causing the National Library of Medicine to comment on Norway's efficient and pragmatic tactics when dealing with the disease. NIH authors Tom Christensen and Per Lægreid praised the response of Norway's government, stating that "[c]ompared with many other countries, Norway has performed well in handling the crisis."

=== August 2020 ===
An outbreak of coronavirus on the MS Roald Amundsen ship infected at least five passengers and thirty-six crew. Health authorities fear the ship could have infected dozens of towns and villages along Norway's western coast. There were 209 guests on the first voyage and 178 guests on the second voyage. All 158 crew members on MS Roald Amundsen were tested and 122 were negative. The municipality of Tromsø urged anyone who traveled on the ship or had any contact with the ship to get in touch with health authorities. A total of 69 municipalities in Norway were affected, Norwegian news agency NTB reported. A German cruise ship during the week of 26 July – 1 August set sail from Hamburg, testing procedures for how cruise ships can operate safely during the pandemic. The ship sailed with less than 50% capacity and only went on a four-day trip at sea with no stops at other ports.

=== October 2020 ===
35 variations of the virus have been found in Norway. As of 18 October 2020, Folkehelseinstituttet has counted one more likely mutation.

Known mutations in Norway include:

- S477N with genetic subgroup B. 1.5 (in Norway, also called "the tour bus virus" or "the bus tour virus"), has been found elsewhere in Europe and in Australia.
- N439K with genetic subgroup B. 1.160

=== April 2021 ===
In April 2021 media noted that while residents of Oslo had to live under severe restrictions, infected people were brought to Norway on airline flights and about 57% of those hospitalised due to COVID-19 were immigrants to Norway who had returned from holiday trips to their home countries such as Pakistan, Somalia, Iraq, Iran and Afghanistan. According to airport employees, many passengers left the airport without getting tested first. According to national statistics, 16% of all tested Pakistani-Norwegians and 14% of all tested Somali Norwegians had tested positive for COVID-19.

In April 2021, daily newspaper Aftenposten reported that one in four flights from Dubai and Istanbul to Oslo Airport carried infected passengers. Since the start of 2021, infected passengers had been detected on 110 flights to Norway, of which 25 came from Poland and 15 arrived from Turkey. According to the Norwegian Institute of Public Health, Turkish Airlines flights from Istanbul, Emirates flights from Dubai, and Air Serbia flights from Belgrade had the worst records.

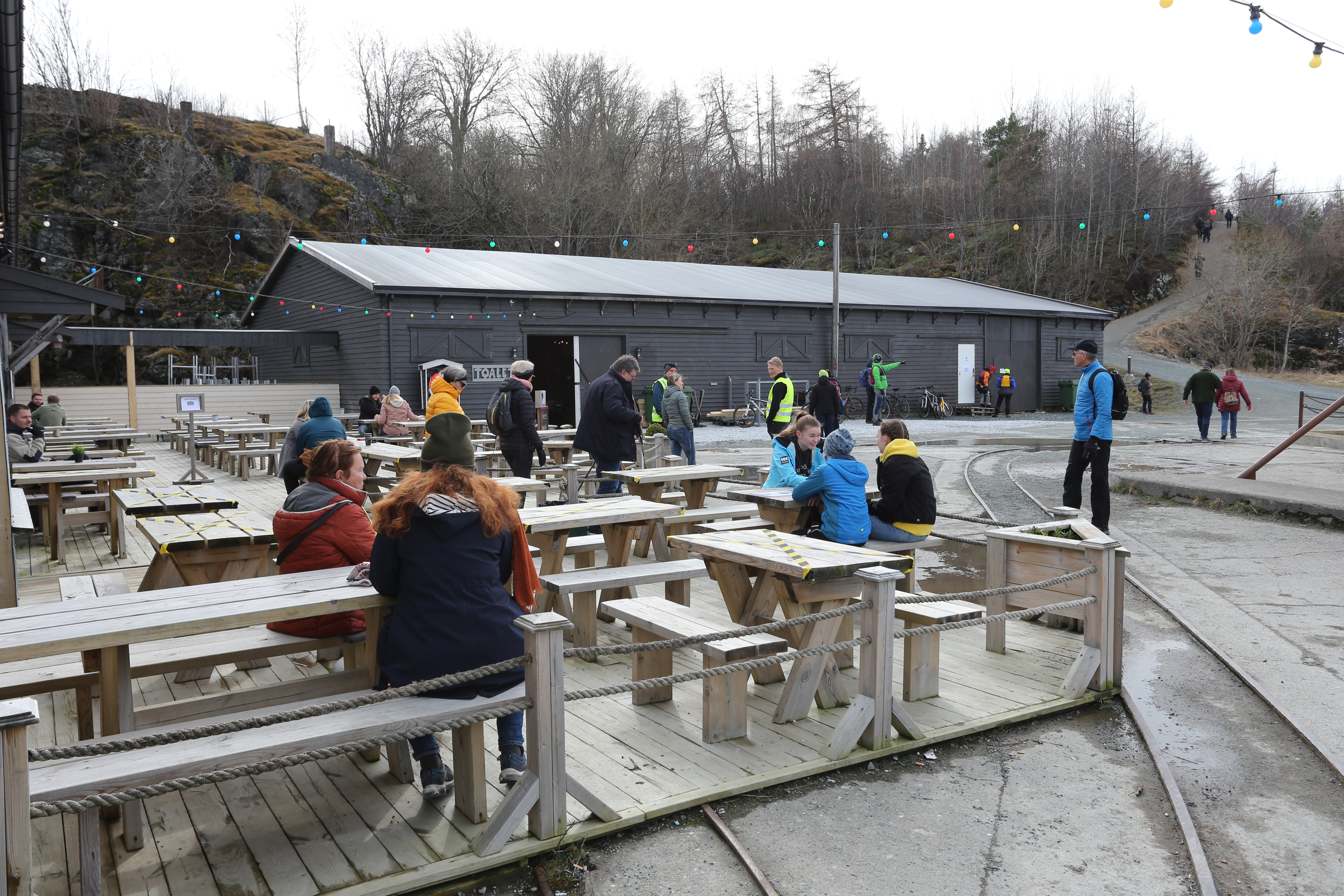
Some restaurants (like Ladekaia in Trondheim) are open in April 2020, but the number of patrons allowed inside is limited and every other table is closed to enforce social distancing between customers.

=== September 2021 ===
As one of Erna Solberg's last acts as Prime Minister after the parliamentary election, Norway officially reopened on 25 September, with most restrictions being lifted.

== Prevention measures and response ==
The Norwegian Directorate of Health introduced a number of measures from Thursday 12 March 2020:

- All educational institutions were closed and organized sports activities were to be discontinued.
- A number of events and businesses were closed, including cultural events, sports events, gyms and swimming pools. All establishments in the hospitality industry such as bars, pubs and clubs other than those serving food were to close, and any establishment serving food would have to ensure that visitors could stay at least one meter apart.
- Healthcare professionals working with patient care were prohibited from traveling abroad until 20 April 2020. The ban applied to both business travel and private travel.
- Everyone who had returned from trips outside Sweden and Finland since 27 February were to quarantine, regardless of whether they showed symptoms or not.
- Leisure travel was strongly discouraged. The Directorate discouraged traveling to work unless strictly necessary and encouraged avoiding public transport if possible, as well as avoiding crowded places.
- People were requested not to visit others in institutions with vulnerable groups (the elderly, psychiatry, prison, etc.) and generally encouraged to limiting close contact with others.
- The public transport schedule was to run as normal, to ensure that people with critical social functions could get to and from work and be able to distance themselves from each other.

On 16 March, non-residents were banned from entering Norway.

As of 19 March, residents were prohibited from staying in cabins outside their home municipalities, in order to avoid putting strain on rural medical infrastructure. People suspected or confirmed to be infected must follow stricter home isolation rules. The government established fines for people violating home quarantine and home isolation rules or organizing events.

=== Economic policy ===
Many institutions were closed in order to fight the outbreak, which led to increased unemployment. Norges Bank first cut the national prime rate by a half point to 1.0% on 13 March, and the following week cut the prime rate again down to 0.25%.

== Vaccine ==
Norway began administering Pfizer-BioNTech's COVID-19 vaccine on 27 December 2020. 67-year-old Svein Andersen from Oslo, Norway was the first person in Norway to receive the vaccine.

As of 17 April 2021, 870,524 people in Norway have received the first dose of the COVID-19 vaccine and 296,458 are fully vaccinated, primarily the elderly, healthcare workers and younger people at risk. All of the cases with potential links to the vaccine reported as of 14 January occurred among severely frail elderly people with serious diseases. However, a causality to vaccination could not have been linked.

Norway is also closely monitoring side effects, with both reports from healthcare professionals and the public being registered in a common database. This should allow for a good overview of the situation once the vaccine is distributed in the general population, as well as an efficient collaboration with other countries.

== Statistics ==
=== Charts ===
View source data.

==== Deaths per day ====
View source data.

=== Growth trajectory of cases in Norway ===
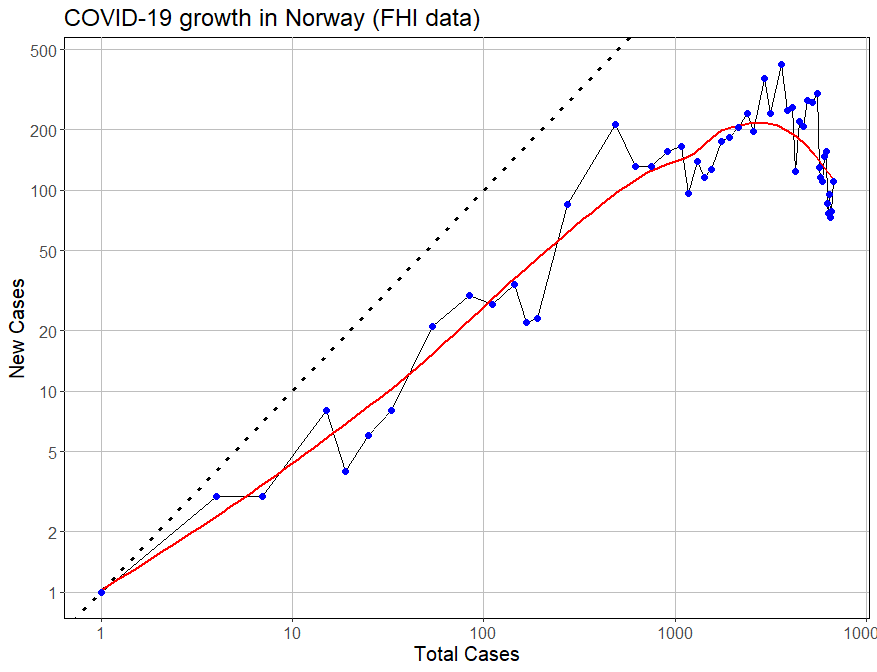

== See also ==
- COVID-19 pandemic in Svalbard
- COVID-19 pandemic in Europe
- COVID-19 pandemic by country and territory
