= Ole Amund Sveen =

Norwegian footballer (born 1990)

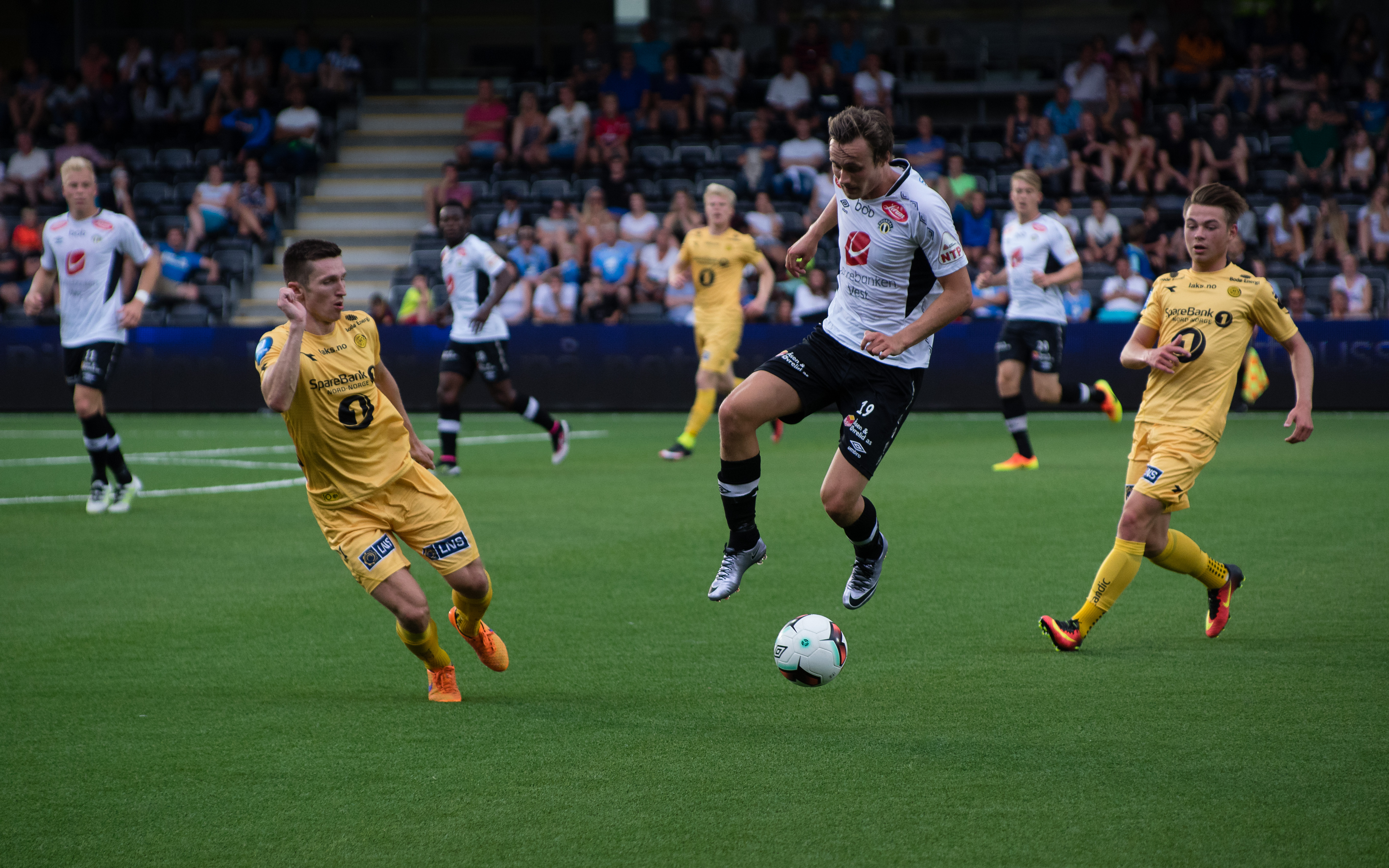
- Ole Amund Sveen scoring a goal against Bodø-Glimt on July 24, 2016.

Personal information
- Date of birth: 5 January 1990 (age 36)
- Place of birth: Gjøvik, Norway
- Height: 1.80 m (5 ft 11 in)
- Position: Forward

Team information
- Current team: Raufoss
- Number: 16

Youth career
- Redalen

Senior career*
Years	Team	Apps	(Gls)
2008–2011	Raufoss	71	(8)
2012–2013	Strømsgodset	4	(0)
2013	→ Ham Kam (loan)	11	(3)
2014–2015	Hødd	57	(9)
2016–2019	Sogndal	42	(9)
2019–2020	Bodø/Glimt	18	(1)
2020–2024	Mjøndalen	109	(5)
2025–	Raufoss	22	(2)
- * Club domestic league appearances and goals as of 1 December 2025

Ole Amund Sveen (born 5 January 1990) is a Norwegian footballer who plays as a forward for Raufoss.

He started his career in Redalen before joining Raufoss, a third-tier team. He was discovered and signed by Strømsgodset, for whom he played two league games in Tippeligaen 2012 and an additional two in Tippeligaen 2013. In 2013, he was loaned out to Ham Kam, before playing two full seasons in Hødd. In 2016, he joined Sogndal, and started his first Norwegian Premier League game in March 2016 against Bodø/Glimt.

Sveen had been on trial with Sogndal as early as 2011.

== Career statistics ==
=== Club ===
As of match played 13 September 2025

Appearances and goals by club, season and competition
Club	Season	League			National cup		Continental		Total	
Club	Season	Division	Apps	Goals	Apps	Goals	Apps	Goals	Apps	Goals
Raufoss	2008	2. divisjon	11	0	0	0	–		11	0
Raufoss	2009	Fair Play ligaen	21	3	0	0	–		21	3
Raufoss	2010	Fair Play ligaen	18	5	0	0	–		18	5
Raufoss	2011	Fair Play ligaen	21	0	0	0	–		21	0
Raufoss	Total		71	8	0	0	0	0	71	8
Strømsgodset	2012	Tippeligaen	2	0	3	0	–		5	0
Strømsgodset	2013	Tippeligaen	2	0	1	0	2	0	5	0
Strømsgodset	Total		4	0	4	0	2	0	10	0
HamKam (loan)	2013	Adeccoligaen	11	3	0	0	–		11	3
Hødd	2014	1. divisjon	28	4	1	0	–		29	4
Hødd	2015	OBOS-ligaen	29	5	3	1	–		32	6
Hødd	Total		57	9	4	1	0	0	61	10
Sogndal	2016	Tippeligaen	28	7	0	0	–		28	6
Sogndal	2017	Eliteserien	2	0	0	0	–		2	0
Sogndal	2018	OBOS-ligaen	0	0	0	0	–		0	0
Sogndal	2019	OBOS-ligaen	12	2	2	2	–		14	4
Sogndal	Total		42	9	2	2	0	0	44	11
Bodø/Glimt	2019	Eliteserien	10	1	0	0	–		10	1
Bodø/Glimt	2020	Eliteserien	8	0	0	0	2	0	10	0
Bodø/Glimt	Total		18	1	0	0	2	0	20	1
Mjøndalen	2020	Eliteserien	9	1	0	0	–		9	1
Mjøndalen	2021	Eliteserien	25	1	1	0	–		26	1
Mjøndalen	2022	OBOS-ligaen	27	0	1	0	–		28	0
Mjøndalen	2023	OBOS-ligaen	22	0	2	0	–		24	0
Mjøndalen	2024	OBOS-ligaen	26	3	0	0	–		26	3
Mjøndalen	Total		109	5	4	0	0	0	113	5
Raufoss	2025	OBOS-ligaen	20	2	1	0	–		21	2
Raufoss	Total		20	2	1	0	0	0	21	1
Career total			332	37	15	3	4	0	351	40

== Honours ==
Bodø/Glimt

- Eliteserien: 2020
