= Alexander Betten Hansen =

Norwegian footballer (born 1996)

Personal information
- Date of birth: 1 November 1996 (age 29)
- Place of birth: Skien, Norway
- Height: 1.73 m (5 ft 8 in)
- Position: Defender

Youth career
- –2015: Odd

Senior career*
Years	Team	Apps	(Gls)
2015–2017	Fram Larvik	59	(0)
2018–2020	Mjøndalen	49	(0)
2021–2022	Fredrikstad	40	(1)
- * Club domestic league appearances and goals as of 29 October 2022

Alexander Betten Hansen (born 1 November 1996) is a Norwegian former football defender.

He played youth, B and C team football for Odd until the summer of 2015, when he moved on to Fram Larvik. He joined Mjøndalen in 2018, helped them win promotion to 2019 Eliteserien and made his Eliteserien debut in June 2019.
