= List of Norwegian football transfers winter 2020–21 =

This is a list of Norwegian football transfers in the 2020–2021 winter transfer window by club. Only clubs of the 2021 Eliteserien and 2021 1. divisjon are included.

Because of the COVID-related postponement of the league kickoff, the winter transfer window which was supposed to have lasted from 15 January to 7 April, was split in two: 15 January to 24 March and 29 April to 12 May.

== Eliteserien ==
=== Bodø/Glimt ===
In: Note: Flags indicate national team as defined under FIFA eligibility rules; some limited exceptions apply. Players may hold more than one non-FIFA nationality.

No.	Pos.	Nation	Player
11	DF	SWE	Axel Lindahl (from (Sweden) Degerfors)
19	MF	NOR	Sondre Brunstad Fet (from Aalesund, previously on loan)
20	FW	NOR	Erik Botheim (from Rosenborg)
21	DF	NOR	Vegard Kongsro (from Ull/Kisa)
24	FW	NOR	Lasse Selvåg Nordås (from Strømmen)
26	DF	NOR	Sigurd Kvile (from Åsane)
27	MF	NOR	Sondre Sørli (from Kristiansund)
28	FW	BRA	Pernambuco (on loan from (Ukraine) Lviv)
31	MF	NOR	Kent Malic Swaleh (promoted from junior squad)
32	FW	NOR	Elias Hoff Melkersen (promoted from junior squad, previously on loan at Hødd)
33	FW	NOR	Mads Fagerli Halsøy (promoted from junior squad)
35	MF	NOR	Adan Abadala Hussein (loan return from Stjørdals/Blink)
—	MF	NOR	Nicklas Olai Karlsen Sundsvåg (promoted from junior squad)

Out: Note: Flags indicate national team as defined under FIFA eligibility rules; some limited exceptions apply. Players may hold more than one non-FIFA nationality.

No.	Pos.	Nation	Player
6	DF	NOR	Isak Helstad Amundsen (on loan to Tromsø)
10	MF	DEN	Philip Zinckernagel (to (England) Watford)
15	FW	NOR	Runar Hauge (on loan to Stjørdals-Blink)
21	FW	DEN	Kasper Junker (to (Japan) Urawa Red Diamonds)
24	DF	NOR	Aleksander Foosnæs (to Stjørdals-Blink)
25	GK	NOR	Marcus Ellingsen Andersen (on loan to Fløya)
32	FW	NOR	Elias Hoff Melkersen (on loan to Ranheim, previously on loan at Hødd)
—	MF	NOR	Nicklas Olai Karlsen Sundsvåg (on loan to Fram)

=== Brann ===
In: Note: Flags indicate national team as defined under FIFA eligibility rules; some limited exceptions apply. Players may hold more than one non-FIFA nationality.

No.	Pos.	Nation	Player
6	DF	LUX	Lars Krogh Gerson (from (Spain) Racing Santander)
12	GK	NOR	Eirik Johansen (loan return from Kristiansund)
14	FW	SWE	Moonga Simba (from (Sweden) Västerås)
15	MF	NOR	Kasper Skaanes (from Start)
17	MF	NOR	Filip Delaveris (from (Netherlands) Vitesse)
18	MF	NOR	David Møller Wolfe (loan return from Åsane)
20	FW	NOR	Aune Heggebø (loan return from Øygarden)
22	DF	SEN	Vieux Sané (free transfer)
25	MF	NOR	Niklas Jensen Wassberg (from Fyllingsdalen)
31	MF	NOR	Isak Hjorteseth (from Fyllingsdalen)

Out: Note: Flags indicate national team as defined under FIFA eligibility rules; some limited exceptions apply. Players may hold more than one non-FIFA nationality.

No.	Pos.	Nation	Player
2	DF	EST	Taijo Teniste (to (Estonia) Tammeka)
4	DF	ISL	Jón Gudni Fjóluson (to (Sweden) Hammarby)
6	DF	SWE	Jesper Löfgren (to (Sweden) Djurgården, previously on loan at (Sweden) Mjällby)
8	MF	NOR	Fredrik Haugen (to (Cyprus) AEK Larnaca)
10	MF	BIH	Amer Ordagić (to Sandefjord)
14	FW	NOR	Erlend Hustad (on loan to Sandnes Ulf)
15	DF	CRC	Bismar Acosta (to (Costa Rica) Cartaginés)
17	MF	FRO	Gilli Rólantsson (to Odd)
20	FW	NOR	Marcus Mehnert (to Ranheim)
22	DF	NOR	Vegard Strønen Skeie (retired, previously on loan at Øygarden)
27	MF	NOR	Sander Svendsen (loan return to (Denmark) OB)
30	GK	COM	Ali Ahamada (released)
32	DF	NOR	Emil Kalsaas (to Åsane, previously on loan)
35	DF	NOR	Nicholas Marthinussen (to Jerv, previously on loan at Notodden)

=== Haugesund ===
In: Note: Flags indicate national team as defined under FIFA eligibility rules; some limited exceptions apply. Players may hold more than one non-FIFA nationality.

No.	Pos.	Nation	Player
7	DF	DEN	Peter Therkildsen (from (Denmark) Horsens, previously on loan)
9	FW	NOR	Sondre Liseth (from Mjøndalen)
12	GK	NOR	Egil Selvik (from Odd)
25	MF	SEN	Alioune Ndour (from Sogndal)
27	MF	NOR	Mads Berg Sande (loan return from Sandnes Ulf)

Out: Note: Flags indicate national team as defined under FIFA eligibility rules; some limited exceptions apply. Players may hold more than one non-FIFA nationality.

No.	Pos.	Nation	Player
3	DF	CIV	Benjamin Karamoko (to Sarpsborg 08, previously on loan at Aalesund)
7	MF	NOR	Christian Grindheim (retired)
9	FW	MLI	Ibrahima Koné (to Sarpsborg 08)
11	FW	DEN	Alexander Ammitzbøll (loan return to (Denmark) AGF)
20	FW	DEN	Oliver Klitten (loan return to (Denmark) AaB)
93	DF	NOR	Dennis Horneland (to Vard Haugesund, previously on loan)

=== Kristiansund ===
In: Note: Flags indicate national team as defined under FIFA eligibility rules; some limited exceptions apply. Players may hold more than one non-FIFA nationality.

No.	Pos.	Nation	Player
2	DF	NOR	Snorre Strand Nilsen (from Raufoss)
8	MF	NOR	Sander Kartum (from Stjørdals-Blink)
9	MF	DEN	Agon Muçolli (from (Denmark) Fredericia)
12	GK	SWE	Elias Hadaya (from Levanger)
15	DF	NOR	Erlend Sivertsen (loan return from Tromsø)
17	FW	ISL	Brynjólfur Willumsson (from (Iceland) Breiðablik)
25	FW	NOR	Torgil Øwre Gjertsen (from (Poland) Wisła Płock)

Out: Note: Flags indicate national team as defined under FIFA eligibility rules; some limited exceptions apply. Players may hold more than one non-FIFA nationality.

No.	Pos.	Nation	Player
4	DF	FRA	Christophe Psyché (to (Cyprus) AEL Limassol)
9	FW	NOR	Amahl Pellegrino (to (Saudi Arabia) Damac)
14	MF	NOR	Horenus Tadesse (on loan to Sandnes Ulf)
24	MF	NOR	Sondre Sørli (to Bodø/Glimt)
25	GK	NOR	Eirik Johansen (loan return to Brann)
27	MF	NOR	Sander Lille-Løvø (on loan to Brattvåg, previously on loan at Levanger)
28	MF	NOR	Noah Solskjær (on loan to Sogndal)
30	GK	SEN	Serigne Mor Mbaye (on loan to Sogndal, previously on loan at HamKam)
33	DF	NOR	Kjetil Holand Tøsse (to Stjørdals-Blink)

=== Lillestrøm ===
In: Note: Flags indicate national team as defined under FIFA eligibility rules; some limited exceptions apply. Players may hold more than one non-FIFA nationality.

No.	Pos.	Nation	Player
1	GK	BEL	Álex Craninx (on loan from Molde)
5	DF	NOR	Vetle Dragsnes (from Mjøndalen)
6	MF	FIN	Kaan Kairinen (from (Denmark) FC Midtjylland, previously on loan)
7	FW	NOR	Pål André Helland (from Rosenborg)
9	FW	NOR	Kent Håvard Eriksen (from Sandnes Ulf)
15	DF	NOR	Josef Baccay (loan return from Fredrikstad)
16	MF	NGR	Charles Ezeh (loan return from Øygarden)
17	FW	NOR	Jonatan Braut Brunes (from Florø, previously on loan)
19	MF	NOR	Uranik Seferi (from Kvik Halden)
23	MF	NOR	Gjermund Åsen (on loan from Rosenborg)
25	MF	NOR	Eskil Edh (promoted from junior squad)
30	DF	NGR	Igoh Ogbu (from Sogndal)

Out: Note: Flags indicate national team as defined under FIFA eligibility rules; some limited exceptions apply. Players may hold more than one non-FIFA nationality.

No.	Pos.	Nation	Player
5	DF	NOR	Simen Rafn (to Aalesund)
7	MF	NOR	Torbjørn Kallevåg (to Aalesund)
9	FW	ISL	Tryggvi Hrafn Haraldsson (to (Iceland) Valur)
16	FW	ISL	Björn Bergmann Sigurðarson (to Molde)
17	FW	NOR	Kristoffer Ødemarksbakken (on loan to Aalesund, previously on loan at Ull/Kisa)
21	MF	NOR	Magnus Nordengen Knudsen (on loan to Ull/Kisa)
23	DF	NOR	Marius Amundsen (retired)
24	DF	NOR	Erik Tobias Sandberg (on loan to Jerv)
25	GK	BEL	Jo Coppens (to (Germany) SpVgg Unterhaching)
28	MF	NOR	Apipon Tongnoy (on loan to Skeid)
29	GK	NOR	Emil Ødegaard (on loan to Stjørdals-Blink, previously on loan at Grorud)
33	DF	NOR	Aleksander Melgalvis (to HamKam)
88	FW	ISL	Arnor Smarason (to (Iceland) Valur)

=== Mjøndalen ===
In: Note: Flags indicate national team as defined under FIFA eligibility rules; some limited exceptions apply. Players may hold more than one non-FIFA nationality.

No.	Pos.	Nation	Player
2	MF	NOR	Sebastian Sebulonsen (on loan from Viking)
5	DF	NOR	Sivert Engh Øverby (from Fana)
3	DF	NOR	Nikolas Walstad (from Ull/Kisa)
9	FW	NOR	Benjamin Stokke (from Vålerenga)
13	GK	NOR	Erik Hejer (promoted from junior squad)
21	FW	NOR	Alfred Scriven (loan return from Asker)
30	GK	NOR	Idar Lysgård (from Skeid)

Out: Note: Flags indicate national team as defined under FIFA eligibility rules; some limited exceptions apply. Players may hold more than one non-FIFA nationality.

No.	Pos.	Nation	Player
2	DF	NED	Quint Jansen (to Aalesund)
3	DF	NOR	Vetle Dragsnes (to Lillestrøm)
5	DF	NOR	Alexander Betten Hansen (to Fredrikstad)
9	FW	NOR	Sondre Liseth (to Haugesund)
14	MF	CIV	Vamouti Diomande (released)
15	DF	NOR	Mathias Fredriksen (released)
16	MF	ISL	Dagur Dan Þórhallsson (on loan to (Iceland) Fylkir)
18	FW	NOR	Andreas Hellum (to Arendal)
30		NOR	Aristide Sagbakken (released)
32	GK	POR	Jorge Vieira (released)

=== Molde ===
In: Note: Flags indicate national team as defined under FIFA eligibility rules; some limited exceptions apply. Players may hold more than one non-FIFA nationality.

No.	Pos.	Nation	Player
10	FW	ISL	Björn Bergmann Sigurðarson (from Lillestrøm)
15	FW	NOR	Magnus Grødem (from Sandnes Ulf)
20	FW	CIV	Datro Fofana (from (Ivory Coast) AFAD)
25	MF	NOR	Emil Breivik (loan return from Raufoss)
34	GK	NOR	Oliver Petersen (promoted from junior squad)
40	DF	NOR	Adrian Ugelvik (promoted from junior squad)

Out: Note: Flags indicate national team as defined under FIFA eligibility rules; some limited exceptions apply. Players may hold more than one non-FIFA nationality.

No.	Pos.	Nation	Player
9	MF	SWE	Mattias Moström (retired)
10	FW	NGR	Leke James (to (Saudi Arabia) Al Qadsiah)
12	GK	BEL	Álex Craninx (on loan to Lillestrøm)
15	MF	NOR	Tobias Christensen (to Vålerenga)
20	MF	USA	Henry Wingo (to (Hungary) Ferencváros)
32	MF	NOR	Tobias Hestad (on loan to Raufoss, previously on loan at Stjørdals-Blink)
37	FW	NOR	Ole Sebastian Sundgot (to Ull/Kisa)
50	FW	NOR	Jakob Ørsahl (to Raufoss, previously on loan)

=== Odd ===
In: Note: Flags indicate national team as defined under FIFA eligibility rules; some limited exceptions apply. Players may hold more than one non-FIFA nationality.

No.	Pos.	Nation	Player
6	MF	NOR	Magnus Lekven (from Vålerenga)
10	MF	NOR	Sander Svendsen (on loan from (Denmark) OB)
11	MF	FRO	Gilli Rólantsson (from Brann)
12	GK	SWE	Leopold Wahlstedt (from Arendal)
14	DF	NOR	Conrad Wallem (from Arendal)
18	FW	NOR	Syver Aas (promoted from junior squad)
22	MF	NOR	Kristoffer Larsen (from Åsane)
23	DF	NOR	Solomon Owusu (from Raufoss)
25	DF	NOR	John Kitolano (from (England) Wolverhampton Wanderers, previously on loan)

Out: Note: Flags indicate national team as defined under FIFA eligibility rules; some limited exceptions apply. Players may hold more than one non-FIFA nationality.

No.	Pos.	Nation	Player
3	DF	NOR	Fredrik Semb Berge (retired)
4	DF	DEN	Rasmus Minor Petersen (retired)
6	MF	NOR	Vebjørn Hoff (to Rosenborg)
7	MF	MNE	Vladimir Rodić (loan return to (Sweden) Hammarby)
11	MF	KOS	Elbasan Rashani (to (Turkey) BB Erzurumspor)
12	GK	NOR	Egil Selvik (to Haugesund)
14	MF	NOR	Fredrik Nordkvelle (retired)
17	MF	NOR	Elias Uppheim Skogvoll (on loan to Grorud)
22	FW	SWE	Robin Simović (to (Sweden) Varberg)
23	MF	NOR	Marius Bustgaard Larsen (to (Germany) Holstein Kiel)

=== Rosenborg ===
In: Note: Flags indicate national team as defined under FIFA eligibility rules; some limited exceptions apply. Players may hold more than one non-FIFA nationality.

No.	Pos.	Nation	Player
3	DF	SWE	Jonathan Augustinsson (from (Sweden) Djurgården)
4	MF	NOR	Vebjørn Hoff (from Odd)
10	FW	SWE	Guillermo Molins (from Sarpsborg 08)
22	FW	SWE	Stefano Vecchia (from (Sweden) Sirius)
24	GK	NOR	Sander Tangvik (promoted from junior squad)
25	DF	SWE	Adam Andersson (from (Sweden) Häcken)
26	DF	BIH	Besim Šerbečić (loan return from (Bosnia and Herzegovina) Sarajevo)
27	FW	NOR	Ole Hammerfjell Sæter (from Ranheim)

Out: Note: Flags indicate national team as defined under FIFA eligibility rules; some limited exceptions apply. Players may hold more than one non-FIFA nationality.

No.	Pos.	Nation	Player
2	DF	NOR	Vegar Eggen Hedenstad (to (Turkey) Fatih Karagümrük)
4	DF	NOR	Tore Reginiussen (to (Germany) FC St. Pauli)
10	FW	NOR	Pål André Helland (to Lillestrøm)
13	GK	NOR	Julian Faye Lund (on loan to HamKam)
19	DF	NOR	Gustav Valsvik (to Strømsgodset, previously on loan at Stabæk)
22	MF	NOR	Gjermund Åsen (on loan to Lillestrøm)
23	MF	NOR	Filip Brattbakk (on loan to Ranheim, previously on loan at Raufoss)
25	DF	GUI	Pa Konate (to (Bulgaria) Botev Plovdiv)
26	DF	NOR	Warren Kamanzi (on loan to Ranheim)
28	FW	NGR	Samuel Adegbenro (to (Sweden) Norrköping)
34	FW	NOR	Erik Botheim (to Bodø/Glimt, previously on loan at Stabæk)
39	DF	NOR	Sondre Skogen (to (Netherlands) Jong Feyenoord, previously on loan)
–	MF	SRB	Đorđe Denić (to (Cyprus) Apollon Limassol, previously on loan)
–	DF	NOR	Torbjørn Lysaker Heggem (to Sandnes Ulf, previously on loan at Ranheim)
–	FW	NOR	Andreas Helmersen (to Raufoss)

=== Sandefjord ===
In: Note: Flags indicate national team as defined under FIFA eligibility rules; some limited exceptions apply. Players may hold more than one non-FIFA nationality.

No.	Pos.	Nation	Player
14	FW	NOR	Alexander Ruud Tveter (from Sarpsborg 08)
16	MF	NOR	André Sødlund (from Sandnes Ulf)
19	MF	BIH	Amer Ordagić (from Brann)
20	FW	NOR	Franklin Daddys Boy Nyenetue (from Stjørdals-Blink)
22	DF	NOR	Herman Solberg Nilsen (loan return from Kongsvinger)
24	MF	NOR	Martin Andersen (loan return from Fram)
29	DF	NOR	Jørgen Kili Fjeldskår (promoted from junior squad)
54	GK	NOR	Andreas Albertsen (promoted from junior squad)
92	GK	DEN	Frederik Due (from (United States) Orange County)

Out: Note: Flags indicate national team as defined under FIFA eligibility rules; some limited exceptions apply. Players may hold more than one non-FIFA nationality.

No.	Pos.	Nation	Player
2	DF	NOR	Lars Grorud (retired)
6	MF	ISL	Emil Pálsson (to Sarpsborg 08)
10	FW	ESP	Rufo (to (Denmark) Aalborg)
14	MF	NOR	Stefan Mladenovic (to Arendal)
20	FW	NOR	George Gibson (to Øygarden)
21	DF	SWE	Anton Kralj (to (Sweden) Degerfors)
22	FW	CRC	Deyver Vega (to (Romania) Politehnica Iași)

=== Sarpsborg 08 ===
In: Note: Flags indicate national team as defined under FIFA eligibility rules; some limited exceptions apply. Players may hold more than one non-FIFA nationality.

No.	Pos.	Nation	Player
10	MF	FRA	Rashad Muhammed (from (Turkey) BB Erzurumspor)
13	MF	LBN	Felix Michel Melki (on loan from (Sweden) AIK)
14	MF	ISL	Emil Pálsson (from Sandefjord)
19	MF	SEN	Laurent Mendy (from (Senegal) Oslo FA)
21	GK	NOR	Anders Kristiansen (from (Belgium) Union SG)
22	FW	NOR	Kristian Fardal Opseth (from (India) Bengaluru)
23	MF	BIH	Emir Derviskadic (promoted from junior squad)
25	FW	NOR	Steffen Lie Skålevik (loan return from Start)
28	DF	CIV	Benjamin Karamoko (from Haugesund)
29	FW	MLI	Ibrahima Koné (from Haugesund)
32	DF	NOR	Eirik Wichne (from Start)

Out: Note: Flags indicate national team as defined under FIFA eligibility rules; some limited exceptions apply. Players may hold more than one non-FIFA nationality.

No.	Pos.	Nation	Player
10	FW	SWE	Guillermo Molins (to Rosenborg)
12	GK	CAN	Simon Thomas (to Tromsø)
14	MF	NOR	Tobias Heintz (loan return to (Turkey) Kasımpaşa)
21	MF	BEN	Jordan Adéoti (to (France) Annecy)
24	DF	NOR	Anwar Elyounossi (to (Bulgaria) Botev Plovdiv)
27	FW	MLI	Aboubacar Konté (on loan to Jerv)
28	FW	NOR	Alexander Ruud Tveter (to Sandefjord)
33	GK	MKD	David Mitov Nilsson (to (Sweden) Sirius)
70	MF	EGY	Alexander Jakobsen (to (Egypt) Wadi Degla)
–	DF	CRC	Pablo Arboine (to (Costa Rica) Santos, previously on loan at (Costa Rica) San Carlos)

=== Stabæk ===
In: Note: Flags indicate national team as defined under FIFA eligibility rules; some limited exceptions apply. Players may hold more than one non-FIFA nationality.

No.	Pos.	Nation	Player
4	DF	NOR	Simen Wangberg (from Tromsø)
7	MF	NOR	Jesper Isaksen (loan return from Jerv)
8	MF	KOS	Herolind Shala (from Vålerenga)
9	FW	UKR	Oleksiy Khoblenko (on loan from (Ukraine) Dnipro-1)
10	MF	NOR	Markus Solbakken (from Hamkam)
25	FW	NGR	Uche Great Sabastine (on loan from (Nigeria) Kano Pillars)
32	FW	NOR	Antonio Nusa (promoted from junior squad)
77	FW	NOR	Fitim Azemi (loan return from Tromsø)
80	MF	NOR	Herman Geelmuyden (from (Netherlands) Jong PSV)

Out: Note: Flags indicate national team as defined under FIFA eligibility rules; some limited exceptions apply. Players may hold more than one non-FIFA nationality.

No.	Pos.	Nation	Player
2	DF	NOR	Jørgen Olsen Øveraas (to Sandnes Ulf)
4	DF	NOR	Gustav Valsvik (loan return to Rosenborg)
8	MF	NOR	Emil Bohinen (to (Russia) CSKA Moscow)
9	FW	NED	Darren Maatsen (to (Netherlands) NAC)
10	FW	SWE	Marcus Antonsson (loan return to (Sweden) Malmö)
20	FW	NOR	Erik Botheim (loan return to Rosenborg)
88	FW	NOR	Christopher Cheng (on loan to Strømmen)

=== Strømsgodset ===
In: Note: Flags indicate national team as defined under FIFA eligibility rules; some limited exceptions apply. Players may hold more than one non-FIFA nationality.

No.	Pos.	Nation	Player
9	FW	NGR	Fred Friday (free transfer)
71	DF	NOR	Gustav Valsvik (from Rosenborg)
84	MF	NOR	Ole Enersen (promoted from junior squad)

Out: Note: Flags indicate national team as defined under FIFA eligibility rules; some limited exceptions apply. Players may hold more than one non-FIFA nationality.

No.	Pos.	Nation	Player
9	FW	DEN	Marcus Mølvadgaard (released)
56	FW	NOR	Mustapha Fofana (on loan to Bærum, previously on loan at Øygarden)
63	MF	NOR	Magnus Lankhof Dahlby (released, previously on loan at Grorud)

=== Tromsø ===
In: Note: Flags indicate national team as defined under FIFA eligibility rules; some limited exceptions apply. Players may hold more than one non-FIFA nationality.

No.	Pos.	Nation	Player
6	DF	NOR	Isak Helstad Amundsen (on loan from Bodø/Glimt)
7	MF	DEN	Felix Winther (from (Denmark) Fremad Amager)
12	GK	CAN	Simon Thomas (from Sarpsborg 08)
16	DF	NOR	Tomas Totland (from Sogndal)
18	FW	NGR	Moses Ebiye (from Hamkam)
19	DF	DEN	Niklas Vesterlund (from (Sweden) Trelleborg)
20	DF	NOR	Casper Øyvann (from Tromsdalen)
29	FW	DEN	Joachim Rothmann (on loan from (Denmark) Nordsjælland)
30	MF	NOR	Simen Henriksen (promoted from junior squad)

Out: Note: Flags indicate national team as defined under FIFA eligibility rules; some limited exceptions apply. Players may hold more than one non-FIFA nationality.

No.	Pos.	Nation	Player
6	MF	NOR	Lars Gunnar Johnsen (retired)
12	GK	NOR	Erlend Jacobsen (on loan to (Faroe Islands) B68)
16	FW	NOR	Sigurd Grønli (to Tromsdalen)
18	MF	NOR	Sakarias Opsahl (loan return to Vålerenga)
19	FW	NOR	Mohammed Ahamed (retired)
20	FW	NOR	Brage Berg Pedersen (to Kongsvinger, previously on loan at Øygarden)
22	DF	NOR	Simen Wangberg (to Stabæk)
26	DF	NOR	Steffen Skogvang Pedersen (to Tromsdalen)
29	DF	NOR	Erlend Sivertsen (loan return to Kristiansund)
32	DF	NOR	Runar Johansen (to Senja)
33	MF	NOR	Endre Borch Nash (released)
34	MF	NOR	Tomas Stabell (on loan to Senja, previously on loan at Fløya)
39	DF	NOR	Lars Sætra (to (Sweden) Kalmar)
–	MF	NOR	Gustav Severinsen (released, previously on loan at Florø)

=== Viking ===
In: Note: Flags indicate national team as defined under FIFA eligibility rules; some limited exceptions apply. Players may hold more than one non-FIFA nationality.

No.	Pos.	Nation	Player
2	DF	NOR	Herman Haugen (loan return from Ull/Kisa)
4	DF	NOR	Tord Johnsen Salte (loan return from Sandnes Ulf)
9	FW	SWE	Kevin Kabran (from Start)
20	DF	NED	Shayne Pattynama (from (Netherlands) Telstar)
21	MF	NOR	Harald Nilsen Tangen (loan return from Åsane)
25	DF	NOR	Sebastian Sørlie Henriksen (loan return from Fram)
33	DF	NOR	Vebjørn Hagen (promoted from junior squad)
77	FW	NOR	Zlatko Tripić (from (Turkey) Göztepe)

Out: Note: Flags indicate national team as defined under FIFA eligibility rules; some limited exceptions apply. Players may hold more than one non-FIFA nationality.

No.	Pos.	Nation	Player
5	DF	ISL	Axel Óskar Andrésson (to (Latvia) Riga FC)
7	MF	KOS	Zymer Bytyqi (to (Turkey) Konyaspor)
13	GK	WAL	Michael Crowe (released)
16	FW	NOR	Even Østensen (to Staal)
17	MF	NOR	Sebastian Sebulonsen (on loan to Mjøndalen)
20	FW	KOS	Ylldren Ibrahimaj (to (Russia) Ural Yekaterinburg)
26	FW	NOR	Jefferson de Souza (to Egersund)

=== Vålerenga ===
In: Note: Flags indicate national team as defined under FIFA eligibility rules; some limited exceptions apply. Players may hold more than one non-FIFA nationality.

No.	Pos.	Nation	Player
6	MF	NOR	Sakarias Opsahl (loan return from Tromsø)
11	FW	TUN	Amor Layouni (from (Egypt) Pyramids)
14	FW	NOR	Henrik Udahl (from Åsane)
16	MF	NOR	Mathias Emilsen (promoted from junior squad)
17	MF	NOR	Tobias Christensen (from Molde)
18	MF	NOR	Fredrik Holmé (loan return from Ull/Kisa)
19	FW	NOR	Seedy Jatta (promoted from junior squad)
20	MF	NOR	Magnus Bech Riisnæs (promoted from junior squad)

Out: Note: Flags indicate national team as defined under FIFA eligibility rules; some limited exceptions apply. Players may hold more than one non-FIFA nationality.

No.	Pos.	Nation	Player
3	DF	NOR	Johan Lædre Bjørdal (retired)
5	DF	URU	Felipe Carvalho (to (Bolivia) Bolívar)
6	MF	KOS	Herolind Shala (to Stabæk)
8	MF	NOR	Magnus Lekven (to Odd)
10	FW	ISL	Matthías Vilhjálmsson (to (Iceland) FH Hafnarfjordur)
11	FW	NOR	Bård Finne (to (Denmark) SønderjyskE)
17	MF	GUI	Ousmane Camara (on loan to (Georgia (country)) Dila Gori)
20	FW	NOR	Benjamin Stokke (to Mjøndalen)
–	MF	GHA	Mohammed Abu (released, previously on loan at (United States) D.C. United)
—	MF	NOR	Brede Sandmoen (released, previously on loan at Strømmen)

== 1. divisjon ==
=== Aalesund ===
In: Note: Flags indicate national team as defined under FIFA eligibility rules; some limited exceptions apply. Players may hold more than one non-FIFA nationality.

No.	Pos.	Nation	Player
3	DF	NED	Quint Jansen (from Mjøndalen)
5	DF	SWE	David Fällman (from (Sweden) Hammarby)
6	MF	NOR	Erlend Segberg (from Start)
13	GK	USA	Michael Lansing (from (Denmark) Horsens)
14	MF	NOR	Torbjørn Kallevåg (from Lillestrøm)
15	FW	NOR	Kristoffer Ødemarksbakken (on loan from Lillestrøm)
20	MF	NOR	Oscar Solnørdal (from Rosenborg 2)
33	DF	NOR	Simen Rafn (from Lillestrøm)
34	DF	NOR	Stian Aarønes Holte (promoted from junior squad)
37	MF	NOR	Henrik Melland (promoted from junior squad)
38	DF	NOR	Nikolai Hopland (promoted from junior squad)

Out: Note: Flags indicate national team as defined under FIFA eligibility rules; some limited exceptions apply. Players may hold more than one non-FIFA nationality.

No.	Pos.	Nation	Player
5	DF	NOR	Oddbjørn Lie (retired)
6	DF	NED	Daan Klinkenberg (to (Sweden) Mjällby)
15	DF	NOR	Ståle Sæthre (to Sandnes Ulf)
19	MF	NOR	Peter Orry Larsen (retired)
20	DF	BDI	Parfait Bizoza (to (Russia) Ufa)
21	MF	NOR	Markus Karlsbakk (on loan to Raufoss)
21	DF	DEN	Kasper Jørgensen (loan return to (Denmark) Lyngby)
25	GK	NOR	Gudmund Kongshavn (to (Romania) Dinamo București)
27	DF	NOR	Sigurd Tafjord (released)
28	DF	NOR	Håvard Mork Breivik (on loan to Brattvåg, previously on loan at Hødd)
30	MF	NGR	Izunna Uzochukwu (released)
36	FW	NOR	Vetle Fiskerstrand (to Florø)
39	DF	CIV	Benjamin Karamoko (loan return to Haugesund)
–	MF	NOR	Sondre Brunstad Fet (to Bodø/Glimt, previously on loan)

=== Bryne ===
In: Note: Flags indicate national team as defined under FIFA eligibility rules; some limited exceptions apply. Players may hold more than one non-FIFA nationality.

No.	Pos.	Nation	Player
8	MF	NOR	Sixten Dalen Jensen (from Sogndal)
19	DF	NOR	Tobias Guddal (from Djerv 1919)
23	FW	FRO	Meinhard Olsen (from (Sweden) GAIS)

Out: Note: Flags indicate national team as defined under FIFA eligibility rules; some limited exceptions apply. Players may hold more than one non-FIFA nationality.

No.	Pos.	Nation	Player
8	MF	AUS	Luc Jeggo (to (Australia) Green Gully)
19	DF	NOR	Marius Sandvik (loan return to Nardo)
21	DF	NOR	Krister Wemberg (retired)

=== Fredrikstad ===
In: Note: Flags indicate national team as defined under FIFA eligibility rules; some limited exceptions apply. Players may hold more than one non-FIFA nationality.

No.	Pos.	Nation	Player
2	DF	NOR	Alexander Betten Hansen (from Mjøndalen)
3	DF	NOR	Ethan Amundsen-Day (promoted from junior squad)
12	FW	NGR	Taofeek Ismaheel (from Skeid)
19	MF	NOR	Olav Øby (from KFUM)

Out: Note: Flags indicate national team as defined under FIFA eligibility rules; some limited exceptions apply. Players may hold more than one non-FIFA nationality.

No.	Pos.	Nation	Player
3	DF	NOR	Josef Baccay (loan return to Lillestrøm)
19	MF	NOR	Hasan Duman (released)
23	MF	NOR	Marius Hagen (released)
24	MF	NOR	Phillipe Koko (to Egersund, previously on loan at Levanger)
27	FW	NOR	Eirik Lorås Vestby (to Kvik Halden)

=== Grorud ===
In: Note: Flags indicate national team as defined under FIFA eligibility rules; some limited exceptions apply. Players may hold more than one non-FIFA nationality.

No.	Pos.	Nation	Player
2	DF	NOR	Ridouan Essaeh (from Kongsvinger)
3	DF	NOR	Tobias Collett (from Arendal)
13	MF	NOR	Hassan Yusuf (from Skeid)
18	MF	NOR	Elias Uppheim Skogvoll (on loan from Odd)
20	DF	NOR	Saadiq Elmi (loan return from Moss)
29	FW	NOR	Bjørn Martin Kristensen (from Nordstrand)
45	GK	NOR	Vegard Storsve (promoted from junior squad)

Out: Note: Flags indicate national team as defined under FIFA eligibility rules; some limited exceptions apply. Players may hold more than one non-FIFA nationality.

No.	Pos.	Nation	Player
1	GK	NOR	Emil Ødegaard (loan return to Lillestrøm)
2	DF	NOR	Kamran Ali Iqbal (released)
3	DF	NOR	Trace Akino Murray (to Kongsvinger)
17	MF	NOR	Petter Mathias Olsen (released)
24	DF	NOR	Kristian Novak (to Jerv)
32	DF	NOR	Leo Cornic (to (Sweden) Djurgården)
99	MF	NOR	Magnus Lankhof Dahlby (loan return to Strømsgodset)

=== HamKam ===
In: Note: Flags indicate national team as defined under FIFA eligibility rules; some limited exceptions apply. Players may hold more than one non-FIFA nationality.

No.	Pos.	Nation	Player
11	MF	NOR	Morten Bjørlo (from Strømmen)
12	GK	POL	Lukasz Jarosinski (from (Faroe Islands) KI Klaksvik)
14	MF	NOR	Halvor Rødølen Opsahl (from Lillehammer)
15	MF	NOR	Thorbjørn Kristiansen (promoted from junior squad)
17	FW	NGR	Jibril Antala Abubakar (from (Denmark) Midtjylland U23)
18	MF	NOR	Niklas Rekdal (from Brattvåg)
19	MF	NOR	Van Za Lian Bawi Hrin (promoted from junior squad)
21	MF	NOR	Benjamin Thoresen Faraas (from Flisa)
22	DF	SWE	Rasmus Lindkvist (from (Sweden) AIK)
25	DF	NOR	Davod Arzani (loan return from Brumunddal)
31	GK	NOR	Julian Faye Lund (on loan from Rosenborg)
33	DF	NOR	Aleksander Melgalvis (from Lillestrøm)
53	FW	SWE	Albert Berisha (from Trysil)
58	DF	TUR	Hasan Kurucay (from Strømmen)

Out: Note: Flags indicate national team as defined under FIFA eligibility rules; some limited exceptions apply. Players may hold more than one non-FIFA nationality.

No.	Pos.	Nation	Player
2	DF	NOR	Patrick Alfei Sæbø (released, previously on loan at Kvik Halden)
3	FW	NOR	William Moan Mikalsen (to Strømmen)
4	MF	NOR	Erik Olaf Krohnstad (on loan to Øygarden)
6	DF	NOR	Amin Nouri (loan return to Vålerenga)
7	MF	DEN	Ahmed Daghim (loan return to (Denmark) F.C. Copenhagen)
8	MF	NOR	Markus Solbakken (to Stabæk)
8	MF	NOR	Sander Eng Strand (to Bærum)
11	FW	NOR	Marcus Pedersen (to (Turkey) Ankaraspor)
16	MF	NOR	Anders Bakken Dieserud (retired)
17	DF	NOR	Kristian Strande (to Arendal)
18	FW	NOR	Sebastian Pedersen (to Moss)
21	DF	NOR	Jesper Taaje (to KFUM)
23	FW	NOR	Jarmund Øyen Kvernstuen (on loan to Bærum)
30	GK	NOR	Andreas Hippe Fagereng (to Eidsvold Turn, previously on loan at Elverum)
31	GK	SEN	Serigne Mor Mbaye (loan return to Kristiansund)
40	FW	NGR	Moses Ebiye (to Tromsø)
99	FW	NGR	Adeleke Akinyemi (loan return to Start)

=== Jerv ===
In: Note: Flags indicate national team as defined under FIFA eligibility rules; some limited exceptions apply. Players may hold more than one non-FIFA nationality.

No.	Pos.	Nation	Player
4	DF	NOR	Kristian Novak (from Grorud)
5	DF	NOR	Erik Tobias Sandberg (on loan from Lillestrøm)
7	MF	CPV	Willis Furtado (from (Egypt) ZED)
17	DF	NOR	Nicholas Marthinussen (from Brann)
26	MF	NOR	Mohammed Badran Abdalhalim (promoted from junior squad)
27	FW	MLI	Aboubacar Konté (on loan from Sarpsborg 08)
30	GK	NOR	Andreas Olsvoll (from Fløy)
66	MF	GHA	Michael Baidoo (from (Denmark) Midtjylland, previously on loan)

Out: Note: Flags indicate national team as defined under FIFA eligibility rules; some limited exceptions apply. Players may hold more than one non-FIFA nationality.

No.	Pos.	Nation	Player
1	GK	NOR	Benjamin Boujar (to Vindbjart)
4	DF	NOR	Espen Ramse Knudsen (released)
7	DF	NOR	Simon Larsen (retired)
11	MF	NOR	Daniel Aase (retired)
16	MF	NOR	Tobias Wangerud (to Express)
17	DF	NOR	Nicholas Marthinussen (to Øygarden)
22	MF	NOR	Jesper Isaksen (loan return to Stabæk)
31	MF	NOR	Daniel Roppestad (to Arendal)
66	MF	GHA	Michael Baidoo (to Sandnes Ulf)

=== KFUM ===
In: Note: Flags indicate national team as defined under FIFA eligibility rules; some limited exceptions apply. Players may hold more than one non-FIFA nationality.

No.	Pos.	Nation	Player
5	DF	NOR	Aaron Kiil Olsen (from Bærum)
9	FW	NOR	Abdul-Basit Agouda (loan return from Øygarden)
13	GK	NOR	Jonathan Ådlandsvik (promoted from junior squad)
19	FW	NOR	Philip Eng Romsaas (from Nordstrand)
23	MF	NOR	Kristian Solberg Aarstad (promoted from junior squad)
25	DF	NOR	Jesper Taaje (from Hamkam)
30	DF	NOR	Aksel Baran Potur (promoted from junior squad)
32	FW	NOR	Vegard Holsæther (promoted from junior squad)

Out: Note: Flags indicate national team as defined under FIFA eligibility rules; some limited exceptions apply. Players may hold more than one non-FIFA nationality.

No.	Pos.	Nation	Player
5	MF	NOR	Haakon Aalmen (retired)
9	FW	NOR	Abdul-Basit Agouda (released, previously on loan at Øygarden)
15	DF	NOR	Mansour Gueye (to Sogndal)
16	FW	NOR	Fisnik Kastrati (to Asker)
19	FW	NOR	Yannis Moula (to Nardo)
22	MF	NOR	Olav Øby (to Fredrikstad)
23	DF	NOR	Marius Brevig (retired)
25	DF	NOR	Tobias Collett (to Arendal)
28	DF	FRA	Emmanuel Troudart (to Moss)
30	FW	NOR	Lasse Sigurdsen (to Fløy)

=== Ranheim ===
In: Note: Flags indicate national team as defined under FIFA eligibility rules; some limited exceptions apply. Players may hold more than one non-FIFA nationality.

No.	Pos.	Nation	Player
11	FW	NOR	Marcus Mehnert (from Brann)
12	DF	NOR	Warren Kamanzi (on loan from Rosenborg)
14	MF	SWE	Simon Marklund (from Kongsvinger)
18	MF	NOR	Filip Brattbakk (on loan from Rosenborg)
20	FW	NOR	Elias Hoff Melkersen (on loan from Bodø/Glimt)
24	DF	NOR	Jarl Magnus Knutsen (from Nardo)
33	GK	SWE	Jonatan Johansson (from Stjørdals-Blink)
35	GK	NOR	Erland Tangvik (from (Sweden) Djurgården)
92	GK	TTO	Nicklas Frenderup (from Stjørdals-Blink)
–	FW	NOR	Magnus Høiseth (loan return from Nardo)

Out: Note: Flags indicate national team as defined under FIFA eligibility rules; some limited exceptions apply. Players may hold more than one non-FIFA nationality.

No.	Pos.	Nation	Player
1	GK	NOR	Even Barli (retired)
8	MF	NOR	Magnus Stamnestrø (retired)
11	MF	NOR	Eirik Valla Dønnem (retired)
14	DF	NOR	Torbjørn Lysaker Heggem (loan return to Rosenborg)
16	DF	NOR	Robert Behson-Courage Williams (on loan to Ull/Kisa)
17	MF	NOR	Sondre Sørløkk (to Ull/Kisa)
18	FW	NOR	Ivar Sollie Rønning (to (Faroe Islands) KÍ Klaksvík)
20	FW	NOR	Ole Hammerfjell Sæter (to Rosenborg)
26	DF	NOR	Sondre Klingen Langås (on loan to Stjørdals-Blink)

=== Raufoss ===
In: Note: Flags indicate national team as defined under FIFA eligibility rules; some limited exceptions apply. Players may hold more than one non-FIFA nationality.

No.	Pos.	Nation	Player
4	DF	NOR	Sivert Westerlund (from Asker)
6	MF	DEN	Mikkel Frankoch (from (Faroe Islands) HB Thorshavn)
8	MF	DEN	Mathias Nygaard (from (Faroe Islands) HB Thorshavn)
9	FW	NOR	Andreas Helmersen (from Rosenborg)
10	MF	NOR	Teodor Berg Haltvik (from Rosenborg 2)
14	FW	NOR	Sander Werni (from Vålerenga 2)
15	MF	NOR	Markus Aanesland (from Kongsvinger)
16	FW	NOR	Jakob Ørsahl (from Molde, previously on loan)
17	FW	NOR	Håvar Solbakken Befring (promoted from junior squad)
18	MF	NOR	Even Bydal (from Kongsvinger)
21	DF	NOR	Herman Kleppa (from Egersund)
22	MF	NOR	Markus Karlsbakk (on loan from Aalesund)
24	FW	FIN	Enoch Banza (from (Finland) HJK)
29	MF	NOR	Tobias Hestad (on loan from Molde)

Out: Note: Flags indicate national team as defined under FIFA eligibility rules; some limited exceptions apply. Players may hold more than one non-FIFA nationality.

No.	Pos.	Nation	Player
4	DF	NOR	Stian Simenstad (retired)
6	DF	NOR	Snorre Strand Nilsen (to Kristiansund)
8	MF	NCA	Matias Belli Moldskred (to Start)
9	FW	DEN	Lee Rochester Sørensen (released)
10	DF	NOR	Ryan Doghman (to Åsane)
14	FW	NOR	Oskar Løken (to Hødd)
15	MF	NOR	Martin Heiberg (to (Faroe Islands) 07 Vestur)
17	DF	NOR	Solomon Owusu (to Odd)
21	MF	NOR	Lasse Berg Johnsen (to (Denmark) Randers)
22	MF	NOR	Kristoffer Nessø (to Sogndal)
24	MF	NOR	Filip Brattbakk (loan return to Rosenborg)
27	MF	NOR	Emil Breivik (loan return to Molde)
32	FW	NOR	Håkon Bjørdal Leine (to Hødd)
—	DF	NOR	Henrik Fløgum (to Fløya, previously on loan at Gjøvik-Lyn)

=== Sandnes Ulf ===
In: Note: Flags indicate national team as defined under FIFA eligibility rules; some limited exceptions apply. Players may hold more than one non-FIFA nationality.

No.	Pos.	Nation	Player
4	DF	NOR	Kevin Jablinski (loan return from Øygarden)
7	FW	NOR	Mathias Bringaker (from Start)
10	MF	GHA	Michael Baidoo (from Jerv)
11	FW	NOR	Erlend Hustad (on loan from Brann)
14	DF	NOR	Torbjørn Lysaker Heggem (from Rosenborg)
15	DF	NOR	Ståle Sæthre (from Aalesund)
21	DF	NOR	Fredrik Mani Pålerud (from Kongsvinger)
22	MF	NOR	Horenus Tadesse (on loan from Kristiansund)
23	DF	NOR	Jørgen Olsen Øveraas (from Stabæk)

Out: Note: Flags indicate national team as defined under FIFA eligibility rules; some limited exceptions apply. Players may hold more than one non-FIFA nationality.

No.	Pos.	Nation	Player
1	GK	NOR	Pål Vestly Heigre (released)
5	DF	NOR	Christer Reppesgård Hansen (to Arendal)
7	MF	NOR	Mads Berg Sande (loan return to Haugesund)
8	FW	NOR	Magnus Grødem (to Molde)
11	FW	SWE	Alexander Johansson (loan return to (Sweden) Varberg)
20	MF	NOR	Adrian Berntsen (to Notodden)
21	MF	NOR	André Sødlund (to Sandefjord)
22	DF	BIH	Jasmin Bogdanovic (to Vard)
23	DF	NOR	Tord Johnsen Salte (loan return to Viking)
30	FW	NOR	Kent Håvard Eriksen (to Lillestrøm)
32	DF	DEN	Claes Kronberg (to (Faroe Islands) KÍ Klaksvík)

=== Sogndal ===
In: Note: Flags indicate national team as defined under FIFA eligibility rules; some limited exceptions apply. Players may hold more than one non-FIFA nationality.

No.	Pos.	Nation	Player
2	DF	NOR	Per-Egil Flo (from (Switzerland) Lausanne-Sport)
3	DF	NOR	Mansour Gueye (from KFUM)
8	MF	NOR	Kristoffer Valsvik (from Åsane)
13	GK	NOR	Jørgen Johnsen (from Vålerenga 2, previously on loan)
15	MF	NOR	Kristoffer Nessø (from Raufoss)
19	DF	NOR	Tobias Bjørnebye (loan return from Hødd)
20	MF	NOR	Noah Solskjær (on loan from Kristiansund)
28	FW	NOR	Mathias Sundberg (loan return from Tromsdalen)
31	GK	SEN	Serigne Mor Mbaye (on loan from Kristiansund)
34	DF	NOR	Iver Skorve (promoted from junior squad)

Out: Note: Flags indicate national team as defined under FIFA eligibility rules; some limited exceptions apply. Players may hold more than one non-FIFA nationality.

No.	Pos.	Nation	Player
2	DF	NOR	Tomas Totland (to Tromsø)
3	DF	NOR	Andreas van der Spa (on loan to Arendal)
8	MF	NOR	Tomas Kristoffersen (to Åsane)
20	FW	NOR	Markus Brændsrød (to Eik Tønsberg)
22	DF	NOR	Eivind Helgesen (on loan to Øygarden)
24	MF	NOR	Sixten Dalen Jensen (to Bryne)
25	MF	SEN	Alioune Ndour (to Haugesund)
30	DF	NGR	Igoh Ogbu (to Lillestrøm)
37	GK	NOR	Håvard Hetle (on loan to Florø)

=== Start ===
In: Note: Flags indicate national team as defined under FIFA eligibility rules; some limited exceptions apply. Players may hold more than one non-FIFA nationality.

No.	Pos.	Nation	Player
5	DF	NOR	Peter Reinhardsen (from Arendal)
7	MF	NCA	Matias Belli Moldskred (from Raufoss)
17	FW	NGR	Adeleke Akinyemi (loan return from HamKam)
19	FW	NOR	Emil Grønn Pedersen (from Vindbjart)
23	FW	DEN	Sebastian Buch Jensen (on loan from (Denmark) Midtjylland)
26	GK	NOR	Jasper Silva Torkildsen (from Vigør)
30	FW	NOR	Jakob Ugland (promoted from junior squad)
31	DF	NOR	Altin Ujkani (loan return from Fløy)
58	MF	NOR	Preben Hille (promoted from junior squad)

Out: Note: Flags indicate national team as defined under FIFA eligibility rules; some limited exceptions apply. Players may hold more than one non-FIFA nationality.

No.	Pos.	Nation	Player
7	FW	SWE	Kevin Kabran (to Viking)
10	FW	NOR	Steffen Lie Skålevik (loan return to Sarpsborg 08)
14	MF	NOR	Espen Børufsen (retired)
19	MF	NOR	Kasper Skaanes (to Brann)
20	FW	NOR	Mathias Bringaker (to Sandnes Ulf)
23	MF	NOR	Erlend Segberg (to Aalesund)
24	MF	ISL	Guðmundur Andri Tryggvason (to (Iceland) Valur)
27	DF	NOR	Eirik Wichne (to Sarpsborg 08)
30	FW	CRC	Christian Bolaños (to (Costa Rica) Saprissa)
50	GK	NOR	Fredrik Repstad Hansen (released)
55	FW	NOR	Kristian Strømland Lien (to Flekkerøy, previously on loan)

=== Stjørdals-Blink ===
In: Note: Flags indicate national team as defined under FIFA eligibility rules; some limited exceptions apply. Players may hold more than one non-FIFA nationality.

No.	Pos.	Nation	Player
1	GK	NOR	Emil Ødegaard (on loan from Lillestrøm)
12	GK	NOR	Rasmus Sandberg (from Rosenborg 2)
18	DF	NOR	Håvard Kleven Lorentsen (from Levanger, previously on loan)
19	FW	NOR	Runar Hauge (on loan from Bodø/Glimt)
21	DF	NOR	Kjetil Holand Tøsse (from Kristiansund)
24	DF	NOR	Aleksander Foosnæs (from Bodø/Glimt)
26	DF	NOR	Sondre Klingen Langås (on loan from Ranheim)
27	FW	NOR	Johann Hoseth Kosberg (from Ranheim 2)

Out: Note: Flags indicate national team as defined under FIFA eligibility rules; some limited exceptions apply. Players may hold more than one non-FIFA nationality.

No.	Pos.	Nation	Player
1	GK	TTO	Nicklas Frenderup (to Ranheim)
8	MF	NOR	Sander Kartum (to Kristiansund)
12	GK	NOR	Isak Lein Valberg (released)
16	FW	NOR	Franklin Daddys Boy Nyenetue (to Sandefjord)
19	MF	NOR	Tobias Hestad (loan return to Molde)
20	MF	NOR	Simen Raaen Sandmæl (retired)
21	GK	SWE	Jonatan Johansson (to Ranheim)
22	MF	NOR	Patrik Dønheim Hjelmseth (on loan to Nardo)
26	MF	NOR	Adan Abadala Hussein (loan return to Bodø/Glimt)
26	DF	NOR	Sondre Klingen Langås (loan return to Ranheim)

=== Strømmen ===
In: Note: Flags indicate national team as defined under FIFA eligibility rules; some limited exceptions apply. Players may hold more than one non-FIFA nationality.

No.	Pos.	Nation	Player
7	FW	NOR	William Moan Mikalsen (from HamKam)
11	FW	DEN	Lorent Callaku (from Florø)
14	FW	NOR	Walid Idrissi (from Kjelsås)
16	FW	NOR	Christopher Cheng (on loan from Stabæk)
26	DF	NOR	Simen Olafsen (from Levanger)
27	FW	GAM	Jibril Bojang (from (Egypt) ZED)

Out: Note: Flags indicate national team as defined under FIFA eligibility rules; some limited exceptions apply. Players may hold more than one non-FIFA nationality.

No.	Pos.	Nation	Player
11	MF	NOR	Morten Bjørlo (to HamKam)
14	FW	NOR	Håvard Segtnan Thun (released)
16	MF	NOR	Brede Sandmoen (loan return to Vålerenga)
18	FW	NOR	Lasse Selvåg Nordås (to Bodø/Glimt)
19	FW	NOR	Kjell Rune Sellin (retired)
58	DF	TUR	Hasan Kurucay (to HamKam)

=== Ull/Kisa ===
In: Note: Flags indicate national team as defined under FIFA eligibility rules; some limited exceptions apply. Players may hold more than one non-FIFA nationality.

No.	Pos.	Nation	Player
3	DF	NOR	Robert Behson-Courage Williams (on loan from Ranheim)
6	FW	NOR	Ole Sebastian Sundgot (from Molde)
7	MF	NOR	Sondre Sørløkk (from Ranheim)
14	MF	NOR	Henning Tønsberg Andersen (from Skeid)
15	FW	NOR	Mikkel Rakneberg (from Lillestrøm 2)
22	MF	NOR	William Lunde (from Sarpsborg 08 2)
24	DF	NOR	Jens Husebø (from Hødd)
27	MF	NOR	Petter Hokstad (promoted from junior squad)
28	MF	NOR	Magnus Nordengen Knudsen (on loan from Lillestrøm)
–	DF	NOR	Thor Kristian Økland (from Øygarden)

Out: Note: Flags indicate national team as defined under FIFA eligibility rules; some limited exceptions apply. Players may hold more than one non-FIFA nationality.

No.	Pos.	Nation	Player
1	GK	NOR	Alexander Håkull-Vangen (retired)
3	DF	NOR	Vegard Kongsro (to Bodø/Glimt)
5	DF	NOR	Nikolas Walstad (to Mjøndalen)
6	MF	NOR	Erik Ansok Frøysa (loan return to Bærum)
8	MF	NOR	Sverre Økland (to Hødd)
14	FW	NOR	Ole Andreas Nesset (to Eidsvold Turn)
15	FW	NOR	Sander Werni (loan return to Vålerenga 2)
17	MF	NOR	Martin Søreide (to (Iceland) Haukar, previously on loan at Kvik Halden)
22	FW	NOR	Sander Jonassen Forø (to (Iceland) Haukar)
26	DF	NOR	Fredrik Holmé (loan return to Vålerenga)
29	DF	NOR	Herman Haugen (loan return to Viking)
32	FW	NOR	Kristoffer Ødemarksbakken (loan return to Lillestrøm)
—	DF	NOR	Thor Kristian Økland (retired)

=== Åsane ===
In: Note: Flags indicate national team as defined under FIFA eligibility rules; some limited exceptions apply. Players may hold more than one non-FIFA nationality.

No.	Pos.	Nation	Player
6	MF	NOR	Bjarte Haugsdal (from Øygarden)
7	FW	NOR	Kristoffer Stava (loan return from Øygarden)
8	MF	NOR	Tomas Kristoffersen (from Sogndal)
15	DF	NOR	Emil Kalsaas (from Brann, previously on loan)
17	DF	NOR	Ryan Doghman (from Raufoss)
18	FW	NOR	Ole Kallevåg (loan return from Sotra)
23	DF	NOR	Erlend Hellevik Larsen (from Øygarden)
50	MF	NOR	Henrik Gjerde Ødemark (from Brann 2)
88	FW	NOR	Geir André Herrem (from (Sweden) Kalmar)

Out: Note: Flags indicate national team as defined under FIFA eligibility rules; some limited exceptions apply. Players may hold more than one non-FIFA nationality.

No.	Pos.	Nation	Player
8	MF	NOR	Kristoffer Valsvik (to Sogndal)
9	FW	NOR	Henrik Udahl (to Vålerenga)
14	MF	NOR	Jonas Tillung Fredriksen (on loan to Øygarden)
24	DF	NOR	Sigurd Kvile (to Bodø/Glimt)
25	DF	NOR	Kristoffer Bidne (to Voss, previously on loan at Øygarden)
29	MF	NOR	Harald Nilsen Tangen (loan return to Viking)
30	DF	NOR	Elias Rognstad Brox (demoted to B team, previously on loan at Sotra)
91	MF	NOR	Kristoffer Larsen (to Odd)
–	DF	NOR	Magnus Nybakken Bruun-Hanssen (to Hødd, previously on loan at Sotra)
