= 2020 Aalesunds FK season =

Aalesund
2020 season
- Chairman: Jan Petter Hagen
- Manager: Lars Bohinen
- Stadium: Color Line Stadion
- Eliteserien: 16th
- NM Cupen: Canceled due to the COVID-19 pandemic
- Top goalscorer: League: Hólmbert Friðjónsson (11); All: Hólmbert Friðjónsson (11)
Home colours	Away colours

The 2020 season was Aalesund's first season back in Eliteserien since their relegation at the end of the 2017 season. They finished the season bottom of the league and where relegated back to the 1. divisjon at the first opportunity.

== Season events ==
On 12 June, the Norwegian Football Federation announced that a maximum of 200 home fans would be allowed to attend the upcoming seasons matches.

On 10 September, the Norwegian Football Federation cancelled the 2020 Norwegian Cup due to the COVID-19 pandemic in Norway.

On 30 September, the Minister of Culture and Gender Equality, Abid Raja, announced that clubs would be able to have crowds of 600 at games from 12 October.

== Squad ==
As of 15 October 2020

Note: Flags indicate national team as defined under FIFA eligibility rules; some limited exceptions apply. Players may hold more than one non-FIFA nationality.

No.	Pos.	Nation	Player
1	GK	NOR	Andreas Lie
2	DF	NED	Shaquill Sno
4	DF	NOR	Jonas Grønner
5	DF	NOR	Oddbjørn Lie
6	DF	NED	Daan Klinkenberg
7	MF	CPV	Erikson Spinola Lima
8	MF	NOR	Fredrik Carlsen
9	FW	CHI	Niklas Castro
11	MF	NOR	Simen Bolkan Nordli
15	DF	NOR	Ståle Steen Sæthre
16	DF	NOR	Jørgen Hatlehol
17	FW	SEN	Mamadou Diaw
18	DF	ISL	Davíð Kristján Ólafsson
19	MF	NOR	Peter Orry Larsen

No.	Pos.	Nation	Player
20	DF	BDI	Parfait Bizoza
21	DF	DEN	Kasper Jørgensen (on loan from Lyngby)
22	FW	NOR	Sigurd Hauso Haugen
23	FW	NOR	Torbjørn Agdestein
24	GK	NOR	Enock Mawete Mwimba
25	GK	NOR	Gudmund Broks Kongshavn
27	DF	NOR	Sigurd Tafjord
30	MF	NGA	Izunna Uzochukwu
32	MF	NOR	Kristoffer Ødven
36	FW	NOR	Vetle Fiskerstrand
38	FW	NOR	Isak Dybvik Määttä
39	DF	CIV	Benjamin Karamoko (on loan from Haugesund)
41	MF	NOR	Markus Karlsbakk

=== Out on loan ===
Note: Flags indicate national team as defined under FIFA eligibility rules; some limited exceptions apply. Players may hold more than one non-FIFA nationality.

No. / Pos. / Nation / Player; 17 / MF / NOR / Sondre Brunstad Fet (at Bodø/Glimt until 31 December 2020)	No. / Pos. / Nation / Player; 28 / DF / NOR / Håvard Mork Breivik (at Hødd until 31 December 2020)

== Transfers ==
=== In ===
Date	Position	Nationality	Name	From	Fee	Ref.
1 January 2020	DF	(Netherlands)	Daan Klinkenberg	Inter Turku	Undisclosed	
2 January 2020	MF	(Norway)	Simen Nordli	HamKam	Undisclosed	
29 January 2020	GK	(Norway)	Gudmund Kongshavn	Tromsø	Undisclosed	
14 February 2020	DF	(Netherlands)	Shaquill Sno	Telstar	Undisclosed	
24 February 2020	MF	(England)	Jordon Mutch	Gyeongnam	Free	
2 March 2020	DF	(Burundi)	Parfait Bizoza	Raufoss	Undisclosed	
29 May 2020	FW	(Norway)	Sigurd Haugen	Union SG	Undisclosed	
15 October 2020	FW	(Senegal)	Mamadou Diaw		Free	

=== Loans in ===
Start date	Position	Nationality	Name	From	End date	Ref.
7 September 2020	DF	(Ivory Coast)	Benjamin Karamoko	Haugesund	End of season	
5 October 2020	DF	(Denmark)	Kasper Jørgensen	Lyngby	End of season	

=== Out ===
Date	Position	Nationality	Name	To	Fee	Ref.
14 January 2020	DF	(Norway)	Kristoffer Hay	Bryne	Undisclosed	
28 January 2020	DF	(Norway)	Tega George	Strømmen	Undisclosed	
31 January 2020	FW	(Senegal)	Pape Habib Guèye	K.V. Kortrijk	Undisclosed	
8 March 2020	GK	(Norway)	Marius Berntzen	Øygarden	Undisclosed	
5 October 2020	DF	(Iceland)	Daníel Leó Grétarsson	Blackpool	Undisclosed	
5 October 2020	FW	(Iceland)	Hólmbert Friðjónsson	Brescia	Undisclosed	

=== Loans out ===
Date	Position	Nationality	Name	From	Date to	Ref.
15 January 2020	MF	(Norway)	Markus Karlsbakk	Hødd	5 June 2020	
29 May 2020	MF	(Norway)	Sondre Fet	Bodø/Glimt	End of season	
5 October 2020	DF	(Norway)	Håvard Mork Breivik	Hødd	End of season	

=== Released ===
Date	Position	Nationality	Name	Joined	Date
14 November 2019	GK	(Norway)	Tarjei Omenås	Retired	
14 November 2019	DF	(Netherlands)	Kaj Ramsteijn	Kozakken Boys	
14 November 2019	DF	(Netherlands)	Kenny van der Weg	TOP Oss	30 January 2020
14 November 2019	DF	(Norway)	Robert Sandnes	Retired	
14 November 2019	MF	(Iceland)	Aron Elís Þrándarson	OB	23 December 2019
22 September 2020	MF	(England)	Jordon Mutch		

== Friendlies ==
6 June 2019	Sogndal	1–0	Aalesund	Sogndalsfjøra
12:00 CEST (UTC+2)		Report		Stadium: Fosshaugane Campus

== Competitions ==
=== Eliteserien ===
==== Results summary ====
Overall								Home						Away					
Pld	W	D	L	GF	GA	GD	Pts	W	D	L	GF	GA	GD	W	D	L	GF	GA	GD
30	2	5	23	30	85	−55	11	1	3	11	16	39	−23	1	2	12	14	46	−32

Last updated: 22 December 2020.
Source: Results

==== Results by round ====
Round	1	2	3	4	5	6	7	8	9	10	11	12	13	14	15	16	17	18	19	20	21	22	23	24	25	26	27	28	29	30
Ground	H	A	H	A	H	A	H	A	H	A	H	A	H	A	H	A	H	A	H	H	A	H	A	A	H	A	H	A	H	A
Result	L	L	D	D	L	D	L	L	L	L	W	L	D	L	L	L	L	L	L	L	L	L	W	L	D	L	L	L	L	L
Position	16	16	15	14	15	16	16	16	16	16	16	16	16	16	16	16	16	16	16	16	16	16	16	16	16	16	16	16	16	16

Updated to match(es) played on 22 December 2020. Source: Results
A = Away; H = Home; W = Win; D = Draw; L = Loss

==== Results ====
16 June 2020 1	Aalesund	1–4	Molde	Ålesund
18:00 CEST (UTC+2)	Castro (penalty missed) 25'; Nordli 29'	Report	Eikrem 10'; James (yellow card) 24' (yellow-red card) 70' (goal) 54'; Hussain 45+1'; Hestad 86'; Wingo (yellow card) 90+3'	Stadium: Color Line Stadion; Attendance: 200; Referee: Tommy Skjerven

21 June 2020 2	Kristiansund	7–2	Aalesund	Kristiansund
18:00 CEST (UTC+2)	Kastrati (yellow card) 16'; Pellegrino 24', 35', 65'; Kalludra 31'; Askar 63'; Sørli 68'; Bye 81'	Report	Ólafsson (yellow card) 2'; P.Ulvestad 11' (o.g.); O.Lie (yellow card) 16'; Hatlehol (yellow card) 23'; Friðjónsson 37'; Sæthre (yellow card) 56'; Castro (yellow card) 70'	Stadium: Kristiansund Stadion; Attendance: 200; Referee: Kai Erik Steen

24 June 2020 3	Aalesund	2–2	Brann	Ålesund
18:00 CEST (UTC+2)	Sæthre (yellow card) 11'; Castro 30' (yellow card) 87'; Friðjónsson 72'; Uzochukwu (yellow card) 75'	Report	Forren (yellow card) 34'; Bamba 53', 59'	Stadium: Color Line Stadion; Attendance: 200; Referee: Espen Eskås

28 June 2020 4	Strømsgodset	1–1	Aalesund	Drammen
18:00 CEST (UTC+2)	Gunnarsson (yellow card) 53'; Maigaard 89' (pen.); Jack (red card) 90+5'	Report	Haugen 30' (yellow card) 47'; Sæthre (yellow card) 37'; Sno (yellow card) 43'; Uzochukwu (yellow card) 90'	Stadium: Marienlyst Stadion; Attendance: 200; Referee: Marius Hansen Grøtta

1 July 2020 5	Aalesund	1–3	Mjøndalen	Ålesund
18:00 CEST (UTC+2)	Haugen (yellow card) 48' (yellow-red card) 90'; Bizoza (yellow card) 60'; Castro 83' (pen.); Grønner (yellow card) 90+1'	Report	Aasmundsen (yellow card) 9'; Larsen (yellow card) 12'; Ibrahim 28'; Dragsnes 31'; Brochmann (yellow card) 41'; Liseth 90+8'	Stadium: Color Line Stadion; Attendance: 200; Referee: Sivert Amland

4 July 2020 6	Vålerenga	2–2	Aalesund	Oslo
20:30 CEST (UTC+2)	Jensen (yellow card) 30'; Adekugbe (yellow card) 49' (yellow-red card) 69'; Stokke 63'; Finne 65'	Report	Klinkenberg (yellow card) 24'; Friðjónsson 34', 46'; Castro (yellow card) 62'	Stadium: Intility Arena; Attendance: 200; Referee: Tom Harald Hagen

12 July 2020 7	Aalesund	1–6	Bodø/Glimt	Ålesund
18:00 CEST (UTC+2)	Friðjónsson 30' (yellow card) 33'; Grétarsson (yellow card) 48'	Report	Zinckernagel 14', 55'; Fet 32'; J.Hauge 35'; Bjørkan (yellow card) 40'; Saltnes 52'; Boniface 69'	Stadium: Color Line Stadion; Attendance: 200; Referee: Tore Hansen

15 July 2020 8	Sandefjord	1–0	Aalesund	Sandefjord
18:00 CEST (UTC+2)	Kralj (yellow card) 27'; Foss 37'; Brenden (yellow card) 87'; Hansen (yellow card) 88'	Report	Sno (yellow card) 80'	Stadium: Sandefjord Arena; Attendance: 0 Referee: Sivert Amland

19 July 2020 9	Aalesund	1–3	Stabæk	Ålesund
18:00 CEST (UTC+2)	Sæthre (yellow card) 19'; Sno (yellow card) 26'; Nordli 42'	Report	Kinoshita 7'; Edvardsen 61'; Hanche-Olsen 87' (pen.); Botheim (yellow card) 90'	Stadium: Color Line Stadion; Attendance: 200; Referee: Rohit Saggi

25 July 2020 10	Odd	3–2	Aalesund	Skien
18:00 CEST (UTC+2)	Lauritsen 11' (pen.); Kitolano (yellow card) 16'; Ruud (penalty missed) 30' 37'; Rashani (yellow card) 68'; Hoff (yellow card) 89'; Friðjónsson 90' (o.g.)	Report	Grétarsson (yellow card) 10'; Nordli 18' (yellow card) 74'; Ólafsson (yellow card) 21' (yellow-red card) 22'; Bizoza 43'; Kongshavn (yellow card) 79'; A.Lie (yellow card) 80'	Stadium: Skagerak Arena; Attendance: 200; Referee: Kai Erik Steen

29 July 2020 11	Aalesund	3–2	Start	Ålesund
18:00 CEST (UTC+2)	Friðjónsson 18', 61' (pen.), 80'; Castro (yellow card) 33'; Bizoza (yellow card) 65'; Määttä (yellow card) 90'	Report	Schulze (yellow card) 14' (goal) 19'; Bringaker 16'; E.Wichne (yellow card) 39'; Segberg (yellow card) 78'	Stadium: Color Line Stadion; Attendance: 200; Referee: Ola Hobber Nilsen

2 August 2020 12	Sarpsborg 08	4–0	Aalesund	Sarpsborg
18:00 CEST (UTC+2)	Coulibaly 48'; Abdellaoue 52' (pen.), 63' (penalty missed) 59'; Soltvedt 90+2'	Report	Bizoza (yellow card) 62'	Stadium: Sarpsborg Stadion; Attendance: 200; Referee: Tom Harald Hagen

9 August 2020 13	Aalesund	2–2	Viking	Ålesund
18:00 CEST (UTC+2)	Larsen 6'; Bizoza (yellow card) 37'; Sno (yellow card) 40'; Castro 80' (pen.)	Report	Berisha 24', 41' (pen.) (yellow card) 78'; Løkberg (yellow card) 75'; Torsteinbø (yellow card) 79'; Bell (yellow card) 85'	Stadium: Color Line Stadion; Attendance: 200; Referee: Tommy Skjerven

16 August 2020 14	Rosenborg	3–2	Aalesund	Trondheim
20:30 CEST (UTC+2)	Islamović 32' (pen.), 34' (yellow card) 38'; Zachariassen 45'	Report	Friðjónsson 16', 69'; Kongshavn (yellow card) 31'; Carlsen (yellow card) 45+2'; Bolkan Nordli (yellow card) 51'	Stadium: Lerkendal Stadion; Attendance: 200; Referee: Rohit Saggi

22 August 2020 15	Aalesund	1–3	Haugesund	Ålesund
18:00 CEST (UTC+2)	Friðjónsson 13'	Report	Leite (yellow card) 22'; Wadji 25'; Sandberg 34' (pen.), 58'	Stadium: Color Line Stadion; Attendance: 200; Referee: Tom Harald Hagen

30 August 2020 16	Start	1–0	Aalesund	Kristiansand
18:00 CEST (UTC+2)	Twum 29'; Jørgensen (yellow card) 45'; Børufsen (yellow card) 90+3'; Kabran (yellow card) 90+4'	Report	Grønner (yellow card) 90'	Stadium: Sør Arena; Attendance: 200; Referee: Dag Vidar Hafsås

13 September 2020 17	Aalesund	0–1	Sarpsborg 08	Ålesund
18:00 CEST (UTC+2)	Castro (yellow card) 45+2'	Report	Heintz 48'; Utvik (yellow card) 81'; Nilsson (yellow card) 86'	Stadium: Color Line Stadion; Attendance: 200; Referee: Tommy Skjerven

20 September 2020 18	Viking	5–2	Aalesund	Stavanger
18:00 CEST (UTC+2)	Bytyqi 5', 73' (yellow card) 57'; Vikstøl (yellow card) 32' Heggheim (yellow card) 49'; Berisha 65' (pen.); Vikstøl 75'; Ibrahimaj (yellow card) 81'; Bell 90+2'	Report	Nordli 26' (pen.); Nenass (yellow card) 66'; Haugen (yellow card) 75' (goal) 82' (pen.)	Stadium: Viking Stadion; Attendance: 200; Referee: Kristoffer Hagenes

27 September 2020 19	Aalesund	1–2	Rosenborg	Ålesund
18:00 CEST (UTC+2)	Larsen (yellow card) 43'; Haugen 62' (yellow card) 83'; Carlsen (yellow card) 73'; Grønner (yellow card) 89'; Castro (yellow card) 90+2'	Report	Zachariassen 41', 68'	Stadium: Color Line Stadion; Attendance: 200; Referee: Mohammad Usman Aslam

4 October 2020 20	Aalesund	1–2	Kristiansund	Ålesund
18:00 CEST (UTC+2)	Karlsbakk 28'; Karamoko (yellow card) 87'; Haugen (yellow card) 90+6'	Report	Aasbak (yellow card) 3'; Moumbagna 53' (yellow card) 55'; Kalludra 65'; Kastrati (yellow card) 86'; P.Ulvestad (yellow card) 90+6'	Stadium: Color Line Stadion; Attendance: 200; Referee: Rohit Saggi

18 October 2020 21	Stabæk	4–0	Aalesund	Bærum
18:00 CEST (UTC+2)	Bohinen 39'; Edvardsen 52'; Solheim 58'; Valsvik 81'	Report	Castro (yellow card) 25'; A.Lie (yellow card) 29'; Karamoko (yellow card) 34'; Bizoza (yellow card) 54'	Stadium: Nadderud Stadion; Attendance: 387; Referee: Dag Vidar Hafsås

25 October 2020 22	Aalesund	0–3	Odd	Ålesund
18:00 CET (UTC+1)	Uzochukwu (yellow card) 36'; Haugen (yellow card) 67'; Jørgensen (yellow card) 86'	Report	Rodić (yellow card) 10'; Jos.Kitolano (yellow card) 27'; Bjørtuft 45+2'; Egell-Johnsen 64'; Bakenga 84'	Stadium: Color Line Stadion; Attendance: 600; Referee: Kai Erik Steen

31 October 2020 23	Haugesund	0–1	Aalesund	Haugesund
20:30 CET (UTC+1)	Sandberg (penalty missed) 61'; Krygård (yellow card) 87' Koné (yellow card) 90+1'	Report	Bizoza (yellow card) 27'; Ólafsson (yellow card) 67'; Castro 75'; Nenass (yellow card) 79'; Nordli (yellow card) 90+2'	Stadium: Haugesund Stadion; Attendance: 600; Referee: Tore Hansen

8 November 2020 24	Bodø/Glimt	7–0	Aalesund	Bodø
18:00 CET (UTC+1)	Vetlesen (yellow card) 28' (goal) 38'; Saltnes 44', 56'; Solbakken 70'; Junker 81', 90+3'; Bjørkan 90'	Report		Stadium: Aspmyra Stadion; Attendance: 600; Referee: Dag Vidar Hafsås

21 November 2020 25	Aalesund	1–1	Vålerenga	Ålesund
18:00 CET (UTC+1)	Bizoza 32'; Karamoko (yellow card) 55'; Jørgensen (yellow card) 90+2'; Haugen (yellow card) 90+6'	Report	Dønnum 64' (pen.)	Stadium: Color Line Stadion; Attendance: 0 Referee: Tommy Skjerven

28 November 2020 26	Brann	3–1	Aalesund	Bergen
18:00 CET (UTC+1)	Barmen (penalty missed) 21'; Bamba 36', 44', 61'; Kolskogen (yellow card) 88'	Report	Ólafsson (yellow card) 16'; Kongshavn (yellow card) 28'; Fiskerstrand 39'	Stadium: Brann Stadion; Attendance: 600; Referee: Ola Hobber Nilsen

2 December 2020 27	Aalesund	0–1	Sandefjord	Ålesund
18:00 CET (UTC+1)	Klinkenberg (yellow card) 15'; Grønner (yellow card) 54'; Haugen (yellow card) 58'	Report	Vega 34'; Mørk (yellow card) 89'	Stadium: Color Line Stadion; Attendance: 600; Referee: Marius Hansen Grøtta

6 December 2020 28	Molde	2–1	Aalesund	Molde
19:00 CET (UTC+1)	Eikrem 31'; James 79'	Report	Haugen (yellow card) 12' (goal) 90+4' (pen.); Nenass (yellow card) 69'	Stadium: Aker Stadion; Attendance: 600; Referee: Tore Hansen

9 December 2020 29	Aalesund	1–4	Strømsgodset	Ålesund
18:00 CET (UTC+1)	Grønner (yellow card) 39'; Karlsbakk 80'	Report	Hove 10'; Tokstad (yellow card) 14'; Mwimba 47' (o.g.); Salvesen 54'; Tchamba 63'	Stadium: Color Line Stadion; Attendance: 600; Referee: Sivert Amland

22 December 2020 30	Mjøndalen	3-0	Aalesund	Mjøndalen
18:00 CET (UTC+1)	Liseth 13'; Nakkim 17'; Gauseth 45+4' (pen.); Sveen (yellow card) 73'; Aasmundsen (yellow card) 87'	Report	Karamoko (yellow card) 39'; Hatlehol (yellow card) 60'	Stadium: Consto Arena; Attendance: 200; Referee: Dag Vidar Hafsås

==== Table ====
Pos	Team	Pld	W	D	L	GF	GA	GD	Pts	Qualification or relegation
12	Sarpsborg 08	30	8	8	14	33	43	−10	32	
13	Strømsgodset	30	7	10	13	41	57	−16	31	
14	Mjøndalen (O)	30	8	3	19	26	45	−19	27	Qualification for the relegation play-offs
15	Start (R)	30	6	9	15	33	56	−23	27	Relegation to First Division
16	Aalesund (R)	30	2	5	23	30	85	−55	11	Relegation to First Division

Source: Football Association of Norway (in Norwegian)
Rules for classification: 1) Points; 2) Goal difference; 3) Goals scored; 4) Head-to-head points; 5) Head-to-head goal difference; 6) Head-to-head away goals scored (only if between two teams); 7) Head-to-head goals scored; 8) Play-off (only used to decide champions or relegation).
(O) Play-off winners; (R) Relegated

=== Norwegian Cup ===
2020 First round	–
CEST (UTC+2)
Note: Cup cancelled on 10 September due to the COVID-19 pandemic in Norway.

== Squad statistics ==
As of match played 22 December 2020

=== Appearances and goals ===
No.	Pos	Nat	Player	Total		Eliteserien		Norwegian Cup	
No.	Pos	Nat	Player	Apps	Goals	Apps	Goals	Apps	Goals
1	GK	(Norway) NOR	Andreas Lie	16	0	15+1	0	0	0
2	DF	(Netherlands) NED	Shaquill Sno	23	0	11+12	0	0	0
4	DF	(Norway) NOR	Jonas Grønner	26	0	22+4	0	0	0
5	DF	(Norway) NOR	Oddbjørn Lie	13	0	9+4	0	0	0
6	DF	(Netherlands) NED	Daan Klinkenberg	27	0	19+8	0	0	0
7	MF	(Cape Verde) CPV	Nenass	14	0	12+2	0	0	0
8	MF	(Norway) NOR	Fredrik Carlsen	14	0	12+2	0	0	0
9	FW	(Chile) CHI	Niklas Castro	24	4	23+1	4	0	0
11	MF	(Norway) NOR	Simen Nordli	28	4	26+2	4	0	0
15	FW	(Norway) NOR	Ståle Sæthre	18	0	11+7	0	0	0
16	DF	(Norway) NOR	Jørgen Hatlehol	14	0	9+5	0	0	0
17	FW	(Senegal) SEN	Mamadou Diaw	4	0	0+4	0	0	0
18	DF	(Iceland) ISL	Davíð Ólafsson	27	0	24+3	0	0	0
19	MF	(Norway) NOR	Peter Larsen	21	1	12+9	1	0	0
20	DF	(Burundi) BDI	Parfait Bizoza	23	2	18+5	2	0	0
21	DF	(Denmark) DEN	Kasper Jørgensen	10	0	10	0	0	0
22	FW	(Norway) NOR	Sigurd Haugen	25	4	20+5	4	0	0
24	GK	(Norway) NOR	Enock Mwimba	2	0	1+1	0	0	0
25	GK	(Norway) NOR	Gudmund Kongshavn	14	0	14	0	0	0
27	DF	(Norway) NOR	Sigurd Tafjord	4	0	0+4	0	0	0
30	MF	(Nigeria) NGA	Izunna Uzochukwu	24	0	6+18	0	0	0
32	MF	(Norway) NOR	Kristoffer Ødven	2	0	0+2	0	0	0
36	FW	(Norway) NOR	Vetle Fiskerstrand	8	1	4+4	1	0	0
38	FW	(Norway) NOR	Isak Määttä	12	0	10+2	0	0	0
39	DF	(Ivory Coast) CIV	Benjamin Karamoko	11	0	11	0	0	0
41	MF	(Norway) NOR	Markus Karlsbakk	19	2	4+15	2	0	0
Players away from Aalesund on loan:
28	DF	(Norway) NOR	Håvard Breivik	1	0	0+1	0	0	0
Players who left Aalesund during the season
3	DF	(Iceland) ISL	Daníel Grétarsson	14	0	13+1	0	0	0
10	FW	(Iceland) ISL	Hólmbert Friðjónsson	15	11	13+2	11	0	0
14	MF	(England) ENG	Jordon Mutch	1	0	0+1	0	0	0

=== Goal scorers ===
Place	Position	Nation	Number	Name	Eliteserien	Norwegian Cup	Total
1	FW	(Iceland)	10	Hólmbert Friðjónsson	11	0	11
2	MF	(Norway)	11	Simen Nordli	4	0	4
2	FW	(Chile)	9	Niklas Castro	4	0	4
2	MF	(Norway)	22	Sigurd Haugen	4	0	4
5	DF	(Burundi)	20	Parfait Bizoza	2	0	2
5	MF	(Norway)	41	Markus Karlsbakk	2	0	2
7	MF	(Norway)	19	Peter Larsen	1	0	1
7	FW	(Norway)	36	Vetle Fiskerstrand	1	0	1
7				Own goal	1	0	1
				TOTALS	30	0	30

=== Clean sheets ===
Place	Position	Nation	Number	Name	Eliteserien	Norwegian Cup	Total
1	GK	(Norway)	25	Gudmund Kongshavn	1	0	1
				TOTALS	1	0	1

=== Disciplinary record ===
Number	Nation	Position	Name	Eliteserien		Norwegian Cup		Total	
Number	Nation	Position	Name	Booked	Sent off (straight red)	Booked	Sent off (straight red)	Booked	Sent off (straight red)
1	(Norway)	GK	Andreas Lie	2	0	0	0	2	0
2	(Netherlands)	DF	Shaquill Sno	4	0	0	0	4	0
4	(Norway)	DF	Jonas Grønner	5	0	0	0	5	0
5	(Norway)	DF	Oddbjørn Lie	1	0	0	0	1	0
6	(Netherlands)	DF	Daan Klinkenberg	2	0	0	0	2	0
7	(Cape Verde)	MF	Nenass	3	0	0	0	3	0
8	(Norway)	MF	Fredrik Carlsen	2	0	0	0	2	0
9	(Chile)	FW	Niklas Castro	7	0	0	0	7	0
11	(Norway)	MF	Simen Nordli	3	0	0	0	3	0
15	(Norway)	FW	Ståle Sæthre	4	0	0	0	4	0
16	(Norway)	DF	Jørgen Hatlehol	2	0	0	0	2	0
18	(Iceland)	DF	Davíð Ólafsson	5	1	0	0	5	1
19	(Norway)	MF	Peter Larsen	1	0	0	0	1	0
20	(Burundi)	DF	Parfait Bizoza	6	0	0	0	6	0
21	(Norway)	DF	Kasper Jørgensen	1	0	0	0	1	0
22	(Norway)	FW	Sigurd Haugen	10	1	0	0	10	1
25	(Norway)	GK	Gudmund Kongshavn	3	0	0	0	3	0
30	(Nigeria)	MF	Izunna Uzochukwu	3	0	0	0	3	0
38	(Norway)	FW	Isak Määttä	1	0	0	0	1	0
39	(Ivory Coast)	DF	Benjamin Karamoko	4	0	0	0	4	0
Players who left Brann during the season:
3	(Iceland)	DF	Daníel Grétarsson	2	0	0	0	2	0
10	(Iceland)	FW	Hólmbert Friðjónsson	1	0	0	0	1	0
			TOTALS	72	2	0	0	72	2
