= List of Danish football transfers winter 2022–23 =

This is a list of Danish football transfers for the 2022–23 winter transfer window. Only transfers featuring Danish Superliga are listed.

== Danish Superliga ==
Note: Flags indicate national team as has been defined under FIFA eligibility rules. Players may hold more than one non-FIFA nationality.

=== Copenhagen ===
In:

No.	Pos.	Nation	Player
9	MF	POR	Diogo Gonçalves (from (Portugal) Benfica)
25	FW	SWE	Jordan Larsson (on loan from (Germany) Schalke 04)

Out:

No.	Pos.	Nation	Player
18	FW	ISL	Orri Óskarsson (on loan to SønderjyskE)
34	DF	DEN	Victor Kristiansen (to (England) Leicester City)
51	GK	AUS	Mathew Ryan (to (Netherlands) AZ)
—	MF	DEN	Daniel Haarbo (on loan to Helsingør, previously on loan at (Switzerland) Wil)

=== Midtjylland ===
In:

No.	Pos.	Nation	Player
5	MF	URU	Emiliano Martínez (from (Brazil) Red Bull Bragantino, previously on loan)
10	MF	EGY	Emam Ashour (from (Egypt) Zamalek)
25	FW	KOS	Astrit Selmani (on loan from (Israel) Hapoel Be'er Sheva)
37	MF	SWE	Armin Gigović (on loan from (Russia) Rostov, previously on loan at OB)

Out:

No.	Pos.	Nation	Player
9	FW	GUI	Sory Kaba (on loan to (Wales) Cardiff City)
10	MF	BRA	Evander (to (United States) Portland Timbers)
19	MF	CIV	Chris Kouakou (to (Portugal) Mafra)
26	DF	COL	Pablo Ortíz (on loan to (Portugal) Mafra)
28	DF	DEN	Erik Sviatchenko (to (United States) Houston Dynamo)
36	FW	DEN	Anders Dreyer (to (Belgium) Anderlecht)
44	DF	DEN	Nikolas Dyhr (on loan to (Belgium) Kortrijk)
—	FW	DEN	Victor Lind (on loan to (Sweden) Norrköping, previously on loan at (Norway) HamKam)
—	DF	CIV	Ousmane Diomande (to (Portugal) Sporting, previously on loan at (Portugal) Mafra)

=== Silkeborg ===
In:

No.	Pos.	Nation	Player
22	MF	DEN	Lasse Vigen (from (Belgium) Zulte Waregem)

Out:

No.	Pos.	Nation	Player
11	FW	DEN	Nicklas Helenius (to AaB)
22	MF	SWE	Robert Gojani (to (Sweden) Kalmar)
28	DF	ARM	André Calisir (to (Sweden) Brommapojkarna)

=== Brøndby ===
In:

No.	Pos.	Nation	Player
4	DF	DEN	Frederik Winther (on loan from (Germany) FC Augsburg)
5	DF	DEN	Rasmus Lauritsen (from (Croatia) Dinamo Zagreb)
11	MF	NOR	Håkon Evjen (from (Netherlands) AZ)

Out:

No.	Pos.	Nation	Player
3	DF	NOR	Henrik Heggheim (on loan to (Norway) Vålerenga)
4	DF	NOR	Sigurd Rosted (to (Canada) Toronto)
5	DF	DEN	Andreas Maxsø (to (United States) Colorado Rapids)
20	FW	SWE	Oskar Fallenius (to (Sweden) Djurgården)
28	DF	DEN	Jens Martin Gammelby (to (Norway) HamKam)
29	MF	DEN	Peter Bjur (to AGF)

=== AaB ===
In:

No.	Pos.	Nation	Player
17	FW	DEN	Nicklas Helenius (from Silkeborg)
20	DF	DEN	Kasper Jørgensen (from Lyngby)
26	DF	DEN	Rasmus Thelander (from (Hungary) Ferencváros)
41	GK	GER	Nico Mantl (on loan from (Austria) Red Bull Salzburg)

Out:

No.	Pos.	Nation	Player
9	FW	SRB	Milan Makarić (on loan to (Serbia) Radnik Surdulica)
16	DF	FRA	Yahya Nadrani (to (Morocco) Wydad)
39	FW	DEN	Kasper Høgh (on loan to (Norway) Stabæk)
41	GK	SWE	Oscar Linnér (to (Sweden) Brommapojkarna)
—	DF	DEN	Anders Hagelskjær (to (Norway) Molde, previously on loan at (Norway) Sarpsborg)

=== Randers ===
In:

No.	Pos.	Nation	Player
4	DF	SWE	Carl Johansson (on loan from (Sweden) Göteborg)
17	MF	NOR	Simen Bolkan Nordli (from (Norway) Aalesunds)
19	DF	DEN	William Kaastrup (from Copenhagen youth)

Out:

No.	Pos.	Nation	Player
2	DF	DEN	Simon Graves (to (Italy) Palermo)
3	DF	SWE	Mattias Andersson (to (Sweden) Trelleborg)
44	FW	DEN	Nicolai Brock-Madsen (on loan to Fredericia)

=== Viborg ===
In:

No.	Pos.	Nation	Player
11	FW	BRA	Renato Júnior (from (Brazil) Água Santa, previously on loan at (Brazil) Goiás)
28	MF	DEN	Magnus Westergaard (from Lyngby)
29	FW	POR	Paulinho (from (Portugal) Estrela Amadora)

Out:

No.	Pos.	Nation	Player
11	FW	NED	Jay-Roy Grot (to (Japan) Kashiwa Reysol)
18	DF	DEN	Jonas Thorsen (to SønderjyskE)
25	DF	GAM	Lamin Jawara (on loan to Holstebro)
—	FW	DEN	Christian Wagner (free agent, previously on loan at (Norway) Moss)

=== OB ===
In:

No.	Pos.	Nation	Player
7	MF	FIN	Naatan Skyttä (on loan from (France) Toulouse, previously on loan at (Norway) Viking)
17	FW	DEN	Kenneth Zohore (from (England) West Bromwich Albion)
18	FW	GAM	Musa Juwara (on loan from (Italy) Bologna)
24	MF	BIH	Alen Mustafić (from (Slovakia) Slovan Bratislava)

Out:

No.	Pos.	Nation	Player
7	FW	TUN	Issam Jebali (to (Japan) Gamba Osaka)
15	FW	DEN	Max Fenger (on loan to (Sweden) Mjällby)
20	MF	DEN	Ayo Simon Okosun (to Vendsyssel)
24	MF	SWE	Armin Gigović (loan return to (Russia) Rostov)
25	DF	AUS	Joel King (on loan to (Australia) Sydney)
—	DF	DEN	Kasper Larsen (to (Hungary) Fehérvár, previously on loan)
—	DF	THA	Jonathan Khemdee (to (Thailand) Ratchaburi, previously on loan at Næstved)

=== Nordsjælland ===
In:

No.	Pos.	Nation	Player
8	MF	DEN	Emiliano Marcondes (on loan from (England) Bournemouth)
19	MF	DEN	Zidan Sertdemir (from (Germany) Bayer Leverkusen)
25	GK	FIN	Carljohan Eriksson (on loan from (Scotland) Dundee United)

Out:

No.	Pos.	Nation	Player
3	DF	NOR	Ulrik Jenssen (to (Norway) Rosenborg)
7	MF	NOR	Andreas Schjelderup (to (Portugal) Benfica)
16	GK	GHA	Emmanuel Ogura (on loan to HIK)
22	MF	FIN	Oliver Antman (on loan to (Netherlands) Groningen)
24	FW	USA	Jonathan Amon (free agent)
32	DF	GHA	Willy Kumado (to Lyngby)
33	MF	FIN	Leo Walta (on loan to HB Køge)
34	FW	FIN	Maksim Stjopin (on loan to (Finland) HJK)
38	FW	SWE	Emil Roback (loan return to (Italy) Milan)
41	FW	CIV	Yannick Agnero (on loan to Fremad Amager)
—	DF	SVK	Ivan Mesík (to (Italy) Pescara, previously on loan at (Norway) Odd)
—	FW	CIV	Moussa Sangare (to (Slovakia) Podbrezová, previously on loan at Næstved)

=== AGF ===
In:

No.	Pos.	Nation	Player
2	DF	SWE	Felix Beijmo (on loan from (Sweden) Malmö)
20	FW	DEN	Mikkel Duelund (on loan from (Ukraine) Dynamo Kyiv, previously on loan at (Netherlands) NEC)
21	MF	DEN	Peter Bjur (from Brøndby)

Out:

No.	Pos.	Nation	Player
13	DF	DEN	Alexander Munksgaard (on loan to (Norway) Aalesund)
26	DF	BEL	Anthony D'Alberto (free agent)
27	FW	DEN	Sebastian Grønning (to (Greece) OFI Crete)
37	DF	DEN	Sebastian Hausner (to (Sweden) Göteborg)

=== Horsens ===
In:

No.	Pos.	Nation	Player
15	DF	DEN	Jacob Buus (from (Belgium) Beveren)
16	GK	SWE	Samuel Brolin (on loan from (Sweden) AIK, previously on loan at (Sweden) Mjällby)
28	DF	GAM	Alagie Saine (on loan from (The Gambia) Falcons)

Out:

No.	Pos.	Nation	Player
7	FW	DEN	Lirim Qamili (to Hvidovre)
—	GK	DEN	Anders Hoff (to (Faroe Islands) Tvøroyrar Bóltfelag, previously on loan at Middelfart)
—	MF	ISL	Ágúst Hlynsson (to (Iceland) Breiðablik, previously on loan at (Iceland) Valur)

=== Lyngby ===
In:

No.	Pos.	Nation	Player
4	DF	FRA	Baptiste Rolland (free agent)
7	DF	GHA	Willy Kumado (from Nordsjælland)
20	DF	ISL	Kolbeinn Finnsson (from (Germany) Borussia Dortmund II)
22	MF	BDI	Parfait Bizoza (from Vendsyssel)
32	DF	DEN	Johan Meyer (from Nordsjælland youth)
40	GK	DEN	Jannich Storch (from Nykøbing)

Out:

No.	Pos.	Nation	Player
4	DF	NED	Timo Letschert (to (South Korea) Gwangju)
7	FW	DEN	Emil Nielsen (to (United States) Orange County)
10	MF	DEN	Rasmus Thellufsen (to (United States) Louisville City)
11	FW	DEN	Magnus Kaastrup (on loan to (Sweden) Sirius)
17	DF	DEN	Adam Sørensen (to (Norway) Bodø/Glimt)
20	DF	DEN	Kasper Jørgensen (to AaB)
22	MF	DEN	Magnus Westergaard (to Viborg)
—	FW	DEN	Zean Dalügge (on loan to HB Køge, previously on loan at (Iceland) Leiknir)

== See also ==
- 2022–23 Danish Superliga
