= Espen Ramse Knudsen =

Norwegian footballer (born 1991)

Espen Knudsen
Personal information
- Full name: Espen Ramse Knudsen
- Date of birth: 5 March 1991 (age 35)
- Height: 1.80 m (5 ft 11 in)
- Position: Defender

Youth career
- –2009: Start

Senior career*
| Years | Team | Apps | (Gls) |
| 2010–2011 | Start | 28 | (1) |
| 2012–2020 | Jerv | 221 | (11) |

International career
| 2008 | Norway U17 | 12 | (1) |
| 2009 | Norway U18 | 4 | (0) |
| 2010 | Norway U19 | 7 | (0) |
- * Club domestic league appearances and goals as of 4 November 2020

Espen Ramse Knudsen (born 5 March 1991) is a Norwegian football defender.

He represented Norway as a youth international and came through the youth team of IK Start, and made his Eliteserien debut in 2010. In 2012 he joined FK Jerv; at the time a team of minnows which contested the 2013 3. divisjon, but Knudsen took part in successive promotions to the 2016 1. divisjon. At the end of the season, Jerv was only minutes away from yet another promotion, but ultimately lost the decisive playoff match. In 2020 Knudsen surpassed 200 league games for Jerv.
