= Shaquill Sno =

Dutch association football player

Personal information
- Full name: Shaquill Montell Sno
- Date of birth: 5 January 1996 (age 30)
- Place of birth: Amsterdam, Netherlands
- Height: 1.76 m (5 ft 9 in)
- Position: Full back

Team information
- Current team: Karvan İK
- Number: 2

Youth career
- –2004: Zeeburgia
- 2004–2015: Ajax

Senior career*
Years	Team	Apps	(Gls)
2013–2015	Jong Ajax	3	(0)
2017	Almere City	0	(0)
2017	Jong Almere City	10	(0)
2017–2020	Telstar	74	(2)
2020–2021	Aalesund	23	(0)
2021	Lokomotiv Plovdiv	9	(0)
2022–2023	Botoșani	16	(2)
2023	Mioveni	14	(0)
2025	Gżira United	15	(0)
2025-	Karvan İK	32	(1)

International career
2010	Netherlands U15	2	(0)
- * Club domestic league appearances and goals as of 22 June 2026

Shaquill Sno (born 5 January 1996) is a Dutch professional footballer who plays as a full back for Maltese Premier League club Gżira United.

== Career ==
Sno made his professional debut as a 63rd-minute substitute for Wang Chengkuai in an Eerste Divisie match against De Graafschap on 11 November 2013.

== Personal life ==
Born in the Netherlands, Sno is of Surinamese descent.
