= Jørgen Hatlehol =

Norwegian footballer (born 1997)

Personal information
- Date of birth: 18 June 1997 (age 29)
- Height: 1.85 m (6 ft 1 in)
- Position: Defender

Team information
- Current team: Ravn

Youth career
- –2016: Aalesund

Senior career*
Years	Team	Apps	(Gls)
2017–2022	Aalesund	93	(4)
2022–2023	Bryne	25	(1)
2024–	Ravn	9	(2)
- * Club domestic league appearances and goals as of 4 March 2025

Jørgen Hatlehol (born 18 June 1997) is a Norwegian professional footballer who played as a defender for Aalesund and Bryne.

He hails from Vatne. He came through Aalesund's youth ranks. In 2021 he played his 100th game for AaFK, cup and playoff matches included.
