= Vetle Fiskerstrand =

Norwegian footballer (born 2000)

Personal information
- Date of birth: 14 March 2000 (age 26)
- Position: Striker

Team information
- Current team: Langevåg

Youth career
- 2006–2016: Langevåg
- 2018–2019: Aalesund

Senior career*
Years	Team	Apps	(Gls)
2016–2017	Langevåg	15	(7)
2019–2020	Aalesund	10	(1)
2021–2022	Florø	17	(1)
2023	Langevåg	14	(3)
- * Club domestic league appearances and goals as of 29 September 2023

Vetle Fiskerstrand (born 14 March 2000) is a Norwegian football striker who plays for Langevåg.

Hailing from Sula Municipality, he grew up in the club Langevåg IL and played several senior matches in 2016 and a couple in 2017. In 2018 he joined the junior team of Aalesunds FK. He made his senior debut in the 2019 1. divisjon in April 2019, and his 2020 Eliteserien debut in July 2020. In November 2020 he scored his first Eliteserien goal. Ahead of the 2021 season he went on to Florø SK.

His father Arnt Vidar Fiskerstrand got 341 games for Aalesund across all competitions. His father coached Vetle's successive teams from age 6 to 16.
