= Izunna Uzochukwu =

Nigerian footballer (born 1990)

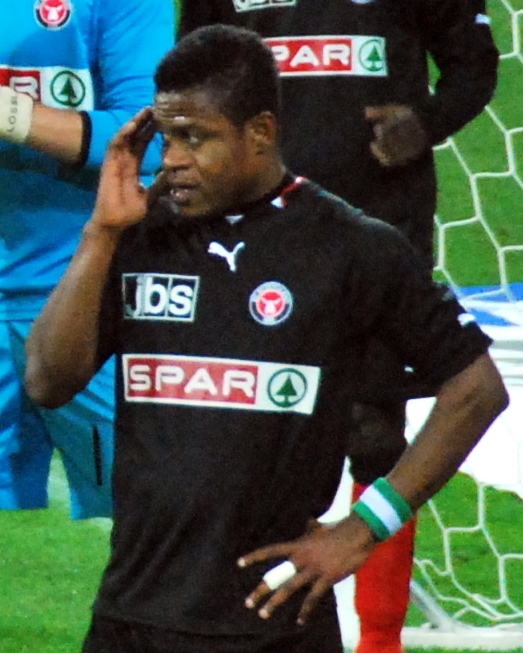
- Uzochukwu in 2012

Personal information
- Full name: Izunna Arnest Uzochukwu
- Date of birth: 11 April 1990 (age 36)
- Place of birth: Nigeria
- Height: 1.71 m (5 ft 7 in)
- Position: Defensive midfielder

Team information
- Current team: OKS

Youth career
- –2004: Makbet
- 2004–2006: Ebedei
- 2006–2009: Midtjylland

Senior career*
Years	Team	Apps	(Gls)
2009–2015	Midtjylland	150	(4)
2015–2016	Amkar Perm	9	(0)
2016–2018	OB	52	(1)
2018–2019	Meizhou Hakka	8	(0)
2019–2021	Aalesund	36	(0)
2021	Honka	13	(0)
2022–2023	B1909		
2024–	OKS		

International career
2015	Nigeria	1	(0)

Managerial career
- 2023: B1909 (player-assistant)
- * Club domestic league appearances and goals as of 31 October 2021

Izunna Arnest Uzochukwu (born 11 April 1990) is a Nigerian professional footballer who plays for Denmark Series club OKS.

== Career ==
=== Club ===
During the summer of 2013, Uzochukwu was subject to a transfer bid from Valenciennes, but the deal fell through.

In July 2015, Uzochukwu signed a three-year contract with Russian Premier League side Amkar Perm.

He returned to Denmark in January 2016 to play for OB. He left the club by mutual termination on 2 January 2018.

Uzochukw joined China League One side Meizhou Hakka on 29 January 2018.

At the end of March 2022, Uzochukwu joined Danish amateur club B1909. In January 2023, the club confirmed that Uzochukwu would serve as a playing assistant coach going forward. In December 2023, Uzochukwu was expelled from Denmark when his residence permit was taken away from him on January 1, 2018, when he switched to Chinese MZ Hakka, despite having a girlfriend and a daughter in Denmark. By March 2024, Izunna would be back in Denmark, confirmed the Funen-based club, OKS. Here, Izunna would serve as a player until the summer, after which he would serve as a playing assistant coach from the upcoming 2024-25 season.

=== International ===
Uzochukwu was called up to the Nigeria national team for the first time in September 2015, making his debut against Tanzania on 5 September.

== Career statistics ==
=== Club ===
As of match played 22 December 2020

Appearances and goals by club, season and competition
Club	Season	League			National Cup		Continental		Total	
Club	Season	Division	Apps	Goals	Apps	Goals	Apps	Goals	Apps	Goals
Midtjylland	2008–09	Danish Superliga	2	0	0	0	–		2	0
Midtjylland	2009–10	Danish Superliga	21	1	4	0	–		25	1
Midtjylland	2010–11	Danish Superliga	30	2	4	0	–		34	2
Midtjylland	2011–12	Danish Superliga	30	0	1	0	4	0	35	0
Midtjylland	2012–13	Danish Superliga	26	0	2	0	2	0	30	0
Midtjylland	2013–14	Danish Superliga	19	1	1	0	2	0	22	1
Midtjylland	2014–15	Danish Superliga	22	0	0	0	–		0	0
Midtjylland	Total		150	4	12	0	8	0	170	4
Amkar Perm	2015–16	Russian Premier League	9	0	2	0	–		11	0
Odense BK	2015–16	Danish Superliga	14	0	0	0	–		14	0
Odense BK	2016–17	Danish Superliga	24	0	0	0	–		24	0
Odense BK	2017–18	Danish Superliga	14	1	0	0	–		14	1
Odense BK	Total		52	1	0	0	–	–	52	1
Meizhou Hakka	2018	China League One	8	0	0	0	–		8	0
Aalesund	2019	1. divisjon	12	0	3	0	–		15	0
Aalesund	2020	Eliteserien	24	0	0	0	–		24	0
Aalesund	Total		36	0	3	0	–	–	39	0
Honka	2021	Veikkausliiga	13	0	0	0	0	0	13	0
Career total			268	5	17	0	8	0	293	5

=== International ===
Nigeria
Year	Apps	Goals
2015	1	0
Total	1	0

Statistics accurate as of match played 5 September 2015

== Honours ==
=== Club ===
Midtjylland

- Danish Superliga (1): 2014–15
