= Daan Klinkenberg =

Dutch footballer (born 1996)

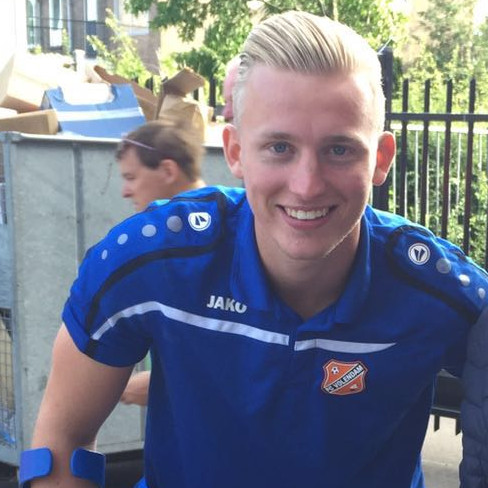

Personal information
- Full name: Frederikus Quirinus Klinkenberg
- Date of birth: 12 January 1996 (age 30)
- Place of birth: Beinsdorp, Netherlands
- Height: 1.86 m (6 ft 1 in)
- Position: Centre-back

Team information
- Current team: Lisse
- Number: 3

Youth career
- VV Hillegom
- 2007–2008: AZ
- 2009–2010: HFC Haarlem
- 2010–2015: Volendam

Senior career*
Years	Team	Apps	(Gls)
2015–2019	Volendam	43	(0)
2019	Inter Turku	23	(1)
2020–2021	Aalesund	27	(0)
2021	Mjällby AIF	7	(0)
2022	HIFK	19	(0)
2023	KTP	20	(0)
2023–	Lisse	28	(1)
- * Club domestic league appearances and goals as of 7 October 2024

Frederikus Quirinus "Daan" Klinkenberg (born 12 January 1996) is a Dutch footballer who plays as a centre-back for Lisse. He has played in the Netherlands, Finland, Norway and Sweden.

== Club career ==
He made his professional debut in the Eerste Divisie for FC Volendam on 29 January 2016 in a game against VVV-Venlo.

On 12 January 2019, his contract with FC Volendam was dissolved by mutual consent. Five days later, he then joined FC Inter Turku in Finland on a one-year contract.

On 31 December 2021, he returned to Finland and joined HIFK on a one-year contract with an option to extend.

On 21 November 2022, Klinkenberg signed a two-year contract with KTP.
