= Benjamin Karamoko =

Ivorian footballer (born 1995)

Personal information
- Full name: Benjamin Kantie Karamoko
- Date of birth: 17 May 1995 (age 31)
- Place of birth: Paris, France
- Height: 1.95 m (6 ft 5 in)
- Position: Defender

Team information
- Current team: Lokomotiv Gorna Oryahovitsa
- Number: 21

Youth career
- 2012–2015: Saint-Étienne

Senior career*
Years	Team	Apps	(Gls)
2015–2018	Saint-Étienne	3	(0)
2016–2017	→ US Créteil (loan)	10	(0)
2018–2020	Haugesund	23	(2)
2020	→ Aalesund (loan)	11	(0)
2021–2022	Sarpsborg 08	23	(0)
2022–2023	Charleroi	0	(0)
2023	Spartak Varna	15	(0)
2026-	Lokomotiv Gorna Oryahovitsa	3	(0)

International career
2016	Ivory Coast U23	2	(0)
- * Club domestic league appearances and goals as of 3 November 2025

Benjamin Kantie Karamoko (born 17 May 1995), known as Ben Karamoko, is an Ivorian footballer who plays as a defender for Bulgarian Second division side Lokomotiv Gorna Oryahovitsa.

== Club career ==
Karamoko is a youth exponent from Saint-Étienne. He made his Ligue 1 debut on 15 February 2015 against Girondins de Bordeaux replacing Paul Baysse at half-time in a 1–0 home win.

On 31 January 2022, Karamoko signed a 1.5-year contract with Charleroi in Belgium. In January 2023, he joined Bulgarian team Spartak Varna on a one-and-a-half-year contract.

== International career ==
Karamoko was born and raised in France, and is Ivorian by descent. He debuted for the Ivory Coast U23 in a 5–1 friendly loss to the France U21s in November 2016.
