= Peter Orry Larsen =

Norwegian footballer (born 1989)

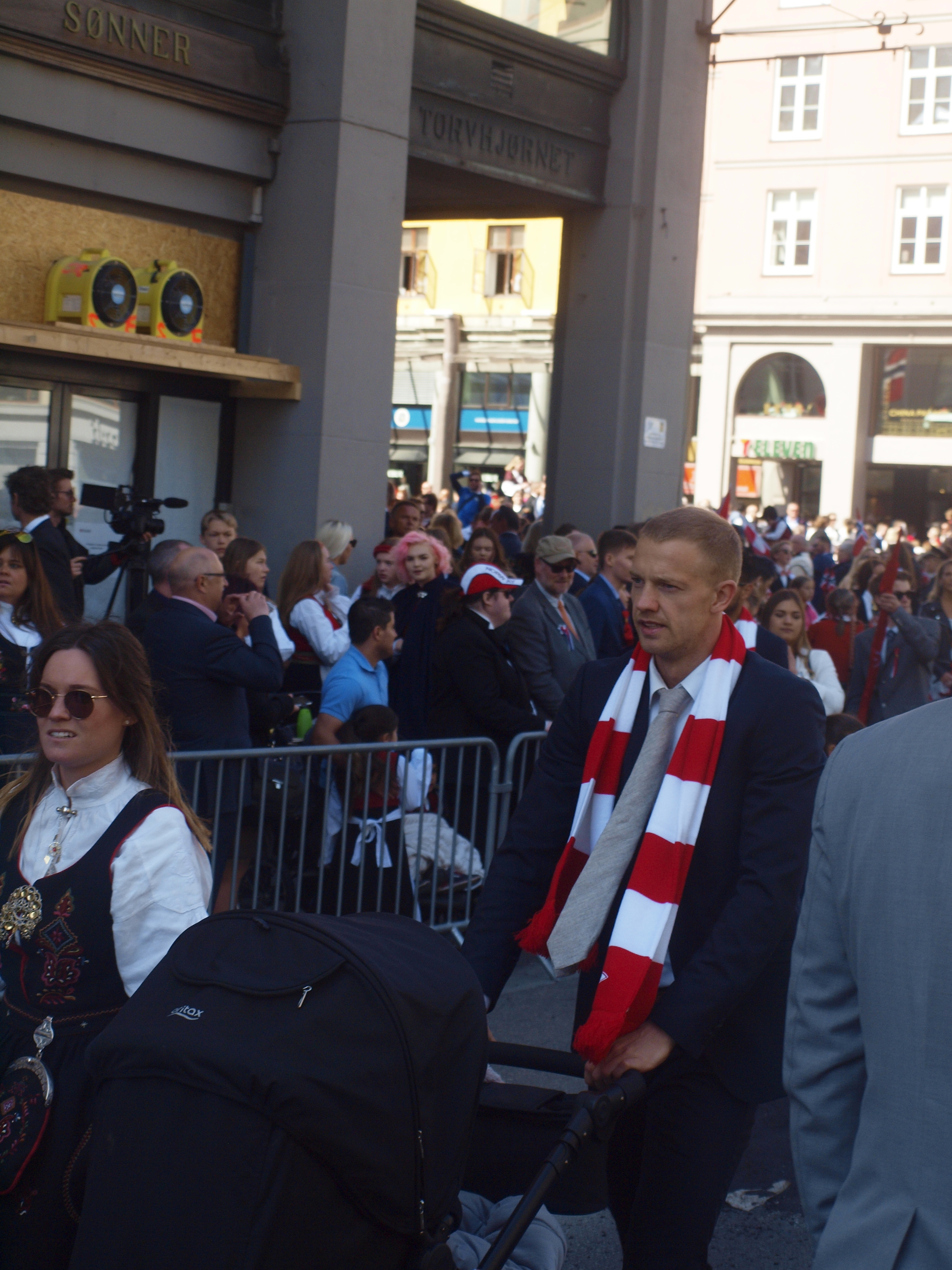

Personal information
- Date of birth: 25 February 1989 (age 37)
- Place of birth: Aveiro, Portugal
- Height: 1.84 m (6 ft 0 in)
- Position: Midfielder

Youth career
- Skavøypoll

Senior career*
Years	Team	Apps	(Gls)
2007–2016	Aalesund	218	(25)
2017–2018	Brann	40	(8)
2019–2020	Aalesund	34	(2)

International career
2004	Norway U-15	4	(0)
2005	Norway U-16	2	(0)
2006	Norway U-17	6	(0)
2007	Norway U-18	3	(0)
2008	Norway U-19	6	(4)
2008–2010	Norway U-21	13	(1)
2011–2013	Norway U-23	2	(0)
- * Club domestic league appearances and goals

Peter Orry Larsen (born 25 February 1989) is a Norwegian former footballer.

== Career ==
=== SK Brann ===
On 18 February 2017, Larsen signed for Brann

=== Back to Aalesund ===
Larsen rejoined Aalesund for the 2019 season, when he signed a two-year contract with the club on 3 December 2018.

== Career statistics ==
=== Club ===
As of match played 9 December 2020

Appearances and goals by club, season and competition
Club	Season	League			National Cup		Continental		Other		Total	
Club	Season	Division	Apps	Goals	Apps	Goals	Apps	Goals	Apps	Goals	Apps	Goals
Aalesund	2007	Tippeligaen	2	0	0	0	-		-		2	0
Aalesund	2008	Tippeligaen	19	2	4	0	-		-		23	2
Aalesund	2009	Tippeligaen	28	0	5	1	-		-		33	1
Aalesund	2010	Tippeligaen	26	2	1	0	2	0	1	1	30	3
Aalesund	2011	Tippeligaen	27	3	6	0	4	1	-		37	4
Aalesund	2012	Tippeligaen	18	0	1	0	-		-		19	0
Aalesund	2013	Tippeligaen	22	5	0	0	-		-		22	5
Aalesund	2014	Tippeligaen	26	5	2	0	-		-		28	5
Aalesund	2015	Tippeligaen	25	4	2	1	-		-		27	5
Aalesund	2016	Tippeligaen	25	4	2	0	-		-		27	4
Aalesund	Total		218	25	23	2	6	1	1	1	248	29
Brann	2017	Eliteserien	18	3	2	0	2	0	-		22	3
Brann	2018	Eliteserien	22	5	3	1	-		-		25	6
Brann	Total		40	8	5	1	2	0	-	-	47	9
Aalesund	2019	1. divisjon	12	1	3	0	-		-		15	1
Aalesund	2020	Eliteserien	22	1	0	0	-		-		22	1
Aalesund	Total		34	2	3	0	-	-	-	-	37	2
Career total			292	35	30	2	8	1	1	1	331	39
