= Ståle Steen Sæthre =

Norwegian footballer (born 1993)

Ståle Sæthre
Personal information
- Full name: Ståle Stålinho Steen Sæthre
- Date of birth: 2 April 1993 (age 33)
- Height: 1.77 m (5 ft 9 1/2 in)
- Positions: Forward; defender

Team information
- Current team: Madla (player-coach)

Youth career
- –2009: Trane
- 2009: Ullern
- 2010: Lyn
- 2010–2011: Bærum
- 2011–2012: Stabæk

Senior career*
Years	Team	Apps	(Gls)
2012	Stabæk	3	(0)
2012–2013	Asker	20	(3)
2013–2014	Fyllingsdalen	29	(2)
2015	Førde	6	(2)
2015–2016	Lysekloster	39	(16)
2017–2018	Nest-Sotra	40	(10)
2018–2020	Aalesund	48	(2)
2021–2022	Sandnes Ulf	43	(2)
2022	HIFK	9	(0)
2023	Sandnes Ulf 2	5	(0)
2024–	Madla	1	(0)

Managerial career
- 2024–2025: Madla (player-coach)
- 2026–: Vard Haugesund
- * Club domestic league appearances and goals as of 12 November 2025

Ståle Steen Sæthre (born 2 April 1993) is a Norwegian professional football manager and former player who currently manages Norwegian Third Division club Vard Haugesund.

He hails from Fusa Municipality but moved east in 2009 to attend the Norwegian College of Elite Sport in Bærum and play for Ullern. He soon joined the youth team of Lyn. After Lyn's demise in early 2010 he went to Bærum's youth team, then in mid-2011 Stabæk.

He made his senior league debut for Stabæk as a substitute in the loss against Aalesunds FK in July 2012, and almost immediately got a yellow card. After just a few matches he signed for Asker.

In 2013, he played fairly regularly for Asker, also scoring a goal as Asker eliminated incumbent top league runners-up Strømsgodset from the 2013 Norwegian Football Cup. In the summer however he returned to his hometown Bergen and FK Fyllingsdalen.

After some time in Bergen, he played for Førde IL in 2015, returning to Hordaland and Lysekloster IL in the summer that year. After a trial with Icelandic ÍBV in the winter of 2017, he started the 2017 season for Nest-Sotra. In the 2018 summer window he signed for Aalesund.

== Career statistics ==
=== Club ===
As of 2 December 2024

Appearances and goals by club, season and competition
Club	Season	League			National Cup		Total	
Club	Season	Division	Apps	Goals	Apps	Goals	Apps	Goals
Stabæk	2012	Tippeligaen	3	0	0	0	3	0
Asker	2012	2. divisjon	7	1	0	0	7	1
Asker	2013	2. divisjon	13	2	3	1	16	3
Asker	Total		20	3	3	1	23	4
Fyllingsdalen	2013	2. divisjon	10	2	0	0	10	2
Fyllingsdalen	2014	2. divisjon	19	0	3	0	22	0
Fyllingsdalen	Total		29	2	3	0	32	2
Førde	2015	2. divisjon	6	2	1	0	7	2
Lysekloster	2015	3. divisjon	15	8	0	0	15	8
Lysekloster	2016	2. divisjon	24	8	2	2	26	10
Lysekloster	Total		39	16	2	2	41	18
Nest-Sotra	2017	2. divisjon	25	5	2	0	27	5
Nest-Sotra	2018	1. divisjon	15	5	3	1	18	6
Nest-Sotra	Total		40	10	5	1	45	11
Aalesund	2018	1. divisjon	10	1	0	0	10	1
Aalesund	2019	1. divisjon	20	1	5	2	25	3
Aalesund	2020	Eliteserien	18	0	0	0	18	0
Aalesund	Total		48	2	5	2	53	4
Sandnes Ulf	2021	1. divisjon	27	1	1	0	28	1
Sandnes Ulf	2022	1. divisjon	16	1	3	0	19	1
Sandnes Ulf	Total		43	2	4	0	47	2
HIFK	2022	Veikkausliiga	9	0	1	0	10	0
Sandnes Ulf 2	2023	3. divisjon	4	0	–		4	0
Madla	2024	3. divisjon	1	0	0	0	1	0
Career total			242	36	24	6	266	42
