= Kasper Jørgensen (footballer) =

Danish footballer (born 1999)

Personal information
- Full name: Kasper Poul Mølgaard Jørgensen
- Date of birth: 7 November 1999 (age 27)
- Place of birth: Denmark
- Position: Right-back

Team information
- Current team: LASK
- Number: 20

Youth career
- –2018: Nordsjælland
- 2018–2019: Brøndby

Senior career*
Years	Team	Apps	(Gls)
2019–2023	Lyngby	87	(8)
2020	→ Aalesund (loan)	10	(0)
2023–2025	AaB	69	(11)
2025–	LASK	38	(7)

International career
2016–2017	Denmark U18	5	(1)
2017–2018	Denmark U19	5	(1)
2020	Denmark U21	1	(0)
- * Club domestic league appearances and goals as of 17 October 2026

Kasper Poul Mølgaard Jørgensen (Danish pronunciation: [ˈkʰɛspɐ ˈjɶɐ̯ˀnsn̩]; born 7 November 1999) is a Danish professional footballer who plays as a right-back for Austrian Football Bundesliga club LASK.

== Club career ==
=== Early career ===
Jørgensen is a youth product of the FC Nordsjælland academy and joined Brøndby IF at the age of 18 in the summer 2018, to play for the club's under-19s. He was a regular starter for the team, but left the club at the end of his one-year contract in June 2019.

=== Lyngby ===
On 11 July 2019, Jørgensen signed his first professional contract with Lyngby Boldklub after a short trial at the club. Jørgensen signed a three-year deal and began his debut less than two weeks later on 22 July, in a Danish Superliga game against Odense Boldklub. Jørgensen started on the bench, before replacing Adnan Mohammad in the 64th minute.

==== Loan to Aalesunds FK ====
On 5 October 2020, it was confirmed, that Jørgensen would play on loan for Norwegian club Aalesunds FK for the rest of 2020.

=== AaB ===
On 9 January 2023 AaB confirmed that Jørgensen had signed with the club until the end of 2025. AaB reportedly paid just over DKK 5 million for Jørgensen.

=== LASK ===
On 12 June 2025, Jørgensen was sold to Austrian Football Bundesliga club LASK, signing a deal until June 2028.

== Career statistics ==
As of match played 3 November 2026

Appearances and goals by club, season and competition
Club	Season	League			National cup (Note: Includes Danish Cup, Austrian Cup)		Europe		Total	
Club	Season	Division	Apps	Goals	Apps	Goals	Apps	Goals	Apps	Goals
Lyngby	2019–20	Danish Superliga	19	0	1	0	—		20	0
Lyngby	2020–21	Danish Superliga	20	1	0	0	—		20	1
Lyngby	2021–22	Danish 1st Division	31	3	2	0	—		33	3
Lyngby	2022–23	Danish Superliga	17	4	1	0	—		10	2
Lyngby	Total		87	8	4	0	—		91	8
Aalesunds FK (loan)	2020	Eliteserien	10	0	0	0	—		10	0
AaB	2022–23	Danish Superliga	8	0	4	0	—		12	0
AaB	2023–24	Danish 1st Division	31	7	2	0	—		33	7
AaB	2024–25	Danish Superliga	30	4	5	0	—		35	4
AaB	Total		69	11	11	0	—		80	11
LASK	2025–26	Austrian Bundesliga	31	7	6	0	—		37	7
LASK	2026–27	Austrian Bundesliga	7	0	3	0	6 (Note: Appearances in UEFA Champions League)	2	16	2
LASK	Total		38	7	9	0	6	2	53	9
Career total			204	26	24	0	6	2	234	28

== Honours ==
LASK

- Austrian Bundesliga: 2025–26
- Austrian Cup: 2025–26
