= Parfait Bizoza =

Burundian footballer (born 1999)

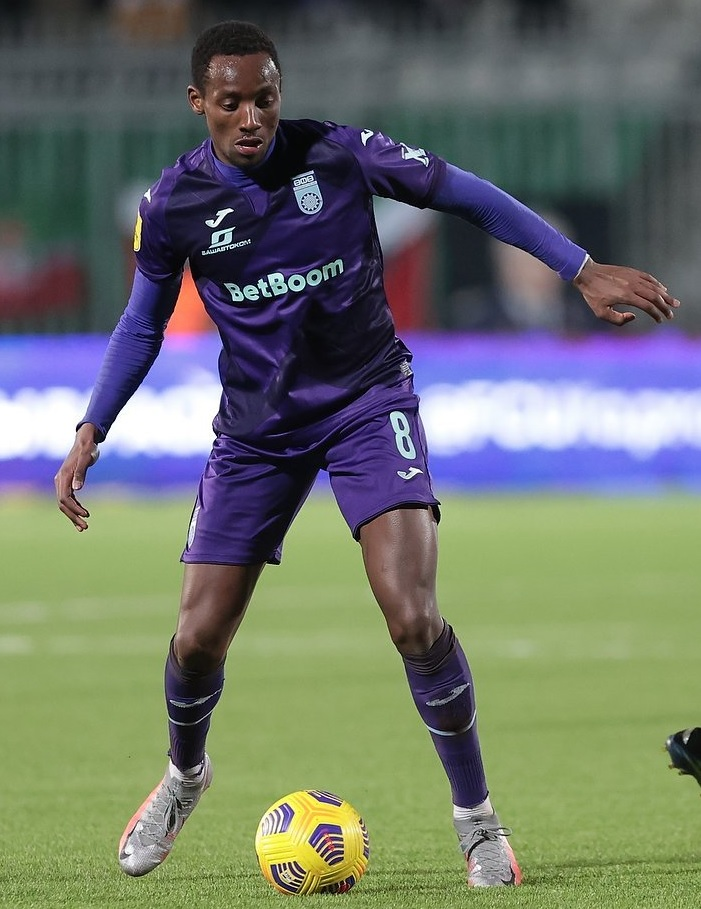
- Bizoza with FC Ufa in 2021

Personal information
- Date of birth: 3 March 1999 (age 27)
- Place of birth: Burundi
- Height: 1.87 m (6 ft 2 in)
- Position: Midfielder

Team information
- Current team: FK Panevėžys
- Number: 77

Youth career
- –2014: Ravn
- 2015–2017: Aalesund

Senior career*
| Years | Team | Apps | (Gls) |
| 2017–2018 | Herd | 46 | (15) |
| 2019 | Raufoss | 27 | (3) |
| 2020–2021 | Aalesund | 23 | (2) |
| 2021 | Ufa | 9 | (0) |
| 2021–2023 | Vendsyssel | 38 | (4) |
| 2023–2024 | Lyngby | 11 | (0) |
| 2024–2026 | Haugesund | 53 | (2) |
| 2026– | FK Panevėžys | 10 | (1) |

International career^{‡}
| 2025– | Burundi | 7 | (0) |
- * Club domestic league appearances and goals as of 11 August 2026 ‡ National team caps and goals as of 13 July 2026 (UTC)

Parfait Bizoza (born 3 March 1999) is a Burundian professional footballer who plays for Panevėžys Club in TOPLYGA and the Burundi national team.

== Club career ==
Bizoza was born in a refugee camp, and came to Norway at the age of 4.

Growing up in Skodje Municipality, he started playing for IL Ravn as a child. He was a junior player for Aalesunds FK from 2015 to 2017, leaving to pursue a senior career in local SK Herd. He was picked up by newly promoted second-tier club Raufoss IL in 2019, and after impressing there he was deemed good enough for Aalesund. He made his debut for Aalesund in July 2020 against Mjøndalen.

On 19 February 2021, he signed a 3.5-year contract with Russian Premier League club FC Ufa. He made his league debut for FC Ufa on 7 March 2021 in the away game against FC Ural Yekaterinburg, where he was sent-off just 14 minutes after start.

On 28 August 2021, Ufa announced his transfer to Vendsyssel FF in Denmark. On transfer deadline day, 31 January 2023, Bizoza joined Danish Superliga club Lyngby Boldklub on a deal until June 2025. On 14 June 2024, Bizoza signed a contract until the end of 2027 with Norwegian Eliteserien club FK Haugesund.

== International career ==
In late 2019, while a Norwegian citizen, Bizoza was called up to the Burundi national football team.
