= 2016 Vålerenga Fotball season =

Vålerenga
2016 season
- Chairman: Thomas Baardseng
- Manager: Kjetil Rekdal
- Stadium: Ullevaal Stadion
- Tippeligaen: 10th
- Norwegian Cup: Quarterfinal vs Strømsgodset
- Top goalscorer: League: Ghayas Zahid (8); All: Deshorn Brown (10)
Home colours	Away colours	Third colours

Vålerenga Fotball is a Norwegian association football club from Oslo. They play their home games at Ullevaal Stadion which has a capacity of 28,972. During the 2016 campaign they will compete in Tippeligaen and the Norwegian Cup.

== Squad ==
As of 19 August 2016

Note: Flags indicate national team as defined under FIFA eligibility rules; some limited exceptions apply. Players may hold more than one non-FIFA nationality.

No.	Pos.	Nation	Player
1	GK	SWE	Marcus Sandberg
3	DF	EST	Enar Jääger
4	DF	NOR	Jonatan Tollås
5	DF	SWE	Robert Lundström
6	DF	NOR	Simon Larsen
7	FW	NOR	Daniel Fredheim Holm
8	MF	NOR	Magnus Lekven
9	MF	SWE	Rasmus Lindkvist
10	MF	NOR	Ghayas Zahid
14	MF	NOR	Herman Stengel
15	DF	NOR	Markus Nakkim
16	MF	NOR	Vajebah Sakor (on loan from Juventus)
17	MF	NOR	Niklas Castro
18	MF	NOR	Rino Falk Larsen
19	MF	NOR	Christian Grindheim (Captain)
20	FW	NOR	Henrik Kjelsrud Johansen
21	MF	NOR	Simen Juklerød

No.	Pos.	Nation	Player
23	MF	NOR	Sander Berge
24	DF	NOR	Kjetil Wæhler
25	FW	NOR	Mohammed Abdellaoue
28	FW	NOR	Thomas Elsebutangen
29	MF	NOR	Magnus Retsius Grødem
30	GK	NOR	Aslak Falch
33	DF	NOR	Anders Nedrebø
34	GK	NOR	Adrian Møller
38	DF	NOR	Kristoffer Hay
39	MF	GHA	Ernest Agyiri (on loan from Manchester City)
40	DF	NOR	Mats Andersen
41	DF	NOR	David Gyedu-Nkuahn
42	DF	NOR	Henning Tønsberg Andresen
43	DF	NOR	Madhusan Sandrakumar
44	GK	NOR	Tinius Klausen
—	MF	ISL	Samúel Friðjónsson

=== Out on loan ===
Note: Flags indicate national team as defined under FIFA eligibility rules; some limited exceptions apply. Players may hold more than one non-FIFA nationality.

No.	Pos.	Nation	Player
22	FW	ISL	Elías Már Ómarsson (at IFK Göteborg)

== Transfers ==
=== Winter ===
In: Note: Flags indicate national team as defined under FIFA eligibility rules; some limited exceptions apply. Players may hold more than one non-FIFA nationality.

No.	Pos.	Nation	Player
1	GK	SWE	Marcus Sandberg (from (Sweden) Göteborg)
2	DF	NOR	Niklas Gunnarsson (loan return from (Sweden) Elfsborg)
3	DF	EST	Enar Jääger (from (Estonia) Flora Tallinn, previously on loan)
8	DF	SWE	Jesper Arvidsson (from (Sweden) Djurgården)
16	MF	NOR	Vajebah Sakor (on loan from (Italy) Juventus)
17	FW	NOR	Niklas Castro (Promoted)
18	MF	NOR	Rino Falk Larsen (Promoted)
21	MF	NOR	Simen Juklerød (from (Norway) Bærum)
30	GK	NOR	Aslak Falch (free agent)
33	DF	NOR	Anders Nedrebø (from (Norway) Bærum)
—	MF	NOR	Brede Sandmoen (from (Norway) Holmen)

Out: Note: Flags indicate national team as defined under FIFA eligibility rules; some limited exceptions apply. Players may hold more than one non-FIFA nationality.

No.	Pos.	Nation	Player
1	GK	CAN	Lars Hirschfeld (to (Norway) KFUM Oslo)
2	DF	NOR	Niklas Gunnarsson (on loan to (Scotland) Hibernian, previously on loan at (Sweden) Elfsborg)
8	MF	SWE	Melker Hallberg (loan return to (Italy) Udinese, later loaned to (Sweden) Hammarby)
11	MF	NOR	Morten Berre (retired)
15	DF	NOR	Markus Nakkim (on loan to (Norway) Strømmen)
17	FW	NOR	Daniel Braaten (to (Norway) Brann)
21	MF	NOR	Alexander Mathisen (to (Norway) Nordstrand)
28	FW	NOR	Riki Alba (on loan to (Sweden) Varbergs BoIS, previously on loan at (Norway) Bærum)
30	GK	AUT	Michael Langer (to (United States) Tampa Bay Rowdies)
37	DF	NOR	Ivan Näsberg (on loan to (Sweden) Varbergs BoIS)
38	GK	GER	Sascha Burchert (loan return to (Germany) Hertha Berlin)

=== Summer ===
In: Note: Flags indicate national team as defined under FIFA eligibility rules; some limited exceptions apply. Players may hold more than one non-FIFA nationality.

No.	Pos.	Nation	Player
8	MF	NOR	Magnus Lekven (from (Denmark) Esbjerg)
15	DF	NOR	Markus Nakkim (loan return from (Norway) Strømmen)
20	FW	NOR	Henrik Kjelsrud Johansen (from (Norway) Odd)
28	FW	NOR	Thomas Elsebutangen (from (Norway) Pors Grenland)
29	MF	NOR	Magnus Grødem (from (Norway) Bryne)
38	DF	NOR	Kristoffer Hay (from (Norway) Hønefoss)
39	MF	GHA	Ernest Agyiri (on loan from (England) Manchester City)
—	MF	ISL	Samúel Friðjónsson (from (England) Reading)

Out: Note: Flags indicate national team as defined under FIFA eligibility rules; some limited exceptions apply. Players may hold more than one non-FIFA nationality.

No.	Pos.	Nation	Player
2	DF	NOR	Niklas Gunnarsson (to (Sweden) Djurgården, previously on loan at (Scotland) Hibernian)
8	DF	SWE	Jesper Arvidsson (to (Sweden) IK Sirius)
22	FW	ISL	Elías Már Ómarsson (loan to (Sweden) IFK Göteborg)
26	FW	JAM	Deshorn Brown (to (China) Shenzhen)
—	FW	NOR	Riki Alba (on loan to (Norway) Ull/Kisa, previously on loan at (Sweden) Varbergs BoIS)

== Competitions ==
=== Tippeligaen ===
==== Results summary ====
Overall								Home						Away					
Pld	W	D	L	GF	GA	GD	Pts	W	D	L	GF	GA	GD	W	D	L	GF	GA	GD
30	10	8	12	40	38	+2	38	5	5	5	19	13	+6	5	3	7	21	25	−4

Last updated: 9 November 2016.
Source: see below

==== Results by round ====
Round	1	2	3	4	5	6	7	8	9	10	11	12	13	14	15	16	17	18	19	20	21	22	23	24	25	26	27	28	29	30
Ground	H	A	H	A	H	A	H	A	H	A	H	A	A	H	A	H	A	H	A	H	H	A	H	A	H	A	H	A	H	A
Result	L	L	L	L	W	L	W	L	W	D	L	L	D	L	L	D	W	W	W	W	D	W	D	D	L	L	D	W	D	W
Position	16	16	16	16	13	15	13	14	11	11	12	14	13	14	15	15	13	13	10	10	10	9	9	10	10	11	11	11	11	10

Updated to match(es) played on 9 November 2016. Source: see below
A = Away; H = Home; W = Win; D = Draw; L = Loss

==== Results ====
14 March 2016 1	Vålerenga	0–2	Viking	Oslo
19:00 CET (UTC+1)	Stengel (yellow card) 60'; Wæhler (yellow card) 78'	Summary	Soares (yellow card) 17'; Sverrisson 22' (yellow card) 87'; Haugen (yellow card) 66'; Bringaker 88'	Stadium: Ullevaal Stadion; Attendance: 7,573; Referee: Kim Andre Johnsen

20 March 2016 2	Sogndal	1–0	Vålerenga	Sogndalsfjøra
15:30 CET (UTC+1)	Ramsland 12'	Summary		Stadium: Fosshaugane Campus; Attendance: 3,453; Referee: Kai Erik Steen

2 April 2016 3	Vålerenga	0–2	Rosenborg	Oslo
18:00 CEST (UTC+2)		Summary	Konradsen (yellow card) 35' de Lanlay 83'; Jensen 87'	Stadium: Ullevaal Stadion; Attendance: 15,146; Referee: Svein Oddvar Moen

9 April 2016 4	Stabæk	2–1	Vålerenga	Bærum
18:00 CEST (UTC+2)	Kassi 1'; Mehmeti (yellow card) 26'; Issah (yellow card) 80'; Gorozia 90'	Summary	Larsen (yellow card) 12'; Brown 68'; Zahid (yellow card) 89'	Stadium: Nadderud Stadion; Attendance: 4,151; Referee: Svein-Erik Edvartsen

17 April 2016 5	Vålerenga	4–0	Tromsø	Oslo
18:00 CEST (UTC+2)	Brown 41'; Wæhler (yellow card) 56'; Holm 61' (pen.); Zahid 65'; Lindkvist 70'; Jääger (yellow card) 73'	Summary	Pedersen (yellow card) 3'; Olsen (yellow card) 25'; Antonsen (yellow card) 64'	Stadium: Ullevaal Stadion; Attendance: 7,047; Referee: Tom Harald Hagen

21 April 2016 6	Molde	4–0	Vålerenga	Molde
19:00 CEST (UTC+2)	Svendsen 15'; Bakenga 34'; Ssewankambo (yellow card) 45'; Strand 64'; Toivio 88'	Summary	Sakor (yellow card) 10'; Wæhler (yellow card) 29'; Larsen (yellow card) 90+1'	Stadium: Aker Stadion; Attendance: 7,775; Referee: Tommy Skjerven

24 April 2016 7	Vålerenga	2–0	Start	Oslo
20:00 CEST (UTC+2)	Brown 6', 89'; Castro (yellow card) 32'	Summary		Stadium: Ullevaal Stadion; Attendance: 6,379; Referee: Svein Oddvar Moen

30 April 2016 8	Lillestrøm	2–0	Vålerenga	Lillestrøm
15:30 CET (UTC+1)	Friday 9'; Jradi 30'; Innocent (yellow card) 90+2'	Summary	Zahid (yellow card) 88'; Wæhler (yellow card) 90+5'	Stadium: Åråsen Stadion; Attendance: 9,085; Referee: Svein-Erik Edvartsen

8 May 2016 9	Vålerenga	3–0	Sarpsborg 08	Oslo
18:00 CET (UTC+1)	Jääger 21'; Brown 52'; Ómarsson 88'	Summary		Stadium: Ullevaal Stadion; Attendance: 6,916; Referee: Tore Hansen

11 May 2016 10	Bodø/Glimt	0–0	Vålerenga	Bodø
19:00 CEST (UTC+2)	Normann (yellow card) 29'	Summary	Larsen (yellow card) 69'	Stadium: Aspmyra Stadion; Attendance: 2,898; Referee: Tommy Skjerven

16 May 2016 11	Vålerenga	0–1	Haugesund	Oslo
18:00 CEST (UTC+2)	Zahid (yellow card) 65'; Wæhler (yellow card) 67'; Jääger (yellow card) 69'	Summary	Ibrahim 18'; Stølås (yellow card) 60'; Skjerve (yellow card) 80'	Stadium: Ullevaal Stadion; Attendance: 9,164; Referee: Kim Andre Johnsen

22 May 2016 12	Strømsgodset	3–2	Vålerenga	Drammen
18:00 CEST (UTC+2)	Keita 58'; Moen (yellow card) 60' (goal) 85'; Vilsvik 71'	Summary	Brown 20'; Arvidsson (yellow card) 27'; Abu 28' (o.g.); Lindkvist (yellow card) 65'; Falch (yellow card) 65'	Stadium: Marienlyst Stadion; Attendance: 7,258; Referee: Svein Oddvar Moen

29 May 2016 13	Aalesund	2–2	Vålerenga	Ålesund
20:00 CEST (UTC+2)	Gyasi 12' 82'	Summary	Berge (yellow card) 38'; Ómarsson 71'; Wæhler 88'	Stadium: Color Line Stadion; Attendance: 6,121; Referee: Tom Harald Hagen

3 July 2016 14	Vålerenga	0–1	Odd	Oslo
15:30 CEST (UTC+2)		Summary	Zekhnini 41'	Stadium: Ullevaal Stadion; Attendance: 7,667; Referee: Tore Hansen

9 July 2016 15	Brann	4–1	Vålerenga	Bergen
18:00 CEST (UTC+2)	Barmen 40'; Vega 52'; Skålevik 82'; Huseklepp 85'	Summary	Tollås (yellow card) 17'; Moa 20'	Stadium: Brann Stadion; Attendance: 10,482; Referee: Tom Harald Hagen

15 July 2016 16	Vålerenga	1–1	Sogndal	Oslo
19:00 CEST (UTC+2)	Zahid 17'; Tollås (yellow card) 30'; Larsen (yellow card) 65'	Summary	Sveen 69'	Stadium: Ullevaal Stadion; Attendance: 7,074; Referee: Kim Andre Johnsen

24 July 2016 17	Start	2–4	Vålerenga	Kristiansand
15:30 CEST (UTC+2)	Børufsen 78', 84'	Summary	Moa (yellow card) 11'; Tollås 23'; Zahid 53'; Grindheim 81'; Johansen 88'	Stadium: Sør Arena; Attendance: 5,022; Referee: Svein Oddvar Moen

1 August 2016 18	Vålerenga	3–0	Molde	Oslo
19:00 CEST (UTC+2)	Moa 9'; Larsen 16'; Sakor (yellow card) 30'; Zahid 76'	Summary		Stadium: Ullevaal Stadion; Attendance: 10,304; Referee: Svein-Erik Edvartsen

7 August 2016 19	Sarpsborg 08	0–2	Vålerenga	Sarpsborg
18:00 CEST (UTC+2)	Trondsen (yellow card) 64'	Summary	Lindkvist 22'; Wæhler (yellow card) 39'; Moa 79'	Stadium: Sarpsborg Stadion; Attendance: 5,107; Referee: Tommy Skjerven

13 August 2016 20	Vålerenga	3–2	Brann	Oslo
18:00 CEST (UTC+2)	Zahid 31', 90+2'; Juklerød 45+1'; Grindheim (yellow card) 73'; Holm (yellow card) 82'	Summary	Barmen 14'; Vega (yellow card) 49'; Nilsen 55'; Acosta (yellow card) 71'	Stadium: Ullevaal Stadion; Attendance: 9,866; Referee: Svein Oddvar Moen

19 August 2016 21	Vålerenga	1–1	Bodø/Glimt	Oslo
19:00 CEST (UTC+2)	Wæhler (yellow card) 25'; Larsen (yellow card) 59'; Juklerød 65'	Summary	Azemi 43'; Jacobsen (yellow card) 56'; Pohorilyy (yellow card) 89'; Mockenhaupt (yellow card) 90'	Stadium: Ullevaal Stadion; Attendance: 7,447; Referee: Tommy Skjerven

28 August 2016 22	Odd	1–2	Vålerenga	Skien
20:00 CEST (UTC+2)	Ruud 46'; Occéan (yellow card) 85'	Summary	Lekven (yellow card) 10'; Moa (yellow card) 35' (goal) 45+1', 64'	Stadium: Skagerak Arena; Attendance: 9,135; Referee: Svein-Erik Edvartsen

10 September 2016 23	Vålerenga	1–1	Strømsgodset	Oslo
15:30 CEST (UTC+2)	Juklerød 58'; Lundström (yellow card) 73'	Summary	Andersen 51'	Stadium: Ullevaal Stadion; Attendance: 8,422; Referee: Svein Oddvar Moen

16 September 2016 24	Haugesund	1–1	Vålerenga	Haugesund
19:00 CEST (UTC+2)	Stølås 31'	Summary	Nakkim (yellow card) 57'; Zahid 75' (yellow card) 78'	Stadium: Haugesund Stadion; Attendance: 5,330; Referee: Tommy Skjerven

25 September 2016 25	Vålerenga	0–1	Aalesund	Oslo
18:00 CEST (UTC+2)	Lindkvist (yellow card) 32'; Lundström (yellow card) 42'; Wæhler (yellow card) 45+2'	Summary	Abdellaoue 1'; Hoff (yellow card) 30'; Carlsen (yellow card) 34'; Kirkeskov (yellow card) 71'; A.Lie (yellow card) 88'	Stadium: Ullevaal Stadion; Attendance: 6,845; Referee: Kim Andre Johnsen

2 October 2016 26	Rosenborg	3–1	Vålerenga	Trondheim
18:00 CEST (UTC+2)	Reitan 4'; Helland 29'; Bakenga 31'; Þórarinsson (yellow card) 44'	Summary	Reginiussen 38' (o.g.); Moa (yellow card) 44'	Stadium: Lerkendal Stadion; Attendance: 19,518; Referee: Svein Oddvar Moen

16 October 2016 27	Vålerenga	1–1	Stabæk	Oslo
20:00 CEST (UTC+2)	Lekven (yellow card) 53'; Lindkvist 84'	Summary	Keita 3' (pen.)	Stadium: Ullevaal Stadion; Attendance: 7,088; Referee: Svein Oddvar Moen

23 October 2016 28	Tromsø	0–3	Vålerenga	Tromsø
15:30 CEST (UTC+2)		Summary	Johansen 49'; Moa 58'; Zahid 66'; Wæhler (yellow card) 80'; Larsen (yellow card) 84'	Stadium: Alfheim Stadion; Attendance: 6,429; Referee: Tom Harald Hagen

30 October 2016 29	Vålerenga	1–1	Lillestrøm	Oslo
18:00 CET (UTC+1)	Moa (yellow card) 21'; Larsen (yellow card) 64'; Sakor 80'; Stengel (yellow card) 89'	Summary	Innocent (yellow card) 20'; Kippe (yellow card) 20'; Martin 32'; Mathew (yellow card) 51'	Stadium: Ullevaal Stadion; Attendance: 19,038; Referee: Dag Vidar Hafsås

6 November 2016 30	Viking	0–2	Vålerenga	Stavanger
18:00 CET (UTC+1)	Jørgensen (yellow card) 76'; Mets (yellow card) 80'; Bringaker (yellow card) 90+4'	Summary	Moa 43'; Wæhler (yellow card) 66'; Grødem 90'; Sandberg (yellow card) 90+4'	Stadium: Viking Stadion; Attendance: 11,347; Referee: Tore Hansen

==== Table ====
Pos	Team	Pld	W	D	L	GF	GA	GD	Pts
8	Viking	30	12	7	11	33	35	−2	43
9	Aalesund	30	12	6	12	46	51	−5	42
10	Vålerenga	30	10	8	12	41	39	+2	38
11	Sogndal	30	8	12	10	33	37	−4	36
12	Lillestrøm	30	8	10	12	45	50	−5	34

Source: Football Association of Norway (in Norwegian), Soccerway
Rules for classification: 1) Points; 2) Goal difference; 3) Goals scored; 4) Head-to-head points; 5) Head-to-head goal difference; 6) Head-to-head away goals scored (between two teams).

=== Norwegian Cup ===
13 April 2016 First Round	Løten	1–4	Vålerenga	Løten
18:00 CEST (UTC+2)	Mellum 2'	Report	Ómarsson 11', 21'; Nedrebø (yellow card) 32'; Castro 50'; Udahl 67'	Stadium: Løten Stadion; Attendance: 2,813; Referee: Henrik Ingwardo

27 April 2016 Second Round	Hønefoss	1–3	Vålerenga	Hønefoss
18:00 CEST (UTC+2)	Muqkurtaj 58'	Report	Zahid 15'; Brown 21'; Stengel (yellow card) 57'; Sakor 83'	Stadium: Aka Arena; Attendance: 1,519; Referee: Nedim Brbovic

4 May 2016 Third Round	KFUM Oslo	0–2	Vålerenga	Oslo
19:00 CEST (UTC+2)	R.Rasch (yellow card) 58'; Ekblom (yellow card) 75'; C.Abshir (yellow card) 88'	Report	Arvidsson (yellow card) 33'; Brown 71', 80'	Stadium: KFUM-Arena; Attendance: 1,800; Referee: Sigurd Kringstadbukta

25 May 2016 Fourth Round	Vålerenga	3–1	Vidar	Oslo
18:00 CEST (UTC+2)	Sakor 20'; Brown 84'; Juklerød (yellow card) 88' (goal) 90+3'	Report	Bjørshol (yellow card) 24'; Christensen 56'; A.Westly (yellow card) 65'	Stadium: Ullevaal Stadion; Attendance: 1,496; Referee: Sigurd Kringstadbukta

22 September 2016 Quarterfinal	Strømsgodset	2–0	Vålerenga	Drammen
20:00 CEST (UTC+2)	Nakkim 45' (o.g.); Pedersen 50' (pen.); Høiland (yellow card) 85'	Summary	Larsen (yellow card) 45'; Lundström (yellow card) 50'	Stadium: Marienlyst Stadion; Attendance: 5,018; Referee: Tore Hansen

== Squad statistics ==
As of match played 6 November 2016

=== Appearances and goals ===
No.	Pos	Nat	Player	Total		Tippeligaen		Norwegian Cup	
No.	Pos	Nat	Player	Apps	Goals	Apps	Goals	Apps	Goals
1	GK	(Sweden) SWE	Marcus Sandberg	18	0	17	0	1	0
3	DF	(Estonia) EST	Enar Jääger	14	1	11	1	3	0
4	DF	(Norway) NOR	Jonatan Tollås	12	1	11	1	1	0
5	DF	(Sweden) SWE	Robert Lundström	22	0	16+4	0	2	0
6	DF	(Norway) NOR	Simon Larsen	31	1	26	1	5	0
7	MF	(Norway) NOR	Daniel Fredheim Holm	22	1	13+7	1	1+1	0
8	MF	(Norway) NOR	Magnus Lekven	10	0	6+4	0	0	0
9	MF	(Sweden) SWE	Rasmus Lindkvist	30	3	25+2	3	3	0
10	MF	(Norway) NOR	Ghayas Zahid	32	9	28	8	4	1
14	MF	(Norway) NOR	Herman Stengel	29	0	11+14	0	4	0
15	DF	(Norway) NOR	Markus Nakkim	7	0	6	0	1	0
16	MF	(Norway) NOR	Vajebah Sakor	26	3	13+8	1	2+3	2
17	FW	(Norway) NOR	Niklas Castro	13	1	4+5	0	1+3	1
18	MF	(Norway) NOR	Rino Falk Larsen	3	0	0+3	0	0	0
19	MF	(Norway) NOR	Christian Grindheim	31	1	26+2	1	3	0
20	FW	(Norway) NOR	Henrik Kjelsrud Johansen	15	2	5+9	2	0+1	0
21	MF	(Norway) NOR	Simen Juklerød	24	4	17+3	3	3+1	1
23	MF	(Norway) NOR	Sander Berge	30	0	23+2	0	4+1	0
24	DF	(Norway) NOR	Kjetil Wæhler	23	1	21	1	2	0
25	FW	(Norway) NOR	Mohammed Abdellaoue	19	7	15+3	7	1	0
28	FW	(Norway) NOR	Thomas Elsebutangen	2	0	0+2	0	0	0
29	MF	(Norway) NOR	Magnus Grødem	1	1	1	1	0	0
30	GK	(Norway) NOR	Aslak Falch	17	0	13	0	4	0
33	DF	(Norway) NOR	Anders Nedrebø	7	0	1+4	0	2	0
39	MF	(Ghana) GHA	Ernest Agyiri	2	0	1	0	0+1	0
40	DF	(Norway) NOR	Mathusan Sandrakumar	1	0	0	0	0+1	0
41	DF	(Norway) NOR	Sander Pettersen	1	0	0	0	0+1	0
43	FW	(Norway) NOR	Henrik Udahl	2	1	0+1	0	0+1	1
Players away from Vålerenga on loan:
22	FW	(Iceland) ISL	Elías Már Ómarsson	16	4	5+8	2	3	2
Players who left Vålerenga during the season:
8	DF	(Sweden) SWE	Jesper Arvidsson	8	0	5+1	0	2	0
26	FW	(Jamaica) JAM	Deshorn Brown	17	10	13+1	6	3	4

=== Goal scorers ===
Place	Position	Nation	Number	Name	Tippeligaen	Norwegian Cup	Total
1	FW	(Jamaica)	26	Deshorn Brown	6	4	10
2	MF	(Norway)	10	Ghayas Zahid	8	1	9
3	FW	(Norway)	25	Mohammed Abdellaoue	7	0	7
4	MF	(Norway)	21	Simen Juklerød	3	1	4
4	FW	(Iceland)	22	Elías Már Ómarsson	2	2	4
6	MF	(Sweden)	9	Rasmus Lindkvist	3	0	3
6	MF	(Norway)	16	Vajebah Sakor	1	2	3
8	FW	(Norway)	20	Henrik Kjelsrud Johansen	2	0	2
8				Own goal	2	0	2
10	MF	(Norway)	7	Daniel Fredheim Holm	1	0	1
10	DF	(Estonia)	3	Enar Jääger	1	0	1
10	DF	(Norway)	24	Kjetil Wæhler	1	0	1
10	DF	(Norway)	4	Jonatan Tollås	1	0	1
10	MF	(Norway)	19	Christian Grindheim	1	0	1
10	DF	(Norway)	6	Simon Larsen	1	0	1
10	MF	(Norway)	29	Magnus Grødem	1	0	1
10	FW	(Norway)	17	Niklas Castro	0	1	1
10	FW	(Norway)	43	Henrik Udahl	0	1	1
				TOTALS	41	12	53

=== Disciplinary record ===
Number	Nation	Position	Name	Tippeligaen		Norwegian Cup		Total	
Number	Nation	Position	Name	Yellow card	Red card	Yellow card	Red card	Yellow card	Red card
1	(Sweden)	GK	Marcus Sandberg	1	0	0	0	1	0
3	(Estonia)	DF	Enar Jääger	2	0	0	0	2	0
4	(Norway)	DF	Jonatan Tollås	2	0	0	0	2	0
5	(Norway)	DF	Robert Lundström	3	0	1	0	4	0
6	(Norway)	DF	Simon Larsen	7	0	1	0	8	0
7	(Norway)	MF	Daniel Fredheim Holm	1	0	0	0	1	0
8	(Sweden)	DF	Jesper Arvidsson	0	0	1	0	1	0
8	(Norway)	MF	Magnus Lekven	2	0	0	0	2	0
9	(Sweden)	MF	Rasmus Lindkvist	2	0	0	0	2	0
10	(Norway)	MF	Ghayas Zahid	4	0	0	0	4	0
14	(Norway)	MF	Herman Stengel	2	0	1	0	3	0
15	(Norway)	DF	Markus Nakkim	1	0	0	0	1	0
16	(Norway)	MF	Vajebah Sakor	2	0	0	0	2	0
17	(Norway)	FW	Niklas Castro	1	0	0	0	1	0
19	(Norway)	MF	Christian Grindheim	1	0	0	0	1	0
21	(Norway)	MF	Simen Juklerød	0	0	1	0	1	0
23	(Norway)	MF	Sander Berge	1	0	0	0	1	0
24	(Norway)	DF	Kjetil Wæhler	10	0	0	0	10	0
25	(Norway)	FW	Mohammed Abdellaoue	4	0	0	0	4	0
30	(Norway)	GK	Aslak Falch	1	0	0	0	1	0
33	(Norway)	DF	Anders Nedrebø	0	0	1	0	1	0
			TOTALS	47	0	6	0	53	0
