= 2017 Vålerenga Fotball season =

Vålerenga
2017 season
- Chairman: Thomas Baardseng
- Manager: Ronny Deila
- Stadium: Ullevaal Stadion
- Eliteserien: 8th
- Norwegian Cup: Semifinal vs Sarpsborg 08
- Top goalscorer: League: Herman Stengel (6); All: Ghayas Zahid (8)
Home colours	Away colours	Third colours

Vålerenga Fotball is a Norwegian association football club from Oslo. They play their home games at Ullevaal Stadion which has a capacity of 28,972. During the 2017 campaign, they competed in Eliteserien and the Norwegian Cup.

== Season events ==
On 1 January, Ronny Deila took over as manager from Kjetil Rekdal having signed a contract with the club on 13 July 2016.

== Squad ==
As of 9 August 2017

Note: Flags indicate national team as defined under FIFA eligibility rules; some limited exceptions apply. Players may hold more than one non-FIFA nationality.

No.	Pos.	Nation	Player
1	GK	SWE	Marcus Sandberg
2	DF	NOR	Markus Nakkim
3	DF	EST	Enar Jääger
4	DF	NOR	Jonatan Tollås
5	DF	SWE	Robert Lundström
6	MF	NOR	Abdisalam Ibrahim
7	FW	NOR	Daniel Fredheim Holm
8	MF	NOR	Magnus Lekven
9	FW	NOR	Fitim Azemi
10	MF	NOR	Ghayas Zahid
11	FW	NOR	Bård Finne
13	GK	NOR	Kristoffer Klaesson
14	MF	NOR	Herman Stengel
15	MF	NOR	Daniel Berntsen
18	DF	NOR	Christian Borchgrevink
19	MF	NOR	Christian Grindheim (Captain)
20	FW	NOR	Henrik Kjelsrud Johansen

No.	Pos.	Nation	Player
21	MF	NOR	Simen Juklerød
22	DF	NOR	Ivan Näsberg
23	MF	NOR	Felix Myhre
25	FW	NOR	Mohammed Abdellaoue
26	MF	NOR	Aron Dønnum
27	MF	ISL	Samúel Friðjónsson
28	FW	NOR	Thomas Elsebutangen
33	GK	GHA	Adam Larsen Kwarasey
38	DF	NOR	Kristoffer Hay
39	MF	GHA	Ernest Agyiri (on loan from Manchester City)
40	FW	NGR	Chidera Ejuke
50	GK	NOR	Stian Tinius Klausen
51	DF	NOR	Aslak Oberg
52	MF	NOR	Didrik Støer Hagen
53	MF	NOR	Lars Olden Larsen
54	FW	NOR	Oliver Valaker Edvardsen

=== Out on loan ===
Note: Flags indicate national team as defined under FIFA eligibility rules; some limited exceptions apply. Players may hold more than one non-FIFA nationality.

No.	Pos.	Nation	Player
29	MF	NOR	Magnus Grødem (at Ull/Kisa)
31	DF	NOR	Madhusan Sandrakumar (at Strømmen)

== Transfers ==
=== Winter ===
In: Note: Flags indicate national team as defined under FIFA eligibility rules; some limited exceptions apply. Players may hold more than one non-FIFA nationality.

No.	Pos.	Nation	Player
11	FW	NOR	Bård Finne (from (Germany) Heidenheim)
15	MF	NOR	Daniel Berntsen (from (Sweden) Djurgården)
17	FW	NOR	Muhamed Keita (loan from (Poland) Lech Poznań)
37	DF	NOR	Ivan Näsberg (loan return from (Sweden) Varbergs BoIS)
40	FW	NGR	Chidera Ejuke (from (Nigeria) Gombe United)

Out: Note: Flags indicate national team as defined under FIFA eligibility rules; some limited exceptions apply. Players may hold more than one non-FIFA nationality.

No.	Pos.	Nation	Player
6	DF	NOR	Simon Larsen (to (Norway) Start)
16	MF	NOR	Vajebah Sakor (loan return to (Italy) Juventus)
17	MF	NOR	Niklas Castro (to (Norway) Kongsvinger)
18	MF	NOR	Rino Falk Larsen (to (Norway) Fredrikstad)
22	FW	ISL	Elías Már Ómarsson (to (Sweden) Göteborg, previously on loan)
23	MF	NOR	Sander Berge (to (Belgium) Genk)
24	DF	NOR	Kjetil Wæhler (retired)
33	DF	NOR	Anders Nedrebø (released)
40	DF	NOR	Mats Andersen (to (Norway) Skeid)
42	DF	NOR	Henrik Tønsberg Andersen (to (Norway) Skeid)
—	FW	NOR	Riki Alba (to (Norway) Asker, previously on loan at (Norway) Ull/Kisa)

=== Summer ===
In: Note: Flags indicate national team as defined under FIFA eligibility rules; some limited exceptions apply. Players may hold more than one non-FIFA nationality.

No.	Pos.	Nation	Player
9	FW	NOR	Fitim Azemi (from (Israel) Maccabi Haifa)
33	GK	GHA	Adam Larsen Kwarasey (from (Denmark) Brøndby)

Out: Note: Flags indicate national team as defined under FIFA eligibility rules; some limited exceptions apply. Players may hold more than one non-FIFA nationality.

No.	Pos.	Nation	Player
9	MF	SWE	Rasmus Lindkvist (to (Sweden) AIK)
17	FW	NOR	Muhamed Keita (loan return to (Poland) Lech Poznań)
29	MF	NOR	Magnus Grødem (on loan to (Norway) Ull/Kisa)
30	GK	NOR	Aslak Falch (to (Sweden) Norrköping)
31	DF	NOR	Mathusan Sandrakumar (on loan to (Norway) Strømmen)

== Competitions ==
=== Eliteserien ===
==== Results summary ====
Overall								Home						Away					
Pld	W	D	L	GF	GA	GD	Pts	W	D	L	GF	GA	GD	W	D	L	GF	GA	GD
30	11	6	13	48	46	+2	39	8	4	3	26	12	+14	3	2	10	22	34	−12

Last updated: 26 November 2017.
Source: see below

==== Results by round ====
Round	1	2	3	4	5	6	7	8	9	10	11	12	13	14	15	16	17	18	19	20	21	22	23	24	25	26	27	28	29	30
Ground	H	A	H	A	H	A	H	A	H	A	H	A	H	H	A	A	A	H	A	H	A	H	A	H	H	A	H	A	H	A
Result	W	L	L	L	W	L	D	W	W	L	D	W	D	W	D	D	L	D	L	L	L	W	L	W	W	L	W	L	W	L
Position	7	7	9	15	9	12	12	10	7	9	8	8	7	6	6	7	11	11	12	12	12	11	12	10	8	8	8	9	6	8

Updated to match(es) played on 26 November 2017. Source: see below
A = Away; H = Home; W = Win; D = Draw; L = Loss

==== Results ====
3 April 2017 1	Vålerenga	1–0	Viking	Oslo
19:00 CEST (UTC+2)	Finne 53'	Report		Stadium: Ullevaal Stadion; Attendance: 8,559; Referee: Dag Vidar Hafsås

6 April 2017 2	Haugesund	4–3	Vålerenga	Haugesund
19:00 CEST (UTC+2)	Gytkjær 15', 90' (yellow card) 32'; Ibrahim 36', 47'	Report	Skjerve 38' (o.g.); Lundström (yellow card) 40'; Keita 70'; Juklerød (yellow card) 78'; Grødem 80'	Stadium: Haugesund Stadion; Attendance: 4,421; Referee: Tore Hansen

9 April 2017 3	Vålerenga	1–2	Sandefjord	Oslo
18:00 CEST (UTC+2)	Tollås (yellow card) 37' (yellow-red card) 63' (goal) 49'	Report	Kane (yellow card) 35'; Kastrati 37' (pen.), 73' (yellow card) 38'; Kurtovic (yellow card) 39'; Jónsson (yellow card) 50'	Stadium: Ullevaal Stadion; Attendance: 6,778; Referee: Rohit Saggi

17 April 2017 4	Molde	4–0	Vålerenga	Molde
18:00 CEST (UTC+2)	S.Svendsen 7', 28'; Näsberg 11'; Sigurðarson 46'	Report	Näsberg (yellow card) 63'; Berntsen (yellow card) 84'	Stadium: Aker Stadion; Attendance: 7,226; Referee: Dag Vidar Hafsås

23 April 2017 5	Vålerenga	3–0	Sogndal	Oslo
18:00 CEST (UTC+2)	Grindheim 41' (yellow card) 68'; Tollås 44'; Finne 89'	Report	Birkelund (yellow card) 38'; Skaasheim (yellow card) 49'; Nwakali (yellow card) 55'	Stadium: Ullevaal Stadion; Attendance: 5,844; Referee: Svein Oddvar Moen

30 April 2017 6	Odd	2–1	Vålerenga	Skien
20:00 CEST (UTC+2)	Diouf 32' (yellow card) 82'; Nordkvelle 42'	Report	Berntsen (yellow card) 61'; Zahid (yellow card) 69'	Stadium: Skagerak Arena; Attendance: 7,673; Referee: Tom Harald Hagen

7 May 2017 7	Vålerenga	1–1	Stabæk	Oslo
18:00 CEST (UTC+2)	Finne (yellow card) 33'; Tollås (yellow card) 57'; Zahid 89' (pen.) (yellow card) 90+2'	Report	Brochmann 45+1'; Moe (yellow card) 61'; Vetlesen (yellow card) 63'; Mande (yellow card) 88'; Nimely (yellow card) 90+3'	Stadium: Ullevaal Stadion; Attendance: 6,968; Referee: Kai Erik Steen

12 May 2017 8	Aalesund	0–1	Vålerenga	Ålesund
19:00 CEST (UTC+2)	Ramsteijn (yellow card) 78'	Report	Stengel 39' (yellow card) 60'; Lekven (yellow card) 41'; Näsberg (yellow card) 66'	Stadium: Color Line Stadion; Referee: Dag Vidar Hafsås

16 May 2017 9	Vålerenga	1–0	Kristiansund	Oslo
18:00 CEST (UTC+2)	Lundström 53'; Zahid (yellow card) 70'	Report	Bamba (yellow card) 55'; Baranov (yellow card) 85'; Qaka (yellow card) 90'	Stadium: Ullevaal Stadion; Attendance: 7,226; Referee: Tore Hansen

21 May 2017 10	Sarpsborg 08	2–0	Vålerenga	Sarpsborg
18:00 CEST (UTC+2)	Rosted 4'; Thomassen (yellow card) 31'; Trondsen 38'; Halvorsen (yellow card) 50'	Report	Lundström (yellow card) 30'; Ibrahim (yellow card) 32'	Stadium: Sarpsborg Stadion; Attendance: 5,301; Referee: Kristoffer Hagenes

28 May 2017 11	Vålerenga	1–1	Rosenborg	Oslo
20:00 CEST (UTC+2)	Grindheim (yellow card) 65'; Stengel 84'; Sandberg (yellow card) 86'	Report	Lundemo (yellow card) 38'; Jevtović 45'; Meling (yellow card) 62'; Bendtner (yellow card) 86'; Jensen (yellow card) 90'	Stadium: Ullevaal Stadion; Attendance: 13,827; Referee: Kai Erik Steen

3 June 2017 12	Tromsø	2–4	Vålerenga	Tromsø
15:30 CEST (UTC+2)	Sigurðarson 62'; Ingebrigtsen 75'; Jenssen (yellow card) 83'	Report	Tollås 7'; Zahid 16' (yellow card) 87'; Finne 18'; Abdellaoue 25'; Lundström (yellow card) 34'; Lekven (yellow card) 52'	Stadium: Alfheim Stadion; Attendance: 3,539; Referee: Tom Harald Hagen

18 June 2017 13	Vålerenga	1–1	Strømsgodset	Oslo
20:00 CEST (UTC+2)	Jääger 18'	Report	Parr 2' (yellow card) 78'; Madsen (yellow card) 27'	Stadium: Ullevaal Stadion; Attendance: 8,049; Referee: Tore Hansen

24 June 2017 14	Vålerenga	3–1	Lillestrøm	Oslo
18:00 CEST (UTC+2)	Zahid 24'; Abdellaoue 27'; Finne 51'	Report	Krogstad 13'; Innocent (yellow card) 34'; Brenden (yellow card) 90+2'	Stadium: Ullevaal Stadion; Attendance: 11,407; Referee: Svein Oddvar Moen

2 July 2017 15	Brann	0–0	Vålerenga	Bergen
20:00 CEST (UTC+2)	Nilsen (yellow card) 23'	Report	Zahid (yellow card) 89'	Stadium: Brann Stadion; Attendance: 16,136; Referee: Tom Harald Hagen

12 July 2017 16	Vålerenga	–	Haugesund	Oslo
19:00 CEST (UTC+2)				Stadium: Ullevaal Stadion

17 July 2017 17	Kristiansund	1–1	Vålerenga	Kristiansund
19:00 CEST (UTC+2)	Aasbak 28'	Report	Sandberg (yellow card) 27'; Zahid 55'	Stadium: Atlanten Stadion; Attendance: 4,050; Referee: Dag Vidar Hafsås

7 August 2017 18	Strømsgodset	2–0	Vålerenga	Drammen
19:00 CEST (UTC+2)	Pedersen 5'; Jradi 22'; Parr (yellow card) 90+6'	Report	Jääger (yellow card) 37'; Agyiri (yellow card) 81'	Stadium: Marienlyst Stadion; Attendance: 6,836

14 August 2017 19	Vålerenga	0–0	Tromsø	Oslo
19:00 CEST (UTC+2)		Report	Landu Landu (yellow card) 42'	Stadium: Ullevaal Stadion; Attendance: 10,049; Referee: Tom Harald Hagen

19 August 2017 20	Lillestrøm	2–1	Vålerenga	Lillestrøm
18:00 CEST (UTC+2)	Kippe 9'; Mathew 43'; Tagbajumi (yellow card) 67'	Report	Grindheim 29'; Dønnum (yellow card) 90+4'	Stadium: Åråsen Stadion; Attendance: 8,552; Referee: Svein Oddvar Moen

10 September 2017 21	Vålerenga	1–2	Sarpsborg 08	Oslo
18:00 CEST (UTC+2)	Lundström (yellow card) 47'; Lekven 90+2'	Report	Halvorsen 21'; Diatta 57'; Askar (yellow card) 59'	Stadium: Valle Hovin; Attendance: 17,011; Referee: Svein Oddvar Moen

17 September 2017 22	Rosenborg	3–0	Vålerenga	Trondheim
19:00 CEST (UTC+2)	Bendtner 2', 45' (pen.) (yellow card) 38'; Trondsen 69'	Report	Lundström (yellow card) 45'; Ibrahim (yellow card) 72'	Stadium: Lerkendal Stadion; Attendance: 15,271; Referee: Kai Erik Steen

24 September 2017 23	Vålerenga	1–0	Brann	Oslo
20:00 CEST (UTC+2)	Friðjónsson 8' (yellow card) 90'; Ejuke 83'	Report	Barmen (yellow card) 47'; Haugen 52'	Stadium: Valle Hovin; Attendance: 10,051; Referee: Dag Vidar Hafsås

30 September 2017 24	Stabæk	4–2	Vålerenga	Bærum
18:00 CEST (UTC+2)	Omoijuanfo 57', 76' (yellow card) 73'; Lumanza 60'; Hernández (yellow card) 65'; Boli 82'	Report	Grindheim 37', 45'; Lundström (yellow card) 59'; Berntsen (yellow card) 68'	Stadium: Nadderud Stadion; Attendance: 4,043; Referee: Tore Hansen

12 October 2017 16	Vålerenga	3–0	Haugesund	Oslo
19:00 CEST (UTC+2)	Stengel 27' (pen.); Johansen 34' (yellow card) 61'; Juklerød (yellow card) 64' (goal) 85'; Jääger (yellow card) 79'; Myhre (yellow card) 90+3'	Report	Stølås (yellow card) 26'	Stadium: Intility Arena; Attendance: 9,204; Referee: Rohit Saggi

15 October 2017 25	Vålerenga	5–1	Aalesund	Oslo
18:00 CEST (UTC+2)	Näsberg 5'; Ejuke 7', 29'; Tollås (yellow card) 11'; Juklerød 66'; Johansen 70'	Report	Gyasi 22'	Stadium: Intility Arena; Attendance: 8,932; Referee: Tom Harald Hagen

22 October 2017 26	Viking	1–7	Vålerenga	Stavanger
18:00 CEST (UTC+2)	Haugen (yellow card) 64'; Danielsen (yellow card) 70' (yellow-red card) 86'; Nordvik 74'; Jenkins (yellow card) 85'	Report	Stengel 12', 84' (yellow card) 37'; Juklerød 15', 35', 78'; Jääger 28'; Friðjónsson 54'	Stadium: Viking Stadion; Attendance: 7,760; Referee: Tore Hansen

29 October 2017 27	Vålerenga	1–2	Molde	Oslo
20:00 CET (UTC+1)	Stengel 8'; Näsberg (yellow card) 85'	Report	Sigurðarson 38'; Gabrielsen 90+3'	Stadium: Intility Arena; Attendance: 9,402; Referee: Svein Oddvar Moen

3 November 2017 28	Sandefjord	2–0	Vålerenga	Sandefjord
19:00 CEST (UTC+2)	Morer 27' (yellow card) 45'; Storbæk (yellow card) 55'; Sødlund 57'	Report		Stadium: Komplett Arena; Attendance: 4,103; Referee: Tom Harald Hagen

19 November 2017 29	Vålerenga	2–0	Odd	Oslo
18:00 CET (UTC+1)	Ejuke 8'; Lekven 49'; Stengel (yellow card) 89'	Report	J.Kitolano (yellow card) 54'	Stadium: Intility Arena; Attendance: 12,236; Referee: Tore Hansen

26 November 2017 30	Sogndal	5–2	Vålerenga	Sogndalsfjøra
18:00 CET (UTC+1)	Rindarøy 5'; Birkelund 41'; Teniste (yellow card) 60' (goal) 70'; Ramsland 72'; Nwakali 75'	Report	Johansen 24'; Näsberg (yellow card) 27'; Grindheim 68'	Stadium: Fosshaugane Campus; Attendance: 3,585; Referee: Rohit Saggi

==== Table ====
Pos	Team	Pld	W	D	L	GF	GA	GD	Pts
6	Odd	30	12	6	12	27	39	−12	42
7	Kristiansund	30	10	10	10	44	46	−2	40
8	Vålerenga	30	11	6	13	48	46	+2	39
9	Stabæk	30	10	9	11	46	50	−4	39
10	Haugesund	30	11	6	13	35	39	−4	39

Source: Football Association of Norway (in Norwegian), Soccerway
Rules for classification: 1) Points; 2) Goal difference; 3) Goals scored; 4) Head-to-head points; 5) Head-to-head goal difference; 6) Head-to-head away goals scored (only if between two teams); 7) Head-to-head goals scored; 8) Play-off (only used to decide champions or relegation).

=== Norwegian Cup ===
26 April 2017 First Round	Gran	0–8	Vålerenga	Gran
19:15 CEST (UTC+2)	Myrdahl (yellow card) 34'	Report	Ibrahim 17', 43', 64'; Finne 19'; Zahid 30', 67' (pen.); Magnus 61'; Ejuke 90+1' Grodem Magnus	Stadium: Sparebank1banen; Attendance: 3,112; Referee: Sigurd Kringstad

24 May 2017 Second Round	Kråkerøy	2–2 (a.e.t.) (2–3 p)	Vålerenga	Kråkerøy
18:00 CEST (UTC+2)	E.Laabak (yellow card) 44'; Alphonso 46'; S.Laabak (yellow card) 59'; Thorsen 74'; A.Nygaard (yellow card) 79'; A.Syversen (yellow card) 87'; T.Knudsen (yellow card) 87'; J.Hansen (yellow card) 113'	Report	Johansen 28'; Zahid 31' (yellow card) 84'	Stadium: Kråkerøy Stadium; Attendance: 2,162; Referee: Rohit Saggi
	Penalties
	Laabak (penalty scored); Nilsen (penalty missed); Knudsen (penalty scored); Magnussen (penalty missed); Syversen (penalty missed)		(penalty missed) Stengel; (penalty scored) Johansen; (penalty missed) Tollås; (penalty scored) Zahid; (penalty scored) Jääger

31 May 2017 Third Round	Ørn-Horten	0–1	Vålerenga	Horten
18:30 CEST (UTC+2)	A.Hadžić (yellow card) 31'	Report	Stengel 100'; Johansen (yellow card) 120+1'	Stadium: Lystlunden; Attendance: 2,241; Referee: Christian Moen

10 August 2017 Fourth Round	Vålerenga	1–0	Elverum	Oslo
CEST (UTC+2)	Jääger 22'; Holm (yellow card) 25'	Report	P.Nersveen (yellow card) 37'; M.Hagen (yellow card) 71'; E.Persgård (yellow card) 86'	Stadium: Ullevaal Stadion; Attendance: 2,284; Referee: Kristoffer Hagenes

27 August 2017 Quarterfinal	Rosenborg	1–2	Vålerenga	Trondheim
20:15 CEST (UTC+2)	Jevtović 12'	Report	Dønnum 43'; Johansen 74'; Zahid (yellow card) 77'; Juklerød (yellow card) 89'	Stadium: Lerkendal Stadion; Attendance: 9,195; Referee: Tom Harald Hagen

20 September 2017 Semifinal	Vålerenga	0–3	Sarpsborg 08	Oslo
20:15 CEST (UTC+2)	Johansen (yellow card) 82'; Stengel (yellow card) 90+2'	Report	Diatta 25' (yellow card) 29'; Halvorsen 59', 90' (pen.)	Stadium: Valle Hovin; Attendance: 8,302; Referee: Tore Hansen

== Squad statistics ==
As of match played 26 November 2017

=== Appearances and goals ===
No.	Pos	Nat	Player	Total		Eliteserien		Norwegian Cup	
No.	Pos	Nat	Player	Apps	Goals	Apps	Goals	Apps	Goals
1	GK	(Sweden) SWE	Marcus Sandberg	18	0	16	0	2	0
2	DF	(Norway) NOR	Markus Nakkim	10	0	6+2	0	2	0
3	DF	(Estonia) EST	Enar Jääger	32	3	24+3	2	4+1	1
4	DF	(Norway) NOR	Jonatan Tollås	35	3	29	3	5+1	0
5	DF	(Sweden) SWE	Robert Lundström	30	1	26	1	4	0
6	MF	(Norway) NOR	Abdisalam Ibrahim	20	3	9+7	0	3+1	3
7	MF	(Norway) NOR	Daniel Fredheim Holm	13	0	9+1	0	3	0
8	MF	(Norway) NOR	Magnus Lekven	26	2	25+1	2	0	0
9	FW	(Norway) NOR	Fitim Azemi	8	0	0+7	0	0+1	0
10	MF	(Norway) NOR	Ghayas Zahid	22	8	18	5	4	3
11	FW	(Norway) NOR	Bård Finne	27	5	19+5	4	1+2	1
14	MF	(Norway) NOR	Herman Stengel	25	6	13+8	6	3+1	0
15	MF	(Norway) NOR	Daniel Berntsen	24	0	8+10	0	5+1	0
18	DF	(Norway) NOR	Christian Borchgrevink	4	0	1	0	2+1	0
19	MF	(Norway) NOR	Christian Grindheim	27	5	22+1	5	3+1	0
20	FW	(Norway) NOR	Henrik Kjelsrud Johansen	27	5	15+7	3	5	2
21	MF	(Norway) NOR	Simen Juklerød	25	5	20+1	5	4	0
22	DF	(Norway) NOR	Ivan Näsberg	19	1	15	1	3+1	0
23	MF	(Norway) NOR	Felix Myhre	2	0	0+2	0	0	0
25	FW	(Norway) NOR	Mohammed Abdellaoue	13	2	9+3	2	1	0
26	MF	(Norway) NOR	Aron Dønnum	9	1	1+6	0	1+1	1
27	MF	(Iceland) ISL	Samúel Friðjónsson	13	2	6+5	2	2	0
33	GK	(Ghana) GHA	Adam Larsen Kwarasey	17	0	14	0	3	0
39	MF	(Ghana) GHA	Ernest Agyiri	9	0	1+5	0	1+2	0
40	FW	(Nigeria) NGR	Chidera Ejuke	21	5	12+4	4	3+2	1
51	MF	(Norway) NOR	Bilal Njie	1	0	0+1	0	0	0
Players away from Vålerenga on loan:
29	MF	(Norway) NOR	Magnus Grødem	6	2	1+4	1	1	1
Players who left Vålerenga during the season:
9	MF	(Sweden) SWE	Rasmus Lindkvist	7	0	6	0	1	0
17	FW	(Norway) NOR	Muhamed Keita	6	1	3+3	1	0	0
30	GK	(Norway) NOR	Aslak Falch	1	0	0	0	1	0

=== Goal scorers ===
Place	Position	Nation	Number	Name	Eliteserien	Norwegian Cup	Total
1	MF	(Norway)	10	Ghayas Zahid	5	3	8
2	MF	(Norway)	14	Herman Stengel	6	0	6
3	MF	(Norway)	21	Simen Juklerød	5	0	5
3	MF	(Norway)	19	Christian Grindheim	5	0	5
3	FW	(Norway)	11	Bård Finne	4	1	5
3	FW	(Nigeria)	40	Chidera Ejuke	4	1	5
3	MF	(Norway)	20	Henrik Kjelsrud Johansen	3	2	5
8	DF	(Norway)	4	Jonatan Tollås	3	0	3
8	DF	(Estonia)	3	Enar Jääger	2	1	3
8	MF	(Norway)	6	Abdisalam Ibrahim	0	3	3
11	FW	(Norway)	25	Mohammed Abdellaoue	2	0	2
11	MF	(Iceland)	27	Samúel Friðjónsson	2	0	2
11	MF	(Norway)	8	Magnus Lekven	2	0	2
11	MF	(Norway)	29	Magnus Grødem	1	1	2
15	FW	(Norway)	17	Muhamed Keita	1	0	1
15	DF	(Sweden)	5	Robert Lundström	1	0	1
15	DF	(Norway)	22	Ivan Näsberg	1	0	1
15	MF	(Norway)	26	Aron Dønnum	0	1	1
15				Own goal	1	0	1
				TOTALS	48	14	62

=== Disciplinary record ===
Number	Nation	Position	Name	Eliteserien		Norwegian Cup		Total	
Number	Nation	Position	Name	Yellow card	Red card	Yellow card	Red card	Yellow card	Red card
1	(Sweden)	GK	Marcus Sandberg	2	0	0	0	2	0
3	(Estonia)	DF	Enar Jääger	2	0	0	0	2	0
4	(Norway)	DF	Jonatan Tollås	4	1	0	0	4	1
5	(Sweden)	DF	Robert Lundström	6	0	0	0	6	0
6	(Norway)	MF	Abdisalam Ibrahim	2	0	0	0	2	0
7	(Norway)	MF	Daniel Fredheim Holm	0	0	1	0	1	0
8	(Norway)	MF	Magnus Lekven	2	0	0	0	2	0
10	(Norway)	MF	Ghayas Zahid	4	0	2	0	6	0
11	(Norway)	FW	Bård Finne	1	0	0	0	1	0
14	(Norway)	MF	Herman Stengel	3	0	1	0	4	0
15	(Norway)	MF	Daniel Berntsen	3	0	0	0	3	0
19	(Norway)	MF	Christian Grindheim	2	0	0	0	2	0
20	(Norway)	FW	Henrik Kjelsrud Johansen	1	0	2	0	3	0
21	(Norway)	MF	Simen Juklerød	2	0	1	0	3	0
22	(Norway)	DF	Ivan Näsberg	4	0	0	0	4	0
23	(Norway)	MF	Felix Myhre	1	0	0	0	1	0
26	(Norway)	MF	Aron Dønnum	1	0	0	0	1	0
27	(Iceland)	MF	Samúel Friðjónsson	1	0	0	0	1	0
39	(Ghana)	MF	Ernest Agyiri	1	0	0	0	1	0
			TOTALS	42	1	7	0	49	1
