= 2018 Vålerenga Fotball season =

Vålerenga
2018 season
- Chairman: Thomas Baardseng
- Manager: Ronny Deila
- Stadium: Intility Arena
- Eliteserien: 6th
- Norwegian Cup: Quarterfinal vs Rosenborg
- Top goalscorer: League: Sam Johnson (11); All: Bård Finne (14)
- Highest home attendance: 14,740 (16 September vs. Rosenborg)
- Lowest home attendance: 6,063 (18 March vs. Odd)
- Average home league attendance: 9,180
Home colours	Away colours	Third colours

The 2018 season was Vålerenga's 17th consecutive year in the top flight now known as Eliteserien. They finished sixth in the Eliteserien and reached the Quarterfinal's of the Cup where they were knocked out by Rosenborg.

== Squad ==
As of 16 August 2018

Note: Flags indicate national team as defined under FIFA eligibility rules; some limited exceptions apply. Players may hold more than one non-FIFA nationality.

No.	Pos.	Nation	Player
3	DF	(Estonia) EST	Enar Jääger
4	DF	(Norway) NOR	Jonatan Tollås
5	DF	(Uruguay) URU	Felipe Carvalho
6	MF	(Norway) NOR	Abdisalam Ibrahim
7	MF	(Norway) NOR	Daniel Fredheim Holm
8	MF	(Norway) NOR	Magnus Lekven
10	FW	(Liberia) LBR	Sam Johnson
11	FW	(Norway) NOR	Bård Finne
13	GK	(Norway) NOR	Kristoffer Klaesson
14	MF	(Ghana) GHA	Mohammed Abu (on loan from Columbus Crew SC)
16	MF	(Sweden) SWE	Erik Israelsson (on loan from PEC Zwolle)
17	DF	(Norway) NOR	Leo Cornic
19	FW	(Nigeria) NGA	Peter Godly Michael
20	MF	(Norway) NOR	Sakarias Opsahl
21	GK	(Ghana) GHA	Adam Larsen Kwarasey

No.	Pos.	Nation	Player
22	DF	(Norway) NOR	Ivan Näsberg
23	MF	(Norway) NOR	Felix Myhre
24	DF	(Norway) NOR	Oskar Opsahl
25	DF	(Canada) CAN	Sam Adekugbe
26	FW	(Norway) NOR	Aron Dønnum
27	MF	(Iceland) ISL	Samúel Friðjónsson
29	MF	(Norway) NOR	Magnus Grødem
30	DF	(Norway) NOR	Harald Hauso
33	DF	(Norway) NOR	Amin Nouri
34	DF	(Norway) NOR	Jonas Levernes
35	FW	(Norway) NOR	Sander Werni
36	MF	(Norway) NOR	Osame Sahraoui
37	FW	(Norway) NOR	Kevin Ogudugu
38	GK	(Norway) NOR	Petter Karlsen
40	MF	(Nigeria) NGA	Chidera Ejuke

=== Out on loan ===
Note: Flags indicate national team as defined under FIFA eligibility rules; some limited exceptions apply. Players may hold more than one non-FIFA nationality.

No.	Pos.	Nation	Player
2	DF	(Norway) NOR	Markus Nakkim (on loan to Viking)
9	FW	(Norway) NOR	Fitim Azemi (on loan to Sandefjord)
18	DF	(Norway) NOR	Christian Borchgrevink (on loan to HamKam)

No.	Pos.	Nation	Player
28	FW	(Norway) NOR	Thomas Elsebutangen (on loan to Bærum)
38	DF	(Norway) NOR	Kristoffer Hay (on loan to Tromsdalen)

== Transfers ==
=== In ===
Date	Position	Nationality	Name	From	Fee	Ref.
19 December 2017	DF	(Uruguay)	Felipe Carvalho	Malmö FF	Undisclosed	
21 December 2017	DF	(Norway)	Amin Nouri	Brann	Undisclosed	
8 January 2018	DF	(Canada)	Sam Adekugbe	Vancouver Whitecaps	Undisclosed	
23 January 2018	FW	(Liberia)	Sam Johnson	Wuhan Zall	Undisclosed	
27 February 2018	FW	(Nigeria)	Peter Godly Michael	Rivers United	Undisclosed	
23 March 2018	DF	(Portugal)	João Meira	Chicago Fire	Undisclosed	
4 October 2018	MF	(Ghana)	Mohammed Abu	Columbus Crew SC	Undisclosed	

=== Out ===
Date	Position	Nationality	Name	To	Fee	Ref.
20 November 2017	MF	(Norway)	20 November 2017	Strømsgodset	Undisclosed	
7 December 2017	MF	(Norway)	Christian Grindheim	Haugesund	Undisclosed	
21 December 2017	DF	(Sweden)	Robert Lundström	AIK	Undisclosed	
16 January 2018	DF	(Norway)	Mathusan Sandrakumar	Bærum	Undisclosed	
22 January 2018	MF	(Norway)	Bilal Njie	Odd	Undisclosed	
28 February 2018	FW	(Norway)	Henrik Kjelsrud Johansen	Brann	Undisclosed	
23 March 2018	MF	(Norway)	Daniel Berntsen	Tromsø	Undisclosed	
17 July 2018	MF	(Norway)	Simen Juklerød	Royal Antwerp	Undisclosed	
3 August 2018	GK	(Sweden)	Marcus Sandberg	Stabæk	Undisclosed	

=== Loans in ===
Date from	Position	Nationality	Name	From	Date to	Ref.
31 August 2016	MF	(Ghana)	Ernest Agyiri	Manchester City	13 August 2018	
10 August 2018	MF	(Ghana)	Mohammed Abu	Columbus Crew	End of Season	
31 July 2018	MF	(Sweden)	Erik Israelsson	PEC Zwolle	End of Season	

=== Loans out ===
Date from	Position	Nationality	Name	to	Date to	Ref.
17 January 2018	DF	(Norway)	Kristoffer Hay	Tromsdalen	End of Season	
13 February 2018	FW	(Norway)	Thomas Elsebutangen	Bærum	End of Season	
19 February 2018	DF	(Norway)	Markus Nakkim	Viking	End of Season	
28 March 2018	MF	(Norway)	Aron Dønnum	HamKam	23 July 2018	
15 August 2018	DF	(Norway)	Christian Borchgrevink	HamKam	End of Season	
15 August 2018	FW	(Norway)	Fitim Azemi	Sandefjord	End of Season	

=== Released ===
Date	Position	Nationality	Name	Joined	Date	Ref.
7 December 2017	FW	(Norway)	Mohammed Abdellaoue	Retired		
9 July 2018	DF	(Portugal)	João Meira			

== Competitions ==
=== Eliteserien ===
==== Results summary ====
Overall								Home						Away					
Pld	W	D	L	GF	GA	GD	Pts	W	D	L	GF	GA	GD	W	D	L	GF	GA	GD
30	11	9	10	39	44	−5	42	7	5	3	23	19	+4	4	4	7	16	25	−9

Last updated: 24 November 2018.
Source: see below

==== Results by round ====
Round	1	2	3	4	5	6	7	8	9	10	11	12	13	14	15	16	17	18	19	20	21	22	23	24	25	26	27	28	29	30
Ground	A	H	A	H	A	H	A	H	A	H	A	H	A	A	H	A	H	A	H	H	A	H	A	H	A	H	A	H	A	H
Result	W	W	L	L	W	D	D	D	W	W	L	W	D	L	D	L	D	L	W	W	W	L	L	W	D	L	L	D	D	W
Position	6	2	4	6	4	7	7	7	5	5	6	6	6	8	8	9	9	9	7	7	6	6	7	6	7	8	8	8	8	6

Updated to match(es) played on 24 November 2018. Source: see below
A = Away; H = Home; W = Win; D = Draw; L = Loss

==== Results ====
12 March 2018 1	Kristiansund	0–1	Vålerenga	Kristiansund
19:00 CET (UTC+1)	Stokke (penalty missed) 66'; Coly (red card) 90+7'	Report	Johnson 63'; Adekugbe (yellow card) 90+7'	Stadium: Kristiansund Stadion; Attendance: 3,969; Referee: Tore Hansen

18 March 2018 2	Vålerenga	2–1	Odd	Oslo
20:00 CET (UTC+1)	Tollås (yellow card) 37' (goal) 60'; Juklerød (penalty missed) 50'; Friðjónsson (yellow card) 64'; Johnson 65'	Report	Njie 58'	Stadium: Intility Arena; Attendance: 6,063; Referee: Svein Oddvar Moen

2 April 2018 3	Sarpsborg 08	3–0	Vålerenga	Sarpsborg
18:00 CEST (UTC+2)	Mortensen 17', 90+1'; Tamm (yellow card) 47'; Tveita 66'; Schwartz (yellow card) 90'	Report	Johnson (yellow card) 19'; Tollås (yellow card) 61'; Adekugbe (yellow card) 90'	Stadium: Sarpsborg Stadion; Attendance: 6,149; Referee: Kai Erik Steen

7 April 2018 4	Vålerenga	1–4	Strømsgodset	Oslo
18:00 CEST (UTC+2)	Näsberg (yellow card) 21'; Ejuke 45+1'; Kwarasey (yellow card) 64'	Report	Pedersen 26', 65' (pen.); Nguen 48'; Stengel 90+6'	Stadium: Intility Arena; Attendance: 9,304; Referee: Tommy Skjerven

14 April 2018 5	Start	1–6	Vålerenga	Kristiansand
18:00 CEST (UTC+2)	Larsen (red card) 5'; Christensen 39'; Finnbogason (yellow card) 56'	Report	Holm 6'; Johnson 25'; Finne 50'; Ejuke 53' (yellow card) 77'; Friðjónsson 66'; Tollås 70'	Stadium: Sør Arena; Attendance: 5,007; Referee: Kai Erik Steen

22 April 2018 6	Vålerenga	0–0	Molde	Oslo
20:00 CEST (UTC+2)	Lekven (yellow card) 48'	Report	Moström (yellow card) 25'; Hestad (yellow card) 58'; Aursnes (yellow card) 75'	Stadium: Intility Arena; Attendance: 8,436; Referee: Dag Vidar Hafsås

28 April 2018 7	Ranheim	2–2	Vålerenga	Trondheim
18:00 CEST (UTC+2)	Løkberg 19'; Tønne 60'	Report	Johnson 27', 85'; Ibrahim (yellow card) 33'; Näsberg (yellow card) 51' (yellow-red card) 90+4'	Stadium: EXTRA Arena; Attendance: 2,068; Referee: Kristoffer Hagenes

6 May 2018 8	Vålerenga	2–2	Haugesund	Oslo
18:00 CEST (UTC+2)	Carvalho 23'; Holm (yellow card) 33'; Michael 81'	Report	Skjerve 16'; Knudsen 64'	Stadium: Intility Arena; Attendance: 7,708; Referee: Tom Harald Hagen

12 May 2018 9	Sandefjord	0–1	Vålerenga	Sandefjord
15:30 CEST (UTC+2)		Report	Adekugbe (yellow card) 11'; Friðjónsson (yellow card) 36'; Johnson 55' (pen.)	Stadium: Komplett Arena; Attendance: 3,826; Referee: Kai Erik Steen

16 May 2018 10	Vålerenga	1–0	Stabæk	Oslo
18:00 CEST (UTC+2)	Johnson 14'; Nouri (yellow card) 68'; Tollås (yellow card) 90+3'	Report		Stadium: Intility Arena; Attendance: 11,124; Referee: Svein Oddvar Moen

21 May 2018 11	Tromsø	3–0	Vålerenga	Tromsø
18:00 CEST (UTC+2)	Antonsen 7'; Wangberg 45'; Berntsen 77'	Report	Ejuke (yellow card) 43'; Ibrahim (yellow card) 82'	Stadium: Alfheim Stadion; Attendance: 3,914; Referee: Sigurd Kringstad

26 May 2018 12	Vålerenga	1–0	Lillestrøm	Oslo
17:00 CEST (UTC+2)	Johnson (yellow card) 62'; Finne 90+6'	Report	Kippe (yellow card) 87'; Amundsen (yellow card) 89'	Stadium: Intility Arena; Attendance: 13,527; Referee: Kai Erik Steen

10 June 2018 13	Brann	0–0	Vålerenga	Bergen
20:00 CEST (UTC+2)	Koomson (yellow card) 90+6'	Report	Ibrahim (yellow card) 79'	Stadium: Brann Stadion; Attendance: 12,004; Referee: Dag Vidar Hafsås

24 June 2018 14	Rosenborg	3–0	Vålerenga	Trondheim
20:00 CEST (UTC+2)	Konradsen 13'; Helland 25'; Søderlund (yellow card) 48'; Bendtner 54' (pen.)	Report	Ibrahim (yellow card) 24'; Fredheim Holm (yellow card) 55'; Meira (yellow card) 68'	Stadium: Lerkendal Stadion; Attendance: 16,249; Referee: Tom Harald Hagen

30 June 2018 15	Vålerenga	2–2	Bodø/Glimt	Oslo
18:00 CEST (UTC+2)	Lekven 29' (yellow card) 83'; Myhre 55'; Carvalho (yellow card) 90+1'	Report	Layouni 21'; Bjørnbak 84'; Moberg (yellow card) 89'; Moe (yellow card) 90+2'	Stadium: Intility Arena; Attendance: 7,872; Referee: Tommy Skjerven

8 July 2018 16	Molde	5–1	Vålerenga	Molde
20:00 CEST (UTC+2)	Moström 5'; Haaland 20', 57'; Sarr 27' (yellow card) 28'; Chima 71'	Report	Finne 31'; Ibrahim (yellow card) 45+1' (yellow-red card) 80'; Tollås (yellow card) 52'	Stadium: Aker Stadion; Attendance: 7,012; Referee: Kai Erik Steen

5 August 2018 17	Vålerenga	2–2	Sandefjord	Oslo
18:00 CEST (UTC+2)	Michael 89'; Myhre 90+3'	Report	Kastrati 3' (pen.) (yellow card) 73'; Vales (yellow card) 56'; Ofkir (yellow card) 62' (goal) 80'; Vallès (yellow card) 89'	Stadium: Intility Arena; Attendance: 7,005; Referee: Tom Harald Hagen

13 August 2018 18	Haugesund	1–0	Vålerenga	Haugesund
19:00 CEST (UTC+2)	Tronstad (yellow card) 45'; Stølås 55'	Report	Finne (yellow card) 31'; Holm (yellow card) 42'; Tollås (yellow card) 90+1'	Stadium: Haugesund Stadion; Attendance: 4,083; Referee: Kai Erik Steen

19 August 2018 19	Vålerenga	3–0	Tromsø	Oslo
20:00 CEST (UTC+2)	Finne 6'; Grødem 89'; Michael 90+3'	Report		Stadium: Intility Arena; Attendance: 8,254; Referee: Tore Hansen

26 August 2018 20	Vålerenga	2–0	Brann	Oslo
20:00 CEST (UTC+2)	Nouri 56'; Adekugbe (yellow card) 90+2'; Myhre 90+5'	Report	Haugen (yellow card) 3'; Bamba (yellow card) 70'	Stadium: Intility Arena; Attendance: 11,759; Referee: Rohit Saggi

2 September 2018 21	Lillestrøm	0–1	Vålerenga	Lillestrøm
20:00 CEST (UTC+2)	Smárason (yellow card) 43'; Kippe (yellow card) 76'	Report	Finne 33' (yellow card) 36'; Tollås (yellow card) 49'; Holm (yellow card) 74'; Nouri (yellow card) 77'	Stadium: Åråsen Stadion; Attendance: 10,409; Referee: Tom Harald Hagen

16 September 2018 22	Vålerenga	2–3	Rosenborg	Oslo
20:00 CEST (UTC+2)	Johnson 36'; Nouri 58'	Report	Levi 45'; Jääger 50' (o.g.); Meling (yellow card) 72'; Jebali 90+5' (yellow card) 90+6'	Stadium: Intility Arena; Attendance: 14,740; Referee: Svein Oddvar Moen

22 September 2018 23	Odd	3–2	Vålerenga	Skien
CEST (UTC+2)	Ruud 39'; Børven 66', 79'	Report	Johnson (yellow card) 29'; Ejuke 48'; Abu (yellow card) 49'; Finne 68'	Stadium: Skagerak Arena; Attendance: 6,053; Referee: Kristoffer Hagenes

30 September 2018 24	Vålerenga	3–2	Start	Oslo
18:00 CEST (UTC+2)	Johnson 25', 57'; Abu (yellow card) 38'; Israelsson (yellow card) 65'; Dønnum (yellow card) 88'; Finne 89'	Report	Robstad (yellow card) 77'; Bringaker 88'; Shala 90+1'	Stadium: Intility Arena; Attendance: 8,200; Referee: Dag Vidar Hafsås

6 October 2018 25	Stabæk	1–1	Vålerenga	Bærum
15:30 CEST (UTC+2)	Boli 41' (yellow card) 81'; Keita (yellow card) 86'	Report	Johnson 87' (pen.); Dønnum (yellow card) 90+2'	Stadium: Nadderud Stadion; Attendance: 4,021; Referee: Tom Harald Hagen

21 October 2018 26	Vålerenga	0–2	Kristiansund	Oslo
18:00 CEST (UTC+2)		Report	Kalludra 51'; Kastrati 62'	Stadium: Intility Arena; Attendance: 7,927; Referee: Tore Hansen

27 October 2018 27	Strømsgodset	2–0	Vålerenga	Drammen
18:00 CEST (UTC+2)	Hauger (yellow card) 54'; Nguen 56'; Andersen 70'	Report	Tollås (yellow card) 18'; Grødem (yellow card) 78'	Stadium: Marienlyst Stadion; Attendance: 6,855; Referee: Tommy Skjerven

4 November 2018 28	Vålerenga	0–0	Sarpsborg 08	Oslo
18:00 CET (UTC+1)		Report		Stadium: Intility Arena; Attendance: 7,918; Referee: Sigurd Kringstad

11 November 2018 29	Bodø/Glimt	1–1	Vålerenga	Bodø
18:00 CET (UTC+1)	Zinckernagel 12'; Evjen (yellow card) 54'; José Ángel (yellow card) 90+1'	Report	Finne 41'; Lekven (yellow card) 45'; Nouri (yellow card) 75'; Ibrahim (yellow card) 88'	Stadium: Aspmyra Stadion; Attendance: 4,023; Referee: Tore Hansen

24 November 2018 30	Vålerenga	2–1	Ranheim	Oslo
18:00 CET (UTC+1)	Finne 51', 53'	Report	Dønnem (yellow card) 58'; Storflor 90+2'	Stadium: Intility Arena; Attendance: 7,860; Referee: Rohit Saggi

==== Table ====
Pos	Team	Pld	W	D	L	GF	GA	GD	Pts	Qualification or relegation
4	Haugesund	30	16	5	9	45	33	+12	53	Qualification for the Europa League first qualifying round
5	Kristiansund	30	13	7	10	46	41	+5	46	
6	Vålerenga	30	11	9	10	39	44	−5	42	
7	Ranheim	30	12	6	12	43	50	−7	42	
8	Sarpsborg 08	30	11	8	11	46	39	+7	41	

Source: Football Association of Norway (in Norwegian), Soccerway
Rules for classification: 1) Points; 2) Goal difference; 3) Goals scored; 4) Head-to-head points; 5) Head-to-head goal difference; 6) Head-to-head away goals scored (only if between two teams); 7) Head-to-head goals scored; 8) Play-off (only used to decide champions or relegation).

=== Norwegian Cup ===
18 April 2018 First Round	Årvoll	0–8	Vålerenga	Oslo
18:00 CEST (UTC+2)		Report	Meira 31'; Juklerød 34', 37'; Azemi 39', 47'; Finne 40'; Michael 52'; Borchgrevink 83'	Stadium: Årvoll Kunstgress; Attendance: 2,678; Referee: Per Erik Haugen

1 May 2018 Second Round	Grorud	0–1	Vålerenga	Oslo
18:00 CEST (UTC+2)	Z.Ahmed (yellow card) 7'; F.Dahir (yellow card) 34'; F.Ahmed (yellow card) 43'; G.Meyer (yellow card) 69'	Report	Carvalho 24' (yellow card) 43'; Tollås (yellow card) 40'; Ibrahim (yellow card) 43'	Stadium: Grorud Matchbane; Attendance: 1,455; Referee: Mohammad Usman Aslam

9 May 2018 Third Round	Skeid	1–2	Vålerenga	Oslo
19:15 CEST (UTC+2)	M.Can (yellow card) 62'; Godoy 65'	Report	Myhre (yellow card) 13'; Finne 38'; Carvalho 51'; Adekugbe (yellow card) 72'; Ibrahim (yellow card) 90+1'	Stadium: Nordre Åsen; Attendance: 2,623; Referee: Espen Eskås

14 June 2018 Fourth Round	Tromsø	3–3 (a.e.t.) (4–5 p)	Vålerenga	Tromsø
18:00 CEST (UTC+2)	Berntsen 31'; Vuk (yellow card) 33'; Espejord 69', 100'; Gundersen (yellow card) 120+1'	Report	Finne 3', 94'; Nouri (yellow card) 80'; Ejuke (yellow card) 81'; Johnson 82'; Adekugbe (yellow card) 87'; Holm (yellow card) 98' (yellow-red card) 115'	Stadium: Alfheim Stadion; Attendance: 2,166; Referee: Rohit Saggi
	Penalties
	Espejord (penalty scored); Gundersen (penalty missed); Bakenga (penalty scored); Samb (penalty scored); Taylor (penalty scored)		(penalty scored) Tollås; (penalty scored) Juklerød; (penalty missed) Johnson; (penalty scored) Adekugbe; (penalty scored) Ejuke

26 September 2018 Quarterfinal	Rosenborg	2–0	Vålerenga	Trondheim
20:00 CEST (UTC+2)	Denić 17'; Søderlund 54'	Report	Myhre (yellow card) 25'; Abu (yellow card) 79'; Grødem (yellow card) 89'	Stadium: Lerkendal Stadion; Attendance: 6,579; Referee: Kai Erik Steen

== Squad statistics ==
As of match played 24 November 2018

=== Appearances and goals ===
No.	Pos	Nat	Player	Total		Eliteserien		Norwegian Cup	
No.	Pos	Nat	Player	Apps	Goals	Apps	Goals	Apps	Goals
3	DF	(Estonia) EST	Enar Jääger	3	0	1+2	0	0	0
4	DF	(Norway) NOR	Jonatan Tollås	31	2	27	2	4	0
5	DF	(Uruguay) URU	Felipe Carvalho	27	3	20+2	1	5	2
6	MF	(Norway) NOR	Abdisalam Ibrahim	19	0	12+5	0	2	0
7	MF	(Norway) NOR	Daniel Fredheim Holm	25	1	23+1	1	1	0
8	MF	(Norway) NOR	Magnus Lekven	22	1	19+1	1	2	0
9	FW	(Norway) NOR	Fitim Azemi	4	2	0+3	0	1	2
10	FW	(Liberia) LBR	Sam Johnson	28	12	24	11	3+1	1
11	FW	(Norway) NOR	Bård Finne	30	14	21+4	10	4+1	4
13	GK	(Norway) NOR	Kristoffer Klaesson	1	0	0	0	0+1	0
14	MF	(Ghana) GHA	Mohammed Abu	11	0	10	0	1	0
16	MF	(Sweden) SWE	Erik Israelsson	11	0	10	0	1	0
18	DF	(Norway) NOR	Christian Borchgrevink	3	1	1+1	0	1	1
19	FW	(Nigeria) NGA	Peter Godly Michael	15	4	4+9	3	1+1	1
21	GK	(Ghana) GHA	Adam Kwarasey	31	0	30	0	1	0
22	DF	(Norway) NOR	Ivan Näsberg	17	0	14	0	3	0
23	MF	(Norway) NOR	Felix Myhre	24	3	6+13	3	4+1	0
25	DF	(Canada) CAN	Sam Adekugbe	30	0	26+1	0	1+2	0
26	MF	(Norway) NOR	Aron Dønnum	9	0	0+8	0	0+1	0
27	MF	(Iceland) ISL	Samúel Friðjónsson	20	1	11+6	1	1+2	0
29	MF	(Norway) NOR	Magnus Grødem	26	1	7+14	1	4+1	0
33	DF	(Norway) NOR	Amin Nouri	34	2	29+1	2	3+1	0
40	FW	(Nigeria) NGA	Chidera Ejuke	32	3	26+3	3	2+1	0
Players away from Vålerenga on loan:
Players who left Vålerenga during the season:
1	GK	(Sweden) SWE	Marcus Sandberg	4	0	0	0	4	0
14	MF	(Ghana) GHA	Ernest Agyiri	7	0	0+5	0	2	0
17	MF	(Norway) NOR	Simen Juklerød	15	2	7+4	0	3+1	2
30	DF	(Portugal) POR	João Meira	4	1	1+1	0	1+1	1

=== Goal scorers ===
Place	Position	Nation	Number	Name	Eliteserien	Norwegian Cup	Total
1	FW	(Norway)	11	Bård Finne	10	4	14
2	MF	(Liberia)	10	Sam Johnson	11	1	12
3	MF	(Nigeria)	19	Peter Godly Michael	3	1	4
4	MF	(Norway)	23	Felix Myhre	3	0	3
4	FW	(Nigeria)	40	Chidera Ejuke	3	0	3
4	DF	(Uruguay)	5	Felipe Carvalho	1	2	3
7	DF	(Norway)	4	Jonatan Tollås	2	0	2
7	DF	(Norway)	33	Amin Nouri	2	0	2
7	MF	(Norway)	17	Simen Juklerød	0	2	2
7	FW	(Norway)	9	Fitim Azemi	0	2	2
11	MF	(Norway)	7	Daniel Fredheim Holm	1	0	1
11	MF	(Iceland)	27	Samúel Friðjónsson	1	0	1
11	MF	(Norway)	8	Magnus Lekven	1	0	1
11	MF	(Norway)	29	Magnus Grødem	1	0	1
11	DF	(Portugal)	30	João Meira	0	1	1
11	DF	(Norway)	18	Christian Borchgrevink	0	1	1
				TOTALS	39	14	53

=== Disciplinary record ===
Number	Nation	Position	Name	Eliteserien		Norwegian Cup		Total	
Number	Nation	Position	Name	Booked	Sent off (straight red)	Booked	Sent off (straight red)	Booked	Sent off (straight red)
4	(Norway)	DF	Jonatan Tollås	7	0	1	0	8	0
5	(Uruguay)	DF	Felipe Carvalho	1	0	1	0	2	0
6	(Norway)	MF	Abdisalam Ibrahim	7	1	1	0	8	1
7	(Norway)	MF	Daniel Fredheim Holm	4	0	2	1	6	1
8	(Norway)	MF	Magnus Lekven	3	0	0	0	3	0
10	(Liberia)	FW	Sam Johnson	3	0	0	0	3	0
11	(Norway)	FW	Bård Finne	2	0	0	0	2	0
14	(Ghana)	MF	Mohammed Abu	2	0	1	0	3	0
16	(Sweden)	MF	Erik Israelsson	1	0	0	0	1	0
21	(Ghana)	GK	Adam Kwarasey	1	0	0	0	1	0
22	(Norway)	DF	Ivan Näsberg	3	1	0	0	3	1
23	(Norway)	MF	Felix Myhre	0	0	2	0	2	0
25	(Canada)	DF	Sam Adekugbe	4	0	2	0	6	0
26	(Norway)	MF	Aron Dønnum	2	0	0	0	2	0
27	(Iceland)	MF	Samúel Friðjónsson	2	0	0	0	2	0
29	(Norway)	MF	Magnus Grødem	1	0	1	0	2	0
33	(Norway)	DF	Amin Nouri	3	0	1	0	4	0
40	(Nigeria)	FW	Chidera Ejuke	2	0	1	0	3	0
Players who left Vålerenga during the season:
30	(Portugal)	DF	João Meira	1	0	0	0	1	0
			TOTALS	49	2	13	1	62	3
