= 2015 Djurgårdens IF season =

Djurgårdens IF
2015 season
- Chairman: Lars-Erik Sjöberg
- Manager: Pelle Olsson
- Stadium: Tele2 Arena
- Allsvenskan: 6th
- Svenska Cupen: Group stage
- Top goalscorer: League: Nyasha Mushekwi (12); All: Nyasha Mushekwi (12)
- Highest home attendance: 27,428 (25 May vs Hammarby, Allsvenskan)
- Lowest home attendance: 2,381 (5 March vs IFK Norrköping, Svenska Cupen)
- Average home league attendance: 15,484
| Home colours | Away colours |

The 2015 season was Djurgårdens IF's 115th in existence, their 60th season in Allsvenskan and their 15th consecutive season in the league. They were competing in Allsvenskan, Svenska Cupen. League play started in early April and lasted until early November. Pelle Olsson made his second season as manager.

== Squad information ==
=== Squad ===
- updated 14 November 2015.

| N | Pos. | Nat. | Name | Age | EU | Since | App | Goals | Ends | Transfer fee | Notes |
|---|---|---|---|---|---|---|---|---|---|---|---|
| 2 | LB | (Sweden) | Jesper Arvidsson | 41 | EU | 2013 | 75 | 1 | 2015 | Free | |
| 3 | CB | (Sweden) | Fredrik Stenman | 43 | EU | 2014 | 115 | 9 | 2015 | Free | |
| 5 | RB | (Sweden) | Stefan Karlsson | 37 | EU | 2014 | 47 | 0 | 2016 | Undisclosed | |
| 6 | CM | (Sweden) | Alexander Faltsetas | 39 | EU | 2014 | 58 | 3 | 2016 | Undisclosed | Second nationality: (Greece) GRE |
| 7 | MF | (South Korea) | Moon Seon-min | 33 | Non-EU | 2015 | 11 | 1 | 2015 | Loan | |
| 8 | CM | (Sweden) | Kevin Walker | 37 | EU | 2015 | 25 | 2 | 2017 | Free | Second nationality: (Republic of Ireland) IRL |
| 9 | RW | (Bosnia and Herzegovina) | Haris Radetinac | 41 | EU | 2013 | 54 | 10 | 2016 | Undisclosed | Second nationality: (Sweden) SWE |
| 10 | LW | (Norway) | Daniel Berntsen | 35 | EU | 2015 | 32 | 7 | 2017 | Undisclosed | |
| 11 | FW | (Sweden) | Amadou Jawo | 42 | EU | 2013 | 78 | 21 | 2018 | Undisclosed | Second nationality: (The Gambia) GAM |
| 12 | GK | (Norway) | Kenneth Høie | 47 | EU | 2012 | 113 | 0 | 2016 | Undisclosed | |
| 13 | CB | (Sweden) | Emil Bergström (captain) | 33 | EU | 2011 | 144 | 8 | 2017 | Youth system | |
| 14 | LB | (Sweden) | Elliot Käck | 37 | EU | 2015 | 21 | 0 | 2017 | Free | From Youth system |
| 15 | DF | (The Gambia) | Omar Colley | 34 | Non-EU | 2015 | 30 | 3 | 2017 | Free | |
| 16 | FW | (Sweden) | Sebastian Andersson | 35 | EU | 2014 | 37 | 16 | 2016 | Undisclosed | |
| 17 | DF | (Sweden) | Tim Björkström | 35 | EU | 2015 | 27 | 0 | 2017 | Free | |
| 18 | MF | (Sweden) | Kerim Mrabti | 32 | EU | 2015 | 32 | 4 | 2018 | Undisclosed | |
| 19 | MF | (South Korea) | Soon Yong-Yoon | 30 | Non-EU | 2015 | 1 | 0 | 2017 | Undisclosed | |
| 20 | FW | (Liberia) | Sam Johnson | 33 | Non-EU | 2015 | 32 | 10 | 2018 | Undisclosed | |
| 21 | FW | (Zimbabwe) | Nyasha Mushekwi | 39 | Non-EU | 2015 | 21 | 12 | 2015 | Loan | |
| 22 | MF | (Sweden) | Jesper Karlström | 31 | EU | 2015 | 29 | 2 | 2018 | Undisclosed | |
| 23 | GK | (Sweden) | Hampus Nilsson | 36 | EU | 2013 | 6 | 0 | 2018 | Free | |
| 24 | FW | (Zimbabwe) | Tinotenda Kadewere | 30 | Non-EU | 2015 | 6 | 1 | 2015 | Loan | |

=== Transfers ===
==== In ====
| No. | Pos. | Nat. | Name | Age | EU | Moving from | Type | Transfer window | Ends | Transfer fee | Source |
|---|---|---|---|---|---|---|---|---|---|---|---|
| 15 | DF | (The Gambia) | Omar Colley | 21 | Non-EU | KuPS (Finland) | Transfer | Winter | 2017 | Free | dif.se |
| 14 | LB | (Sweden) | Elliot Käck | 25 | EU | IK Sirius | Transfer | Winter | 2017 | Free | dif.se |
| 17 | DF | (Sweden) | Tim Björkström | 23 | EU | IF Brommapojkarna | Transfer | Winter | 2017 | Free | dif.se |
| 8 | MF | (Sweden) | Kevin Walker | 25 | EU | GIF Sundsvall | Transfer | Winter | 2017 | Free | dif.se |
| 10 | LW | (Norway) | Daniel Berntsen | 21 | EU | Rosenborg (Norway) | Transfer | Winter | 2017 | Undisclosed | dif.se |
| 20 | FW | (Liberia) | Sam Johnson | 21 | Non-EU | IK Frej | Transfer | Winter | 2018 | Undisclosed | dif.se |
| 22 | MF | (Sweden) | Jesper Karlström | 19 | EU | IF Brommapojkarna | Transfer | Winter | 2018 | Undisclosed | dif.se |
| 18 | MF | (Sweden) | Kerim Mrabti | 20 | EU | IK Sirius | Transfer | Winter | 2019 | Undisclosed | dif.se |
| 19 | MF | (South Korea) | Soon Yong-Yoon | 19 | Non-EU | Nike Academy (England) | Transfer | Winter | 2017 | Undisclosed | dif.se |
| 21 | FW | (Zimbabwe) | Nyasha Mushekwi | 27 | Non-EU | Mamelodi Sundowns (South Africa) | Loan | Winter | 2015 | | dif.se |
| 27 | MF | (South Korea) | Moon Seon-min | 22 | Non-EU | Östersunds FK | Loan | Winter | 2015 | | dif.se |
| 24 | FW | (Zimbabwe) | Tinotenda Kadewere | 19 | Non-EU | Harare City (Zimbabwe) | Loan | Summer | 2015 | | dif.se |

==== Out ====
| No. | Pos. | Nat. | Name | Age | EU | Moving to | Type | Transfer window | Transfer fee | Source |
|---|---|---|---|---|---|---|---|---|---|---|
| 8 | MF | (Sweden) | Andreas Johansson | 36 | EU | Retired | End of contract | Winter | | dif.se |
| 14 | DF | (Sweden) | Mattias Östberg | 37 | EU | Retired | End of contract | Winter | | dif.se |
| 10 | FW | (Sweden) | Erton Fejzullahu | 26 | EU | Beijing Sinobo Guoan (China) | Transfer | Winter | £0,880,000 | dif.se |
| 36 | DF | (Sweden) | Philip Sparrdal Mantilla | 21 | EU | IFK Mariehamn (Finland) | End of contract | Winter | Free | dif.se |
| 32 | GK | (Sweden) | Eric Dahlgren | 20 | EU | | End of contract | Winter | | |
| 20 | MF | (Sweden) | Simon Tibbling | 20 | EU | Groningen (Netherlands) | Transfer | Winter | £1,140,000 | dif.se |
| | DF | (Sweden) | Frej Ersa Engberg | 19 | EU | IK Sirius | Loan | Winter | | dif.se |
| 22 | MF | (Sweden) | Philip Hellquist | 23 | EU | Wiener Neustadt (Austria) | End of contract | Winter | Free | dif.se |
| 35 | MF | (Sweden) | Christian Rubio Sivodedov | 17 | EU | Schalke 04 (Germany) | Transfer | Winter | £0,352,000 | dif.se |
| 32 | MF | (Sweden) | Tim Söderström | 20 | EU | Jönköpings Södra IF | Loan | Winter | | dif.se |
| | LB | (Thailand) | Kevin Deeromram | 17 | EU | Werder Bremen (Germany) | Loan | Winter | | dif.se |
| | DF | (Sweden) | Jakob Glasberg | 19 | EU | IK Frej | Loan | Winter | | dif.se |
| 15 | MF | (South Africa) | Mark Mayambela | 27 | Non-EU | | End of contract | Winter | Free | [] |
| 17 | MF | (South Africa) | Xolani Mdaki | 22 | Non-EU | Mamelodi Sundowns (South Africa) | End of loan | Winter | | [] |
| 19 | MF | (Sweden) | Nahir Oyal | 24 | EU | | End of contract | Winter | Free | dif.se |
| 7 | MF | (Sweden) | Martin Broberg | 24 | EU | Örebro SK | Transfer | Summer | Undisclosed | dif.se |

== Player statistics ==
As of 1 November 2015 Appearances for competitive matches only.

| No. | Pos | Nat | Player | Total | | Allsvenskan | | 2014–15 Svenska Cupen 2015–16 Svenska Cupen | |
| No. | Pos | Nat | Player | Apps | Goals | Apps | Goals | Apps | Goals |
|---|---|---|---|---|---|---|---|---|---|
| 2 | DF | (Sweden) SWE | Jesper Arvidsson | 29 | 4 | 26 | 4 | 3 | 0 |
| 3 | DF | (Sweden) SWE | Fredrik Stenman | 7 | 0 | 6 | 0 | 1 | 0 |
| 5 | DF | (Sweden) SWE | Stefan Karlsson | 13 | 0 | 10 | 0 | 3 | 0 |
| 6 | MF | (Sweden) SWE | Alexander Faltsetas | 28 | 0 | 24 | 0 | 4 | 0 |
| 7 | MF | (Sweden) SWE | Martin Broberg | 1 | 0 | 0 | 0 | 1 | 0 |
| 7 | MF | (South Korea) KOR | Seon-Min Moon | 11 | 1 | 10 | 1 | 1 | 0 |
| 8 | MF | (Sweden) SWE | Kevin Walker | 25 | 2 | 23 | 2 | 2 | 0 |
| 9 | MF | (Bosnia and Herzegovina) BIH | Haris Radetinac | 16 | 2 | 13 | 0 | 3 | 2 |
| 10 | MF | (Norway) NOR | Daniel Berntsen | 32 | 7 | 28 | 6 | 4 | 1 |
| 11 | FW | (Sweden) SWE | Amadou Jawo | 15 | 1 | 11 | 0 | 4 | 1 |
| 12 | GK | (Norway) NOR | Kenneth Høie | 30 | 0 | 28 | 0 | 2 | 0 |
| 13 | DF | (Sweden) SWE | Emil Bergström | 33 | 3 | 29 | 2 | 4 | 1 |
| 14 | DF | (Sweden) SWE | Elliot Käck | 21 | 0 | 19 | 0 | 2 | 0 |
| 15 | DF | (The Gambia) GAM | Omar Colley | 30 | 3 | 27 | 3 | 3 | 0 |
| 16 | FW | (Sweden) SWE | Sebastian Andersson | 23 | 9 | 22 | 7 | 1 | 2 |
| 17 | DF | (Sweden) SWE | Tim Björkström | 27 | 0 | 25 | 0 | 2 | 0 |
| 18 | MF | (Sweden) SWE | Kerim Mrabti | 32 | 4 | 28 | 4 | 4 | 0 |
| 19 | MF | (South Korea) KOR | Soon Yong-Yoon | 1 | 0 | 0 | 0 | 1 | 0 |
| 20 | FW | (Liberia) LBR | Sam Johnson | 32 | 10 | 29 | 10 | 3 | 0 |
| 21 | FW | (Zimbabwe) ZIM | Nyasha Mushekwi | 21 | 12 | 21 | 12 | 0 | 0 |
| 22 | MF | (Sweden) SWE | Jesper Karlström | 29 | 3 | 26 | 1 | 3 | 2 |
| 23 | GK | (Sweden) SWE | Hampus Nilsson | 4 | 0 | 2 | 0 | 2 | 0 |
| 24 | FW | (Zimbabwe) ZIM | Tinotenda Kadewere | 6 | 1 | 5 | 0 | 1 | 1 |

=== Goals ===
==== Total ====
| Name | Goals |
|---|---|
| (Zimbabwe) Nyasha Mushekwi | 12 |
| (Liberia) Sam Johnson | 10 |
| (Sweden) Sebastian Andersson | 9 |
| (Norway) Daniel Berntsen | 7 |
| (Sweden) Jesper Arvidsson | 4 |
| (Sweden) Kerim Mrabti | 4 |
| (Sweden) Emil Bergström | 3 |
| (The Gambia) Omar Colley | 3 |
| (Sweden) Jesper Karlström | 3 |
| (Bosnia and Herzegovina) Haris Radetinac | 2 |
| (Sweden) Kevin Walker | 2 |
| (Sweden) Amadou Jawo | 1 |
| (Zimbabwe) Tinotenda Kadewere | 1 |
| (South Korea) Moon Seon-min | 1 |

==== Allsvenskan ====
| Name | Goals |
|---|---|
| (Zimbabwe) Nyasha Mushekwi | 12 |
| (Liberia) Sam Johnson | 10 |
| (Sweden) Sebastian Andersson | 7 |
| (Norway) Daniel Berntsen | 6 |
| (Sweden) Jesper Arvidsson | 4 |
| (Sweden) Kerim Mrabti | 4 |
| (The Gambia) Omar Colley | 3 |
| (Sweden) Emil Bergström | 2 |
| (Sweden) Kevin Walker | 2 |
| (Sweden) Jesper Karlström | 1 |
| (South Korea) Moon Seon-min | 1 |

==== Svenska Cupen ====
| Name | Goals |
|---|---|
| (Sweden) Sebastian Andersson | 2 |
| (Sweden) Jesper Karlström | 2 |
| (Bosnia and Herzegovina) Haris Radetinac | 2 |
| (Sweden) Emil Bergström | 1 |
| (Norway) Daniel Berntsen | 1 |
| (Sweden) Amadou Jawo | 1 |
| (Zimbabwe) Tinotenda Kadewere | 1 |

== Competitions ==
=== Overall ===
| Competition | Started round | Current position / round | Final position / round | First match | Last match |
|---|---|---|---|---|---|
| Allsvenskan | N/A | N/A | | 6 April 2015 | 31 October 2015 |
| 2014–15 Svenska Cupen | Round 2 | — | Group stage | 20 August 2014 | 5 March 2015 |
| 2015–16 Svenska Cupen | Round 2 | Round 2 | | 2015 | |

Source: Competitions

=== Allsvenskan ===
==== League table ====
| Pos | Team | Pld | W | D | L | GF | GA | GD | Pts | Qualification or relegation |
|---|---|---|---|---|---|---|---|---|---|---|
| 4 | IF Elfsborg | 30 | 16 | 7 | 7 | 59 | 42 | +17 | 55 | |
| 5 | Malmö FF | 30 | 15 | 9 | 6 | 54 | 34 | +20 | 54 | |
| 6 | Djurgårdens IF | 30 | 14 | 9 | 7 | 52 | 37 | +15 | 51 | |
| 7 | BK Häcken | 30 | 13 | 6 | 11 | 45 | 39 | +6 | 45 | Qualification for the Europa League second qualifying round (Note: BK Häcken qualified for the Europa League second qualifying round by winning the 2015–16 Svenska Cupen.) |
| 8 | Helsingborgs IF | 30 | 11 | 4 | 15 | 43 | 45 | −2 | 37 | |

Source: svenskfotboll.se (in Swedish)
Rules for classification: 1) Points; 2) Goal difference; 3) Goals scored; 4) Head-to-head points; 5) Head-to-head goal difference; 6) Head-to-head away goals scored; 7) Play-off
(Note: Play-off is only played if need to decide champion, teams for relegation or UEFA competition and will be played on a neutral ground).

==== Results summary ====
| Overall | | | | | | | | Home | | | | | | Away | | | | | |
| Pld | W | D | L | GF | GA | GD | Pts | W | D | L | GF | GA | GD | W | D | L | GF | GA | GD |
|---|---|---|---|---|---|---|---|---|---|---|---|---|---|---|---|---|---|---|---|
| 30 | 14 | 9 | 7 | 52 | 37 | +15 | 51 | 7 | 6 | 2 | 31 | 20 | +11 | 7 | 3 | 5 | 21 | 17 | +4 |

Source: svenskfotboll.se (in Swedish)

==== Results by round ====
| Round | 1 | 2 | 3 | 4 | 5 | 6 | 7 | 8 | 9 | 10 | 11 | 12 | 13 | 14 | 15 | 16 | 17 | 18 | 19 | 20 | 21 | 22 | 23 | 24 | 25 | 26 | 27 | 28 | 29 | 30 |
|---|---|---|---|---|---|---|---|---|---|---|---|---|---|---|---|---|---|---|---|---|---|---|---|---|---|---|---|---|---|---|
| Ground | H | A | A | H | A | H | H | A | A | H | A | H | A | H | A | H | A | H | A | A | H | H | A | H | A | H | A | H | A | H |
| Result | L | D | L | W | W | W | W | W | W | D | D | D | D | W | W | D | W | W | L | L | D | W | L | L | L | D | W | D | W | W |
| Position | 11 | 10 | 13 | 9 | 7 | 7 | 5 | 4 | 3 | 3 | 5 | 5 | 5 | 4 | 4 | 4 | 4 | 4 | 6 | 6 | 6 | 6 | 6 | 6 | 6 | 6 | 6 | 6 | 6 | 6 |

Source: see below
A = Away; H = Home; W = Win; D = Draw; L = Loss

==== Matches ====
Kickoff times are in UTC+2 unless stated otherwise.

| 5 April 2015 Round 1 | Djurgårdens IF | 1–2 | IF Elfsborg | Stockholm |
| 17:30 | Berntsen 81' | Report | Frick 25'; Zeneli 77' | Stadium: Tele2 Arena; Attendance: 20,530; Referee: Martin Strömbergsson |

| 9 April 2015 Round 2 | BK Häcken | 1–1 | Djurgårdens IF | Gothenburg |
| 19:00 | Makondele 62' | Report | Mushekwi 58' | Stadium: Gamla Ullevi; Attendance: 3,417; Referee: Markus Strömbergsson |

| 13 April 2015 Round 3 | Hammarby IF | 2–1 | Djurgårdens IF | Stockholm |
| 19:00 | Bakircioglü 55'; Besara 60' | Report | Johnson 26' | Stadium: Tele2 Arena; Attendance: 27,597; Referee: Michael Lerjéus |

| 17 April 2015 Round 4 | Djurgårdens IF | 1–0 | Kalmar FF | Stockholm |
| 19:00 | Mushekwi 77' | Report | | Stadium: Tele2 Arena; Attendance: 10,369; Referee: Glenn Nyberg |

| 26 April 2015 Round 5 | GIF Sundsvall | 0–2 | Djurgårdens IF | Sundsvall |
| 15:00 | | Report | Colley 52'; Mushekwi 63' | Stadium: Norrporten Arena; Attendance: 6,510; Referee: Per Melin |

| 29 April 2015 Round 6 | Djurgårdens IF | 3–1 | Falkenbergs FF | Stockholm |
| 19:00 | Mushekwi 67', 73'; Berntsen 77' | Report | Araba 84' | Stadium: Tele2 Arena; Attendance: 9,076; Referee: Jonas Eriksson |

| 3 May 2015 Round 7 | Djurgårdens IF | 5–1 | Gefle IF | Stockholm |
| 17:30 | Arvidsson 6' (pen.); Berntsen 21'; Kevin Walker 40'; Colley 52'; Andersson 68' | Report | Bertilsson 54' | Stadium: Tele2 Arena; Attendance: 11,190; Referee: Glenn Nyberg |

| 11 May 2015 Round 8 | Åtvidabergs FF | 2–3 | Djurgårdens IF | Åtvidaberg |
| 19:00 | Bergström 48'; Owoeri 62' | Report | Berntsen 28'; Mushekwi 64', 85' | Stadium: Kopparvallen; Attendance: 4,346; Referee: Markus Strömbergsson |

| 18 May 2015 Round 9 | Halmstads BK | 2–3 | Djurgårdens IF | Halmstad |
| 19:00 | Barny 48'; Keene 62' | Report | Bergström 14'; Mushekwi 75', 90+2' | Stadium: Örjans Vall; Attendance: 3,855; Referee: Andreas Ekberg |

| 25 May 2015 Round 10 | Djurgårdens IF | 2–2 | AIK | Stockholm |
| 19:00 | Mrabti 54', 83' | Report | Johansson 3'; Bangura 45+1' | Stadium: Tele2 Arena; Attendance: 27,137; Referee: Stefan Johannesson |

| 1 June 2015 Round 11 | IFK Göteborg | 0–0 | Djurgårdens IF | Gothenburg |
| 19:00 | | Report | | Stadium: Gamla Ullevi; Attendance: 14,598; Referee: Martin Strömbergsson |

| 4 June 2015 Round 12 | Djurgårdens IF | 1–1 | IFK Norrköping | Stockholm |
| 19:00 | Johnson 36' | Report | Tkalčić 55' | Stadium: Tele2 Arena; Attendance: 17,902; Referee: Martin Strömbergsson |

| 7 June 2015 Round 13 | Malmö FF | 1–1 | Djurgårdens IF | Malmö |
| 17:30 | Eikrem 53' | Report | Mushekwi 39' | Stadium: Swedbank Stadion; Attendance: 20,648; Referee: Andreas Ekberg |

| 4 July 2015 Round 14 | Djurgårdens IF | 2–0 | Örebro SK | Stockholm |
| 16:00 | Berntsen 5'; Johnson 22' | Report | | Stadium: Tele2 Arena; Attendance: 13,809; Referee: Stefan Johannesson |

| 13 July 2015 Round 15 | Helsingborgs IF | 0–1 | Djurgårdens IF | Helsingborg |
| 19:05 | | Report | Mushekwi 67' | Stadium: Olympia; Attendance: 9,234; Referee: Bojan Pandzic |

| 20 July 2015 Round 16 | Djurgårdens IF | 0–0 | Åtvidabergs FF | Stockholm |
| 19:00 | | Report | | Stadium: Tele2 Arena; Attendance: 13,065; Referee: Jonas Eriksson |

| 27 July 2015 Round 17 | Örebro SK | 0–1 | Djurgårdens IF | Örebro |
| 19:00 | | Report | Arvidsson 77' | Stadium: Behrn Arena; Attendance: 10,770; Referee: Johan Hamlin |

| 1 August 2015 Round 18 | Djurgårdens IF | 2–1 | BK Häcken | Stockholm |
| 16:00 | Johnson 6', 84' | Report | Hemmen 81' | Stadium: Tele2 Arena; Attendance: 13,066; Referee: Kristoffer Karlsson |

| 10 August 2015 Round 19 | AIK | 1–0 | Djurgårdens IF | Solna |
| 19:00 | Bangura 64' | Summary | | Stadium: Friends Arena; Attendance: 39,387; Referee: Markus Strömbergsson |

| 16 August 2015 Round 20 | IF Elfsborg | 2–0 | Djurgårdens IF | Borås |
| 17:30 | Prodell 21', 59' | Summary | | Stadium: Borås Arena; Attendance: 10,396; Referee: Mohammed Al-Hakim |

| 24 August 2015 Round 21 | Djurgårdens IF | 2–2 | Hammarby IF | Stockholm |
| 19:00 | Arvidsson 58' (pen.); Mushekwi 78' | Summary | Torsteinbø 5'; Israelsson 69' | Stadium: Tele2 Arena; Attendance: 27,428; Referee: Markus Strömbergsson |

| 29 August 2015 Round 22 | Djurgårdens IF | 4–2 | Halmstads BK | Stockholm |
| 16:00 | Andersson 24'; Moon 45+4'; Johnson 47'; Berntsen 56' | Report | Rusike 32', 42' | Stadium: Tele2 Arena; Attendance: 12,440; Referee: Michael Lerjéus |

| 14 September 2015 Round 23 | Gefle IF | 2–1 | Djurgårdens IF | Gävle |
| 19:00 | Oremo 5', 13' | Report | Bergström 84' | Stadium: Gavlevallen; Attendance: 5,386; Referee: Mohammed Al-Hakim |

| 20 September 2015 Round 24 | Djurgårdens IF | 0–2 | Malmö FF | Stockholm |
| 15:00 | | Report | Eikrem 68'; Carvalho 83' | Stadium: Tele2 Arena; Attendance: 20,019; Referee: Markus Strömbergsson |

| 23 September 2015 Round 25 | IFK Norrköping | 4–2 | Djurgårdens IF | Norrköping |
| 19:00 | Traustason 21'; Sjölund 55'; Wahlqvist 69'; Kujovic 90' | Report | Andersson 58'; Arvidsson 68' (pen.) | Stadium: Nya Parken; Attendance: 12,322; Referee: Bojan Pandzic |

| 28 September 2015 Round 26 | Djurgårdens IF | 2–2 | Helsingborgs IF | Stockholm |
| 19:00 | Mrabti 20'; Johnson 29' | Report | Prica 40'; Smárason 90+3' | Stadium: Tele2 Arena; Attendance: 8,772; Referee: Andreas Ekberg |

| 4 October 2015 Round 27 | Kalmar FF | 0–3 | Djurgårdens IF | Kalmar |
| 15:00 | | Report | Johnson 31'; Mrabti 52'; Karlström 90+1' | Stadium: Guldfågeln Arena; Attendance: 6,744; Referee: Bojan Pandzic |

| 19 October 2015 Round 28 | Djurgårdens IF | 2–2 | IFK Göteborg | Stockholm |
| 19:00 | Johnson 60'; Walker 84' (pen.) | Report | Engvall 69'; Ankersen 72' | Stadium: Tele2 Arena; Attendance: 14,018; Referee: Mohammed Al-Hakim |

| 24 October 2015 Round 29 | Falkenbergs FF | 0–2 | Djurgårdens IF | Falkenberg |
| 16:00 | | Report | Colley 65'; Anderson 82' | Stadium: Falkenbergs IP; Attendance: 3,373; Referee: Johan Hamlin |

| 31 October 2015 Round 30 | Djurgårdens IF | 4–2 | GIF Sundsvall | Stockholm |
| 13:00 UTC+1 | Anderson 9', 36', 38'; Johnson 52' | Report | Eklund 48'; Chennoufi 81' | Stadium: Tele2 Arena; Attendance: 13,442; Referee: Michael Lerjéus |

=== Svenska Cupen ===
==== 2014–15 ====
The tournament continues from the 2014 season.

Kickoff times are in UTC+1.

===== Group stage =====
| Pos | Team | Pld | W | D | L | GF | GA | GD | Pts | Qualification | IFKN | NIF | DIF | ÄFF |
|---|---|---|---|---|---|---|---|---|---|---|---|---|---|---|
| 1 | IFK Norrköping | 3 | 2 | 0 | 1 | 7 | 3 | +4 | 6 | Advance to Knockout stage | — | — | — | 2–0 |
| 2 | Norrby IF | 3 | 2 | 0 | 1 | 9 | 6 | +3 | 6 | | 0–4 | — | 4–2 | — |
| 3 | Djurgårdens IF | 3 | 1 | 1 | 1 | 5 | 5 | 0 | 4 | | 3–1 | — | — | 0–0 |
| 4 | Ängelholms FF | 3 | 0 | 1 | 2 | 0 | 7 | −7 | 1 | | — | 0–5 | — | — |

Source: svenskfotboll.se (in Swedish)
Rules for classification: 1) Points; 2) Goal difference; 3) Number of goals scored; 4) Head-to-head record; 5) Highest ranked team

| 22 February 2015 Matchday 1 | Djurgårdens IF | 0–0 | Ängelholms FF | Stockholm |
| 14:00 | | Report; Report; Report | | Stadium: Tele2 Arena; Attendance: 6,517; Referee: Per Melin |

| 1 March 2015 Matchday 2 | Norrby IF | 4–2 | Djurgårdens IF | Borås |
| 16:00 | Yarsuvat 14', 60', 87'; Osmanagić 79' | Report; Report | Jawo 17'; Radetinac 63' | Stadium: Borås Arena; Attendance: 505; Referee: Michael Lerjéus |

| 5 March 2015 Matchday 3 | Djurgårdens IF | 3–1 | IFK Norrköping | Stockholm |
| 19:00 | Karlström 6'; Berntsen 15'; Radetinac 27' | Report; Report | Traustason 82' | Stadium: Tele2 Arena; Attendance: 2,381; Referee: Bojan Pandzic |

==== 2015–16 ====
The tournament continues into the 2016 season.

===== Qualification stage =====
| 19 August 2015 Round 2 | Torstorps IF | 1–5 | Djurgårdens IF | Finspång |
| 18:00 UTC+2 | Björhn 44' | Report | Karlström 30'; Kadewere 37'; Bergström 75'; Andersson 83', 86' | Stadium: Atlaslunden; Attendance: 2,528; Referee: Jim Petersson |

== Non competitive ==
=== Pre-season ===
Kickoff times are in UTC+2 unless stated otherwise.

| 20 January 2015 Friendly | UD Las Palmas (Spain) | 3–1 | (Sweden) Djurgårdens IF | (Spain) Las Palmas |
| 12:00 | Figueroa 4', 41'; Momo 56' | Report | Walker 38' | Stadium: Estadio Gran Canaria |

| 24 January 2015 Friendly | IFK Norrköping (Sweden) | 0–0 | (Sweden) Djurgårdens IF | Norrköping |
| 12:30 | | Report | | Stadium: Nya Parken |

| 31 January 2015 Friendly | Åtvidabergs FF (Sweden) | 0–2 | (Sweden) Djurgårdens IF | Åtvidaberg |
| 13:00 | | Report | Radetinac 27'; Andersson 32' | Stadium: Kopparvallen |

| 8 February 2015 Friendly | Djurgårdens IF (Sweden) | 3–1 | (Finland) HJK Helsinki | Stockholm |
| 12:00 | Arvidsson 15'; Walker 67'; Keene 77' | Report | Fukui 19' | Stadium: Tele2 Arena; Attendance: 3,115 |

| 13 February 2015 Friendly | Djurgårdens IF (Sweden) | 3–1 | (China) Shanghai SIPG | Turkey |
| 14:00 | Johnson 2', 72'; Colley 84' | Report | Hysén 87' |

| 17 February 2015 Friendly | Djurgårdens IF (Sweden) | 2–1 | (North Macedonia) FK Vardar | Turkey |
| 14:00 | Mrabti 23', 78' | Report | Miranyan 75' |

| 14 March 2015 Friendly | Djurgårdens IF (Sweden) | 2–0 | (Sweden) Gefle IF | Stockholm |
| 14:00 | Johnson 37'; Karlström 87' | Report | | Stadium: Kaknäs IP |

| 21 March 2015 Friendly | IF Brommapojkarna (Sweden) | 0–3 | (Sweden) Djurgårdens IF | Stockholm |
| 13:00 | | Report | Johnson 13', 48'; Mushekwi 40' | Stadium: Grimsta IP; Attendance: 627 |

| 28 March 2015 Friendly | Djurgårdens IF (Sweden) | 2–0 | (Finland) KuPS | Stockholm |
| 13:30 | Radetinac 89' (pen.); Walker 90' | Report | | Stadium: Lidingövallen |

| 25 June 2015 Friendly | Djurgårdens IF (Sweden) | 3–2 | (Lithuania) FK Trakai | Stockholm |
| | Andersson 21' (pen.); Faltsetas 56'; Broberg 68' | Report | Mamaev 24' (pen.); Kochanauskas 39' | Stadium: Stockholms Stadion; Attendance: 2,600; Referee: Mohammed Al-Hakim |

| 28 June 2015 Friendly | Kalmar FF (Sweden) | 1–0 | (Sweden) Djurgårdens IF | Kalmar |
| | Diouf 42' | Report | | Stadium: Guldfågeln Arena |

| 10 October 2015 Friendly | Levski Sofia (Bulgaria) | 2–2 | (Sweden) Djurgårdens IF | Sofia |
| | Kurdov 48'; Dimitrov 90' | Report | Walker 8'; Stenman 85' | Stadium: Vasil Levski National Stadium |
