= Sam Johnson (footballer, born 1993) =

Liberian footballer

Personal information
- Full name: Sam Garyahzon Johnson
- Date of birth: 6 May 1993 (age 33)
- Place of birth: Monrovia, Liberia
- Height: 1.80 m (5 ft 11 in)
- Position: Forward

Senior career*
Years	Team	Apps	(Gls)
- New Dream FC
- Nimba FC
2011	Assyriska IF	5	(1)
2012	Juventus IF	10	(4)
2012	Härnösands FF	9	(5)
2013–2014	IK Frej	50	(17)
2015–2016	Djurgårdens IF	41	(17)
2016–2017	Wuhan Zall	26	(11)
2018	Vålerenga	21	(11)
2019–2020	Real Salt Lake	34	(10)
2021	Sabah	10	(2)
2021	Mjällby AIF	5	(1)
2022	Aksu	5	(0)
2023	Vasalund	1	(0)
2023	Bodens BK	9	(0)

International career^{‡}
2011	Liberia U23	8	(6)
2015–2019	Liberia	16	(3)
- * Club domestic league appearances and goals as of 17 November 2023 ‡ National team caps and goals as of 23 September 2019 (UTC)

Sam Garyahzon Johnson (born 6 May 1993) is a Liberian professional footballer who plays as a forward. He made 16 appearances for the Liberia national team scoring 3 goals.

== Club career ==
Johnson started out playing for his village team before joining Liberian third division side New Dream FC. With them he scored two goals in a cup game against Liberian Premier League club Nimba FC who were so impressed by his performance that they ended up signing him.

In 2011 Johnson travelled to Norway to trial with FK Haugesund. He impressed the Norwegian club, but only enough for them to offer him a youth contract, so he instead signed with Swedish club Dalkurd FF. He would however only stay there for a couple of months due to work permit problems. Johnson remained in Sweden though and played for fourth tier club Assyriska IF KF during the second half of the 2011 season.

For the first half of the following season Johnson stepped down one division and played for fifth tier club Juventus IF before once again returning to the fourth tier when playing for Härnösands FF during the fall. After the season, he was awarded the title of "best midfielder" in the league Härnösand played in.

Before the 2013 season Johnson trialed with second tier Superettan club Jönköpings Södra IF but was turned down. Instead he signed a three-year deal with third tier club IK Frej. In his second season with them Johnson, who was now playing as forward, became their top goalscorer as the club was promoted to Superettan. In December 2014 Allsvenskan club Djurgårdens IF announced that they had signed Johnson on a four-year deal.

Sam Johnson made his Allsvenskan debut for Djurgården in the 2–1 loss against Elfsborg on 5 April 2015. He got his first Allsvenskan goal in the 2–1 loss against Hammarby on 13 April. After a successful first top flight season where Johnson scored a total of 10 times Djurgården turned down a 22 million SEK bid from French Ligue 1 club Bordeaux the following winter. In the summer of 2016 Johnson was sold for a 30 million SEK.

Then he joined Chinese side Wuhan Zall. He played a crucial part in the club's relegation battle, scoring six goals in 11 appearances and helping the club to finish sixth in China League One. On 14 July 2017 he was removed from the club's first squad.

On 4 February 2019 Real Salt Lake announced that they had signed Johnson to a Designated Player contract. On 31 October 2020, it was announced that Salt Lake and Johnson had mutually agreed to terminate his contract with the club.

Johnson signed with Mjällby AIF in Sweden in August 2021. On 23 April 2022, Mjällby announced his transfer to FC Aksu in Kazakhstan.

== International career ==
Johnson played with the Liberia under-23 team in 2011 for which he scored six goals in eight games.

He made his senior international debut for the Liberia on 14 June 2015, in their 2–1 defeat to Togo.

== Career statistics ==
=== Club ===
As of match played 6 August 2028

Appearances and goals by club, season and competition
Club	Season	League			Cup (Note: Includes the Svenska Cupen, Norwegian Football Cup, and U.S. Open Cup)		Continental		Other (Note: Includes appearances in the Division 1 promotion playoffs, MLS Cup Playoffs, and MLS is Back Tournament)		Total	
Club	Season	Division	Apps	Goals	Apps	Goals	Apps	Goals	Apps	Goals	Apps	Goals
Assyriska IF	2011	Division 2 Södra Svealand	5	1	–		–		–		5	1
Juventus IF	2012	Division 3 Södra Svealand	10	4	–		–		–		10	4
Härnösands FF	2012	Division 2 Norrland	9	5	–		–		–		9	5
IK Frej	2013	Division 1 Norra	25	5	4	1	–		–		29	6
IK Frej	2014	Division 1 Norra	25	12	2	1	–		2	0	29	13
IK Frej	Total		50	17	6	2	0	0	2	0	58	19
Djurgårdens IF	2015	Allsvenskan	29	10	3	0	–		–		32	10
Djurgårdens IF	2016	Allsvenskan	12	7	3	0	–		–		15	7
Djurgårdens IF	Total		41	17	6	0	0	0	0	0	47	17
Wuhan Zall	2016	China League One	11	6	0	0	–		–		11	6
Wuhan Zall	2017	China League One	15	5	0	0	–		–		15	5
Wuhan Zall	Total		26	11	0	0	0	0	0	0	26	11
Vålerenga	2018	Eliteserien	21	11	4	1	–		–		25	12
Real Salt Lake	2019	Major League Soccer	24	9	1	0	–		2	0	27	9
Real Salt Lake	2020	Major League Soccer	7	1	0	0	–		3	0	10	1
Real Salt Lake	Total		31	10	1	0	0	0	5	0	37	10
Sabah	2021	Malaysian Super League	10	2	0	0	–		–		10	2
Mjällby AIF	2021	Allsvenskan	5	1	0	0	–		–		5	1
Mjällby AIF	2022	Allsvenskan	0	0	2	0	–		–		2	0
Mjällby AIF	Total		5	1	2	0	0	0	0	0	7	1
Aksu	2022	Kazakhstan Premier League	5	0	1	0	–		–		6	0
Career total			213	79	20	3	0	0	7	0	240	82

=== International ===
As of 9 September 2019

Appearances and goals by national team and year
National team	Year	Apps	Goals
Liberia	2015	6	0
Liberia	2016	3	1
Liberia	2017	0	0
Liberia	2018	3	1
Liberia	2019	4	1
Total		16	3

Scores and results list Liberia's goal tally first.

No.	Date	Venue	Opponent	Score	Result	Competition
1.	29 March 2016	Antoinette Tubman Stadium, Monrovia, Liberia	Djibouti	2–0	5–0	2017 Africa Cup of Nations qualification
2.	11 October 2018	Stade Alphonse Massemba-Débat, Brazzaville, Congo	Congo	1–1	1–3	2019 Africa Cup of Nations qualification
3.	4 September 2019	SKD Stadium, Monrovia, Liberia	Sierra Leone	3–1	3–1	2022 FIFA World Cup qualification
