= Aslak Falch =

Norwegian footballer (born 1992)

Personal information
- Date of birth: 25 May 1992 (age 34)
- Place of birth: Hundvåg, Norway
- Height: 1.85 m (6 ft 1 in)
- Position: Goalkeeper

Team information
- Current team: Sandnes Ulf
- Number: 1

Youth career
- –2007: Hundvåg
- 2007–2009: Viking

Senior career*
Years	Team	Apps	(Gls)
2009–2011	Viking	1	(0)
2010	→ Vidar (loan)	1	(0)
2012–2014	Sandnes Ulf	16	(0)
2014–2015	Hødd	53	(0)
2016–2017	Vålerenga	13	(0)
2017	Norrköping	0	(0)
2018–2020	Sarpsborg	23	(0)
2020–2024	Sandnes Ulf	85	(0)
2024	Haugesund	1	(0)
2025–	Sandnes Ulf	31	(0)

International career^{‡}
2008	Norway U16	7	(0)
2009	Norway U17	3	(0)
2010	Norway U18	2	(0)
2011	Norway U19	3	(0)
2012	Norway U20	1	(0)
2013–2014	Norway U21	6	(0)
- * Club domestic league appearances and goals as of 14 November 2026 ‡ National team caps and goals as of 4 April 2024

Aslak Falch (born 25 May 1992) is a Norwegian professional footballer who plays for Sandnes Ulf.

== Career ==
Falch was born in Hundvåg, where he also grew up, and played for Hundvåg FK until February 2007, when he joined Viking's youth team. He made his senior debut on 25 October 2009 against Strømsgodset IF, as a substitute when Artur Kotenko was sent off.

After the 2011-season he signed for Sandnes Ulf, and when Bo Andersen in June 2012 announced that he would retire after the season, Sandnes Ulf played with Falch as their first-choice goalkeeper in Tippeligaen for the rest of the season.

In March 2024, Falch signed a one-year contract with Haugesund after injuries in their goalkepper squad.

== Personal life ==
Falch is the grandson of former Norway international defender Edgar Falch.

== Career statistics ==
As of 7 July 2026

Club	Season	League			National cup (Note: Includes Norwegian Cup, Svenska Cupen)		Other		Total	
Club	Season	Division	Apps	Goals	Apps	Goals	Apps	Goals	Apps	Goals
Viking	2009	Tippeligaen	1	0	0	0	—		1	0
Viking	2010	Tippeligaen	0	0	0	0	—		0	0
Viking	2011	Tippeligaen	0	0	0	0	—		0	0
Viking	Total		1	0	0	0	—		1	0
Sandnes Ulf	2012	Tippeligaen	10	0	1	0	—		11	0
Sandnes Ulf	2013	Tippeligaen	6	0	2	0	—		8	0
Sandnes Ulf	Total		16	0	3	0	—		19	0
Hødd	2014	1. divisjon	25	0	0	0	—		25	0
Hødd	2015	1. divisjon	28	0	4	0	1 (Note: Appearances in Eliteserien play-offs)	0	33	0
Hødd	Total		53	0	4	0	1	0	58	0
Vålerenga	2016	Tippeligaen	13	0	4	0	—		17	0
Vålerenga	2017	Eliteserien	0	0	1	0	—		1	0
Vålerenga	Total		13	0	5	0	—		18	0
Norrköping	2017	Allsvenskan	0	0	1	0	—		1	0
Sarpsborg 08	2018	Eliteserien	18	0	0	0	3 (Note: Appearances in UEFA Europa League)	0	21	0
Sarpsborg 08	2019	Eliteserien	2	0	2	0	—		4	0
Sarpsborg 08	2020	Eliteserien	3	0	—		—		3	0
Sarpsborg 08	Total		23	0	2	0	3	0	28	0
Sandnes Ulf	2020	1. divisjon	15	0	0	0	—		15	0
Sandnes Ulf	2021	1. divisjon	28	0	0	0	—		28	0
Sandnes Ulf	2022	1. divisjon	20	0	3	0	1	0	24	0
Sandnes Ulf	2023	1. divisjon	22	0	1	0	—		23	0
Sandnes Ulf	Total		85	0	4	0	1	0	90	0
Haugesund	2024	Eliteserien	1	0	0	0	0	0	1	0
Sandnes Ulf	2025	Norwegian Second Division	25	0	1	0	0	0	26	0
Sandnes Ulf	2026	Norwegian First Division	2	0	0	0	0	0	2	0
Sandnes Ulf	Total		27	0	1	0	0	0	28	0
Career Total			219	0	20	0	5	0	244	0
