= Magnus Lekven =

Norwegian footballer (born 1988)

Personal information
- Date of birth: 13 January 1988 (age 38)
- Place of birth: Porsgrunn, Norway
- Height: 1.77 m (5 ft 9 1/2 in)
- Position: Central midfielder

Youth career
- Gulset (no)

Senior career*
Years	Team	Apps	(Gls)
2005–2012	Odd Grenland	128	(2)
2012–2016	Esbjerg fB	102	(4)
2016–2020	Vålerenga	114	(3)
2021–2022	Odd	31	(0)

International career
2005	Norway U17	8	(0)
2005–2006	Norway U18	14	(2)
2006–2007	Norway U19	11	(1)
2009–2010	Norway U21	10	(0)
2011–2013	Norway U23	2	(0)
2012–2013	Norway	4	(0)
- * Club domestic league appearances and goals

Magnus Lekven (born 13 January 1988) is a Norwegian former professional footballer who played as a midfielder. He is a former Norwegian international.

== Club career ==
Lekven was born in Porsgrunn, and started his career for Odd Grenland where he made his debut when he was 17 years old against Vålerenga.

On 22 August 2012 Lekven signed a deal with Esbjerg fB from 1 January 2013, but a week later the two clubs agreed on a transfer that made it possible for Lekven to move to the Danish club before his contract with Odd Grenland expired.

He played an important part in Esbjerg's good spring season form, that saw them finishing 4th in the Danish Superliga and winning the Danish Cup. In the Danish Cup final Lekven was named the Cup Fighter.

== International career ==
Lekven has several national youth matches, and has represented Norway at every level from U16 to U23. Lekven made his debut for the senior national team when he replaced Ruben Yttergård Jenssen as a substitute in the 85th minute in a 1-1 friendly draw against Denmark on 15 January 2012.

== Career statistics ==
As of 29 May 2022

Club	Season	League			Cup (Note: Includes the Norwegian Football Cup and Danish Cup)		Continental (Note: All appearances in the UEFA Europa League)		Other (Note: Appearance in the Eliteserien play-offs)		Total	
Club	Season	Division	Apps	Goals	Apps	Goals	Apps	Goals	Apps	Goals	Apps	Goals
Odd Grenland	2005	Tippeligaen	1	0	0	0	–		–		1	0
Odd Grenland	2006	Tippeligaen	6	0	0	0	–		1	0	6	0
Odd Grenland	2007	Tippeligaen	7	0	1	0	–		0	0	8	0
Odd Grenland	2008	Adeccoligaen	14	1	1	0	–		–		15	1
Odd Grenland	2009	Tippeligaen	29	1	5	1	–		–		34	2
Odd Grenland	2010	Tippeligaen	29	0	5	0	–		–		34	0
Odd Grenland	2011	Tippeligaen	30	0	3	0	–		–		33	0
Odd Grenland	2012	Tippeligaen	12	0	2	0	–		–		14	0
Odd Grenland	Total		128	2	17	1	0	0	1	0	146	3
Esbjerg fB	2012–13	Superliga	23	1	4	0	–		–		27	1
Esbjerg fB	2013–14	Superliga	23	0	0	0	7	0	–		30	0
Esbjerg fB	2014–15	Superliga	27	1	3	0	4	0	–		34	1
Esbjerg fB	2015–16	Superliga	27	2	0	0	–		–		27	2
Esbjerg fB	2016–17	Superliga	2	0	0	0	–		0	0	2	0
Esbjerg fB	Total		102	4	7	0	11	0	0	0	120	4
Vålerenga	2016	Tippeligaen	10	0	0	0	–		–		10	0
Vålerenga	2017	Eliteserien	26	2	0	0	–		–		26	2
Vålerenga	2018	Eliteserien	20	1	2	0	–		–		22	1
Vålerenga	2019	Eliteserien	30	0	1	0	–		–		31	0
Vålerenga	2020	Eliteserien	28	0	0	0	–		–		28	0
Vålerenga	Total		114	3	3	0	0	0	0	0	117	3
Odd	2021	Eliteserien	25	0	2	0	–		–		27	0
Odd	2022	Eliteserien	5	0	0	0	–		–		5	0
Odd	Total		30	0	2	0	0	0	0	0	32	0
Career total			375	9	29	1	11	0	1	0	416	10

== Honours ==
Esbjerg fB

- Danish Cup: 2012–13
