= Ernest Agyiri =

Ghanaian footballer (born 1998)

Personal information
- Full name: Ernest Agyiri
- Date of birth: 6 March 1998 (age 28)
- Place of birth: Accra, Ghana
- Height: 1.76 m (5 ft 9 in)
- Position: Left winger

Team information
- Current team: Randers
- Number: 21

Youth career
- 2008–2014: Right to Dream

Senior career*
Years	Team	Apps	(Gls)
2015–2020	Manchester City	0	(0)
2016–2018	→ Vålerenga (loan)	12	(0)
2016–2018	→ Vålerenga 2 (loan)	14	(4)
2018–2019	→ Tubize (loan)	18	(3)
2019–2020	→ Enosis Neon (loan)	19	(3)
2021–2023	Levadia	66	(20)
2023–	Randers	22	(1)
2024	→ Kolding (loan)	2	(0)
2025	→ Levadia (loan)	28	(10)

International career
- Ghana U17
- * Club domestic league appearances and goals as of 17 November 2025

Ernest Agyiri (born 6 March 1998) is a Ghanaian professional footballer who plays as a left winger for Danish Superliga club Randers FC.

== Club career ==
=== Early career ===
Agyiri won a scholarship to the Right to Dream Academy in 2008, moving to Manchester City at the beginning of 2015. On 31 August 2016, Agyiri was loaned to Vålerenga, by Manchester City.

On 30 August 2018, Agyiri joined Belgian side Tubize on loan.

In July 2020, Agyiri was released by Manchester City, after five years associated with the club.

=== FCI Levadia ===
On 29 January 2021, Agyiri signed a two-year contract with Estonian club FCI Levadia. He made his debut in the Meistriliiga on 13 March 2021, scoring two goals in a 5–0 win against Vaprus.

=== Randers FC ===
On 2 August 2023 Danish Superliga club Randers FC confirmed, that Agyiri had joined the club on a deal until June 2026.

Agyiri did not get much playing time at the beginning of the 2024–25 season, which is why he was loaned out to Danish 1st Division side Kolding IF on 2 September 2024 until the end of the year. During the loan spell, Agyiri only performed three times and returned to Randers at the end of the year.

On 3 February 2025 Agyiri joined his former club, Estonian Meistriliiga side FCI Levadia Tallinn, on a loan deal for the rest of 2025. After nearly 10 months at the club, where he recorded 11 goals in 37 appearances across all competitions, Agyiri returned to Randers FC at the end of 2025.

== Career statistics ==
=== Club ===
As of match played 18 April 2018

Appearances and goals by club, season and competition
Club	Season	League			National Cup		Continental		Total	
Club	Season	Division	Apps	Goals	Apps	Goals	Apps	Goals	Apps	Goals
Vålerenga	2016	Eliteserien	1	0	1	0	-		2	0
Vålerenga	2017	Eliteserien	6	0	2	0	-		8	0
Vålerenga	2018	Eliteserien	5	0	1	0	-		6	0
Vålerenga	Total		12	0	4	0	-	-	16	0
Career total			12	0	4	0	-	-	16	0

== Honours ==
Individual

- Meistriliiga Player of the Month: April 2023,
- Meistriliiga Goal of the Month: May 2022,
- Meistriliiga Goal of the Year: 2022
