= 2015–16 Esbjerg fB season =

91st season in existence of Esbjerg fB

Esbjerg fB
2015–16 season
- Chairman: Leif T. Thomsen
- Head coach: Niels Frederiksen (until 10 August 2015); Michael Pedersen (interim, from 11 August to 20 October 2015); Jonas Dal (from 21 October 2015)
- Stadium: Blue Water Arena
- Danish Superliga: 11th
- Danish Cup: Third round
- Top goalscorer: League: Kevin Mensah & Mick van Buren (6); All: Mick van Buren (8)
Home colours	Away colours

The 2015–16 Esbjerg fB season was the teams' 91st football season since formation. They ended 11th in the Danish Superliga and were knocked out in the third round of DBU Pokalen.

== Competitions ==
=== Overall record ===
Esbjerg's playing record this campaign was 8 wins, 9 draws and 18 losses for an overall win rate of 22.86%.

Competition	First match	Last match	Starting round	Final position	Record							
Competition	First match	Last match	Starting round	Final position	Pld	W	D	L	GF	GA	GD	Win %
Danish Superliga	5 August 2022	28 May 2023	Matchday 1	11th	33	7	9	17	38	64	−26	21.21
Danish Cup	1 September 2015	24 September 2015	Second round	Third round	2	1	0	1	9	1	+8	50.00
Total					35	8	9	18	47	65	−18	22.86

Source: SuperStats

=== Danish Superliga ===
==== League table ====
Pos	Team	Pld	W	D	L	GF	GA	GD	Pts	Qualification or relegation
8	Viborg	33	11	7	15	34	42	−8	40	
9	Nordsjælland	33	11	5	17	35	51	−16	38	
10	AGF	33	8	13	12	47	49	−2	37	
11	Esbjerg	33	7	9	17	38	64	−26	30	
12	Hobro (R)	33	4	6	23	26	70	−44	18	Relegation to the Danish 1st Division

Source: DBU, Soccerway
Rules for classification: 1) Points; 2) Goal difference; 3) Goals scored; 4) Head-to-head points; 5) Head-to-head goal difference; 6) Head-to-head goals scored; 7) Head-to-head away goals scored; 8) Play-off on neutral ground (only if rankings are important for medals, teams for relegation or teams for UEFA competitions); 9) Draw.
(R) Relegated

== Danish Superliga ==
20 July 2015 Match 1	AaB	1–1	Esbjerg fB	Aalborg
19:00	Würtz (yellow card) 37'; Abildgaard 47'; Blåbjerg (yellow card) 76'	Summary	van Buren 12' (pen.); Laursen (yellow card) 70'; Lekven (yellow card) 78'	Stadium: Nordjyske Arena; Attendance: 7,764; Referee: (Denmark) Michael Tykgaard
