= Mikkel Agger =

Danish footballer (born 1992)

Personal information
- Full name: Mikkel Agger
- Date of birth: 1 November 1992 (age 34)
- Place of birth: Lemvig, Denmark
- Height: 1.79 m (5 ft 10 in)
- Position: Striker

Youth career
- Lemvig GF

Senior career*
Years	Team	Apps	(Gls)
2009–2011	Thisted	11	(8)
2011–2014	Esbjerg	28	(5)
2012–2013	→ Hjørring (loan)	12	(3)
2013–2014	→ Horsens (loan)	14	(1)
2014–2017	Thisted	53	(26)
2018–2019	Sarpsborg 08	22	(3)
2019–2020	Viborg	43	(14)
2020–2021	Vendsyssel	22	(7)
2021–2024	Thisted	64	(27)

International career
2011	Denmark U19	2	(0)
2012	Denmark U20	3	(2)
- * Club domestic league appearances and goals

Mikkel Agger (born 1 November 1992) is a Danish retired professional footballer.

== Club career ==
=== Thisted ===
Coming through the youth ranks of Thisted FC playing in the Danish 1st Division, he signed a professional contract with the club on his birthday in 2009. Following some impressive displays for Thisted in the 2010–11 season, he went on trials with Danish Superliga clubs AaB and Esbjerg fB. Agger did not get a contract at AaB, but Esbjerg were keen on signing the striker.

=== Esbjerg ===
On 3 August 2011, Agger signed a four-year contract with Esbjerg fB. Agger made his debut only three days after joining the club. He was in the starting lineup against FC Sydvest 05 in a Danish Cup game, but had to leave the pitch after only 30 minutes due to an ankle injury.

After returning from his loan spell at FC Hjørring, Agger became the fourth choice in attack. On 27 June 2014, his contract was terminated.

In the summer transfer window of 2012, Esbjerg fB loaned Kenneth Fabricius from SønderjyskE and therefore, Agger became surplus. A half-season loan deal to FC Hjørring was announced on 13 August 2012.

Agger would be loaned out again, this time to AC Horsens on a season-long deal in September 2013.

=== Return to Thisted ===
A month after leaving Esbjerg, Agger signed a two-year deal with his former club Thisted FC. He scored 25 league goals in his first season, making him the top goalscorer of the team that season. After his successful season, Agger aroused interest from foreign clubs, notably German club FC St. Pauli. Agger, however, chose to stay at Thisted, and extended his contract by another two years in May 2016.

=== Viborg ===
On 31 January 2019, Viborg FF announced the signing of Agger from Norwegian club Sarpsborg 08 FF.

=== Third return to Thisted ===
After a season at Vendsyssel FF, Agger once again returned to Thisted FC, signing with the club on 22 June 2021.

On June 5, 2024, 31-year-old Agger confirmed that he was ending his football career. His decision to retire was made so that he could spend time with his son who suffered from an rare genetic disease.

== Personal life ==
Mikkel is the older brother of professional footballer Mads Agger. Their father, Søren Agger, also spent time in professional football for Herning Fremad.
