= Kaknäs IP =

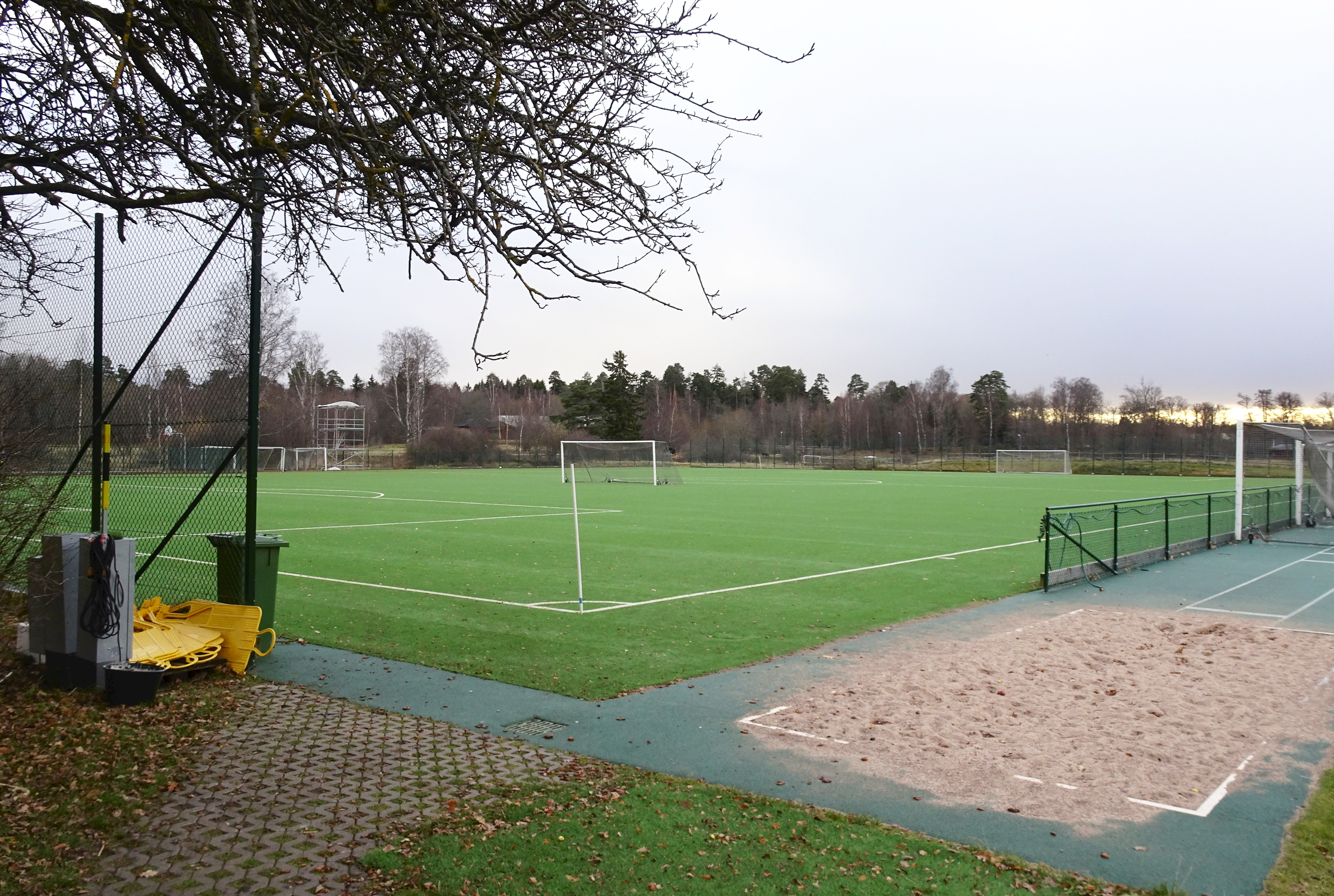
- Kaknäs IP, 2016
- Interactive map of Kaknäs IP
- Location: Djurgården
- Coordinates: 59.33427°N 18.13499°E
- Type: Sports facility

Kaknäs IP is the training ground of Djurgårdens IF. It houses two full-size pitches, one with grass and one with artificial grass.
