= Anders Nedrebø =

Norwegian footballer (born 1988)

Personal information
- Full name: Anders Emil Nedrebø
- Date of birth: 19 August 1988 (age 38)
- Place of birth: Norway
- Height: 5 ft 11 in (1.80 m)
- Position: Right back

Youth career
- Helset
- Hauger

Senior career*
Years	Team	Apps	(Gls)
2007–2010	Bærum		
2011	Asker	29	(6)
2012–2013	HamKam	51	(7)
2014–2015	Bærum	54	(5)
2016	Vålerenga	5	(0)
- * Club domestic league appearances and goals as of 4 September 2016

Anders Emil Nedrebø (born 19 August 1988) is a retired Norwegian footballer who played as a defender. His last club was Vålerenga which he left ahead of the 2017 season.

== Career statistics ==
As of 4 November 2016

Season	Club	Division	League		Cup		Total	
Season	Club	Division	Apps	Goals	Apps	Goals	Apps	Goals
2011	Asker	1. divisjon	29	6	2	0	31	6
2012	HamKam	1. divisjon	24	5	3	3	27	8
2013	HamKam	1. divisjon	27	2	2	0	29	2
2014	Bærum	1. divisjon	27	3	0	0	27	3
2015	Bærum	1. divisjon	27	2	1	0	28	2
2016	Vålerenga	Tippeligaen	5	0	2	0	7	0
Career Total			139	18	10	3	149	21
