= Robert Lundström =

Swedish footballer

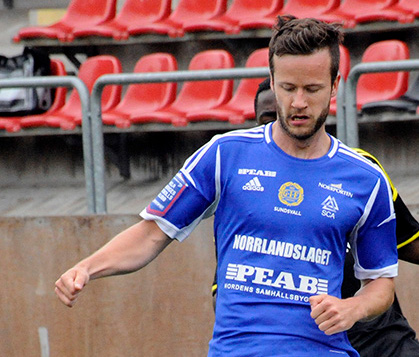

Personal information
- Date of birth: 1 November 1989 (age 37)
- Place of birth: Sundsvall, Sweden
- Height: 1.82 m (6 ft 0 in)
- Position: Wing-back

Team information
- Current team: Ariana
- Number: 19

Youth career
- Kubikenborgs IF

Senior career*
Years	Team	Apps	(Gls)
2008	Medskogsbrons BK	12	(11)
2009–2014	GIF Sundsvall	75	(5)
2015–2017	Vålerenga	57	(1)
2018–2020	AIK	33	(1)
2021–2023	GIF Sundsvall	74	(4)
2024–	Ariana	8	(0)
- * Club domestic league appearances and goals as of 1 August 2024

Robert Lundström (born 1 November 1989) is a Swedish footballer who plays for Ettan Södra club Ariana.

== Honours ==
AIK

- Allsvenskan: 2018
