= Johan Casper Printz =

Royal Swedish Navy officer (1671–1746)

- Born: 1671; Stettin, Swedish Pomerania
- Died: 22 December 1746 (aged 74–75); Ljungbyholm, Kalmar
- Spouse: Katarina Engelbrektsson (m. 1701)
- Military career
- Allegiance: Sweden
- Branch: Swedish Navy
- Service years: 1698–1746
- Rank: Schoutbynacht
- Commands: Töva Litet (1701); Wasa (1701); Falken (1703); Phoenix (1708); Vita Örn (1711); Karlskrona (1686); Göta Lejon (1702)
- Conflicts: Great Northern War: Arkhangelsk (1701); Danzig Bay (1709); Møn (1710); Køge Bay (1710); Hanö (1712); Bornholm (1712); Møn (1712); Rügen (1712); Rügen (1713); Dornbusch (1715); Langeland (1715); Fehmarn (1715)

Johan Casper Printz (1671 – 22 December 1746) (Note: All dates follow the Gregorian calendar, which was 10 days ahead of the Swedish calendar and 11 days ahead of the Julian calendar; Sweden used its own style from 1 March 1700 to 30 February 1712, and the Julian calendar from 1 March 1712 to 17 February 1753.) was a Swedish Navy officer who gained renown as a frigate captain in the Great Northern War, most notably as commander of Vita Örn from 1712 to 1715.

Printz, born in the Swedish city of Stettin (Szczecin), entered military service in 1698. Three years later, he married Katarina Engelbrektsson in Karlskrona. Printz fought Denmark–Norway and Russia in the early campaigns of the Great Northern War, earning him the rank of överlöjtnant, before briefly entering Dutch service from 1707 to 1708. He fought as a frigate commander in all major Swedish naval operations on the Southern Baltic front from 1709 to April 1715, including Køge (1710) and Rügen (1712). In the latter, he battled the promising Danish–Norwegian officer Peter Wessel.

Printz found the most success on cruising missions, notably as commander of the excellent frigate Vita Örn. He captured numerous prizes and won three frigate single-ship actions, most famously against Hejren on 8 September 1712, earning him a captain's rank. He was captured by the Danes off Fehmarn in April 1715, though subsequently promoted to commodore. After his release in July 1719, Printz fought as a ship of the line commander against the Russian Baltic Fleet until the end of the war. In 1741, following a protracted legal dispute against the Admiralty Board, he was promoted to schoutbynacht. Printz died five years later in Ljungbyholm, Kalmar, Sweden.

== Personal life ==
Johan Casper Printz was born in Stettin (Szczecin) in 1671, then part of Swedish Pomerania. In a biographical sketch, author Ernst Holmberg (1864–1940) suggested he was of Dutch descent. Printz entered military service in 1698, and fought in the Great Northern War (1700–1721) as a Swedish Navy officer. In 1701, he married Katarina Engelbrektsson/Engelbrechten (circa 1677–1749) in the German Parish of Karlskrona, where she was born. As a result of the Battle of Fehmarn in 1715, Printz became a Danish prisoner of war in Glückstadt, where the Swedes endured particularly harsh captivity. He returned to Sweden following a prisoner exchange in July 1719, and died on 22 December 1746 in Ljungbyholm, Kalmar.

== Military career ==
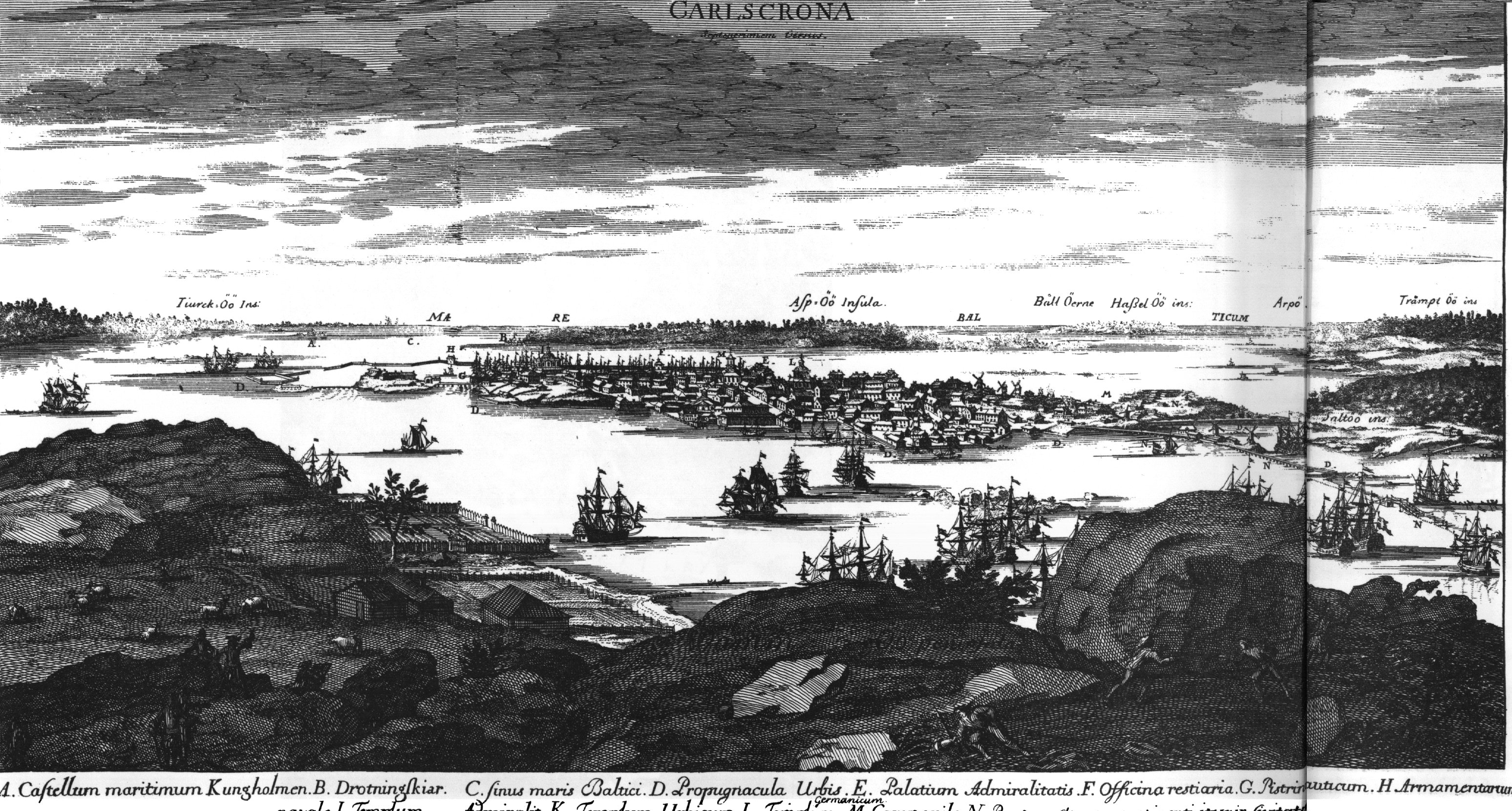
Karlskrona (circa 1700), Printz's main base of operations during the Great Northern War

During the Great Northern War, Printz became an extra ordinarie överlöjtnant (roughly equivalent to a supernumerary first lieutenant) in the Admiralty Board of Sweden on 11 July 1700. He was promoted to överlöjtnant on 18 December that same year—commissioned on 21 February 1707. He was permitted to temporarily enter Dutch naval service from 1707 to 1708, as it was involved in the War of the Spanish Succession (1701–1714) against France. Back in Sweden, Printz became an extra ordinarie captain on 23 September 1709—commissioned to captain on 2 January 1713. Following many years as a successful frigate captain, he was promoted to commodore on 17 August 1715 whilst in Danish captivity. After his release in 1719, Printz fought in the concluding years of the war.

=== Admiralty Board legal dispute ===
In the Diet of [February] 1739, Printz turned to the Estates of the Realm with complaints against the Admiralty Board for having unfairly bypassed him for a vacant schoutbynacht position. Following subsequent legal disputes, the issue was brought before the Chancellor of Justice who, however, dropped the investigation against the Admiralty for lack of sufficient legal grounds. Having reviewed the inquiry, the Committee on Justice presented a resolution in the Diet of [August] 1741 to pursue the promotion without initiating further legal proceedings. After the reading of Printz's memorial—serving as evidence of his long and faithful service—the Estates resolved to petition the King for his promotion while still demanding that the Chancellor of Justice resume the case against the Admiralty. Printz was finally promoted to schoutbynacht (roughly equivalent to rear admiral) on 28 October that same year.

== Service in the Great Northern War ==
=== Early campaigns ===
Printz participated in the Swedish naval expedition of 1700, which compelled Denmark–Norway to sue for peace. In the Expedition to Arkhangelsk the following year, he served on board the 40-gun frigate Älvsborg (1700) under Captain Erik Strobill. On their arrival in July, a detachment of 120 men, one snow, two galiots, and three sloops was organised to capture a fortification protecting the Arkhangelsk port; Printz, commanding the 4-gun galiot Töva Litet (1701) in the botched attack, rescued the crew of the grounded snow and the second galiot. He later led sloops in coastal raids on the voyage home, as the Swedes sought to redeem the failed expedition. Printz received command of the stores ship Wasa (1701) in 1703, and was in Dutch service from 1707 to 1708.

=== 1709 ===
Southern Baltic Sea, Printz's theatre of war from 1709 to 1715

Printz gained command of the 28-gun frigate Falken (1703) towards the end of the year, operating out of the Karlskrona Naval Base. During a cruising mission to Bornholm, he learned of the Danish 20-gun-armed frigate Maagen (1694) under Johan Wibe—Denmark had reentered the war following Sweden's crushing defeat at Poltava earlier that year. As Printz pursued eastwards, a sudden storm forced the two ships into the Bay of Danzig (Gdańsk), prompting an encounter off Pillau (Baltiysk) on 12 December. After four hours of combat, the fleeing Danish crew beached their battered frigate near Putzig (Puck) and blew it up to prevent its capture.

=== 1710 ===
Printz was given command of the 34-gun frigate Phoenix (1708) early in the year. As part of Jacob De Prou's squadron convoying supply ships from Stralsund, Printz was detached on 27 May to reconnoitre between Møn and Rügen alongside the 56-gun ship of the line Wachtmeister (1681). Over the following days, after chasing off two Danish frigates and a snow, Wachtmeister seized a galiot by a ruse while Printz attacked a distant group of 12 merchantmen and another galiot. He managed to capture all ships but six, (Note: In total, Wachtmeister and Phoenix brought 13 Danish vessels back to Karlskrona to a value of 8,660 rigsdaler, and over 100 prisoners of war.) of which he sank three, before six Danish frigates arrived to repel him. Printz later participated in the naval expedition to Køge under Admiral-General Hans Wachtmeister (1642–1714), which culminated in the inconclusive Battle of Køge Bay on 4 October. In the following days, up to 39 empty transport ships—returning from Danzig without a planned Russian invasion force—were captured or destroyed by Wachtmeister's cruisers.

=== 1711 ===
By 1711, a severe plague had struck southern Scandinavia and would hamper any major operations for the year. In May, Printz was part of Hans Husman's squadron, cruising the eastern coast of Scania to prevent Danish amphibious raids. Towards the end of June, he was ordered to escort Michel Bluhm to Swedish Pomerania to oversee its coastal defences. As Sweden's enemies subsequently invaded the province and besieged Stralsund, the fleet shipped over 4,000 Swedish troops in December.

=== 1712 ===
Early in the year, Printz was entrusted with command of the innovative 30-gun frigate Vita Örn (1711). (Note: Vita Örn—also spelled as Hwita Örn or Hvijta Örnen at the time (White Eagle in English)—combined excellent sailing and fighting capabilities; it carried a 12-pounder battery on one deck only, which was unusual for a frigate of that size (525 tonnes).) In late May, during a reconnaissance ahead of Magnus Stenbock's seaborne expedition to Rügen, Printz confronted Christian von Güntelberg's 30-gun frigate Høyenhald (1708) off Hanö; the Danish ship withdrew to Copenhagen for repairs after having lost its foremast in the ensuing firefight. Vita Örn was part of Admiral-General Wachtmeister's main fleet, which departed Karlskrona on 3 September to intercept Ulrik Christian Gyldenløve's Danish counterpart and pave the way for Stenbock's transports. The following day, the Swedes spotted his outnumbered fleet off Bornholm and drove it into the Sound, (Note: According to Wachtmeister, only four or five of the smallest and best sailing Swedish ships were able to catch up with the Danes—these possibly included Vita Örn, regarded as the finest sailing Swedish ship at the time. At 18:00, they encountered the ships of the line Tumleren and, after receiving support, also Prins Christian and Island, which checked their attack.) achieving naval supremacy.

Action of 8 September 1712 off Møn between Vita Örn (right) and Hejren

On 8 September, Vita Örn, being detached from the main fleet, encountered the Danish 28-gun-armed frigate Hejren (1683) under Jens Rosenpalm off Møn; the two ships were each considered the finest sailer in their respective navies at the time. After a two-and-a-half-hour chase, Printz caught up with the fleeing ship in Præstø Fjord and sank it after an hour of fierce fighting. Rosenpalm and 80 of his 120 men were captured, of whom 32 were wounded—the rest went down with the ship. Printz, with four men killed and nine wounded of his own, returned to Karlskrona for repairs. (Note: According to the Danish General Staff—citing Oscar Fredrik's work and Wachtmeister's report—Hejren lost three killed and seven wounded after an hour of fighting before reaching Præstø Fjord, where it was finally sunk; six light Danish guns were salvaged by the Swedes, who captured 80 Danes, including 30 wounded; the Swedes lost four men killed and seven wounded of their own. However, this version conflicts with Oscar Fredrik's work—in which Wachtmeister's report is presented—where the three killed and four wounded Danes were lost in previous skirmishes against Stenbock's escort, while no salvaged guns are mentioned; instead, Hejren was pursued for two and a half hours before reaching the fjord, where it was sunk with all its belongings; aside from killed, the Swedes and the Danes lost nine and 32 men severely wounded, respectively.) Meanwhile, Admiral-General Wachtmeister lifted the blockade of the Sound to directly convoy the transports to Rügen, fearing Danish cruisers.

On 26 September, Printz, who had since returned to observe Gyldenløve's fleet, arrived to inform the Admiral-General that it was inbound. The two fleets sighted each other off Rügen the next day. Favourable winds allowed Gyldenløve to outmanoeuvre Wachtmeister and, on 29 September, attack the exposed disembarking transports with five frigates and several smaller ships. Printz was among the first to intervene, engaging the two foremost frigates, the 20-gun Sorte Ørn (1694) and the 18-gun Løvendals Galley (1711) under Friderich von Rehdern and Peter Wessel (later Tordenskjold), respectively. The Danish frigates withdrew once Vita Örn came within pistol-shot distance. Løvendals Galley lost its foremast in the action and was unable to fight the next day.

Battle of Rügen in 1712. The Danish attack is seen in the lower right corner

Overall, however, the Danish attack proved successful, having destroyed or captured many of the Swedish transports. (Note: These included provisions and materiel, a lack of which restricted Stenbock's freedom of action in his German campaign. His troops, on the other hand, landed with no losses.) The two main fleets returned to port after a brief encounter on 30 September. A second Swedish convoy was being prepared, which included Vita Örn, but it faced delays due to disease as well as a lack of funds and transports. Once it finally launched in December following Stenbock's victory at Gadebusch, headgales prevented it from delivering the 3,000 embarked troops and supplies to him.

=== 1713 ===
In early March, Printz, on board Vita Örn, led the 40-gun frigate Viborg (1707) and the 20-gun frigate Postiljon (1701) to escort grain ships to Stralsund and disrupt the Danish lines of communication. In mid-March, his squadron attacked a small Danish convoy off Rügen en route to relieve Christian Thomsen Carl's squadron in the Bay of Greifswald; the convoy withdrew to Grønsund after its two escorting frigates, Svenske Sophie (1702) and Høyenhald, were dispersed and a supply ship captured, though it was later retaken. Printz spent many of the remaining months on cruising missions as part of a larger fleet or convoying transports to and from Stralsund; some 800 Swedish reinforcements arrived at the city in October.

=== 1714 ===
Early in the year, Vita Örn lay in wait in the Bay of Wismar along with Phoenix and Postiljon to ambush enemy ships going through the Bay of Lübeck. From the end of March, Printz sailed with Carl Gustav Ulrich's squadron to guard the Swedish coastline and prevent the Russian fleet from acquiring warships from Arkhangelsk or the Maritime Powers. He spent the time from June to October on cruising missions, or convoying transports to Sweden's German dominions as part of a larger fleet. On 22 November, Charles XII of Sweden suddenly arrived at Stralsund from his five-year-long exile in the Ottoman Empire—Vita Örn and Postiljon were the only Swedish warships still at sea by then. Printz closed the year with a shipbuilding delivery to the Swedish Stralsund squadron on 19 December. He returned to Karlskrona ten days later after Vita Örn was badly damaged by ice.

=== 1715 ===
In April, Printz, who was conveying ammunition to Stralsund, received orders to rendezvous with Count Carl Hans Wachtmeister (1689–1736), whose squadron would operate near Fehmarn. (Note: On 4 April, Count Wachtmeister set sail with orders from the Admiralty Board to cruise south of the Sound to seize warships bound for the Russian fleet, prevent trade to occupied Swedish ports, and secure communications with Pomerania and Wismar. On 10 April, he received orders from Charles XII to sail into the Fehmarn Belt in conjunction with a squadron from Gothenburg—which, however, failed to arrive in time. The aim was to conduct coastal raids and disrupt the supply lines to Holstein, where the Danish Army was mustering for an attack on Stralsund.) On his way, Printz was driven back east on 7 April by several Danish frigates off Travemünde. He burned the grounded galiot Dorothea off Klütz the next day, before three frigates arrived in a futile pursuit of him. On 12 April, Printz counterattacked the now-isolated 24-gun-armed frigate Sorte Ørn off Dornbusch, (Note: According to Gyllengranat, Printz was ordered to cruise off Dornbusch before the encounter with Sorte Ørn, which suggests that he rendezvoused with Wachtmeister sometime between 9 and 12 April. Furthermore, he wrote that the combat lasted for two and a half hours and that Sorte Ørn carried 30 guns.) which struck its colours after three Swedish broadsides; over 73 men were captured, including the wounded Captain von Rehdern, while the battered prize was towed to Wismar. The Danes claimed to have lost two, or eight to nine men killed, and the Swedes one.

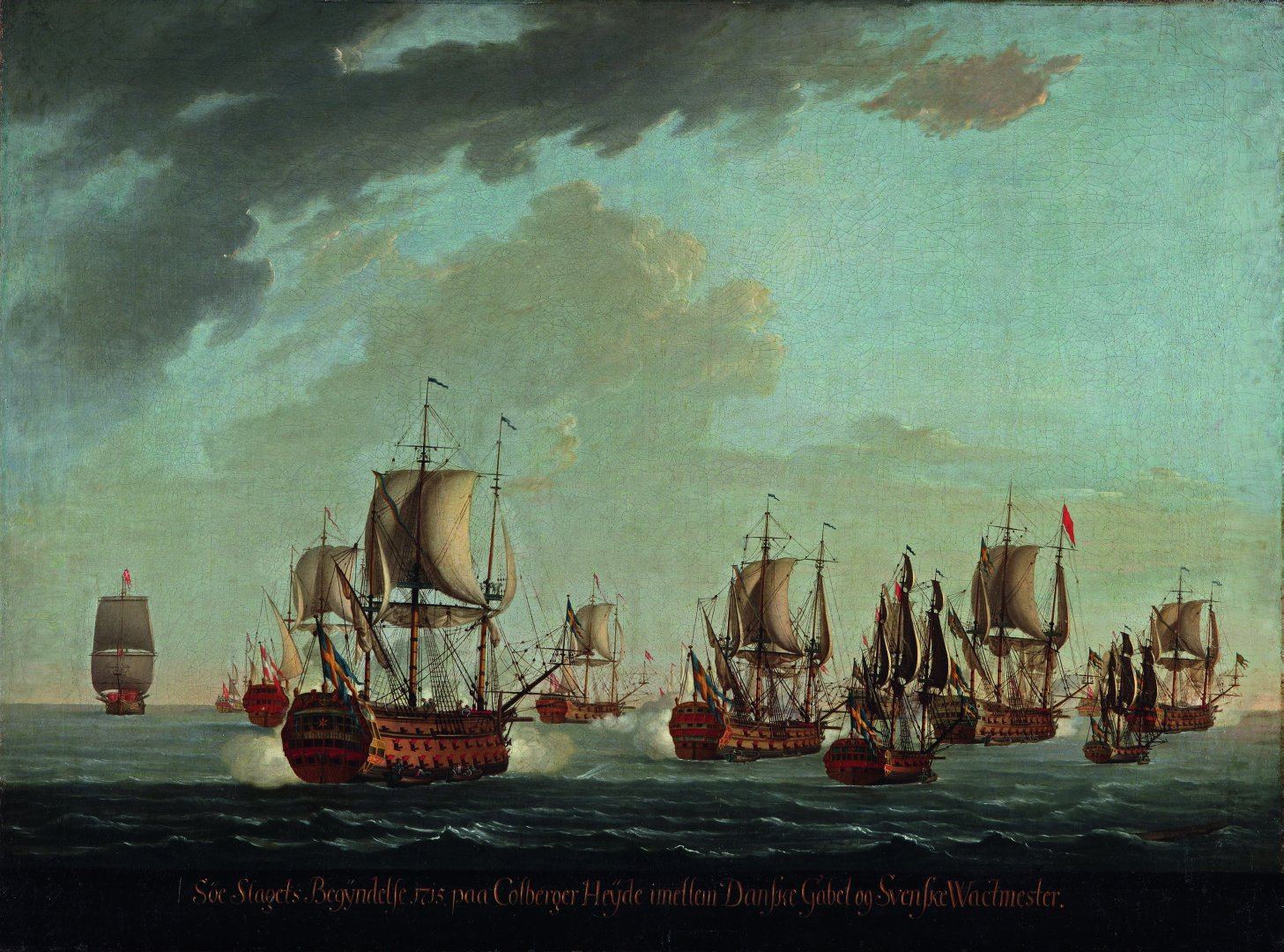
Battle of Fehmarn; Vita Örn fought from the rear, on the right

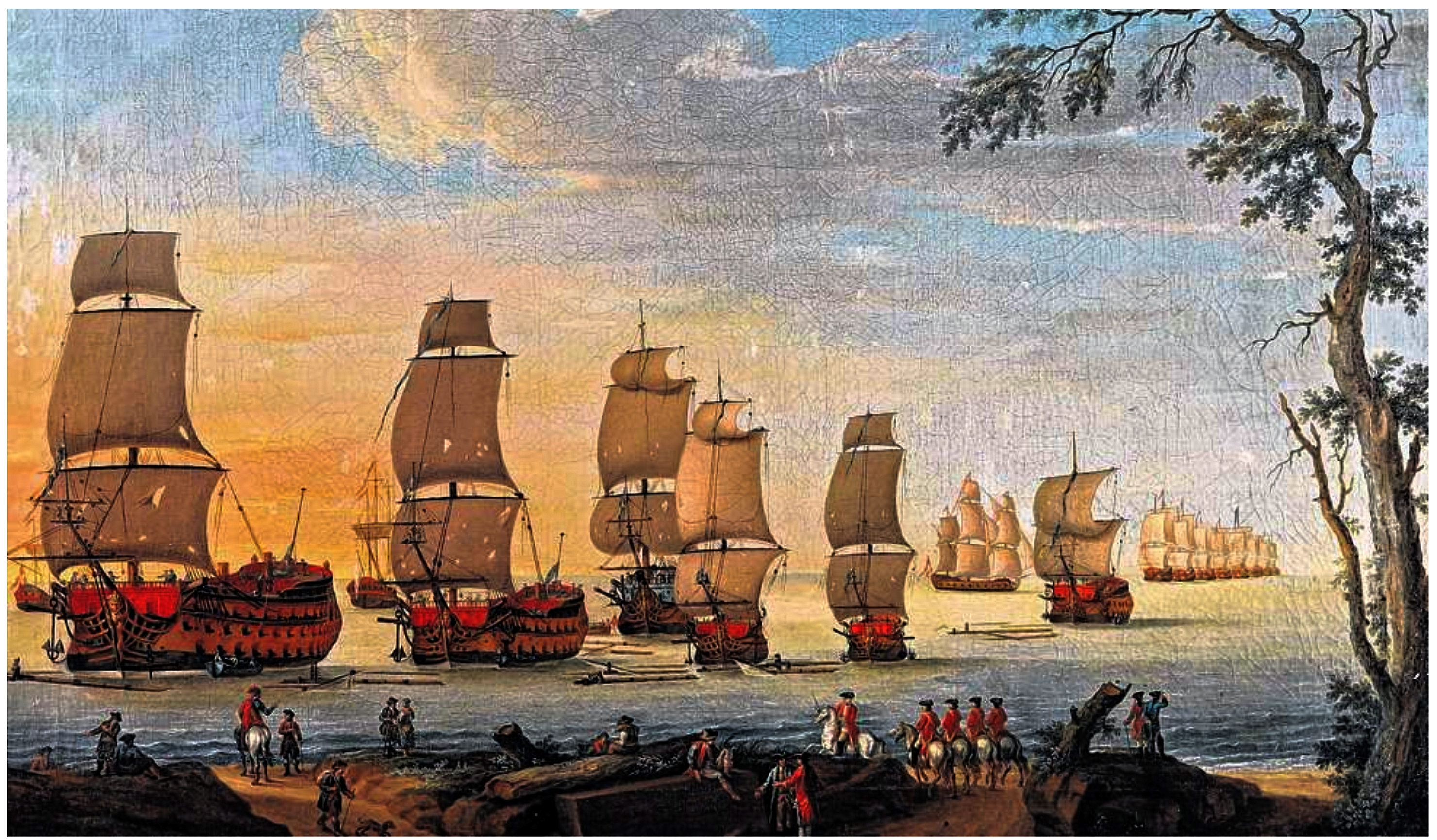
Grounded Swedish ships in the days following the battle

On 13 April, Count Wachtmeister's ships arrived and drove the two other frigates into Travemünde before conducting raids along the Wagrian and the Fehmarn coasts, capturing and burning several vessels. Once in the Bay of Kiel, Vita Örn and the 50-gun ship of the line Göteborg (1696) captured the Royal Danish merchantmen St. Paul and Hercules (Note: St. Paul was retaken around 22 April, and Hercules burned by the Swedes ahead of the Battle of Fehmarn; a total of nine ships were captured by the Swedes in the Fehmarn Belt, of which some were sent to Wismar.) off Langeland on 20 April; a third ship, the Gekrönte Liebe, escaped after defending itself. Meanwhile, Christian Carl Gabel gathered eight ships of the line and three frigates south of Fehmarn Belt to intercept Wachtmeister.

On 24 April at 16:00, the two squadrons clashed off Fehmarn. Printz was positioned behind the right wing of the main Swedish line, consisting of four ships of the line, with the other frigate deployed to his left. As the two main lines engaged, Gabel sent the frigate Løvendals Galley around the Swedes at 17:00 in search of Vita Örn, but to no avail. After a hard-fought battle, the combatants separated at 21:30. At night near Bülk, Count Wachtmeister began scuttling all his ships except the still-seaworthy Vita Örn, which he ordered to escape through the Great Belt at 04:30.

After slipping through the first Danish line, Printz was cut off and forced back whence he came by Løvendals Galley and the 30-gun frigate Raae (1709); also Høyenhald joined in the pursuit, which ended at 09:30 as Printz beached his ship next to his comrades. (Note: Wachtmeister claimed that it was Printz's own crew that forced him to run Vita Örn aground; this garnered support from Gyllengranat who identified them as 150 Saxons.) The Danish frigates compelled Wachtmeister to cease the scuttling and surrender at 12:30. Save for the irreparable flagship, Prinsessan Hedvig Sofia (1692), the Danes captured all Swedish ships and over 1,875 men in total, including Printz. Some 353 Swedes were killed and wounded in the battle against 292 Danes. Peter Wessel, having spearheaded the pursuit of Vita Örn in the breakout attempt, was later rewarded command of the ship—it became known as Hvide Ørn in Danish service. Printz remained in Danish captivity until July 1719, whereupon he returned to Sweden.

=== Later campaigns ===
In 1720, Printz received command of the 70-gun ship of the line Karlskrona (1686). As hostilities against Denmark died down in favour of peace talks, eventually resulting in the treaties of Stockholm and Frederiksborg, Sweden could focus its naval strength on Russia. As part of a squadron under Baron Carl Hans Wachtmeister (1682–1731), Printz departed Karlskrona on 16 May to conduct operations against the Russian galley fleet in the Sea of Åland. The squadron, however, remained passive after one of its reconnaissance forces was battered off Granhamn on 7 August. Printz returned to Karlskrona on 17 November.

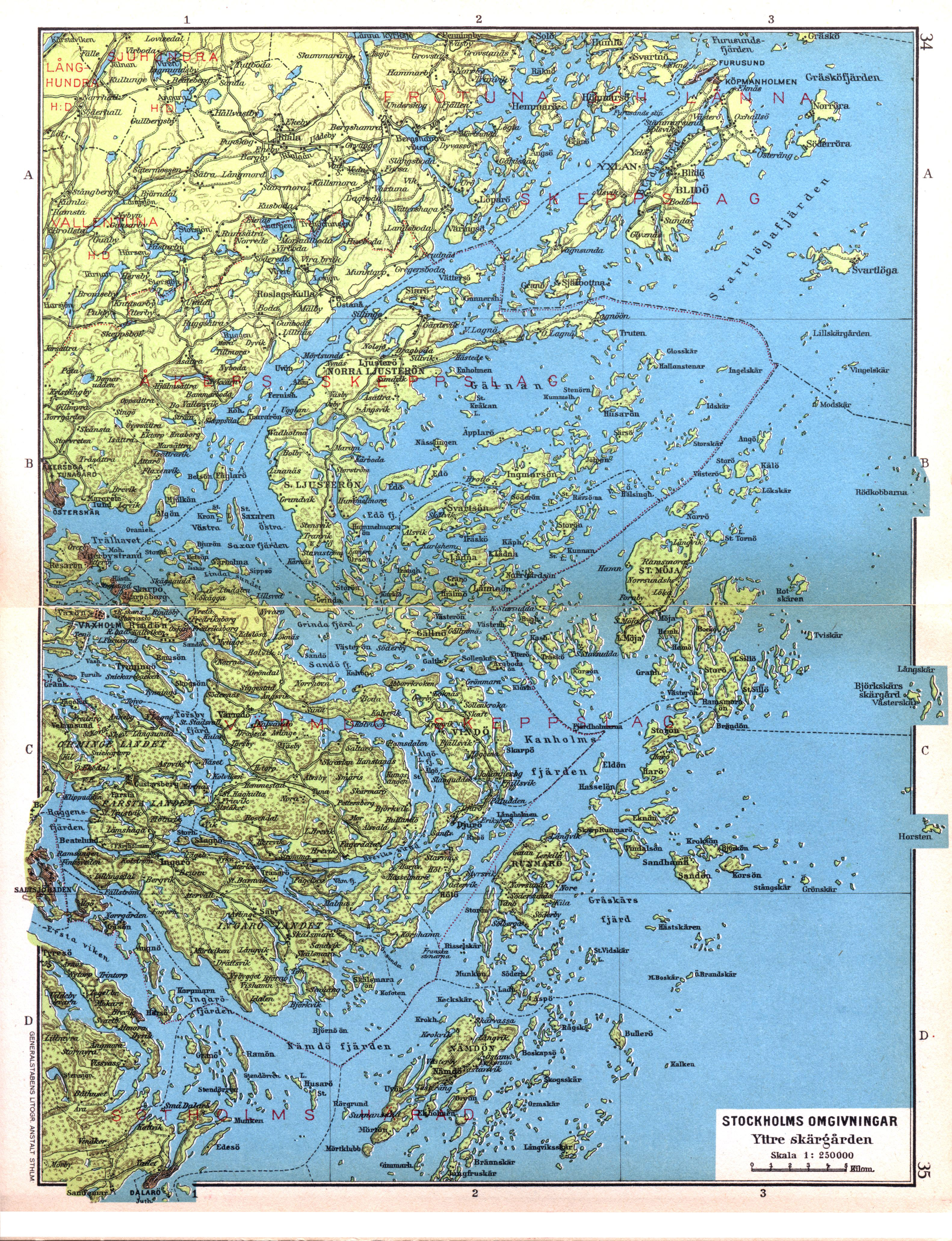
Stockholm Archipelago, Printz's theatre of war in 1720 and 1721

In 1721, Printz was assigned command of the 94-gun ship of the line Göta Lejon (1702). He was part of Count Wachtmeister's squadron, which left Karlskrona on 1 May and rendezvoused with the British fleet under John Norris at Hanö on 13 May. On his arrival two days later, Admiral Claes Sparre temporarily made Göta Lejon his flagship. The combined fleet, whose presence deterred Tsar Peter I of Russia from attacking Stockholm and Gotland, acted defensively in the Stockholm archipelago; major operations were restricted due to the ongoing peace negotiations, concluding with the Treaty of Nystad on 10 September. The squadron returned to Karlskrona on 16 October.

== Legacy ==
Ernst Holmberg attested that "Printz was a brave and tested seaman, who had seen a lot". After the action with Hejren in 1712, Admiral-General Wachtmeister wrote: "I can with particular delight assure that the aforementioned Captain Printz displayed all the valour and commendable bravery that is expected from a sailor and soldier, and treated the Danish captain, who is a small young man, with the courtesy of an honourable officer".

According to author Hjalmar Börjeson, Printz is said to have been "an exceptionally capable officer and, in terms of bravery, a true Carolean, as well as a kind-hearted and helpful man. As commander of the frigate Vita Örn—the finest sailer in the Baltic Sea at the time—he spread unease among the Danes whenever they received word of him cruising ... It is said that Printz long contemplated whether to keep the frigate or accept a promotion [to commodore] and lose it". In 1741, Printz was promoted to schoutbynacht through the intervention of the Estates of the Realm, for "his merits, praiseworthy conduct, and hardships endured".
