= Battle of Køge Bay (1710) =

Naval battle in the Great Northern War

- Part of the Great Northern War
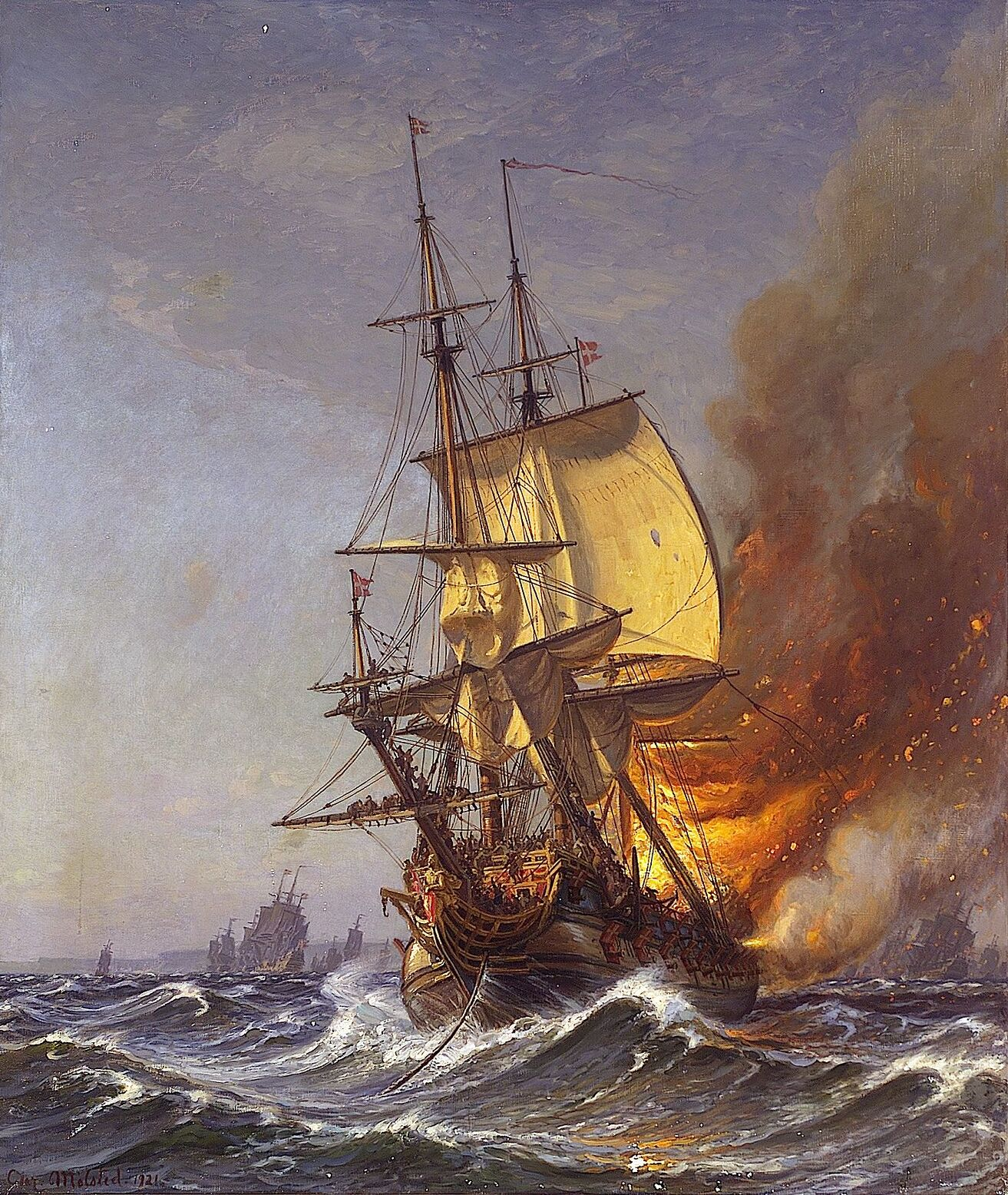
- The Danish ship Dannebroge caught on fire in the battle of Køge Bay; Christian Mølsted, 1921
Date	23 September 1710 (O.S.); 24 September 1710 (Swedish); 4 October 1710 (N.S.)
Location	Køge Bay
Result	Inconclusive

Belligerents
(yes) Swedish Empire	Denmark-Norway

Commanders and leaders
(Swedish Empire) Hans Wachtmeister	(Denmark–Norway) Ulrik Gyldenløve (Denmark–Norway) Iver Huitfeldt †

Strength
21 ships of the line 3 frigates 2 fire ships 3 brigantines 2 bomb vessels	26 ships of the line 5 frigates 5 snows

Casualties and losses
2 ships ran aground 26 dead	1 ship exploded 541 dead on Dannebroge

The Battle of Køge Bay, also known to as the Second Battle of Køge Bay, was an indecisive battle that took place on 4 October 1710 (N.S.) during the Great Northern War in Køge Bay (Danish: Køge Bugt), just south of Copenhagen. Denmark had 26 ships of the line and 5 frigates with 1808 guns, and Sweden had 21 ships of the line and several frigates with 1512 guns. The Danish ship Dannebroge exploded and of the 550-man crew only 9 survived. The Swedish ships Tre Kronor and Prinsessan Ulrika Eleonora ran aground. Because of the weather the battle could not continue. However, the Swedish fleet managed to sink and capture a Danish convoy of transport ships that were supposed to embark a Russian invasion force in Danzig. The action in Køge Bay checked those Russian invasion plans of Sweden.

== Ships involved in the campaign ==
=== Denmark (Gyldenløve) ===
==== Ships of the line ====
- Flagship Elephant (90) under Frantz Petersen Trojel
- Fredericus IV (110) under Christopher Ernst von Stöcken
- Christianus V (100) under Knud Reedtz
- Dannebroge (94) under Iver Huitfeldt - Blew up
- Justitia (90) under Claus Eskesen Güntelberg
- Norske Løve (84) under Christoph Christophersen
- Mars (80) under Jørgen Liebedantz
- Tre Løver (78) under Edvard Deichmann
- Prinds Christian (76) under Otto Jacob Thambsen
- Sophia Hedvig (76) under Christian Carl Gabel
- Wenden (72) under Peter Raben
- Dronning Louisa (70) under Niels Larsen Harfoed
- Haffru (70) under Christen Thomesen Sehested
- Beskjermer (64) under Daniel Jacob Wilster
- Ebenetzer (64) under Henrik Clausen Gude
- Charlotte Amalia (60) under Johan Vibe
- Svan (60) under Hans Jensen Snidstorph
- Anna Sophia (60) under Hans Christopher von Offenberg
- Fredericus III (56) under Rasmus Krag
- Oldenborg (52) under Michael Bille
- Sværdfisk (52) under Hans Knoff
- Tomler (52) under Seneca Christophersen Hagedorn
- Nelleblad (52) under Wiglas von Schindel
- Fyen (50) under Ulrich Kaas
- Delmenhorst (50) under Christian Thomsen Carl
- Island (50) under Andreas Rosenpalm

==== Frigates ====
- Hejren under Hans Jacob Rostgaard
- Højenhald under Michel Gude
- Lossen under Gerhard Siewertz
- Raae under Laurids Reesen
- Ørnen under Peter Hansen

==== Snows ====
- Andrikken under Peder Wichmansen Hofftmann
- Flyvende Abe under Anders Rasmussen Seirøe
- Flyvende Fisk under Mathias Løwe
- Pak an under Cornelius Blichfeldt
- Snarensvend under Ulrik Frederik Suhm

=== Sweden (Wachtmeister) ===
==== Ships of the line ====
- Flagship Göta Lejon (90) under Daniel Grundel
- Enigheten (94) under Jacob De Prou
- Tre Kronor (86) under Carl Ruuth - Aground, scuttled next day
- Wenden (82) under Carl Axelsen Raab
- Sverige (82) under Olof Hubertson WernfeIt
- Prinsessan Hedvig (80) under Hans Husman
- Prinsessan Ulrika (80) under Carl Henrik von Löwe - Aground, scuttled next day
- Göta (76) under Håkon Liderus
- Nordstjernan (76) under Gustaf von Psilander
- Prins Carl (76) under Claes Sparre
- Prins Carl Fredrik (72) under Carl Hans Wachtmeister (1689–1736)
- Småland (70) under Conrad Braunjan
- Karlskrona (70) under Peter Pley
- Skåne (68) under Hans Anckarstierna
- Bremen (64) under Wilhelm Gyllenskepp
- Fredrika Amalia (62) under Mikael Henck
- Westmanland (62) under Olof von Unge
- Pommern (56) under Gustaf Wilhelm von Gertten
- Södermanland (56) under Carl Frischen
- Wachtmeister (56) under Carl Gustav Ulrich
- Werden (54) under Anders Siöstierna

==== Frigates ====
- Phoenix under Johan Casper Printz
- Sophie Louise
- Postiljon

==== Fire ships ====
- Kat af Kurland
- St. Peter

==== Brigantines ====
- Castor
- Pollux
- Skorpionen

==== Bomb vessels ====
- Åskadonner
- Elefant

== Sources ==
- Generalstaben (1906). Bidrag til den store nordiske krigs historie: Felttogene i Nordtyskland og Baahuslen; i Østersøen og Kattegat, 1710–1712 [Contribution to the history of the Great Northern War: The campaigns in northern Germany and Bohuslän; in the Baltic Sea and Kattegat, 1710–1712] (in Danish). Vol. 3. Copenhagen: Gyldendalske Boghandel, Nordisk Forlag. pp. 95–96, 112–113, 116, 123. OCLC 971506418.
- Lars Ericson Wolke (2011), Sjöslag och Rysshärjningar s. 130-133
- Tor Jørgen Melien (2010), Iver Huitfeldt og slaget i Køge bugt 1710, Bergen: John Grieg AS: C. Huitfeldt forlag
- Gunnar Unger (1923). Illustrerad Svensk Sjökrigshistoria omfattande tiden intill 1680–1814. Stockholm: Albert Bonniers Förlag
- Lars Ericson Wolke, Martin Hårdstedt (2009), Svenska sjöslag
- R.C. Anderson (1910), Naval Wars in the Baltic during the Sailing Ship Epoch 1522–1850. London: C. Gilbert-Wood
- For Kongen og Flåten. Matros Trosners dagbok 1710-1714 (1 ed.). Bergen: Fagbokforlaget. 2017. The diary is published by Hans Christian Bjerg and Tor Jørgen Melien.
