= Axel Lagerbielke =

Swedish naval officer (1703–1782)

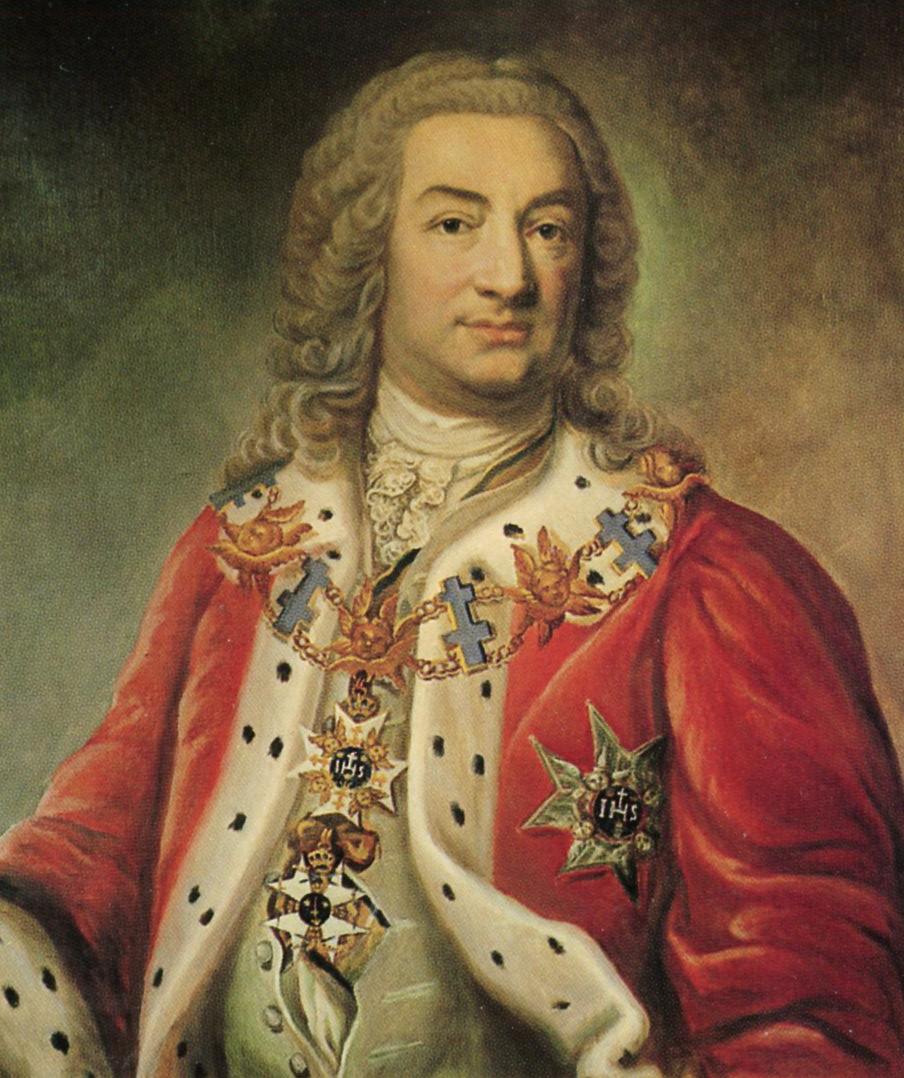
Portrait of Axel Lagerbielke

Baron Axel Lagerbielke (15 July 1703 – 20 May 1782) was a Swedish naval officer and nobleman. He entered naval service early in his life and also served abroad. While in Dutch service, he was taken prisoner by the Spanish navy in the Pacific Ocean and spent over a year as a prisoner in South and Latin America before managing to escape via Jamaica and London back to Sweden. After his return, he pursued a successful career as a naval officer in Sweden; he served on the Admiralty Board of Sweden from 1749 and was promoted to the rank of rear admiral in 1756. He was also active as a civil servant and 1765–1769 member of the Privy Council of Sweden.

== Biography ==
Axel Lagerbielke was born in Karlskrona. He briefly studied at Uppsala University before embarking on a career as a naval officer. He was promoted to sea captain in 1721 and then received permission to leave Sweden and enter foreign employment. While serving on a Dutch frigate in the Pacific Ocean, the ship was seized by the Spanish Navy and Lagerbielke taken prisoner. He spent more than a year as a prisoner in Lima, before being taken to Callao and later Panama and Portobelo, from where he managed to escape on a British packet boat to Jamaica in 1724. From there he travelled to London and back to Sweden.

After his return to Sweden he was soon promoted to frigate captain. During the Russo-Swedish War of 1741–1743 he commanded the ship Freden and was in 1742 promoted to kommendörkapten. In 1746 he was again promoted, to kommendör, and from 1749 he served in the admiralty board. In 1756 he was promoted to rear admiral. During the Pomeranian War, he commanded eight ships in a joint Swedish-Danish squadron in the North Sea against British privateers in 1758, and in 1759 and 1760 he commanded a Swedish squadron in the Baltic Sea.

In 1747 and 1755, he had also temporarily served as county governor in Blekinge County, and in 1765, he was elected member of the Privy Council of Sweden by the Riksdag of the Estates, at the time controlled by the political party known as the Caps. When the opposition gained power in 1769, he was removed from office and thereafter refused several invitations to re-join the Privy Council. He died at his estate Älvsjö gård, today in a suburb of Stockholm (Älvsjö), in 1782.

He was elevated to the rank of Baron in 1766, and was the same year awarded the Order of the Seraphim. He was married twice, first with Sofia Magdalena von Psilander (who died in 1755), and thereafter with Johanna Sophia Riddercreutz. His son Johan Gustaf Lagerbjelke also became a renowned naval officer.

== Sources cited ==
- Dahl, Torsten, ed. (1948). Svenska män och kvinnor. Biografisk uppslagsbok [Swedish men and women. Biographical dictionary] (in Swedish). Vol. 4. Stockholm: Albert Bonnier. OCLC 4629338.
- Hofberg, Herman; Heurlin, Frithiof; Millqvist, Viktor; Rubenson, Olof, eds. (1906). Svenskt biografiskt handlexikon [Swedish biographical handbook] (in Swedish). Vol. 2. Stockholm: Bonniers. OCLC 474064019.
