= 2015 Vålerenga Fotball season =

Vålerenga
2015 season
- Chairman: Thomas Baardseng
- Manager: Kjetil Rekdal
- Stadium: Ullevaal Stadion
- Tippeligaen: 7th
- Norwegian Cup: Second Round vs Gjøvik/Lyn
- Top goalscorer: League: Three Players (7); All: Three Players (7)
Home colours	Away colours	Third colours

Vålerenga Fotball is a Norwegian association football club from Oslo. They play their home games at Ullevaal Stadion which has a capacity of 28,972. During the 2015 campaign they will compete in Tippeligaen and the Norwegian Cup.

== Squad ==
Note: Flags indicate national team as defined under FIFA eligibility rules; some limited exceptions apply. Players may hold more than one non-FIFA nationality.

No.	Pos.	Nation	Player
1	GK	CAN	Lars Hirschfeld
3	DF	EST	Enar Jääger (loan from Flora Tallinn)
4	DF	NOR	Jonatan Tollås
5	DF	SWE	Robert Lundström
6	DF	NOR	Simon Larsen
7	FW	NOR	Daniel Fredheim Holm
8	MF	SWE	Melker Hallberg (loan from Udinese)
9	MF	SWE	Rasmus Lindkvist
10	MF	NOR	Ghayas Zahid
11	MF	NOR	Morten Berre
14	MF	NOR	Herman Stengel
17	FW	NOR	Daniel Braaten
18	FW	NOR	Mohammed Abdellaoue

No.	Pos.	Nation	Player
19	MF	NOR	Christian Grindheim (Captain)
20	MF	NOR	Mathias Totland
21	MF	NOR	Alexander Mathisen
22	FW	ISL	Elías Már Ómarsson
23	MF	NOR	Sander Berge
24	DF	NOR	Kjetil Wæhler
25	DF	NOR	Markus Nakkim
26	FW	JAM	Deshorn Brown
27	MF	NOR	Rino Falk Larsen
30	GK	AUT	Michael Langer
37	DF	NOR	Ivan Näsberg
38	GK	GER	Sascha Burchert (loan from Hertha Berlin)

=== Reserve squad ===
As of 6 April 2015

Note: Flags indicate national team as defined under FIFA eligibility rules; some limited exceptions apply. Players may hold more than one non-FIFA nationality.

No.	Pos.	Nation	Player
34	GK	NOR	Adrian Møller
40	MF	NOR	Mortadha Jassim Alkanany
41	MF	NOR	Rino Falk Larsen

No.	Pos.	Nation	Player
42	MF	NOR	Mats Lien Vågan
43	MF	NOR	Niklas Castro

=== On Loan ===
Note: Flags indicate national team as defined under FIFA eligibility rules; some limited exceptions apply. Players may hold more than one non-FIFA nationality.

No. / Pos. / Nation / Player; 2 / DF / NOR / Niklas Gunnarsson (at Göteborg)	No. / Pos. / Nation / Player; 28 / FW / NOR / Riki Alba (at Bærum)

== Transfers ==
=== Winter ===
In: Note: Flags indicate national team as defined under FIFA eligibility rules; some limited exceptions apply. Players may hold more than one non-FIFA nationality.

No.	Pos.	Nation	Player
4	DF	NOR	Jonatan Tollås Nation (from (Norway) Aalesund)
17	FW	NOR	Daniel Braaten (free agent)
22	MF	CRC	Diego Calvo (loan return from (Sweden) IFK Göteborg)
22	FW	ISL	Elías Már Ómarsson (from (Iceland) Keflavík)
23	MF	NOR	Sander Berge (from (Norway) Asker)
24	DF	NOR	Kjetil Wæhler (from (Sweden) IFK Göteborg)
26	FW	JAM	Deshorn Brown (from (United States) Colorado Rapids)
28	FW	NOR	Riki Alba (loan return from (Norway) Nest-Sotra)

Out: Note: Flags indicate national team as defined under FIFA eligibility rules; some limited exceptions apply. Players may hold more than one non-FIFA nationality.

No.	Pos.	Nation	Player
10	FW	ISL	Vidar Örn Kjartansson (to (China) Jiangsu Guoxin-Sainty)
15	DF	NOR	Max Bjørsvik (loan return to (Norway) Nest-Sotra)
22	MF	CRC	Diego Calvo (to (Costa Rica) Alajuelense)
24	DF	DEN	Nicolai Høgh (released)
25	MF	NOR	Markus Brændsrød (to (Norway) Lillestrøm)
26	DF	NOR	Simen Olafsen (to (Norway) Follo)
28	FW	NOR	Riki Alba (on loan to (Norway) Bærum)
34	GK	NOR	Gudmund Taksdal Kongshavn (to (Norway) Tromsø)
35	DF	NOR	Kamran Ali Iqbal (to (Norway) Nest Sotra)
36	MF	NOR	Mathias Blårud (to (Norway) Strømmen)
43	MF	NOR	Fitim Kastrati (released)
—	DF	NOR	André Muri (retired)

=== Summer ===
In: Note: Flags indicate national team as defined under FIFA eligibility rules; some limited exceptions apply. Players may hold more than one non-FIFA nationality.

No.	Pos.	Nation	Player
3	DF	EST	Enar Jääger (loan from (Estonia) Flora Tallinn)
5	DF	SWE	Robert Lundström (from (Sweden) GIF Sundsvall)
8	MF	SWE	Melker Hallberg (loan from (Italy) Udinese)
18	FW	NOR	Mohammed Abdellaoue (from (Germany) Stuttgart)
38	GK	GER	Sascha Burchert (on loan from (Germany) Hertha Berlin)
38	GK	FIN	Otto Fredrikson (loan from (Norway) Kongsvinger)

Out: Note: Flags indicate national team as defined under FIFA eligibility rules; some limited exceptions apply. Players may hold more than one non-FIFA nationality.

No.	Pos.	Nation	Player
2	DF	NOR	Niklas Gunnarsson (on loan to (Sweden) Elfsborg)
3	DF	NOR	Ruben Kristiansen (to (Norway) Brann)
8	MF	NOR	Sivert Heltne Nilsen (to (Norway) Brann)
18	MF	NOR	Moussa Nije (to (Norway) Bærum)
38	GK	FIN	Otto Fredrikson (loan return to (Norway) Kongsvinger)

== Pre-season and friendlies ==
5 March 2015 Friendly	Marbella (Spain)	0–3	(Norway) Vålerenga	Spain
			Már Ómarsson; Heltne Nilsen; Grindheim

9 August 2015 Friendly	Vålerenga (Norway)	0–0	(Spain) Real Madrid	Oslo
15:00 UTC+2		Report		Stadium: Ullevaal Stadion; Attendance: 27,010; Referee: Svein Oddvar Moen

== Competitions ==
=== Tippeligaen ===
==== Results summary ====
Overall								Home						Away					
Pld	W	D	L	GF	GA	GD	Pts	W	D	L	GF	GA	GD	W	D	L	GF	GA	GD
30	14	7	9	49	41	+8	49	7	2	6	25	20	+5	7	5	3	24	21	+3

Last updated: 8 November 2015.
Source: see below

==== Results by round ====
Round	1	2	3	4	5	6	7	8	9	10	11	12	13	14	15	16	17	18	19	20	21	22	23	24	25	26	27	28	29	30
Ground	H	A	H	A	H	A	H	A	H	A	A	H	A	H	A	H	H	A	H	A	H	A	H	A	H	A	H	A	H	A
Result	W	D	W	W	L	D	L	W	W	W	W	L	D	L	W	W	W	L	W	L	L	L	L	W	D	D	W	W	D	D
Position	3	3	3	3	3	3	6	4	3	3	3	3	3	4	3	3	2	3	3	4	4	6	6	6	6	6	6	6	7	7

Updated to match(es) played on 8 November 2015. Source: see below
A = Away; H = Home; W = Win; D = Draw; L = Loss

==== Results ====
6 April 2015 1	Vålerenga	3–1	Strømsgodset	Oslo
19:00 CEST (UTC+1)	Grindheim 22'; Holm 40' (pen.); Larsen (yellow card) 43'; Gunnarsson 71'; Braaten (yellow card) 83'	Summary	Horn (yellow card) 16'; Wæhler 37' (o.g.); Vilsvik (yellow card) 58'; Wikheim (yellow card) 84'	Stadium: Ullevål stadion Attendance: 14,405; Referee: Svein Erik Edvartsen

10 April 2015 2	Sarpsborg 08	1–1	Vålerenga	Sarpsborg
19:00 CEST (UTC+2)	Nordvik 66'	Summary	Larsen (yellow card) 43'; Stengel (yellow card) 49'; Zahid 68'	Stadium: Sarpsborg stadion Attendance: 5,137; Referee: Tom Harald Hagen

17 April 2015 3	Vålerenga	2–0	Haugesund	Oslo
19:00 CEST (UTC+2)	Brown 36', 37'	Summary	Bjørnbak (yellow card) 22'; Andreassen (yellow card) 90+3'	Stadium: Ullevål stadion Attendance: 8,007; Referee: Anders Johansen

24 April 2015 4	Start	2–3	Vålerenga	Kristiansand
19:00 CEST (UTC+2)	Børufsen 43'; Vilhjálmsson 53'	Summary	Zahid 4'; Brown 55'; Stengel 84'	Stadium: Sør Arena; Attendance: 7,349; Referee: Dag Vidar Hafsås

30 April 2015 5	Vålerenga	1–2	Aalesund	Oslo
18:00 CEST (UTC+2)	Gunnarsson 43'	Summary	James (yellow card) 51', (goal) 76'; Mattila (yellow card) 65', (goal) 81'	Stadium: Ullevaal Stadion; Attendance: 8,089; Referee: Tore Hansen

3 May 2015 6	Lillestrøm	1–1	Vålerenga	Lillestrøm
18:00 CEST (UTC+2)	Margerisson (yellow card) 42'; Fofana (yellow card) 65'; Andersson 68' (pen.)	Summary	Holm 22'; Brown (yellow card) 51'	Stadium: Åråsen stadion Attendance: 9,071; Referee: Ken Henry Johnsen

9 May 2015 7	Vålerenga	0–2	Stabæk	Oslo
20:00 CEST (UTC+2)	Grindheim (yellow card) 72'	Summary	Diomande 35' (pen.); Kassi (yellow card) 42' (yellow-red card) 56'; Asante 64'; El Ghanassy (yellow card) 75'	Stadium: Ullevaal Stadion; Attendance: 7,500; Referee: Tom Harald Hagen

12 May 2015 8	Tromsø	4–5	Vålerenga	Tromsø
18:00 CEST (UTC+2)	Ingebrigtsen 3'; Ondrášek 19'; Andersen 53', 84'	Summary	Stengel 17'; Larsen 41'; Nilsen (yellow card) 46'; Grindheim 74'; Wæhler (yellow card) 76'; Lindkvist 77'; Holm (yellow card) 78', (goal) 87'	Stadium: Alfheim stadion Attendance: 3,381; Referee: Tore Hansen

16 May 2015 9	Vålerenga	4–2	Mjøndalen	Oslo
15:30 CEST (UTC+2)	Lindkvist 27', 73'; Grindheim 42', (yellow card) 56'; Berre 88'; Holm (yellow card) 90+3'	Summary	Aasmundsen (yellow card) 22'; Gundersen 43'; Bernstein (yellow card) 77'; Olsen 87'	Stadium: Ullevål stadion Attendance: 12 011; Referee: Svein Oddvar Moen

25 May 2015 10	Sandefjord	0–3	Vålerenga	Sandefjord
20:00 CEST (UTC+2)	Sellin (yellow card) 22'; Gabrielsen (red card) 90+2'	Summary	Braaten 14'; Wæhler 33' (yellow card) 57'; Holm 88' (pen.)	Stadium: Komplett Arena; Attendance: 4,338; Referee: Tore Hansen

31 May 2015 11	Viking	3–4	Vålerenga	Stavanger
18:00 CEST (UTC+2)	Adegbenro (yellow card) 33'; Thioune (yellow card) 40'; Berisha 45+4', 82'; Böðvarsson 69'; Sigurðsson (yellow card) 85'	Summary	Zahid 6', 24'; Brown 44'; Larsen (yellow card) 65'; Gunnarsson (yellow card) 77'; Grindheim 90+4'	Stadium: Viking stadion Attendance: 11,519; Referee: Ken Henry Johnsen

7 June 2015 12	Vålerenga	1–2	Rosenborg	Oslo
15:30 CEST (UTC+2)	Nilsen (yellow card) 56'; Brown 66'; Stengel (yellow card) 79'; Ómarsson (yellow card) 86'	Summary	Helland 50', 54', (yellow card) 65'	Stadium: Ullevaal stadion Attendance: 20,958; Referee: Tom Harald Hagen

20 June 2015 13	Molde	0–0	Vålerenga	Molde
18:00 CEST (UTC+2)	Hussain (yellow card) 26'	Summary	Wæhler (yellow card) 51'; Zahid (yellow card) 62'; Stengel (yellow card) 66'	Stadium: Aker Stadion; Attendance: 9,332; Referee: Kim Andre Johnsen

28 June 2015 14	Vålerenga	1–2	Bodø/Glimt	Oslo
20:00 CEST (UTC+2)	Holm 46'; Gunnarsson (yellow card) 55'	Summary	Sørloth (yellow card) 30', (goal) 81'; Chatto (yellow card) 71'; Londak (yellow card) 90+1'; Olsen 90+2'	Stadium: Ullevål stadion Attendance: 7,765; Referee: Svein Oddvar Moen

5 July 2015 15	Odd	1–2	Vålerenga	Skien
18:00 CEST (UTC+2)	Occéan 54'	Summary	Ómarsson 22', 85'; Mathisen (yellow card) 54'	Stadium: Skagerak Arena; Attendance: 8,161; Referee: Tom Harald Hagen

12 July 2015 16	Vålerenga	2–0	Sandefjord	Oslo
18:00 CEST (UTC+2)	Ómarsson 12', (yellow card) 90+3'; Fredrikson (yellow card) 25'; Wæhler (yellow card) 39', (goal) 43'	Summary	Mjelde (yellow card) 51'	Stadium: Ullevaal stadion Attendance: 7,615; Referee: Svein-Erik Edvartsen

27 July 2015 17	Vålerenga	2–0	Lillestrøm	Oslo
19:00 CEST (UTC+2)	Mathisen 50' (pen.); Amundsen 65' (o.g.)	Summary	Lundemo (yellow card) 39'; Amundsen (yellow card) 79'; Kippe (yellow card) 81'	Stadium: Ullevaal stadion Attendance: 15,661; Referee: Svein Oddvar Moen

1 August 2015 18	Stabæk	2–0	Vålerenga	Bærum
18:00 CEST (UTC+2)	Asante 11'; Kassi 72'	Summary	Stengel (yellow card) 82'	Stadium: Nadderud Stadion; Attendance: 4,782; Referee: Espen Berntsen

7 August 2015 19	Vålerenga	1–0	Tromsø	Oslo
19:00 CEST (UTC+2)	Zahid 19'; Stengel (yellow card) 27'; Hallberg (yellow card) 90+2'	Summary	Ondrášek (yellow card) 9'; Landu (yellow card) 75'	Stadium: Ullevaal Stadion; Attendance: 7,629; Referee: Kim Andre Johnsen

16 August 2015 20	Rosenborg	2–0	Vålerenga	Trondheim
18:00 CEST (UTC+2)	Søderlund 54'; Eyjólfsson 76'	Summary	Lundström (yellow card) 40' (yellow-red card) 51'	Stadium: Lerkendal Stadion; Attendance: 20,768; Referee: Tore Hansen

23 August 2015 21	Vålerenga	0–1	Molde	Oslo
15:30 CEST (UTC+2)	Wæhler (yellow card) 33'; Näsberg (yellow card) 80'; Holm (yellow card) 81'	Summary	Flo 13'	Stadium: Ullevaal Stadion; Attendance: 9,203; Referee: Dag Vidar Hafsås

28 August 2015 22	Aalesund	2–0	Vålerenga	Ålesund
19:00 CEST (UTC+2)	James 12'; Larsen 45+1'	[ Summary]	Tollås (yellow card) 35'	Stadium: Color Line stadion Attendance: 6,479; Referee: Tommy Skjerven

13 September 2015 23	Vålerenga	2–4	Viking	Oslo
20:00 CEST (UTC+2)	Abdellaoue 7'; Berge (yellow card) 30'; Jääger 64'; Brown (yellow card) 81'	Summary	Abdullahi 11'; Adegbenro 35'; Jørgensen 67'; Moore (yellow card) 83'; Danielsen 85' (pen.)	Stadium: Ullevaal stadion Attendance: 7,198; Referee: Kim Andre Johnsen

20 September 2015 24	Mjøndalen	0–1	Vålerenga	Mjøndalen
20:00 CEST (UTC+2)	Arneberg (yellow card) 88'	Summary	Jääger 22'; Zahid (yellow card) 88'	Stadium: Isachsen Stadion; Attendance: 2,502; Referee: Espen Berntsen

25 September 2015 25	Vålerenga	1–1	Start	Oslo
19:00 CEST (UTC+2)	Holm 18'; Wæhler (yellow card) 65'	Summary	Breimyr (yellow card) 36'; Vikstøl (yellow card) 50'; Opdal 66'	Stadium: Ullevaal stadion Attendance: 8,308; Referee: Svein Oddvar Moen

2 October 2015 26	Bodø/Glimt	1–1	Vålerenga	Bodø
19:00 CEST (UTC+2)	Olsen 78'	Summary	Larsen (yellow card) 44'; Brown 60'	Stadium: Aspmyra stadion Attendance: 3,197; Referee: Kai Erik Steen

18 October 2015 27	Vålerenga	3–1	Sarpsborg 08	Oslo
18:00 CEST (UTC+2)	Ómarsson 32'; Zahid 35'; Holm 57'	Summary	Askar (yellow card) 27'; Groven 51'	Stadium: Ullevaal Stadion; Attendance: 6,908; Referee: Tommy Skjerven

24 October 2015 28	Haugesund	0–1	Vålerenga	Haugesund
18:00 CEST (UTC+2)	Yusuf (yellow card) 59'	Summary	Grindheim 45'; Zahid (yellow card) 54'; Braaten (yellow card) 84'; Holm (yellow card) 90+1'	Stadium: Haugesund Stadion; Attendance: 4,802; Referee: Kim Andre Johnsen

1 November 2015 29	Vålerenga	2–2	Odd	Oslo
18:00 CET (UTC+1)	Hallberg 1'; Brown 24'; Berre (yellow card) 72'; Wæhler (yellow card) 90'	Summary	Jonassen (yellow card) 10'; Nordkvelle (yellow card) 39' (goal) 62'; Storbæk 85'; Occéan (yellow card) 90'	Stadium: Ullevål stadion Attendance: 9,753; Referee: Dag Vidar Hafsås

8 November 2015 30	Strømsgodset	2–2	Vålerenga	Drammen
18:00 CET (UTC+1)	Pedersen 1', 41'; Horn (yellow card) 90+3'	Summary	Hallberg 61'; Zahid 74'; Grindheim (yellow card) 78'	Stadium: Marienlyst stadion Attendance: 8,468; Referee: Svein Oddvar Moen

==== Table ====
Pos	Team	Pld	W	D	L	GF	GA	GD	Pts
5	Viking	30	17	2	11	53	39	+14	53
6	Molde	30	15	7	8	62	31	+31	52
7	Vålerenga	30	14	7	9	49	41	+8	49
8	Lillestrøm (Note: Lillestrøm started the season with a one point deduction due to poor financial reporting.)	30	12	9	9	45	43	+2	44
9	Bodø/Glimt	30	12	4	14	53	56	−3	40

Source: Football Association of Norway (in Norwegian), Soccerway
Rules for classification: 1) Points; 2) Goal difference; 3) Goals scored; 4) Head-to-head points; 5) Head-to-head goal difference; 6) Head-to-head away goals scored (between two teams).

=== Norwegian Cup ===
21 April 2015 First Round	Lokomotiv Oslo	0–8	Vålerenga	Oslo
18:00 CEST (UTC+2)		Summary	Berge 8'; Njie 19', 21', 33'; Stengel 26', 55'; Ómarsson 45'; Berre 73'	Stadium: Frogner stadion Attendance: 1,117; Referee: Espen Eskås

6 May 2015 Second Round	Gjøvik/Lyn	1–0	Vålerenga	Gjøvik
18:00 CEST (UTC+2)	Sørum (yellow card) 36'; Strand (yellow card) 38'; Hervás (yellow card) 45'; Naglestad 61'; Ntabwe (yellow card) 74'; Diawara (yellow card) 89'	Summary	Zahid (yellow card) 64'	Stadium: Gjøvik Stadion; Attendance: 1,785; Referee: Mathias Smehus Kringstad

== Squad statistics ==
As of match played 8 November 2015

=== Appearances and goals ===
No.	Pos	Nat	Player	Total		Tippeligaen		Norwegian Cup	
No.	Pos	Nat	Player	Apps	Goals	Apps	Goals	Apps	Goals
1	GK	(Canada) CAN	Lars Hirschfeld	1	0	0	0	1	0
3	DF	(Estonia) EST	Enar Jääger	8	2	8	2	0	0
4	DF	(Norway) NOR	Jonatan Tollås	21	0	21	0	0	0
5	DF	(Sweden) SWE	Robert Lundström	9	0	9	0	0	0
6	DF	(Norway) NOR	Simon Larsen	28	1	21+5	1	2	0
7	FW	(Norway) NOR	Daniel Fredheim Holm	24	7	23+1	7	0	0
8	MF	(Sweden) SWE	Melker Hallberg	10	2	6+4	2	0	0
9	DF	(Sweden) SWE	Rasmus Lindkvist	24	3	18+5	3	1	0
10	MF	(Norway) NOR	Ghayas Zahid	31	7	28+1	7	0+2	0
11	MF	(Norway) NOR	Morten Berre	10	2	0+8	1	2	1
14	MF	(Norway) NOR	Herman Stengel	25	4	16+7	2	1+1	2
17	MF	(Norway) NOR	Daniel Braaten	24	1	11+11	1	1+1	0
18	FW	(Norway) NOR	Mohammed Abdellaoue	4	1	3+1	1	0	0
19	MF	(Norway) NOR	Christian Grindheim	30	5	30	5	0	0
20	MF	(Norway) NOR	Mattias Totland	0	0	0	0	0	0
21	MF	(Norway) NOR	Alexander Mathisen	21	1	13+7	1	1	0
22	FW	(Iceland) ISL	Elías Már Ómarsson	17	5	8+7	4	2	1
23	MF	(Norway) NOR	Sander Berge	13	1	6+5	0	2	1
24	DF	(Norway) NOR	Kjetil Wæhler	25	2	25	2	0	0
25	DF	(Norway) NOR	Markus Nakkim	10	0	2+6	0	2	0
26	FW	(Jamaica) JAM	Deshorn Brown	23	7	16+7	7	0	0
30	GK	(Austria) AUT	Michael Langer	15	0	14	0	1	0
37	DF	(Norway) NOR	Ivan Näsberg	10	0	6+3	0	1	0
38	GK	(Germany) GER	Sascha Burchert	14	0	14	0	0	0
41	MF	(Norway) NOR	Rino Falk Larsen	1	0	0	0	0+1	0
42	MF	(Norway) NOR	Simen Hestnes	1	0	0	0	0+1	0
Players away from Vålerenga on loan:
2	DF	(Norway) NOR	Niklas Gunnarsson	14	2	9+4	2	1	0
28	FW	(Norway) NOR	Riki Alba	0	0	0	0	0	0
Players who left Vålerenga during the season:
3	DF	(Norway) NOR	Ruben Kristiansen	17	0	15+1	0	1	0
8	MF	(Norway) NOR	Sivert Heltne Nilsen	14	0	7+6	0	1	0
18	MF	(Norway) NOR	Moussa Njie	2	3	0	0	2	3
38	GK	(Finland) FIN	Otto Fredrikson	2	0	2	0	0	0

=== Goal Scorers ===
Place	Position	Nation	Number	Name	Tippeligaen	Norwegian Cup	Total
1	FW	(Norway)	7	Daniel Fredheim Holm	7	0	7
1	FW	(Jamaica)	26	Deshorn Brown	7	0	7
1	MF	(Norway)	10	Ghayas Zahid	7	0	7
4	MF	(Norway)	19	Christian Grindheim	5	0	5
4	FW	(Iceland)	22	Elías Már Ómarsson	4	1	5
6	MF	(Norway)	14	Herman Stengel	2	2	4
7	DF	(Sweden)	9	Rasmus Lindkvist	3	0	3
7	MF	(Norway)	18	Moussa Njie	0	3	3
9	DF	(Norway)	2	Niklas Gunnarsson	2	0	2
9	DF	(Norway)	24	Kjetil Wæhler	2	0	2
9	DF	(Estonia)	3	Enar Jääger	2	0	2
9	MF	(Sweden)	8	Melker Hallberg	2	0	2
9	MF	(Norway)	11	Morten Berre	1	1	2
14	MF	(Norway)	17	Daniel Braaten	1	0	1
14	DF	(Norway)	6	Simon Larsen	1	0	1
14	MF	(Norway)	21	Alexander Mathisen	1	0	1
14	FW	(Norway)	18	Mohammed Abdellaoue	1	0	1
14				Own goal	1	0	1
14	MF	(Norway)	23	Sander Berge	0	1	1
				TOTALS	49	8	57

=== Disciplinary record ===
Number	Nation	Position	Name	Tippeligaen		Norwegian Cup		Total	
Number	Nation	Position	Name	Yellow card	Red card	Yellow card	Red card	Yellow card	Red card
2	(Norway)	DF	Niklas Gunnarsson	2	0	0	0	2	0
4	(Norway)	DF	Jonatan Tollås	1	0	0	0	1	0
5	(Sweden)	DF	Robert Lundström	2	1	0	0	2	1
6	(Norway)	DF	Simon Larsen	4	0	0	0	4	0
7	(Norway)	MF	Daniel Fredheim Holm	4	0	0	0	4	0
8	(Norway)	MF	Sivert Heltne Nilsen	2	0	0	0	2	0
8	(Sweden)	MF	Melker Hallberg	1	0	0	0	1	0
10	(Norway)	MF	Ghayas Zahid	3	0	1	0	4	0
11	(Norway)	MF	Morten Berre	1	0	0	0	1	0
14	(Norway)	MF	Herman Stengel	5	0	0	0	3	0
17	(Norway)	MF	Daniel Braaten	2	0	0	0	2	0
19	(Norway)	MF	Christian Grindheim	3	0	0	0	3	0
21	(Norway)	MF	Alexander Mathisen	1	0	0	0	1	0
22	(Iceland)	FW	Elías Már Ómarsson	2	0	0	0	2	0
23	(Norway)	MF	Sander Berge	1	0	0	0	1	0
24	(Norway)	DF	Kjetil Wæhler	7	0	0	0	7	0
26	(Jamaica)	FW	Deshorn Brown	2	0	0	0	2	0
37	(Norway)	DF	Ivan Näsberg	1	0	0	0	1	0
38	(Finland)	GK	Otto Fredrikson	1	0	0	0	1	0
			TOTALS	45	1	1	0	46	1
