= Melker Hallberg =

Swedish footballer

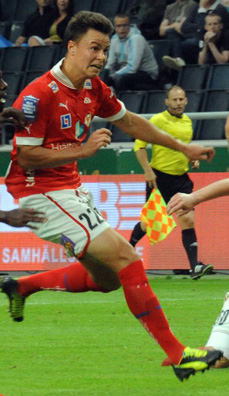

Personal information
- Full name: Charles Melker Otto Hallberg
- Date of birth: 20 October 1995 (age 31)
- Place of birth: Ljungbyholm, Sweden
- Height: 1.80 m (5 ft 11 in)
- Position: Midfielder

Team information
- Current team: Kalmar FF
- Number: 5

Youth career
- Möre BK
- 2010–2011: Kalmar FF

Senior career*
Years	Team	Apps	(Gls)
2012–2014	Kalmar FF	54	(6)
2014–2018	Udinese	4	(0)
2015	→ Vålerenga (loan)	10	(2)
2016	→ Hammarby IF (loan)	12	(1)
2016	→ Ascoli (loan)	7	(1)
2017–2018	→ Kalmar FF (loan)	40	(2)
2018–2019	Vejle BK	25	(1)
2019–2022	Hibernian	45	(1)
2022–2023	St Johnstone	44	(2)
2023–	Kalmar FF	78	(6)

International career
2010–2012	Sweden U17	19	(0)
2012–2014	Sweden U19	9	(1)
2013–2017	Sweden U21	23	(3)
2016–2019	Sweden	3	(1)
- * Club domestic league appearances and goals as of 8 July 2026

Melker Hallberg (born 20 October 1995) is a Swedish professional footballer who plays as a midfielder for Kalmar FF.

Hallberg began his senior career at Kalmar FF, then in 2014, he signed for Italian club Udinese, and during his time there went on loan to Vålerenga, Hammarby IF, Ascoli and Kalmar FF. He signed for Vejle BK in 2018, where he spent one season. Hallberg then played in three seasons for Scottish club Hibernian. He made his full international debut for the Sweden national team in 2016, and has won a total of three caps and scored one goal.

== Career ==
=== Early career ===
Hallberg grew up in the small town of Ljungbyholm, shortly to the south of Kalmar. There he started with the local club Möre BK where he played for the first team in the seventh tier of Swedish football at age thirteen.

In 2010 Hallberg was brought into the Kalmar FF youth section. Two years later he became the youngest-ever first-team player for the club when he made his Allsvenskan debut at the age of sixteen. On July 15, 2012, Hallberg became the fourth-youngest Allsvenskan goalscorer of all time when he scored the game-winning 2–1 goal against IF Elfsborg. In December 2012 he signed a new four-year contract extension. After his second season in Allsvenskan as a seventeen-year-old, Hallberg was ranked as the 14th-best player in the league by newspaper Expressen.

=== Udinese ===
In August 2014, Hallberg signed for Italian club Udinese. He made his debut in January 2015.

In 2015, he was loaned out to Norwegian club Vålerenga Fotball, and in 2016 he was loaned out to Hammarby Fotboll in his native Sweden.

=== Vejle BK ===
Hallberg joined Danish club Vejle Boldklub in the summer 2018. He left the club at the end of the 2018–19 season.

=== Hibernian ===
Hallberg signed a three-year contract with Scottish Premiership club Hibernian in August 2019. He scored his first goal for the club in a Scottish League Cup tie against Celtic on 2 November 2019. He was released from his contract with Hibernian in January 2022.

=== St Johnstone ===
Following his release by Hibernian, Hallberg signed an 18-month contract with St Johnstone in January 2022. After prolonged renegotiations, Hallberg left The Saints in July 2023.

=== Return to Kalmar ===
In August 2023, Hallberg returned to his first club Kalmar FF on a contract until the end of the season.

== International career ==
Hallberg has featured regularly at all age levels of Swedish youth national teams. In August 2013 he got selected for the first time ever to the Swedish U21 squad in a friendly against Norway. He was selected for Sweden squads in January 2016 and January 2019.

== Career statistics ==
As of 6 May 2023

Club	Season	League			National Cup		League Cup		Other		Total	
Club	Season	Division	Apps	Goals	Apps	Goals	Apps	Goals	Apps	Goals	Apps	Goals
Kalmar FF	2012	Allsvenskan	11	1	1 (Note: Appearances in the 2012–13 Svenska Cupen)	0	—		3 (Note: Appearances in the UEFA Europa League)	0	15	1
Kalmar FF	2013	Allsvenskan	29	4	2	0	—		—		31	4
Kalmar FF	2014	Allsvenskan	14	1	0	0	—		—		14	1
Kalmar FF	Total		54	6	3	0	0	0	3	0	60	6
Udinese	2014–15	Serie A	4	0	1	0	0	0	—		5	0
Udinese	2015–16	Serie A	0	0	0	0	0	0	—		0	0
Udinese	2016–17	Serie A	0	0	0	0	0	0	—		0	0
Udinese	2017–18	Serie A	0	0	0	0	0	0	—		0	0
Udinese	Total		4	0	1	0	0	0	0	0	5	0
Vålerenga (loan)	2015	Tippeligaen	10	2	0	0	—		—		10	2
Hammarby IF (loan)	2016	Allsvenskan	12	1	4 (Note: Appearances in the 2015–16 Svenska Cupen)	1	—		—		16	2
Ascoli (loan)	2016–17	Serie B	7	1	1	0	—		—		8	1
Kalmar FF (loan)	2017	Allsvenskan	27	2	3 (Note: Appearances in the 2016–17 Svenska Cupen)	0	—		—		30	2
Kalmar FF (loan)	2018	Allsvenskan	13	0	3 (Note: Appearances in the 2017–18 Svenska Cupen)	0	—		—		16	0
Kalmar FF (loan)	Total		40	2	6	0	0	0	0	0	46	2
Vejle BK	2018–19	Danish Superliga	25	1	0	0	—		2 (Note: Appearances in the Danish Superliga Relegation round)	0	27	1
Hibernian	2019–20	Scottish Premiership	20	1	3	0	2	1	—		25	2
Hibernian	2020–21	Scottish Premiership	25	0	4	0	6	1	—		35	1
Hibernian	2021–22	Scottish Premiership	0	0	1	0	0	0	0	0	1	0
Hibernian	Total		45	1	8	0	8	2	0	0	61	3
St Johnstone	2021–22	Scottish Premiership	14	0	0	0	0	0	0	0	14	0
St Johnstone	2022–23	Scottish Premiership	30	2	1	0	4	1	—		35	3
St Johnstone	Total		44	2	1	0	4	1	0	0	49	3
Career total			241	16	24	1	12	3	5	0	283	20

=== International ===
Appearances and goals by national team and year
National team	Year	Apps	Goals
Sweden	2016	2	1
Sweden	2017	0	0
Sweden	2018	0	0
Sweden	2019	1	0
Total		3	1

Scores and results list Sweden's goal tally first, score column indicates score after each Hallberg goal.

List of international goals scored by Melker Hallberg
No.	Date	Venue	Opponent	Score	Result	Competition	Ref.
1	10 January 2016	Armed Forces Stadium, Abu Dhabi, United Arab Emirates	Finland	2–0	3–0	Friendly	

== Honours ==
Individual

- Allsvenskan newcomer of the year: 2013
