= HSwMS Södermanland (1693) =

Swedish ship built in 1693

HSwMS Södermanland was a ship of the line that served in the Royal Swedish Navy. It was built in Karlskrona in 1693. During the Battle of Fehmarn, she was captured by Admiral Christian Wilhelm Gabel and subsequently commissioned into the Royal Dano-Norwegian Navy as HDMS Sydermanland. After an unsuccessful rebuilding in the 1740s, she was presented to the Danish Asiatic Company for use as an East Indiaman.

== Construction and design ==
Södermanland was built in 1693 at Karlskrona to a design by Charles Shelton.

== Career ==
=== Swedish naval service ===
Södermanland took part in the campaign against Denmark in 1710. In the same year, she took part in the Battle of Kæge Bay. During the Battle of Fehmarn, on 25 April 1715, she was captured by Admiral Christian Carl Gabel. She was subsequently commissioned into the Royal Dano-Norwegian Navy as HDMS Sydermanland.

=== Danish naval service ===
In 1716, Sydermanland was under the command of Laurtiz Christopher Ulfeldt, first in the Baltic Sea and then (from 14 November) as part of the North Sea squadron under Tordenskiold. In 1717, she was under the command of Christian Boysen. In 1718, as part of Admiral Raben's squadron, she was under the command of Hans Jacob Rostgaard.

In 1742–43, she was rebuilt at Nyholm Dockyards under Laurent Barbé. After the alterations, she proved an unstable and poorly maneuverable ship.

In 1746, she was sent to Algier as part of a squadron (cf. Frederik Michael Krabbe)

=== DAC service ===
On 6 September 1752, Sydermanland was presented to the Danish Asiatic Company.

Capt. Niels Olsen Hielte sailed from Copenhagen on 6 February 1752, bound for Tranquebar. Diderich Bagge was second-in-command. Hermann Abbestée and Bartholomæus Lebrecht Ziegenbalg were on board the ship as passengers.

Stdermanland called at Porto Prayo en route to Tranquebar. After six daus, she continued her voyage. She anchored at the Roads of Tranquebar on 11 August. She sailed from Tranquebar on 18 October, bound for Copenhagen.

The log book (kept by Hielte) covers the period from 7 January 1753 – 29 May 1755. An account book (kept by assistant Carl Christian Ernst) covers the period 22 January 1753 – 29 May 1755.
