= Battle of Fehmarn (1715) =

Naval battle during the Great Northern War

- Part of the Great Northern War
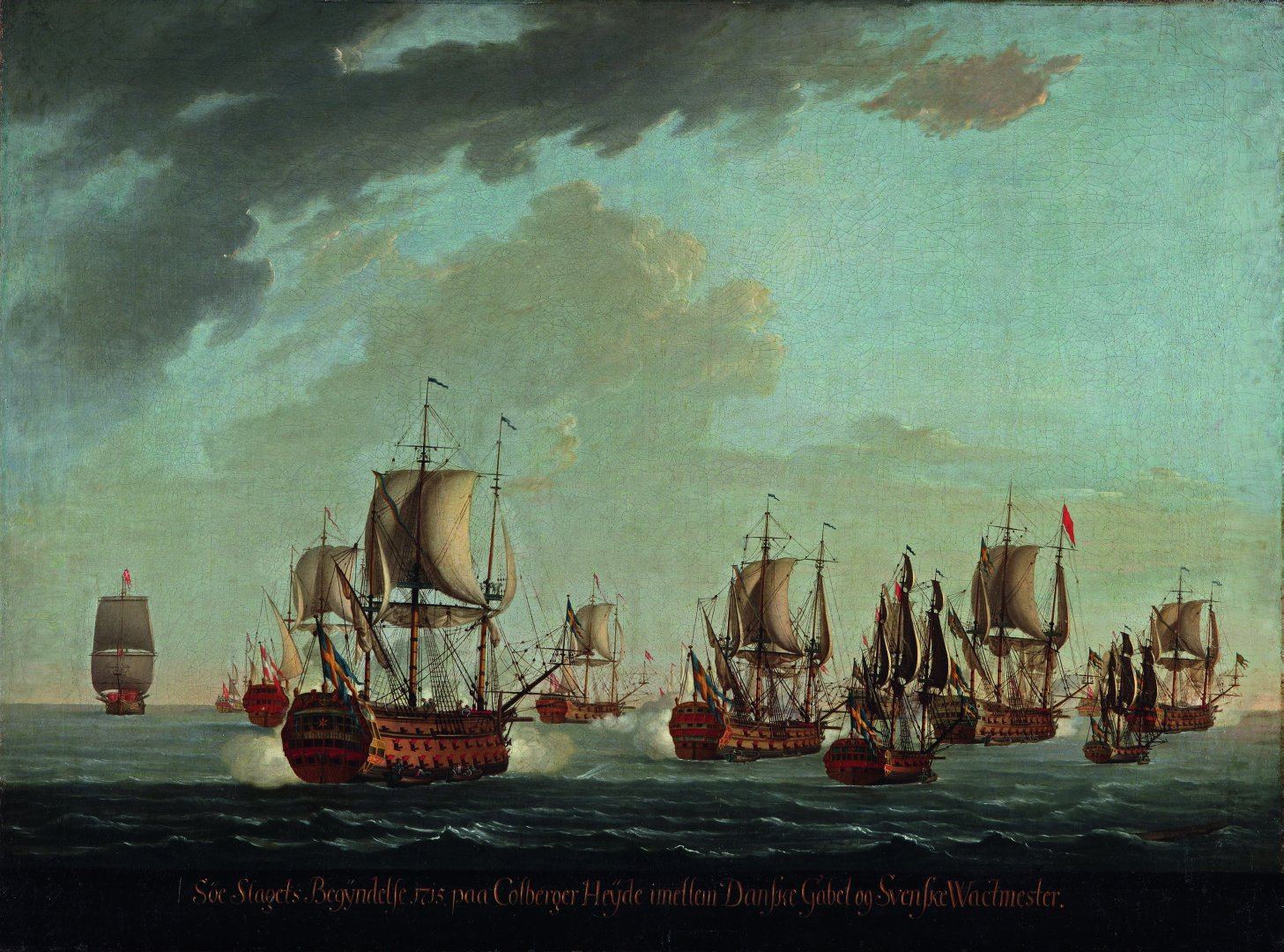
- Battle of Fehmarn, 1715
Date	13 April 1715 (O.S.); 24 April 1715 (N.S.)
Location	Fehmarn Belt, between Denmark and Germany
Result	Danish victory

Belligerents
(yes) Swedish Empire	Denmark–Norway

Commanders and leaders
Carl Hans Wachtmeister	Christian Carl Gabel

Strength
4 ships of the line 2 frigates	8 ships of the line 3 frigates 4 smaller vessels

Casualties and losses
353 killed and wounded 1,875 captured 1 ship scuttled 5 ships captured	66 killed 226 wounded

The Battle of Fehmarn was a naval battle took place on 24 April 1715 (N.S.), during the Great Northern War. It was a victory for a Danish squadron under Gabel, which captured five of the six Swedish ships under Wachtmeister at the cost of 66 dead and 226 wounded.

== Ships involved ==
=== Denmark (Gabel) ===
==== Ships of the line ====
- Flagship Prinds Christian (66) under Christian Carl Gabel
- Prinds Carl (50) under Evert Deichman
- Prinds Wilhelm (50) under Seneca Christophersen Hagedorn
- Delmenhorst (50) under Michael Bille
- Fyen (52) under Wiglas von Schindel
- Island (50) under Johan Anthon von Paulsen
- Nældebladet (50) under Hans Kaas
- Laaland (50) under Søren Heyer

==== Frigates ====
- Højenhald (30) under Christian von Güntelberg
- Raae (34?) under Gerhard Siewertz
- Løvendals Gallej (20?) under Peter Wessel

==== Smaller vessels ====
- Ræven (snow) under P. J. Stavanger
- West Vlieland (galiot) under Svend Bruun
- Eyland Schilling (galiot) under A. Green
- One fireship

=== Sweden (Wachtmeister) ===
==== Ships of the line ====
- Flagship Princessa Hedvig Sophia (74) under Carl Hans Wachtmeister - Aground, captured next day and later scuttled
- Nordstjerna (60) under Gustaf Wilhelm von Gertten - Aground, captured next day
- Södermanland (60) under Zacharias Åberg - Aground, captured next day
- Göteborg (54) under Gustaf Fredrik Leijonancker - Aground, captured next day

==== Frigates ====
- Vita Örn (30) under Johan Casper Printz - Aground, captured next day
- Falken (30) under Mikael Spalding - Aground, captured next day

== Sources ==
- Generalstaben (1922). Bidrag til den store nordiske krigs historie: Erobringen af Sverigs tyske provinser 1715–1716 [Contribution to the history of the Great Northern War: The conquest of Sweden's German provinces 1715–1716] (in Danish). Vol. 7. Copenhagen / Oslo: Gyldendalske Boghandel, Nordisk Forlag. pp. 13, 15–16, 19, 26–32. OCLC 488001949.
- Glete, Jan (2010). Swedish Naval Administration, 1521–1721. Resource, Flows and Organisational Capabilities. Leiden / Boston: Brill. pp. 219–220. ISBN 978-90-04-17916-5.
