= HDMS Ørnen (1694) =

HDMS Ørnen (1694) (also known as Sorte Ørn - the black eagle) was a frigate in the Royal Danish Navy active during the Great Northern War

Launched on 17 November 1694 in Copenhagen (Nyholm), this frigate had been built to a design by Schøits. With a crew of 70, and armed with twenty four-pound cannon, she had a length of 90 (Danish) feet, breadth of 21 feet and a draft of 11 feet 4 inches.

In 1709, under the command of Michael Bille (1680-1756), she captured numerous Swedish ships in the neighbourhood of Bornholm.
From April 1710 the captain was senior lieutenant Christian Güntelberg, with his ship collecting copper from Norway in 1711. Commodore Frantz Trojel took passage on Ørnen that year to organise the collection of naval recruits for the fleet.
Friderich von Rehdern, an officer trained largely in Holland, was captain of this ship from 1712 operating in the Baltic squadron of Vice Admiral Barfœd, and later in the Danish main fleet under Gyldenløve. Employed on convoy duties in the Baltic for three years, the ship was captured near Rügen by the Swedish frigate Vita Örn (White Eagle) captained by Johan Casper Printz.

== Fate ==
The ship was captured by the Swedes on 12 April 1715

== Citations ==
- (in Danish)Project Runeberg : C F Bricka on Mikkel Bille in Danish Biographical Dictionary
- Royal Danish Naval Museum website – Skibregister
- (in Danish)T. A. Topsøe-Jensen og Emil Marquard (1935) “Officerer i den dansk-norske Søetat 1660–1814 og den danske Søetat 1814–1932" (Danish Naval Officers). Two volumes Volume 1 and Volume 2.
