= Otto Fredrikson =

Finnish footballer (born 1981)

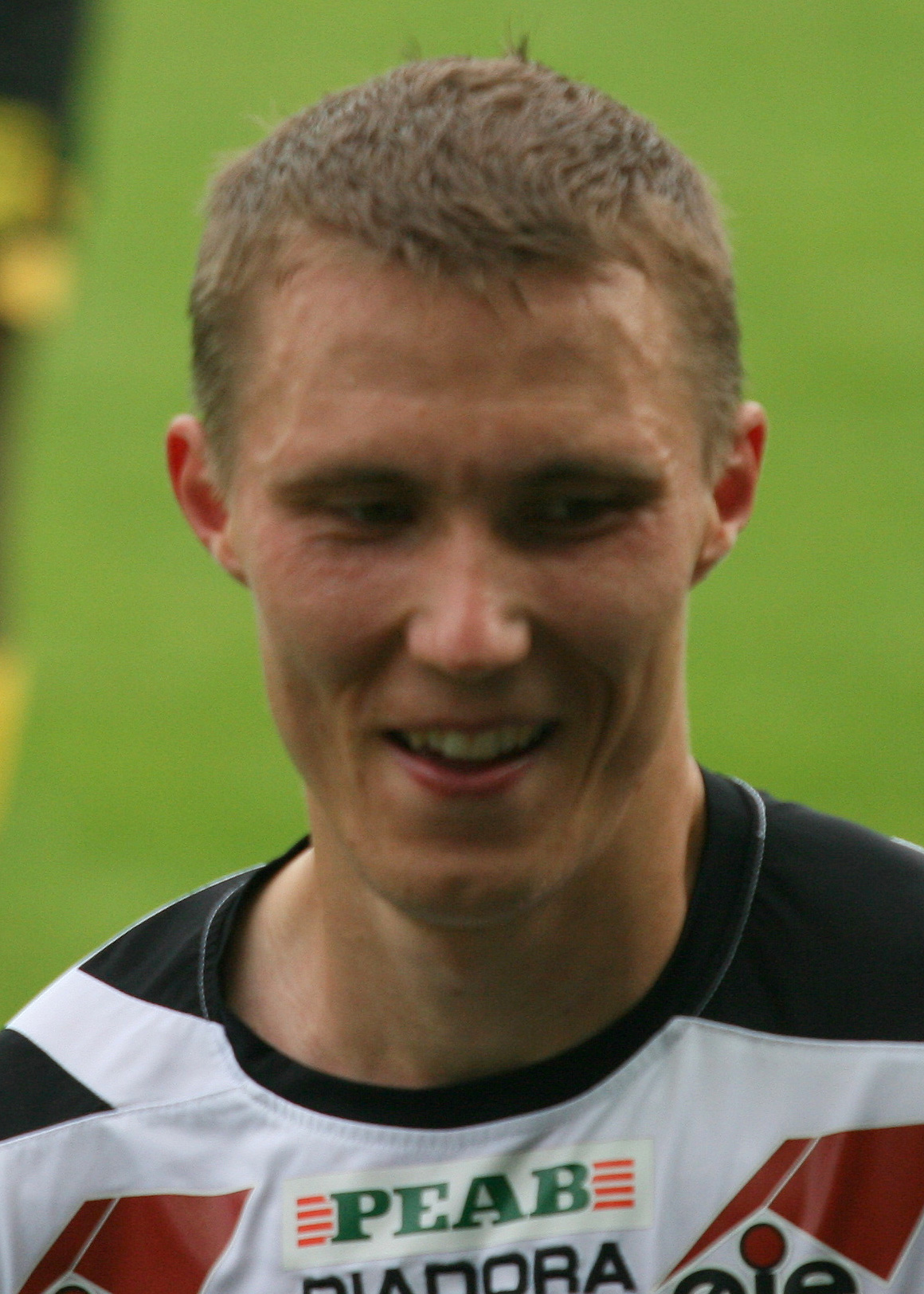

Personal information
- Full name: Otto Henrik Fredrikson
- Date of birth: 30 November 1981 (age 44)
- Place of birth: Valkeakoski, Finland
- Height: 1.89 m (6 ft 2 in)
- Position: Goalkeeper

Youth career
- 1990–1995: Haka

Senior career*
Years	Team	Apps	(Gls)
1995–1999	OLS Oulu		
2000–2001	Tervarit Oulu	40	(0)
2002–2006	Borussia M'gladbach	0	(0)
2002–2003	→ Borussia M'gladbach II	15	(0)
2004–2005	→ Jaro (loan)	52	(0)
2006–2009	Lillestrøm	53	(0)
2010–2012	Spartak Nalchik	48	(0)
2014–2015	Lørenskog	3	(0)
2015–2017	Kongsvinger	39	(0)
2015	→ Vålerenga (loan)	2	(0)
2017	Tromsø IL	0	(0)

International career
2001–2003	Finland U21	12	(0)
2008–2011	Finland	13	(0)

Managerial career
- 2017: Tromsø IL (staff)
Medal record
Lillestrøm SK
Winner	Norwegian Football Cup	2007
- * Club domestic league appearances and goals

Otto Henrik Fredrikson (born 30 November 1981) is a Finnish former football goalkeeper. Fredrikson was born in the unilingually Finnish-speaking municipality of Valkeakoski, but has Swedish heritage.

== Club career ==
=== Tervarit ===
Fredrikson's career began in OLS, but he transferred to another Oulu based team Tervarit for seasons 2000–2001.

=== Borussia Mönchengladbach ===
During season 2001–02, he transferred to German Borussia Mönchengladbach. Fredrikson was at that time one of the most promising footballers in Finland. He represented Borussia Mönchengladbach until season 2005–06. During the years in Borussia he did not gain any caps in the first team, but did gain 15 caps in the reserves team. During seasons 2004 and 2005 he was loaned to Finnish club FF Jaro where he played 52 matches.

=== Lillestrøm ===
From 2006 to 2009, Fredrikson represented Norwegian club Lillestrøm. He gained 53 caps.

=== Spartak Nalchik ===
In February 2010, Fredrikson transferred to Russian PFK Spartak Nalchik. He made 48 appearances in the Russian league before suffering an injury in international friendly match between Finland and Turkey on 2012.

He did not re-emerge until 2014, when joining Lørenskog at the Norwegian third tier. In 2015, he signed for Kongsvinger, also a third-tier team, albeit formerly in the Norwegian Premier League. In the summer of 2015 he signed for Vålerenga on an emergency loan deal because Michael Langer was injured and Lars Hirschfeld is playing Gold Cup for Canada.

== International career ==
He made his debut for the Finnish national team on 29 May 2008 against Turkey. After Jussi Jääskeläinen announced his retirement from international football, Fredrikson was the number one choice for Finland. During fall 2010, he started three out of four of Finland's Euro 2012 qualification games. However, Fredrikson has been away from the squad since May 2012, when he got injured before the friendly match against Turkey.

== Club statistics ==
As of 25 November 2016

Club	Season	Division	League		Cup		Europe		Total	
Club	Season	Division	Apps	Goals	Apps	Goals	Apps	Goals	Apps	Goals
OLS	1995	Kakkonen								
OLS	1996	Kakkonen								
OLS	1997	Kakkonen								
OLS	1998	Kakkonen								
OLS	1999	Kakkonen								
OLS	Total		25	0	0	0	0	0	25	0
Tervarit	2000	Ykkönen								
Tervarit	2001	Ykkönen								
Tervarit	Total		40	0	0	0	0	0	40	0
Borussia Mönchengladbach	2001–02	Bundesliga	0	0	0	0	0	0	0	0
Borussia Mönchengladbach	2002–03	Bundesliga	0	0	0	0	0	0	0	0
Borussia Mönchengladbach	Total		0	0	0	0	0	0	0	0
Borussia Mönchengladbach II	2001–02	Oberliga Nordrhein	5	0	0	0	–		5	0
Borussia Mönchengladbach II	2002-03	Oberliga Nordrhein	9	0	0	0	–		9	0
Borussia Mönchengladbach II	2003-04	Oberliga Nordrhein	1	0	0	0	–		1	0
Borussia Mönchengladbach II	Total		15	0	0	0	0	0	15	0
Jaro (loan)	2004	Veikkausliiga	26	0	0	0	–		26	0
Jaro (loan)	2005	Veikkausliiga	26	0	0	0	–		26	0
Jaro (loan)	Total		52	0	0	0	0	0	52	0
Lillestrøm	2006	Tippeligaen	2	0	1	0	1 (Note: Includes UEFA Intertoto Cup)	0	4	0
Lillestrøm	2007	Tippeligaen	13	0	5	0	1 (Note: Includes UEFA Cup)	0	19	0
Lillestrøm	2008	Tippeligaen	19	0	2	0	1	0	22	0
Lillestrøm	2009	Tippeligaen	19	0	3	0	0	0	22	0
Lillestrøm	Total		53	0	11	0	3	0	67	0
PFC Spartak Nalchik	2010	Russian Premier League	22	0	0	0	0	0	22	0
PFC Spartak Nalchik	2011–12	Russian Premier League	26	0	0	0	0	0	26	0
PFC Spartak Nalchik	Total		48	0	0	0	0	0	48	0
Lørenskog	2014	2. divisjon	3	0	0	0	0	0	3	0
Kongsvinger	2015	2.divisjon	10	0	0	0	0	0	10	0
Vålerenga (loan)	2015	Tippeligaen	2	0	0	0	0	0	2	0
Kongsvinger	2016	1. divisjon	29	0	4	0	0	0	33	0
Tromsø IL	2017	Eliteserien	0	0	0	0	–		0	0
Career total			277	0	15	0	3	0	295	0

As of 16 November 2011

Finland national team
Year	Apps	Goals
2008	2	0
2009	1	0
2010	7	0
2011	3	0
Total	13	0

== Honours ==
=== Club ===
Lillestrøm

- Norwegian Football Cup: 2007
