= Ljungbyholm =

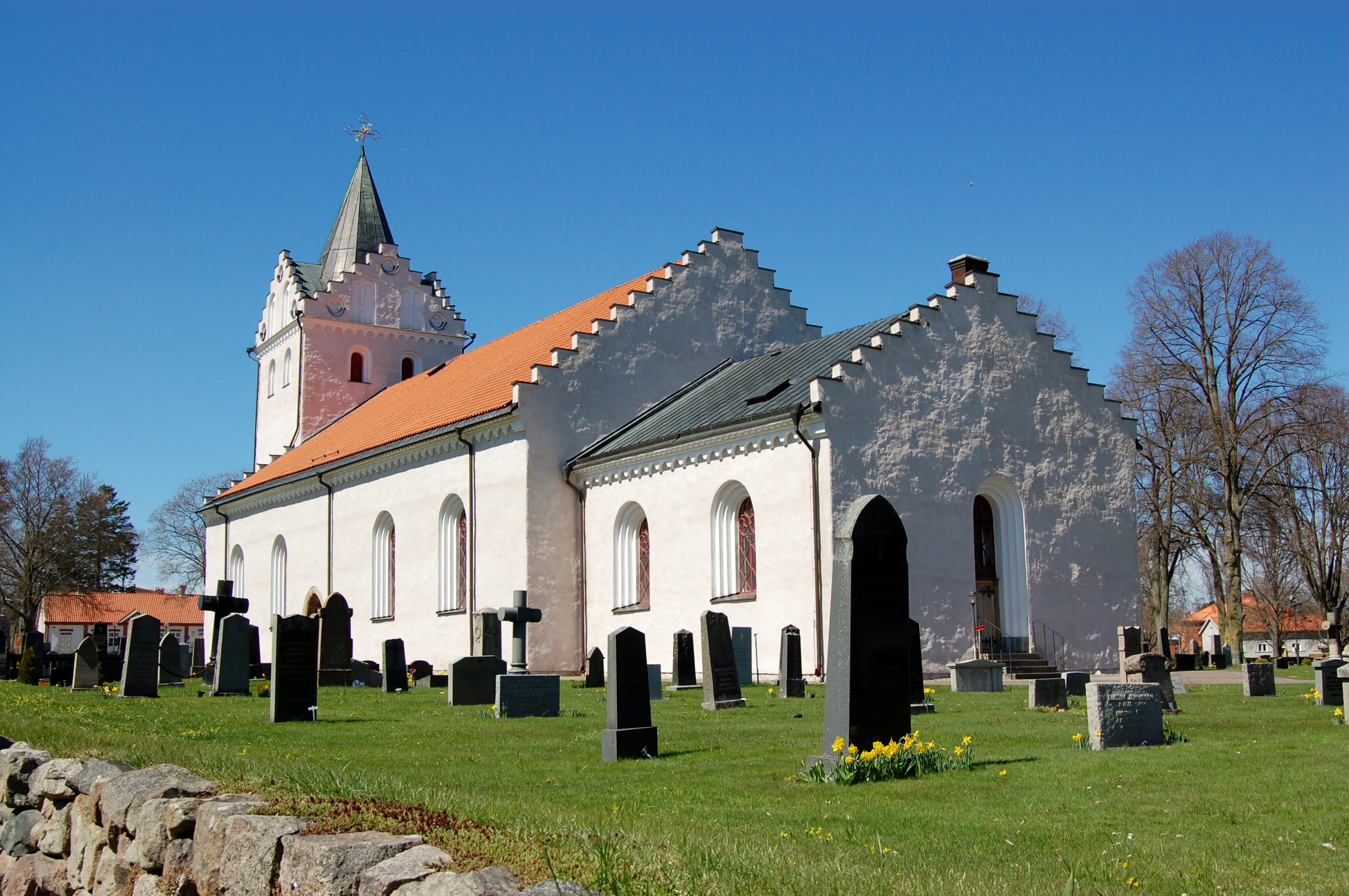

- Location within Kalmar Location within Sweden
- Coordinates: 56°38′N 16°10′E
- Country: Sweden
- Province: Småland
- County: Kalmar County
- Municipality: Kalmar Municipality

Area
  - Total: 1.72 km^{2} (0.66 sq mi)

Population (31 December 2010)
  - Total: 1,604
  - Density: 933/km^{2} (2,420/sq mi)
- Time zone: UTC+1 (CET)
  - Summer (DST): UTC+2 (CEST)

Ljungbyholm is a locality situated in Kalmar Municipality, Kalmar County, Sweden, with 1,604 inhabitants in 2010.
