= Christian Carl Gabel =

Danish vice admiral, Chief Secretary of War and Director of the Royal Dano-Norwegian Navy

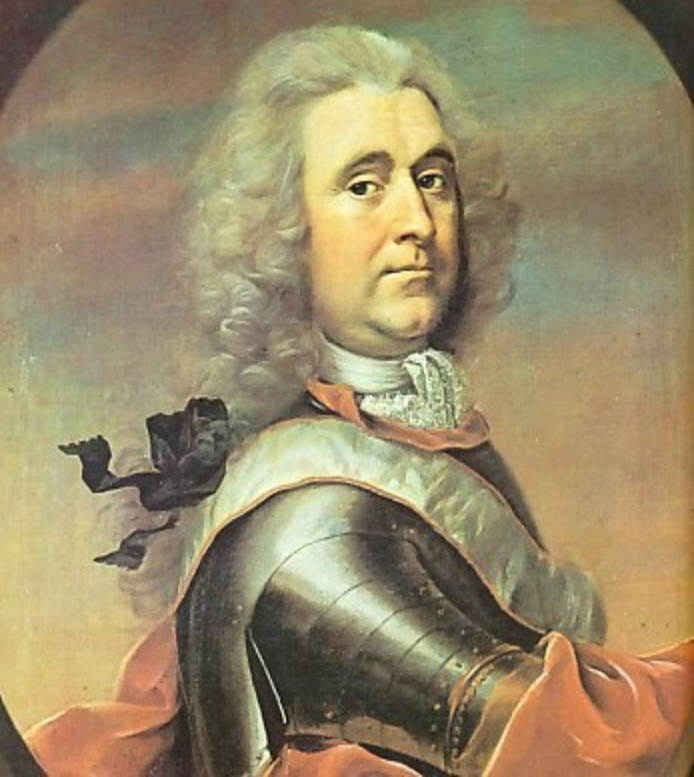
Christian Carl Gabel.

Christian Carl Gabel (10 November 1679 — 3 August 1748) was a Danish naval officer who later served as Secretary of War and Director of the Royal Dano-Norwegian Navy and Holmen Naval Base. Prior to that, he had reached the rank of vice admiral after distinguishing himself in the Great Northern War. After falling out of favour at the court, in 1725 he was sent to Jutland as diocesan governor of Ribe and county governor of Riberhus. He was a major landowner but had to sell most of his estates in the middle of the 1730s.

== Early life and education ==
Gabel was born on 10 November 1679 in Copenhagen, the son of Frederik Gabel and Anne Cathrine Ovcsdatter Juul. In 1696, he enrolled at the Knight's Academy.

== Career ==
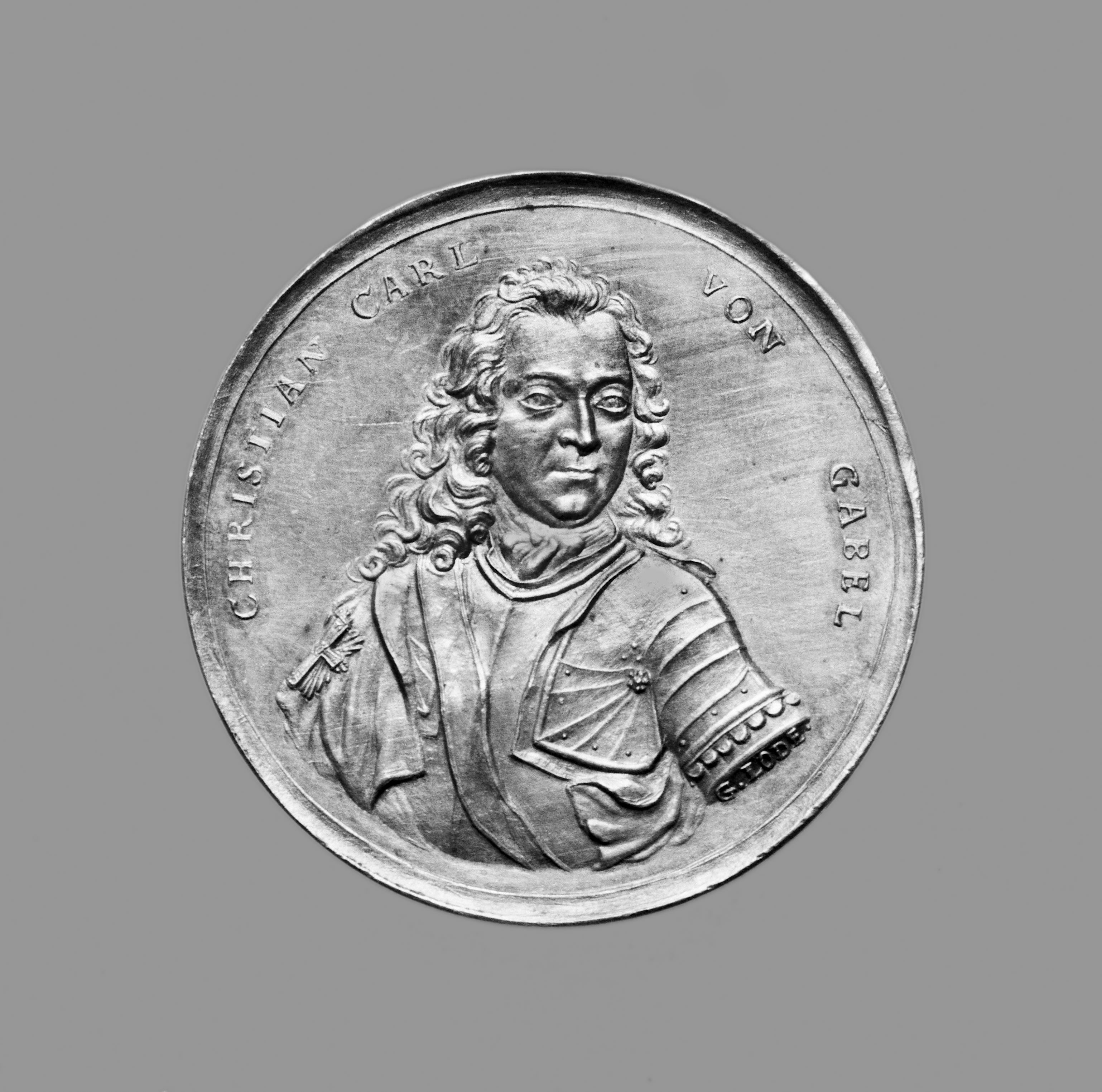
Gabel seen on a medal struck in remembrance of his victory in the Battle of Fehmarn, 1815.

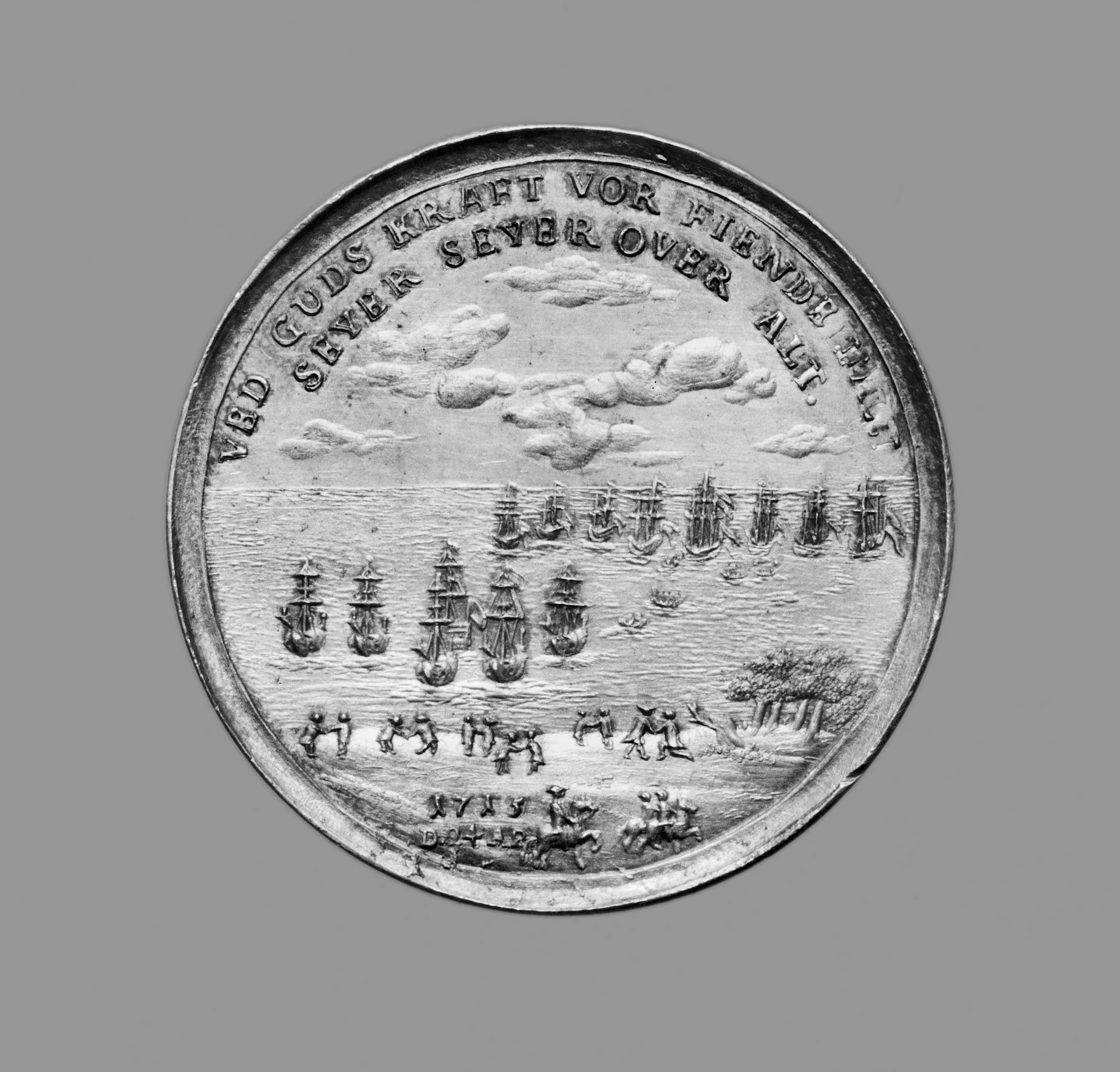
The rear side of the medal.

Gabel started his career in the navy, becoming a captain lieutenant in 1700 and captain in 1704. He later entered court service, becoming a kammerjunker in 1708. In 1708–1709, he served as county governor of the Faroe Islands. In 1710, he was promoted to commander captain. He distinguished himself in the Battle of Fehmarn, Battle of Rügen, and several other naval engagements. On 15 May 1715, he was promoted to vice admiral. From 4 June 1717 to 18 October 1725, he served as Chief Secretary of War. From 1721, he was president of the Danish Admiralty. He was also admitted to the Kommissariatskollegiet. From 14 July 1721 to 29 October 1725, he also served as director of the navy and Golmen. On 18 June 1717, he was created a Knight of the Order of the Dannebrog.

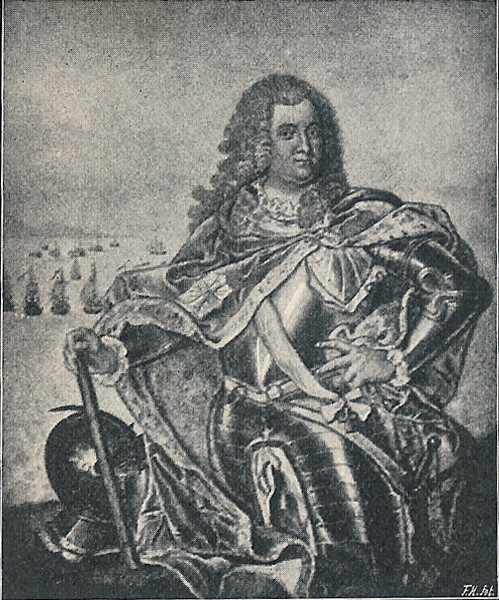
Christian Carl Gabel

Gabel fell out of favor at the court in the middle of the 1720s. He was dismissed from all his posts and sent to Jutland as Diocesan Governor of Tibe and county governor of Riberhus. He held these offices from 24 November 1725 until his death.

== Property ==
In 1709, Gabel bought Bregentved from his father's estate. In 1718, he sold it to the crown. His other holdings included Christiansdal, Oregård and Enggård on Funen, Giesegaard, Ringsted Abbey and Spanager on Zealand and Bramming in Jutland.

In around 1735, Gabel had to part with most of his estates. Facing financial difficulties, he was forced to take a loan from Countess Anna Sophie Schack in 1726. In 1736, she took over Giesegaard.

== Personal life ==
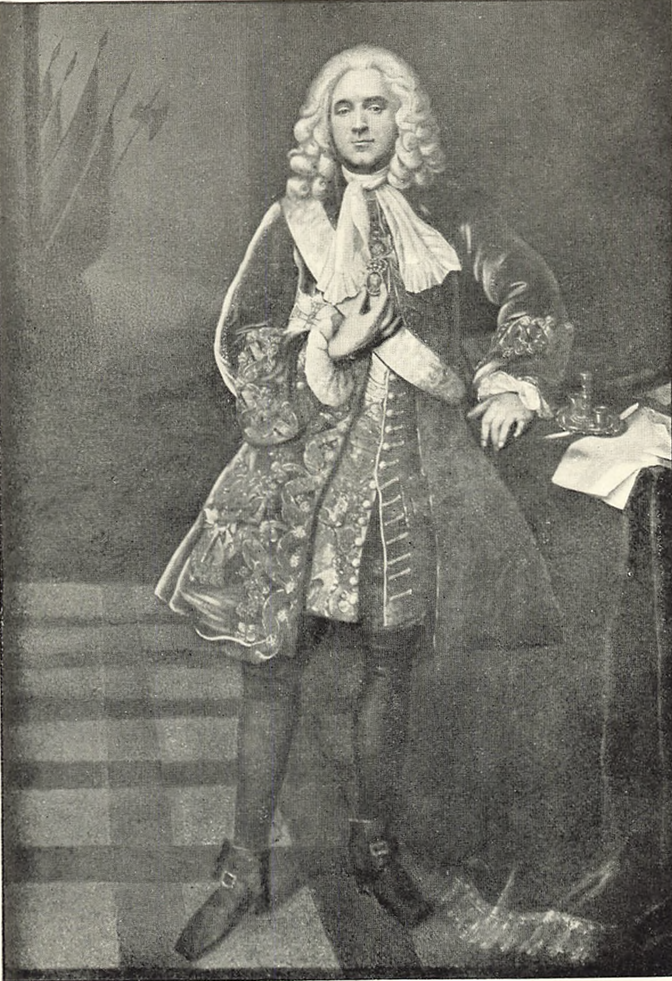
Christian Carl Gabel

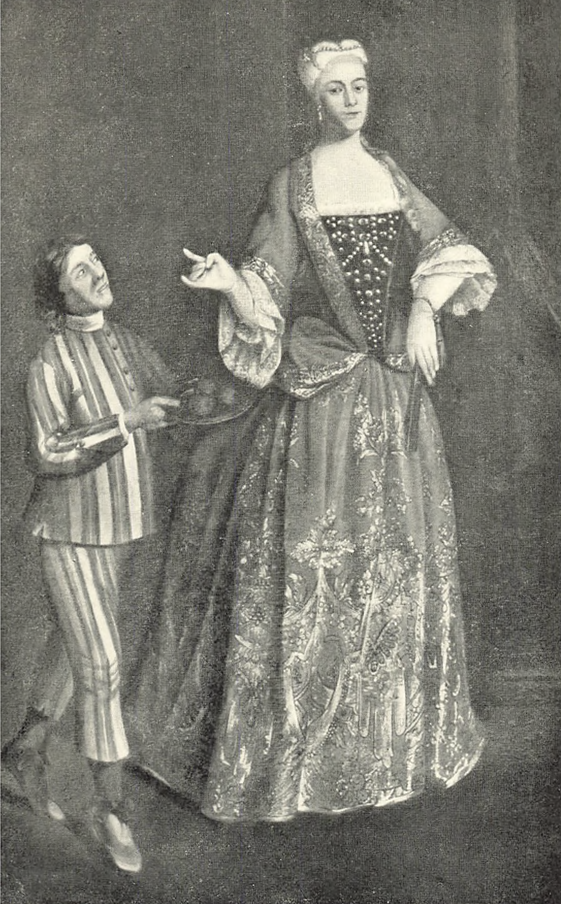
Frederikke Christiane Gabel, née Schult

In 1710, Gabel was married to Frederikke Christiane Schult (c. 1685–1731). She was the daughter of gehejmeråd Diderik Schult (1644–1704) and Ermegaard Sophie Gabel (died 1719).

Following the death of his first wife, Gabel remarried on 28 April 1732 to Anna Benedicte Steensen (1685–1756). She was the widow of general lieutenant Christian Rantzau-Friis (1682–1731). Her parents were colonel lieutenant Erik Steensen (1646–c. 1707) and Vibeke Urne (1654–1714).

Gabel died on 3 August 1748. He is buried in Bramminge Church.

== Awards ==
On 3 May 1715, Gabel was appointed chamberlain. In 1731, he was created a White Knight and awarded the title of gehejmeråd.
