= Admiralty Board of Sweden =

The Admiralty Board of Sweden (Amiralitetskollegiet) was created in 1634 and existed until 1791. In 1803, the Admiralty Board in its administrative capacity was revived under the name of the Förvaltningen av sjöärendena. In 1878 it was reorganized under the new name of the Kungliga marinförvaltningen which existed until 1968 when it was disbanded and amalgamated into the Försvarets materielverk.

== The Board 1634-1680 ==
The Lord High Admiral of Sweden (Riksamiralen) was in 1620 provided with an admiral as assistant, and in 1630 another one, who all together constituted the "Admiralty"; a transitional form to the Admiralty Board which was established through the Instrument of Government Act of 1634. The Board was first located in Stockholm, at Skeppsholmen, but was moved to the new naval station in Karlskrona in 1680. After undergoing several administrative changes, which at times greatly limited its authority, it was moved back to Stockholm in 1776 and ceased to exist in 1791. In 1803, the Admiralty Board in its administrative capacity was revived under the name of the Administration of Naval Affairs (Förvaltningen av sjöärendena), which in 1878 was reorganized under the new name of the Naval Administration (Marinförvaltningen).

From 1636 the Board contained the lord high admiral as president, two admirals who were members of the council of the realm (riksamiralietsråd), three other admirals (amiralitetsråd) and a civilian commissioner överkommissarie). All matters were to be decided by the board, and neither the lord high admiral nor any of the members were allowed to alone decide or command on behalf of the board. The board's mission was the maintenance of the fleet, the recruiting, arming, training and maintenance of the ships' crews, and the justice and trial of the persons and matters which fell under the jurisdiction of the Admiralty.

== The Board 1680-1720 ==
After the introduction of the Royal absolutism of Charles XI, the office of lord high admiral was abolished, and the Royal instruction of 1689 ruled that the board was to contain the Admiral General as president and two admirals members, who as a board whould decide all matters; naval operations as well administration and finances. Members of the board of admiralty were the King's faithful servants, Admiral General Hans Wachtmeister, Admiral Erik Carlsson Sjöblad and Admiral Hans Clerck, who each commanded on of the Navy's three squadrons. But as the admirals were divided between the naval stations at Stockholm, Karlskrona and Kalmar, most decisions were made by Wachtmeister. In 1690, a civilian admiralty commissioner (överkommissarie) was added to the board, and in 1692 a separate admiralty treasury (statskammarkontor) was added. The Admiral General remained responsible to the King in all respects for the management of the fleet, but his authority was circumscribed. In matters of command he was bound by the decisions of the Board, the management of shipbuilding and equipment had to be carried out in cooperation between the Board and admiralty treasury, and in matters of finances he had at his side the expertise of the civilian commissioner.

In 1713, Charles XII issued new instructions, that changed the Boards composition. All flag officers of the navy, except the commanding admiral of Skeppsholmen, who was "spared" became members of the board. In addition to the civilian commissioner the civilian admiralty treasurer (amiralitetskammarråd) was also added to the membership of the Board. The King was concerned with the lacking efficacy of the navy, and appointed Lieutenant General Hans Henrik von Liewen to president of the Board as well as of the admiralty treasury, although he did not have to serve at sea. A number of more or less successful detailed administrative reorganizations were carried out on the orders of the King, who was abroad in the field without closer contact with the fleet. In 1715, the admiralty treasury were put under the Board, yet in 1717 again made independent as the Admiralty Commissary (amiralitetskommissariet) under Von Liewen as director and sole decision maker.

== The Board 1720-1772 ==
The reorganizations of Charles XII did not long survive his death; already the Diet of 1719 abolished them. The Instrument of Government Act of 1720 In the form of government of 1720, the admiral general was replaced by a president, and the board was to contain all flag officers present in Karlskrona. In 1728 it was decided that the board was to contain a president, two admirals as naval members and two civilian treasurers as civilian members. The instructions of 1735 maintained that organization, although with the addition of a chief commissioner when economic matters were deliberated; during war, another chief commissioner would be appointed and be a member of the board. Within the board, decisions were made by majority vote, with the president having the casting vote in the event of a tie.

The admiralty treasury of 1692 was reestablished in 1720, yet already in 1722 reorganized as the Navy Board (amiralitetsgeneralkommissariet) and made independent of the Admiralty Board. The director, Nils Ehrenschiöld, no longer head of the admiralty board, was president and two chief commissioners were members. The various offices and the commissariats in Stockholm and Gothenburg were subordinate to the navy board. In 1728 the admiralty board was given general supervision of the navy board. When Ehrenschiöld died in 1728, the commander of the Gothenburg Squadron, Admiral Jonas Fredrik Örnfelt, was appointed director of the navy board. The diets of 1731 and 1734 nevertheless decided that the navy board should be abolished and its mission transferred to the admiralty board.

In 1756 an Archipelago Fleet which was not under the command of the Navy and the admiralty board based in Karlskrona was created. Instead it was placed under the command of the army, with a squadron in Stockholm and a Finnish squadron in Helsinki. General Augustin Ehrensvärd was appointed commander of the fleet. Due to the Pomeranian War regulations for the administration of the archipelago fleet was not issued until 1763, when an ordnance- and administrative office was created in Stockholm. Specific provisions regulated the relationship with the Board of War, which had oversight of the entire administration of the archipelago fleet and of which the general of the archipelago fleet was a member. The ordnance- and administrative office on Skeppsholmen to be considered part of the board of war. The commanding general stood directly under the King and was responsible to him for the administration of the fleet. The Caps had, however, a majority at the Diet of 1766, and the archipelago fleet was returned to the Navy and the Admiralty Board. Vice Admiral Christopher Falkengréen became its new commanding officer. Yet, when the Hats regained majority at the Diet of 1769, the Finnish Squadron was returned to the army, and Field Marshal Ehrensvärd appointed its commander.

== The Board 1772-1791 ==
Gustav III issued new instructions for the Board in 1773. It was relieved of all responsibility concereing operations and finances, but it was to have oversight, control and care of the entire naval establishment. Its supervision included the archipelago fleet in Stockholm and the squadron in Gothenburg. The beacon and pilotage services, including the nautical charting service, and the diving service remained under the board. The Board was to consist of three admirals, one as president and two as naval members, all flag officers present at Karslkrona, two admiralty treasury councilors and a chief commissioner. The president, the naval members and the civilian members handled the ordinary business; the flag officers were only summoned when such matters arose that concerned the defense of the realm at sea. In 1776 the seat of the Board was moved to Stockholm. The chief commissary was no longer a member of the board but would remain in Karlskorna, which still was the Navy's main station. Criticism of the Board in combination with the King's strategic ambitions led to the creation of a single cocmmander of the Navy and the Archipelago fleet in the form of an General Admiral (Generalamiralsämbetet) in 1780. The General Admiral was the immediate superior of the commanding admirals and took his orders directly from the King. The commander of the archipelago fleet, Major General Henrik af Trolle was appointed General Admiral. Only the dockyard in Karlskrona and the Cadet Corps remained under the direct command of the president of the Admiralty Board, Admiral Abraham Falkengreen. In 1784, Henrik af Trolle died and was succeeded by Colonel Karl August Ehrensvärd of the Archipelago Fleet, with the same powers but under the title of Chief Admiral (Överamiral). However, in anticipation of the impending war against Russia, the King in 1788 entrusted the navy's equipment to several consecutive commissions, the last of which were appointed in 1789 under the chairmanship of Adolf Fredrik Munck. The General Admiral became in reality a subordinate of the commissions and Ehrensvärd resigned in disgust in 1790.

== Administration of Naval Affairs 1791-1878 ==
The Admiralty Board was abolished in 1791 and was replaced with a new organization the following year. The leadership of the navy rested with three officers, a naval admiral, a dockyard admiral and a quartermaster general each directly subordinate to the King and autonomous in relation to each other within their respective departments. The naval admiral was the commander-in-chief of the fleet and under him were the military and ecclesiastical departments as well as the naval schools. He mustered and paid off all crews, whether for naval expeditions or for work at the naval statio. Under the command of the dockyard admiral was the construction department. The primary officers in his department were the ordnance officer, the master attendant and the surveyor of the navy. In the office of the quartermaster general all matters that belonged to the general management of the navy were combined. A general naval office (Generalsjömilitiekontoret) was created to administer the finances of both the Navy and the Archipelago fleet. After the King's death in 1792, the old organization returned under the name of the Office of the General Admiral; the resigned Chief Admiral Karl August Ehrensvärd was appointed to fill the position.

The joint command of the navy and the archipelago fleet was abolished in 1794 with the creation of separate Grand Admiral offices, one for the Navy in Karlskrona and one for the Archipelago fleet in Stockholm; the only connection was the common grand admiral, Duke Charles. Yet, this organization was soon rejected. It was found to be too impractical and time-consuming to have separate administrations for the country's fleets. A joint board for both fleets was then established in Stockholm in 1803 under the name of the Management of the Naval Affairs (Förvaltningen av sjöärendena), whose authority in 1805 was limited to handling only economic matters, while naval matters were assigned to the Admiral in command of the Navy in Karlskrona and the Commanding General of the Archipelago fleet. During the years 1813–15, the highest military command for both fleets was entrusted to an Admiral General.

In 1824, the navy proper and the archipelago fleet was combined to form a new service, called Kunglig Majestäts flotta (Kungl. Maj:ts flotta). The Management of the Naval Affairs continued to be the administrative agency of the new navy. A flag officer, with the title of head of the management of naval affairs, would lead the presidium of this agency, in which three naval officers of at least the rank of commander and two senior civilian councilors would be members. The director of pilotage and the head of the construction corps were also members, but were only allowed to vote when decisions concerning their departments were taken. The creation of a new Office of the Grand Admiral, which existed 1827–1841, with Crown Prince Oscar as grand admiral, did not change the scope of the Management of the Naval Affairs. In 1866 it was again decided to split Kungl. Maj:ts flotta in two services, the navy proper (Flottan) and the archipelago artillery (Skärgårdsartilleriet). Both services continued to be administrated by the Management of the Naval Affairs, and in 1873 they were merged under the name Kungliga Flottan. In 1878, Förvaltningen av sjöärendena was replaced with a new agency, the Kungliga marinförvaltningen.
