= 2014 Vålerenga Fotball season =

Vålerenga
2014 season
- Chairman: Odd Skarheim
- Manager: Kjetil Rekdal
- Stadium: Ullevaal Stadion
- Tippeligaen: 6th
- Norwegian Cup: Fourth Round vs Odd
- Top goalscorer: League: Viðar Örn Kjartansson (25); All: Viðar Örn Kjartansson (31)
- Highest home attendance: 15,437 vs Strømsgodset (1 May 2014)
- Lowest home attendance: 7,211 vs Sogndal (5 October 2014)
- Average home league attendance: 9,608
Home colours	Away colours	Third colours

Vålerenga Fotball is a Norwegian association football club from Oslo. They play their home games at Ullevaal Stadion which has a capacity of 28,972. During the 2014/15 campaign they will compete in the following competitions: Tippeligean, NM Cupen.

== Squad ==
Note: Flags indicate national team as defined under FIFA eligibility rules; some limited exceptions apply. Players may hold more than one non-FIFA nationality.

No.	Pos.	Nation	Player
1	GK	CAN	Lars Hirschfeld
2	DF	NOR	Niklas Gunnarsson
3	DF	NOR	Ruben Kristiansen
4	DF	NOR	André Muri
5	DF	SWE	Rasmus Lindkvist
6	DF	NOR	Simon Larsen
7	FW	NOR	Daniel Fredheim Holm
8	MF	NOR	Sivert Nilsen
10	FW	ISL	Viðar Örn Kjartansson
11	MF	NOR	Morten Berre
14	MF	NOR	Herman Stengel
15	DF	NOR	Max Jakob Bjørsvik
17	MF	NOR	Ghayas Zahid
19	MF	NOR	Christian Grindheim (Captain)
20	DF	NOR	Anders Plassen
21	MF	NOR	Alexander Mathisen

No.	Pos.	Nation	Player
24	DF	DEN	Nicolai Høgh
25	MF	NOR	Markus Brændsrød
26	DF	NOR	Simen Olafsen
27	MF	NOR	Rino Falk Larsen
29	DF	NOR	Svein Marius Koss
30	GK	AUT	Michael Langer
35	DF	NOR	Kamran Ali Iqbal
36	MF	NOR	Mathias Blårud
37	DF	NOR	Ivan Näsberg
38	MF	NOR	Fitim Kastrati
39	MF	NOR	Moussa Nije
40	GK	NOR	Marcus Engebretsen
41	GK	NOR	Nima Danai
42	DF	NOR	Markus Lund Nakkim
43	DF	NOR	Dadi Dodou Gaye

=== On Loan ===
Note: Flags indicate national team as defined under FIFA eligibility rules; some limited exceptions apply. Players may hold more than one non-FIFA nationality.

No. / Pos. / Nation / Player; 22 / FW / CRC / Diego Calvo (at IFK Göteborg)	No. / Pos. / Nation / Player; 28 / FW / NOR / Riki Alba (at Nest-Sotra)

== Transfers ==
=== Winter ===
In: Note: Flags indicate national team as defined under FIFA eligibility rules; some limited exceptions apply. Players may hold more than one non-FIFA nationality.

No.	Pos.	Nation	Player
2	DF	NOR	Niklas Gunnarsson (from (Norway) Odd)
3	DF	NOR	Ruben Kristiansen (from (Norway) Tromsø)
6	DF	NOR	Simon Larsen (loan return from (Norway) Hønefoss)
8	MF	NOR	Sivert Heltne Nilsen (from (Norway) Hødd)
10	FW	ISL	Viðar Örn Kjartansson (from (Iceland) Fylkir)
14	MF	NOR	Herman Stengel (from (Norway) Stabæk)
17	MF	NOR	Ghayas Zahid (loan return from (Norway) Ull/Kisa)
21	FW	NOR	Alexander Mathisen (from (Norway) Hønefoss)
—	DF	SWE	Rasmus Lindqvist (from (Sweden) Östersund)
—	FW	NOR	Chuma Anene (loan return from (Norway) Stabæk)

Out: Note: Flags indicate national team as defined under FIFA eligibility rules; some limited exceptions apply. Players may hold more than one non-FIFA nationality.

No.	Pos.	Nation	Player
2	DF	SWE	Joseph Baffo (to (Sweden) Halmstad)
5	DF	CZE	Jan Lecjaks (loan return to (Switzerland) Young Boys)
8	MF	NOR	Jan Gunnar Solli (to (Sweden) Hammarby)
10	FW	NOR	Torgeir Børven (to (Netherlands) Twente)
13	MF	NGR	Fegor Ogude (to (Russia) Amkar Perm)
15	DF	NOR	Joachim Thomassen (to (Norway) Sarpsborg 08)
18	DF	CRC	Giancarlo González (to (United States) Columbus Crew)
26	MF	SRB	Bojan Zajić (to (Norway) Sarpsborg 08)
27	FW	NOR	Chuma Anene (to (Norway) Ull-Kisa)
33	DF	POL	Marcel Wawrzynkiewicz (to (Poland) Cracovia)
35	FW	NOR	Monir Benmoussa (to (Norway) Bærum)
—	FW	NOR	Shåresh Ahmadi (to (Norway) Ull-Kisa)

=== Summer ===
In: Note: Flags indicate national team as defined under FIFA eligibility rules; some limited exceptions apply. Players may hold more than one non-FIFA nationality.

No.	Pos.	Nation	Player
15	DF	NOR	Max Bjørsvik (on loan from (Norway) Nest-Sotra)
—	MF	NOR	Mattias Totland (from (Norway) Fana)

Out: Note: Flags indicate national team as defined under FIFA eligibility rules; some limited exceptions apply. Players may hold more than one non-FIFA nationality.

No.	Pos.	Nation	Player
22	MF	CRC	Diego Calvo (on loan to (Sweden) IFK Göteborg)
23	MF	NOR	Kristofer Hæstad (retired)
34	GK	NOR	Gudmund Kongshavn (on loan to (Norway) Sarpsborg 08)
28	FW	NOR	Riki Alba (on loan to (Norway) Nest-Sotra)

== Competitions ==
=== Tippeligaen ===
==== Results summary ====
Overall								Home						Away					
Pld	W	D	L	GF	GA	GD	Pts	W	D	L	GF	GA	GD	W	D	L	GF	GA	GD
30	11	9	10	59	53	+6	42	8	5	2	33	19	+14	3	4	8	26	34	−8

==== Results by round ====
Round	1	2	3	4	5	6	7	8	9	10	11	12	13	14	15	16	17	18	19	20	21	22	23	24	25	26	27	28	29	30
Ground	A	H	A	H	A	H	A	H	A	H	A	H	A	A	H	A	H	A	H	A	H	A	H	H	A	H	A	H	A	H
Result	L	W	D	W	L	W	W	D	D	D	W	W	L	D	D	W	W	D	D	L	D	L	W	L	L	W	L	L	L	W
Position	14	8	10	4	7	5	4	5	4	6	4	3	5	5	5	5	4	4	5	5	6	6	6	6	6	6	6	6	6	6

Updated to match(es) played on 28 October 2014. Source: see below
A = Away; H = Home; W = Win; D = Draw; L = Loss

==== Results ====
28 March 2014 1	Molde	2–0	Vålerenga	Molde
19:00 CEST (UTC+1)	Forren 22'; Sigurðarson 29'	Summary		Stadium: Aker Stadion; Attendance: 8,875; Referee: Tom Harald Hagen

6 April 2014 2	Vålerenga	3–1	Bodø/Glimt	Oslo
18:00 CEST (UTC+2)	Kjartansson 7', 90+1' (pen.); R.Lindkvist 79'	Summary	Olsen 37'	Stadium: Ullevaal Stadion; Attendance: 9,299; Referee: Ken Henry Johnsen

12 April 2014 3	Haugesund	1–1	Vålerenga	Haugesund
18:00 CEST (UTC+2)	Fevang 44'	Summary	Kjartansson 90+2'	Stadium: Haugesund Stadion; Attendance: 4,769; Referee: Anders Johansen

21 April 2014 4	Vålerenga	3–0	Sandnes Ulf	Oslo
15:30 CEST (UTC+2)	Kjartansson 45+1'; R.Lindkvist 59'; Gunnarsson 61'	Summary		Stadium: Ullevaal Stadion; Attendance: 9,092; Referee: Kristoffer Helgerud

28 April 2014 5	Sarpsborg 08	3–0	Vålerenga	Sarpsborg
19:00 CEST (UTC+2)	Dja Djédjé 62'; Samuel 75'; Zajić 80'	Summary		Stadium: Sarpsborg Stadion; Attendance: 4,616; Referee: Espen Berntsen

1 May 2014 6	Vålerenga	3–0	Strømsgodset	Oslo
18:00 CEST (UTC+2)	Kjartansson 44', 73' (pen.); R.Lindkvist 79'	Summary		Stadium: Ullevaal Stadion; Attendance: 15,437; Referee: Tommy Skjerven

5 May 2014 7	Stabæk	0–3	Vålerenga	Bærum
CEST (UTC+2)	Fontanello (red card) 45+3'	Summary	Fontanello 16' (o.g.); Larsen 31'; Kjartansson 66'	Stadium: Nadderud Stadion; Attendance: 4,131; Referee: Svein Oddvar Moen

11 May 2014 8	Vålerenga	1–1	Viking	Oslo
18:00 CEST (UTC+2)	Kjartansson 1'	Summary	Sigurðsson 51'	Stadium: Ullevaal Stadion; Attendance: 8,280; Referee: Anders Johansen

16 May 2014 9	Start	2–2	Vålerenga	Kristiansand
18:00 CEST (UTC+2)	Hoff 61'; Tripić 79'	Summary	Kjartansson 15', 90' (pen.)	Stadium: Sør Arena; Attendance: 8,555; Referee: Ken Henry Johnsen

19 May 2014 10	Vålerenga	2–2	Lillestrøm	Oslo
18:00 CEST (UTC+2)	Lindkvist 21'; Gunnarsson (yellow card) 66'	Summary	Kippe (yellow card) 12', (goal) 18', , 51' (o.g.); Knudtzon (yellow card) 67'; Omoijuanfo (yellow card) 70'; Fofana 85', (yellow card) 86'	Stadium: Ullevaal Stadion; Attendance: 11,783; Referee: Svein Oddvar Moen

25 May 2014 11	Brann	2–3	Vålerenga	Bergen
19:00 CEST (UTC+2)	Grønner 32'; Lorentzen 78'	Summary	Høgh 35'; Kjartansson 47'; Stengel 73'	Stadium: Brann Stadion; Attendance: 9,180; Referee: Per Ivar Staberg

9 June 2014 12	Vålerenga	3–0	Aalesunds	Oslo
15:30 CEST (UTC+2)	Nilsen (yellow card) 15'; Kjartansson 18', 32'; Holm 40'	Summary	Carlsen (yellow card) 59'	Stadium: Ullevaal Stadion; Attendance: 8,554; Referee: Svein Erik Edvartsen

12 June 2014 13	Sogndal	2–0	Vålerenga	Sogndalsfjøra
18:00 CEST (UTC+2)	Flo 59'; Holsæter 79'	Summary		Stadium: Fosshaugane Campus; Attendance: 3,013; Referee: Kristoffer Helgerud

7 July 2014 14	Odd	2–2	Vålerenga	Skien
19:00 CEST (UTC+2)	Hagen 14'; Gunnarsson 41' (o.g.)	Summary	Mathisen 27'; Larsen 79'	Stadium: Skagerak Arena; Attendance: 7,279; Referee: Svein Erik Edvartsen

12 July 2014 15	Vålerenga	2–2	Rosenborg	Oslo
17:00 CEST (UTC+2)	Berre 57'; Grindheim 75'	Summary	Søderlund 5'; Reginiussen 41'	Stadium: Ullevaal Stadion; Attendance: 10 332; Referee: Tom Harald Hagen

19 July 2014 16	Strømsgodset	0–2	Vålerenga	Drammen
18:00 CEST (UTC+2)		Summary	Zahid 14'; Kjartansson 58'	Stadium: Marienlyst Stadion; Attendance: 7,108; Referee: Svein Oddvar Moen

29 July 2014 17	Vålerenga	3–2	Stabæk	Oslo
19:00 CEST (UTC+2)	Zahid 23', 82'; Kjartansson 36'	Summary	Brustad 22', 67'	Stadium: Ullevaal Stadion; Attendance: 14,656; Referee: Svein Erik Edvartsen

2 August 2014 18	Viking	5–5	Vålerenga	Stavanger
18:00 CEST (UTC+2)	Sigurðsson 44'; Thioune 57'; Nisja 75', 84'; Sverrisson 90'	Summary	Larsen 9'; Kjartansson 39', 61', 68'; Zahid 66'	Stadium: Viking Stadion; Attendance: 8,460; Referee: Tommy Skjerven

9 August 2014 19	Vålerenga	2–2	Sarpsborg 08	Oslo
15:30 CEST (UTC+2)	Kjartansson 50' (pen.) (red card) 90'; Zahid 70'	Summary	T.Breive 54'; Tokstad 82'	Stadium: Ullevaal Stadion; Attendance: 8,992; Referee: Tom Harald Hagen

17 August 2013 20	Lillestrøm	2–1	Vålerenga	Lillestrøm
18:00 CEST (UTC+2)	Moen 19'; Knudtzon 73'	Summary	Berre 46'	Stadium: Åråsen Stadion; Attendance: 8,667; Referee: Svein Erik Edvartsen

23 August 2014 21	Vålerenga	3–3	Brann	Oslo
18:00 CEST (UTC+2)	Zahid 10'; Kjartansson 26', 67'	Summary	Haugen 29'; Hanstveit 79'; Sævarsson 87'	Stadium: Ullevaal Stadion; Attendance: 9,859; Referee: Svein Oddvar Moen

30 August 2014 22	Bodø/Glimt	4–3	Vålerenga	Bodø
20:00 CEST (UTC+2)	N'Diaye 11'; Olsen 28'; Laajab 49' (pen.), 65'	Summary	Larsen 7'; Grindheim 17', 60'	Stadium: Aspmyra Stadion; Referee: Dag Vidar Hafsås

14 September 2014 23	Vålerenga	4–1	Haugesund	Oslo
18:00 CEST (UTC+2)	Kjartansson 32', 34', 72'; Zahid 60'	Summary	Cvetinović 48'	Stadium: Ullevaal Stadion; Attendance: 8,729; Referee: Espen Berntsen

20 September 2014 24	Vålerenga	0–2	Molde	Oslo
18:00 CEST (UTC+2)		Summary	Chima 22'; Forren (yellow card) 43'; Gulbrandsen 69'	Stadium: Ullevaal Stadion; Attendance: 9,173; Referee: Tore Hansen

26 September 2014 25	Sandnes Ulf	2–1	Vålerenga	Sandnes
19:00 CEST (UTC+2)	Rubio 55' (pen.), 60'	Summary	Grindheim 61'	Stadium: Sandnes Idrettspark; Attendance: 2,388; Referee: Dag Vidar Hafsås

5 October 2014 26	Vålerenga	2–1	Sogndal	Oslo
18:00 CEST (UTC+2)	Zahid 41'; Patronen 50' (o.g.)	Summary	Nilsen 8'	Stadium: Ullevaal Stadion; Attendance: 7,211; Referee: Svein Erik Edvartsen

19 October 2014 27	Rosenborg	3–2	Vålerenga	Trondheim
20:00 CEST (UTC+2)	Helland 26'; Malec 75'; Dorsin 45+1'	Summary	Kjartansson 10'; Gunnarsson 19'	Stadium: Lerkendal Stadion; Attendance: 14,106; Referee: Svein Oddvar Moen

24 October 2014 28	Vålerenga	1–2	Odd	Oslo
19:00 CEST (UTC+2)	Zahid 79'	Summary	Shala 14'; Storbæk 32'	Stadium: Ullevaal Stadion; Attendance: 7,355; Referee: Tore Hansen

2 November 2014 29	Aalesund	4–1	Vålerenga	Ålesund
18:00 CET (UTC+1)	James 26'; Barrantes 34', 52'; O.Lie (yellow card) 63'; Phillips (yellow card) 71'; Abdellaoue 81'	Report	Larsen 11'; Iqbal (yellow card) 36'; Holm (yellow card) 51'; Berre (yellow card) 79'	Stadium: Color Line Stadion; Attendance: 8,766; Referee: Tommy Skjerven

9 November 2014 30	Vålerenga	1–0	Start	Oslo
18:00 CET (UTC+1)	Stengel 40'	Summary		Stadium: Ullevaal Stadion; Attendance: 7,583; Referee: Svein Oddvar Moen

==== Table ====
Pos	Team	Pld	W	D	L	GF	GA	GD	Pts	Qualification or relegation
4	Strømsgodset	30	15	5	10	48	42	+6	50	Qualification for the Europa League first qualifying round (Note: Since the winners of the 2014 Norwegian Cup (Molde) qualified for European competition based on their league position, the berth (Europa League first qualifying round) was passed down the league to Strømsgodset.)
5	Lillestrøm	30	13	7	10	49	35	+14	46	
6	Vålerenga	30	11	9	10	59	53	+6	42	
7	Aalesund	30	11	8	11	40	39	+1	41	
8	Sarpsborg 08	30	10	10	10	41	48	−7	40	

Source: fotball.no
Rules for classification: 1) points; 2) goal difference; 3) number of goals scored.

=== Norwegian Cup ===
24 April 2014 First Round	Nordstrand	0–5	Vålerenga	Oslo
18:00 CEST (UTC+2)		Summary	Alba 58'; Holm 61'; Kjartansson 68', 76', 87'	Stadium: Nordstrand artificial Attendance: 2,001; Referee: Anders Hauglund

8 May 2014 Second Round	Elverum	2–3	Vålerenga	Elverum
18:00 CEST (UTC+2)	P.Nersveen 81'; L.Kleiven 82'	Summary	Holm 52'; S.Nilsen 79'; Kjartansson 90+2'	Stadium: Sentralidrettsplassen; Attendance: 810; Referee: Christian Moen

4 June 2014 Third Round	Vålerenga	5–2	Lyn	Oslo
19:00 CEST (UTC+2)	Berre 16'; S.Nilsen 21', 87'; Kjartansson 75', 81'	Summary	F.Badou Jor 76'; M.Cham 90+3'	Stadium: Ullevaal Stadion; Attendance: 7,387; Referee: Omar Rafiq

27 June 2014 Fourth Round	Odd	3–2	Vålerenga	Skien
19:00 CEST (UTC+2)	Johnsen 51', 58'; Akabueze 90' (pen.)	Summary	Høgh 68'; Holm 78'	Stadium: Skagerak Arena; Attendance: 5,744; Referee: Per Ivar Staberg

== Squad statistics ==
As of match played 9 November 2014

=== Appearances and goals ===
No.	Pos	Nat	Player	Total		Tippeligaen		Norwegian Cup	
No.	Pos	Nat	Player	Apps	Goals	Apps	Goals	Apps	Goals
2	DF	(Norway) NOR	Niklas Gunnarsson	31	3	29	3	2	0
3	DF	(Norway) NOR	Ruben Kristiansen	28	0	26	0	2	0
4	DF	(Norway) NOR	André Muri	4	0	4	0	0	0
5	DF	(Sweden) SWE	Rasmus Lindkvist	24	4	19+3	4	2	0
6	DF	(Norway) NOR	Simon Larsen	33	5	30	5	3	0
7	FW	(Norway) NOR	Daniel Fredheim Holm	24	4	14+6	1	4	3
8	MF	(Norway) NOR	Sivert Nilsen	31	3	28	0	2+1	3
10	FW	(Iceland) ISL	Viðar Örn Kjartansson	33	31	29	25	2+2	6
11	MF	(Norway) NOR	Morten Berre	32	1	11+18	0	2+1	1
14	MF	(Norway) NOR	Herman Stengel	26	2	8+16	2	1+1	0
15	DF	(Norway) NOR	Max Jakob Bjørsvik	6	0	2+4	0	0	0
17	MF	(Norway) NOR	Ghayas Zahid	33	9	26+3	9	0+4	0
19	MF	(Norway) NOR	Christian Grindheim	31	4	28+1	4	2	0
20	DF	(Norway) NOR	Anders Plassen	1	0	0	0	1	0
21	MF	(Norway) NOR	Alexander Mathisen	25	1	17+7	1	1	0
24	DF	(Denmark) DEN	Nicolai Høgh	17	2	14	1	3	1
25	MF	(Norway) NOR	Markus Brændsrød	7	0	0+6	0	1	0
26	DF	(Norway) NOR	Simen Olafsen	2	0	0+1	0	1	0
29	DF	(Norway) NOR	Svein Marius Koss	1	0	0	0	1	0
30	GK	(Austria) AUT	Michael Langer	31	0	28	0	3	0
35	DF	(Norway) NOR	Kamran Ali Iqbal	12	0	4+6	0	2	0
36	MF	(Norway) NOR	Mathias Blårud	14	0	1+11	0	2	0
37	DF	(Norway) NOR	Ivan Näsberg	5	0	3+1	0	1	0
38	MF	(Norway) NOR	Fitim Kastrati	2	0	0+1	0	1	0
39	MF	(Norway) NOR	Moussa Nije	2	0	0+2	0	0	0
Players away from Vålerenga on loan:
22	MF	(Costa Rica) CRC	Diego Calvo	12	0	7+3	0	2	0
28	FW	(Norway) NOR	Riki Alba	1	1	0	0	1	1
34	GK	(Norway) NOR	Gudmund Kongshavn	3	0	2	0	1	0
Players who appeared for Vålerenga no longer at the club:
23	MF	(Norway) NOR	Kristofer Hæstad	2	0	0	0	1+1	0

=== Goal Scorers ===
Place	Position	Nation	Number	Name	Tippeligaen	Norwegian Cup	Total
1	FW	(Iceland)	10	Viðar Örn Kjartansson	25	6	31
2	MF	(Norway)	17	Ghayas Zahid	9	0	9
3	DF	(Norway)	6	Simon Larsen	5	0	5
4	DF	(Sweden)	5	Rasmus Lindkvist	4	0	4
4	MF	(Norway)	19	Christian Grindheim	4	0	4
4	FW	(Norway)	7	Daniel Fredheim Holm	1	3	4
7	DF	(Norway)	2	Niklas Gunnarsson	3	0	3
7	FW	(Norway)	11	Morten Berre	2	1	3
7	MF	(Norway)	8	Sivert Nilsen	0	3	3
10	MF	(Norway)	14	Herman Stengel	2	0	2
10	DF	(Denmark)	24	Nicolai Høgh	1	1	2
10				Own goal	2	0	2
13	MF	(Norway)	21	Alexander Mathisen	1	0	1
13	FW	(Norway)	28	Riki Alba	0	1	1
				TOTALS	58	15	73

=== Disciplinary record ===
Number	Nation	Position	Name	Tippeligaen		Norwegian Cup		Total	
Number	Nation	Position	Name	Yellow card	Red card	Yellow card	Red card	Yellow card	Red card
2	(Norway)	DF	Niklas Gunnarsson	4	0	0	0	4	0
3	(Norway)	DF	Ruben Kristiansen	2	0	0	0	2	0
6	(Norway)	DF	Simon Larsen	2	0	1	0	3	0
7	(Norway)	FW	Daniel Fredheim Holm	3	0	0	0	3	0
8	(Norway)	MF	Sivert Nilsen	5	0	0	0	5	0
10	(Iceland)	FW	Viðar Örn Kjartansson	1	1	0	0	1	1
11	(Norway)	MF	Morten Berre	2	0	0	0	2	0
14	(Norway)	MF	Herman Stengel	1	0	0	0	1	0
17	(Norway)	MF	Ghayas Zahid	1	0	2	0	3	0
19	(Norway)	MF	Christian Grindheim	3	0	0	0	3	0
21	(Norway)	MF	Alexander Mathisen	1	0	0	0	1	0
24	(Denmark)	DF	Nicolai Høgh	0	0	1	0	1	0
35	(Norway)	DF	Kamran Ali Iqbal	2	0	1	0	3	0
			TOTALS	27	1	5	0	32	1
