= 2013 Vålerenga Fotball season =

Vålerenga
2013 season
- Chairman: Odd Skarheim
- Manager: Kjetil Rekdal
- Stadium: Ullevaal Stadion
- Tippeligaen: 11th
- Norwegian Cup: Quarter-finals vs Rosenborg
- Top goalscorer: League: Morten Berre (10); All: Torgeir Børven (16)
- Highest home attendance: 13,609 vs Rosenborg; 26 May 2013
- Lowest home attendance: 7,940 vs Haugesund; 26 October 2013
- Average home league attendance: 9,406
Home colours	Away colours	Third colours

The 2013 season was Vålerenga's 12th season back in the Tippeligaen since their promotion in 2000. It is their first season with Kjetil Rekdal as manager and they finished the season in 11th place in the Tippeligaen and they reached the Quarter-finals of the cup losing to Rosenborg.

== Squad ==
Note: Flags indicate national team as defined under FIFA eligibility rules; some limited exceptions apply. Players may hold more than one non-FIFA nationality.

No.	Pos.	Nation	Player
1	GK	CAN	Lars Hirschfeld
2	DF	SWE	Joseph Baffo (on loan from Helsingborg)
4	DF	NOR	André Muri
5	DF	CZE	Jan Lecjaks (on loan from Young Boys)
6	DF	NOR	Simon Larsen
7	MF	NOR	Daniel Fredheim Holm
8	MF	NOR	Jan Gunnar Solli
9	FW	BEN	Sidoine Oussou
10	FW	NOR	Torgeir Børven
11	FW	NOR	Morten Berre
13	MF	NGR	Fegor Ogude
15	DF	NOR	Joachim Thomassen

No.	Pos.	Nation	Player
18	DF	CRC	Giancarlo González
19	MF	NOR	Christian Grindheim
22	FW	CRC	Diego Calvo
23	MF	NOR	Kristofer Hæstad (Captain)
24	DF	DEN	Nicolai Høgh
26	MF	SRB	Bojan Zajić
27	FW	NOR	Chuma Anene
33	DF	NOR	Marcel Wawrzynkiewicz
34	GK	NOR	Gudmund Taksdal Kongshavn
40	MF	NOR	Ghayas Zahid
50	GK	NOR	Øyvind Knutsen

== Transfers ==
=== Winter ===
In: Note: Flags indicate national team as defined under FIFA eligibility rules; some limited exceptions apply. Players may hold more than one non-FIFA nationality.

No.	Pos.	Nation	Player
5	DF	CZE	Jan Lecjaks (loan from (Switzerland) Young Boys)
7	MF	NOR	Daniel Fredheim Holm (from (Norway) Rosenborg)
8	MF	NOR	Jan Gunnar Solli (from (United States) New York Red Bulls)
19	MF	NOR	Christian Grindheim (loan from (Denmark) Copenhagen)
20	FW	NOR	Mustafa Abdellaoue (loan from (Denmark) Copenhagen)
22	FW	CRC	Diego Calvo (from (Costa Rica) Alajuelense)

Out: Note: Flags indicate national team as defined under FIFA eligibility rules; some limited exceptions apply. Players may hold more than one non-FIFA nationality.

No.	Pos.	Nation	Player
3	DF	NOR	Andreas Nordvik (to (Norway) Aalesund)
5	DF	NOR	Aleksander Solli (to (Norway) Hønefoss)
14	FW	BFA	Yssouf Koné (Released)
16	MF	SEN	Pape Maly Diamanka (loan return to (Spain) Rayo Vallecano)
19	FW	USA	Chad Barrett (loan return to (United States) Los Angeles Galaxy)
25	FW	CAN	Tosaint Ricketts (to (Norway) Sandnes Ulf)

=== Summer ===
In: Note: Flags indicate national team as defined under FIFA eligibility rules; some limited exceptions apply. Players may hold more than one non-FIFA nationality.

No.	Pos.	Nation	Player
2	DF	SWE	Joseph Baffo (on loan from (Sweden) Helsingborg)
19	MF	NOR	Christian Grindheim (from (Denmark) Copenhagen, previously on loan)
23	DF	DEN	Nicolai Høgh (from (Denmark) Esbjerg)

Out: Note: Flags indicate national team as defined under FIFA eligibility rules; some limited exceptions apply. Players may hold more than one non-FIFA nationality.

No.	Pos.	Nation	Player
2	DF	NOR	Benjamin Dahl Hagen (to (Norway) Follo)
17	MF	NOR	Mohammed Fellah (to (Denmark) Esbjerg)
20	FW	NOR	Mustafa Abdellaoue (loan return to (Denmark) Copenhagen)
21	FW	NGR	Ahmed Suleiman
28	FW	NGR	Aaron Samuel Olanare (to (Norway) Sarpsborg 08)
30	MF	NOR	Kamer Qaka (to (Norway) Raufoss)

== Competitions ==
=== Friendlies ===
27 July 2013	Vålerenga (Norway)	0–7	(Spain) Barcelona	Oslo
19:00 CET		Report	Sánchez 4'; Tello 6'; Messi 13' dos Santos 41'; Dongou 51', 54'; Román 85'	Stadium: Ullevaal Stadion

=== Tippeligaen ===
==== Results summary ====
Overall								Home						Away					
Pld	W	D	L	GF	GA	GD	Pts	W	D	L	GF	GA	GD	W	D	L	GF	GA	GD
30	10	6	14	41	50	−9	36	6	3	6	27	27	0	4	3	8	14	23	−9

==== Results by round ====
Round	1	2	3	4	5	6	7	8	9	10	11	12	13	14	15	16	17	18	19	20	21	22	23	24	25	26	27	28	29	30
Ground	A	H	A	H	A	H	A	H	A	H	A	H	H	A	H	A	H	A	H	A	H	A	H	A	H	A	A	H	A	H
Result	L	W	L	L	L	W	W	L	L	W	D	L	D	W	D	W	W	D	L	D	D	L	W	L	L	L	W	L	L	W
Position	14	10	12	15	15	12	11	12	13	12	11	12	12	9	10	8	7	7	8	8	8	9	9	9	11	11	10	10	11	11

Updated to match(es) played on 11 November 2013. Source: see below
A = Away; H = Home; W = Win; D = Draw; L = Loss

==== Results ====
17 March 2013 1	Brann	3–1	Vålerenga	Bergen
18:00 CET (UTC+1)	Haugen 13'; Larsen 47'; Nordkvelle 74'	Summary	Børven 77'	Stadium: Brann Stadion; Attendance: 12,102; Referee: Svein Moen

1 April 2013 2	Vålerenga	1–0	Sogndal	Oslo
19:00 CEST (UTC+2)	Børven 2'	Summary		Stadium: Ullevaal Stadion; Attendance: 10,442; Referee: Kristoffer Helgerud

5 April 2013 3	Odd	2–0	Vålerenga	Skien
19:00 CEST (UTC+2)	Johnsen 13'; Güven 20'	Summary		Stadium: Skagerak Arena; Attendance: 5,044; Referee: Tommy Skjerven

13 April 2013 4	Vålerenga	0–3	Strømsgodset	Oslo
18:00 CEST (UTC+2)	Ogude (yellow card) 11'; Solli (yellow card) 79'	Summary	Storflor 3'; Storbæk 9'; Keita 16'	Stadium: Ullevaal Stadion; Attendance: 9,740; Referee: Svein Moen

19 April 2013 5	Start	1–0	Vålerenga	Kristiansand
19:00 CEST (UTC+2)	Asante 74'	Summary		Stadium: Sør Arena; Attendance: 6,737; Referee: Espen Berntsen

27 April 2013 6	Vålerenga	2–1	Aalesund	Oslo
18:00 CEST (UTC+2)	Fellah 42'; Abdellaoue 59'	Summary	Ulvestad 83' (pen.)	Stadium: Ullevaal Stadion; Attendance: 10,037; Referee: Dag Hafsås

4 May 2013 7	Sandnes Ulf	1–2	Vålerenga	Sandnes
15:30 CEST (UTC+2)	Høiland 53'	Summary	Calvo 8'; Larsen 12'	Stadium: Sandnes Idrettspark; Attendance: 2,690; Referee: Tommy Skjerven

8 May 2013 8	Vålerenga	1–2	Hønefoss	Oslo
19:00 CEST (UTC+2)	González 63'	Summary	Vendelbo 44'; Solli 88'	Stadium: Ullevaal Stadion; Attendance: 8,136; Referee: Tore Hansen

12 May 2013 9	Haugesund	1–0	Vålerenga	Haugesund
15:30 CEST (UTC+2)	Søderlund 82'	Summary		Stadium: Haugesund Stadion; Attendance: 4,452; Referee: Kristoffer Helgerud

16 May 2013 10	Vålerenga	2–0	Tromsø	Oslo
18:00 CEST (UTC+2)	Berre 10'; Muri 74'	Summary		Stadium: Ullevaal Stadion; Attendance: 9,338; Referee: Svein Erik Edvartsen

21 May 2013 11	Sarpsborg 08	3–3	Vålerenga	Sarpsborg
18:30 CEST (UTC+2)	Valdimarsson 38'; Þórarinsson 60'; Berthod 90+2'	Summary	Berre 6', 45+1'; Holm 68'	Stadium: Sarpsborg Stadion; Attendance: 3,669; Referee: Ken Henry Johnsen

26 May 2013 12	Vålerenga	1–2	Rosenborg	Oslo
18:00 CEST (UTC+2)	Lecjaks 87'	Summary	Reginiussen 65'; Svensson 84'	Stadium: Ullevaal Stadion; Attendance: 13,609; Referee: Tommy Skjerven

22 June 2013 13	Vålerenga	3–3	Molde	Oslo
CEST (UTC+2)	Berre 10', 59'; Solli 56'	Summary	Berget 28'; Linnes 40'; Agnaldo 90+1'	Stadium: Ullevaal Stadion; Attendance: 10,694; Referee: Tom Harald Hagen

30 June 2013 14	Lillestrøm	0–1	Vålerenga	Lillestrøm
15:30 CEST (UTC+2)		Summary	González 56'	Stadium: Åråsen Stadion; Attendance: 9,766; Referee: Svein Moen

7 July 2013 15	Vålerenga	2–2	Viking	Oslo
19:00 CEST (UTC+2)	Børven 48'; Kongshavn 90+5'	Summary	Berisha 28'; Ingelsten 55'	Stadium: Ullevaal Stadion; Attendance: 8,621; Referee: Ken Henry Johnsen

12 July 2013 16	Hønefoss	1–2	Vålerenga	Hønefoss
19:00 CEST (UTC+2)	Ulvestad (red card) 4'; Riski 45' (pen.); Groven (yellow card) 75'	Summary	Solli 41'; Berre 61'; Grindheim (yellow card) 88'	Stadium: Aka Arena; Attendance: 3,241; Referee: Dag Hafsås

29 July 2013 17	Vålerenga	5–3	Sarpsborg 08	Oslo
19:00 CEST (UTC+2)	Børven 4', 49'; Zajić 27'; Høgh 71'; Berre 82'	Summary	Breive 40'; González 61' (o.g.); Wiig 78'	Stadium: Ullevaal Stadion; Attendance: 12,525; Referee: Espen Berntsen

4 August 2013 18	Tromsø	2–2	Vålerenga	Tromsø
19:00 CEST (UTC+2)	Johansen 57'; Moldskred 79'	Summary	Fellah 15'; Hæstad 33'	Stadium: Alfheim Stadion; Attendance: 4,040; Referee: Kristoffer Helgerud

11 August 2013 19	Vålerenga	1–3	Start	Oslo
19:00 CEST (UTC+2)	Lecjaks 90+1'	Summary	Castro 26'; Acosta 40'; Tronstad 81'	Stadium: Ullevaal Stadion; Attendance: 8,553; Referee: Svein Erik Edvartsen

18 August 2013 20	Rosenborg	0–0	Vålerenga	Trondheim
CEST (UTC+2)		Summary		Stadium: Lerkendal Stadion; Attendance: 13,845; Referee: Ken Henry Johnsen

25 August 2013 21	Vålerenga	1–1	Lillestrøm	Oslo
18:00 CEST (UTC+2)	Børven 42'	Summary	Østli 12'	Stadium: Ullevaal Stadion; Attendance: 12,200; Referee: Dag Vidar Hafsås

1 September 2013 22	Molde	4–0	Vålerenga	Molde
19:00 CEST (UTC+2)	Gulbrandsen 12', 25'; Berget 14'; Linnes 85'	Summary		Stadium: Aker Stadion; Attendance: 8,381; Referee: Ken Henry Johnsen

15 September 2013 23	Vålerenga	4–3	Brann	Oslo
18:00 CEST (UTC+2)	Berre 4', 61'; Børven 74', 84'	Summary	Pusic 9'; Huseklepp 10'; Barmen 17'	Stadium: Ullevaal Stadion; Attendance: 10,642; Referee: Espen Berntsen

22 September 2013 24	Viking	1–0	Vålerenga	Stavanger
19:00 CEST (UTC+2)	Danielsen 2'	Summary		Stadium: Viking Stadion; Attendance: 10,643; Referee: Dag Vidar Hafsås

29 September 2013 25	Vålerenga	1–2	Odd	Oslo
18:00 CEST (UTC+2)	Zajić 90'	Summary	Rashani 66'; Krogsgård 90+2'	Stadium: Ullevaal Stadion; Attendance: 7,798; Referee: Kristoffer Helgerud

5 October 2013 26	Strømsgodset	2–1	Vålerenga	Drammen
18:00 CEST (UTC+2)	Johansen 61'; Storflor 88'	Summary	Zajić 85'	Stadium: Marienlyst Stadion; Attendance: 6,845; Referee: Tom Harald Hagen

20 October 2013 25	Sogndal	1–2	Vålerenga	Sogndalsfjøra
18:00 CEST (UTC+2)	Sagna 52'	Summary	Zajić 59'; Grindheim 89'	Stadium: Fosshaugane Campus; Attendance: 4,084; Referee: Tom Harald Hagen

26 October 2013 28	Vålerenga	1–2	Haugesund	Oslo
15 :30 CEST (UTC+2)	Børven 51'	Summary	Cvetinović 61'; Muri 64'	Stadium: Ullevaal Stadion; Attendance: 7,940; Referee: Tommy Skjerven

3 November 2013 29	Aalesund	1–0	Vålerenga	Ålesund
18:00 CET (UTC+1)	Hamdallah 27'; Larsen (yellow card) 87'	Summary	Moussa Nije (yellow card) 60'; Holm (yellow card) 75'; Ogude (red card) 80'	Stadium: Color Line Stadion; Attendance: 8,648; Referee: Svein Edvartsen

10 November 2013 30	Vålerenga	2–0	Sandnes Ulf	Oslo
18:00 CET (UTC+1)	Berre 6'; Høgh (red card) 39'; González 70'	Summary		Stadium: Ullevaal Stadion; Attendance: 8,183; Referee: Kim Andre Johnsen

==== Table ====
Pos	Team	Pld	W	D	L	GF	GA	GD	Pts
9	Start	30	10	8	12	43	46	−3	38
10	Lillestrøm	30	9	9	12	37	44	−7	36
11	Vålerenga	30	10	6	14	41	50	−9	36
12	Sogndal	30	8	9	13	33	48	−15	33
13	Sandnes Ulf	30	9	6	15	36	58	−22	33

Source: fotball.no
Rules for classification: 1) points; 2) goal difference; 3) number of goals scored.

=== Norwegian Cup ===
16 April 2013 First Round	Frigg Oslo	1–6	Vålerenga	Oslo
18:30 CEST (UTC+2)	K.Eide 10'	Summary	Zajić 21'; Abdellaoue 24', 46'; Berre 30'; Larsen 63'; Fellah 80'	Stadium: Frogner stadion Attendance: 1,051; Referee: Bjørn Hansen

1 May 2013 Second Round	Ullern	1–8	Vålerenga	Oslo
18:00 CEST (UTC+2)	Berg 3'	Report	Samuel 7'; Børven 17', 26', 30', 70'; Calvo 41'; Zahid 45'; Benmoussa 63'	Stadium: Ullern Idrettsplass; Attendance: 2,702; Referee: Ola Hobber Nilsen

29 May 2013 Third Round	Asker	2–3	Vålerenga	Asker
18:00 CEST (UTC+2)	Sistek 53'; Ajeti 81'	Summary	Calvo 24', 55'; Børven 34'; González (yellow card) 73' (yellow-red card) 79'	Stadium: Føyka Stadion; Attendance: 2,356; Referee: Martin Sleire Lundby

26 June 2013 Fourth Round	Vålerenga	3–1	Sogndal	Oslo
18:00 CEST (UTC+2)	Børven 17'; Holm 72'; Abdellaoue 90+4'	Summary	Holsæter 78'	Stadium: Ullevaal Stadion; Attendance: 2,040; Referee: Espen Berntsen

21 August 2013 Quarter-finals	Rosenborg	2–1	Vålerenga	Trondheim
18:30 CEST (UTC+2)	Søderlund 78'; Nielsen 90+2'	Summary	Børven 87'	Stadium: Lerkendal Stadion; Attendance: 7,680; Referee: Tore Hansen

== Squad statistics ==
As of 11 November 2013

=== Appearances and goals ===
No.	Pos	Nat	Player	Total		Tippeligaen		Norwegian Cup	
No.	Pos	Nat	Player	Apps	Goals	Apps	Goals	Apps	Goals
1	GK	(Canada) CAN	Lars Hirschfeld	6	0	4+0	0	2+0	0
2	DF	(Sweden) SWE	Joseph Baffo	8	0	7+1	0	0+0	0
4	DF	(Norway) NOR	André Muri	28	1	23+2	1	3+0	0
5	DF	(Czech Republic) CZE	Jan Lecjaks	24	2	20+0	2	4+0	0
6	DF	(Norway) NOR	Simon Larsen	14	2	8+3	1	3+0	1
7	MF	(Norway) NOR	Daniel Fredheim Holm	25	2	22+0	1	3+0	1
8	MF	(Norway) NOR	Jan Gunnar Solli	21	2	12+7	2	2+0	0
10	FW	(Norway) NOR	Torgeir Børven	30	16	22+4	9	4+0	7
11	FW	(Norway) NOR	Morten Berre	28	11	15+8	10	5+0	1
13	MF	(Nigeria) NGR	Fegor Ogude	11	0	8+3	0	0+0	0
15	DF	(Norway) NOR	Joachim Thomassen	11	0	6+4	0	1+0	0
18	DF	(Costa Rica) CRC	Giancarlo González	27	3	19+4	3	3+1	0
19	MF	(Norway) NOR	Christian Grindheim	25	1	22+0	1	3+0	0
22	FW	(Costa Rica) CRC	Diego Calvo	26	4	19+3	1	4+0	3
23	MF	(Norway) NOR	Kristofer Hæstad	25	1	17+4	1	1+3	0
24	DF	(Denmark) DEN	Nicolai Høgh	7	1	6+0	1	1+0	0
25	MF	(Norway) NOR	Moussa Njie	1	0	0+1	0	0+0	0
26	MF	(Serbia) SRB	Bojan Zajić	19	5	6+10	4	1+2	1
27	FW	(Norway) NOR	Chuma Anene	5	0	2+2	0	0+1	0
33	DF	(Norway) NOR	Marcel Wawrzynkiewicz	21	0	14+2	0	4+1	0
34	GK	(Norway) NOR	Gudmund Taksdal Kongshavn	26	1	23+0	1	3+0	0
35	MF	(Norway) NOR	Monir Benmoussa	2	1	0+0	0	0+2	1
36	MF	(Norway) NOR	Mathias Blårud	3	0	0+2	0	1+0	0
37	DF	(Norway) NOR	Ivan Näsberg	4	0	3+1	0	0+0	0
39	MF	(Norway) NOR	Akinsola Akinyemi	1	0	0+0	0	1+0	0
40	MF	(Norway) NOR	Ghayas Zahid	5	1	1+2	0	1+1	1
42	DF	(Norway) NOR	Kamran Ali Iqbal	1	0	0+0	0	0+1	0
43	MF	(Norway) NOR	Fitim Kastrati	6	0	1+4	0	0+1	0
Players away from Vålerenga on loan:
Players who left Vålerenga during the season:
17	MF	(Norway) NOR	Mohammed Fellah	12	3	9+1	2	2+0	1
20	FW	(Norway) NOR	Mustafa Abdellaoue	13	4	7+3	1	1+2	3
28	FW	(Nigeria) NGR	Aaron Samuel Olanare	12	1	4+6	0	2+0	1

=== Goal scorers ===
Place	Position	Nation	Number	Name	Tippeligaen	Norwegian Cup	Total
1	FW	(Norway)	10	Torgeir Børven	9	7	16
2	FW	(Norway)	11	Morten Berre	10	1	11
3	MF	(Serbia)	26	Bojan Zajić	4	1	5
4	FW	(Costa Rica)	22	Diego Calvo	1	3	4
4	FW	(Norway)	20	Mustafa Abdellaoue	1	3	4
6	DF	(Costa Rica)	18	Giancarlo González	3	0	3
6	MF	(Norway)	17	Mohammed Fellah	2	1	3
8	DF	(Czech Republic)	5	Jan Lecjaks	2	0	2
8	MF	(Norway)	8	Jan Gunnar Solli	2	0	2
8	DF	(Norway)	6	Simon Larsen	1	1	2
8	MF	(Norway)	7	Daniel Fredheim Holm	1	1	2
12	DF	(Norway)	4	André Muri	1	0	1
12	GK	(Norway)	34	Gudmund Taksdal Kongshavn	1	0	1
12	DF	(Denmark)	24	Nicolai Høgh	1	0	1
12	MF	(Norway)	23	Kristofer Hæstad	1	0	1
12	MF	(Norway)	19	Christian Grindheim	1	0	1
12	FW	(Norway)	11	Morten Berre	0	1	1
12	FW	(Nigeria)	28	Aaron Samuel Olanare	0	1	1
12	MF	(Norway)	40	Ghayas Zahid	0	1	1
12	MF	(Norway)	35	Monir Benmoussa	0	1	1
				TOTALS	41	21	62

=== Disciplinary record ===
Number	Nation	Position	Name	Tippeligaen		Norwegian Cup		Total	
Number	Nation	Position	Name	Yellow card	Red card	Yellow card	Red card	Yellow card	Red card
2	(Sweden)	DF	Joseph Baffo	2	0	0	0	2	0
5	(Czech Republic)	DF	Jan Lecjaks	4	0	0	0	4	0
6	(Norway)	DF	Simon Larsen	1	0	0	0	1	0
7	(Norway)	MF	Daniel Fredheim Holm	3	0	0	0	3	0
8	(Norway)	MF	Jan Gunnar Solli	2	0	0	0	2	0
11	(Norway)	FW	Morten Berre	2	0	0	0	2	0
13	(Nigeria)	MF	Fegor Ogude	5	0	0	0	5	0
17	(Norway)	MF	Mohammed Fellah	2	0	0	0	2	0
18	(Costa Rica)	DF	Giancarlo González	2	0	2	1	4	1
19	(Norway)	MF	Christian Grindheim	1	0	0	0	1	0
22	(Costa Rica)	FW	Diego Calvo	2	0	2	0	4	0
23	(Norway)	MF	Kristofer Hæstad	1	0	0	0	1	0
24	(Denmark)	DF	Nicolai Høgh	1	1	1	0	2	1
26	(Serbia)	MF	Bojan Zajić	2	0	0	0	2	0
28	(Nigeria)	FW	Aaron Samuel Olanare	1	0	0	0	1	0
33	(Norway)	DF	Marcel Wawrzynkiewicz	2	0	0	0	2	0
34	(Norway)	GK	Gudmund Taksdal Kongshavn	1	0	0	0	1	0
			TOTALS	34	1	5	1	39	2
