= Akinsola Akinyemi =

Norwegian footballer (born 1993)

Personal information
- Full name: Akinsola Ihayere Azeez Akinyemi
- Date of birth: 12 July 1993 (age 33)
- Place of birth: Norway
- Height: 1.89 m (6 ft 2 1/2 in)
- Position: Center back

Team information
- Current team: Skeid
- Number: 23

Youth career
- –2010: Holmlia
- 2011–2012: Vålerenga

Senior career*
Years	Team	Apps	(Gls)
2012–2013	Vålerenga	3	(0)
2013–2014	Drøbak-Frogn	7	(0)
2014–2015	Grorud	41	(5)
2016–2017	Fredrikstad	45	(3)
2018–2019	Sandnes Ulf	49	(3)
2020	Lokomotiv Plovdiv	9	(0)
2020–2021	Maccabi Netanya	9	(0)
2021	Raufoss	13	(0)
2022	Grorud	17	(0)
2023–2024	KFUM Oslo	42	(2)
2025–	Skeid	38	(0)
- * Club domestic league appearances and goals as of 15 November 2026

Akinsola Ihayere Azeez Akinyemi (born 12 July 1993) is a Norwegian professional footballer who plays for Skeid as a defender.

== Career ==
Starting his career in Holmlia SK, Akinyemi went to Vålerenga as a youth player. He made his Norwegian Premier League debut in August 2012 against Odd, and made a total of three appearances that season.

Akinyemi was released in the summer of 2013. He played for Drøbak-Frogn IL later that season, before joining Grorud IL. Ahead of the 2016 season he stepped up to the second-tier when signing for Fredrikstad FK.

He played abroad in Bulgaria and Israel. On the summer deadline day of 2021 he signed for Raufoss IL.

On 12 March 2025, he signed a contract with Skeid.

Akinsola Akinyemi should not be confused with Akinbola Akinyemi, who has also played in the Oslo area, among others for Kjelsås and Follo.

== Personal life ==
Born in Norway, Akinyemi is of Nigerian descent.

== Career statistics ==
=== Club ===
As of 3 September 2024

Club	Season	League			National Cup (Note: Including Norwegian Football Cup, and Bulgarian Cup)		Other		Total	
Club	Season	Division	Apps	Goals	Apps	Goals	Apps	Goals	Apps	Goals
Vålerenga	2012	Eliteserien	3	0	0	0	—		3	0
Vålerenga	2013	Eliteserien	0	0	2	0	—		2	0
Vålerenga	Total		3	0	2	0	—		5	0
Drøbak-Frogn	2013	2. divisjon	7	0	0	0	—		7	0
Drøbak-Frogn	Total		7	0	0	0	—		7	0
Grorud	2014	2. divisjon	21	3	3	1	—		24	4
Grorud	2015	2. divisjon	20	2	1	0	—		21	2
Grorud	Total		41	5	4	1	—		45	6
Fredrikstad	2016	1. divisjon	22	0	3	0	—		25	0
Fredrikstad	2017	1. divisjon	23	3	0	0	2 (Note: Appearances in 1. divisjon relegation play-offs)	0	25	3
Fredrikstad	Total		45	3	3	0	2	0	50	3
Sandnes Ulf	2018	1. divisjon	27	1	3	0	—		30	1
Sandnes Ulf	2019	1. divisjon	22	2	2	0	—		24	2
Sandnes Ulf	Total		49	3	5	0	—		54	3
Lokomotiv Plovdiv	2019-20	Bulgarian First League	9	0	2	0	—		11	0
Lokomotiv Plovdiv	Total		9	0	2	0	—		11	0
Maccabi Netanya	2020-21	Israeli Premier League	9	0	0	0	—		9	0
Maccabi Netanya	Total		9	0	0	0	—		9	0
Raufoss	2021	1. divisjon	13	0	1	0	—		14	0
Raufoss	Total		13	0	1	0	—		14	0
Grorud	2022	1. divisjon	17	0	1	0	—		18	0
Grorud	Total		17	0	1	0	—		18	0
KFUM Oslo	2023	1. divisjon	25	2	3	0	—		28	2
KFUM Oslo	2024	Eliteserien	13	0	2	0	—		15	0
KFUM Oslo	Total		38	2	5	0	—		43	2
Career total			231	13	23	1	2	0	256	14

== Honours ==
=== Club ===
Lokomotiv Plovdiv

- Bulgarian Cup: 2019–20

Individual

- Norwegian First Division Player of the Month: September 2023
