= Daniel Fredheim Holm =

Norwegian footballer and coach (born 1985)

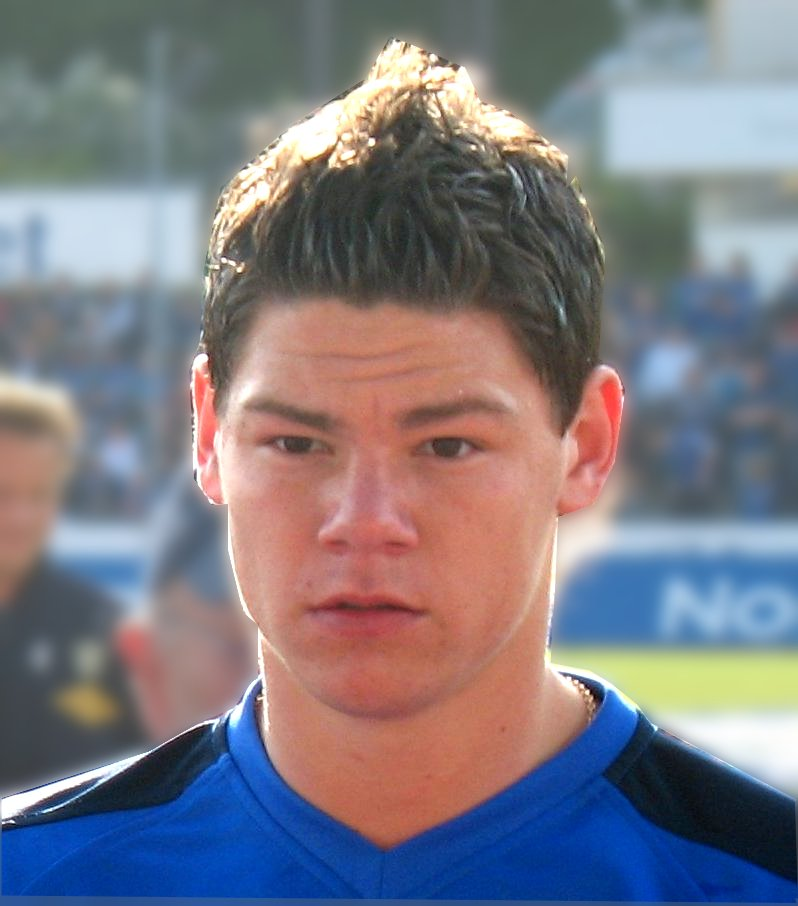

Personal information
- Full name: Daniel Fredheim Holm
- Date of birth: 30 July 1985 (age 41)
- Place of birth: Oslo, Norway
- Height: 1.80 m (5 ft 11 in)
- Position: Attacking midfielder

Senior career*
| Years | Team | Apps | (Gls) |
| 2001–2003 | Skeid | 53 | (11) |
| 2004–2009 | Vålerenga | 122 | (22) |
| 2009–2011 | AaB | 13 | (3) |
| 2011–2013 | Rosenborg | 45 | (4) |
| 2013–2018 | Vålerenga | 120 | (11) |
| 2019–2022 | KFUM | 22 | (1) |

International career
| 2001 | Norway U17 | 2 | (0) |
| 2002–2003 | Norway U18 | 15 | (6) |
| 2003–2004 | Norway U19 | 7 | (1) |
| 2004–2006 | Norway U21 | 16 | (3) |
| 2007–2008 | Norway | 3 | (0) |

Managerial career
- 2019–2024: KFUM (assistant)
- * Club domestic league appearances and goals as of 22 December 2020

Daniel Fredheim Holm (born 30 July 1985) is a Norwegian footballer who plays as a midfielder and works as a sporting director for KFUM in the Eliteserien. He is the half-brother of former Vålerenga colleague Thomas Holm, and the son of former footballer Paal Fredheim.

== Club ==
Fredheim Holm was transferred from Skeid to Vålerenga in the spring of 2004, for NOK 1,5 million. In his first season in the Norwegian top division, he scored five goals. He was also one of the Cup Final heroes, alongside "Moa", when Vålerenga defeated Stabæk in the 2008 final, to become Norwegian champions.

On 9 July 2009, it was announced that Fredheim Holm would leave Vålerenga for Danish side Aalborg.

On 20 January 2011, Fredheim Holm was sold to Rosenborg BK.

On 4 February 2013, Fredheim Holm signed a three-year contract with Vålerenga. He won Tippeligaen 2005 with the Oslo club.

Holm signed with KFUM on 28 November 2018, where he became a playing assistant coach.

== International career ==
He received his first call up in March 2007 against Bosnia and Herzegovina and Turkey, and played in the match against Turkey.

== Career statistics ==
As of 22 December 2020

| Club | Season | League | | | Cup (Note: All appearances in the Norwegian Football Cup) | | Continental | | Total | |
| Club | Season | Division | Apps | Goals | Apps | Goals | Apps | Goals | Apps | Goals |
|---|---|---|---|---|---|---|---|---|---|---|
| Skeid | 2001 | 1. divisjon | 4 | 0 | 0 | 0 | – | | 4 | 0 |
| Skeid | 2002 | 1. divisjon | 24 | 1 | 3 | 0 | – | | 27 | 1 |
| Skeid | 2003 | 1. divisjon | 25 | 10 | 5 | 1 | – | | 30 | 11 |
| Skeid | Total | | 53 | 11 | 8 | 1 | 0 | 0 | 61 | 12 |
| Vålerenga | 2004 | Tippeligaen | 25 | 5 | 2 | 0 | – | | 27 | 5 |
| Vålerenga | 2005 | Tippeligaen | 24 | 4 | 4 | 2 | 3 (Note: Appearances in the UEFA Champions League) | 0 | 31 | 6 |
| Vålerenga | 2006 | Tippeligaen | 22 | 4 | 4 | 1 | 2 | 1 | 28 | 6 |
| Vålerenga | 2007 | Tippeligaen | 23 | 4 | 4 | 1 | 5 (Note: Appearances in the UEFA Cup/UEFA Europa League) | 0 | 32 | 5 |
| Vålerenga | 2008 | Tippeligaen | 21 | 4 | 5 | 3 | – | | 26 | 7 |
| Vålerenga | 2009 | Tippeligaen | 7 | 1 | 1 | 0 | 0 | 0 | 8 | 1 |
| Vålerenga | Total | | 122 | 22 | 20 | 7 | 10 | 1 | 152 | 30 |
| AaB | 2009–10 | Superliga | 13 | 3 | 0 | 0 | 2 | 0 | 15 | 3 |
| Rosenborg | 2011 | Tippeligaen | 17 | 1 | 2 | 0 | 2 (Note: One appearance in the Champions League, one appearance in the Europa League) | 0 | 21 | 1 |
| Rosenborg | 2012 | Tippeligaen | 28 | 3 | 2 | 0 | 12 | 1 | 42 | 4 |
| Rosenborg | Total | | 45 | 4 | 4 | 0 | 14 | 1 | 63 | 5 |
| Vålerenga | 2013 | Tippeligaen | 24 | 1 | 3 | 1 | – | | 27 | 2 |
| Vålerenga | 2014 | Tippeligaen | 20 | 1 | 4 | 3 | – | | 24 | 4 |
| Vålerenga | 2015 | Tippeligaen | 24 | 7 | 0 | 0 | – | | 24 | 7 |
| Vålerenga | 2016 | Tippeligaen | 20 | 1 | 2 | 0 | – | | 22 | 1 |
| Vålerenga | 2017 | Eliteserien | 11 | 0 | 2 | 0 | – | | 13 | 0 |
| Vålerenga | 2018 | Eliteserien | 21 | 1 | 1 | 0 | – | | 22 | 1 |
| Vålerenga | Total | | 120 | 11 | 12 | 4 | 0 | 0 | 132 | 15 |
| KFUM | 2019 | 1. divisjon | 11 | 1 | 3 | 0 | – | | 14 | 1 |
| KFUM | 2020 | 1. divisjon | 3 | 0 | 0 | 0 | – | | 3 | 0 |
| KFUM | Total | | 14 | 1 | 3 | 0 | - | - | 17 | 1 |
| Career total | | | 367 | 52 | 47 | 12 | 26 | 2 | 440 | 66 |
