= Mohammed Fellah =

Norwegian footballer (born 1989)

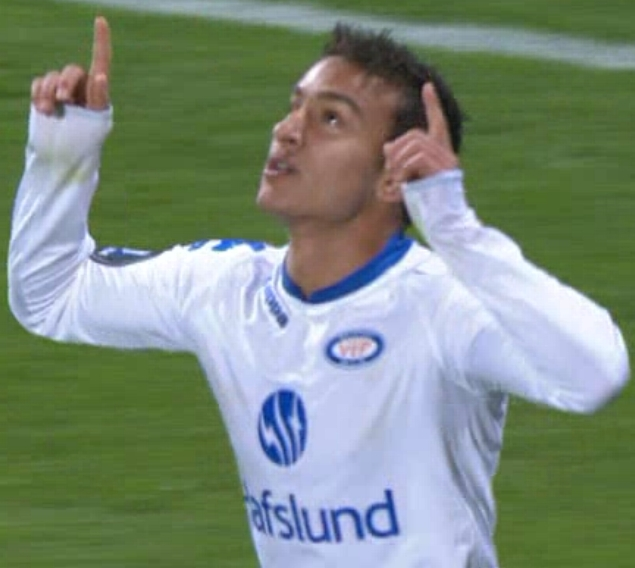
- Fellah with Vålerenga in 2010

Personal information
- Full name: Mohammed Fellah
- Date of birth: 24 May 1989 (age 37)
- Place of birth: Oslo, Norway
- Height: 1.67 m (5 ft 6 in)
- Position: Attacking midfielder

Youth career
- 1995–2004: Holmlia
- 2004–2006: Vålerenga

Senior career*
Years	Team	Apps	(Gls)
2006–2013	Vålerenga	121	(17)
2013–2016	Esbjerg fB	55	(3)
2016–2018	FC Nordsjælland	12	(0)
2018	→ OB (loan)	3	(0)
2018	Sandefjord	4	(2)
2019	Vålerenga	6	(0)
Total		202	(22)

International career
2004	Norway U15	4	(0)
2005	Norway U16	6	(1)
2006	Norway U17	4	(1)
2006–2007	Norway U18	12	(1)
2007	Norway U19	5	(2)
2010	Norway U21	3	(3)
2013	Norway	2	(0)
- * Club domestic league appearances and goals

Mohammed Fellah (Arabic: محمد فلاح; born 24 May 1989) is a Norwegian former professional footballer who played as a midfielder.

== Club career ==
=== Vålerenga ===
Fellah was born in Oslo to Moroccan parents from Al Hoceima and was raised in Holmlia, a multicultural satellite town in southern part of Oslo. He started his football career with local side Holmlia SK before being discovered by Vålerenga. Fellah scored in his debut for Vålerenga in Tippeligaen. on 10 September 2006 in a match against Fredrikstad.

When the Norway U18 team met Turkey twice in three days in August 2007, Fellah was badly injured in a challenge with Serdar Aziz in the second game and broke his calf bone. He required surgery, and lost the rest of the 2007 season. The injury would not heal properly, and during the fall of 2008 he had to operate again. Fellah came back fully in the 2009 season playing a total of 23 games in Tippeligaen.

Fellah started Vålerenga's first 14 matches in Tippeligaen in the 2010 season and was voted "man of the match" in three of the games by Norwegian newspaper Verdens Gang.

=== Esbjerg ===
In August 2013 Fellah moved to Danish Superliga side Esbjerg fB on a three-year contract.

=== Nordsjælland ===
In May 2016, Fellah moved to Danish Superliga side FC Nordsjælland on a three-year contract.

=== Sandefjord ===
On 31 August 2018 Fellah signed a one-year deal with Sandefjord.

=== Return to Vålerenga ===
In September 2019, Fellah returned to Vålerenga.

== International career ==
=== Youth ===
Fellah is of Moroccan descent, but has represented Norway at youth international level. He played for the Norway U-17 national team in qualifiers for the 2006 UEFA European U-17 Championship, scoring the first goal for Norway in their 3–1 win over Liechtenstein.

=== Senior ===
When Fellah was left out of the Norwegian national team squad for the 2012 King's Cup, which only consisted of players playing in Scandinavia, he stated that he wanted to play for Morocco instead of Norway. One year later he was called up for the Norwegian squad for the friendly matches against South Africa and Zambia in January 2013, and said that he now wanted to play for Norway. He made his debut for Norway against South Africa on 8 January 2013, and started the match against Zambia four days later.

== Personal life ==
In August 2020, Fellah faced allegations of racist harassment related to the sharing of private messages on Instagram. These messages contained sexist and racially offensive content, originating from a user account associated with Fellah. He denied any involvement.

After his retirement, Fellah pursued a career as a sports agent. His nephew, Osame Sahraoui, is also a professional footballer.

== Career statistics ==
Appearances and goals by club, season and competition
Club	Season	League			National cup (Note: Includes Norwegian Cup, Danish Cup)		Europe (Note: Includes UEFA Cup/UEFA Europa League)		Total	
Club	Season	Division	Apps	Goals	Apps	Goals	Apps	Goals	Apps	Goals
Vålerenga	2006	Tippeligaen	2	1	0	0	—		2	1
Vålerenga	2007	Tippeligaen	7	0	2	0	1	0	10	0
Vålerenga	2008	Tippeligaen	2	0	0	0	—		2	0
Vålerenga	2009	Tippeligaen	23	2	6	5	2	0	31	7
Vålerenga	2010	Tippeligaen	29	4	1	0	—		30	4
Vålerenga	2011	Tippeligaen	24	2	2	1	4	0	30	3
Vålerenga	2012	Tippeligaen	25	6	3	0	—		28	6
Vålerenga	2013	Tippeligaen	10	2	2	1	—		12	3
Vålerenga	Total		122	17	16	7	7	0	145	24
Esbjerg fB	2013–14	Superliga	12	0	0	0	1	0	13	0
Esbjerg fB	2014–15	Superliga	25	3	3	0	4	1	32	4
Esbjerg fB	2015–16	Superliga	18	0	2	2	—		20	2
Esbjerg fB	Total		55	3	5	2	5	1	65	6
Nordsjælland	2016–17	Superliga	12	0	0	0	—		12	0
Nordsjælland	2017–18	Superliga	0	0	1	1	—		0	0
Nordsjælland	Total		12	0	1	1	—		13	1
OB	2017–18	Superliga	3	0	0	0	—		3	0
Sandefjord	2018	Eliteserien	4	2	0	0	—		4	2
Vålerenga	2019	Eliteserien	6	0	0	0	—		6	0
Career Total			202	22	22	10	12	1	236	33
