= Monir Benmoussa =

Norwegian footballer (born 1994)

Personal information
- Date of birth: 19 July 1994 (age 32)
- Place of birth: Oslo, Norway
- Height: 1.74 m (5 ft 8 1/2 in)
- Position: Striker

Team information
- Current team: Holmlia
- Number: 99

Youth career
- Holmlia
- Vålerenga

Senior career*
Years	Team	Apps	(Gls)
2013	Vålerenga	1	(0)
2014–2015	Bærum	31	(5)
2016	Fredrikstad	4	(0)
2017	Florø	21	(3)
2018	Lysekloster	8	(4)
2019–	Holmlia	2	(3)
- * Club domestic league appearances and goals as of 17:53, 29 April 2019 (UTC)

Monir Benmoussa (born 19 July 1994) is a Norwegian football striker who plays for Holmlia SK.

He started his youth career in Holmlia SK. He made his Norwegian Premier League debut for Vålerenga Fotball in September 2013 against Molde, but only played that sole game.

Ahead of the 2014 season he joined Bærum SK. Ahead of the 2016 season he joined Fredrikstad. After one season where he only featured in four games, he moved on to Florø SK. He was injured and on free transfer for the first half of 2018, then signed for Lysekloster. In 2019 he returned to his childhood club of Holmlia.
