= Holmlia SK =

Norwegian sports club

- Full name: Holmlia Sportsklubb
- Founded: October 1983
- Ground: Lusetjern kunstgress, Holmlia
- Chairman: Yngvar Øian
- Manager: Per Utne
- League: 4. divisjon
- 2012: 4. divisjon group 3, 3rd of 12
Home colours

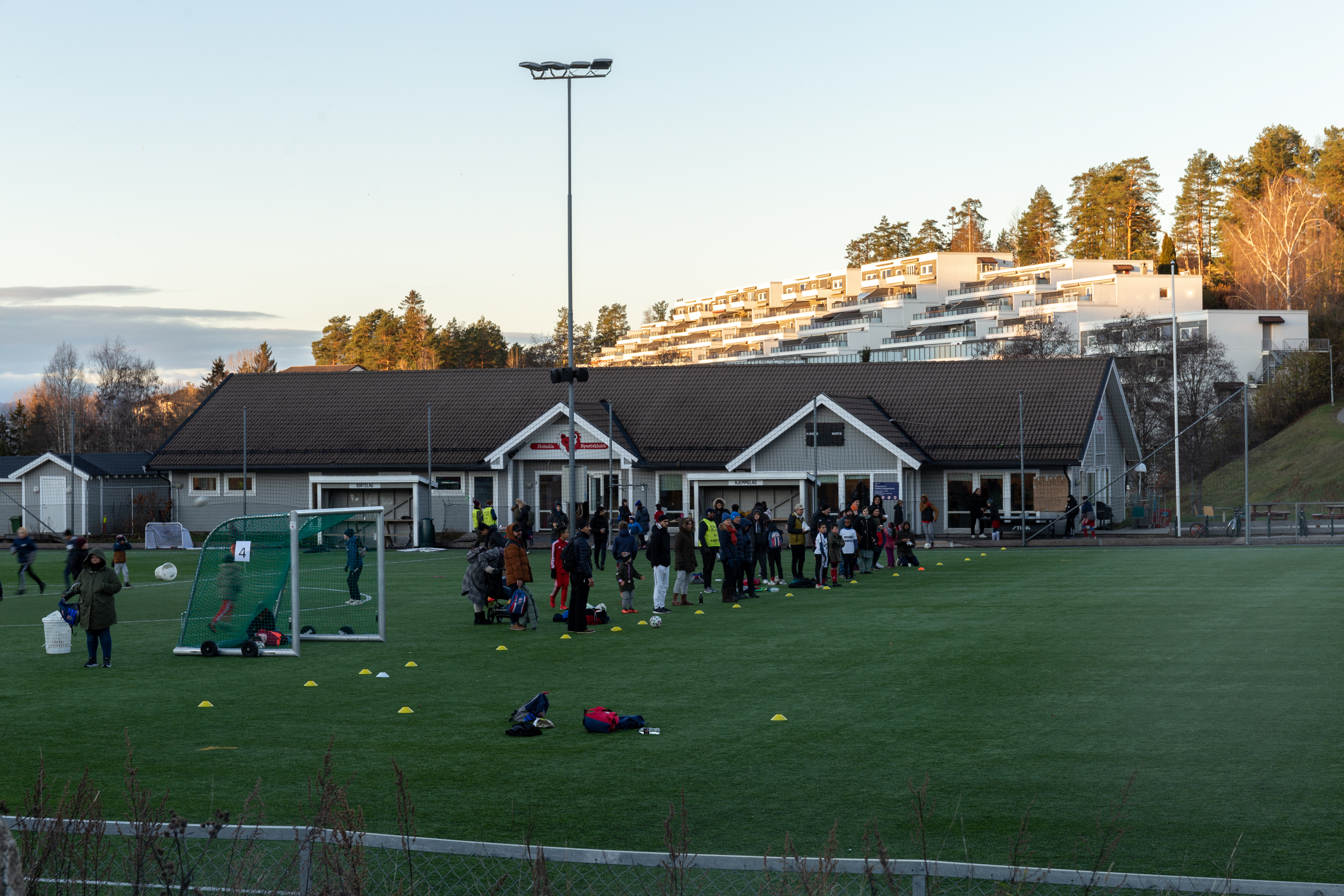
Holmlia Sportsklubb from the front in 2021

Holmlia Sportsklubb is a Norwegian sportsclub from the multi-cultural borough of Holmlia in Oslo, with sections for football, handball, floorball and futsal.

The men's football team plays in the 4. divisjon from 2013, having last played in the 3. divisjon in 2012. The club is also notable for developing talents, who are sold to the Norwegian top division clubs such as Vålerenga and Lillestrøm. Former players include Mohammed Fellah, Mathis Bolly, Jonathan Parr, Akinsola Akinyemi, Haitam Aleesami, Ohi Omoijuanfo, Chuma Anene and Adama Diomande.

The club has won six Norwegian championship in floorball, five for women and one for men.
