= Christian Grindheim =

Norwegian footballer (born 1983)

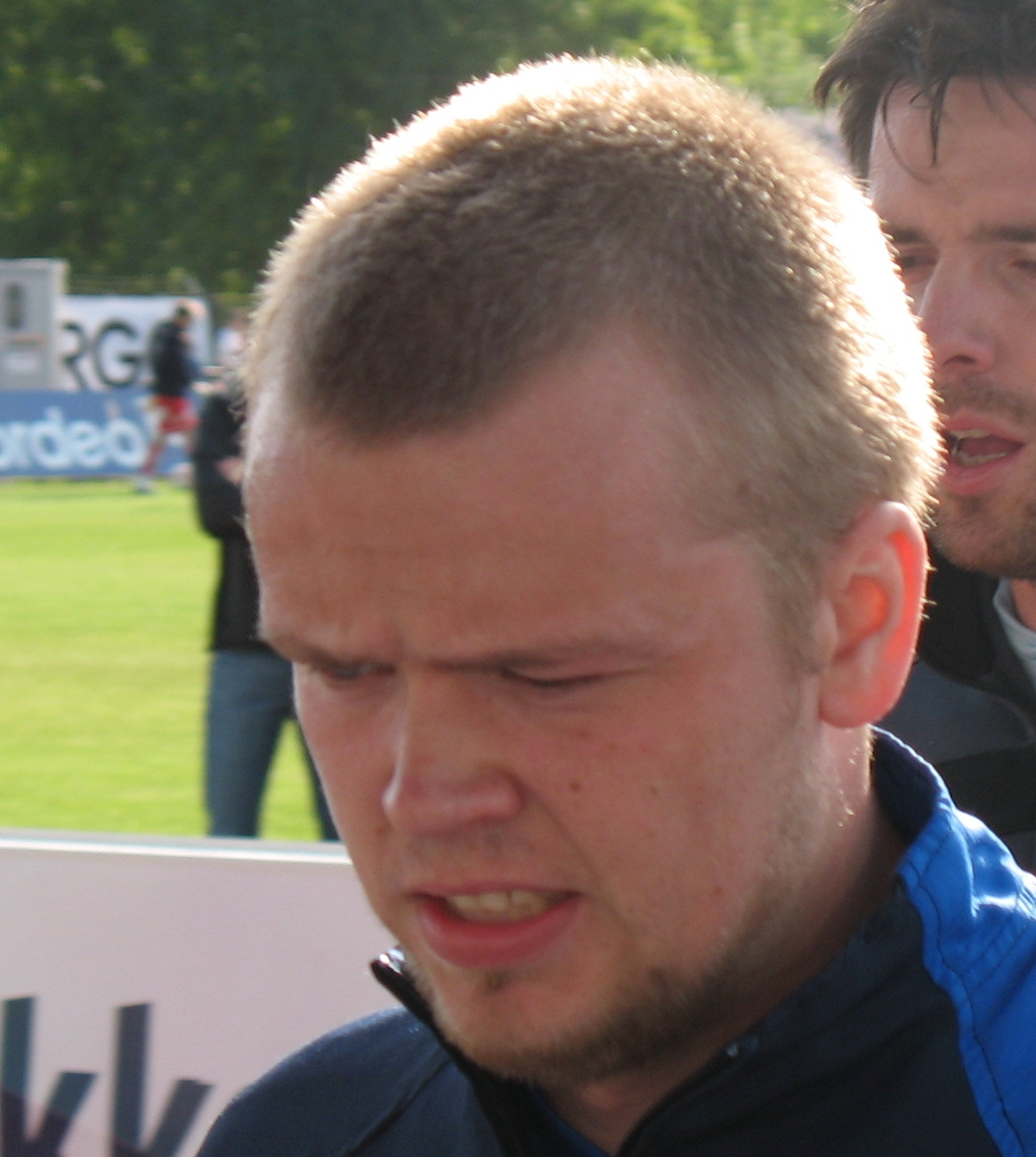
- Grindheim in 2006

Personal information
- Full name: Christian Grindheim
- Date of birth: 17 July 1983 (age 43)
- Place of birth: Haugesund, Norway
- Height: 1.79 m (5 ft 10 in)
- Position: Midfielder

Youth career
- Haugar

Senior career*
Years	Team	Apps	(Gls)
2000–2004	Haugesund	98	(22)
2005–2008	Vålerenga	70	(7)
2008–2011	Heerenveen	97	(7)
2011–2013	F.C. Copenhagen	37	(0)
2013	→ Vålerenga (loan)	14	(0)
2013–2017	Vålerenga	120	(16)
2018–2020	Haugesund	81	(7)

International career^{‡}
2004–2005	Norway U-21	15	(1)
2005–2015	Norway	54	(2)
- * Club domestic league appearances and goals as of 22 December 2020 ‡ National team caps and goals as of 29 August 2015

Christian Grindheim (born 17 July 1983) is a Norwegian retired professional footballer who last played as a midfielder for Eliteserien club FK Haugesund. Grindheim is known as a hardworking midfielder with tough tackling and powerful shots. He has made over 50 appearances for the Norway national team.

== Club career ==
Grindheim was born in Haugesund and started his career in the local club Haugar, before he joined Haugesund where he made his debut for the first team in Tippeligaen at the age of 17. After Haugesund's relegation from the First Division in 2004, several Tippeligaen clubs were interested in his signature.

Viking, with Roy Hodgson as manager, made an offer for Grindheim, but he chose Vålerenga. At Vålerenga, he played regularly for the team that won the league in 2005.

On 7 January 2008, Grindheim joined Heerenveen. Heerenveen paid Vålerenga a reported transfer fee of €3 million. He played 86 matches for the club winning the 2008–09 Dutch Cup.

On 15 June 2011, Grindheim transferred to FC Copenhagen on a three-year contract, for a reported transfer fee of €750,000.

In February 2013, Grindheim returned to Vålerenga on loan with an option to buy, which Vålerenga took up in July 2013, signing Grindheim to a three-year contract.

== International career ==
Grindheim made his debut for the Norwegian national team, on 17 August 2005 in a friendly match against Switzerland. Grindheim played 45 minutes in a match Norway lost 2–0. He scored his first goal in Egil Olsen first match in his second stint as head coach of Norway, the friendly match against Germany on 11 February 2009, He reached his 50th cap in the friendly match against England.

== Career statistics ==
As of 22 December 2020

Club	Season	League			Cup		Other (Note: Eredivisie playoffs)		Total	
Club	Season	Division	Apps	Goals	Apps	Goals	Apps	Goals	Apps	Goals
Haugesund	2000	Tippeligaen	1	0	0	0	–		1	0
Haugesund	2001	1. divisjon	12	1	0	0	–		12	1
Haugesund	2002	1. divisjon	28	5	1	0	–		29	5
Haugesund	2003	1. divisjon	29	7	5	2	–		34	9
Haugesund	2004	1. divisjon	28	9	1	1	–		29	10
Haugesund	Total		98	22	7	3	0	0	105	25
Vålerenga	2005	Tippeligaen	24	2	5	1	–		29	3
Vålerenga	2006	Tippeligaen	24	2	3	0	–		27	2
Vålerenga	2007	Tippeligaen	22	3	3	1	–		25	4
Vålerenga	Total		70	7	11	2	0	0	81	9
Heerenveen	2007–08	Eredivisie	9	0	0	0	4	0	13	0
Heerenveen	2008–09	Eredivisie	30	4	3	1	–		33	5
Heerenveen	2009–10	Eredivisie	28	1	2	0	–		30	1
Heerenveen	2010–11	Eredivisie	30	2	2	0	–		32	2
Heerenveen	Total		97	7	7	1	4	0	108	8
Copenhagen	2011–12	Superliga	30	0	5	0	–		35	0
Copenhagen	2012–13	Superliga	7	0	1	0	–		8	0
Copenhagen	Total		37	0	6	0	0	0	43	0
Vålerenga	2013	Tippeligaen	24	1	3	0	–		27	1
Vålerenga	2014	Tippeligaen	29	4	2	0	–		31	4
Vålerenga	2015	Tippeligaen	30	5	0	0	–		30	5
Vålerenga	2016	Tippeligaen	28	1	3	0	–		31	1
Vålerenga	2017	Eliteserien	23	5	4	0	–		27	5
Vålerenga	Total		134	16	12	0	0	0	146	16
Haugesund	2018	Eliteserien	28	4	3	1	–		31	5
Haugesund	2019	Eliteserien	28	3	2	0	–		30	3
Haugesund	2020	Eliteserien	25	0	0	0	–		25	0
Haugesund	Total		81	7	5	1	0	0	86	8
Career total			517	59	48	7	4	0	569	66

=== International ===
Appearances and goals by national team and year
National team	Year	Apps	Goals
Norway	2005	6	0
Norway	2006	4	0
Norway	2007	5	0
Norway	2008	7	0
Norway	2009	9	1
Norway	2010	9	1
Norway	2011	8	0
Norway	2012	4	0
Norway	2013	1	0
Norway	2014	1	0
Total		54	2

Scores and results list Norway's goal tally first, score column indicates score after each Grindheim goal.

List of international goals scored by Christian Grindheim
No.	Date	Venue	Opponent	Score	Result	Competition
1	11 February 2009	LTU Arena, Düsseldorf, Germany	Germany	1–0	1–0	Friendly
2	29 May 2010	Ullevaal Stadion, Oslo, Norway	Montenegro	1–0	2–1	Friendly

== Honours ==
Vålerenga IF

- Norwegian Premier League: 2005

SC Heerenveen

- KNVB Cup: 2008–09

F.C. Copenhagen

- Danish Cup: 2011–12
