= Marcel Wawrzynkiewicz =

Norwegian footballer (born 1994)

Personal information
- Full name: Marcel Wawrzynkiewicz
- Date of birth: 8 January 1994 (age 32)
- Place of birth: Poręba, Poland
- Height: 1.76 m (5 ft 9 in)
- Position: Defender

Team information
- Current team: Lysekloster
- Number: 33

Youth career
- 2002–2007: MKS Poręba
- 2007–2010: Vålerenga
- 2011–2012: GKS Katowice

Senior career*
Years	Team	Apps	(Gls)
2012–2013	Vålerenga	18	(0)
2014	Cracovia	0	(0)
2014–2015	GKS Tychy	14	(0)
2015–2022	Egersund	108	(1)
2022	Øygarden	8	(2)
2022–2024	Lysekloster	66	(5)
- * Club domestic league appearances and goals as of 8 January 2025

Marcel Wawrzynkiewicz (born 8 January 1994) is a former Polish professional footballer who played as a defender.

== Career ==
Wawrzynkiewicz signed for Vålerenga in 2012, having formerly played youth football in Vålerenga and then in Poland. He made his debut for Vålerenga in the First Round of the 2013 Norwegian Football Cup against Frigg. He made his league debut on 27 April 2013 in a 2–1 win over Aalesund in which he won praise for his performance.

In August 2015, Wawrzynkiewicz signed for 2. divisjon club Egersunds IK.

Wawrzynkiewicz announced his retirement from professional football after the last match in the 2024-season.

== Career statistics ==
As of match played 26 October 2024

Appearances and goals by club, season and competition
Club	Season	League			National cup (Note: Includes Polish Cup, Norwegian Cup)		Other		Total	
Club	Season	Division	Apps	Goals	Apps	Goals	Apps	Goals	Apps	Goals
Vålerenga	2013	Tippeligaen	18	0	5	0	—		23	0
Cracovia	2013–14	Ekstraklasa	0	0	0	0	—		0	0
Cracovia	2014–15	Ekstraklasa	0	0	0	0	—		0	0
Cracovia	Total		0	0	0	0	—		0	0
GKS Tychy	2014–15	I liga	14	0	2	0	—		16	0
Egersund	2015	2. divisjon	10	0	0	0	—		10	0
Egersund	2016	2. divisjon	18	1	2	0	—		20	1
Egersund	2017	2. divisjon	25	0	2	0	—		27	0
Egersund	2018	2. divisjon	23	0	3	0	—		26	0
Egersund	2019	2. divisjon	25	0	2	0	—		27	0
Egersund	2020	2. divisjon	0	0	0	0	—		0	0
Egersund	2021	2. divisjon	7	0	0	0	—		7	0
Egersund	Total		108	1	9	0	—		117	1
Øygarden	2022	2. divisjon	8	2	0	0	—		8	2
Lysekloster	2022	3. divisjon	16	1	0	0	—		16	1
Lysekloster	2023	3. divisjon	25	0	2	0	—		27	0
Lysekloster	2024	2. divisjon	25	4	4	0	—		29	4
Lysekloster	Total		66	5	6	0	—		72	5
Career total			214	8	22	0	0	0	236	8
