= Fitim Kastrati =

Norwegian footballer (born 1994)

Personal information
- Date of birth: 8 October 1994 (age 32)
- Position: Midfielder

Team information
- Current team: Grorud (U21 coach)

Youth career
- Grei
- –2012: Skeid
- 2012: Vålerenga

Senior career*
Years	Team	Apps	(Gls)
2013–2014	Vålerenga	7	(0)
2015	Hønefoss	11	(3)
2016	Bryne	21	(0)
2017	Grorud	13	(4)
2018	Gefle	7	(0)
2019–2022	Asker	62	(22)
2023	Lørenskog	12	(2)
2024	Grorud	5	(0)
2024	Lørenskog	7	(4)
2025	Linderud	14	(0)

Managerial career
- 2025–: Grorud (U21)
- * Club domestic league appearances and goals as of 6 June 2026

Fitim Kastrati (born 8 October 1994) is a Norwegian footballer who played as a midfielder.

Growing up at Ammerud in Oslo, he is a younger brother of Flamur Kastrati. He played youth football for Skeid. He made his Norwegian Premier League debut for Vålerenga Fotball in September 2013 against Brann.

Ahead of the 2016 season he joined Norwegian First Division side Bryne. After one season he went on to hometown club Grorud. In 2018, he transferred to the Swedish club Gefle IF in Superettan.

Ahead of the 2025 season he took up coaching, as manager of the U21 team of Grorud.

== Career statistics ==
Club	Season	Division	League		Cup		Total	
Club	Season	Division	Apps	Goals	Apps	Goals	Apps	Goals
2013	Vålerenga	Tippeligaen	6	0	0	0	6	0
2014	Vålerenga	Tippeligaen	1	0	1	0	2	0
2015	Hønefoss	1. divisjon	11	3	0	0	11	3
2016	Bryne	1. divisjon	21	0	1	0	22	0
Career Total			39	3	2	0	41	3
