= Kamran Ali Iqbal =

Norwegian footballer (born 1995)

Personal information
- Date of birth: 20 February 1995 (age 31)
- Place of birth: Oslo, Norway
- Position: Defender

Team information
- Current team: Heming

Youth career
- Rommen
- 2010–2013: Vålerenga

Senior career*
Years	Team	Apps	(Gls)
2013–2014	Vålerenga	10	(0)
2015	Nest-Sotra	7	(0)
2015	Lørenskog	10	(1)
2016–2017	Bærum	29	(1)
2018–2020	Grorud	25	(1)
2022–	Heming	4	(0)
- * Club domestic league appearances and goals as of 17 March 2020 ‡ National team caps and goals as of 5 May 2017

Kamran Ali Iqbal (born 20 February 1995) is a Norwegian football defender of Pakistani descent who currently plays for Heming.

He started his youth career in Rommen SK, and later joined Vålerenga Fotball.

He made his first-team debut in the first round of the 2013 Norwegian Football Cup. He made his Norwegian Premier League debut in March 2014 against Molde. In 2015, he played for Nest-Sotra and Lørenskog, before joining Bærum ahead of the 2016 season. After two years he went on to Grorud.

== Career statistics ==
As of 17 March 2020

Club	Season	Division	League		Cup		Total	
Club	Season	Division	Apps	Goals	Apps	Goals	Apps	Goals
Vålerenga	2013	Eliteserien	0	0	1	0	1	0
Vålerenga	2014	Eliteserien	10	0	2	0	12	0
Vålerenga	Total		10	0	3	0	13	0
Nest-Sotra	2015	1. divisjon	7	0	2	0	9	0
Nest-Sotra	Total		7	0	2	0	9	0
Lørenskog	2015	2. divisjon	10	1	0	0	10	1
Lørenskog	Total		10	1	0	0	10	1
Bærum	2016	2. divisjon	10	0	3	0	13	0
Bærum	2017	2. divisjon	19	1	1	0	20	1
Bærum	Total		29	1	4	0	33	1
Grorud	2018	2. divisjon	7	1	1	0	8	1
Grorud	2019	2. divisjon	18	0	2	0	20	0
Grorud	2020	1. divisjon	0	0	–		0	0
Grorud	Total		25	1	3	0	28	1
Career Total			82	3	12	0	93	3
