= Morten Berre =

Norwegian footballer (born 1975)

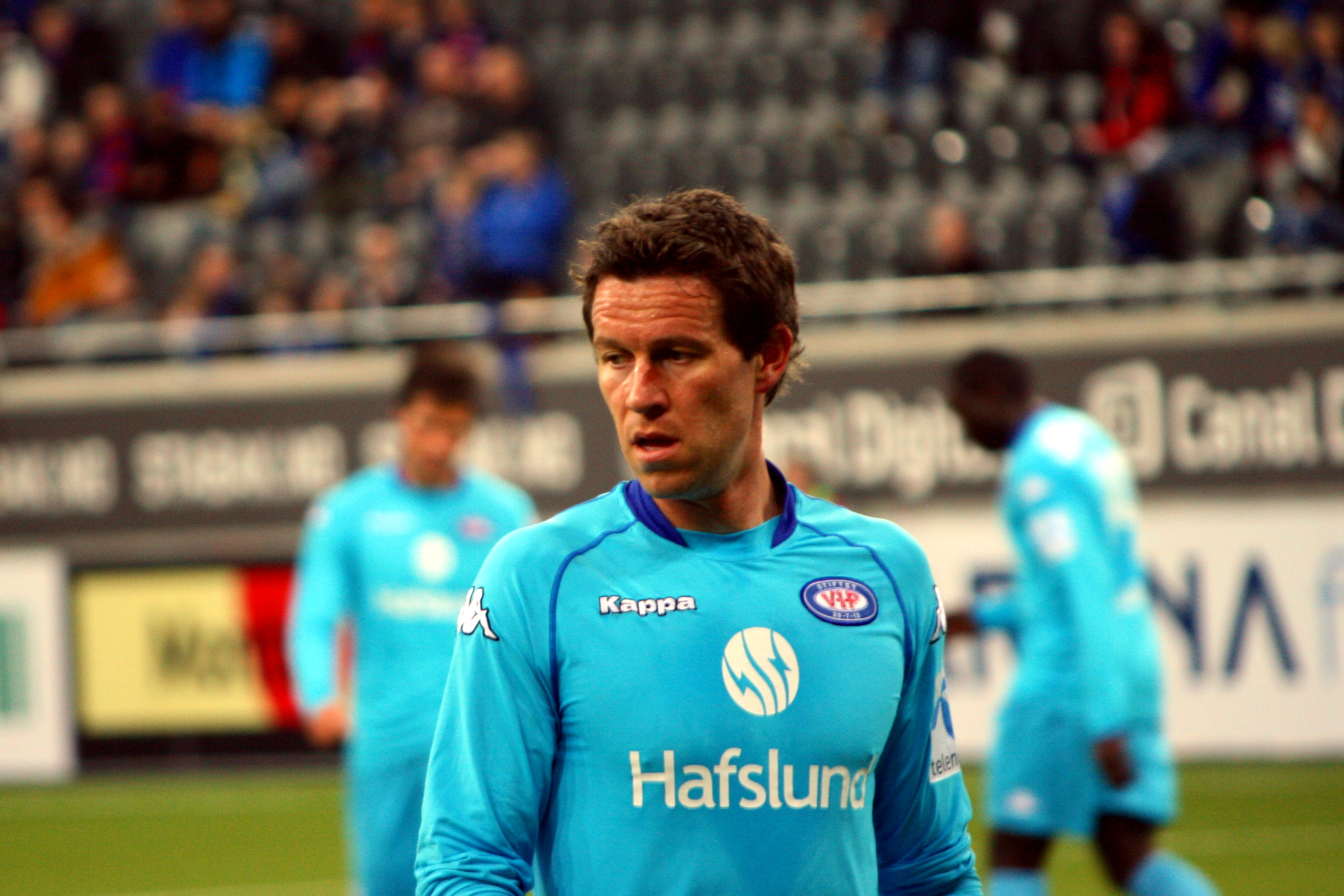
- Berre with Vålerenga

Personal information
- Full name: Morten Gladhaug Berre
- Date of birth: 10 August 1975 (age 51)
- Place of birth: Oslo, Norway
- Height: 1.82 m (6 ft 0 in)
- Position: Winger

Senior career*
Years	Team	Apps	(Gls)
1995–1997	Skeid	61	(11)
1998	Haugesund	25	(10)
1999–2001	Viking	63	(17)
2001–2002	FC St. Pauli	10	(0)
2002	Viking	24	(3)
2003–2015	Vålerenga	298	(61)
2016–2017	Skeid	9	(0)
Total		481	(102)

International career
2001	Norway	1	(0)

Managerial career
- 2016–2023: Skeid (assistant)
- 2024–: Hasle-Løren (director of sports)
- * Club domestic league appearances and goals

Morten Gladhaug Berre (born 10 August 1975) is a Norwegian football coach and former player who played as a winger. With 447 top division appearances, Berre has made the second-highest number of appearances in the Norwegian top division.

== Club career ==
Berre was born in Oslo and started his career at Skeid. He is best known for his spell at Vålerenga, where he stayed for 13 seasons. Berre also played for FK Haugesund and Viking as well as for German club FC St. Pauli. Whilst at Viking he scored one of the goals as they famously defeated Chelsea in the UEFA Cup in 2002.

After eight seasons as assistant manager of Skeid, he left after the 2023 season to become director of sports in Hasle-Løren.

== International career ==
Berre was capped once for the Norway national team.

== Career statistics ==
Appearances and goals by club, season and competition
Season	Club	Division	League		Cup		Europe		Total	
Season	Club	Division	Apps	Goals	Apps	Goals	Apps	Goals	Apps	Goals
FK Haugesund	1998	Tippeligaen	25	10			–	–	25	10
Viking	1999	Tippeligaen	13	6	0	0	0	0	13	6
Viking	2000	Tippeligaen	25	5	5	1	0	0	30	6
Viking	2001	Tippeligaen	25	6	6	3	6	0	37	9
Viking	Total		63	17	11	4	6	0	80	21
FC St. Pauli	2001–02	Bundesliga	10	0	0	0	0	0	10	0
Viking	2002	Tippeligaen	24	3	4	2	4	1	32	6
Vålerenga	2003	Tippeligaen	21	3	3	0	6	1	30	4
Vålerenga	2004	Tippeligaen	21	3	2	0	0	0	23	3
Vålerenga	2005	Tippeligaen	25	9	6	0	3	0	34	9
Vålerenga	2006	Tippeligaen	22	7	3	0	2	0	27	7
Vålerenga	2007	Tippeligaen	25	9	3	2	5	1	33	12
Vålerenga	2008	Tippeligaen	19	1	5	0	0	0	24	1
Vålerenga	2009	Tippeligaen	25	1	5	0	2	1	32	2
Vålerenga	2010	Tippeligaen	30	6	0	0	0	0	30	6
Vålerenga	2011	Tippeligaen	20	5	0	0	3	1	23	6
Vålerenga	2012	Tippeligaen	27	4	2	1	0	0	29	5
Vålerenga	2013	Tippeligaen	26	10	5	1	0	0	31	11
Vålerenga	2014	Tippeligaen	29	2	3	1	0	0	32	3
Vålerenga	2015	Tippeligaen	8	1	2	1	–		10	2
Vålerenga	Total		298	61	39	6	21	4	358	71
Skeid	2016	2. divisjon	6	0	0	0	–		3	0
Skeid	2017	2. divisjon	3	0	0	0	–		6	0
Skeid	Total		9	0	0	0	0	0	9	0
Career total			429	91	54	12	31	5	514	108

== Honours ==
Viking

- Norwegian Cup: 2001

Vålerenga

- Norwegian top division: 2005
- Norwegian Cup: 2008
