= André Muri =

Norwegian footballer (born 1981)

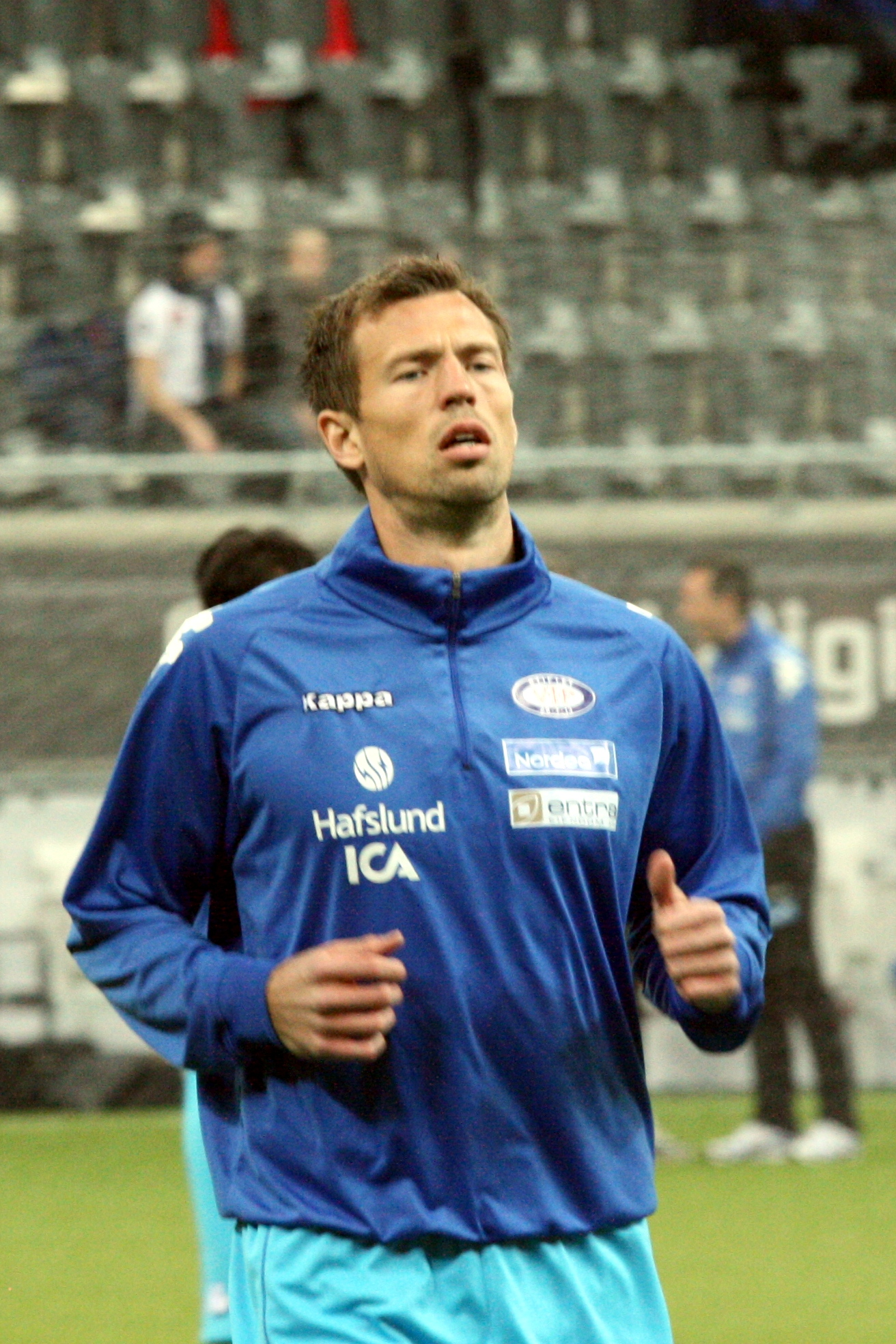

Personal information
- Full name: André Muri
- Date of birth: 22 April 1981 (age 45)
- Place of birth: Oslo, Norway
- Height: 1.92 m (6 ft 4 in)
- Position: Defender

Youth career
- Asker

Senior career*
Years	Team	Apps	(Gls)
2000–2004	Stabæk	90	(2)
2005–2015	Vålerenga	205	(15)
2007	→ Odd (loan)	13	(0)

International career
1999	Norway U18	2	(2)
2000	Norway U19	2	(0)
2001–2003	Norway U21	18	(1)
- * Club domestic league appearances and goals

André Muri (born 22 April 1981) is a former Norwegian football defender. He started his career in his local team Asker, before moving to Stabæk in the Norwegian Premier League for some year. But when Stabæk lost the final match in 2004 against Vålerenga, they were relegated for the 2005 season. Vålerenga bought Muri from Stabæk in February 2005. Later in the same year, they won the league championship. In the summer window of 2007, Muri went on loan to Odd Grenland, and returned to Vålerenga after finishing the season at Odd Grenland placed 4th in the league.

== Career statistics ==
As of 22 August 2014

Club	Season	Division	League		Cup		Total	
Club	Season	Division	Apps	Goals	Apps	Goals	Apps	Goals
2000	Stabæk	Tippeligaen	7	1	1	0	8	1
2001	Stabæk	Tippeligaen	7	0	3	0	10	0
2002	Stabæk	Tippeligaen	25	0	6	0	31	0
2003	Stabæk	Tippeligaen	26	0	4	0	30	0
2004	Stabæk	Tippeligaen	25	1	5	0	30	1
2005	Vålerenga	Tippeligaen	25	2	5	0	30	2
2006	Vålerenga	Tippeligaen	15	0	0	0	15	0
2007	Vålerenga	Tippeligaen	8	0	1	0	9	0
2007	Odd	Tippeligaen	13	0	3	0	16	0
2008	Vålerenga	Tippeligaen	19	0	7	0	26	0
2009	Vålerenga	Tippeligaen	21	4	3	0	24	4
2010	Vålerenga	Tippeligaen	30	2	1	0	31	2
2011	Vålerenga	Tippeligaen	30	6	2	0	32	6
2012	Vålerenga	Tippeligaen	25	0	1	0	26	0
2013	Vålerenga	Tippeligaen	28	1	2	0	30	1
2014	Vålerenga	Tippeligaen	4	0	0	0	4	0
2015	Vålerenga	Tippeligaen	0	0	0	0	0	0
Career Total			308	17	44	0	352	17

== Honours ==
- Seriesølv 2010 (League Silver)
- Cupmester 2008 (Cup Champion)
- Seriebronse 2006 (League Bronze)
- Seriemester 2005 (League Champion)
