= Joseph Baffoe =

Swedish-Ghananian footballer

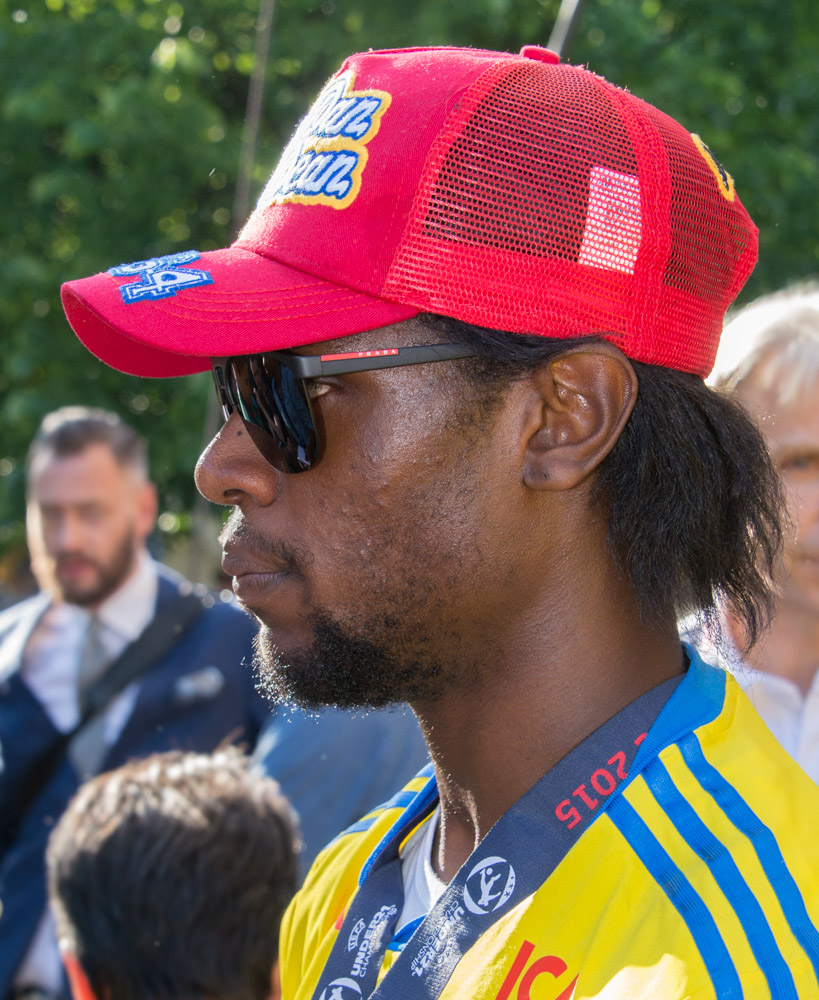
- Baffoe in 2015

Personal information
- Full name: Joseph Baffoe
- Date of birth: 7 November 1992 (age 34)
- Place of birth: Accra, Ghana
- Height: 1.85 m (6 ft 1 in)
- Position: Centre-back

Youth career
- IFK Värnamo

Senior career*
Years	Team	Apps	(Gls)
2008	IFK Värnamo	1	(0)
2009–2013	Helsingborgs IF	33	(1)
2009–2010	→ IFK Värnamo (loan)	39	(0)
2013	→ Vålerenga (loan)	9	(0)
2014–2015	Halmstads BK	34	(1)
2015–2018	Eintracht Braunschweig	53	(3)
2016	→ Eintracht Braunschweig II	1	(0)
2019	MSV Duisburg	1	(0)
2020–2024	Halmstads BK	119	(9)
2025–2026	Örebro SK	13	(1)

International career
2008–2009	Sweden U17	4	(1)
2009–2011	Sweden U19	10	(1)
2011–2015	Sweden U21	17	(0)
Medal record
Men's football
Representing Sweden
UEFA European Under-21 Championship
Winner	2015 Czech Republic
- * Club domestic league appearances and goals as of 16 January 2026

Joseph Baffoe (born 7 November 1992) is a Swedish professional footballer who plays as a centre-back.

== Club career ==
Baffoe started off in IFK Värnamo and played there at senior level for one year. After that he signed for Allsvenska team Helsingborgs IF.

Baffoe signed for Helsingborg as a 17-year-old. His first full game was when they played against F.C. Copenhagen at home at Olympia.

On 26 July 2015, Baffoe signed a three-year contract with German 2. Bundesliga side Eintracht Braunschweig. He left the club at the end of his contract in summer 2018.

In July 2018, Baffoe's planned trial with Hamburger SV, newly relegated to the 2. Bundesliga, was called off due to lacking fitness. On 7 January 2019, he joined MSV Duisburg. He left Duisburg after the 2018–19 season.

== Personal life ==
Baffoe's parents have their roots in Ghana.

== Honours ==
Helsingborgs IF

- Allsvenskan: 2011
- Svenska Cupen: 2011
- Svenska Supercupen: 2012

Sweden U21

- UEFA European Under-21 Championship: 2015
