= Nicolai Høgh =

Danish footballer (born 1983)

Personal information
- Date of birth: 9 November 1983 (age 42)
- Place of birth: Næsbjerg, Denmark
- Height: 1.90 m (6 ft 3 in)
- Position: Defender

Senior career*
Years	Team	Apps	(Gls)
2003–2013	Esbjerg fB	239	(13)
2013–2015	Vålerenga	23	(2)
2015–2017	AB	38	(0)
2017–2019	Greve IF		
2019–2020	KFUM Roskilde		

International career
2002–2004	Denmark U-20	6	(0)
2004–2005	Denmark U-21	7	(0)
- * Club domestic league appearances and goals as of 23 August 2025 (UTC)

Nicolai Høgh (born 9 November 1983) is a Danish former footballer who played as a defender. He spent ten seasons with Esbjerg fB, before joining Vålerenga in July 2013.

== Career ==
=== Club ===
In June 2013, Høgh signed a 2.5-year contract with Tippeligaen side Vålerenga Fotball.

== Honours ==
Esbjerg fB

- Danish Cup: 2012–13
