= Diego Calvo =

Costa Rican footballer (born 1991)

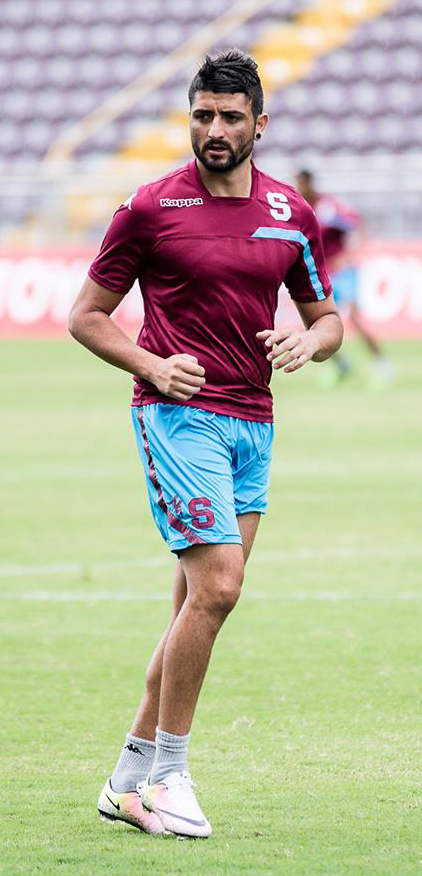
- Calvo with Saprissa in 2016

Personal information
- Full name: Diego Gerardo Calvo Fonseca
- Date of birth: 25 March 1991 (age 35)
- Place of birth: San José, Costa Rica
- Height: 1.75 m (5 ft 9 in)
- Position: Winger

Senior career*
Years	Team	Apps	(Gls)
2010–2013	Alajuelense	55	(5)
2013–2014	Vålerenga	34	(1)
2014	→ IFK Göteborg (loan)	3	(0)
2015	Alajuelense	31	(1)
2016–2017	Saprissa	24	(1)
2016	→ Pérez Zeledón (loan)	12	(1)
2017	Cartaginés	0	(0)
2017	Pérez Zeledón	12	(0)
2017	Real Monarchs	5	(0)
2018	Jicaral	0	(0)
2018	Puntarenas	0	(0)
2019–2021	CF Intercity	0	(0)
2021	Español de San Vicente	0	(0)

International career^{‡}
2013–2014	Costa Rica	10	(1)
- * Club domestic league appearances and goals as of 21 October 2017 (UTC) ‡ National team caps and goals as of 10 June 2014

Diego Gerardo Calvo Fonseca (Note: In this Spanish name, the first or paternal surname is Calvo and the second or maternal family name is Fonseca.) (Spanish pronunciation: [ˈdjeɣo ˈkalβo]; born 25 March 1991) is a Costa Rican former professional footballer who played as a winger.

== Club career ==
A leftsided winger, Calvo started his career at Alajuelense and joined Vålerenga in March 2013 to play alongside compatriot Giancarlo González. On 11 August 2014, he was loaned out to IFK Göteborg.

== International ==
Calvo played for his country at the 2011 FIFA U-20 World Cup.

He made his senior debut for Costa Rica on 22 March 2013 against the United States in the 2014 FIFA World Cup qualifiers at Dick's Sporting Goods Park in Colorado and has, as of January 2014, earned a total of 8 caps, scoring one goal. He has represented his country in 6 FIFA World Cup qualification matches.

=== International goals ===
Scores and results list. Costa Rica's goal tally first.

Goal	Date	Venue	Opponent	Result	Competition
1	26 March 2013	San José, Costa Rica	Jamaica	2–0	2014 World Cup qualifier
