= Jan Gunnar Solli =

Norwegian footballer (born 1981)

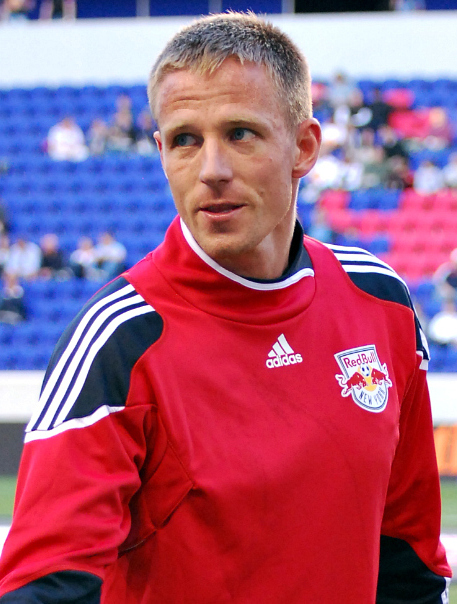

Personal information
- Full name: Jan Gunnar Solli
- Date of birth: 19 April 1981 (age 45)
- Place of birth: Arendal, Norway
- Height: 1.83 m (6 ft 0 in)
- Positions: Right-back; right winger; defensive midfielder

Youth career
- Treungen

Senior career*
Years	Team	Apps	(Gls)
2000–2003	Odd Grenland	54	(0)
2003–2006	Rosenborg	85	(3)
2007–2010	Brann	97	(8)
2011–2012	New York Red Bulls	55	(3)
2013	Vålerenga	21	(2)
2014–2015	Hammarby IF	42	(2)
2016	Skeid	4	(0)

International career^{‡}
2004–2006	Norway U-21	16	(3)
2003–2010	Norway	40	(1)
- * Club domestic league appearances and goals as of 24 November 2016 ‡ National team caps and goals as of 27 January 2010

Jan Gunnar Solli (born 19 April 1981) is a Norwegian former professional footballer. He played as a right-back for the most of his career, but also as a defensive midfielder and right winger.

== Career ==
=== Norway ===
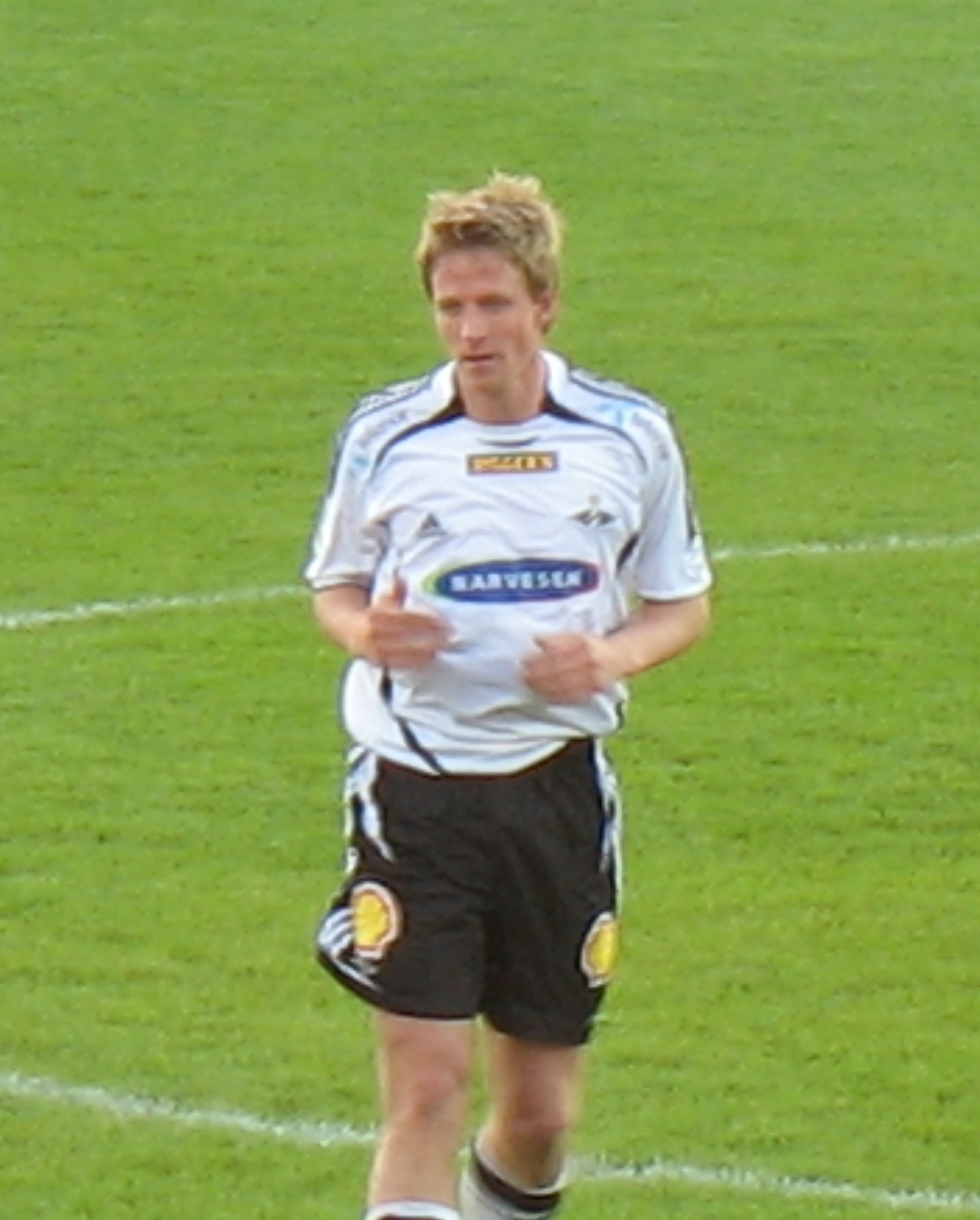
Solli with Rosenborg

Solli made his senior debut for Odd Grenland in the 2000 Tippeligaen season and made five appearances, all as a substitute, in his first season. In total, he played 54 league games for the club over three and a half seasons – and helped Odd reach the 2002 Norwegian Cup Final, where they were beaten 1–0 by Vålerenga. His play with Odd Grenland led to interest from various European clubs including Aston Villa, and AC Milan, with which he had a training stint.

Solli joined Rosenborg of Trondheim in the summer of 2003 and made four starts and ten substitute appearances in the second half of that season as the club won a 12th consecutive league title. During his first season with Rosenborg he scored his first-ever league goal against Viking on 23 August 2003, in his fifth full season as a professional footballer. He was also a regular in the ensuing European campaigns for Rosenborg and scored an important first-leg goal against Maccabi Haifa in the UEFA Champions League third qualifying round in August 2004. He also played an integral role in helping Rosenborg win the 2004 and 2006 league title.

On 16 March 2007, Solli signed a three-year deal with Brann. The transfer fee was 6,000,000 kr. Solli's first season for Brann was a huge success. In partnership with his former Rosenborg colleague Thorstein Helstad, he became an integral part of Brann's title winning squad, and earned a spot on Norway's national squad. During the 2009 season Solli's play with Brann once again led to him receiving interest from other European sides which included German Bundesliga side 1. FC Köln.

=== United States ===
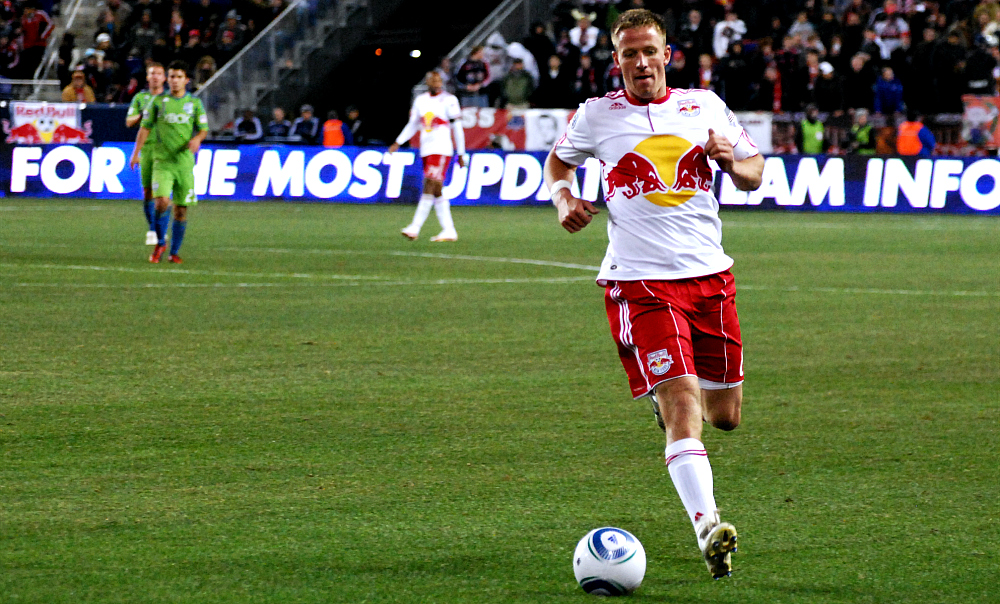
Playing for New York Red Bulls, 2011

Solli signed with Major League Soccer club New York Red Bulls on 24 January 2011. He made his official debut for New York on 19 March 2011, in the Red Bulls' 2011 MLS season opener, a 1–0 victory over Seattle Sounders FC. Solli made 33 official appearances in his first season for New York, playing primarily at right back. In his second season with the club, he scored his first goal for New York on 25 June 2012 in a 3-2 win over D.C. United. On 15 November 2012 New York announced that it would not offer Solli a contract extension, thus ending his tenure with the club.

=== Return to Europe ===
Solli signed with Vålerenga of Norway in February 2013. In March 2014 he signed with Swedish side Hammarby.

=== International ===
Solli made his debut for Norway in a friendly game against Scotland on 20 August 2003 and scored his only international goal in a 3–2 win against Russia on 28 April 2004. He was capped 40 times. Solli also represented Norway at Under-18 and U-21 level.

== Club statistics ==
As of 15 October 2015

Season	Club	Division	League		Cup		Other		Total	
Season	Club	Division	Apps	Goals	Apps	Goals	Apps	Goals	Apps	Goals
2000	Odd Grenland	Tippeligaen	5	0	1	0	–	–	6	0
2001	Odd Grenland	Tippeligaen	13	0	2	0	–	–	15	0
2002	Odd Grenland	Tippeligaen	25	0	6	1	–	–	31	1
2003	Odd Grenland	Tippeligaen	11	0	2	0	–	–	13	0
Total	Odd Grenland	Tippeligaen	54	0	11	1	–	–	65	1
2003	Rosenborg	Tippeligaen	14	1	–	–	2	0	16	1
2004	Rosenborg	Tippeligaen	22	0	2	0	18	1	42	1
2005	Rosenborg	Tippeligaen	25	0	4	1	9	1	38	2
2006	Rosenborg	Tippeligaen	24	2	5	2	5	0	34	4
Total	Rosenborg	Tippeligaen	85	3	11	3	34	2	130	8
2007	Brann	Tippeligaen	25	2	3	2	9	2	37	6
2008	Brann	Tippeligaen	22	1	3	0	6	1	31	2
2009	Brann	Tippeligaen	28	3	4	2	–	–	32	5
2010	Brann	Tippeligaen	22	2	2	0	–	–	24	2
Total	Brann	Tippeligaen	97	8	12	4	15	3	124	15
2011	New York Red Bulls	Major Soccer League	31	0	0	0	2	0	33	0
2012	New York Red Bulls	Major Soccer League	24	3	2	0	–	–	26	3
Total	New York Red Bulls	Major Soccer League	55	3	2	0	2	0	59	3
2013	Vålerenga	Tippeligaen	21	2	2	0	–	–	23	2
Total	Vålerenga	Tippeligaen	21	2	2	0	–	–	23	2
2014	Hammarby	Superettan	25	1	1	0	–	–	26	1
2015	Hammarby	Allsvenskan	17	1	4	0	–	–	21	1
Total	Hammarby	Allsvenskan	42	2	5	0	–	–	47	2
Career Total			354	18	43	8	51	5	448	31

== Honours ==
=== Norway ===
- Norwegian Premier League: 2003, 2004, 2006 and 2007
- Norwegian Cup: 2003

=== Individual ===
- Norwegian Football Association Gold Watch

== Music career ==
Solli is also an acknowledged disc jockey where he performs under the name DJ Solli. Solli has warmed up for Calvin Harris and David Guetta at Lavo, New York and Oslo Spektrum. He has also had gigs at Tryst Nightclub and XS Nightclub in Las Vegas. He has recently started his own music label, Sweet Harmony.
