= Simon Larsen =

Norwegian footballer (born 1988)

Personal information
- Full name: Simon Andreas Larsen
- Date of birth: 1 June 1988 (age 38)
- Place of birth: Kristiansand, Norway
- Height: 1.93 m (6 ft 4 in)
- Position: Defender

Youth career
- Randesund

Senior career*
Years	Team	Apps	(Gls)
2006–2010	Randesund		
2011	Vindbjart		
2012–2016	Vålerenga	118	(9)
2013	→ Hønefoss (loan)	10	(0)
2016–2018	Start	54	(5)
2019–2020	Jerv	49	(6)
- * Club domestic league appearances and goals as of 7 January 2021

Simon Andreas Larsen (born 1 June 1988) is a retired Norwegian football defender.

== Club career ==
He played for the Norwegian team Vindbjart from 2011.

In 2012, he signed for Norwegian team Vålerenga. He made his debut on 10 April 2012 against Viking, they won the game 1–0.

Larsen signed with FK Jerv on 21 December 2018. He retired in 2021.

== Career statistics ==
Club	Season	Division	League		Cup		Total	
Club	Season	Division	Apps	Goals	Apps	Goals	Apps	Goals
2012	Vålerenga	Eliteserien	27	2	3	0	30	2
2013	Vålerenga	Eliteserien	11	1	3	1	14	2
2013	Hønefoss	Eliteserien	10	0	0	0	10	0
2014	Vålerenga	Eliteserien	30	4	3	0	33	4
2015	Vålerenga	Eliteserien	24	1	2	0	26	1
2016	Vålerenga	Eliteserien	26	1	5	0	31	1
2017	Start	1. divisjon	29	5	0	0	29	5
2018	Start	Eliteserien	25	0	4	0	29	0
2019	Jerv	1. divisjon	28	2	2	0	30	2
2020	Jerv	1. divisjon	18	4	0	0	18	4
Career Total			228	20	22	1	250	21
