= HDMS Dannebroge =

Warship of the Dano-Norwegian navy

Coordinates: 55°29.53′N 12°30.17′E

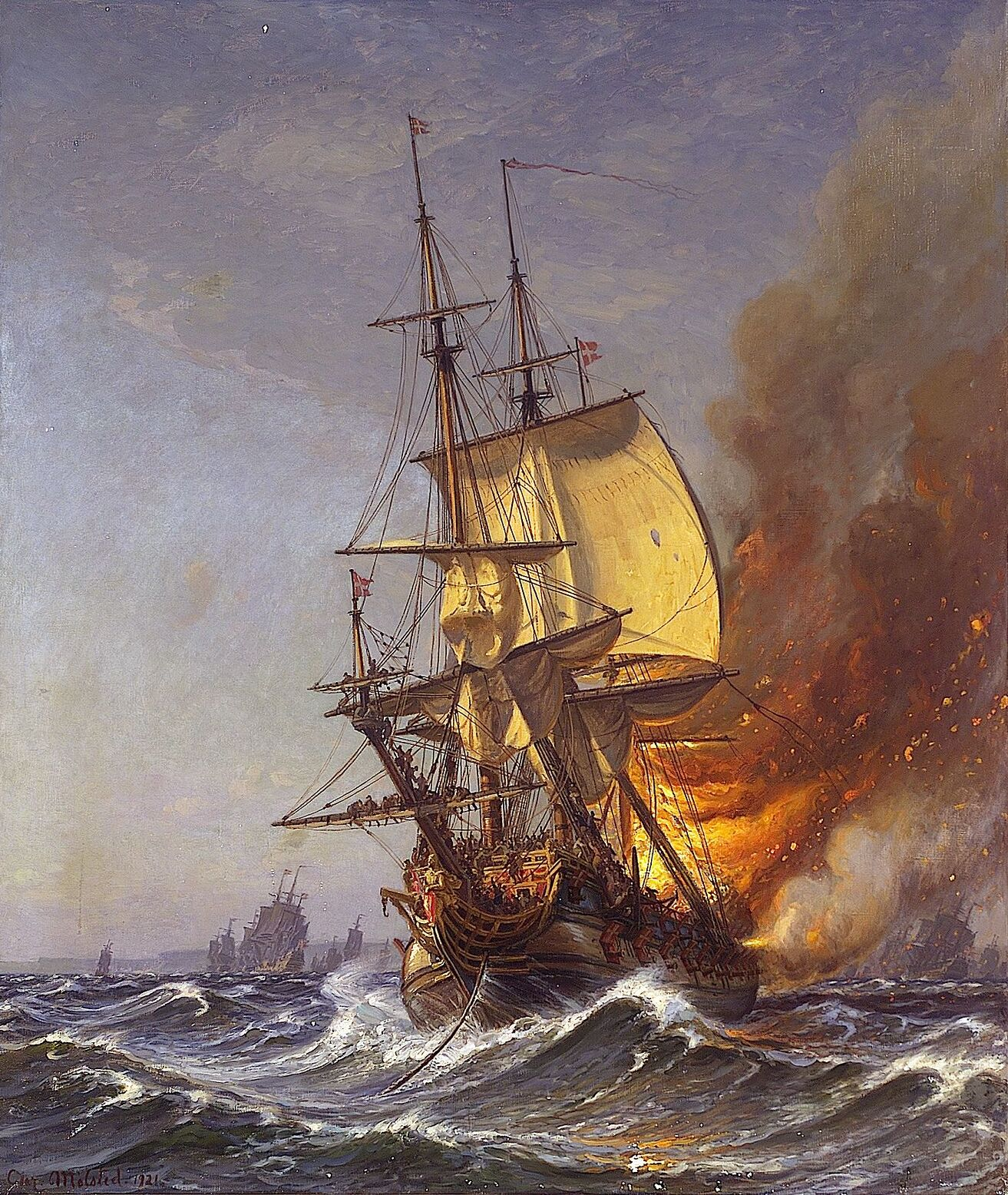
- 1921 Christian Mølsted painting of Dannebroge on fire at the Battle of Køge Bay

History

Denmark
- Name: Dannebroge
- Namesake: The Dannebrog flag
- Builder: H. Span
- Launched: 16 October 1692
- Fate: Exploded and sunk, 4 October 1710

General characteristics
- Type: Ship of the line
- Length: 164 ft (50 m)
- Beam: 12.95 m (42 ft 6 in)
- Draught: 5.25 m (17 ft 3 in)
- Complement: 680
- Armament: In 1710: 20 × 8-pounder bronze cannon; 22 × 14-pounder cannon; 26 × 24-pounder cannon; 4 × 4-pounder cannon; 4 × 14-pounder iron howitzers
- Notes: This was the first ship to be built at Nyholm

HDMS Dannebroge was a ship of the line of the Royal Dano-Norwegian Navy, which exploded and sank on 4 October 1710 during the Battle of Køge Bay of the Great Northern War. Of the 600 crew on board, 541 were killed in the explosion and sinking, one third of the victims being Norwegian. Admiral Iver Huitfeldt was among the dead.

== Construction ==
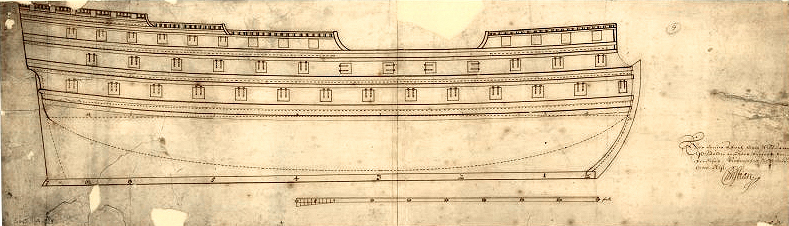
Ship plan of Dannebroge

Built in 1692, Dannebroge was the largest ship-of-the-line in the Dano-Norwegian navy at that time with her 84 cannons placed on two decks and a crew of 600 men. She was also the first ship in Denmark that was built according to a plan drawing.

== Career ==
=== The final battle ===
In 1710 Denmark–Norway was at war with Sweden. The Norwegian-born commander, Ivar Huitfeldt, was in charge of Dannebroge on 4 October 1710. Along with a Dano-Norwegian fleet of 44 other ships, he had set sail for Liepāja (in modern Latvia). The mission was to escort 6,000 Russian troops to the Danish capital of Copenhagen, so they could support Denmark–Norway during the Great Northern War against the Swedes.

However, the fleet was intercepted by a Swedish fleet in the Battle of Køge Bay. According to the commander in chief of the Dano-Norwegian navy, Ulrik Christian Gyldenløve, the fire on Dannebroge was probably ignited by her own cannons. Gyldenløve mentions this in his letter to the king. Gyldenløve followed the battle from his ship Elephanten and wrote the letter at about 9 o'clock in the morning of 5 October. It is unclear how many of the 600 men survived the explosion: some sources say three and others say nine.

== Wreck and commemoration ==
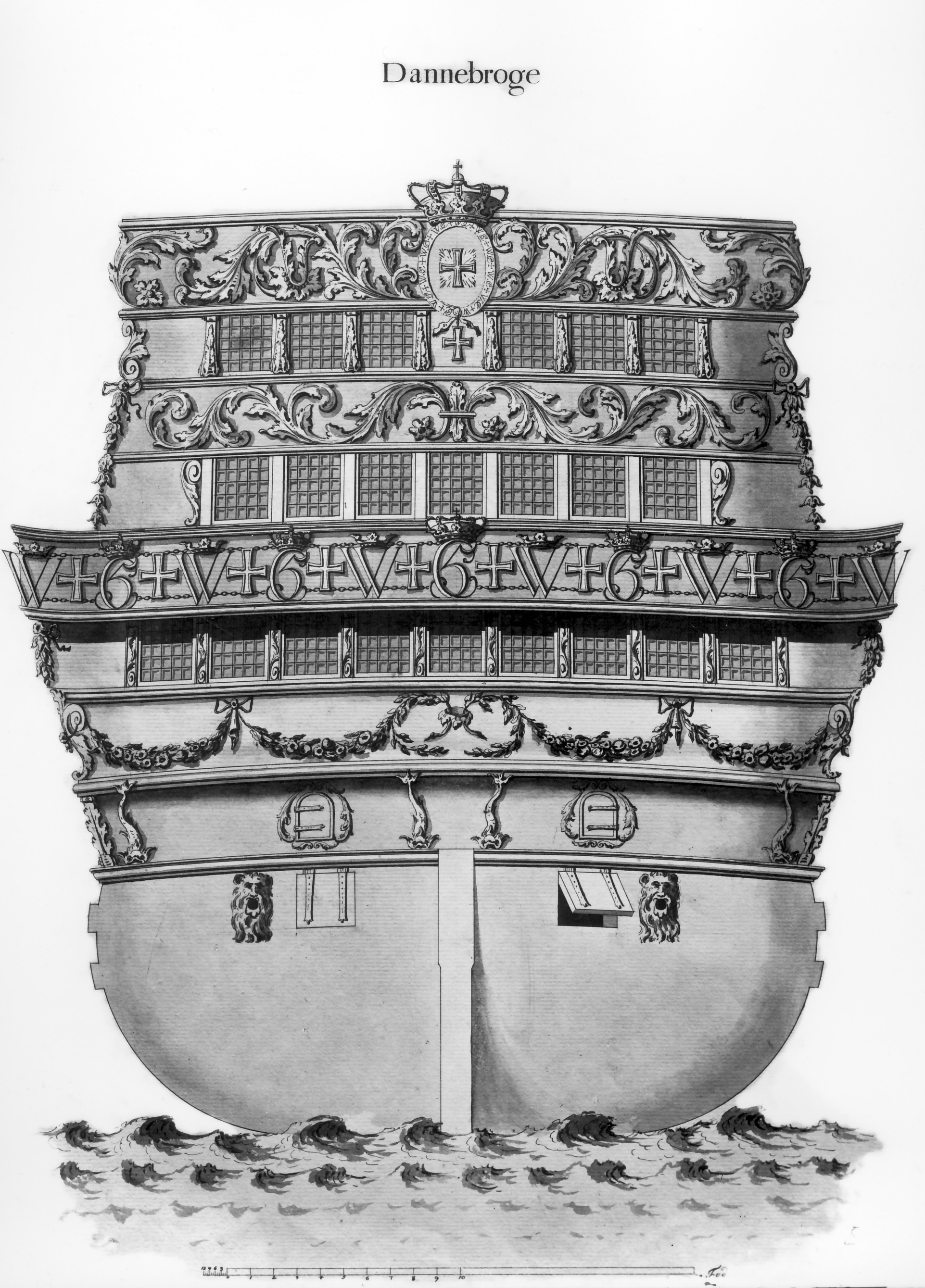
Stern of Dannebroge

Today Dannebroge is the only wreck within Danish sea territory, where it is forbidden to dive. The official Danish institution of cultural heritage, Kulturarvsstyrelsen, considers it to be a cemetery.

Some cannons were salvaged in 1714; others were salvaged in 1875 by the company Svitzer, which also searched for other objects that could be sold at an auction. Some of the cannon were later used by Danish architect Vilhelm Dahlerup in his design of the Ivar Huitfeldt Monument at Langelinie in Copenhagen.

A 1/40 scale model of the ship was built by Orlogsmuseets Modelbyggerlaug ("The guild of model builders at the Naval Museum") in 2010. It was donated to the Royal Danish Navy in October 2010 as part of the celebrations of its 500 year Jubilee.

== Citations ==
- Royal Danish Naval Museum - Skibsregister - Record cards
- Royal Danish Naval Museum – List of Ships
