= Langelinie Pavilion =

Venue in Copenhagen

- Langeliniepavillonen
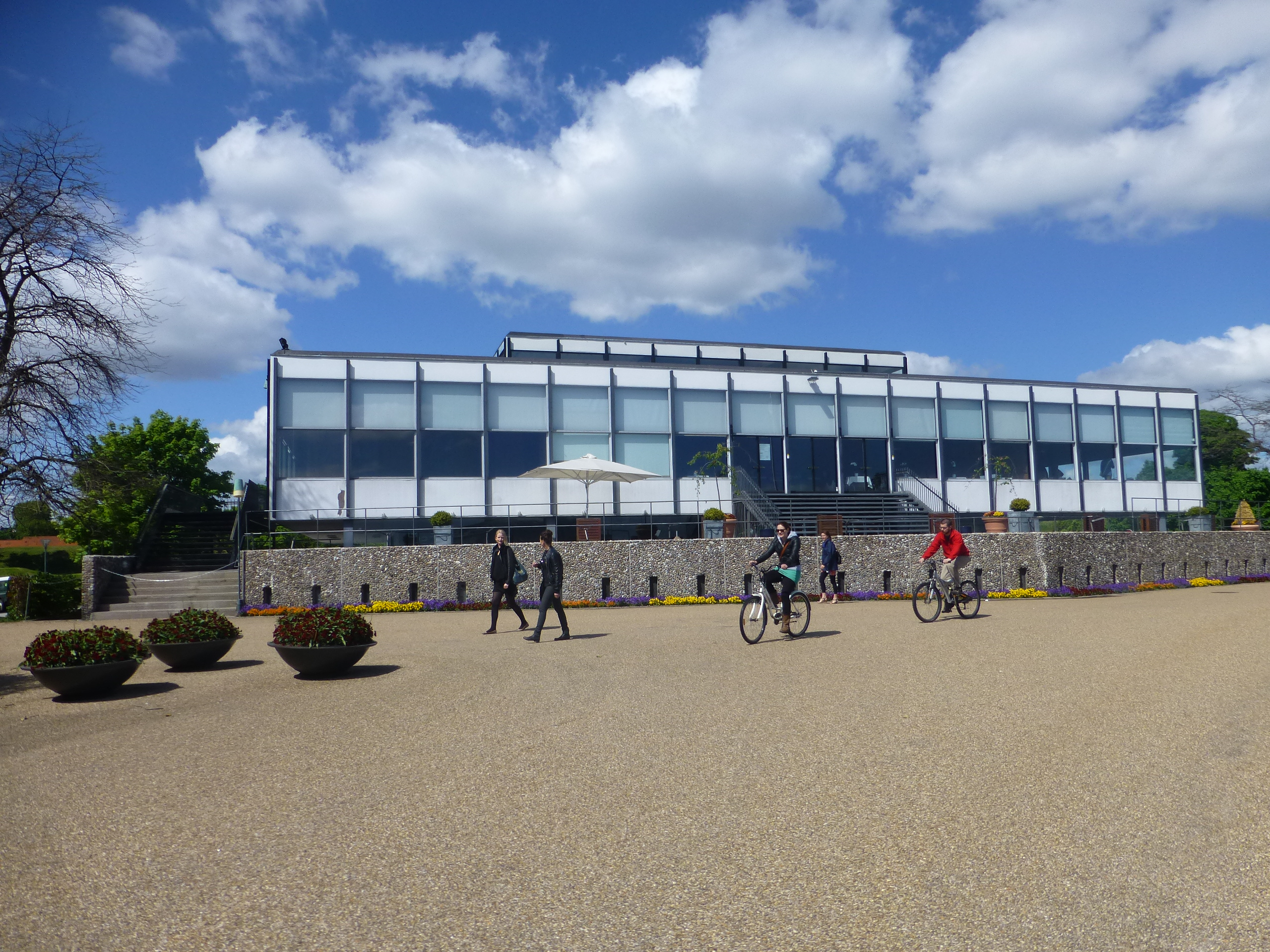
- Interactive map of the Langelinie Pavilion area

General information
- Architectural style: Modernist
- Location: Copenhagen, Denmark
- Coordinates: 55°41′28.78″N 12°35′54.29″E
- Completed: 1956
- Client: Royal Danish Yacht Club

Design and construction
- Architect: Eva and Nils Koppel

The Langelinie Pavilion (Danish: Langeliniepavillonen) is a venue located at the Langelinie waterfront in Copenhagen, Denmark. The first Langelinie Pavilion was built in the 1880s but the current building is a Modernist structure from 1958 and was designed by Nils and Eva Koppel. It was listed on the Danish registry of protected buildings and places by the Danish Heritage Agency on 12 March 2006. Poul Henningsen's PH Artichoke lamp was designed for the building.

The building is located close to the statue of The Little Mermaid and the Ivar Huitfeldt Column.

== History ==
=== The first Langelinie Pavilion ===
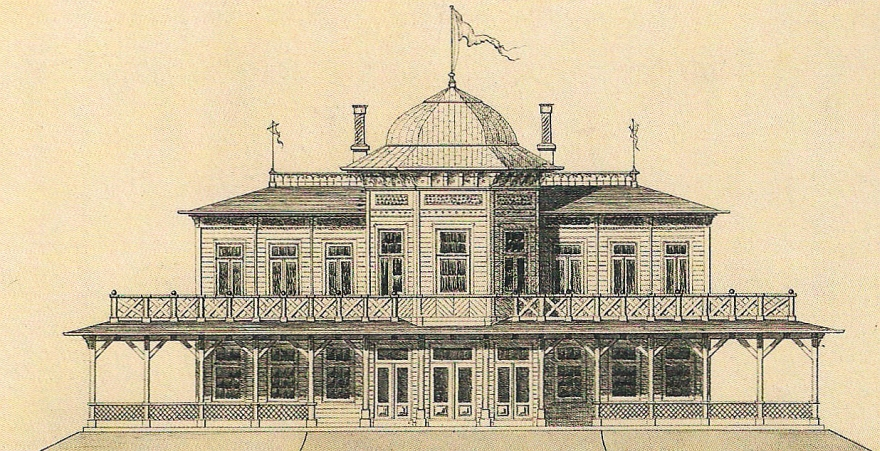
The first Langelinie Pavilion

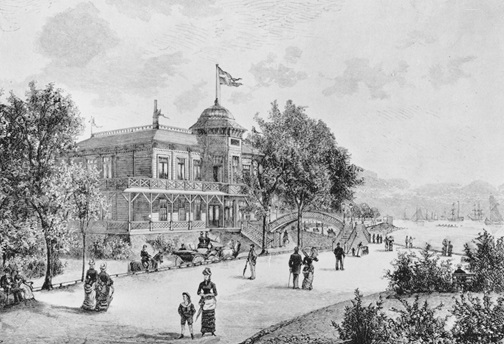
The first Langelinie Pavilion

The first Langelinie Pavilion was built at Pinnebergs Reduit in 1884. It was owned by De Forenede Bryggerrier but contained facilities for the Royal Danish Yacht Club. The building was designed by Vilhelm Dahlerup. Dahlerup was also the designer of a new footbridge, Gefion Bridge, which provided a link between the Gefion Fountain and the Langelinie Park across the access road from the south (now Ved Kongeporten). Later he also served as architect for the adjacent Free Port.

The Langelinie Pavilion contained a restaurant and café in the ground floor and facilities for the Yacht Club on the first floor.

=== The second Langelinie Pavilion ===
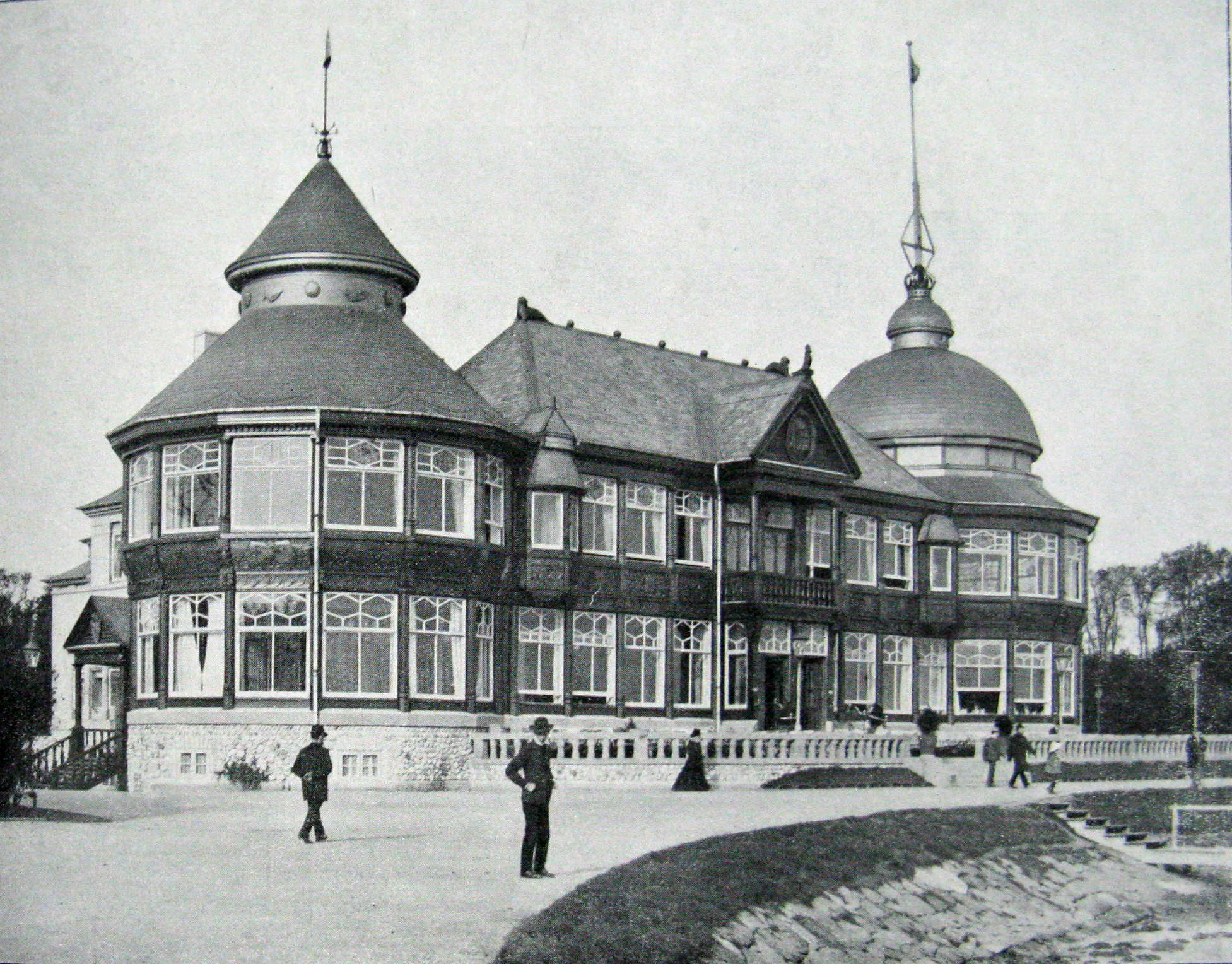
The second Langelinie Pavilion

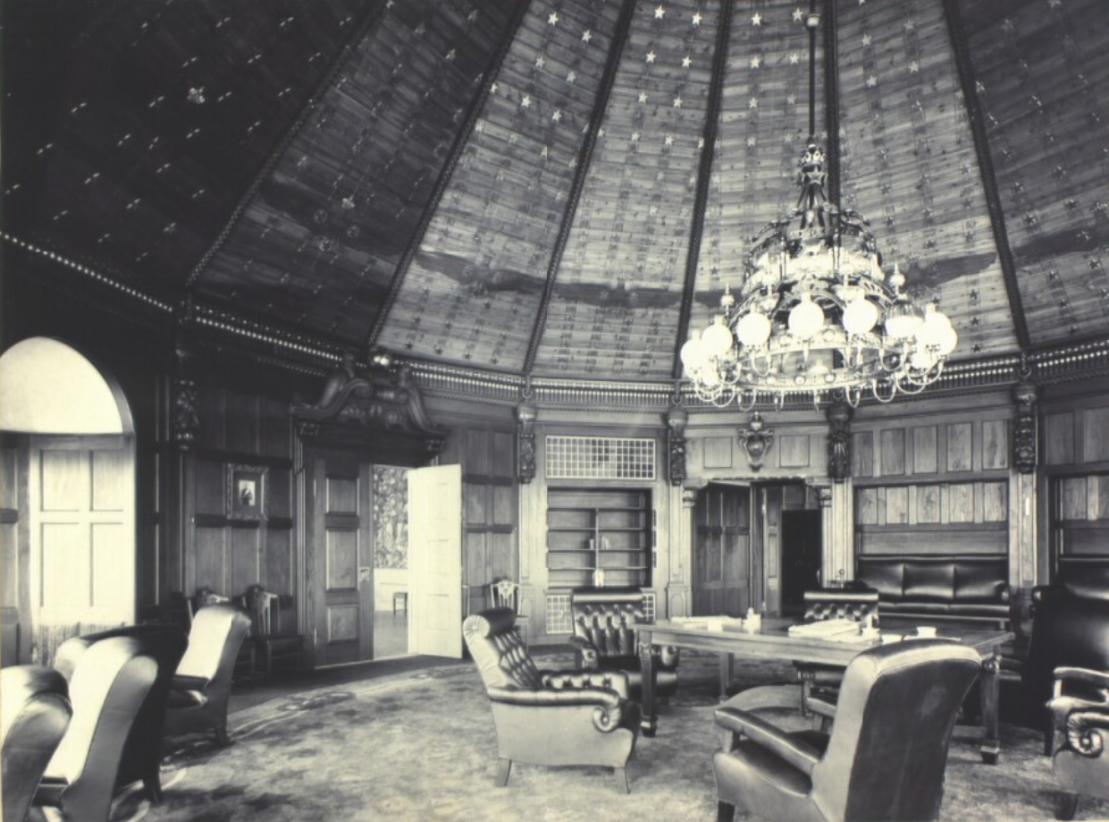
The Royal Danish Yacht Club's salon in 1902

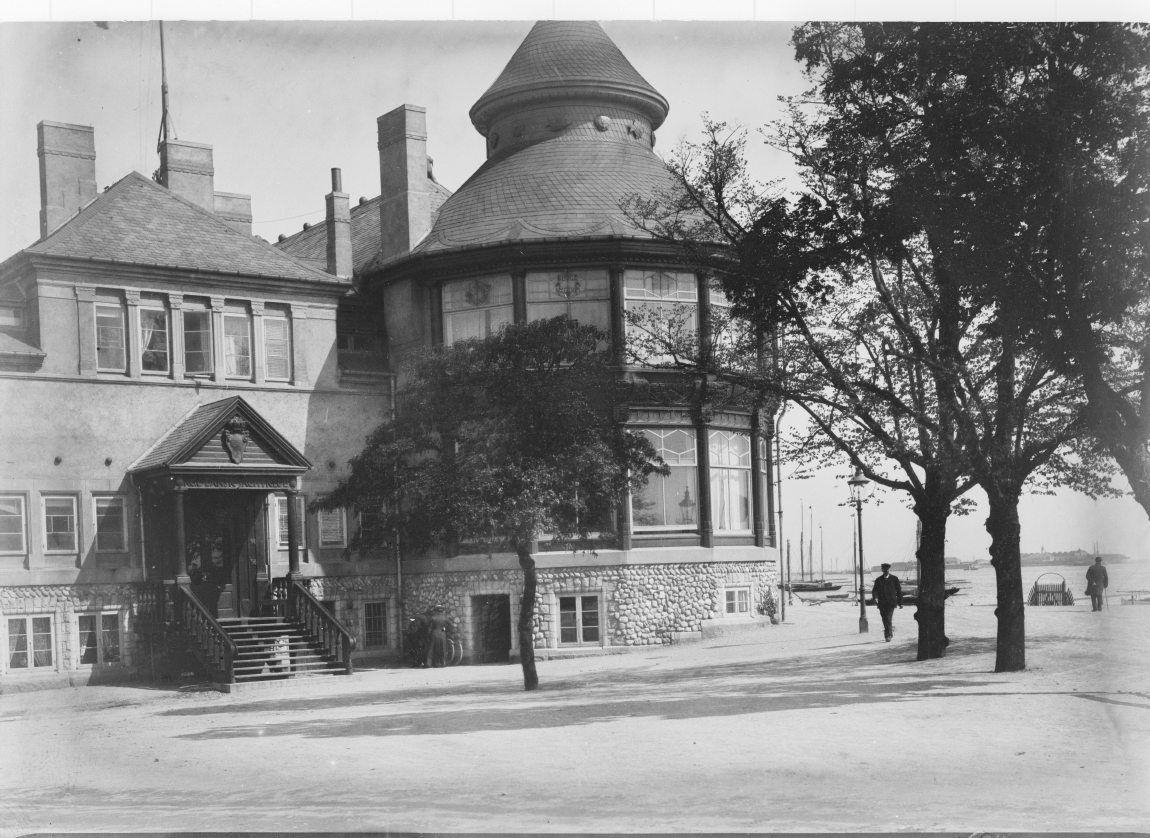
The second Langelinie Pavilion in the 1900s

In 1901, Dahlerup's building was demolished to make way for a new and larger Langelinie Pavilion which was completed the following year to design by Fritz Koch. It had a domed, central banqueting hall and an octagonal pavilion in each end. The restaurant had room for 300 guests and the building contained facilities for the Royal Danish Yacht Club on the first floor.

The Langelinie Pavilion achieved great popularity. On 12 June 1944, the date of the so-called schalburgtage, members of the Schalburg Corps (the Danish branch of the German SS) blew it up as retaliation for the Danish Resistance Movement's activities.

=== The third Langelinie Pavilion ===
After the war, it was discussed whether the Langelinie Pavilion should be rebuilt to its own design but Copenhagen Municipality ultimately launched an architectural competition for the design of a new building in 1954. The competition was won by Niels and Eva Koppel while other awarded competition entries came from Hennuing Larsen and Jørn Utzon. The latter proposed an 11-floor tower-like structure. Construction of the new Langelinie Pavilion began in 1956 and it was inaugurated on 28 February 1958,

The building was left largely unused from 2005. It was revived by a group of investors in 2016.

== Architecture ==
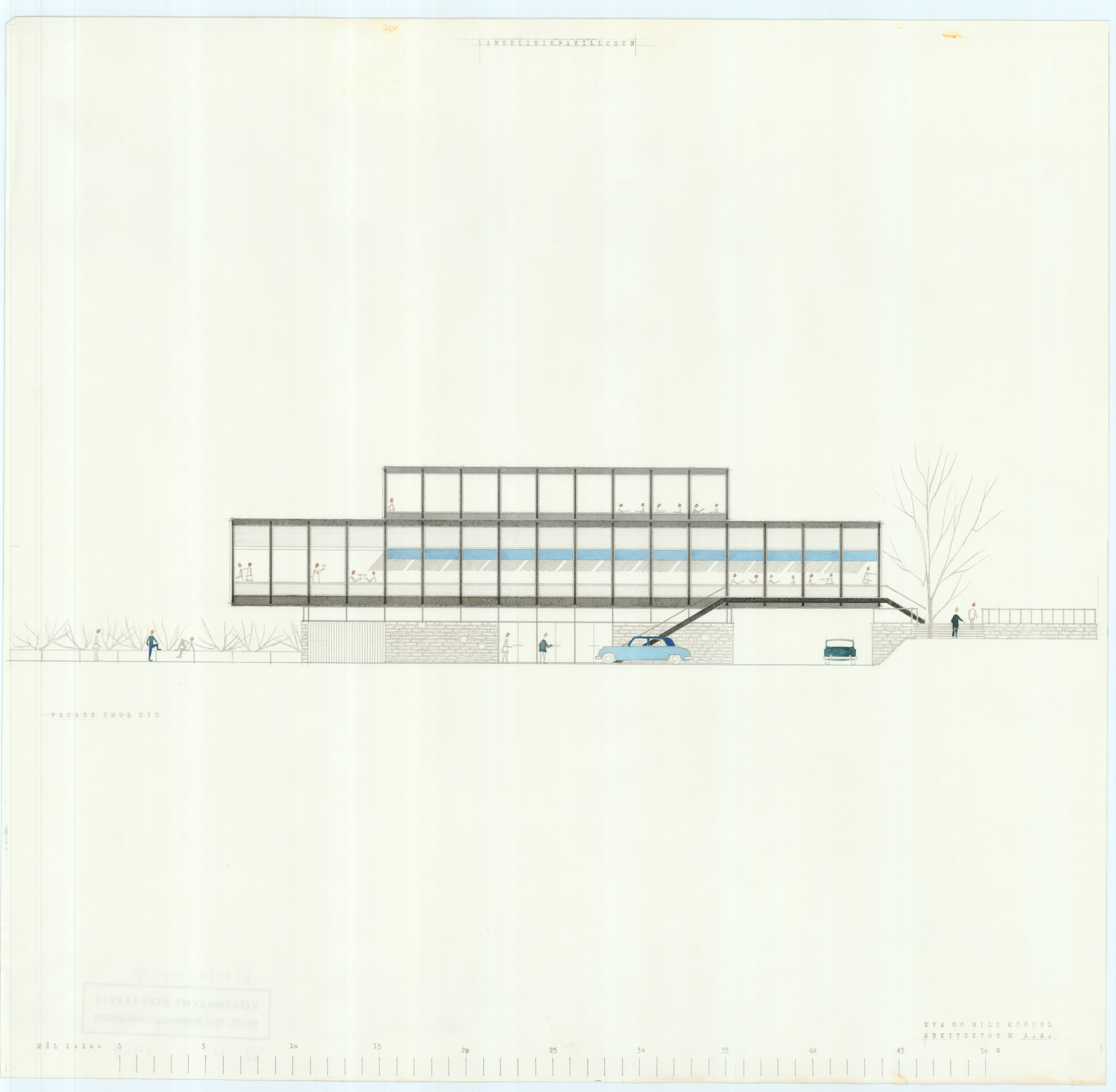
Rendering from 1954.

The design of the current Langelinie Pavilion shows inspiration from Mies van der Rohe and American Modernism. The building is composed of three box-like volumes. The low ground floor is built in reinforced concrete and appears closed with its narrow, highly placed horizontal windows. The "floating" main floor is significantly larger and higher than the ground floor. It measures approximately 30 by 30 metres and has a curtain wall in glass with thin, exterior steel pillars. The upper floor is again smaller and lower than the main floor. It opens to a narrow balcony to the east.

A road lane passes under the main floor on the east side of the building where a large veranda is located.

Poul Henningsen's Artichoke lamo was created for the building. He was charged with designing a lamp that also looked sculptural when not turned on. Some of the rooms on the main floor are decorated with mosaics by Else Alfelt. Børge Mogensen designed the bar, cupboards, and lamps for the Royal Danish Yacht Club's premises on the top floor. The east-facing rooms have later been redesigned by Verner Panton with geometric decorations on walls and the bar as well as lamps of his own design.

The building was listed on the Danish registry of protected buildings and places by the Danish Heritage Agency on 24 July 2005.

== Today ==
The Langelinie Pavilion is now used as a venue for weddings, meetings, conferences and other events.

== Image gallery ==
=== First Langelinie Pavilion ===
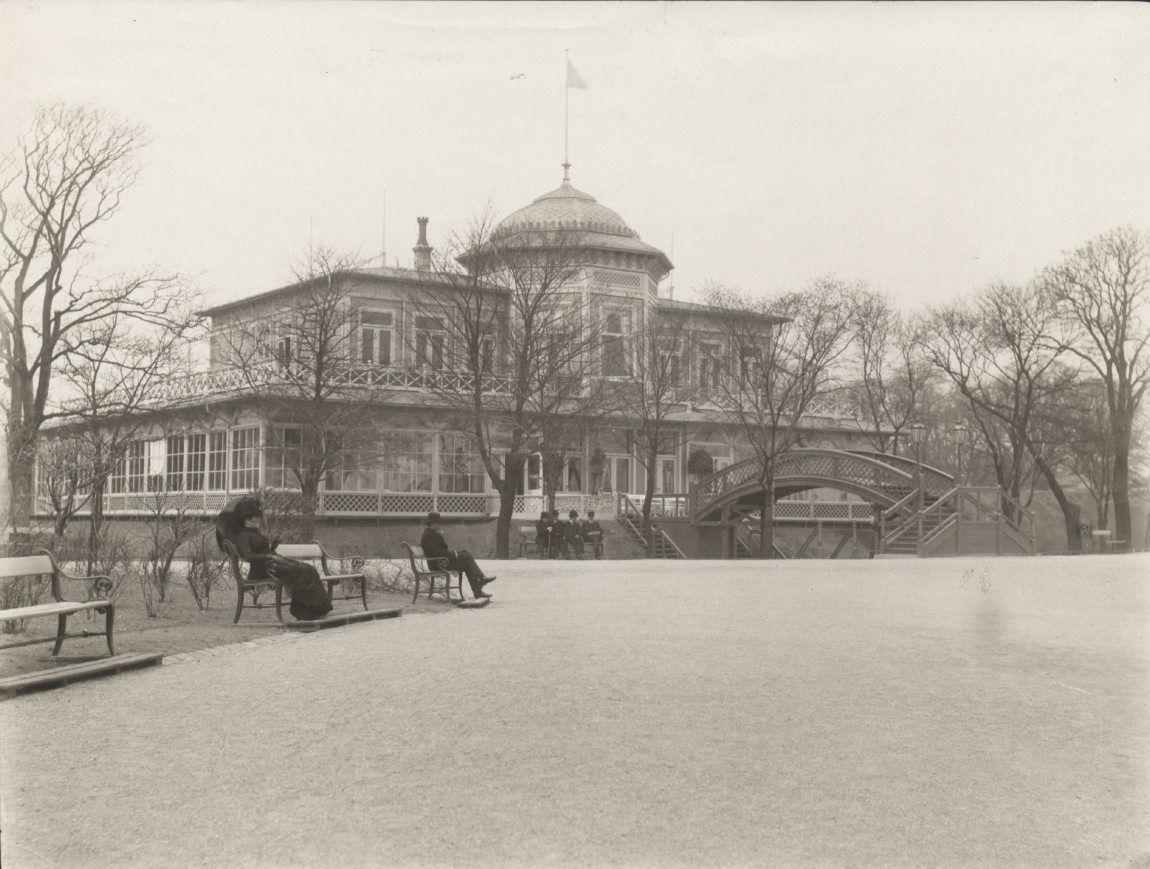
The first Langelinie Pavilion in c. 1885

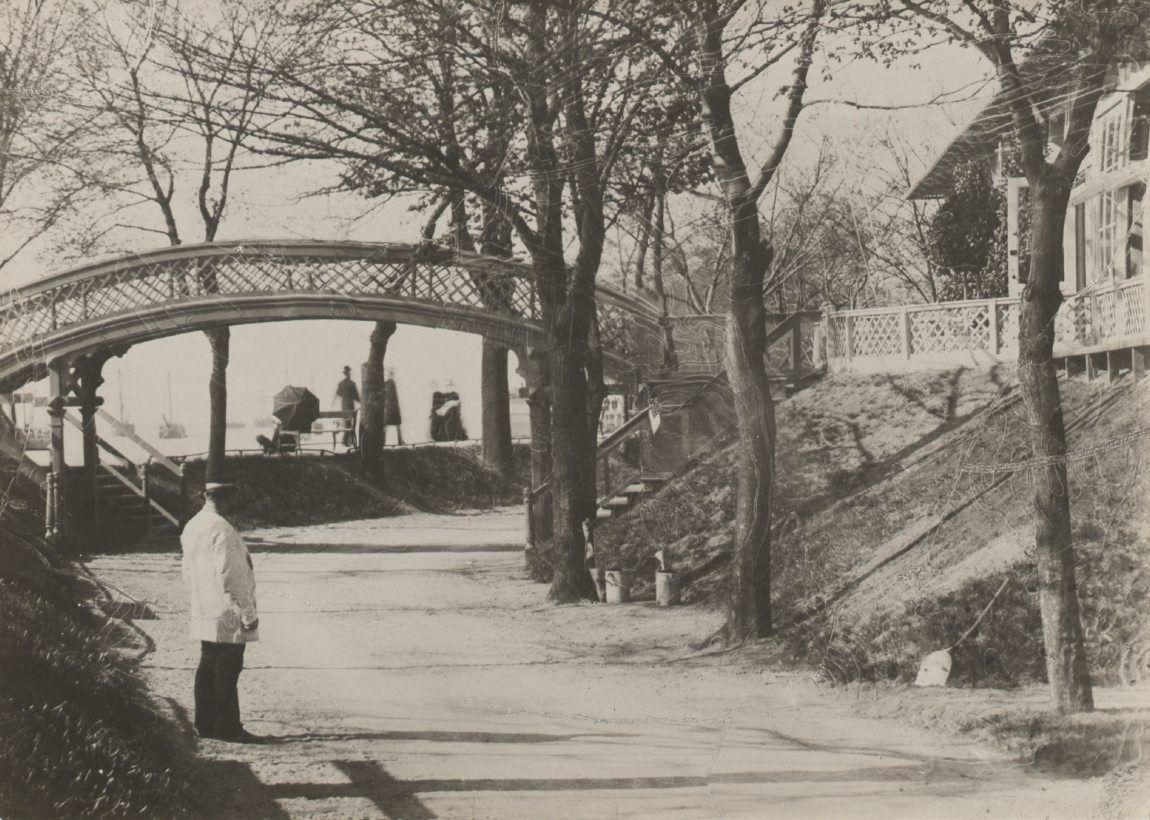
The building photographed by Frederik Riise

=== Second Langelinie Pavilion ===
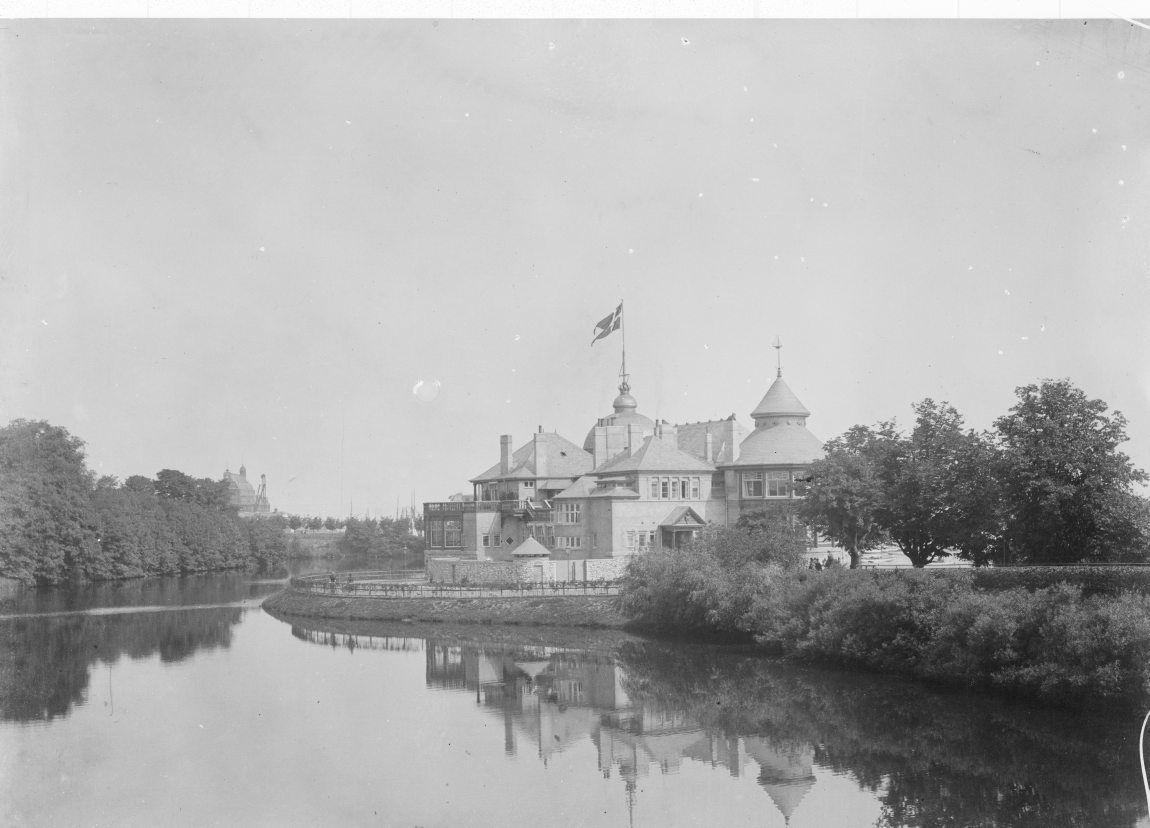
The second Langelinie Pavilion photographed by Fritz Theodor Benzen in April 1903

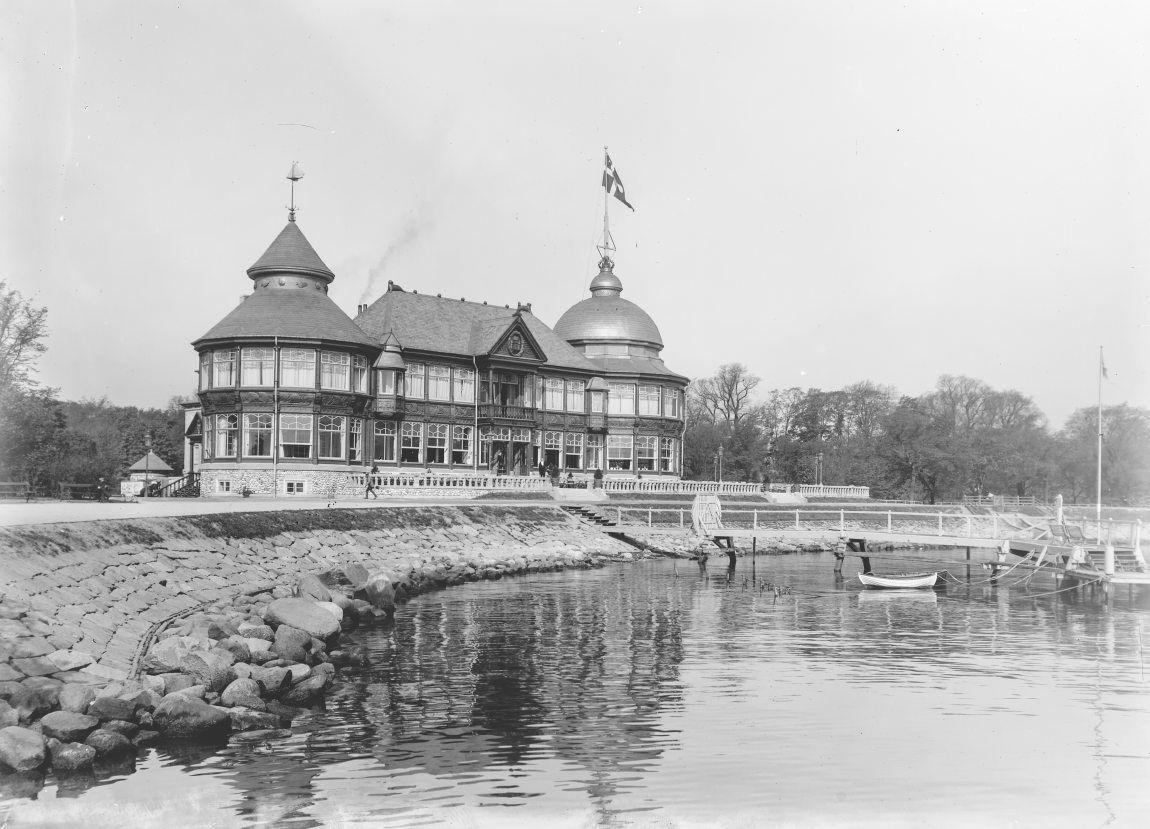
The building photographed by Frederik Riise

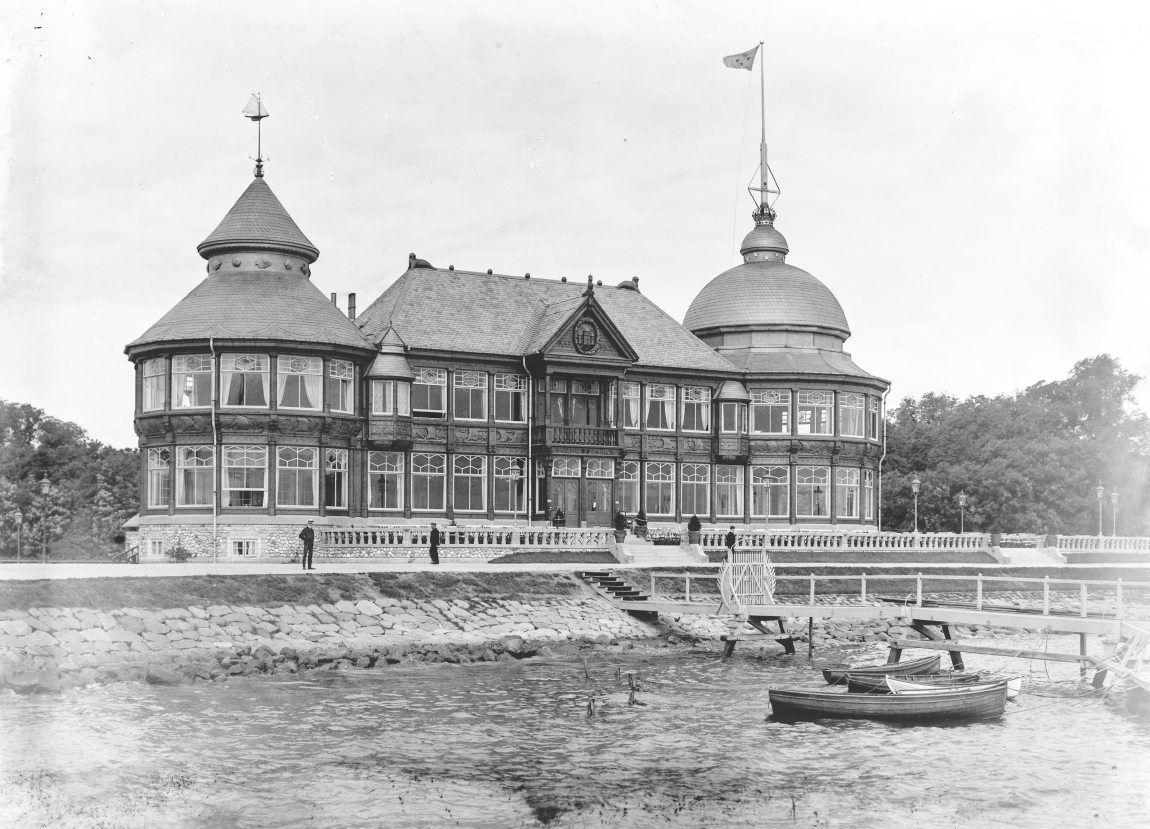
The building photographed by Frederik Riise

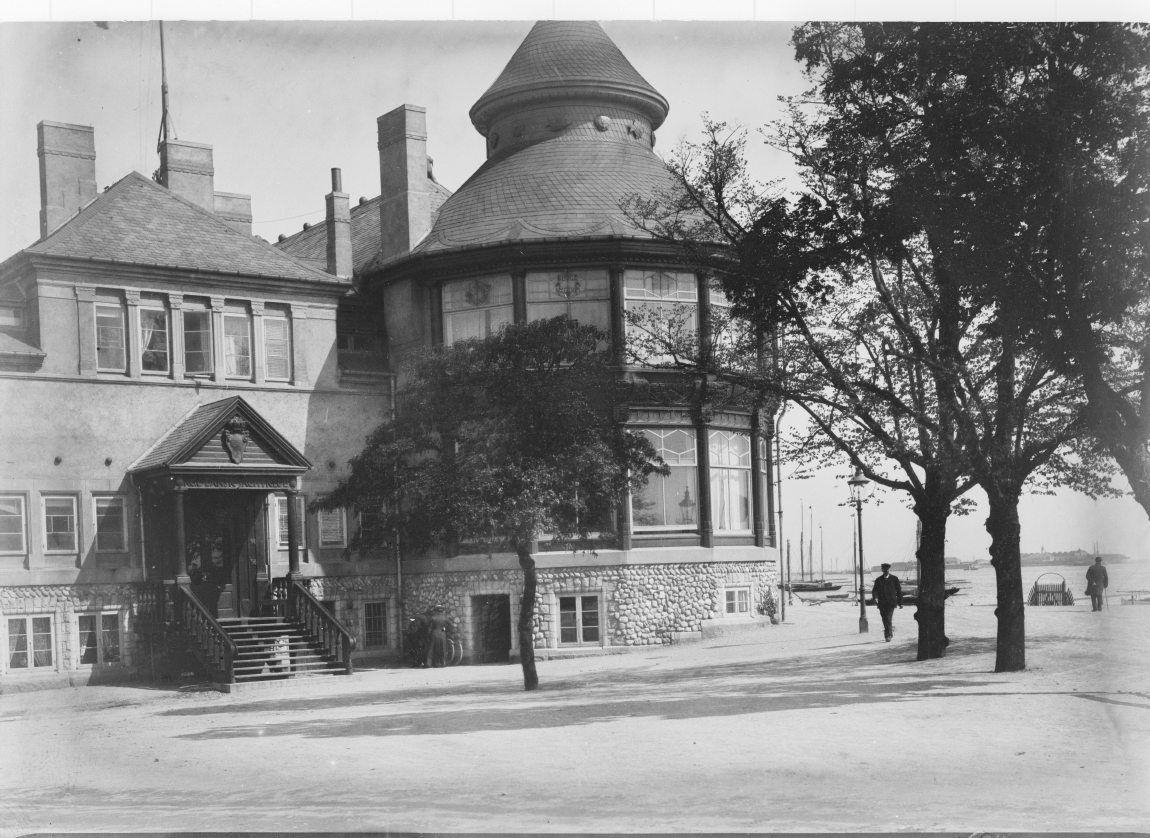
Close-up of the building

=== Current Langelinie Pavilion ===
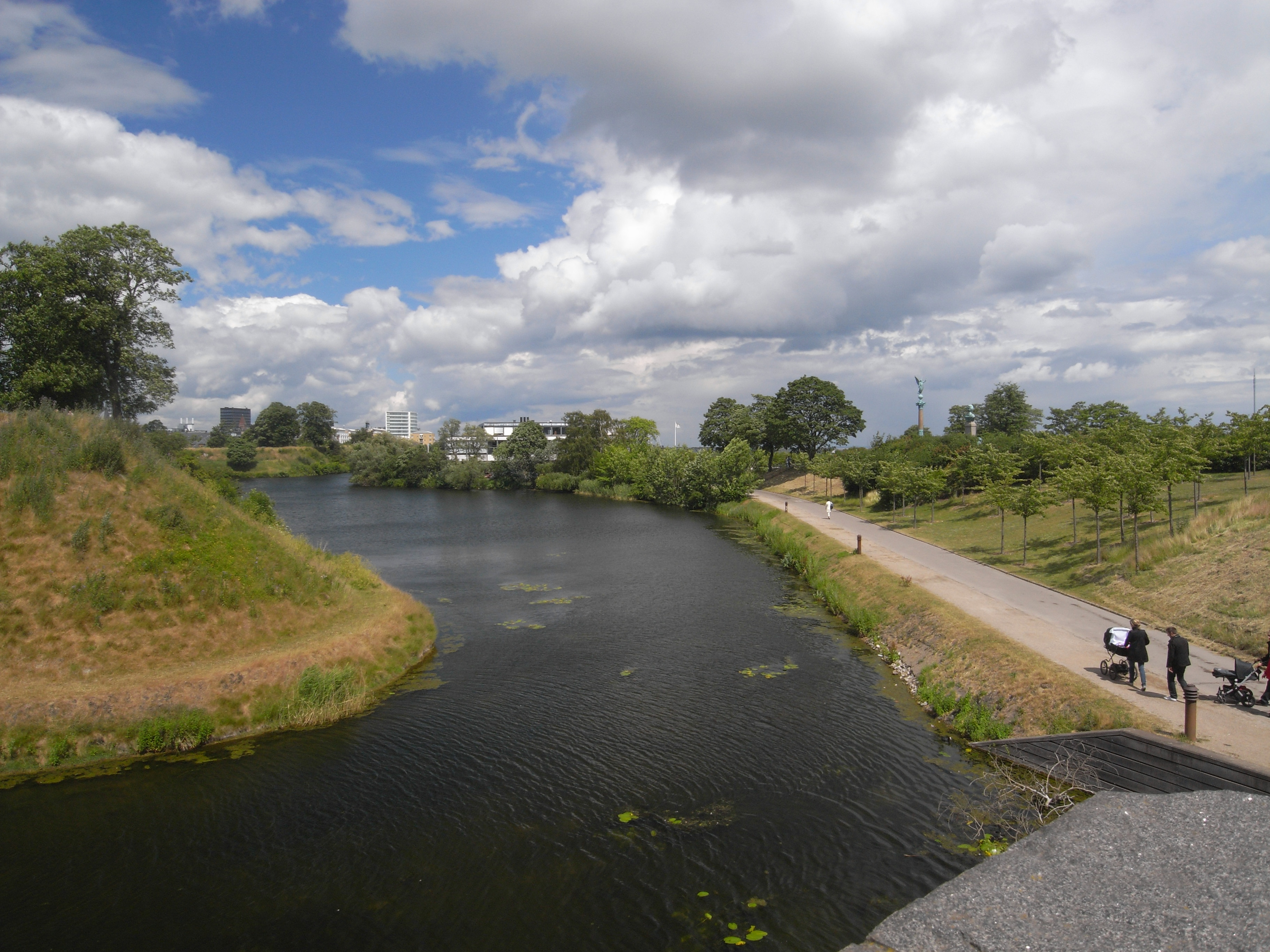
The building seen from the south

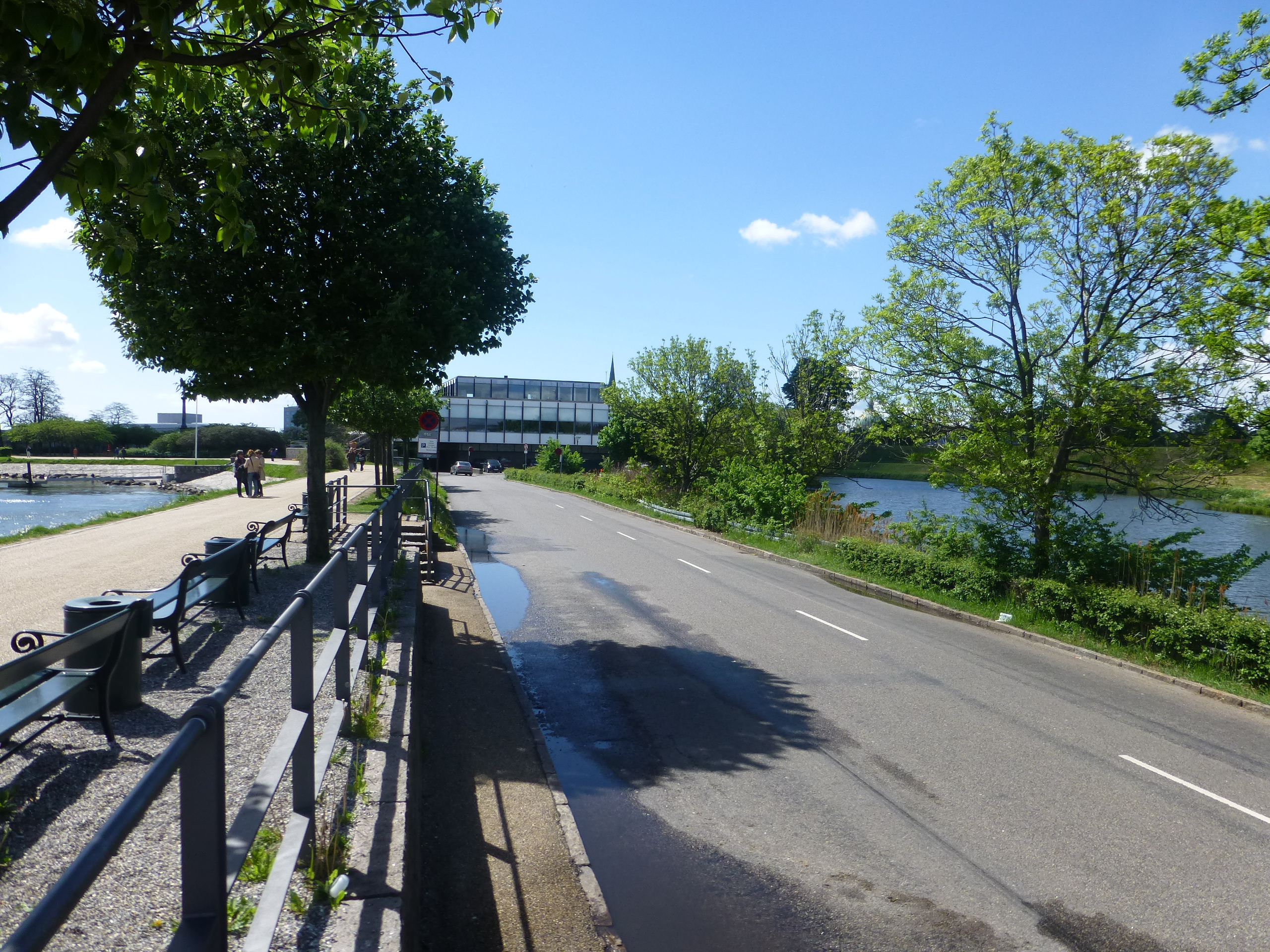
The building seen from the north

== See also ==
- Søpavillonen
