= Ivar Huitfeldt Column =

Coordinates: 55.69062°N 12.59915°E

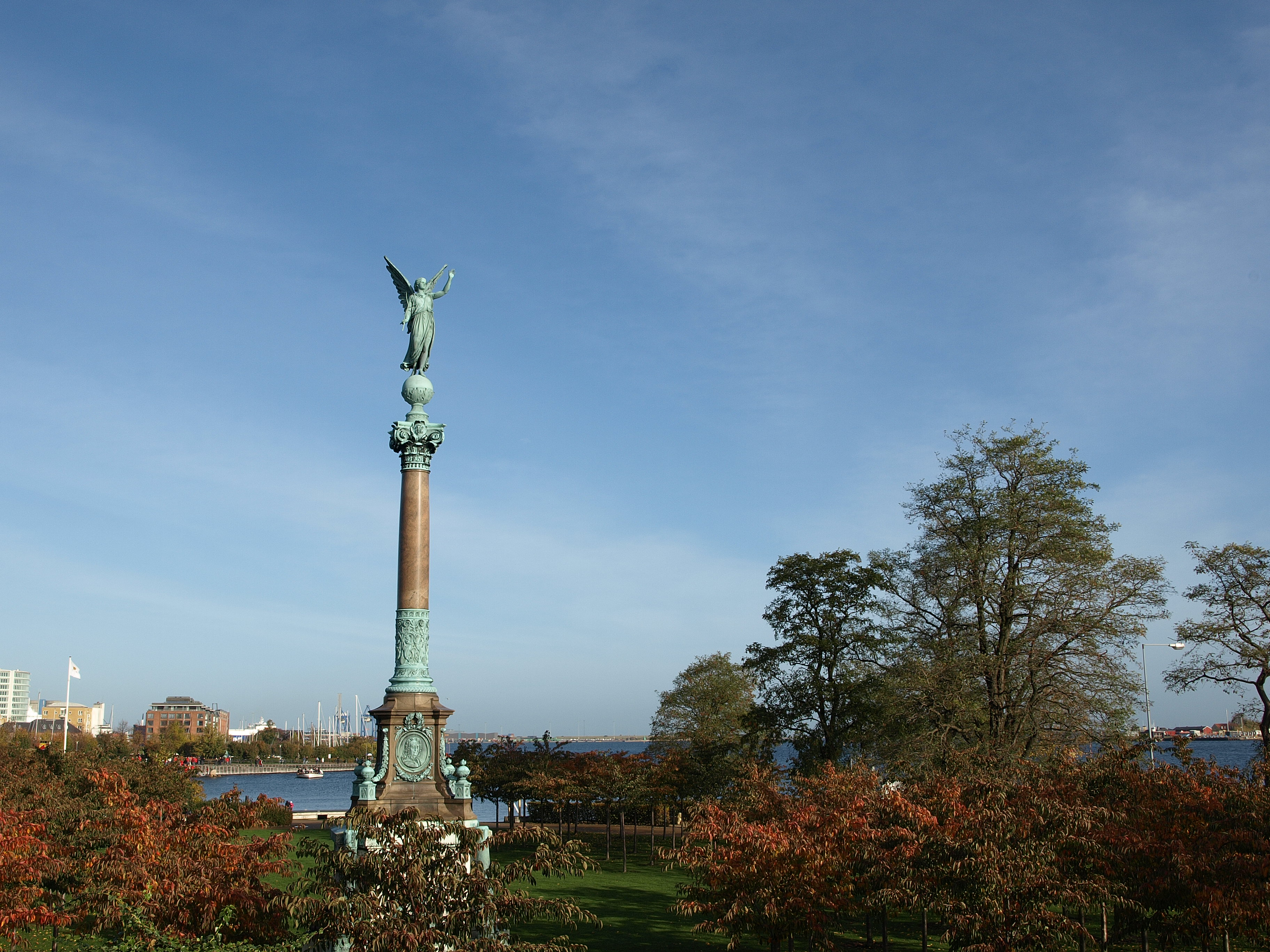
Ivar Huitfeldt Column

The Ivar Huitfeldt Column is a monument at Langelinie in Copenhagen, Denmark, built to commemorate the death of Admiral Ivar Huitfeldt and his men from HDMS Dannebroge, which exploded and sank in the Battle of Køge Bat during the Great Northern War. The monument was constructed in 1886 to a design by Vilhelm Dahlerup. Ferdinand Edvard Ring was responsible for the statue of the Roman goddess of victory, Victoria, and for the reliefs, while Carl Brummer undertook the monument's architectural design.

== Background ==
On 4 October 1710, the ship of the line HDMS Dannebroge, which Huitfeldt commanded, was set on fire during an encounter with the Swedes. He gave orders to continue the battle, which only came to an end when the ship blew up. Huitfeldt and 497 crew members were killed.

Between 1872 and 1875 various artifacts were brought up from the wreck, including cannons and the ship's anchor.

== Design ==
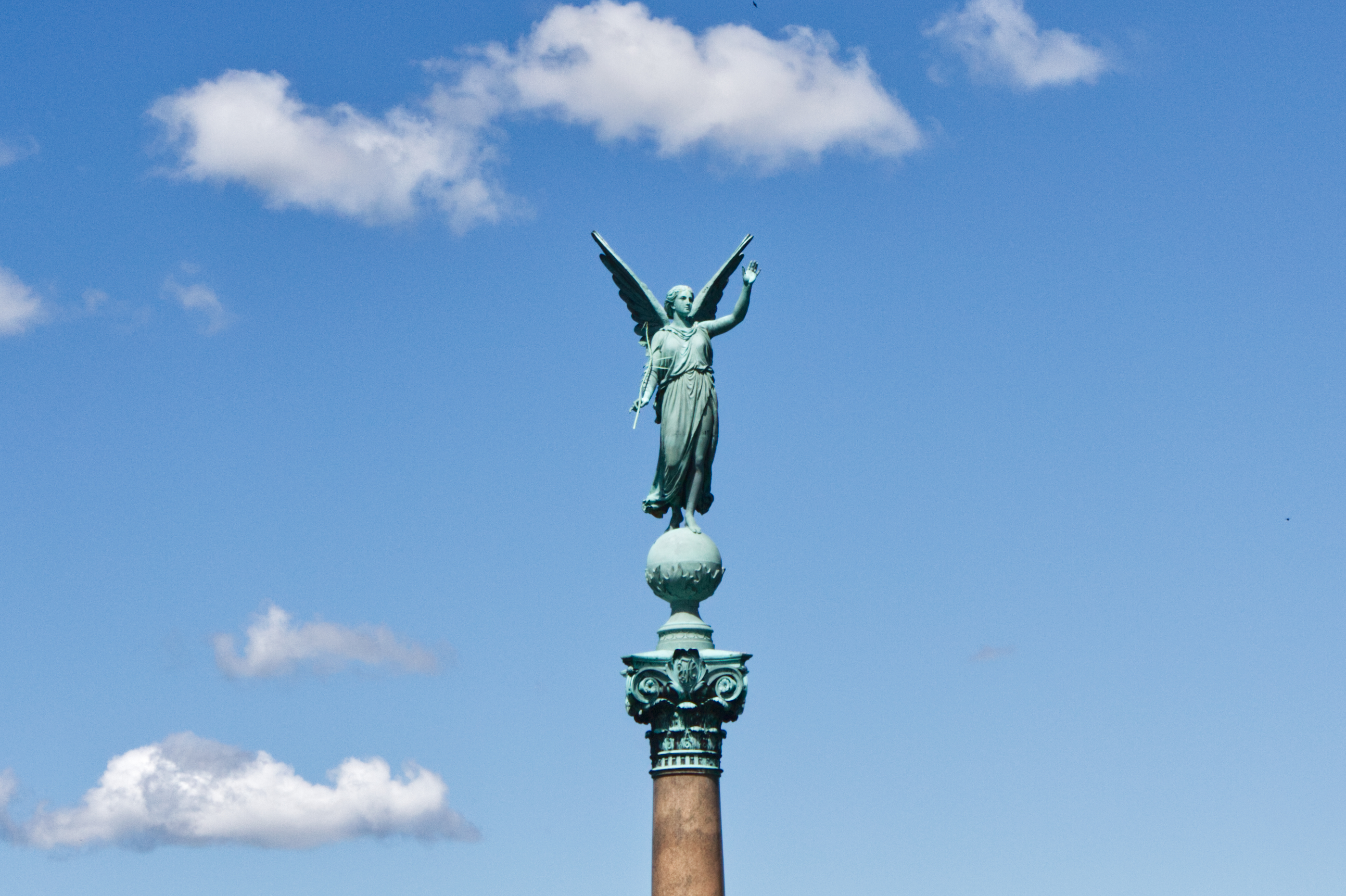
The top

The monument consists of a marble column placed on a tall granite base and topped by a statue of Victoria. It stands approximately 19 metres tall and measures 3.377 x 3.77 metres at the base.

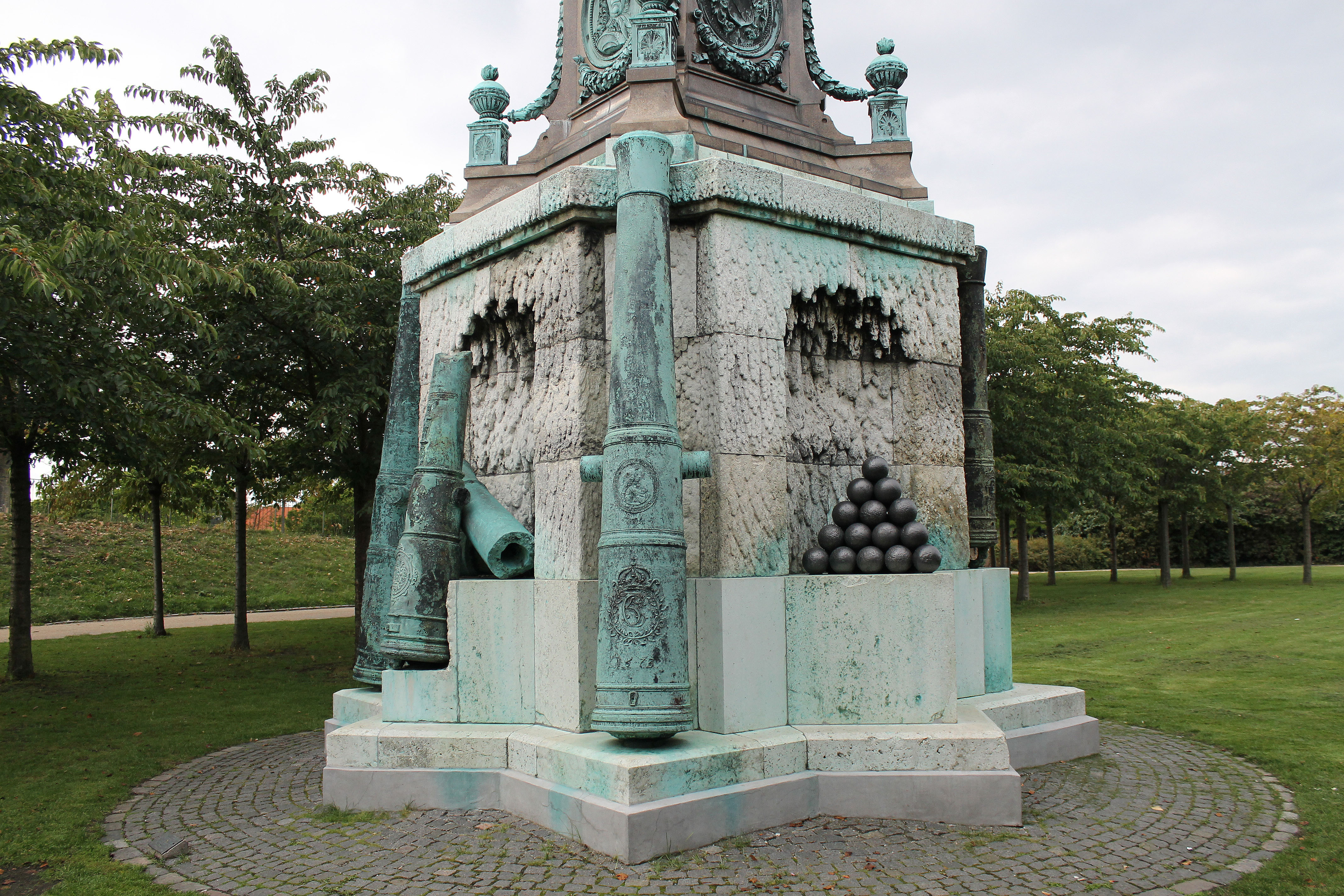
The base

Four bronze reliefs on the base of the monument, one on each side, feature Huitfeldt's portrait, his coat of arms, his ship and a short text. The design incorporates the cannonballs barrels and the ship's anchor is attached to the plinth.

== History ==
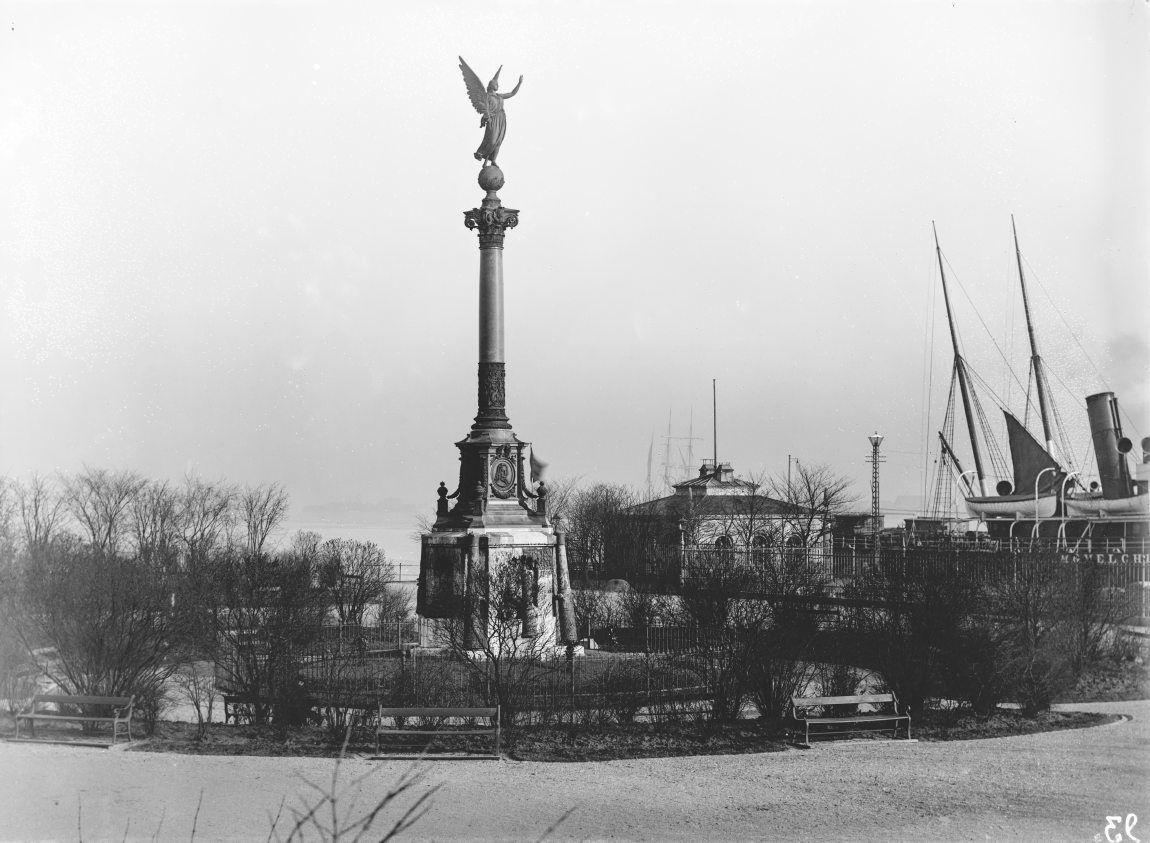
The Ivar Huitfeldt Column in c. 1890

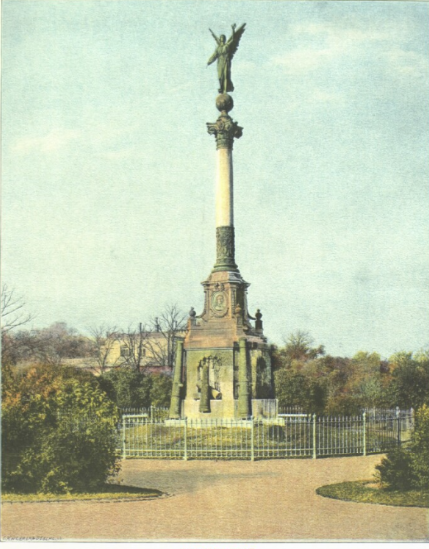
Drawing from 1896

The initial plans for a Huitfeldt memorial called for a much smaller monument, a sort of cairn, but after the intervention of Carlsberg brewer Carl Jacobsen who had already sponsored several monuments in Copenhagen, including a statue of Admiral Niels Juel next to the National Bank, it was decided to launch a design competition. It was won by Vilhelm Dahlerup. The original plan was to erect the monument at the small churchyard attached to the naval Church of Holmen, close to the main entrance in Havnegade, but Dahlerup's monument was ultimately deemed too big for the site. The bronze components were cast in C.F. Holm's bronze foundry at Gammel Mønt.

== See also ==
- Ivar Huitfeldt class frigate
