= Royal Danish Yacht Club =

Danish yacht club

Kongelig Dansk Yachtklub
- Burgee

- Ensign
- Full name: Royal Danish Yacht Club
- Short name: KDY
- Founded: 3 July 1866
- Location: Tuborg Havnepark 15, Hellerup, Copenhagen
- Commodore: Anne Sofie Munk Hansen
- Website: Official website

Royal Danish Yacht Club (Danish: Kongelig Dansk Yachtklub; shortened KDY) is a Danish yacht club in Copenhagen that was established 1866 under the name Dansk Forening for Lystsejlads. It is the oldest yacht club in Denmark, and has been under royal patronage since Christian IX's approval in 1891. It has about 2,200 members. The club house has been situated in Tuborg Havn since 2007.

== History ==
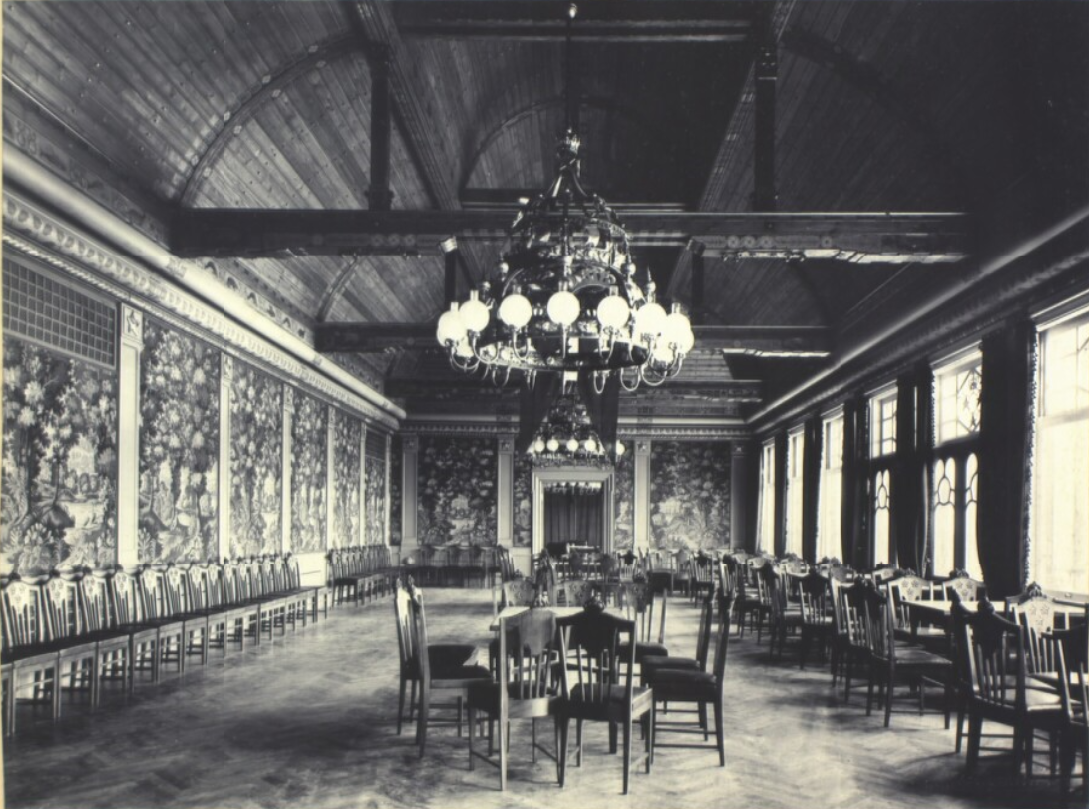
The Zinn family's music room

The Royal Danish Yacht Club was originally based in the Langelinie Pavilion in Copenhagen. The building was destroyed by schalburgtage during World War II. The club has later moved to their new purpose-built headquarters in Tuborg Havn.
