= Langelinie =

Park, promenade and pier in Copenhagen

Coordinates: 55°41′32.6″N 12°35′55.47″E

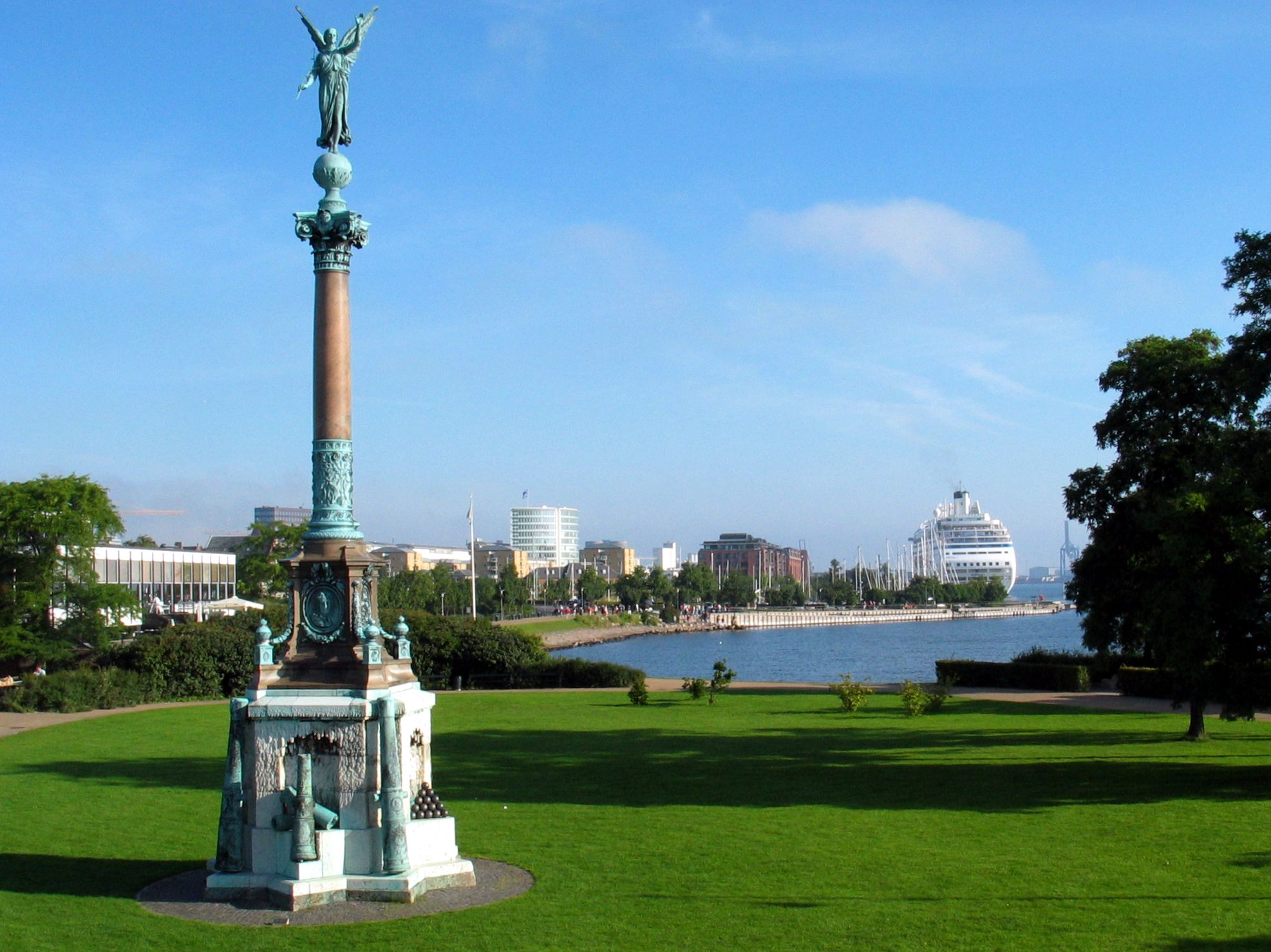
The Langelinie Promenade

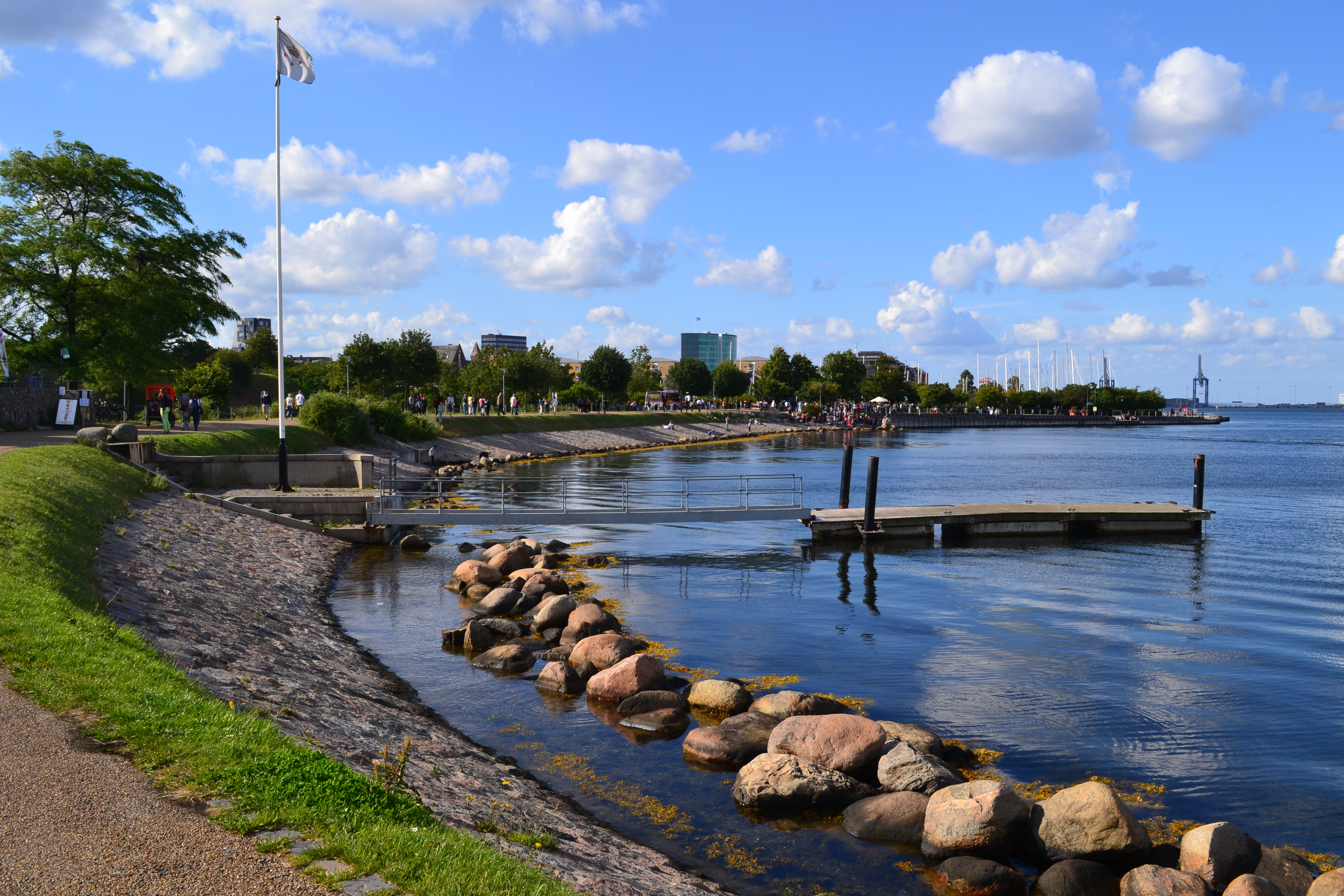
View over the Langelinie Promenade

Langelinie (English: Long Line) is a pier, promenade and park in central Copenhagen, Denmark, and home of The Little Mermaid statue. The area has for centuries been a popular destination for excursions and strolls in Copenhagen. Most cruise ships arriving in Copenhagen also berth at Langelinie Pier.

== History ==
=== Military area and the first promenade ===
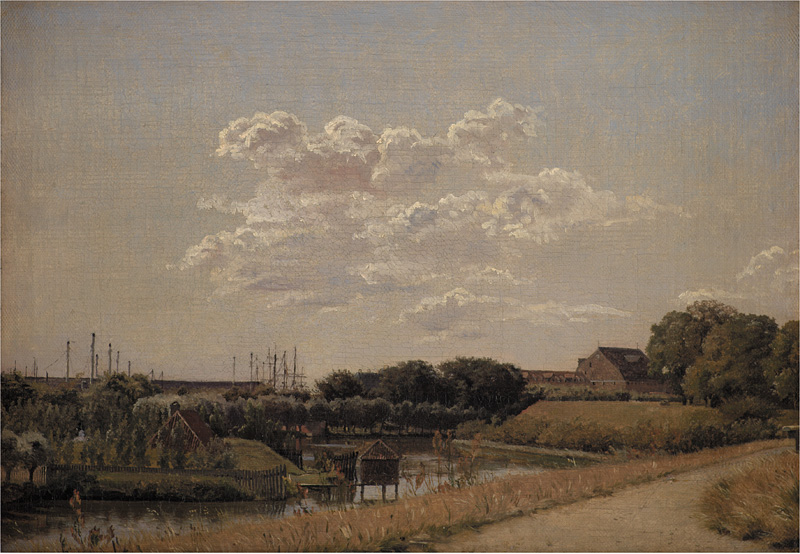
Christen Købke: A view from Kastellet's rampart towards Langelinie and the Naval Basec. c. 1832

The name Langelinie goes back to the middle of the 17th century where it referred to an idyllic path along the Øresund coast that rounded the citadel Kastellet and continued towards a lime kiln north of the city. For a long time, the stretch was a military area where civilians were not granted unrestricted access. Under a general order from 1819, soldiers were required to "throw water in the head and on the breast and to cool their feet in the water".

Eventually a beach promenade and a park for the Bourgeoisie were made but with access only on the payment of a toll to keep the more common people out. Not until a public uprising in 1848 did the area become open to everybody.

=== Port area and the second promenade ===
The expansion of the city and the increasing industrialization soon made it clear that the city's harbour was becoming too small and in the same time old plans to create a free port were revived. In a plan from 1862 it was decided to dig out the area to allow access for the largest ocean-going vessels and use the materials removed for land fills along the coast. A suggestion to make all of Amager into a duty-free zone was abolished and instead it was decided to create a free port in the area north of Kastellet at the site of the Langelinie promenade. The beginning of the work was prompted by Germany's construction of the Kiel Canal that was begun in 1887 and threatened Copenhagen's position. In 1894 the work was completed and Copenhagen had got an entirely new harbourfront. The old beach promenade with Bourgeois mansions had turned into the heavily trafficated street Strandboullevarden located several hundred metres inland and the beach where the soldiers had been required to cool their feet had turned into harbour basins. Langelinie became now a pier on the other side of that harbour basin.

== Langelinie Park ==
The Langelinie Park (Danish: Langelinieparken) stretches from Esplanaden in the south to Langelinie Marina and the base of the Langelinie Pier in the north. Formally, it includes Kastellet although this site is generally referred to under its own name. The park contains numerous monuments, buildings, a marina, statues and a playground. Among these are the Gefion Fountain, the Ivar Huitfeldt Column and The Little Mermaid.

== Langelinie Marina ==
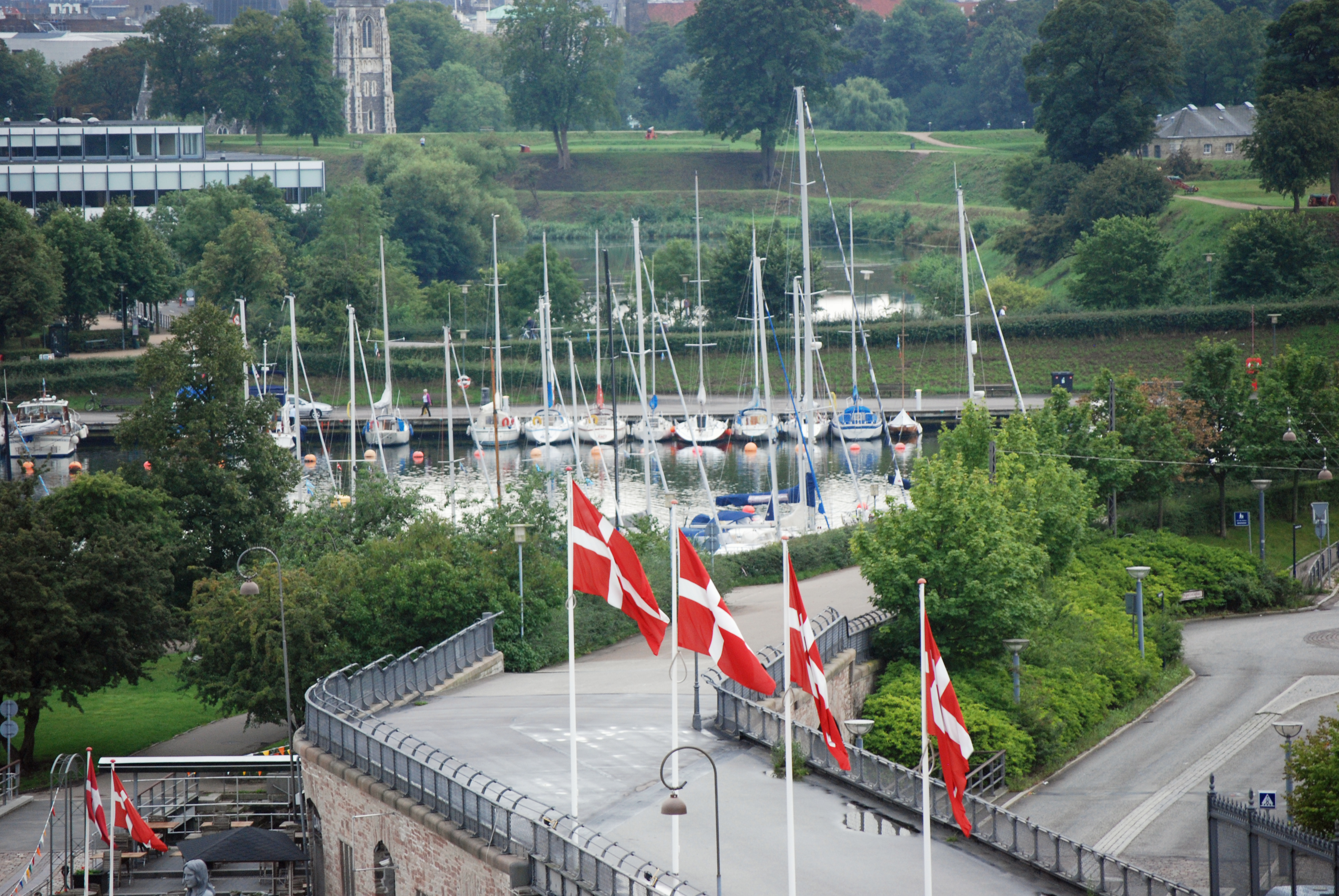
Langelinie Marina

Langelinie Marina was established in the 1890s in connection with the foundation of the Free Port and the Langelinie Quat. Its purpose was to provide the workers from the construction site as well as those from the Burmeister & Wain shipyard on the other side of the harbour with a chance to have a small boat, enabling them to supplement their incomes with a bit of fishing.

Copenhagen rowing clubs have for many years had their base at the marina. Today only B&Ws and DFDS' are left after ØK's passed their premises to Langelinie Marina's Boat Huild.

== Langelinie Pier ==
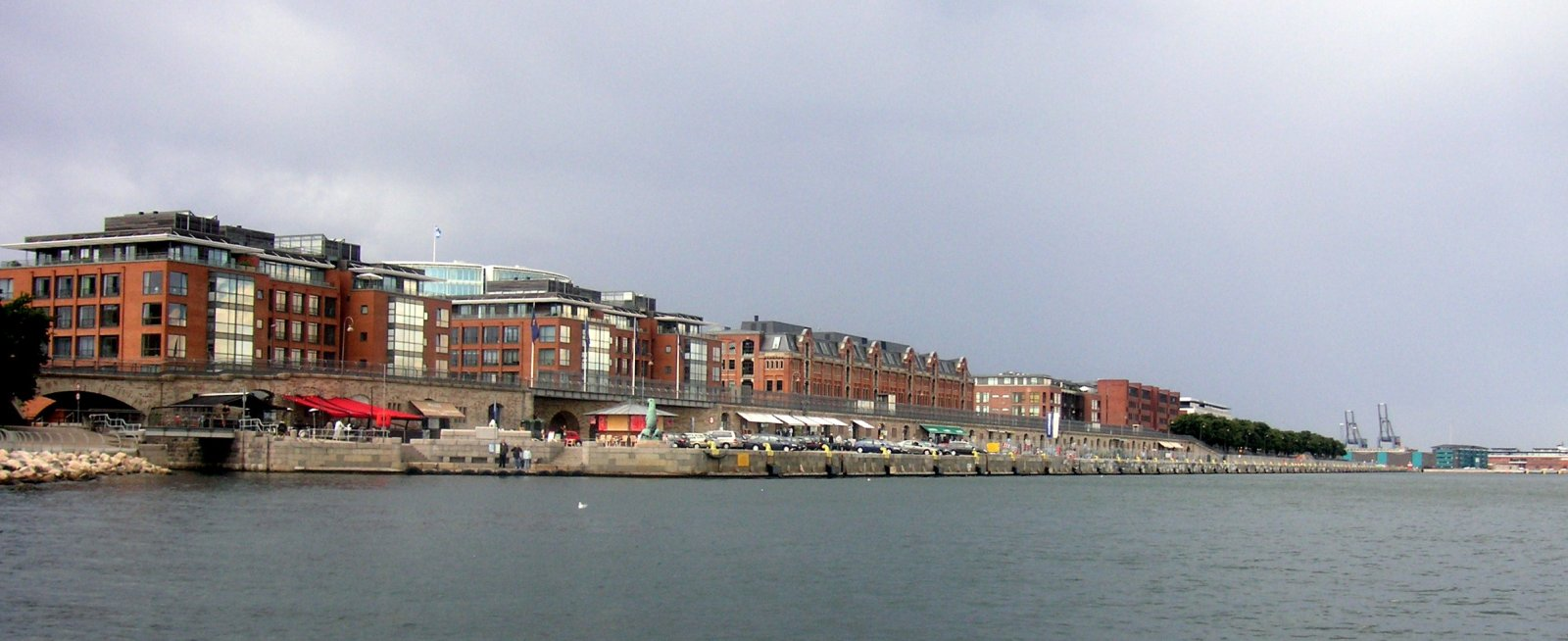
Langelinie seen from the water

The Langelinie Pier (Danish: Langeliniekajen) has a water depth allowing big ocean-going vessels to tie up. The area has a number of statues and memorials. These include a cast bronze sculpture polar bear with cubs and memorials for MS Jutlandia, Ludvig Mylius-Erichsen. The polar bear has some bullet holes at the head, which were made by a German soldier under the Occupation of Denmark.

== Langelinie Pavilion ==
The Langelinie Pavilion was designed by Nils and Rva Koppel. It is the third building of the name at the site.
