= Iver Huitfeldt =

Dano-Norwegian military officer (1665–1710)

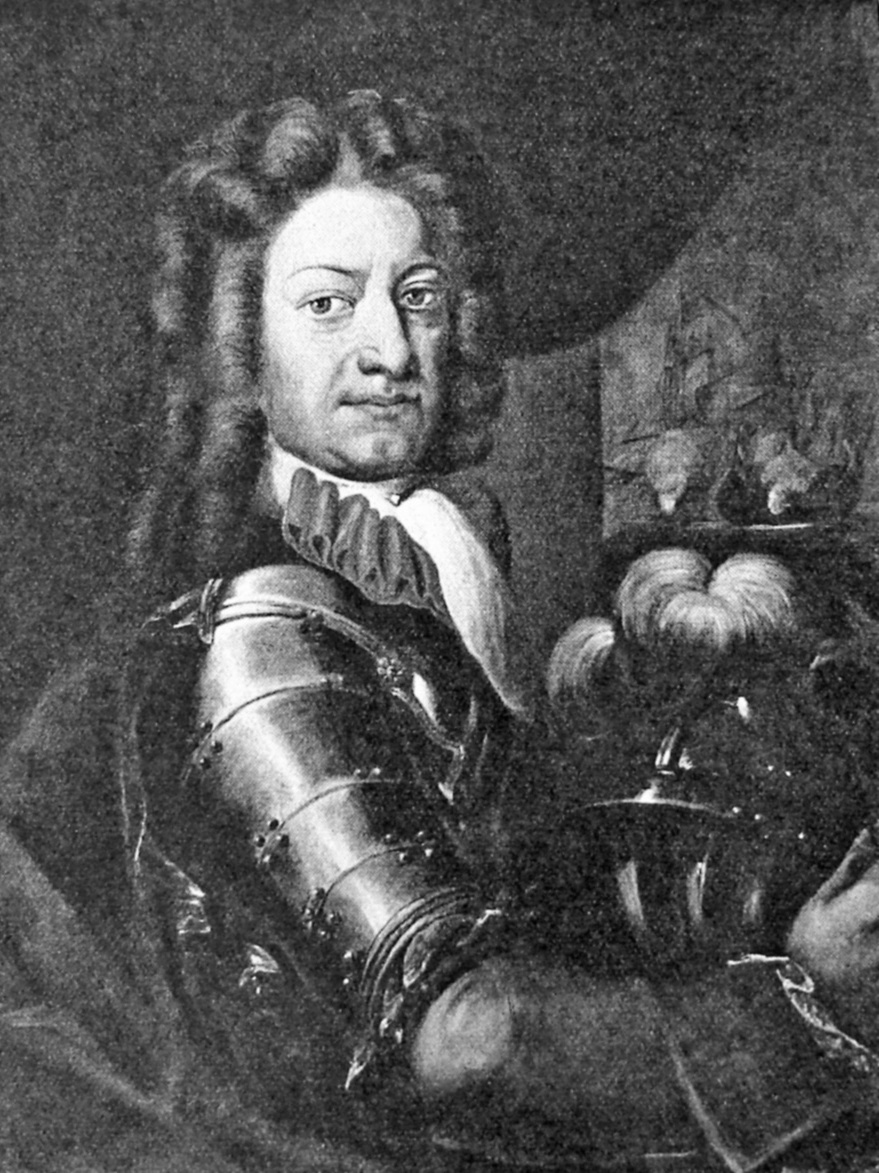
Portrait of Huitfeldt

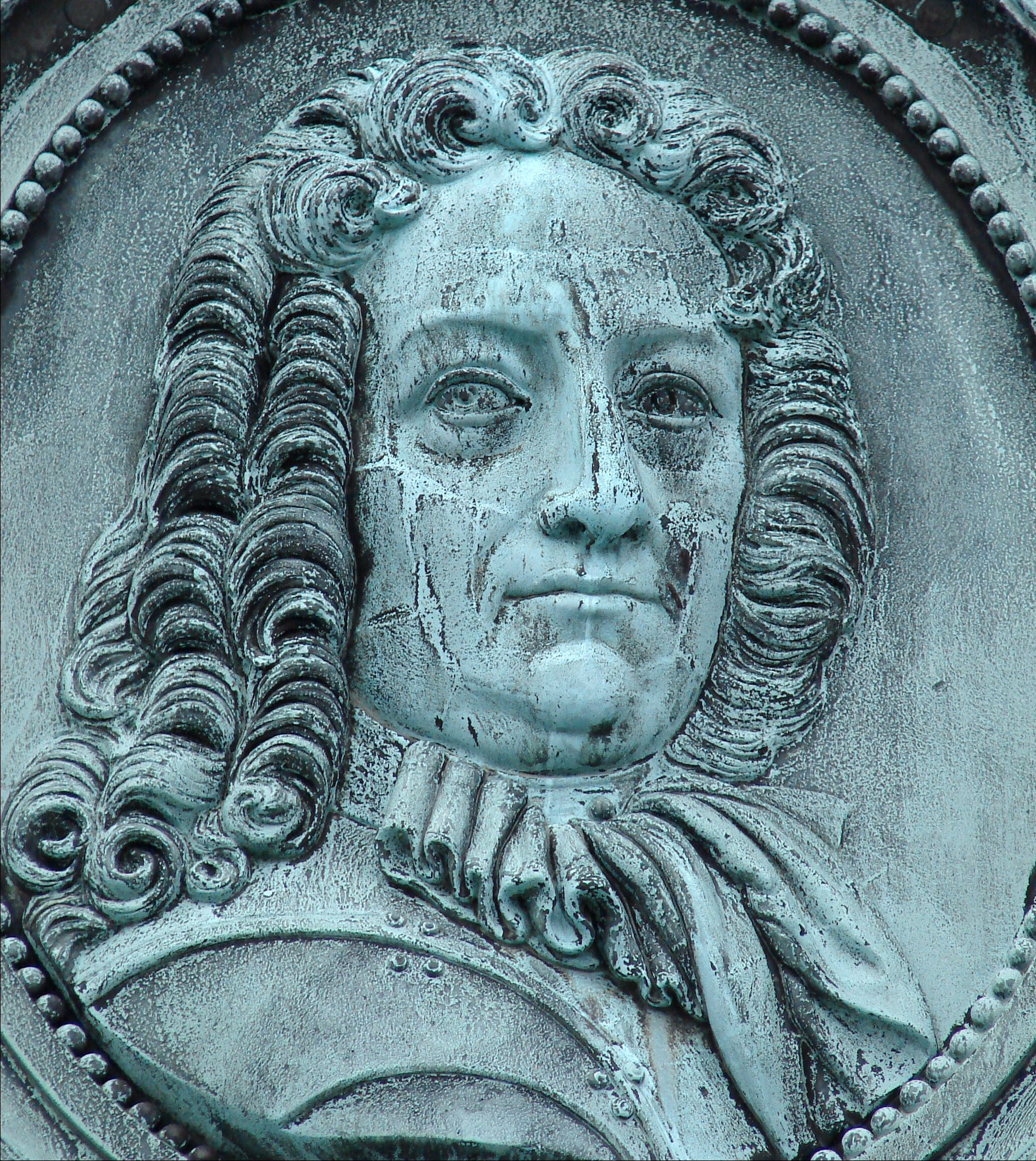
Medallion of Huitfeldt

Iver Huitfeldt (5 December 1665 – 4 October 1710) was a Royal Danish-Norwegian Navy officer who was killed in action, when he commanded the ship Dannebroge during the Great Northern War.

== Biography ==
Iver Huitfeldt was born in the Norwegian town of Halden. He lost his mother at the age of six and his father died six years later. Both his parents died in his childhood years and he was therefore later raised by his stepmother with whom he moved to the Norwegian area of Hurum. At age 16, he sent an application to Christian V of Denmark-Norway to join the navy. It was granted and he started the trainee programme of the Danish-Norwegian navy. As a part of the trainee period he first served in the Dutch fleet before later joining the French fleet.

He returned to do service in the Danish-Norwegian fleet in 1689 as a 24-year-old lieutenant, but in the following year he returned to do service in the Dutch navy to get more experience. He participated in the Battle of Beachy Head, where the Dutch-English navy was defeated by the French fleet under the command of admiral Tourville. An admiral he served under just two years later at the Battle of La Hogue, where the French navy was defeated by a Dutch-English fleet.

In 1691, he got the title as captain in the Danish-Norwegian fleet and in 1704 he was appointed commander. This year the king also ordered Iver Huitfeldt to take charge of the shipyard in Kristiansand, a position he held until 1707.

=== Death ===
Iver Huitfeldt was killed in action during the Great Northern War at a battle in Køge Bugt on 4 October 1710. The Danish-Norwegian fleet was engaged by the Swedish fleet, and Huitfeldt's ship Dannebroge exploded after a fire on deck reached the gunpowder depot. After the ship caught fire, Huitfeldt ordered his crew to remain onboard and continue firing at the Swedish fleet. Due to Dannebroge's strategic position, this decision allowed the rest of the Danish-Norwegian fleet to escape, but led to the deaths of almost the entire crew. The corpse of Iver Huitfeldt was later found on the beach in Køge Bugt.

According to the commander in chief of the Danish-Norwegian navy, Ulrik Christian Gyldenløve, the fire on Dannebroge was probably ignited by the ship's own cannons. Gyldenløve mentions this in his letter to the king, where Gyldenløve also regrets that a "brave and talented" officer should die in such a miserable way. Gyldenløve followed the battle from his ship Elephanten and wrote the letter at about 9 o'clock in the morning of October 5.
